= 2013 World Baseball Classic rosters =

2013 World Baseball Classic

The following is a list of squads for each nation competing at the 2013 World Baseball Classic (WBC). The deadline for submitting provisional rosters was January 16, but teams had until February 20 to finalize their roster decisions. Provisional rosters were announced on January 17, and final rosters were announced on February 20.

In the WBC, starting pitchers are allowed to throw 65 pitches in first-round games. This limit increases to 80 in the second round and 95 in the semifinal and final rounds. If a starting pitcher throws over 50 pitches in a game, he must not pitch again for a minimum of four days. Relief pitchers are allowed to pitch on consecutive days only if they threw less than 30 pitches on the previous day. Pitchers are not allowed to pitch on three consecutive days under any circumstances.

Injured players could be freely replaced before the team's first game. Once a team begins play, injured catchers can be replaced at any time, but other injured players cannot be replaced until the team advances to the next round of the tournament.

The United States provisional roster is made up entirely of players from Major League Baseball (MLB), and the Dominican Republic provisional roster has only one player not signed to a team for the 2013 season. The Canadian team has 12 players who appeared in MLB in 2012, while Japan has none (three prominent Japanese MLB players, Yu Darvish, Ichiro Suzuki and two-time defending WBC MVP Daisuke Matsuzaka, chose not to play). Though five members who competed for the Cuban national team in the 2009 WBC have since defected, the Cuban team is considered strong. Three members of MLB.com's Top 100 prospect list are participating in the 2013 WBC: Xander Bogaerts, Eddie Rosario, and Jameson Taillon.

== Pool A ==
=== Brazil ===
Manager
Barry Larkin
Coaches
Tiago Caldeira, Marcos Guimarães, Go Kuroki, Ricardo Matumaru, Mitsuyoshi Sato, Satiro Watanabe

| Player | No. | Pos. | DOB and age | Team | League | Birthplace |
|---|---|---|---|---|---|---|
| Gabriel Asakura | 21 | P | November 11, 1988 (aged 24) | | | São Paulo, Brazil |
| Rafael Fernandes | 27 | P | April 23, 1986 (aged 26) | (Japan) Yakult Swallows | Nippon Professional Baseball | São Paulo, Brazil |
| Murilo Gouvea | 34 | P | September 15, 1988 (aged 24) | (United States) Houston Astros (minors) | Minor League Baseball | São Paulo, Brazil |
| Hugo Kanabushi | 24 | P | May 22, 1989 (aged 23) | (Japan) Yakult Swallows | Nippon Professional Baseball | Paraná, Brazil |
| Kesley Kondo | 19 | P | December 1, 1989 (aged 23) | | | São Paulo, Brazil |
| Daniel Missaki | 13 | P | April 9, 1996 (aged 16) | | | Fujinomiya, Shizuoka, Japan |
| Rafael Moreno | 18 | P | February 11, 1995 (aged 18) | (United States) Baltimore Orioles (minors) | Minor League Baseball | São Paulo, Brazil |
| Oscar Nakaoshi | 14 | P | March 28, 1991 (aged 21) | (Japan) Honda | Japanese Industrial League | São Paulo, Brazil |
| Ernesto Noris | 28 | P | November 24, 1972 (aged 40) | | | Havana, Cuba |
| Andre Rienzo | 25 | P | July 5, 1988 (aged 24) | (United States) Chicago White Sox (minors) | Minor League Baseball | São Paulo, Brazil |
| Thyago Vieira | 32 | P | January 7, 1993 (aged 20) | (United States) Seattle Mariners (minors) | Minor League Baseball | São Paulo, Brazil |
| Carlos Yoshimura | 15 | P | February 22, 1984 (aged 29) | (Japan) Yamaha | Japanese Industrial League | Vagrem Grande Paulista, São Paulo State, Brazil |
| Diego Franca | 12 | C | April 6, 1987 (aged 25) | (Japan) Kazusa Magic | Japanese Industrial League | Maringá, Paraná, Brazil |
| Bruno Hirata | 26 | C | March 13, 1988 (aged 24) | (Japan) Toshiba | Japanese Industrial League | Pilar do Sul, Brazil |
| Felipe Burin | 4 | IF | February 10, 1992 (aged 21) | (United States) Los Angeles Dodgers (minors) | Minor League Baseball | Marilia, São Paulo State, Brazil |
| Alan Fanhoni | 33 | IF | December 23, 1991 (aged 21) | (Japan) NTT East | Japanese Industrial League | São Paulo, Brazil |
| Iago Januario | 37 | IF | January 20, 1993 (aged 20) | (United States) Tampa Bay Rays (minors) | Minor League Baseball | Marilia, Paraná, Brazil |
| Daniel Matsumoto | 31 | IF | December 18, 1980 (aged 32) | (Japan) Yakult Swallows | Nippon Professional Baseball | São Paulo, Brazil |
| Pedro Okuda | 17 | IF | April 20, 1990 (aged 22) | (United States) Seattle Mariners (minors) | Minor League Baseball | Marilia, Paraná, Brazil |
| Leonardo Reginatto | 20 | IF | April 10, 1990 (aged 22) | (United States) Tampa Bay Rays (minors) | Minor League Baseball | Curitiba, Brazil |
| Lucas Rojo | 1 | IF | April 5, 1994 (aged 18) | (United States) Philadelphia Phillies (minors) | Minor League Baseball | São Roque, Brazil |
| Marcio Tanaka | 6 | IF | June 9, 1980 (aged 32) | (Japan) JR Kyushu | Japanese Industrial League | São Paulo, Brazil |
| Tiago Magalhães | 30 | OF | March 18, 1981 (aged 31) | (Brazil) Guarulhos Baseball Club | Campeonato Brasileiro de Beisebol | São Paulo, Brazil |
| Mike Magario | 9 | OF | November 18, 1991 (aged 21) | (Japan) Yakult Swallows (farm) | Eastern League | São Paulo, Brazil |
| J. C. Muniz | 29 | OF | January 28, 1976 (aged 37) | (Brazil) Marília Baseball Club | Campeonato Brasileiro de Beisebol | Havana, Cuba |
| Paulo Orlando | 16 | OF | November 1, 1985 (aged 27) | (United States) Kansas City Royals (minors) | Minor League Baseball | São Paulo, Brazil |
| Jean Tome | 35 | OF | September 5, 1989 (aged 23) | (Brazil) Atibaia Baseball Club | Campeonato Brasileiro de Beisebol | Atibaia, São Paulo State, Brazil |
| Reinaldo Sato | 36 | DH | October 25, 1980 (aged 32) | (Japan) Yamaha | Japanese Industrial League | Mogi das Cruzes, São Paulo State, Brazil |

=== China ===
Manager
John McLaren
Coaches
Bob Buskett, Art Howe, Bruce Hurst, Yi Sheng, Yufeng Zhang

| Player | No. | Pos. | DOB and age | Team | League | Birthplace |
|---|---|---|---|---|---|---|
| Tao Bu | 15 | P | January 15, 1983 (aged 30) | (China) Henan Elephants | China Baseball League | Henan, People's Republic of China |
| Kun Chen | 33 | P | March 5, 1980 (aged 32) | (China) Sichuan Dragons | China Baseball League | Panzhihua, Sichuan, People's Republic of China |
| Shuai Li | 23 | P | July 11, 1985 (aged 27) | (China) Henan Elephants | China Baseball League | Henan, People's Republic of China |
| Wenming Li | 26 | P | October 13, 1988 (aged 24) | (China) Tianjin Lions | China Baseball League | Tianjin, People's Republic of China |
| Li Xin | 11 | P | April 10, 1992 (aged 20) | (China) Tianjin Lions | China Baseball League | Tianjin, People's Republic of China |
| Yu Liu | 8 | P | September 15, 1991 (aged 21) | (China) Beijing Tigers | China Baseball League | |
| Jiangang Lu | 17 | P | February 19, 1979 (aged 34) | (China) Tianjin Lions | China Baseball League | Tianjin, People's Republic of China |
| Xia Luo | 36 | P | July 14, 1992 (aged 20) | (China) Sichuan Dragons | China Baseball League | Sichuan, People's Republic of China |
| Quingyuan Meng | 19 | P | March 19, 1988 (aged 24) | (China) Beijing Tigers | China Baseball League | Beijing, People's Republic of China |
| Song Ran | 18 | P | October 23, 1992 (aged 20) | (China) Sichuan Dragons | China Baseball League | |
| Haifan Yang | 3 | P | October 23, 1994 (aged 18) | (China) Beijing Tigers | China Baseball League | |
| Yanyong Yang | 1 | P | May 5, 1994 (aged 18) | (China) Shanghai Eagles | China Baseball League | Beijing, People's Republic of China |
| Dawei Zhu | 62 | P | July 25, 1988 (aged 24) | (China) Shanghai Eagles | China Baseball League | Shanghai, People's Republic of China |
| Wei Dong | 22 | C | February 22, 1990 (aged 23) | (China) Beijing Tigers | China Baseball League | |
| Weiqiang Meng | 2 | C | May 31, 1989 (aged 23) | (China) Beijing Tigers | China Baseball League | Guangdong, People's Republic of China |
| Wei Wang | 56 | C | December 25, 1978 (aged 34) | (China) Beijing Tigers | China Baseball League | Beijing, People's Republic of China |
| Xu An | 25 | IF | September 7, 1987 (aged 25) | (China) Beijing Tigers | China Baseball League | Beijing, People's Republic of China |
| Ray Chang | 21 | IF | August 24, 1983 (aged 29) | (United States) Cincinnati Reds (minors) | Minor League Baseball | Kansas City, Missouri, United States |
| Fujia Chu | 30 | IF | September 10, 1989 (aged 23) | (China) Jiangsu Hopestars | China Baseball League | Jiangsu, People's Republic of China |
| Delong Jia | 31 | IF | July 4, 1985 (aged 27) | (China) Guangdong Leopards | China Baseball League | Dailan, People's Republic of China |
| Yubing Jia | 13 | IF | February 18, 1983 (aged 30) | (China) Beijing Tigers | China Baseball League | Beijing, People's Republic of China |
| Lei Li | 6 | IF | June 24, 1984 (aged 28) | (China) Beijing Tigers | China Baseball League | Beijing People's Republic of China |
| Shu Okamura | 20 | IF | October 13, 1993 (aged 19) | (China) Jiangsu Hopestars | China Baseball League | Tokyo, Japan |
| Yufeng Zhang | 9 | IF | February 9, 1977 (aged 36) | | | Shanghai, People's Republic of China |
| Xiao Cui | 27 | OF | July 31, 1988 (aged 24) | (China) Beijing Tigers | China Baseball League | Beijing, People's Republic of China |
| Jingfend Lai | 16 | OF | October 7, 1989 (aged 23) | (China) Guangdong Leopards | China Baseball League | |
| Zhenhong Lu | 28 | OF | April 15, 1991 (aged 21) | (China) Jiangsu Hopestars | China Baseball League | Jiangsu, People's Republic of China |

=== Cuba ===
Manager
32 Víctor Mesa
Coaches
27 Ángel Castillo (first base), 41 Juan de Dios Peña (pitching), 30 Primitivo Diaz (third base), 36 Víctor Figueroa (hitting), 35 Jorge Fuentes, 16 José Ramón Riscart, 6 Pedro Rodriguez

| Player | No. | Pos. | DOB and age | Team | League | Birthplace |
|---|---|---|---|---|---|---|
| Freddy Álvarez | 15 | P | April 29, 1989 (aged 23) | (Cuba) Villa Clara | Cuban National Series | (Cuba) Sagua La Grande |
| Danny Betancourt | 55 | P | May 27, 1981 (aged 31) | Santiago de Cuba | Cuban National Series | Santiago de Cuba |
| Diosdani Castillo | 21 | P | November 22, 1987 (aged 25) | (Cuba) Villa Clara | Cuban National Series | (Cuba) Havana |
| Odrisamer Despaigne | 43 | P | April 4, 1987 (aged 25) | (Cuba) Industriales | Cuban National Series | (Cuba) Havana |
| Vladimir García | 34 | P | July 4, 1982 (aged 30) | (Cuba) Ciego de Ávila | Cuban National Series | (Cuba) Morón |
| Norberto González | 33 | P | October 10, 1979 (aged 33) | (Cuba) Cienfuegos | Cuban National Series | (Cuba) Cienfuegos |
| Yander Guevara | 26 | P | January 18, 1986 (aged 27) | (Cuba) Ciego de Ávila | Cuban National Series | (Cuba) Ciego de Ávila |
| Raisel Iglesias | 28 | P | April 1, 1990 (aged 22) | (Cuba) Isla de la Juventud | Cuban National Series | (Cuba) Isla de la Juventud |
| Ismel Jiménez | 23 | P | February 10, 1986 (aged 27) | (Cuba) Sancti Spíritus | Cuban National Series | (Cuba) Trinidad |
| Darien Núñez | 53 | P | March 19, 1993 (aged 19) | (Cuba) Las Tunas | Cuban National Series | (Cuba) Las Tunas |
| Yadier Pedroso | 62 | P | June 9, 1986 (aged 26) | (Cuba) La Habana | Cuban National Series | (Cuba) Guanajay |
| Wilber Pérez | 75 | P | October 24, 1976 (aged 36) | (Cuba) Isla de la Juventud | Cuban National Series | (Cuba) Niquero |
| Alexander Rodríguez | 63 | P | December 26, 1982 (aged 30) | (Cuba) Guantánamo | Cuban National Series | (Cuba) Guantánamo |
| Frank Morejon | 45 | C | January 25, 1986 (aged 27) | (Cuba) Industriales | Cuban National Series | (Cuba) Havana |
| Yosvani Peraza | 46 | C | February 9, 1979 (aged 34) | (Cuba) Pinar del Río | Cuban National Series | (Cuba) San Juan y Martínez |
| Eriel Sánchez | 5 | C | May 17, 1975 (aged 37) | (Cuba) Sancti Spíritus | Cuban National Series | (Cuba) Fomento |
| José Abreu | 79 | IF | January 29, 1987 (aged 26) | (Cuba) Cienfuegos | Cuban National Series | (Cuba) Cruces |
| Erisbel Arruebarrena | 11 | IF | March 25, 1990 (aged 22) | (Cuba) Cienfuegos | Cuban National Series | (Cuba) Cienfuegos |
| José Miguel Fernández | 8 | IF | April 27, 1988 (aged 24) | (Cuba) Matanzas | Cuban National Series | (Cuba) Colón |
| Raúl González | 7 | IF | July 22, 1987 (aged 25) | (Cuba) Ciego de Ávila | Cuban National Series | (Cuba) Ciego de Ávila |
| Yulieski Gurriel | 10 | IF | June 9, 1984 (aged 28) | (Cuba) Sancti Spíritus | Cuban National Series | (Cuba) Sancti Spíritus |
| Andy Ibáñez | 12 | IF | April 3, 1993 (aged 19) | (Cuba) Isla de la Juventud | Cuban National Series | (Cuba) Havana |
| Luis Felipe Rivera | 89 | IF | August 10, 1977 (aged 35) | (Cuba) Isla de la Juventud | Cuban National Series | (Cuba) Havana |
| Alexei Bell | 88 | OF | October 2, 1983 (aged 29) | Santiago de Cuba | Cuban National Series | (Cuba) El Caney |
| Frederich Cepeda | 24 | OF | April 8, 1980 (aged 32) | (Cuba) Sancti Spíritus | Cuban National Series | (Cuba) Trinidad |
| Alfredo Despaigne | 54 | OF | June 17, 1986 (aged 26) | (Cuba) Granma | Cuban National Series | (Cuba) Palma Soriano |
| Guillermo Heredia | 17 | OF | January 31, 1991 (aged 22) | (Cuba) Matanzas | Cuban National Series | (Cuba) Matanzas |
| Yasmany Tomás | 27 | OF | November 14, 1990 (aged 22) | (Cuba) Industriales | Cuban National Series | (Cuba) Havana |

=== Japan ===
Manager
Koji Yamamoto
Coaches
Osamu Higashio, Masataka Nashida, Tsuyoshi Yoda, Kazuyoshi Tatsunami, Nobuhiro Takashiro, Koichi Ogata

| Player | No. | Pos. | DOB and age | Team | League | Birthplace |
|---|---|---|---|---|---|---|
| Takeru Imamura | 16 | P | April 17, 1991 (aged 21) | (Japan) Hiroshima Toyo Carp | Nippon Professional Baseball | Sasebo, Nagasaki Prefecture, Japan |
| Kenta Maeda | 20 | P | April 11, 1988 (aged 24) | (Japan) Hiroshima Toyo Carp | Nippon Professional Baseball | Osaka, Japan |
| Kazuhisa Makita | 35 | P | November 10, 1984 (aged 28) | (Japan) Saitama Seibu Lions | Nippon Professional Baseball | Yaizu, Shizuoka Prefecture, Japan |
| Masahiko Morifuku | 21 | P | June 29, 1986 (aged 26) | (Japan) Fukuoka SoftBank Hawks | Nippon Professional Baseball | Toyohashi, Aichi Prefecture, Japan |
| Atsushi Nomi | 14 | P | May 28, 1979 (aged 33) | (Japan) Hanshin Tigers | Nippon Professional Baseball | Izushi, Hyōgo, Japan |
| Kenji Otonari | 28 | P | November 19, 1984 (aged 28) | (Japan) Fukuoka SoftBank Hawks | Nippon Professional Baseball | Kyoto, Japan |
| Hirokazu Sawamura | 15 | P | April 3, 1988 (aged 24) | (Japan) Yomiuri Giants | Nippon Professional Baseball | Tochigi, Japan |
| Tadashi Settsu | 50 | P | June 1, 1982 (aged 30) | (Japan) Fukuoka SoftBank Hawks | Nippon Professional Baseball | Akita, Akita, Japan |
| Toshiya Sugiuchi | 18 | P | October 30, 1980 (aged 32) | (Japan) Yomiuri Giants | Nippon Professional Baseball | Kasuga, Fukuoka, Japan |
| Masahiro Tanaka | 17 | P | November 1, 1988 (aged 24) | (Japan) Tohoku Rakuten Golden Eagles | Nippon Professional Baseball | Itami, Hyōgo, Japan |
| Tetsuya Utsumi | 26 | P | April 29, 1982 (aged 30) | (Japan) Yomiuri Giants | Nippon Professional Baseball | Kyoto, Japan |
| Hideaki Wakui | 11 | P | June 21, 1986 (aged 26) | (Japan) Saitama Seibu Lions | Nippon Professional Baseball | Matsudo, Chiba, Japan |
| Tetsuya Yamaguchi | 47 | P | November 11, 1983 (aged 29) | (Japan) Yomiuri Giants | Nippon Professional Baseball | Yokohama, Japan |
| Shinnosuke Abe | 10 | C | March 20, 1979 (aged 33) | (Japan) Yomiuri Giants | Nippon Professional Baseball | Urayasu, Chiba, Japan |
| Ryoji Aikawa | 2 | C | July 11, 1976 (aged 36) | (Japan) Tokyo Yakult Swallows | Nippon Professional Baseball | Ichikawa, Chiba, Japan |
| Ginjiro Sumitani | 27 | C | July 19, 1987 (aged 25) | (Japan) Saitama Seibu Lions | Nippon Professional Baseball | Kyoto, Japan |
| Yuichi Honda | 46 | IF | November 19, 1984 (aged 28) | (Japan) Fukuoka SoftBank Hawks | Nippon Professional Baseball | Onojo, Fukuoka-ken, Japan |
| Hirokazu Ibata | 3 | IF | May 12, 1975 (aged 37) | (Japan) Chunichi Dragons | Nippon Professional Baseball | Kawasaki, Kanagawa, Japan |
| Nobuhiro Matsuda | 5 | IF | May 17, 1983 (aged 29) | (Japan) Fukuoka SoftBank Hawks | Nippon Professional Baseball | Shiga, Japan |
| Kazuo Matsui | 7 | IF | October 23, 1975 (aged 37) | (Japan) Tohoku Rakuten Golden Eagles | Nippon Professional Baseball | Higashiōsaka, Osaka, Japan |
| Hayato Sakamoto | 6 | IF | December 14, 1988 (aged 24) | (Japan) Yomiuri Giants | Nippon Professional Baseball | Itami, Hyōgo, Japan |
| Takashi Toritani | 1 | IF | June 26, 1981 (aged 31) | (Japan) Hanshin Tigers | Nippon Professional Baseball | Higashimurayama, Tokyo, Japan |
| Hisayoshi Chōno | 34 | OF | December 6, 1984 (aged 28) | (Japan) Yomiuri Giants | Nippon Professional Baseball | Kiyama, Saga, Japan |
| Atsunori Inaba | 41 | OF | August 3, 1972 (aged 40) | (Japan) Hokkaido Nippon-Ham Fighters | Nippon Professional Baseball | Kitanagoya, Aichi, Japan |
| Yoshio Itoi | 9 | OF | July 31, 1981 (aged 31) | (Japan) Orix Buffaloes | Nippon Professional Baseball | Yosano, Kyoto, Japan |
| Katsuya Kakunaka | 61 | OF | May 25, 1987 (aged 25) | (Japan) Chiba Lotte Marines | Nippon Professional Baseball | Nanao, Ishikawa, Japan |
| Sho Nakata | 13 | OF | April 22, 1989 (aged 23) | (Japan) Hokkaido Nippon-Ham Fighters | Nippon Professional Baseball | Hiroshima, Hiroshima Prefecture, Japan |
| Seiichi Uchikawa | 24 | OF | August 4, 1982 (aged 30) | (Japan) Fukuoka SoftBank Hawks | Nippon Professional Baseball | Ōita, Ōita, Japan |

== Pool B ==
=== Australia ===
Manager
Jon Deeble
Coaches
Phil Dale, Michael Collins, Tony Harris, Greg Jelks, Graeme Lloyd, Glenn Williams

Note: All player birthplaces are in Australia unless indicated otherwise.

| Player | No. | Pos. | DOB and age | Team | League | Birthplace |
|---|---|---|---|---|---|---|
| Adam Bright | 10 | P | August 11, 1984 (aged 28) | (Australia) Melbourne Aces | Australian Baseball League | Melbourne, Victoria |
| Steven Kent | 25 | P | May 8, 1989 (aged 23) | (Australia) Canberra Cavalry | Australian Baseball League | Canberra, Australian Capital Territory |
| Shane Lindsay | 32 | P | January 25, 1985 (aged 28) | | | Melbourne, Victoria |
| Chris Oxspring | 35 | P | May 13, 1977 (aged 35) | (Australia) Sydney Blue Sox | Australian Baseball League | Ipswich, Queensland |
| Ryan Rowland-Smith | 18 | P | January 26, 1983 (aged 30) | (United States) Boston Red Sox (minors) | Minor League Baseball | Sydney, New South Wales |
| Andrew Russell | 6 | P | April 27, 1984 (aged 28) | (United States) Atlanta Braves (minors) | Minor League Baseball | Melbourne, Victoria |
| Dushan Ruzic | 38 | P | January 5, 1982 (aged 31) | (Australia) Adelaide Bite | Australian Baseball League | Darwin, Northern Territory |
| Warwick Saupold | 30 | P | January 16, 1990 (aged 23) | (United States) Detroit Tigers (minors) | Major League Baseball | Perth, Western Australia |
| Ryan Searle | 33 | P | June 22, 1989 (aged 23) | (United States) Chicago Cubs (minors) | Minor League Baseball | Brisbane, Queensland |
| Clayton Tanner | 44 | P | December 5, 1987 (aged 25) | | | Mona Vale, New South Wales |
| Brad Thomas | 36 | P | October 12, 1977 (aged 35) | (Taiwan) Brother Elephants | Chinese Professional Baseball League | Sydney, New South Wales |
| Matthew Williams | 19 | P | February 28, 1987 (aged 26) | (United States) Minnesota Twins (minors) | Minor League Baseball | Camden, New South Wales |
| Brendan Wise | 28 | P | January 9, 1986 (aged 27) | (Australia) Perth Heat | Australian Baseball League | Perth, Western Australia |
| Allan de San Miguel | 11 | C | February 1, 1988 (aged 25) | (United States) Baltimore Orioles (minors) | Minor League Baseball | Bentley, Western Australia |
| Matt Kennelly | 7 | C | March 21, 1989 (aged 23) | (United States) Atlanta Braves (minors) | Major League Baseball | East Fremantle, Western Australia |
| James Beresford | 9 | IF | January 19, 1989 (aged 24) | (United States) Minnesota Twins (minors) | Minor League Baseball | Monash, Victoria |
| Josh Davies | 4 | IF | September 12, 1985 (aged 27) | (Australia) Melbourne Aces | Australian Baseball League | Bendigo, Victoria |
| Brad Harman | 12 | IF | November 19, 1985 (aged 27) | (Australia) Melbourne Aces | Australian Baseball League | Melbourne, Victoria |
| Justin Huber | 26 | IF | July 1, 1982 (aged 30) | (Australia) Melbourne Aces | Australian Baseball League | Melbourne, Victoria |
| Luke Hughes | 20 | IF | August 2, 1984 (aged 28) | (Australia) Perth Heat | Australian Baseball League | Perth, Western Australia |
| Mike Walker | 3 | IF | June 12, 1988 (aged 24) | (United States) Milwaukee Brewers (minors) | Minor League Baseball | Marysville, California, United States |
| Stefan Welch | 22 | IF | August 12, 1988 (aged 24) | (United States) Pittsburgh Pirates (minors) | Minor League Baseball | Alice Springs, Northern Territory |
| Corey Adamson | 5 | OF | February 23, 1992 (aged 21) | (United States) San Diego Padres (minors) | Minor League Baseball | Bullsbrook, Western Australia |
| Mitch Dening | 17 | OF | August 17, 1988 (aged 24) | (United States) Boston Red Sox (minors) | Minor League Baseball | Toowoon Bay, New South Wales |
| David Kandilas | 34 | OF | September 14, 1990 (aged 22) | (United States) Colorado Rockies (minors) | Minor League Baseball | Sydney, New South Wales |
| Tim Kennelly | 23 | OF | December 5, 1986 (aged 26) | (United States) Philadelphia Phillies (minors) | Minor League Baseball | Perth, Western Australia |
| Joshua Roberts | 1 | OF | July 17, 1986 (aged 26) | (Australia) Brisbane Bandits | Australian Baseball League | Ipswich, Queensland |
| Chris Snelling | 14 | OF | December 3, 1981 (aged 31) | (Australia) Sydney Blue Sox | Australian Baseball League | North Miami, Florida, United States |

=== Chinese Taipei ===
Manager
Chang-Heng Hsieh
Coaches
Cheng-Hsun Hsieh, Chih-Feng Chen, Wei-Chen Chen, Jung-Hua Liu, Chen-Hao Wang, Chun-Chang Yeh

| Player | No. | Pos. | DOB and age | Team | League | Birthplace |
|---|---|---|---|---|---|---|
| Hung-Wen Chen | 99 | P | February 3, 1986 (aged 27) | (Taiwan) Brother Elephants | Chinese Professional Baseball League | Hualien, Taiwan |
| Chin-Chih Huang | 12 | P | January 18, 1978 (aged 35) | (Taiwan) Lamigo Monkeys | Chinese Professional Baseball League | Kaohsiung City, Taiwan |
| Hong-Chih Kuo | 51 | P | July 23, 1981 (aged 31) | | | Tainan, Taiwan |
| Yi-Hao Lin | 63 | P | January 2, 1991 (aged 22) | (Japan) Yomiuri Giants (farm) | Eastern League | Taipei, Taiwan |
| Yu-Ching Lin | 15 | P | December 29, 1988 (aged 24) | (Taiwan) Brother Elephants | Chinese Professional Baseball League | Chiayi City, Taiwan |
| Ching-Lung Lo | 71 | P | August 20, 1985 (aged 27) | (Taiwan) Uni-President 7-11 Lions | Chinese Professional Baseball League | Qi Shan, Taiwan |
| Wei-Lun Pan | 18 | P | March 5, 1982 (aged 30) | (Taiwan) Uni-President 7-11 Lions | Chinese Professional Baseball League | Pingtung, Taiwan |
| Jen-Ho Tseng | 17 | P | October 3, 1994 (aged 18) | (Taiwan) Kaohsiung Municipal Sanmin Senior High School | | Kaohsiung City, Taiwan |
| Chien-Ming Wang | 40 | P | March 31, 1980 (aged 32) | | | Tainan City, Taiwan |
| Ching-Ming Wang | 41 | P | January 16, 1986 (aged 27) | (Taiwan) Uni-President 7-11 Lions | Chinese Professional Baseball League | Taitung County, Taiwan |
| I-Cheng Wang | 19 | P | October 9, 1985 (aged 27) | (Japan) Yokohama DeNA BayStars | Nippon Professional Baseball | Pingtung County, Taiwan |
| Yao-Lin Wang | 22 | P | February 5, 1991 (aged 22) | (United States) Chicago Cubs (minors) | Minor League Baseball | Taitung County, Taiwan |
| Yao-Hsun Yang | 91 | P | January 22, 1983 (aged 30) | (Japan) Fukuoka SoftBank Hawks | Nippon Professional Baseball | Taitung City, Taiwan |
| Ta-Hung Cheng | 7 | C | January 12, 1981 (aged 32) | (Taiwan) EDA Rhinos | Chinese Professional Baseball League | Taitung County, Taiwan |
| Chih-Kang Kao | 34 | C | February 7, 1981 (aged 32) | (Taiwan) Uni-President 7-11 Lions | Chinese Professional Baseball League | Taichung City, Taiwan |
| Hung-Yu Lin | 11 | C | March 21, 1986 (aged 26) | (Taiwan) Lamigo Monkeys | Chinese Professional Baseball League | Tainan, Taiwan |
| Chiang-Ho Chen | 52 | IF | January 15, 1982 (aged 31) | (Taiwan) Brother Elephants | Chinese Professional Baseball League | Taipei, Taiwan |
| Yung-Chi Chen | 13 | IF | July 13, 1983 (aged 29) | (Taiwan) Uni-President 7-11 Lions | Chinese Professional Baseball League | Taitung County, Taiwan |
| Yen-Wen Kuo | 21 | IF | October 25, 1988 (aged 24) | (Taiwan) Lamigo Monkeys | Chinese Professional Baseball League | Tainan, Taiwan |
| Chih-Sheng Lin | 31 | IF | January 1, 1982 (aged 31) | (Taiwan) Lamigo Monkeys | Chinese Professional Baseball League | Taipei, Taiwan |
| Han Lin | 98 | IF | January 25, 1985 (aged 28) | Taiwan Cooperative Bank baseball team | | Taipei, Taiwan |
| Yi-Chuan Lin | 9 | IF | November 11, 1985 (aged 27) | (Taiwan) EDA Rhinos | Chinese Professional Baseball League | Tainan, Taiwan |
| Cheng-Min Peng | 23 | IF | August 6, 1978 (aged 34) | (Taiwan) Brother Elephants | Chinese Professional Baseball League | Kaohsiung City, Taiwan |
| Cheng-Wei Chang | 59 | OF | August 5, 1986 (aged 26) | (Taiwan) Brother Elephants | Chinese Professional Baseball League | Taitung County, Taiwan |
| Chien-Ming Chang | 66 | OF | July 27, 1980 (aged 32) | (Taiwan) EDA Rhinos | Chinese Professional Baseball League | Hualien County, Taiwan |
| Szu-Chi Chou | 16 | OF | October 26, 1981 (aged 31) | (Taiwan) Brother Elephants | Chinese Professional Baseball League | Hualien County, Taiwan |
| Che-Hsuan Lin | 24 | OF | September 21, 1988 (aged 24) | (United States) Houston Astros (minors) | Minor League Baseball | Hualien County, Taiwan |
| Dai-Kang Yang | 1 | OF | January 17, 1987 (aged 26) | (Japan) Nippon Ham Fighters | Nippon Professional Baseball | Taipei, Taiwan |

=== Netherlands ===
Manager
Hensley Meulens
Coaches
Bert Blyleven, Brian Farley, Steve Janssen, Wim Martinus, Tjerk Smeets, Ben Thijssen

| Player | No. | Pos. | DOB and age | Team | League | Birthplace |
|---|---|---|---|---|---|---|
| Johnny Balentina | 29 | P | August 8, 1971 (aged 41) | | | Willemstad, Curaçao |
| David Bergman | 47 | P | August 16, 1981 (aged 31) | (Netherlands) Kinheim Haarlem | Honkbal Hoofdklasse | Haarlem, Netherlands |
| Leon Boyd | 55 | P | August 30, 1983 (aged 29) | (Netherlands) DOOR Neptunus | Honkbal Hoofdklasse | Vancouver, British Columbia, Canada |
| Rob Cordemans | 19 | P | October 31, 1974 (aged 38) | (United States) Washington Nationals (minors) | Minor League Baseball | Schiedam, South Holland, Netherlands |
| Berry van Driel | 3 | P | December 26, 1984 (aged 28) | (Netherlands) DOOR Neptunus | Honkbal Hoofdklasse | The Hague, Netherlands |
| Kevin Heijstek | 13 | P | April 19, 1988 (aged 24) | (Netherlands) DOOR Neptunus | Honkbal Hoofdklasse | Dordrecht, South Holland, Netherlands |
| Jonatan Isenia | 7 | P | March 31, 1993 (aged 19) | (United States) Baltimore Orioles (minors) | Minor League Baseball | Willemstad, Curaçao |
| Kenley Jansen (Note: Replaced #7 Jonatan Isenia after Round 2) | 45 | P | September 30, 1987 (aged 25) | (United States) Los Angeles Dodgers | Major League Baseball | Willemstad, Curaçao |
| Diego Markwell | 36 | P | August 7, 1980 (aged 32) | (Netherlands) DOOR Neptunus | Honkbal Hoofdklasse | Willemstad, Curaçao |
| Shairon Martis | 39 | P | March 30, 1987 (aged 25) | (United States) Minnesota Twins | Major League Baseball | Willemstad, Curaçao |
| Loek van Mil | 51 | P | September 15, 1984 (aged 28) | (United States) Cincinnati Reds (minors) | Minor League Baseball | Oss, Netherlands |
| Mark Pawelek | 96 | P | August 18, 1986 (aged 26) | | | Springville, Utah, United States |
| Tom Stuifbergen | 26 | P | September 26, 1988 (aged 24) | (United States) Minnesota Twins (minors) | Minor League Baseball | Breda, Netherlands |
| Orlando Yntema | 40 | P | February 21, 1986 (aged 27) | (Netherlands) UVV Utrecht | Honkbal Hoofdklasse | Puerto Plata, Dominican Republic |
| Sebastiaan Nooij | 5 | C | November 26, 1987 (aged 25) | (Netherlands) L&D Amsterdam | Honkbal Hoofdklasse | Amstelveen, Netherlands |
| Dashenko Ricardo | 21 | C | March 1, 1990 (aged 23) | | | Willemstad, Curaçao |
| Xander Bogaerts | 1 | IF | October 1, 1992 (aged 20) | (United States) Boston Red Sox (minors) | Minor League Baseball | San Nicolaas, Aruba |
| Yurendell DeCaster | 22 | IF | September 26, 1979 (aged 33) | (Canada) Winnipeg Goldeyes | American Association | Brievengat, Curaçao |
| Quintin de Cuba | 23 | IF | September 9, 1987 (aged 25) | (Netherlands) Kinheim Haarlem | Honkbal Hoofdklasse | Willemstad, Curaçao |
| Jurickson Profar (Note: Replaced #22 Yurendell DeCaster after Round 2) | 10 | IF | February 20, 1993 (aged 20) | (United States) Texas Rangers | Major League Baseball | Willemstad, Curaçao |
| Jonathan Schoop | 46 | IF | October 16, 1991 (aged 21) | (United States) Baltimore Orioles (minors) | Minor League Baseball | Willemstad, Curaçao |
| Andrelton Simmons | 9 | IF | September 4, 1989 (aged 23) | (United States) Atlanta Braves | Major League Baseball | Mundu-Nobo, Curaçao |
| Curt Smith | 18 | IF | September 9, 1986 (aged 26) | | | Willemstad, Curaçao |
| Hainley Statia | 16 | IF | January 19, 1986 (aged 27) | (United States) Milwaukee Brewers (minors) | Minor League Baseball | Willemstad, Curaçao |
| Wladimir Balentien | 4 | OF | July 2, 1984 (aged 28) | (Japan) Tokyo Yakult Swallows | Nippon Professional Baseball | Willemstad, Curaçao |
| Roger Bernadina | 2 | OF | June 12, 1984 (aged 28) | (United States) Washington Nationals | Major League Baseball | Willemstad, Curaçao |
| Michael Duursma | 8 | OF | February 26, 1978 (aged 35) | (Netherlands) L&D Amsterdam | Honkbal Hoofdklasse | Haarlem, Netherlands |
| Andruw Jones | 25 | OF | April 23, 1977 (aged 35) | (Japan) Tohoku Rakuten Golden Eagles | Nippon Professional Baseball | Willemstad, Curaçao |
| Randolph Oduber | 14 | OF | March 18, 1989 (aged 23) | (United States) Washington Nationals (minors) | Minor League Baseball | Paradera, Aruba |
| Kalian Sams | 12 | OF | August 25, 1986 (aged 26) | (United States) Seattle Mariners (minors) | Minor League Baseball | The Hague, Netherlands |

=== South Korea ===
Manager
Joongil Ryu
Coaches
Yongduk Han, DongSoo Kim, Hansoo Kim, Jungtae Park, Jihyun Ryu, Sangmmoon Yang

| Player | No. | Pos. | DOB and age | Team | League | Birthplace |
|---|---|---|---|---|---|---|
| Woochan Cha | 23 | P | May 31, 1987 (aged 25) | (South Korea) Samsung Lions | Korea Baseball Organization | Gunsan, North Jeolla Province, South Korea |
| Wonjun Jang | 57 | P | July 31, 1985 (aged 27) | (South Korea) Korean Police Baseball Team | KBO Futures League | Seoul, South Korea |
| Taehyon Chong | 38 | P | November 10, 1978 (aged 34) | (South Korea) Lotte Giants | Korea Baseball Organization | Gunsan, South Korea |
| Wonsam Jang | 48 | P | June 9, 1983 (aged 29) | (South Korea) Samsung Lions | Korea Baseball Organization | Changwon, Gyeongsangnam-do, South Korea |
| Kyungeun Noh | 18 | P | March 11, 1984 (aged 28) | (South Korea) Doosan Bears | Korea Baseball Organization | Hampyeong, South Korea |
| Seunghwan Oh | 21 | P | July 15, 1982 (aged 30) | (South Korea) Samsung Lions | Korea Baseball Organization | Jeongeup, Jeollabuk-do, South Korea |
| Heesoo Park | 11 | P | July 13, 1983 (aged 29) | (South Korea) SK Wyverns | Korea Baseball Organization | Daejeon, South Korea |
| Jaeweong Seo | 26 | P | May 24, 1977 (aged 35) | (South Korea) Kia Tigers | Korea Baseball Organization | Gwangju, South Korea |
| Seunglak Son | 1 | P | March 4, 1982 (aged 30) | (South Korea) Nexen Heroes | Korea Baseball Organization | Daegu, South Korea |
| Seungjun Song | 91 | P | June 29, 1980 (aged 32) | (South Korea) Lotte Giants | Korea Baseball Organization | Busan, South Korea |
| Wonsang Yoo | 17 | P | June 17, 1986 (aged 26) | (South Korea) LG Twins | Korea Baseball Organization | Seoul, South Korea |
| Hisang Yoon | 66 | P | May 17, 1986 (aged 26) | (South Korea) SK Wyverns | Korea Baseball Organization | Seoul, South Korea |
| Sukmin Yoon | 28 | P | July 24, 1986 (aged 26) | (South Korea) Kia Tigers | Korea Baseball Organization | Seoul, South Korea |
| Kabyong Jin | 20 | C | May 8, 1974 (aged 38) | (South Korea) Samsung Lions | Korea Baseball Organization | Busan, South Korea |
| Minho Kang | 47 | C | August 18, 1985 (aged 27) | (South Korea) Lotte Giants | Korea Baseball Organization | Jeju City, Jeju-do, South Korea |
| Jeong Choi | 14 | IF | February 28, 1987 (aged 26) | (South Korea) SK Wyverns | Korea Baseball Organization | Incheon, South Korea |
| Keunwoo Jeong | 8 | IF | October 2, 1982 (aged 30) | (South Korea) SK Wyverns | Korea Baseball Organization | Busan, South Korea |
| Jungho Kang | 16 | IF | April 5, 1987 (aged 25) | (South Korea) Nexen Heroes | Korea Baseball Organization | Gwangju, South Korea |
| Sangsu Kim | 7 | IF | March 23, 1990 (aged 22) | (South Korea) Samsung Lions | Korea Baseball Organization | Seoul, South Korea |
| Taekyun Kim | 52 | IF | May 29, 1982 (aged 30) | (South Korea) Hanwha Eagles | Korea Baseball Organization | Cheonan, South Korea |
| Daeho Lee | 25 | IF | June 21, 1982 (aged 30) | (Japan) Orix Buffaloes | Nippon Professional Baseball | Busan, South Korea |
| Seungyeop Lee | 36 | IF | August 18, 1976 (aged 36) | (South Korea) Samsung Lions | Korea Baseball Organization | Daegu, South Korea |
| Sihyun Son | 13 | IF | October 19, 1980 (aged 32) | (South Korea) Doosan Bears | Korea Baseball Organization | Seoul, South Korea |
| Junwoo Jeon | 9 | OF | February 25, 1986 (aged 27) | (South Korea) Lotte Giants | Korea Baseball Organization | Gyeongju, South Korea |
| Hyun-soo Kim | 50 | OF | January 2, 1988 (aged 25) | (South Korea) Doosan Bears | Korea Baseball Organization | Seoul, South Korea |
| Jinyoung Lee | 35 | OF | June 15, 1980 (aged 32) | (South Korea) LG Twins | Korea Baseball Organization | Gunsan, South Korea |
| Yongkyu Lee | 15 | OF | August 26, 1985 (aged 27) | (South Korea) Kia Tigers | Korea Baseball Organization | Gunsan, South Korea |
| Ahseop Son | 31 | OF | March 18, 1988 (aged 24) | (South Korea) Lotte Giants | Korea Baseball Organization | Busan, South Korea |

== Pool C ==
=== Dominican Republic ===
Manager
Tony Peña
Coaches
Bill Castro, José Canó, Félix Fermín, Denny González, Alfredo Griffin, Juan Samuel
Special Assistant
Michael Santiago-Smith

| Player | No. | Pos. | DOB and age | Team | League | Birthplace |
|---|---|---|---|---|---|---|
| Lorenzo Barceló | 75 | P | August 10, 1977 (aged 35) | | | San Pedro de Macorís, Dominican Republic |
| Santiago Casilla | 44 | P | July 25, 1980 (aged 32) | (United States) San Francisco Giants | Major League Baseball | San Cristóbal, Dominican Republic |
| Ángel Castro | 45 | P | November 14, 1982 (aged 30) | | | Santiago, Dominican Republic |
| Juan Cedeño | 36 | P | August 19, 1983 (aged 29) | (United States) New York Yankees (minors) | Minor League Baseball | Higüey, La Altagracia, Dominican Republic |
| Samuel Deduno | 21 | P | July 2, 1983 (aged 29) | (United States) Minnesota Twins | Major League Baseball | Santiago, Dominican Republic |
| Octavio Dotel | 20 | P | November 25, 1973 (aged 39) | (United States) Detroit Tigers | Major League Baseball | Santo Domingo, Dominican Republic |
| Kelvin Herrera | 40 | P | December 31, 1989 (aged 23) | (United States) Kansas City Royals | Major League Baseball | Tenares, Hermanas Mirabal, Dominican Republic |
| Fernando Rodney | 56 | P | March 18, 1977 (aged 35) | (United States) Tampa Bay Rays | Major League Baseball | Samaná, Dominican Republic |
| Wandy Rodríguez | 51 | P | January 18, 1979 (aged 34) | (United States) Pittsburgh Pirates | Major League Baseball | Santiago Rodríguez, Dominican Republic |
| Atahualpa Severino | 65 | P | November 6, 1984 (aged 28) | (United States) Kansas City Royals (minors) | Minor League Baseball | Cotuí, Dominican Republic |
| Alfredo Simón | 31 | P | May 8, 1981 (aged 31) | (United States) Cincinnati Reds | Major League Baseball | Santiago, Dominican Republic |
| Pedro Strop | 64 | P | June 13, 1985 (aged 27) | (United States) Baltimore Orioles | Major League Baseball | San Cristóbal, Dominican Republic |
| José Veras | 48 | P | October 20, 1980 (aged 32) | (United States) Houston Astros | Major League Baseball | Santo Domingo, Dominican Republic |
| Edinson Volquez | 37 | P | July 3, 1983 (aged 29) | (United States) San Diego Padres | Major League Baseball | Barahona, Dominican Republic |
| Francisco Peña | 25 | C | October 12, 1989 (aged 23) | (United States) New York Mets (minors) | Minor League Baseball | Santiago, Dominican Republic |
| Carlos Santana | 41 | C | April 8, 1986 (aged 26) | (United States) Cleveland Indians | Major League Baseball | Santo Domingo, Dominican Republic |
| Erick Aybar | 2 | IF | January 15, 1983 (aged 30) | (United States) Los Angeles Angels | Major League Baseball | Bani, Dominican Republic |
| Robinson Canó | 24 | IF | October 22, 1982 (aged 30) | (United States) New York Yankees | Major League Baseball | San Pedro de Macorís, Dominican Republic |
| Edwin Encarnación | 10 | IF | January 7, 1983 (aged 30) | (Canada) Toronto Blue Jays | Major League Baseball | La Romana, Dominican Republic |
| Leury García | 52 | IF | March 18, 1991 (aged 21) | (United States) Texas Rangers (minors) | Minor League Baseball | Santiago, Dominican Republic |
| Hanley Ramírez | 13 | IF | December 22, 1983 (aged 29) | (United States) Los Angeles Dodgers | Major League Baseball | Samaná, Dominican Republic |
| José Reyes | 7 | IF | June 11, 1983 (aged 29) | (Canada) Toronto Blue Jays | Major League Baseball | Villa González, Santiago, Dominican Republic |
| Miguel Tejada | 4 | IF | May 25, 1974 (aged 38) | (United States) Kansas City Royals | Major League Baseball | Bani, Dominican Republic |
| Nelson Cruz | 17 | OF | July 1, 1980 (aged 32) | (United States) Texas Rangers | Major League Baseball | Monte Cristi, Dominican Republic |
| Alejandro De Aza | 30 | OF | April 11, 1984 (aged 28) | (United States) Chicago White Sox | Major League Baseball | Guaymate, Dominican Republic |
| Ricardo Nanita | 32 | OF | June 12, 1981 (aged 31) | (Canada) Toronto Blue Jays (minors) | Minor League Baseball | Santo Domingo, Dominican Republic |
| Moisés Sierra | 14 | OF | September 24, 1988 (aged 24) | (Canada) Toronto Blue Jays | Major League Baseball | Santo Domingo, Dominican Republic |

=== Puerto Rico ===
Manager
Edwin Rodríguez
Coaches
Ricky Bones, Carlos Baerga, Carlos Delgado, Joey Espada, José Rosado, José Valentín

| Player | No. | Pos. | DOB and age | Team | League | Birthplace |
|---|---|---|---|---|---|---|
| Giancarlo Alvarado | 31 | P | January 25, 1978 (aged 35) | (Japan) Yokohama DeNA BayStars | Nippon Professional Baseball | Santurce, San Juan, Puerto Rico |
| José Berríos | 37 | P | May 27, 1994 (aged 18) | (United States) Minnesota Twins (minors) | Minor League Baseball | Bayamón, Puerto Rico |
| Hiram Burgos | 54 | P | August 4, 1987 (aged 25) | (United States) Milwaukee Brewers (minors) | Minor League Baseball | Cayey, Puerto Rico |
| Fernando Cabrera | 38 | P | November 16, 1981 (aged 31) | (United States) Los Angeles Angels of Anaheim (minors) | Minor League Baseball | Toa Baja, Puerto Rico |
| Xavier Cedeño | 55 | P | August 26, 1986 (aged 26) | (United States) Houston Astros | Major League Baseball | Guayanilla, Puerto Rico |
| José De La Torre | 52 | P | October 17, 1985 (aged 27) | (United States) Boston Red Sox (minors) | Minor League Baseball | San Juan, Puerto Rico |
| Nelson Figueroa | 27 | P | May 18, 1974 (aged 38) | (United States) Arizona Diamondbacks(minors) | Minor League Baseball | Brooklyn, New York, United States |
| Efrain Nieves | 65 | P | November 15, 1989 (aged 23) | (Canada) Toronto Blue Jays (minors) | Minor League Baseball | Caguas, Puerto Rico |
| Orlando Román | 34 | P | November 28, 1978 (aged 34) | (Japan) Tokyo Yakult Swallows | Nippon Professional Baseball | Bayamón, Puerto Rico |
| J. C. Romero | 32 | P | June 4, 1976 (aged 36) | | | Río Piedras, Puerto Rico |
| Andres Santiago | 48 | P | October 26, 1989 (aged 23) | (United States) Los Angeles Dodgers(minors) | Minor League Baseball | Catano, Puerto Rico |
| Mario Santiago | 53 | P | December 16, 1984 (aged 28) | (United States) Los Angeles Dodgers(minors) | Minor League Baseball | Guyama, Puerto Rico |
| Giovanni Soto | 35 | P | May 18, 1991 (aged 21) | (United States) Cleveland Indians (minors) | Minor League Baseball | Carolina, Puerto Rico |
| Martín Maldonado | 24 | C | August 16, 1986 (aged 26) | (United States) Milwaukee Brewers | Major League Baseball | Naguabo, Puerto Rico |
| José Molina | 28 | C | June 3, 1975 (aged 37) | (United States) Tampa Bay Rays | Major League Baseball | Bayamón, Puerto Rico |
| Yadier Molina | 4 | C | July 13, 1982 (aged 30) | (United States) St. Louis Cardinals | Major League Baseball | Bayamón, Puerto Rico |
| Mike Avilés | 10 | IF | March 13, 1981 (aged 31) | (United States) Cleveland Indians | Major League Baseball | New York City, New York, United States |
| Irving Falu | 19 | IF | June 6, 1983 (aged 29) | (United States) Kansas City Royals | Major League Baseball | Hato Rey, Puerto Rico |
| Luis Figueroa | 3 | IF | February 16, 1974 (aged 39) | | | Bayamón, Puerto Rico |
| Andy González | 26 | IF | December 15, 1981 (aged 31) | (United States) Chicago White Sox (minors) | Minor League Baseball | Río Piedras, Puerto Rico |
| Carlos Rivera | 44 | IF | June 10, 1978 (aged 34) | (Mexico) Rojos del Águila de Veracruz | Mexican League | Fajardo, Puerto Rico |
| Pedro Valdés | 20 | IF | June 29, 1973 (aged 39) | (Mexico) Acereros de Monclova | Mexican League | Fajardo, Puerto Rico |
| Carlos Beltrán | 15 | OF | April 24, 1977 (aged 35) | (United States) St. Louis Cardinals | Major League Baseball | Manatí, Puerto Rico |
| Jesús Feliciano | 13 | OF | June 6, 1979 (aged 33) | | | Bayamón, Puerto Rico |
| Ángel Pagán | 16 | OF | July 2, 1981 (aged 31) | (United States) San Francisco Giants | Major League Baseball | Río Piedras, Puerto Rico |
| Alex Ríos | 51 | OF | February 18, 1981 (aged 32) | (United States) Chicago White Sox | Major League Baseball | Coffee, Alabama, United States |
| Eddie Rosario | 17 | OF | September 28, 1991 (aged 21) | (United States) Minnesota Twins (minors) | Minor League Baseball | Guayama, Puerto Rico |

=== Spain ===
Manager
Mauro Mazzotti
Coaches
Renny Duarte, Felix Cano, Candelario Diaz, Manny Crespo, José Alguacil, Miguel Erroz

| Player | No. | Pos. | DOB and age | Team | League | Birthplace |
|---|---|---|---|---|---|---|
| Richard Castillo | 33 | P | October 11, 1989 (aged 23) | (United States) St. Louis Cardinals (minors) | Minor League Baseball | Barquisimeto, Venezuela |
| Rhiner Cruz | 55 | P | November 1, 1986 (aged 26) | (United States) Houston Astros | Major League Baseball | Santo Domingo, Dominican Republic |
| Eric González | 26 | P | September 5, 1985 (aged 27) | (United States) Lake Erie Crushers | Frontier League | San Juan de la Rambla, Canary Islands |
| Iván Granados | 35 | P | September 30, 1985 (aged 27) | | | San Carlos, Venezuela |
| Ricardo Hernández | 94 | P | January 23, 1988 (aged 25) | (Spain) Beisbol Barcelona | División de Honor de Béisbol | Caracas, Venezuela |
| Chris Manno | 28 | P | November 4, 1988 (aged 24) | (United States) Cincinnati Reds (minors) | Minor League Baseball | Brooklyn, New York, United States |
| Eduardo Morlán | 30 | P | March 1, 1986 (aged 27) | (United States) Southern Maryland Blue Crabs | Atlantic League | Havana, Cuba |
| Leslie Nacar | 16 | P | June 20, 1983 (aged 29) | (Spain) Tenerife Marlins | División de Honor de Béisbol | Libertad de Banimas, Venezuela |
| Yoanner Negrin | 69 | P | April 29, 1984 (aged 28) | (United States) Chicago Cubs (minors) | Minor League Baseball | Havana, Cuba |
| Antonio Noguera | 75 | P | February 26, 1988 (aged 25) | (Italy) Novara United | Italian Baseball League | Caracas, Venezuela |
| Sergio Pérez | 56 | P | December 5, 1984 (aged 28) | | | Tampa, Florida, United States |
| Richard Salazar | 34 | P | September 6, 1981 (aged 31) | (United States) Sioux City Explorers | American Association | Caracas, Venezuela |
| Nick Schumacher | 24 | P | June 24, 1985 (aged 27) | (United States) Sioux City Explorers | American Association | Wayne, Nebraska, United States |
| Salomón Manríquez | 25 | C | September 15, 1982 (aged 30) | (United States) Lincoln Saltdogs | American Association | Valencia, Venezuela |
| Adrián Nieto | 32 | C | November 12, 1989 (aged 23) | (United States) Washington Nationals (minors) | Minor League Baseball | La Habana, Cuba |
| Blake Ochoa | 3 | C | September 5, 1985 (aged 27) | | | Maracay, Venezuela |
| Bárbaro Cañizares | 45 | IF | November 21, 1979 (aged 33) | (Canada) Winnipeg Goldeyes | American Association | Havana, Cuba |
| Paco Figueroa | 10 | IF | February 19, 1983 (aged 30) | (United States) Southern Maryland Blue Crabs | Atlantic League | Miami, Florida, United States |
| Jesús Golindano | 19 | IF | January 13, 1984 (aged 29) | (Spain) Beisbol Barcelona | División de Honor de Béisbol | Maturín, Venezuela |
| Jesús Merchán | 4 | IF | March 26, 1981 (aged 31) | (United States) San Diego Padres (minors) | Minor League Baseball | Aragua, Venezuela |
| Nestor Pérez | 6 | IF | November 24, 1976 (aged 36) | | | Matanzas, Cuba |
| Yunesky Sánchez | 22 | IF | May 3, 1984 (aged 28) | (United States) Laredo Lemurs | American Association | Matanzas, Cuba |
| Rafael Álvarez | 63 | OF | January 22, 1977 (aged 36) | | | Valencia, Venezuela |
| Engel Beltré | 7 | OF | November 1, 1989 (aged 23) | (United States) Texas Rangers (minors) | Minor League Baseball | Santo Domingo, Dominican Republic |
| José Cruz | 54 | OF | September 4, 1984 (aged 28) | (Italy) Lodi | Italian Baseball League | Santo Domingo, Dominican Republic |
| Daniel Figueroa | 11 | OF | February 19, 1983 (aged 30) | | | Miami, Florida, United States |
| Yasser Gómez | 5 | OF | April 1, 1980 (aged 32) | (United States) McAllen Thunder | North American League | Cienfuegos, Cuba |
| Gabe Suárez | 20 | OF | December 14, 1984 (aged 28) | (United States) Texas Rangers (minors) | Minor League Baseball | Denver, Colorado, United States |

=== Venezuela ===
Manager
Luis Dorante, Luis Sojo
Coaches
Wilson Álvarez, Marco Davalillo, Sr., Andrés Galarraga, Carlos García, Omar Malave

| Player | No. | Pos. | DOB and age | Team | League | Birthplace |
|---|---|---|---|---|---|---|
| Henderson Álvarez | 37 | P | April 18, 1990 (aged 22) | (United States) Miami Marlins | Major League Baseball | Valencia, Venezuela |
| Ronald Belisario | 51 | P | December 31, 1982 (aged 30) | (United States) Los Angeles Dodgers | Major League Baseball | Maracay, Venezuela |
| Jhoulys Chacín | 45 | P | January 7, 1988 (aged 25) | (United States) Colorado Rockies | Major League Baseball | Maracaibo, Venezuela |
| Enrique González | 31 | P | July 14, 1982 (aged 30) | (Japan) Saitama Seibu Lions | Nippon Professional Baseball | Bolivar, Venezuela |
| Deolis Guerra | 32 | P | April 17, 1989 (aged 23) | (United States) Minnesota Twins | Major League Baseball | San Felix, Venezuela |
| César Jiménez | 36 | P | November 27, 1984 (aged 28) | (United States) Philadelphia Phillies (minors) | Minor League Baseball | Cumaná, Sucre, Venezuela |
| Wil Ledezma | 47 | P | January 21, 1981 (aged 32) | (Japan) Chiba Lotte Marines | Nippon Professional Baseball | Valle de la Pascua, Guárico, Venezuela |
| Ramón A. Ramírez | 71 | P | September 16, 1982 (aged 30) | (Mexico) Leones de Yucatán | Mexican League | Cagua, Venezuela |
| Juan Rincón | 39 | P | January 23, 1979 (aged 34) | | | Maracaibo, Venezuela |
| Francisco Rodríguez | 57 | P | January 7, 1982 (aged 31) | (United States) Baltimore Orioles | Major League Baseball | Caracas, Venezuela |
| Aníbal Sánchez | 27 | P | February 27, 1984 (aged 29) | (United States) Detroit Tigers | Major League Baseball | Maracay, Venezuela |
| Rómulo Sánchez | 2 | P | April 28, 1984 (aged 28) | (United States) Tampa Bay Rays (minors) | Minor League Baseball | Carora, Venezuela |
| Alex Torres | 54 | P | December 8, 1987 (aged 25) | (United States) Tampa Bay Rays | Major League Baseball | Valencia, Venezuela |
| Carlos Zambrano | 38 | P | June 1, 1981 (aged 31) | | | Puerto Cabello, Venezuela |
| Ramón Hernández | 55 | C | May 20, 1976 (aged 36) | (United States) Colorado Rockies | Major League Baseball | Caracas, Venezuela |
| Miguel Montero | 26 | C | July 9, 1983 (aged 29) | (United States) Arizona Diamondbacks | Major League Baseball | Caracas, Venezuela |
| Salvador Pérez | 15 | C | May 10, 1990 (aged 22) | (United States) Kansas City Royals | Major League Baseball | Valencia, Venezuela |
| Elvis Andrus | 1 | IF | August 26, 1988 (aged 24) | (United States) Texas Rangers | Major League Baseball | Maracay, Venezuela |
| Asdrúbal Cabrera | 13 | IF | November 13, 1985 (aged 27) | (United States) Cleveland Indians | Major League Baseball | Puerto la Cruz, Venezuela |
| Miguel Cabrera | 24 | IF | April 18, 1983 (aged 29) | (United States) Detroit Tigers | Major League Baseball | Maracay, Venezuela |
| Omar Infante | 4 | IF | December 26, 1981 (aged 31) | (United States) Detroit Tigers | Major League Baseball | Puerto la Cruz, Venezuela |
| Mario Lisson | 18 | IF | May 31, 1984 (aged 28) | | | Caracas, Venezuela |
| Pablo Sandoval | 48 | IF | August 11, 1986 (aged 26) | (United States) San Francisco Giants | Major League Baseball | Puerto Cabello, Venezuela |
| Marco Scutaro | 19 | IF | October 30, 1975 (aged 37) | (United States) San Francisco Giants | Major League Baseball | San Felipe, Venezuela |
| Carlos González | 5 | OF | December 4, 1985 (aged 27) | (United States) Colorado Rockies | Major League Baseball | Maracaibo, Venezuela |
| Gerardo Parra | 9 | OF | May 6, 1987 (aged 25) | (United States) Arizona Diamondbacks | Major League Baseball | Santa Barbara del Zulia, Venezuela |
| Martín Prado | 12 | OF | October 27, 1983 (aged 29) | (United States) Arizona Diamondbacks | Major League Baseball | Maracay, Venezuela |
| Alex Romero | 28 | OF | September 9, 1983 (aged 29) | (Mexico) Tigres de Quintana Roo | Mexican League | Maracaibo, Venezuela |

== Pool D ==
=== Canada ===
Manager
Ernie Whitt
Coaches
Larry Walker, Denis Boucher, Stubby Clapp, Greg Hamilton, Tim Leiper, Paul Quantrill

Note: All player birthplaces are in Canada unless indicated otherwise.

| Player | No. | Pos. | DOB and age | Team | League | Birthplace |
|---|---|---|---|---|---|---|
| Andrew Albers | 27 | P | October 6, 1985 (aged 27) | (United States) Minnesota Twins (minors) | Minor League Baseball | North Battleford, Saskatchewan |
| Phillippe Aumont | 17 | P | January 7, 1989 (aged 24) | (United States) Philadelphia Phillies | Major League Baseball | Gatineau, Quebec |
| John Axford | 59 | P | April 1, 1983 (aged 29) | (United States) Milwaukee Brewers | Major League Baseball | Simcoe, Ontario |
| Jesse Crain | 28 | P | July 5, 1981 (aged 31) | (United States) Chicago White Sox | Major League Baseball | Toronto, Ontario |
| Mark Hardy | 26 | P | May 3, 1988 (aged 24) | (United States) San Diego Padres (minors) | Minor League Baseball | Campbell River, British Columbia |
| Jim Henderson | 51 | P | October 21, 1982 (aged 30) | (United States) Milwaukee Brewers | Major League Baseball | Calgary, Alberta |
| Shawn Hill | 45 | P | April 28, 1981 (aged 31) | (United States) Detroit Tigers | Major League Baseball | Mississauga, Ontario |
| Jay Johnson | 57 | P | December 21, 1989 (aged 23) | (United States) Philadelphia Phillies (minors) | Minor League Baseball | Sussex Corner, New Brunswick |
| Chris Leroux | 63 | P | April 14, 1984 (aged 28) | (United States) Pittsburgh Pirates | Major League Baseball | Montreal, Quebec |
| Trystan Magnuson | 38 | P | June 6, 1985 (aged 27) | (Canada) Toronto Blue Jays (minors) | Minor League Baseball | Vancouver, British Columbia |
| Scott Mathieson | 47 | P | February 27, 1984 (aged 29) | (Japan) Yomiuri Giants | Nippon Professional Baseball | Vancouver, British Columbia |
| Dustin Molleken | 35 | P | August 21, 1984 (aged 28) | (Japan) Hokkaido Nippon-Ham Fighters | Nippon Professional Baseball | Regina, Saskatchewan |
| Jameson Taillon | 18 | P | November 18, 1991 (aged 21) | (United States) Pittsburgh Pirates (minors) | Minor League Baseball | Winter Haven, Florida, United States |
| Chris Robinson | 30 | C | May 12, 1984 (aged 28) | (United States) Baltimore Orioles (minors) | Minor League Baseball | London, Ontario |
| John Suomi | 55 | C | October 5, 1980 (aged 32) | (United States) Kansas City Royals (minors) | Minor League Baseball | Toronto, Ontario |
| Taylor Green | 5 | IF | November 2, 1986 (aged 26) | (United States) Milwaukee Brewers | Major League Baseball | Comox, British Columbia |
| Cale Iorg | 16 | IF | September 6, 1985 (aged 27) | (United States) Detroit Tigers (minors) | Minor League Baseball | Toronto, Ontario |
| Brett Lawrie | 13 | IF | January 18, 1990 (aged 23) | (Canada) Toronto Blue Jays | Major League Baseball | Langley, British Columbia |
| Jonathan Malo | 11 | IF | September 29, 1983 (aged 29) | (Canada) Québec Capitales | Can-Am League | Joliette, Quebec |
| Justin Morneau | 33 | IF | May 15, 1981 (aged 31) | (United States) Minnesota Twins | Major League Baseball | New Westminster, British Columbia |
| Pete Orr | 4 | IF | June 8, 1979 (aged 33) | (United States) Philadelphia Phillies | Major League Baseball | Richmond Hill, Ontario |
| Jimmy Van Ostrand | 29 | IF | August 7, 1984 (aged 28) | (United States) Washington Nationals (minors) | Minor League Baseball | Vancouver, British Columbia |
| Joey Votto | 19 | IF | September 10, 1983 (aged 29) | (United States) Cincinnati Reds | Major League Baseball | Toronto, Ontario |
| Tyson Gillies | 24 | OF | October 31, 1988 (aged 24) | (United States) Philadelphia Phillies (minors) | Minor League Baseball | Vancouver, British Columbia |
| Adam Loewen | 21 | OF | April 9, 1984 (aged 28) | (Canada) Toronto Blue Jays (minors) | Minor League Baseball | Surrey, British Columbia |
| Michael Saunders | 20 | OF | November 19, 1986 (aged 26) | (United States) Seattle Mariners | Major League Baseball | Victoria, British Columbia |
| Rene Tosoni | 9 | OF | July 2, 1986 (aged 27) | (United States) Milwaukee Brewers (minors) | Minor League Baseball | Toronto, Ontario |
| Tim Smith | 14 | DH | June 14, 1986 (aged 26) | (United States) Atlanta Braves (minors) | Minor League Baseball | Toronto, Ontario |

=== Italy ===
Manager
Marco Mazzieri
Coaches
William Holmberg, Frank Catalanotto, Alberto D'Auria, Gilberto Gerali, Mike Piazza, Tom Trebelhorn

| Player | No. | Pos. | DOB and age | Team | League | Birthplace |
|---|---|---|---|---|---|---|
| Marco Grifantini | 21 | P | September 17, 1985 (aged 27) | (Italy) Cariparma Parma | Italian Baseball League | Yreka, California, United States |
| Chris Cooper | 30 | P | October 31, 1978 (aged 34) | San Marino Baseball Club | Italian Baseball League | Pittsburgh, Pennsylvania, United States |
| Tim Crabbe | 48 | P | February 20, 1988 (aged 25) | (United States) Cincinnati Reds (minors) | Minor League Baseball | Tucson, Arizona, United States |
| Tiago Da Silva | 35 | P | March 28, 1985 (aged 27) | San Marino Baseball Club | Italian Baseball League | São Paulo, Brazil |
| Jason Grilli | 39 | P | November 11, 1976 (aged 36) | (United States) Pittsburgh Pirates | Major League Baseball | Royal Oak, Michigan, United States |
| Alex Maestri | 17 | P | June 1, 1985 (aged 27) | (Japan) Orix Buffaloes | Nippon Professional Baseball | Cesena, Italy |
| John Mariotti | 33 | P | August 19, 1984 (aged 28) | (Canada) Québec Capitales | Can-Am League | Vaughn, Ontario, Canada |
| Luca Panerati | 34 | P | December 2, 1989 (aged 23) | (Italy) Fortitudo Bologna | Italian Baseball League | Grosseto, Tuscany, Italy |
| Nick Pugliese | 28 | P | September 18, 1985 (aged 27) | (Italy) Fortitudo Bologna | Italian Baseball League | Plainville, Connecticut, United States |
| Dan Serafini | 29 | P | January 25, 1974 (aged 39) | (United States) Bridgeport Bluefish | Atlantic League | San Francisco, California, United States |
| Brian Sweeney | 19 | P | June 14, 1974 (aged 38) | (Venezuela) Cardenales de Lara | Venezuelan Professional Baseball League | Yonkers, New York State |
| Matt Torra | 43 | P | June 29, 1984 (aged 28) | (United States) Washington Nationals (minors) | Minor League Baseball | Pittsfield, Massachusetts, United States |
| Pat Venditte | 20 | P | June 30, 1985 (aged 27) | (United States) New York Yankees (minors) | Minor League Baseball | Omaha, Nebraska, United States |
| Drew Butera | 41 | C | August 9, 1983 (aged 29) | (United States) Minnesota Twins | Major League Baseball | Evansville, Illinois, United States |
| Tyler LaTorre | 32 | C | April 22, 1983 (aged 29) | (United States) San Francisco Giants (minors) | Minor League Baseball | Santa Cruz, California, United States |
| Chris Colabello | 25 | IF | October 24, 1983 (aged 29) | (Mexico) Algodoneros de Guasave | Mexican Pacific League | Framingham, Massachusetts, United States |
| Mike Costanzo | 4 | IF | September 9, 1983 (aged 29) | (United States) Washington Nationals (minors) | Minor League Baseball | Philadelphia, Pennsylvania, United States |
| Anthony Granato | 3 | IF | March 18, 1981 (aged 31) | | | Toronto, Ontario, Canada |
| Juan Infante | 6 | IF | October 8, 1981 (aged 31) | (Italy) Fortitudo Bologna | Italian Baseball League | Caracas, Venezuela |
| Alex Liddi | 16 | IF | August 14, 1988 (aged 24) | (United States) Seattle Mariners | Major League Baseball | Sanremo, Italy |
| Nick Punto | 8 | IF | November 8, 1977 (aged 35) | (United States) Los Angeles Dodgers | Major League Baseball | San Diego, California, United States |
| Anthony Rizzo | 44 | IF | August 9, 1989 (aged 23) | (United States) Chicago Cubs | Major League Baseball | Fort Lauderdale, Florida, United States |
| Jack Santora | 1 | IF | October 6, 1976 (aged 36) | (Italy) Rimini Baseball Club | Italian Baseball League | Monterey, California, United States |
| Alessandro Vaglio | 18 | IF | January 28, 1989 (aged 24) | (Italy) Fortitudo Bologna | Italian Baseball League | Montefiascone, Italy |
| Lorenzo Avagnina | 10 | OF | November 14, 1980 (aged 32) | San Marino Baseball Club | Italian Baseball League | Fossano, Cuneo, Italy |
| Mario Chiarini | 45 | OF | January 7, 1981 (aged 32) | (Italy) Rimini Baseball Club | Italian Baseball League | Rimini, Italy |
| Chris Denorfia | 11 | OF | July 15, 1980 (aged 32) | (United States) San Diego Padres | Major League Baseball | Bristol, Connecticut, United States |
| Stefano Desimoni | 50 | OF | April 12, 1988 (aged 24) | (Italy) Cariparma Parma | Italian Baseball League | Parma, Emilia-Romagna, Italy |

=== Mexico ===
Manager
Rick Renteria
Coaches
Rubén Amaro, Juan Castro, Teddy Higuera, Ever Magallanes, Sid Monge, Fernando Valenzuela

Note: All player birthplaces are in Mexico unless indicated otherwise.

| Player | No. | Pos. | DOB and age | Team | League | Birthplace |
|---|---|---|---|---|---|---|
| Alfredo Aceves | 91 | P | December 8, 1982 (aged 30) | (United States) Boston Red Sox | Major League Baseball | San Luis Río Colorado, Sonora |
| Marco Estrada | 41 | P | July 5, 1983 (aged 29) | (United States) Milwaukee Brewers | Major League Baseball | Ciudad Obregón, Sonora |
| Yovani Gallardo | 49 | P | February 27, 1986 (aged 27) | (United States) Milwaukee Brewers | Major League Baseball | Penjamillo, Michoacán |
| Rodrigo López | 13 | P | December 14, 1975 (aged 37) | (United States) Philadelphia Phillies | Major League Baseball | Tlalnepantla de Baz, State of Mexico |
| Luis Mendoza | 39 | P | October 31, 1983 (aged 29) | (United States) Kansas City Royals | Major League Baseball | Veracruz, Veracruz |
| Óliver Pérez | 46 | P | August 15, 1981 (aged 31) | (United States) Seattle Mariners | Major League Baseball | Culiacán, Sinaloa |
| Horacio Ramírez | 42 | P | November 24, 1979 (aged 33) | | | Carson, California, United States |
| Cesar Ramos | 27 | P | June 22, 1984 (aged 28) | (United States) Tampa Bay Rays | Major League Baseball | Los Angeles, United States |
| Dennys Reyes | 52 | P | April 19, 1977 (aged 35) | (Mexico) Naranjeros de Hermosillo | Mexican Pacific League | Higuera de Zaragoza, Sinaloa |
| Francisco Rodríguez | 45 | P | February 26, 1983 (aged 30) | | | Mexicali, Baja California |
| Sergio Romo | 54 | P | March 4, 1982 (aged 30) | (United States) San Francisco Giants | Major League Baseball | Brawley, California, United States |
| Fernando Salas | 59 | P | May 30, 1985 (aged 27) | (United States) St. Louis Cardinals | Major League Baseball | Huatabampo, Sonora |
| Óscar Villarreal | 56 | P | November 22, 1981 (aged 31) | (United States) Boston Red Sox (minors) | Minor League Baseball | San Nicolás de los Garza, Nuevo León |
| José Félix | 74 | C | June 28, 1988 (aged 24) | (United States) Texas Rangers (minors) | Minor League Baseball | Guasave, Sinaloa |
| Alí Solís | 64 | C | September 29, 1987 (aged 25) | (United States) Pittsburgh Pirates | Major League Baseball | Mexicali, Baja California |
| Sebastian Valle | 62 | C | July 24, 1990 (aged 22) | (United States) Philadelphia Phillies (minors) | Minor League Baseball | Los Mochis, Sinaloa |
| Jorge Cantú | 3 | IF | January 30, 1982 (aged 31) | (Mexico) Naranjeros de Hermosillo | Mexican Pacific League | McAllen, Texas, United States |
| Luis Cruz | 47 | IF | February 10, 1984 (aged 29) | (United States) Los Angeles Dodgers | Major League Baseball | Navojoa, Sonora |
| Adrián González | 23 | IF | May 8, 1982 (aged 30) | (United States) Los Angeles Dodgers | Major League Baseball | San Diego, California, United States |
| Edgar Gonzalez | 8 | IF | June 14, 1978 (aged 34) | (United States) Chicago Cubs | Major League Baseball | San Diego, California, United States |
| Walter Ibarra | 25 | IF | November 1, 1987 (aged 25) | (United States) New York Yankees (minors) | Minor League Baseball | Los Mochis, Sinaloa |
| Efren Navarro | 68 | IF | May 14, 1986 (aged 26) | (United States) Los Angeles Angels of Anaheim (minors) | Minor League Baseball | Las Vegas, Nevada, United States |
| Ramiro Peña | 19 | IF | July 18, 1985 (aged 27) | (United States) Atlanta Braves | Major League Baseball | Monterrey, Nuevo León |
| Gil Velasquez | 21 | IF | October 17, 1979 (aged 33) | (United States) New York Yankees | Major League Baseball | Los Angeles, United States |
| Eduardo Arredondo | 14 | OF | October 15, 1984 (aged 28) | (Mexico) Olmecas de Tabasco & (Mexico) Algodoneros de Guasave | Mexican League & Mexican Pacific League | Salmoral, Veracruz |
| Karim García | 95 | OF | October 29, 1975 (aged 37) | (Mexico) Sultanes de Monterrey & (Mexico) Naranjeros de Hermosillo | Mexican League & Mexican Pacific League | Ciudad Obregón, Sonora |
| Luis A. García | 18 | OF | May 11, 1978 (aged 34) | (Japan) Tohoku Rakuten Golden Eagles | Nippon Professional Baseball | Guadalajara, Jalisco |

=== United States ===
Manager
Joe Torre
Coaches
Larry Bowa, Marcel Lachemann, Greg Maddux, Dale Murphy, Gerald Perry, Willie Randolph

Note: All player birthplaces are in the United States.

| Player | No. | Pos. | DOB and age | Team | League | Birthplace |
|---|---|---|---|---|---|---|
| Jeremy Affeldt | 41 | P | June 6, 1979 (aged 33) | (United States) San Francisco Giants | Major League Baseball | Phoenix, Arizona |
| Heath Bell | 21 | P | September 29, 1977 (aged 35) | (United States) Arizona Diamondbacks | Major League Baseball | Oceanside, California |
| Mitchell Boggs | 33 | P | February 15, 1984 (aged 29) | (United States) St. Louis Cardinals | Major League Baseball | Dalton, Georgia |
| Steve Cishek | 31 | P | June 18, 1986 (aged 26) | (United States) Miami Marlins | Major League Baseball | Falmouth, Massachusetts |
| Tim Collins | 55 | P | August 21, 1989 (aged 23) | (United States) Kansas City Royals | Major League Baseball | Worcester, Massachusetts |
| Ross Detwiler | 48 | P | March 6, 1986 (aged 26) | (United States) Washington Nationals | Major League Baseball | St. Louis, Missouri |
| R. A. Dickey | 43 | P | October 29, 1974 (aged 38) | (Canada) Toronto Blue Jays | Major League Baseball | Nashville, Tennessee |
| Gio González | 47 | P | September 19, 1985 (aged 27) | (United States) Washington Nationals | Major League Baseball | Hialeah, Florida |
| Luke Gregerson | 57 | P | May 14, 1984 (aged 28) | (United States) San Diego Padres | Major League Baseball | Park Ridge, Illinois |
| David Hernandez | 26 | P | May 13, 1985 (aged 27) | (United States) Arizona Diamondbacks | Major League Baseball | Sacramento, California |
| Derek Holland | 45 | P | October 9, 1986 (aged 26) | (United States) Texas Rangers | Major League Baseball | Newark, Ohio |
| Craig Kimbrel | 46 | P | May 28, 1988 (aged 24) | (United States) Atlanta Braves | Major League Baseball | Huntsville, Alabama |
| Glen Perkins | 15 | P | March 2, 1983 (aged 30) | (United States) Minnesota Twins | Major League Baseball | Stillwater, Minnesota |
| Vinnie Pestano | 52 | P | February 20, 1985 (aged 28) | (United States) Cleveland Indians | Major League Baseball | Huntington Beach, California |
| Ryan Vogelsong | 32 | P | July 22, 1977 (aged 35) | (United States) San Francisco Giants | Major League Baseball | Charlotte, North Carolina |
| J. P. Arencibia | 9 | C | January 5, 1986 (aged 27) | (Canada) Toronto Blue Jays | Major League Baseball | Miami, Florida |
| Jonathan Lucroy | 20 | C | June 13, 1986 (aged 26) | (United States) Milwaukee Brewers | Major League Baseball | Eustis, Florida |
| Joe Mauer | 7 | C | April 19, 1983 (aged 29) | (United States) Minnesota Twins | Major League Baseball | St. Paul, Minnesota |
| Willie Bloomquist | 18 | IF | November 27, 1977 (aged 35) | (United States) Arizona Diamondbacks | Major League Baseball | Port Orchard, Washington |
| Brandon Phillips | 4 | IF | June 28, 1981 (aged 31) | (United States) Cincinnati Reds | Major League Baseball | Raleigh, North Carolina |
| Jimmy Rollins | 11 | IF | November 27, 1978 (aged 34) | (United States) Philadelphia Phillies | Major League Baseball | Oakland, California |
| Eric Hosmer | 25 | IF | October 24, 1989 (aged 23) | (United States) Kansas City Royals | Major League Baseball | Miami, Florida |
| David Wright | 5 | IF | December 20, 1982 (aged 30) | (United States) New York Mets | Major League Baseball | Norfolk, Virginia |
| Ben Zobrist | 18 | IF | May 26, 1981 (aged 31) | (United States) Tampa Bay Rays | Major League Baseball | Eureka, Illinois |
| Ryan Braun | 8 | OF | November 17, 1983 (aged 29) | (United States) Milwaukee Brewers | Major League Baseball | Los Angeles, California |
| Adam Jones | 10 | OF | August 1, 1985 (aged 27) | (United States) Baltimore Orioles | Major League Baseball | San Diego, California |
| Giancarlo Stanton | 27 | OF | November 8, 1989 (aged 23) | (United States) Miami Marlins | Major League Baseball | Panorama City, California |
| Shane Victorino | 50 | OF | November 30, 1980 (aged 32) | (United States) Boston Red Sox | Major League Baseball | Wailuku, Hawaii |

== Notes ==
| Preceded by 2009 | World Baseball Classic rosters | Succeeded by 2017 |
