= Granato =

Granato is a surname. Notable people with the surname include:

- Anthony Granato (born 1981), Italian–Canadian baseball player
- Cammi Granato (born 1971), American ice hockey player
- Don Granato (born 1967), American ice hockey player
- Luciana Granato (born 1977), Brazilian rower
- Nick Granato (born 1963), American folk singer-songwriter
- Tony Granato (born 1964), American ice hockey player

== See also ==
- Granatto, similar surname
