= Merchán =

Merchán is a surname. Notable people with the surname include:

- Chucho Merchán (born 1952), Colombian bassist and guitarist
- Emilio Merchán (born 1976), Spanish sprint and marathon canoeist
- Jesús Merchán (born 1981), Venezuelan baseball player
- José María Merchán (born 1976), Spanish triathlete
- Juan Merchan (born 1962 or 1963), American jurist, New York State Supreme Court
- Robinson Merchán (born 1964), Venezuelan road racing cyclist
- Sebastián Merchán (born 1987), Ecuadorian racing driver
