= Henan Elephants =

Henan Elephants may refer to the following Chinese professional sports teams based in Henan province:

- Henan Roaring Elephants, a men's basketball team in the National Basketball League (NBL)
- Henan Phoenix, a women's basketball team in the Women's Chinese Basketball Association (WCBA), formerly known as Henan Elephants
- Henan Elephants (baseball), a baseball team in the now defunct China Baseball League (CBL)

== See also ==
- Henan Television, nicknamed the Elephant Channel (大象台) in China
- Elephants in ancient China, which mentions the history of elephants in Henan
