= Alfredo Amézaga =

Mexican baseball player (born 1978)

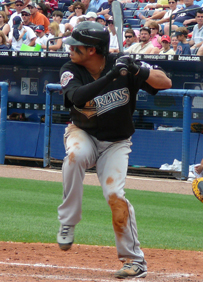
- Amézaga, with the Marlins in June 2007

Diablos Rojos del México
- Center fielder / Infielder / Coach
- Born: January 16, 1978 (age 48); Ciudad Obregón, Sonora, Mexico
- Batted: Switch Threw: Right

MLB debut
- May 24, 2002, for the Anaheim Angels

Last MLB appearance
- September 4, 2011, for the Florida Marlins

MLB statistics
- Batting average: .247
- Home runs: 12
- Runs batted in: 110
- Stats at Baseball Reference

Teams
- As player: Anaheim Angels (2002–2004); Colorado Rockies (2005); Pittsburgh Pirates (2005); Florida Marlins (2006–2009); Colorado Rockies (2011); Florida Marlins (2011); As coach: Detroit Tigers (2023)

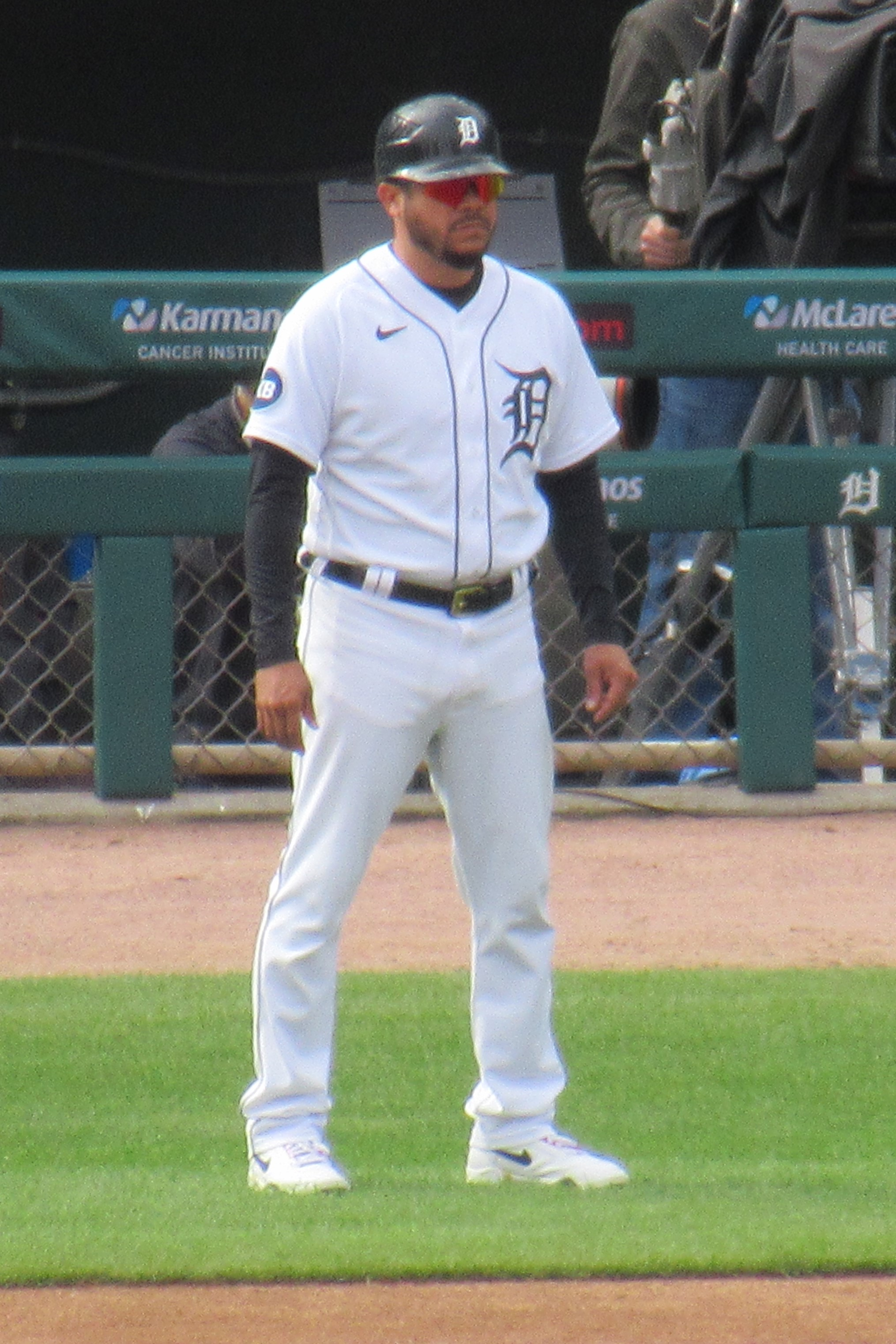
Coaching first base for the Detroit Tigers in September 2022

Alfredo Amézaga Delgado (/əˈmɛzəɡə/; Spanish pronunciation: [alˈfɾeðo aˈmesaɣa]; born January 16, 1978) is a Mexican former professional baseball center fielder and infielder. He played in Major League Baseball (MLB) from 2004 to 2011 for the Anaheim Angels, Colorado Rockies, Pittsburgh Pirates, and Florida Marlins. He is currently a coach for the Diablos Rojos del México of the Mexican League, and has previously coached for the Detroit Tigers.

During his career, Amézaga played 265 games in the outfield (most of them in center field), 115 games at shortstop, 71 games at third base, 60 games at second base and 6 games at first base. The only positions he did not play were pitcher and catcher.

Amézaga graduated from Miami High School and St. Petersburg College. While in college, he played for the Keene Swamp Bats of the New England Collegiate Baseball League. He played for Yaquis de Obregón and Tomateros de Culiacán in the Mexican Pacific League between MLB seasons for several years and appeared for the Mexican team in both the 2006 World Baseball Classic and 2009 World Baseball Classic.

== Professional career ==
=== Anaheim Angels ===
He was drafted one spot ahead of Albert Pujols at 401st overall in the 1999 Draft by the Anaheim Angels. In his first professional season with the Class-A Boise Hawks he hit .322 and was named to the Northwest League All-Star team. In 2000 with the Lake Elsinore Storm he hit .279, was an honorable mention selection to the California League All-star team and was second in the league with 73 stolen bases. In 2001 with the Double-A Arkansas Travelers he hit .312 in 70 games and was named to both the mid-season and postseason Texas League All-Star teams. He also was a member of the "World Team" at the All-Star Futures Game and was named the Angels Minor League Defensive Player of the Year. In 2003, he was named to the Pacific Coast League All-Star team, while leading all Angels minor leaguers with a .347 average for the AAA Salt Lake Stingers.

Amézaga made his Major League debut on May 24, 2002, against the Minnesota Twins as a shortstop. He was hitless in three at-bats that day. He recorded his first Major League hit two days later, a double to left center against Twins pitcher Eric Milton. His first home run did not come until August 19, 2003, against Jon Garland of the Chicago White Sox. In three seasons with the Angels, he played in 122 games and hit .209. He also appeared in two games for the Angels in the 2004 American League Division Series against the Boston Red Sox, and was hitless in two at-bats.

=== Colorado Rockies ===
Amézaga was designated for assignment by the Angels after the 2004 season and selected off waivers by the Colorado Rockies. He made the opening day roster with the Rockies, his first such achievement in the big leagues. He only appeared in two games for the Rockies and was one for three before the Rockies designated him for assignment on April 20.

=== Pittsburgh Pirates ===
He was claimed off waivers by the Pittsburgh Pirates and was 0 for 3 in three appearances with the Pirates. He spent the remainder of the season in AAA with the Indianapolis Indians, where he hit .341 in 64 games.

=== Florida Marlins ===
He signed as a free agent with the Florida Marlins prior to the 2006 season and appeared in a career high 132 games, hitting .260. He appeared in 417 games with the Marlins over four years, hitting .259 during that span. However, he underwent microfracture surgery on his left knee in July, 2009 and missed the rest of the season while recovering. The Marlins chose to release him after the season.

=== Los Angeles Dodgers ===
He was signed to a minor league contract by the Los Angeles Dodgers on February 2, 2010. Still recovering from his injury, he did not play in any spring training games. Amézaga made his season debut on May 17 for the Double-A Chattanooga Lookouts. He only had four at-bats before returning to the disabled list for the remainder of the season, after which he became a free agent.

=== Return to Colorado ===
Amezaga signed a minor league contract with an invitation to Spring training with the Colorado Rockies on January 26, 2011, but failed to make the team and was sent down to Triple-A Colorado Springs. He had his contract purchased on April 29. He was designated for assignment on May 29.

=== Return to Florida ===
On August 6, 2011, Amézaga was re-acquired by the Florida Marlins from the Rockies in exchange for minor league shortstop Jesús Merchán. He played 20 games for the Fish, batting .136 in 49 plate appearances.

=== Chicago Cubs ===
He signed as a minor league free agent with the Chicago Cubs on January 13, 2012. He spent the season in AAA with the Iowa Cubs and hit .274 in 113 games.

=== Los Angeles Dodgers ===
He signed a minor league contract with the Dodgers on January 5, 2013, and was assigned to the AAA Albuquerque Isotopes. After hitting .339 in 37 games for the Isotopes, he was released on June 2.

=== Tigres de Quintana Roo ===
On June 5, 2013, Amézaga signed with the Tigres de Quintana Roo of the Mexican Baseball League.

=== Toros de Tijuana ===
On April 10, 2017, Amézaga signed with the Toros de Tijuana of the Mexican Baseball League. He was released on February 27, 2018. Amézaga announced his retirement as an active player (in both the Mexican Pacific League and the Mexican Baseball League) following his participation in the 2018 Caribbean Series.

== Coaching career ==
=== Atlanta Braves ===
Amézaga was named as a coach for the Double-A Mississippi Braves in the Atlanta Braves organization for the 2019 season.

=== Detroit Tigers ===
On December 5, 2022, the Detroit Tigers announced Amézaga as their first base coach for the 2023 season.

=== Saraperos de Saltillo ===
On November 24, 2023, Amézaga was named manager of the Saraperos de Saltillo of the Mexican League for the 2024 season. On June 3, 2024, Amézaga was fired as the manager of Saltillo.

=== Tomateros de Culiacán ===
Amézaga was announced as the new manager of the Tomateros de Culiacán in a press conference held by the organization on April 20, 2023. Amézaga expressed his excitement to work on the team's renewal and his goal to lead the Tomateros to victory in his role as skipper. Furthermore, his previous experience as a coach with the Naranjeros de Hermosillo was highlighted. Amézaga's addition as manager represents a significant step in the history of the Culiacán Tomateros.

=== Diablos Rojos del México ===
On June 7, 2024, Amézaga was hired to serve as the baserunning coach and defensive coordinator for the Diablos Rojos del México of the Mexican League.
