= 2012 European Baseball Championship =

Tournament details
- Country: Netherlands
- Dates: 7 – 16 September 2012
- Teams: 12
- Defending champions: Italy

Final positions
- Champions: Italy (10th title)
- Runners-up: Netherlands
- Third place: Spain
- Fourth place: Germany

Tournament statistics
- Games played: 43
- Attendance: 26,200 (609 per game)

The 2012 European Baseball Championship was an international baseball tournament held from 7–16 September 2012. The Confederation of European Baseball selected the Netherlands to host the tournament, with games played in Rotterdam, Haarlem, and Utrecht.

Italy went undefeated and repeated as European champions. Lorenzo Avagnina was named the most valuable player of the tournament, and Luca Panerati was the top pitcher in the tournament. The Italian team featured future Major League Baseball (MLB) player Chris Collabello and hitting coach Mike Piazza, who was later inducted into the Baseball Hall of Fame. The Netherlands, who had former MLB players Shairon Martis and Yurendell DeCaster, again finished second.

Two former MLB players managed other squads. Jim Essian managed Greece, and Dennis Cook managed Sweden.

== Qualification ==
Twelve teams competed in the tournament. The top seven teams from the 2010 European championship qualified automatically, and five teams won qualification tournaments.

| Pool A | | Pool B | |
|---|---|---|---|
| Croatia | Winner of Zagreb pool | Belgium | Winner of Antwerp pool |
| Greece | 4th, 2010 European Baseball Championship | Czech Republic | 7th, 2010 European Baseball Championship |
| Italy | 2010 European Baseball Championship | France | 6th, 2010 European Baseball Championship |
| Russia | Winner of Krymsk pool | Germany | 2010 European Baseball Championship |
| Spain | Winner of Barcelona pool | Great Britain | Winner of Tel Aviv pool |
| Sweden | 5th, 2010 European Baseball Championship | Netherlands | 2010 European Baseball Championship |

== Round 1 ==
The six teams in both pools played a round-robin tournament. The top three teams from each group qualified for the championship pool, Pool C. The fourth, fifth, and sixth place finishers in each group played one game against the team that finished in the same place in the other group to determine the seventh through twelfth place rankings.

=== Pool A ===
==== Standings ====
| Qualified for Pool C |
| Did not qualify for Pool C |

| Teams | W | L | Pct. | GB | R | RA |
|---|---|---|---|---|---|---|
| Italy | 5 | 0 | 1.000 | – | 45 | 4 |
| Spain | 4 | 1 | .800 | 1 | 42 | 6 |
| Sweden | 3 | 2 | .600 | 2 | 25 | 27 |
| Greece | 2 | 3 | .400 | 3 | 19 | 29 |
| Croatia | 1 | 4 | .200 | 4 | 12 | 37 |
| Russia | 0 | 5 | .000 | 5 | 11 | 51 |

==== Schedule ====
| September 7, 2012 | Spain | 10 – 0 (F/8) | Greece | Pim Mulier Baseball Stadium, Haarlem; Attendance: 235 |
| September 7, 2012 | | Boxscore | | Pim Mulier Baseball Stadium, Haarlem; Attendance: 235 |

| September 7, 2012 | Sweden | 14 – 1 (F/7) | Russia | Vleuten Sportpark, Utrecht; Attendance: 70 |
| September 7, 2012 | | Boxscore | | Vleuten Sportpark, Utrecht; Attendance: 70 |

| September 7, 2012 | Croatia | 0 – 16 (F/5) | Italy | Pim Mulier Baseball Stadium, Haarlem; Attendance: 175 |
| September 7, 2012 | | Boxscore | | Pim Mulier Baseball Stadium, Haarlem; Attendance: 175 |

| September 8, 2012 | Russia | 1 – 10 | Spain | Pim Mulier Baseball Stadium, Haarlem; Attendance: 80 |
| September 8, 2012 | | Boxscore | | Pim Mulier Baseball Stadium, Haarlem; Attendance: 80 |

| September 8, 2012 | Greece | 7 – 2 | Croatia | Neptunus Family Stadium, Rotterdam; Attendance: 360 |
| September 8, 2012 | | Boxscore | | Neptunus Family Stadium, Rotterdam; Attendance: 360 |

| September 8, 2012 | Italy | 8 – 1 | Sweden | Pim Mulier Baseball Stadium, Haarlem; Attendance: 250 |
| September 8, 2012 | | Boxscore | | Pim Mulier Baseball Stadium, Haarlem; Attendance: 250 |

| September 9, 2012 | Sweden | 4 – 2 | Croatia | Pim Mulier Baseball Stadium, Haarlem; Attendance: 125 |
| September 9, 2012 | | Boxscore | | Pim Mulier Baseball Stadium, Haarlem; Attendance: 125 |

| September 9, 2012 | Italy | 4 – 3 | Spain | Pim Mulier Baseball Stadium, Haarlem; Attendance: 165 |
| September 9, 2012 | | Boxscore | | Pim Mulier Baseball Stadium, Haarlem; Attendance: 165 |

| September 9, 2012 | Greece | 9 – 5 | Russia | Vleuten Sportpark, Utrecht; Attendance: 40 |
| September 9, 2012 | | Boxscore | | Vleuten Sportpark, Utrecht; Attendance: 40 |

| September 10, 2012 | Croatia | 8 – 4 | Russia | Vleuten Sportpark, Utrecht; Attendance: 55 |
| September 10, 2012 | | Boxscore | | Vleuten Sportpark, Utrecht; Attendance: 55 |

| September 10, 2012 | Sweden | 1 – 13 (F/7) | Spain | Neptunus Family Stadium, Rotterdam; Attendance: 200 |
| September 10, 2012 | | Boxscore | | Neptunus Family Stadium, Rotterdam; Attendance: 200 |

| September 10, 2012 | Italy | 7 – 0 | Greece | Pim Mulier Baseball Stadium, Haarlem; Attendance: 80 |
| September 10, 2012 | | Boxscore | | Pim Mulier Baseball Stadium, Haarlem; Attendance: 80 |

| September 11, 2012 | Spain | 6 – 0 | Croatia | Vleuten Sportpark, Utrecht; Attendance: 36 |
| September 11, 2012 | | Boxscore | | Vleuten Sportpark, Utrecht; Attendance: 36 |

| September 11, 2012 | Greece | 3 – 5 | Sweden | Pim Mulier Baseball Stadium, Haarlem; Attendance: 270 |
| September 11, 2012 | | Boxscore | | Pim Mulier Baseball Stadium, Haarlem; Attendance: 270 |

| September 11, 2012 | Russia | 0 – 10 (F/7) | Italy | Pim Mulier Baseball Stadium, Haarlem; Attendance: 75 |
| September 11, 2012 | | Boxscore | | Pim Mulier Baseball Stadium, Haarlem; Attendance: 75 |

=== Pool B ===
The Czech Republic defeated the Netherlands, 3–2 in 10 innings, the team's first ever win over the Dutch.

==== Standings ====
| Qualified for Pool C |
| Did not qualify for Pool C |

| Teams | W | L | Pct. | GB | R | RA |
|---|---|---|---|---|---|---|
| Netherlands | 4 | 1 | .800 | – | 55 | 5 |
| Germany | 4 | 1 | .800 | – | 29 | 20 |
| Czech Republic | 3 | 2 | .600 | 1 | 26 | 16 |
| France | 2 | 3 | .400 | 2 | 15 | 38 |
| Belgium | 1 | 4 | .200 | 3 | 23 | 55 |
| Great Britain | 1 | 4 | .200 | 3 | 17 | 31 |

==== Schedule ====
| September 7, 2012 | Czech Republic | 4 – 5 (F/10) | Germany | Neptunus Family Stadium, Rotterdam; Attendance: 370 |
| September 7, 2012 | | Boxscore | | Neptunus Family Stadium, Rotterdam; Attendance: 370 |

| September 7, 2012 | France | 3 – 1 | Great Britain | Vleuten Sportpark, Utrecht; Attendance: 80 |
| September 7, 2012 | | Boxscore | | Vleuten Sportpark, Utrecht; Attendance: 80 |

| September 7, 2012 | Belgium | 0 – 17 (F/6) | Netherlands | Neptunus Family Stadium, Rotterdam; Attendance: 2,000 |
| September 7, 2012 | | Boxscore | | Neptunus Family Stadium, Rotterdam; Attendance: 2,000 |

| September 8, 2012 | Germany | 10 – 2 | Belgium | Vleuten Sportpark, Utrecht; Attendance: 535 |
| September 8, 2012 | | Boxscore | | Vleuten Sportpark, Utrecht; Attendance: 535 |

| September 8, 2012 | Netherlands | 15 – 0 (F/5) | France | Neptunus Family Stadium, Rotterdam; Attendance: 2,115 |
| September 8, 2012 | | Boxscore | | Neptunus Family Stadium, Rotterdam; Attendance: 2,115 |

| September 8, 2012 | Great Britain | 6 – 1 | Czech Republic | Vleuten Sportpark, Utrecht; Attendance: 259 |
| September 8, 2012 | | Boxscore | | Vleuten Sportpark, Utrecht; Attendance: 259 |

| September 9, 2012 | Netherlands | 2 – 3 (F/10) | Czech Republic | Neptunus Family Stadium, Rotterdam; Attendance: 2,400 |
| September 9, 2012 | | Boxscore | | Neptunus Family Stadium, Rotterdam; Attendance: 2,400 |

| September 9, 2012 | France | 9 – 8 | Belgium | Vleuten Sportpark, Utrecht; Attendance: 125 |
| September 9, 2012 | | Boxscore | | Vleuten Sportpark, Utrecht; Attendance: 125 |

| September 9, 2012 | Germany | 6 – 1 | Great Britain | Neptunus Family Stadium, Rotterdam; Attendance: 350 |
| September 9, 2012 | | Boxscore | | Neptunus Family Stadium, Rotterdam; Attendance: 350 |

| September 10, 2012 | France | 0 – 6 | Czech Republic | Pim Mulier Baseball Stadium, Haarlem; Attendance: 175 |
| September 10, 2012 | | Boxscore | | Pim Mulier Baseball Stadium, Haarlem; Attendance: 175 |

| September 10, 2012 | Belgium | 10 – 7 | Great Britain | Vleuten Sportpark, Utrecht; Attendance: 270 |
| September 10, 2012 | | Boxscore | | Vleuten Sportpark, Utrecht; Attendance: 270 |

| September 10, 2012 | Netherlands | 10 – 0 (F/7) | Germany | Neptunus Family Stadium, Rotterdam; Attendance: 2200 |
| September 10, 2012 | | Boxscore | | Neptunus Family Stadium, Rotterdam; Attendance: 2200 |

| September 11, 2012 | Germany | 8 – 3 | France | Neptunus Family Stadium, Rotterdam; Attendance: 175 |
| September 11, 2012 | | Boxscore | | Neptunus Family Stadium, Rotterdam; Attendance: 175 |

| September 11, 2012 | Czech Republic | 12 – 3 | Belgium | Vleuten Sportpark, Utrecht; Attendance: 125 |
| September 11, 2012 | | Boxscore | | Vleuten Sportpark, Utrecht; Attendance: 125 |

| September 11, 2012 | Great Britain | 2 – 11 | Netherlands | Neptunus Family Stadium, Rotterdam; Attendance: 2,000 |
| September 11, 2012 | | Boxscore | | Neptunus Family Stadium, Rotterdam; Attendance: 2,000 |

== Classification games ==
=== 11th place game ===
| September 12, 2012 | Russia | 2 – 6 | Great Britain | Neptunus Family Stadium, Rotterdam; Attendance: 115 |
| September 12, 2012 | | Boxscore | | Neptunus Family Stadium, Rotterdam; Attendance: 115 |

=== 9th place game ===
| September 12, 2012 | Belgium | 3 – 2 | Croatia | Pim Mulier Baseball Stadium, Haarlem; Attendance: 175 |
| September 12, 2012 | | Boxscore | | Pim Mulier Baseball Stadium, Haarlem; Attendance: 175 |

=== 7th place game ===
| September 12, 2012 | France | 5 – 9 | Greece | Vleuten Sportpark, Utrecht; Attendance: 65 |
| September 12, 2012 | | Boxscore | | Vleuten Sportpark, Utrecht; Attendance: 65 |

== Round 2 ==
=== Pool C ===
Spain secured a third-place finish in the tournament by defeating Germany in their final game.

Italy defeated the Netherlands in their pool game, ensuring it would be the home team for the championship game in Rotterdam.

==== Standings ====
| Teams | W | L | Pct. | GB | R | RA |
|---|---|---|---|---|---|---|
| Italy | 5 | 0 | 1.000 | – | 22 | 7 |
| Netherlands | 3 | 2 | .600 | 2 | 34 | 8 |
| Spain | 3 | 2 | .600 | 2 | 30 | 18 |
| Germany | 2 | 3 | .400 | 3 | 21 | 28 |
| Czech Republic | 2 | 3 | .400 | 3 | 18 | 21 |
| Sweden | 0 | 5 | .000 | 5 | 11 | 54 |

==== Schedule ====
| September 13, 2012 | Spain | 6 – 5 | Czech Republic | Pim Mulier Baseball Stadium, Haarlem; Attendance: 580 |
| September 13, 2012 | | Boxscore | | Pim Mulier Baseball Stadium, Haarlem; Attendance: 580 |

| September 13, 2012 | Italy | 3 – 0 | Germany | Pim Mulier Baseball Stadium, Haarlem; Attendance: 195 |
| September 13, 2012 | | Boxscore | | Pim Mulier Baseball Stadium, Haarlem; Attendance: 195 |

| September 13, 2012 | Sweden | 1 – 17 (F/6) | Netherlands | Neptunus Family Stadium, Rotterdam; Attendance: 2,200 |
| September 13, 2012 | | Boxscore | | Neptunus Family Stadium, Rotterdam; Attendance: 2,200 |

| September 14, 2012 | Germany | 10 – 3 | Sweden | Neptunus Family Stadium, Rotterdam; Attendance: 125 |
| September 14, 2012 | | Boxscore | | Neptunus Family Stadium, Rotterdam; Attendance: 125 |

| September 14, 2012 | Netherlands | 2 – 0 | Spain | Neptunus Family Stadium, Rotterdam; Attendance: 1,415 |
| September 14, 2012 | | Boxscore | | Neptunus Family Stadium, Rotterdam; Attendance: 1,415 |

| September 14, 2012 | Czech Republic | 0 – 3 | Italy | Pim Mulier Baseball Stadium, Haarlem; Attendance: 100 |
| September 14, 2012 | | Boxscore | | Pim Mulier Baseball Stadium, Haarlem; Attendance: 100 |

| September 15, 2012 | Czech Republic | 6 – 5 | Sweden | Pim Mulier Baseball Stadium, Haarlem; Attendance: 175 |
| September 15, 2012 | | Boxscore | | Pim Mulier Baseball Stadium, Haarlem; Attendance: 175 |

| September 15, 2012 | Germany | 6 – 8 | Spain | Pim Mulier Baseball Stadium, Haarlem; Attendance: 175 |
| September 15, 2012 | | Boxscore | | Pim Mulier Baseball Stadium, Haarlem; Attendance: 175 |

| September 15, 2012 | Italy | 4 – 3 | Netherlands | Neptunus Family Stadium, Rotterdam; Attendance: 1,485 |
| September 15, 2012 | | Boxscore | | Neptunus Family Stadium, Rotterdam; Attendance: 1,485 |

== Championship game ==
Italy defeated the Netherlands in the championship game, with Lorenzo Avagnina batting 4-for-5. Italian starter John Mariotti limited the Dutch offense, thought Quintin de Cuba hit a home run in a losing effort.

| September 16, 2012 | Italy | 8 – 3 | Netherlands | Neptunus Family Stadium, Rotterdam; Attendance: 4,000 |
| September 16, 2012 | | Boxscore | | Neptunus Family Stadium, Rotterdam; Attendance: 4,000 |
| September 16, 2012 | | Boxscore | HR: Quintin de Cuba | Neptunus Family Stadium, Rotterdam; Attendance: 4,000 |

== Final standings ==
| Rk | Team | W | L |
|---|---|---|---|
| 1st place, gold medalist(s) | Italy | 9 | 0 |
Lost in Gold medal game
| 2nd place, silver medalist(s) | Netherlands | 6 | 3 |
Failed to qualify for Gold medal game
| 3rd place, bronze medalist(s) | Spain | 4 | 4 |
| 4 | Germany | 4 | 4 |
| 5 | Czech Republic | 4 | 4 |
| 6 | Sweden | 3 | 5 |
Failed to qualify for Round 2
| 7 | Greece | 3 | 3 |
| 8 | France | 2 | 4 |
Failed to qualify for the 7th place game
| 9 | Belgium | 2 | 4 |
| 10 | Croatia | 1 | 5 |
Failed to qualify for the 9th place game
| 11 | Great Britain | 2 | 4 |
| 12 | Russia | 0 | 6 |

2012 European Baseball Championship

Italy
10th title

== Awards and leaders ==
- Most valuable player: (Italy) Lorenzo Avagnina
- Outstanding defensive player: (Netherlands) Nick Urbanus
- Best pitcher (win–loss record and earned run average): (Italy) Luca Panerati, 2–0 and 0.00 in 13 innings pitched
- Best batting average: (Spain) Paco Figueroa, .600
- Most runs batted in: (Spain) Dewis Navarro
- Most runs scored: (Spain) Figueroa, 6
- Most stolen bases: (Netherlands) Kalian Sams, 2
- Hit for the cycle: (Netherlands) Sams, against Belgium
