= Granatto =

Granatto is a surname. Notable people with the surname include:

- María José Granatto (born 1995), Argentine field hockey player
- Victoria Granatto (born 1991), Argentine field hockey player

== See also ==
- Granato, similar surname
