= Stefano Desimoni =

Italian baseball player

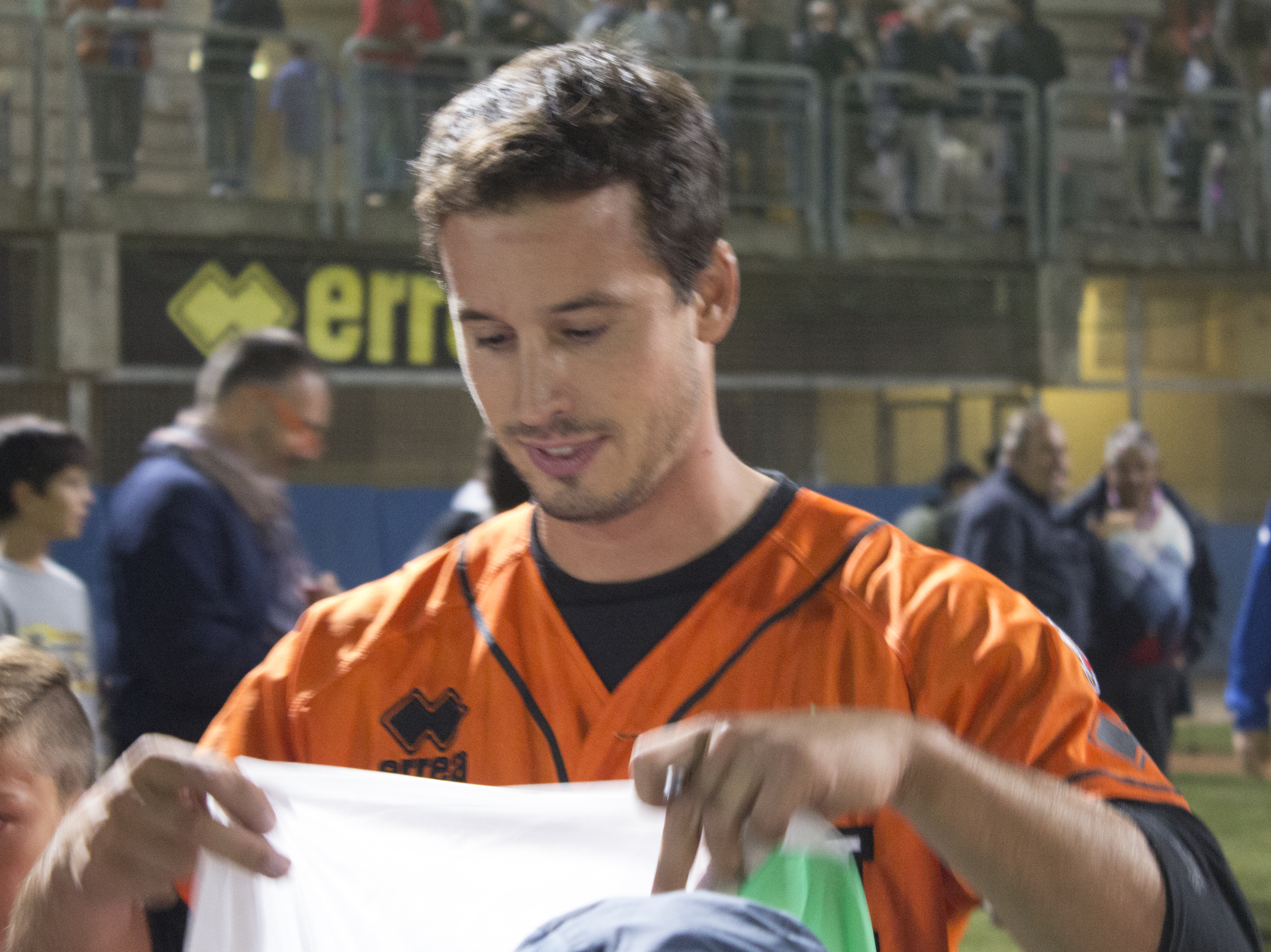

Parma Baseball – No. 48
- Outfielder
- Born: 12 April 1988 (age 37); Parma, Emilia-Romagna, Italy
- Bats: Left Throws: Left
- Stats at Baseball Reference
Medals
Men's baseball
Representing Italy
European Baseball Championship
| Gold medal – first place | 2010 Germany | National team |
| Bronze medal – third place | 2016 Hoofddorp | National team |

Stefano Desimoni (born 12 April 1988) is an Italian professional baseball outfielder, for Parma Baseball in the Italian Baseball League.

He also played for the Italy national baseball team in the 2010 European Baseball Championship, 2012 European Baseball Championship and 2013 World Baseball Classic.
