= Diego Franca =

Brazilian baseball player

Kazusa Magic
- Catcher
- Born: April 6, 1987 (age 38); Maringá, Paraná, Brazil
- Bats: Right Throws: Right

Diego Henrique França (born April 6, 1987) is a Brazilian baseball catcher, who is with the Kazusa Magic in the Japanese Amateur Baseball Association. He attended Tokyo Fuji University and represented Brazil at the 2013 World Baseball Classic. He is of Japanese descent on his mother's side.
