= Tim Crabbe =

American baseball player

- Pitcher
- Born: February 20, 1988 (age 38); Tucson, Arizona, U.S.
- Bats: Right Throws: Right
- Stats at Baseball Reference

Timothy Davis Crabbe (born February 20, 1988) is an Italian-American former professional baseball pitcher.

He was drafted by the Reds in the 14th round of the 2009 MLB draft out of Westmont College. The Reds invited Crabbe to spring training as a non-roster invitee in 2014.

He was on the roster for the Italy national baseball team at the 2013 World Baseball Classic.
