= Luca Panerati =

Italian baseball player (born 1989)

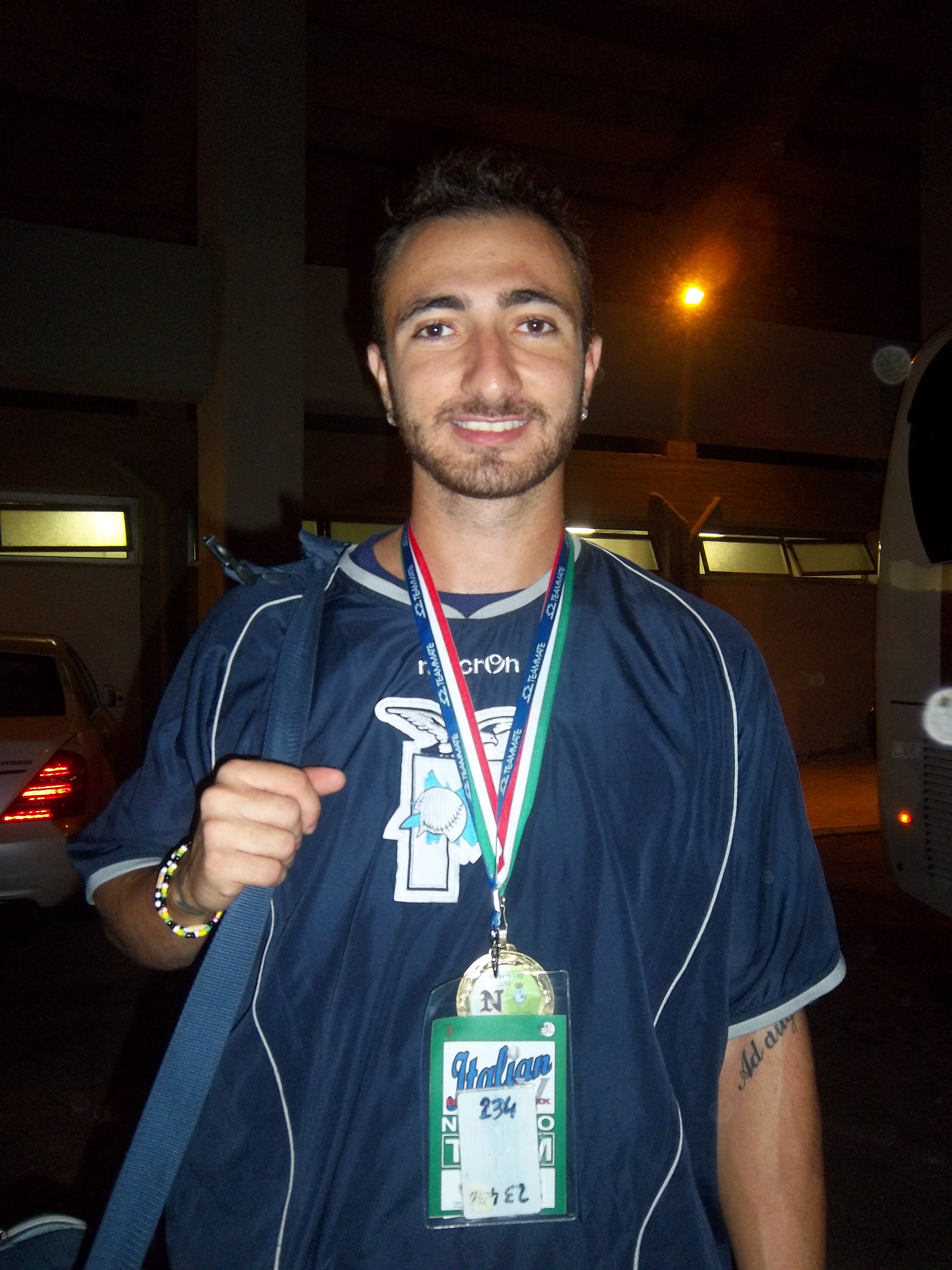

Fortitudo Baseball Bologna
- Pitcher
- Born: 2 December 1989 (age 36); Grosseto, Tuscany, Italy
- Bats: Left Throws: Left
- Stats at Baseball Reference
Medals
Men's baseball
Representing Italy
European Baseball Championship
| Bronze medal – third place | 2016 Hoofddorp | National team |

Luca Panerati (born 2 December 1989 in Grosseto, Tuscany, Italy) is an Italian professional baseball pitcher. He debuted with the Italian national baseball team in 2007 and in minor league baseball in 2008.

== Career ==
Panerati made his Serie A1 debut in 2006, allowing no runs in two innings for Bbc Grosseto. He played for Italy in the 2006 World Junior Championship. In 2007, he spent all year in Serie A2, going 3–2 with a 1.58 ERA and 52 strikeouts in 51 1/3 IP for Rosemar, the second team of the city of Grosseto. In the European Junior Championship, he was 2–0 with 10 1/3 scoreless innings of work, allowing only 4 hits and striking out 12. That helped earn him a spot on the senior national team for the 2007 Baseball World Cup. He pitched four scoreless innings, allowing 3 hits and a walk while striking out two and being second on Italy in ERA; Junior Oberto also allowed no earned runs while pitching more innings. He debuted for Italy in a major victory, a 6–2 win over Team USA; it was the first Italian win over America in 21 years and the first time Italy had ever beaten a US team using professional players. More meaningfully, it was the only loss for a US team that won Gold, beating Cuba for the first time ever. Panerati entered the game in the 5th inning, relieving Roberto Corradini with a 6–2 lead. Panerati retired two of three batters with one walk and one strikeout before giving way to Cody Cillo. A day later, the 17-year-old southpaw threw 2 1/3 innings of one-hit ball, striking out against Panama in a 6–0 loss. He pitched one inning against the Mexico national team, allowing two hits.

Panerati signed with the Cincinnati Reds for 2008, going to minor league spring training, returning to Italy to finish high school, then beginning his professional career. In the 2008 European Cup, he went six scoreless innings for a win for the host Bbc Grosseto over the Mainz Athletics.

Panerati made his minor league debut on 26 July with a scoreless inning of relief for the GCL Reds against the GCL Twins, retiring all 3 batters he faced. Luca went 1–0 with a 2.84 ERA in 10 games for the GCL Reds that year.

In 2009, Panerati fell to 3–7, 5.96 as a starter for the Billings Mustangs; he walked only 14 in 71 innings but gave up a .302 average. He tied for third in the Pioneer League in losses and tied for 5th in hits allowed (89).

In 2012, he played for Fortitudo Baseball Bologna in the Italian Baseball League. In the regular season, he had 13 starts, with a 7–3 record, 2.57 ERA and .222 opposing batting average. They won the 2012 Final Four and became European Champions. As a member of Italy national baseball team he won the 2012 European Baseball Championship.
