= Nick Granato =

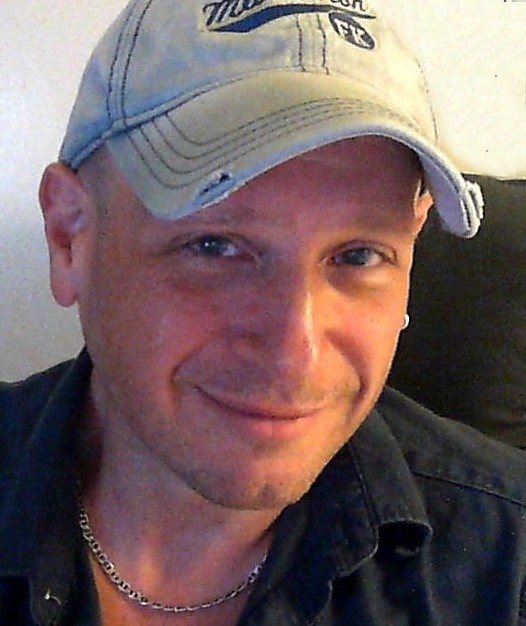
Singer/Songwriter Nick Granato

Nick Granato (born July 18, 1963) is an American Folk Singer/Songwriter, Winner of the Stonewall Society's Pride in The Arts Award(2), 2007 Artist of The Year and 2007 CD of The Year "Outside The Lines". No. 1 CD for 2007 on the Outvoice Charts. Two No. 1 radio singles "My Ordinary Life & "Color Outside The Lines" on Sirius Satellite Radio August 2007/September 2007

== Early career ==
Nick Granato spent his early career mostly as a songwriter in Nashville, he has had nearly 400 songs recorded by numerous artists including Pamala Stanley, Heirline, Juice Newton and Buffalo Rome. Nick's music has been utilized by many organizations including Susan G. Komen for the Cure, The United Way, and the US Olympic Committee.

Nick served as Director of Music Publishing for Chestnut Mound Music/Cal IV Christian (1989–1994) – (1998–2000). and as VP of Gateway Entertainment Inc.(1994-1998), in Nashville as well as a signed songwriter for many different publishing houses through the years.

Nick Granato's first album, Sun Dance was released on the indie Label Song Harbor in 2003. The CD of 12 original Florida Style music contained a duet with Stella Parton and a featured appearance by Nashville Now singer Darlene Austin. The CD received prominent favor at Folk radio, excellent reviews, garnering several award nominations and selling admirably for a first release.

Nick's second album Plastic Pink Flamingos was released on Song Harbor in 2005. The CD contained 13 original Florida Style songs. The title song was seriously considered as a new State song for the State Of Florida. Nick supported and promoted the CD releases by touring American coastal communities. This CD also contains the super popular song Survive.

== Outside The Lines ==
In 2007 Nick Granato released his 3rd CD Outside The Lines on Song Harbor. 13 Tracks of original Folk/Rock style songs, infused with political and social commentary. The CD featured prominent Nashville Studio musicians, Gene Rabbai, Steve Cummings, Donny Skaggs Phil Lister and Doug Kahan. Outside The Lines produced 6 No. 1 songs and earned Nick 5 Pride In The Arts Award Nominations, winning the top award, Artist Of The Year and CD Of The Year. In 2007–2008 Nick toured the United States, Canada, Mexico and Hawaii.

== Discography ==
2009 "In Real Life" – Song Harbor
2007 Outside The Lines – Song Harbor
2005 Plastic Pink Flamingos – Song Harbor
2003 Sun Dance – Song Harbor
1988 Up Against The Wall - Spiritwind

== Future ==
A new CD In Real Life was released in October 2009. In late December 2009, Nick collapsed on stage during a performance in Miami's South Beach. Nick was diagnosed with a painful neuro-muscular disorder. Unable to play his guitar or perform live, Nick was forced to cancel his scheduled national tour to promote his new "In Real Life" CD, and take time to consult with his Doctors and rehabilitate. To date, Doctors have still been unable to make a conclusive diagnosis and Nick has not been able to resume performing. Nick continues to write songs and represent other song catalogs. In 2013 he started up a PR/Media/Radio Production company called Cosmic Slug Creative Universe.
