= Lorenzo Avagnina =

Italian baseball player (born 1980)

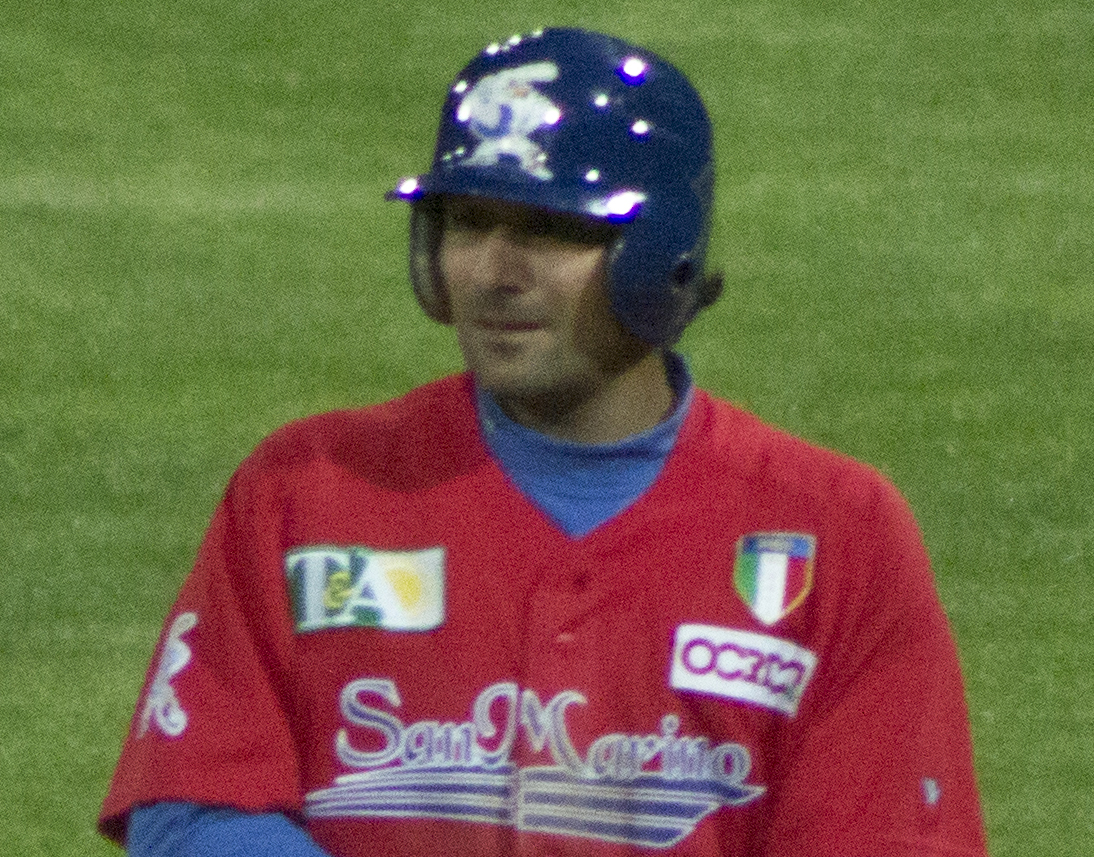

San Marino Baseball Club
- Outfielder
- Born: 14 November 1980 (age 45); Fossano, Cuneo, Italy
- Bats: Left Throws: Left
- Stats at Baseball Reference
Medals
Men's baseball
Representing Italy
European Baseball Championship
Gold medal – first place	2010 Germany	National team

Lorenzo Avagnina (born 14 November 1980) is an Italian professional baseball outfielder, for San Marino Baseball Club in the Italian Baseball League.

He played for Montepaschi Grosseto and Rimini Baseball Club before joining San Marino in 2011.

He also played for the Italy national baseball team in the 2006 Intercontinental Cup, 2007 European Baseball Championship, 2007 Baseball World Cup, 2008 European Cup, 2010 European Cup, 2010 European Baseball Championship, 2011 Baseball World Cup, 2012 European Baseball Championship and 2013 World Baseball Classic.
