= Yoon Hi-sang =

South Korean baseball player

SK Wyverns – No. 66
- Pitcher
- Born: May 17, 1985 (age 41); Seoul, South Korea
- Bats: Right Throws: Right

KBO statistics (through October 10, 2018)
- Win–loss record: 42–44
- Earned run average: 4.83
- Strikeouts: 550
- Stats at Baseball Reference

Teams
- SK Wyverns (2004–present)

Yoon Hi-Sang (born May 17, 1985) is a South Korean professional baseball player for the SK Wyverns of the Korea Baseball Organization. He represented the South Korea national baseball team at the 2013 World Baseball Classic.
