= José Cruz (baseball, born 1984) =

Spanish baseball player (born 1984)

- Outfielder
- Born: Jose Estebin Cruz Montero; 4 September 1984 (age 41); Santo Domingo, Dominican Republic
- Bats: Both Throws: Right
- Stats at Baseball Reference

Jose Estebin Cruz Montero (born 4 September 1984) is a professional baseball player who plays as an outfielder. Born in the Dominican Republic, he is currently with the Spain national team. He is the brother of Rhiner Cruz.

== Career ==
He played in the Dominican Summer League for the Detroit Tigers in 2006 and 2007 and for the Nettuno Baseball Club in the Italian Baseball League in 2011.

He played for the Spain national baseball team in the 2007 European Baseball Championship, 2007 Baseball World Cup and 2013 World Baseball Classic.
