= John Mariotti =

- Pitcher
- Born: August 19, 1984 (age 41); Conway, South Carolina, U.S.
- Bats: Left Throws: Right
- Stats at Baseball Reference

John Mariotti (born August 19, 1984) is an American former professional baseball pitcher.

He was drafted by the Anaheim Angels in the 44th round of the 2003 MLB draft out of Chaminade College School and in the 36th round of the 2004 MLB draft out of Gulf Coast Community College, but did not sign either time. He was then drafted by the Baltimore Orioles in the 18th round of the 2007 MLB draft from Coastal Carolina University and signed.

Mariotti played for the Orioles farm system through 2010 before he was released. He then signed with the Québec Capitales of the Canadian-American Association.

He was on the roster for the Italy national baseball team at the 2012 European Baseball Championship and 2013 World Baseball Classic.
