= Daniel Figueroa =

American baseball player (born 1983)

- Outfielder
- Born: 19 February 1983 (age 43); Miami, Florida, U.S.
- Bats: Right Throws: Right
- Stats at Baseball Reference

Daniel Figueroa (born 19 February 1983) is an American-born Spanish former professional baseball outfielder. Born in the United States, he represents Spain internationally.

== Early life ==
Figueroa was born in Miami, Florida to a Spanish father and a Cuban mother.

== Career ==
Figueroa played baseball at Gulliver Prep High School and the University of Miami. He was drafted by the Oakland Athletics in the 40th round of the 2004 MLB draft but did not sign and by the Baltimore Orioles in the 43rd round of the 2005 MLB draft. He played in the Orioles farm system through 2010 and spent 2011 in the American Association of Independent Professional Baseball.

== International career ==
Figueroa played for the Spain national baseball team in the 2013 World Baseball Classic.

== Personal life ==
Figueroa's identical twin brother, Paco Figueroa, was his teammate at Miami, both were drafted by the Orioles in 2005 and they played together in the minors and with the Spanish national team.
