= Rhiner Cruz =

Spanish baseball player (born 1986)

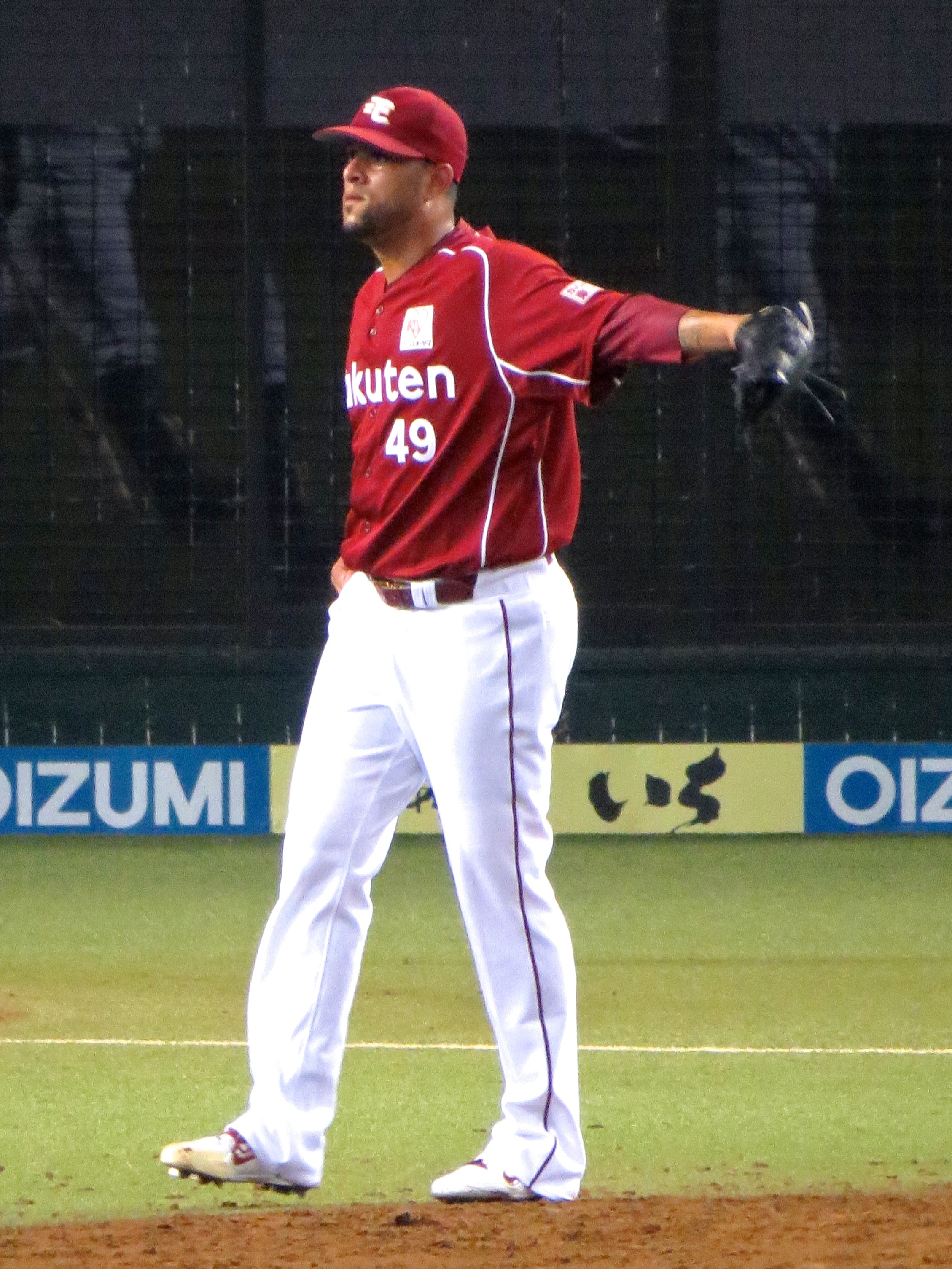
- Cruz with the Tohoku Rakuten Golden Eagles
- Pitcher
- Born: Rhiner Augusto Cruz Montero; 1 November 1986 (age 39); Santo Domingo, Dominican Republic
- Batted: Right Threw: Right

Professional debut
- MLB: 7 April 2012, Houston Astros
- NPB: 11 June 2014, Tohoku Rakuten Golden Eagles

Last appearance
- NPB: August 21, 2015, for the Tohoku Rakuten Golden Eagles
- MLB: July 7, 2018, for the Toronto Blue Jays

MLB statistics
- Win–loss record: 1–3
- Earned run average: 5.20
- Strikeouts: 60

NPB statistics (through 2015 season)
- Win–loss record: 3–5
- Earned run average: 3.45
- Strikeouts: 66
- Stats at Baseball Reference

Teams
- Houston Astros (2012–2013); Tohoku Rakuten Golden Eagles (2014–2015); Toronto Blue Jays (2018)
Medals
Men's baseball
Representing Spain
European Championship
Gold medal – first place	2023 Czechia	Team

Rhiner Augusto Cruz Montero (born 1 November 1986) is a Dominican-Spanish former professional baseball pitcher. He has played in Major League Baseball (MLB) for the Houston Astros and Toronto Blue Jays, and in Nippon Professional Baseball (NPB) for the Tohoku Rakuten Golden Eagles. Born in the Dominican Republic, he plays for the Spain national baseball team at the international level.

== Professional career ==
=== Detroit Tigers ===
Cruz began his career with the Detroit Tigers in 2004. He spent the 2004 and 2005 seasons with the GCL Tigers. He was released after the 2005 season.

=== New York Mets ===
Cruz signed with the New York Mets organization for the 2007 season. In 2007, he played for the DSL Mets, GCL Mets, and Kingsport Mets. In 2008, Cruz played for the Brooklyn Cyclones and Savannah Sand Gnats. For 2009, Cruz played for Savannah the entirety of the season. In 2010, he was assigned to the St. Lucie Mets, where he would spend the entire season. In 2011, he spent time with St. Lucie, and the Binghamton Mets.

=== Houston Astros ===
Cruz was selected by the Astros the first overall selection of the 2011 Rule 5 draft. Cruz was named to the Astros' Opening Day roster. Cruz spent the 2012 season in the majors for the Astros. He also played parts of the 2013 season in the majors as well. On 23 December 2013, Cruz was sent outright to the Oklahoma City RedHawks, and off of the 40-man roster. He began 2016 with the RedHawks before he released on 2 June 2014, to pursue an opportunity in Japan.

=== Tohoku Rakuten Golden Eagles ===
In June 2014, the Astros permitted Cruz to sign with the Tohoku Rakuten Golden Eagles of Nippon Professional Baseball. Cruz would finish the 2014 season with the Eagles. Cruz also played the 2015 season with the Eagles before becoming a free agent at seasons end.

=== Leones de Yucatan ===
On 30 April 2016, Cruz signed with the Leones de Yucatán of the Mexican League. He was released on 15 May 2016. He appeared in 7 games 6 innings of relief with a 0-2 record and a 7.50 era with 7 strikeouts.

=== Vaqueros Laguna ===
On 18 May 2016, Cruz signed with the Vaqueros Laguna, and was released on 22 May. In 1 game 1 inning of relief he gave up 2 earned runs and had 2 strikeouts.

=== Atlanta Braves ===
On 13 December 2016, Cruz signed a minor league deal with the Atlanta Braves organization. He spent the year 2017 with the Triple–A Gwinnett Braves, making 40 appearances and recorded a 2.84 ERA with 63 strikeouts and 5 saves in 50 2/3 innings of work. He elected free agency following the season on 6 November 2017.

=== Toronto Blue Jays ===
Cruz signed a minor league contract with the Toronto Blue Jays on 25 January 2018, and received an invitation to spring training. On 4 July 2018, Cruz had his contract selected and was added to the active roster. He pitched two shutout innings in relief that night against the New York Mets. He was placed on the disabled list with a groin injury a few days later and would not return that season. On 2 November 2018, Cruz cleared waivers and entered free agency.

=== Nettuno Baseball Club ===
On 8 July 2021, Cruz signed with the Nettuno Baseball Club of the Italian Baseball League (IBL). Cruz made 4 appearances for Nettuno, tallying 15 strikeouts and 1 save across 6.0 scoreless innings.

=== Piratas de Campeche ===
On 23 June 2022, Cruz was signed by the Piratas de Campeche of the Mexican League. In 13 relief appearances for Campeche, he struggled to an 8.10 ERA with 9 strikeouts across 13 1/3 innings pitched. Cruz was released on 28 March 2023.

== International career ==
Cruz played for the Spanish national baseball team at the 2009 Baseball World Cup and the 2013 World Baseball Classic.

In 2022, Cruz was selected to represent Spain at the 2023 World Baseball Classic qualification.

== Personal life ==
He held dual Dominican Republic and Spanish citizenship.

Cruz' brother, José, also plays for the Spanish national team.
