= Paco Figueroa =

American baseball coach (born 1983)

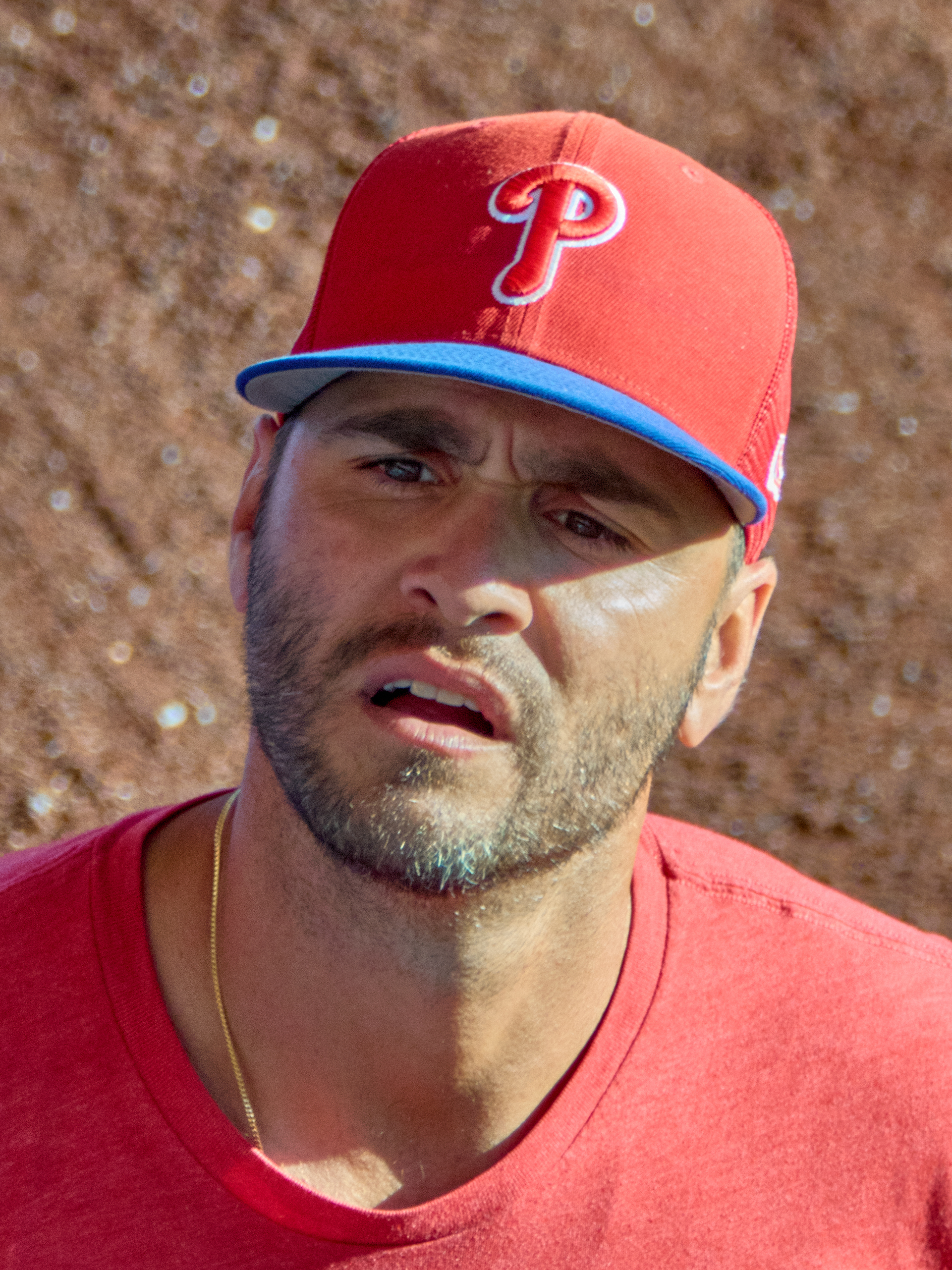
- Figueroa with the Phillies in 2022

Philadelphia Phillies – No. 38
- Second baseman / Coach
- Born: Francisco Figueroa; February 19, 1983 (age 43); Miami, Florida, U.S.
- Bats: Right Throws: Right
- Stats at Baseball Reference

Teams
- As coach: Philadelphia Phillies (2019–present)

Francisco "Paco" Figueroa (born 19 February 1983) is an American-born Spanish baseball coach and former professional baseball second baseman. Born in the United States, he represented Spain internationally. He is the first base, outfield, and base running coach for the Philadelphia Phillies of Major League Baseball (MLB).

== Baseball career ==
Figueroa was born in Miami, Florida to a Spanish father and a Cuban mother. He played baseball at Gulliver Prep High School and was drafted by the Atlanta Braves in the 42nd round of the 2001 MLB draft but did not sign, opting instead to attend the University of Miami. In 2003, he played collegiate summer baseball with the Brewster Whitecaps of the Cape Cod Baseball League, and returned to the league in 2004 to play for the Bourne Braves. He was drafted again, this time by the Baltimore Orioles in the 9th round of the 2005 MLB draft.

He played in the Orioles system through 2010 and spent a year in AA with the Philadelphia Phillies in 2011. In 2012, he was with the Southern Maryland Blue Crabs in the Atlantic League of Professional Baseball.

In seven minor league seasons playing shortstop, second base, and outfield he batted .285/.366/.370 with 8 home runs and 72 stolen bases in 1,798 at bats.

He also played for the Spain national baseball team in the 2009 Baseball World Cup, where he won the "Best Batter" award, and the 2013 World Baseball Classic.

Figueroa was named the first base, outfield, and base running coach for the Philadelphia Phillies prior to the 2019 season.

== Personal life ==
His identical twin brother, Daniel Figueroa, was his teammate at Miami. Both were drafted by the Orioles in 2005, and they played together in the minors and with the Spanish national team.
