= Anthony Granato =

Italian–Canadian baseball player

Free agent
- Infielder
- Born: March 18, 1981 (age 44); Toronto, Ontario, Canada
- Bats: Both Throws: Right
- Stats at Baseball Reference
Medals
Men's baseball
Representing Italy
European Baseball Championship
Gold medal – first place	2010 Germany	National team

Anthony Nicholas Granato (born March 18, 1981) is an Italian–Canadian professional baseball infielder who is a free agent.

Granato attended Virginia Commonwealth University and played in the farm systems of the Chicago Cubs and Colorado Rockies. He subsequently played in the Canadian-American Association and Atlantic League of Professional Baseball. Between 2010 and 2011 he played for San Marino Baseball Club in the Italian Baseball League, then he didn't play for any franchise.

Despite it, he continued to play with the Italy national baseball team, being also called for the 2013 World Baseball Classic.
