= Henan Elephants (baseball) =

Chinese baseball team

Henan Elephants is a team of the Chinese Baseball League which started to participate the league in the 2009 season.
