= Jesús Merchán =

Venezuelan baseball player (born 1981)

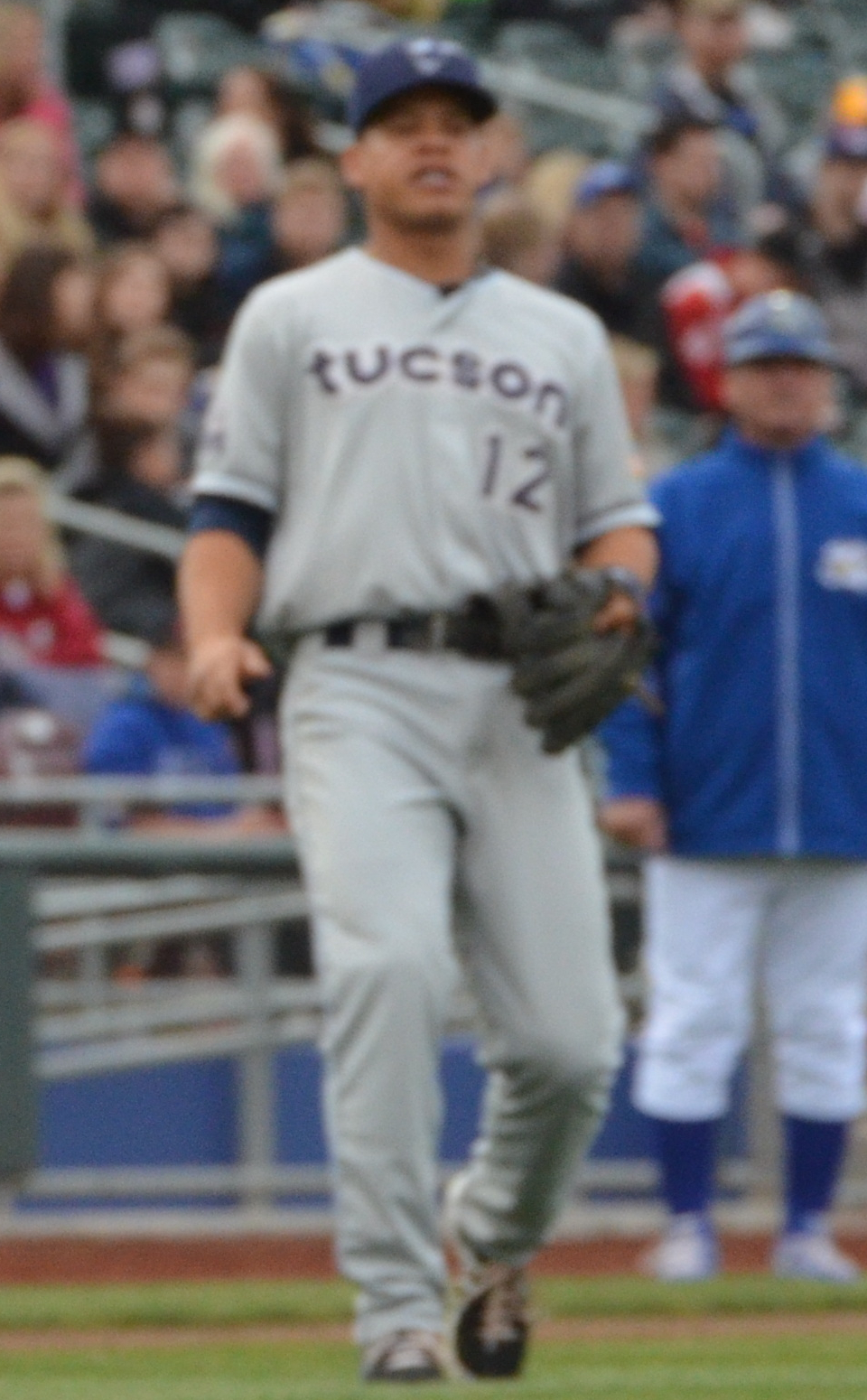
- Merchán playing for the Tucson Padres, triple-A affiliates of the San Diego Padres, in 2013
- Shortstop
- Born: March 26, 1981 (age 45); Maracay, Aragua, Venezuela
- Bats: Right Throws: Right
- Stats at Baseball Reference

Jesús Delfin Merchán (born March 26, 1981) is a Venezuelan former professional baseball shortstop and current hitting coach for the GCL Marlins.

== Career ==
Previously he played in the farm systems of the Minnesota Twins (2000–2005), Philadelphia Phillies (2005–2007), Seattle Mariners (2007), Arizona Diamondbacks (2008), Cleveland Indians (2009), Toronto Blue Jays (2010), Florida Marlins (2011), Colorado Rockies (2011) and San Diego Padres (2013). He also played in the Atlantic League of Professional Baseball for the Lancaster Barnstormers in 2012.

Merchán was named as the hitting coach for the Batavia Muckdogs of the Miami Marlins organization for the 2018 season.

Merchán was named as the hitting coach for the GCL Marlins of the Miami Marlins organization for the 2019 season.

Merchán played for the Spain national baseball team in the 2013 World Baseball Classic.
