= 2023 World Baseball Classic qualification rosters =

Twelve nations competed in the 2023 World Baseball Classic qualification.

== Pool A ==
=== Czech Republic ===
Manager
(Czech Republic) Pavel Chadim

Coaches
Joe Truesdale, John Hussey, Alex Derhak, David Winkler

Player	No.	Pos.	DOB and age	Team	League	Birthplace
Filip Čapka	14	P	November 4, 1998 (aged 23)	(Czech Republic) Draci Brno	Extraliga	(Czech Republic) Brno
Tomáš Duffek	7	P	September 12, 1989 (aged 33)	(Czech Republic) Eagles Praha	Extraliga	(Czech Republic) Prague
Lukáš Ercoli	63	P	April 17, 1996 (aged 26)	(Czech Republic) Hroši Brno	Extraliga	(Czech Republic) Roudnice
Lukáš Hlouch	60	P	December 12, 2000 (aged 21)	(Czech Republic) Hroši Brno	Extraliga	(Czech Republic) Třebíč
Michal Kovala	1	P	December 28, 2003 (aged 18)	(Czech Republic) Arrows Ostrava	Extraliga	(Czech Republic) Ostrava
Marek Krejčiřík	97	P	June 27, 2001 (aged 21)	(Czech Republic) Hroši Brno	Extraliga	(Czech Republic) Brno
David Mergans	43	P	February 27, 2002 (aged 20)	(Italy) Milano Baseball	Serie B	(Czech Republic) Brno
Marek Minařík	15	P	June 28, 1993 (aged 29)	(Czech Republic) Tempo Praha	Extraliga	(Czech Republic) Louny
Jan Novák	34	P	January 19, 1994 (aged 28)	(Czech Republic) Sokol Hluboká	Extraliga	(Czech Republic) Prague
Daniel Padyšák	23	P	July 2, 2000 (aged 22)	(United States) Charleston Southern Buccaneers	Big South Conference	(Czech Republic) Prague
Jake Rabinowitz	57	P	October 29, 1987 (aged 34)	(Czech Republic) Tempo Praha	Extraliga	(United States) New York City
Ondřej Satoria	35	P	February 26, 1997 (aged 25)	(Czech Republic) Arrows Ostrava	Extraliga	(Czech Republic) Ostrava
Martin Schneider	13	P	March 4, 1986 (aged 36)	(Czech Republic) Draci Brno	Extraliga	(Czech Republic) Olomouc
Jan Tomek	8	P	January 29, 1992 (aged 30)	(Germany) Regensburg Legionäre	Bundesliga	(Czech Republic) Frýdek-Místek
Martin Červenka	55	C	August 3, 1992 (aged 30)	(Czech Republic) Eagles Praha	Extraliga	(Czech Republic) Prague
Daniel Vavruša	32	C	July 9, 1991 (aged 31)	(Germany) Heidenheim Heideköpfe	Bundesliga	(Czech Republic) Prague
Martin Červinka	19	IF	March 3, 1997 (aged 25)	(Czech Republic) Draci Brno	Extraliga	(Czech Republic) Brno
Jakub Hajtmar	2	IF	June 14, 1987 (aged 35)	(Czech Republic) Draci Brno	Extraliga	(Czech Republic) Brno
Jakub Kubica	40	IF	March 13, 1998 (aged 24)	(Czech Republic) Arrows Ostrava	Extraliga	(Czech Republic) Ostrava
Vojtěch Menšík	77	IF	May 24, 1998 (aged 24)	(Czech Republic) Hroši Brno	Extraliga	(Czech Republic) Brno
Martin Mužík	49	IF	April 23, 1996 (aged 26)	(Czech Republic) Sokol Hluboká	Extraliga	(Czech Republic) České Budějovice
Milan Prokop	31	IF	February 12, 2003 (aged 19)	(Czech Republic) Draci Brno	Extraliga	(Czech Republic) Brno
Filip Smola	16	IF	October 4, 1997 (aged 24)	(Czech Republic) Tempo Praha	Extraliga	(Czech Republic) Prague
Petr Zýma	9	IF	July 28, 1989 (aged 33)	(Czech Republic) Eagles Praha	Extraliga	(Czech Republic) Prague
Arnošt Dubový	20	OF	April 1, 1992 (aged 30)	(Czech Republic) Draci Brno	Extraliga	(Czech Republic) Brno
Jakub Grepl	30	OF	October 14, 1999 (aged 22)	(Czech Republic) Arrows Ostrava	Extraliga	(Czech Republic) Ostrava
Marek Chlup	73	OF	January 9, 1999 (aged 23)	(Czech Republic) Eagles Praha	Extraliga	(Czech Republic) Turnov
Matěj Menšík	33	OF	May 11, 1992 (aged 30)	(Czech Republic) Technika Brno	Extraliga	(Czech Republic) Brno

=== France ===
Manager
(United States) Bruce Bochy
Coaches
Joe Bochy, Tom Levasseur, Keino Pérez, Boris Rothermundt, Steve Smith

Player	No.	Pos.	DOB and age	Team	League	Birthplace
Yoimer Camacho	27	P	February 24, 1990 (aged 32)	(Mexico) Pericos de Puebla	Mexican League	(Venezuela) Santa Teresa del Tuy
Kevin Canelón	22	P	January 16, 1994 (aged 28)	(France) Barracudas de Montpellier	Division 1	(Venezuela) Caracas
Gédéon Coste	34	P	August 15, 1996 (aged 26)	(France) Lions de Savigny-sur-Orge	Division 1	(France) Corbeil-Essonnes
Jhon García	28	P	May 19, 1987 (aged 35)	(France) Tigers de Toulouse	Division 1	(Venezuela) Tinaquillo
Marc-André Habeck	38	P	December 11, 1993 (aged 28)	(Italy) Parma Baseball	Serie A	(Canada) Winnipeg
Mathias LaCombe	6	P	June 12, 2002 (aged 20)	(France) Tigers de Toulouse	Division 1	(France) Libourne
Yorfrank López	29	P	December 1, 1990 (aged 31)	(France) Cougars de Montigny	Division 1	Barcelona, Venezuela
Robinson Maestre	26	P	September 11, 1995 (aged 27)	(France) Cougars de Montigny	Division 1	(Venezuela) Miranda
Quentin Moulin	11	P	May 28, 2001 (aged 21)	(France) Huskies de Rouen	Division 1	(France) Vernon, Eure
Owen Ozanich	23	P	June 23, 1989 (aged 33)	(France) Barracudas de Montpellier	Division 1	(France) Annemasse
José Paula	20	P	April 18, 1999 (aged 23)	(France) Templiers de Sénart	Division 1	Fort-de-France, Martinique
Shane Priest	8	P	June 17, 1995 (aged 27)	(France) Templiers de Sénart	Division 1	United States
Esteban Prioul	17	P	August 25, 1997 (aged 25)	(France) Huskies de Rouen	Division 1	(France) Fougères
Keivy Rojas	31	P	February 26, 1993 (aged 29)	(France) Tigers de Toulouse	Division 1	Valencia, Venezuela
Kenjiro Sugiura	10	P	April 10, 1998 (aged 24)	(France) Barracudas de Montpellier	Division 1	(Japan) Tokyo
Iván Acuña	24	C	February 18, 1995 (aged 27)	(France) Lions de Savigny-sur-Orge	Division 1	(Venezuela) Caracas
Fabian Kovacs	12	C	June 25, 2000 (aged 22)	(France) Barracudas de Montpellier	Division 1	(France) Grasse
Nolan Solivérès	13	C	August 30, 1997 (aged 25)	(France) Tigers de Toulouse	Division 1	(France) Paris
Alfredo Angarita	7	IF	November 16, 1996 (aged 25)	(France) Lions de Savigny-sur-Orge	Division 1	(Venezuela) Maracay
Daniel Patrice	14	IF	May 20, 1995 (aged 27)	(Germany) München-Haar Disciples	Bundesliga	(France) Villeurbanne
Alexander Perdomo	4	IF	May 24, 1993 (aged 29)	(France) Templiers de Sénart	Division 1	(Venezuela) Maracay
Daniel Rosell	3	IF	May 25, 2000 (aged 22)	(France) Boucaniers de La Rochelle	Division 1	(Cuba) Havana
Yeixon Ruiz	2	IF	March 19, 1991 (aged 31)	(France) Lions de Savigny-sur-Orge	Division 1	(Dominican Republic) San José de Ocoa
Ariel Soriano	19	IF	November 24, 1991 (aged 30)	(France) Barracudas de Montpellier	Division 1	La Romana, Dominican Republic
Paolo Brossier	9	OF	July 15, 2000 (aged 22)	(France) Barracudas de Montpellier	Division 1	(France) Alès
Bastien Dagneau	30	OF	March 29, 1995 (aged 27)	(France) Huskies de Rouen	Division 1	(France) Poissy
Leo Jiminian	21	OF	February 21, 1999 (aged 23)	(France) Lions de Savigny-sur-Orge	Division 1	(France) Saint-Lô
Maël Zan	16	OF	September 13, 1999 (aged 23)	(France) Barracudas de Montpellier	Division 1	(France) Bayonne

=== Germany ===
Manager
(Belgium) Steve Janssen
Coaches
Kris van Deuren, Troy Williams, Simon Walters, Shawn Roof, Bernard Beckman

Player	No.	Pos.	DOB and age	Team	League	Birthplace
Michael Bienlien	22	P	March 19, 1998 (aged 24)	(United States) Lakeland Flying Tigers	Florida State League	(United States) Honolulu
Brian Flynn	61	P	April 19, 1990 (aged 32)	Free agent		(United States) Tulsa, Oklahoma
Jake Gilbert	45	P	December 1, 1996 (aged 25)	(United States) Dayton Dragons	Midwest League	(United States) Evans, Georgia
Chris Holba	11	P	August 31, 1996 (aged 26)	Free agent		(Germany) Sindelfingen
Sascha Koch	9	P	November 30, 1997 (aged 24)	(Germany) Bonn Capitals	Bundesliga	(Germany) Troisdorf
Enorbel Márquez	35	P	December 11, 1974 (aged 47)	(Germany) Berlin Flamingos	Bundesliga	(Cuba) Palma Soriano
Jordan Martinson	36	P	March 7, 1997 (aged 25)	(United States) Kansas City Monarchs	American Association	(United States) Bedford, Texas
Niklas Rimmel	41	P	July 5, 1999 (aged 23)	(United States) Fort Myers Mighty Mussels	Florida State League	(Germany) Berlin
Kit Scheetz	40	P	May 18, 1994 (aged 28)	(Mexico) Mariachis de Guadalajara	Mexican League	(United States) Midlothian, Virginia
Sven Schuller	49	P	January 17, 1996 (aged 26)	(Germany) Regensburg Legionäre	Bundesliga	(Germany) Wuppertal
Tommy Sommer	19	P	September 25, 1998 (aged 23)	(United States) Winston-Salem Dash	South Atlantic League	(United States) Carmel, Indiana
Duke von Schamann	29	P	June 3, 1991 (aged 31)	(United States) York Revolution	Atlantic League	(United States) Tulsa, Oklahoma
Maurice Wilhelm	31	P	October 6, 1987 (aged 34)	(Germany) Bonn Capitals	Bundesliga	(Germany) Berlin
Nick Wittgren	51	P	May 29, 1991 (aged 31)	Free agent		(United States) Torrance, California
Vincent Ahrens	5	C	October 27, 1993 (aged 28)	(Germany) Bonn Capitals	Bundesliga	(Germany) Cologne
Simon Gühring	14	C	July 14, 1983 (aged 39)	(Germany) Heidenheim Heideköpfe	Bundesliga	(Germany) Stuttgart
Bruce Maxwell	21	C	December 20, 1990 (aged 31)	(Mexico) Acereros de Monclova	Mexican League	(Germany) Wiesbaden
Eric Brenk	30	IF	March 22, 1992 (aged 30)	(Germany) Bonn Capitals	Bundesliga	(United States) Long Beach, California
Marco Cardoso	3	IF	December 14, 1999 (aged 22)	(Germany) Stuttgart Reds	Bundesliga	(Germany) Paderborn
Lucas Dunn	8	IF	April 30, 1999 (aged 23)	(United States) Fort Wayne TinCaps	Midwest League	(United States) Panama City, Florida
William Germaine	26	IF	October 28, 1994 (aged 27)	(Germany) Tübingen Hawks	Bundesliga	(Canada) Aldergrove, Langley
Wilson Lee	16	IF	December 12, 1991 (aged 30)	(Germany) Bonn Capitals	Bundesliga	(Australia) Darwin, Northern Territory
Cody Schultz	4	IF	June 16, 1999 (aged 23)	(United States) Metro State Roadrunners	Rocky Mountain Conference	(United States) Tampa, Florida
Daniel Aldrich	32	OF	October 5, 1990 (aged 31)	(United States) San Rafael Pacifics	Pecos League	(Germany) Würzburg
Aaron Altherr	23	OF	January 14, 1991 (aged 31)	Free agent		(Germany) Landstuhl
Kevin Kotowski	24	OF	January 5, 1991 (aged 31)	(Germany) Mainz Athletics	Bundesliga	(Germany) Frankfurt
Shawn Larry	7	OF	September 2, 1991 (aged 31)	(Germany) Heidenheim Heideköpfe	Bundesliga	(Germany) Bad Windsheim
Demetrius Moorer	1	OF	August 19, 1993 (aged 29)	(United States) Wild Health Genomes	Atlantic League	(United States) Homestead, Florida

=== Great Britain ===
Manager
(United States) Drew Spencer
Coaches
Albert Cartwright, Zach Graefser, TS Reed, Brad Marcelino, Conor Brooks, Alan Dean, Jesse Guffey

Player	No.	Pos.	DOB and age	Team	League	Birthplace
Donovan Benoit	18	P	22 January 1999 (aged 23)	(United States) Dayton Dragons	Midwest League	(United States) Key West
Daniel Cooper	33	P	6 November 1986 (aged 35)			(United States) Newport Beach, California
Chavez Fernander	34	P	7 July 1997 (aged 25)	(United States) West Michigan Whitecaps	Midwest League	(The Bahamas) Freeport, Bahamas
Gunnar Groen	35	P	1 July 1997 (aged 25)	(United States) ACL Diamondbacks	Arizona Complex League	(United Kingdom) London
McKenzie Mills	50	P	19 November 1995 (aged 26)	(Mexico) Tigres de Quintana Roo	Mexican League	(United States) Marietta, Georgia
Akeel Morris	24	P	14 November 1992 (aged 29)	(United States) Long Island Ducks	Atlantic League	(United States Virgin Islands) Saint Thomas
Cam Opp	23	P	4 November 1995 (aged 26)	(United States) Binghamton Rumble Ponies	Eastern League	(United States) Denver
Michael Petersen	25	P	16 May 1994 (aged 28)	(United States) ACL Rockies	Arizona Complex League	(United Kingdom) Middlesex
Chris Reed	45	P	20 May 1990 (aged 32)			(United Kingdom) London
Michael Roth	29	P	15 February 1990 (aged 32)			(United States) Greenville, South Carolina
Matteo Sollecito	27	P	26 December 2000 (aged 21)	(United States) Swarthmore Garnet	Centennial Conference	(United Kingdom) London
Tahnaj Thomas	17	P	16 June 1999 (aged 23)	(United States) Altoona Curve	Eastern League	(The Bahamas) Freeport, Bahamas
Alex Webb	32	P	19 July 1994 (aged 28)			(Canada) Surrey, British Columbia
Vance Worley	49	P	25 September 1987 (aged 34)	(United States) Kane County Cougars	American Association	(United States) Sacramento, California
Shamoy Christopher	15	C	6 October 1997 (aged 24)	(United States) Sioux Falls Canaries	American Association	(British Virgin Islands) Tortola
Ural Forbes	36	C	13 April 1998 (aged 24)			(The Bahamas) Freeport, Bahamas
Harry Ford	8	C	21 February 2003 (aged 19)	(United States) Modesto Nuts	California League	(United States) Atlanta
Kent Blackstone	6	IF	15 February 1994 (aged 28)	(United States) Southern Maryland Blue Crabs	Atlantic League	(United States) Plano, Texas
Alex Crosby	12	IF	30 July 1993 (aged 29)	(United States) Southern Maryland Blue Crabs	Atlantic League	(United States) Vacaville, California
Raul Shah	4	IF	15 October 1993 (aged 28)	(United States) Southern Maryland Blue Crabs	Atlantic League	(United Kingdom) Chatham, Kent
Aaron Singh	7	IF	4 March 1997 (aged 25)			(United States) Artesia, California
Nick Ward	11	IF	19 October 1995 (aged 26)	(United States) Washington Wild Things	Frontier League	(United States) Kennett Square, PA
Justin Wylie	2	IF	26 August 1996 (aged 26)	(United States) New Jersey Jackals	Frontier League	(United States) Lancaster, Pennsylvania
Kennard Dawson	5	OF	16 May 2000 (aged 22)			(British Virgin Islands) Tortola
D'Shawn Knowles	9	OF	16 January 2001 (aged 21)	(United States) Tri-City Dust Devils	Northwest League	(The Bahamas) New Providence
Matt Koperniak	14	OF	8 February 1998 (aged 24)	(United States) Springfield Cardinals	Texas League	(United Kingdom) London
Jaden Rudd	3	OF	16 August 2002 (aged 20)	(United States) FCL Blue Jays	Florida Complex League	(United Kingdom) Suffolk
Anfernee Seymour	1	OF	24 June 1995 (aged 27)	(United States) Long Island Ducks	Atlantic League	(The Bahamas) Nassau, Bahamas

=== Spain ===
Manager
(Venezuela) Nelson Prada
Coaches
Nestor Pérez, Juan Rincón, Candelario Díaz, Félix Cano, Manuel Olivera

Player	No.	Pos.	DOB and age	Team	League	Birthplace
Daniel Álvarez	35	P	June 28, 1996 (aged 26)	(Spain) Tenerife Marlins	División de Honor de Béisbol	(Venezuela) Barquisimeto
Rogelio Armenteros	50	P	June 30, 1994 (aged 28)	Free agent		(Cuba) Havana
Fernando Báez	41	P	February 1, 1992 (aged 30)	(Italy) San Marino Baseball	Serie A	(Dominican Republic) Sabana Grande de Palenque
Jorge Balboa	23	P	July 15, 1986 (aged 36)	(Spain) CB Viladecans	División de Honor de Béisbol	(Spain) San Sebastián
Vicente Campos	34	P	July 27, 1992 (aged 30)	(Mexico) Pericos de Puebla	Mexican League	(Venezuela) La Guaira
Rhiner Cruz	49	P	November 1, 1986 (aged 35)	(Mexico) Piratas de Campeche	Mexican League	(Dominican Republic) Santo Domingo
Víctor Díaz	30	P	October 6, 1993 (aged 28)	(Spain) Tenerife Marlins	División de Honor de Béisbol	(Venezuela) Guanare
Armando Dueñas	26	P	September 17, 1994 (aged 27)	(Spain) San Inazio Beisbol	División de Honor de Béisbol	(Cuba) Matanzas
Yeudy García	29	P	October 6, 1992 (aged 29)	(Spain) Tenerife Marlins	División de Honor de Béisbol	(Dominican Republic) Sabana Yegua
Ronald Medrano	36	P	September 17, 1995 (aged 26)	(Spain) Tenerife Marlins	División de Honor de Béisbol	(Nicaragua) Managua
Yoanner Negrín	37	P	April 29, 1984 (aged 38)	(Mexico) Leones de Yucatán	Mexican League	(Cuba) Havana
Orlando Rodríguez	20	P	December 16, 1995 (aged 26)	(United States) Cedar Rapids Kernels	Midwest League	(United States) Miami Gardens
Lowuin Sacramento	45	P	September 17, 1995 (aged 26)	(Spain) Astros de Valencia	División de Honor de Béisbol	(Venezuela) El Tigre
Elio Silva	28	P	August 21, 1995 (aged 27)	(Spain) San Inazio Beisbol	División de Honor de Béisbol	(Venezuela) Maracay
Omar Hernández	12	C	December 10, 2001 (aged 20)	(United States) Columbia Fireflies	Carolina League	(Cuba) Havana
Gabriel Lino	43	C	May 17, 1993 (aged 29)	(Mexico) Guerreros de Oaxaca	Mexican League	(Venezuela) Maracay
Oscar Angulo	13	IF	February 1, 1984 (aged 38)	(Italy) Nettuno Baseball Club	Serie A	(Venezuela) Barquisimeto
Leopoldo Correa	8	IF	December 3, 1991 (aged 30)	(Spain) San Inazio Beisbol	División de Honor de Béisbol	(Venezuela) Ocumare del Tuy
Noelvi Marte	24	IF	October 16, 2001 (aged 20)	(United States) Dayton Dragons	Midwest League	(Dominican Republic) Cotuí
Leo Rodríguez	2	IF	December 11, 1991 (aged 30)	(Italy) Parma Baseball	Serie A	(Dominican Republic) Vicente Noble
Jesús Ustariz	16	IF	April 26, 1993 (aged 29)	(Italy) San Marino Baseball	Serie A	(Venezuela) Caracas
Edison Valerio	19	IF	August 20, 1994 (aged 28)	(Spain) Astros de Valencia	División de Honor de Béisbol	(Dominican Republic) Santo Domingo
Engel Beltré	7	OF	November 1, 1989 (aged 32)	Free agent		(Dominican Republic) Santo Domingo
Justin Connell	44	OF	March 11, 1999 (aged 23)	(United States) Wilmington Blue Rocks	South Atlantic League	(Spain) Barcelona
Lesther Galvan	14	OF	April 10, 1990 (aged 32)	(Spain) Tenerife Marlins	División de Honor de Béisbol	(Venezuela) Caracas
Frank Hernández	9	OF	December 10, 2001 (aged 20)	(United States) ACL Cubs	Arizona Complex League	(Cuba) Havana
Daniel Jiménez	10	OF	April 23, 1996 (aged 26)	(Mexico) Piratas de Campeche	Mexican League	(Venezuela) Caracas
Chris Kwitzer	38	OF	January 26, 1995 (aged 27)	(United States) New York Boulders	Frontier League	(United States) Buffalo, New York

=== South Africa ===
Manager
(United States) Andy Berglund
Coaches
Neil Adonis, Jody Birch, Kevin Johnson, Corey Lee, Erick Threets

Player	No.	Pos.	DOB and age	Team	League	Birthplace
Derick Baylis		RHP	July 17, 1987 (aged 35)	(South Africa) Western Cape	South African Baseball League	(South Africa) Cape Town, Western Cape
Daryn Chalmers		RHP	June 21, 1990 (aged 32)	(South Africa) Western Cape	South African Baseball League	(South Africa) Cape Town, Western Cape
Dylan De Meyer		RHP	September 16, 1992 (aged 30)			(South Africa) Centurion, Gauteng
Jared Elario		RHP	October 14, 1988 (aged 33)	(South Africa) Western Cape	South African Baseball League	(South Africa) Cape Town, Western Cape
Justin Erasmus		RHP	January 22, 1990 (aged 32)	(Australia) Canberra Cavalry	Australian Baseball League	(South Africa) Johannesburg, Gauteng
Dean Jacobs		LHP	September 21, 1991 (aged 30)	(South Africa) Athlone A’s	Cape Town Baseball Federation	(South Africa) Cape Town, Western Cape
Damon King		RHP	August 21, 1997 (aged 25)			South Africa
Robert Lewis-Walker		RHP	April 7, 1993 (aged 29)			(South Africa) Durban, KwaZulu-Natal
Kieran Lovegrove		RHP	July 28, 1994 (aged 28)			(South Africa) Johannesburg, Gauteng
Daniel Mendelsohn		RHP	February 9, 1996 (aged 26)	(Germany) Füssen Royal Bavarians	Baseball-Bundesliga	(South Africa) Pietermaritzburg, KwaZulu-Natal
Brandon Smith		RHP	February 12, 2000 (aged 22)	(United States) Grand View University	NAIA	(South Africa) Durbanville, Western Cape
Lloyd Stevens		RHP	March 24, 1998 (aged 24)			South Africa
Kevin Townend		RHP	October 24, 1986 (aged 35)	(South Africa) Western Cape	South African Baseball League	(South Africa) Cape Town, Western Cape
Kyle Botha		C	August 7, 1988 (aged 34)	(South Africa) Western Cape	South African Baseball League	(South Africa) Edenvale, Gauteng
Dayle Feldtman		C	February 4, 1991 (aged 31)	(South Africa) Western Cape	South African Baseball League	(South Africa) Cape Town, Western Cape
Tyrone Milne		C	February 20, 1997 (aged 25)	(South Africa) Bellville Tygers	Cape Town Baseball Federation	South Africa
Christiaan Beyers		IF	May 17, 1995 (aged 27)	(Germany) Paderborn Untouchables	Baseball-Bundesliga	South Africa
Nicholas Eagles		IF	August 9, 1996 (aged 26)			South Africa
Josh Hendricks		IF	September 11, 1991 (aged 31)			(Australia) Vermont South, Victoria
Gift Ngoepe		IF	January 18, 1990 (aged 32)			(South Africa) Polokwane, Limpopo
Victor Ngoepe		IF	February 9, 1998 (aged 24)			(South Africa) Polokwane, Limpopo
Jonathan Phillips		IF	April 16, 1986 (aged 36)	(South Africa) Western Cape	South African Baseball League	(South Africa) Cape Town, Western Cape
Tyler Smith		IF	November 4, 1997 (aged 24)	(Czech Republic) Hrosi Brno	Extraliga	(South Africa) Durban, KwaZulu-Natal
Keegan Swanepoel		IF	June 17, 1987 (aged 35)		(South Africa) Cape Town, Western Cape	
Brandon Bouillon		OF	March 21, 1989 (aged 33)	(South Africa) Gauteng	South African Baseball League	(South Africa) Johannesburg, Gauteng
Jason Carelse		OF	April 16, 1996 (aged 26)	(South Africa) Athlone A’s	Cape Town Baseball Federation	(South Africa) Cape Town, Western Cape
Brandon Edmunds		OF	January 9, 1989 (aged 33)			(South Africa) Johannesburg, Gauteng
Benjamin Smith		OF	November 30, 1987 (aged 34)	(South Africa) Western Cape	South African Baseball League	(South Africa) Cape Town, Western Cape

== Pool B ==
=== Argentina ===
Manager
(Argentina) Rolando Arnedo
Coaches
Marcelo Alfonsin, Eduardo Capdevila, Gabriel Sansó, Nicholás Solari

Player	No.	Pos.	DOB and age	Team	League	Birthplace
Matias Bartol		LHP	August 11, 2004 (aged 18)			(Argentina) Buenos Aires
Thomas Cuenca	31	RHP	November 7, 2000 (aged 21)	(Argentina) Infernales de Salta	Argentine Baseball League	(Argentina) Buenos Aires
Diego Echeverría	49	RHP	January 1, 1985 (aged 37)	(Argentina) Águilas de Salta	Argentine Baseball League	(Argentina) Dolores, Buenos Aires
Juan Elorza	28	RHP	April 24, 2000 (aged 22)	(Argentina) Pumas de Córdoba	Argentine Baseball League	(Argentina) Córdoba
Carlos Gimenez	22	RHP	August 10, 1996 (aged 26)	(Argentina) Ferro Baseball Club	Liga Metropolitana de Béisbol	(Argentina)
Eric Ma	29	RHP	October 2, 1998 (aged 23)			(Argentina) Buenos Aires
José Mendoza	77	RHP	July 29, 1994 (aged 28)	(Germany) Stuttgart Reds	Bundesliga	(Venezuela) Guatire, Miranda
Guido Monis	16	LHP	March 10, 1979 (aged 43)			(Argentina) Buenos Aires
Franco Perez	11	RHP	August 12, 1994 (aged 28)	(Argentina) Infernales de Salta	Argentine Baseball League	(Argentina) La Plata, Buenos Aires
Lucas Ramon	21	RHP	May 8, 1996 (aged 26)	(Argentina) Infernales de Salta	Argentine Baseball League	(Argentina) Salta, Salta
Lucas Rementeria		LHP	July 4, 2005 (aged 17)	(Argentina) Águilas de Salta	Argentine Baseball League	(Argentina) Salta, Salta
Kevin Riello	25	RHP	February 28, 1997 (aged 25)	(Argentina) Infernales de Salta	Argentine Baseball League	(Argentina) Buenos Aires
Federico Robles	55	RHP	November 5, 1993 (aged 28)	(Italy) Torino Grizzlies	Italian Baseball League	(Argentina) Córdoba, Córdoba
Bruno Tartaglia		RHP	April 4, 2002 (aged 20)	(Argentina) Pumas de Córdoba	Argentine Baseball League	(Argentina) Córdoba, Córdoba
José Gerez		C	August 28, 1995 (aged 27)	(Argentina) Infernales de Salta	Argentine Baseball League	(Argentina) Salta, Salta
Lucas Nakandakare		C	September 18, 1989 (aged 32)	(Argentina) Buenos Aires Patriots	Liga Metropolitana de Béisbol	(Argentina) Vicente López, Buenos Aires
Nicolás Alvarado		IF	June 1, 2000 (aged 22)	(Argentina) Águilas de Salta	Argentine Baseball League	(Argentina) Salta, Salta

=== Brazil ===
Manager
(United States) Steve Finley
Coaches
Luis Alicea, Jose Thiago Caldeira, Marcos Guimaraes, LaTroy Hawkins, Kléber Ojima

Player	No.	Pos.	DOB and age	Team	League	Birthplace
Marcelo Arai	37	RHP	October 2, 1983 (aged 38)	(Brazil) Gecebs	Brazilian Baseball Championship	(Brazil) Dourados, Mato Grosso do Sul
Gabriel Barbosa	31	RHP	January 22, 2002 (aged 20)	(United States) Colorado Rockies (minors)	Major League Baseball	(Brazil) Bastos, São Paulo
Edilson Batista	19	LHP	July 7, 1997 (aged 25)			(Brazil) Marilia, São Paulo
Igor Januario	42	RHP	January 20, 1998 (aged 24)	(Germany) Mannheim Tornados	Baseball-Bundesliga	(Brazil) Marilia, São Paulo
Igor Kimura	41	RHP	April 14, 1999 (aged 23)	(France) Arvernes de Clermont-Ferrand	Division Èlite	(Brazil) Maringá, Paraná
Oscar Nakaoshi	39	LHP	March 28, 1991 (aged 31)	(Australia) Auckland Tuatara	Australian Baseball League	(Brazil) São Paulo, São Paulo
Christian Pedrol	15	RHP	June 15, 2000 (aged 22)	(Germany) Regensburg Legionäre	Bundesliga	(Brazil) São Paulo, São Paulo
Sulivan Ribeiro	47	LHP	December 16, 2003 (aged 18)	(United States) Oakland Athletics (minors)	Major League Baseball	(Brazil) Colorado, Paraná
Andre Rienzo	25	RHP	July 5, 1988 (aged 34)	San Marino Baseball Club	(Italy) Italian Baseball League	(Brazil) São Paulo, São Paulo
Felipe Natel	22	RHP	March 18, 1989 (aged 33)			(Brazil) Tatuí, São Paulo
Enzo Sawayama	34	LHP	October 15, 2003 (aged 18)			Japan
Douglas Takano	43	RHP	March 18, 1999 (aged 23)	(Brazil) Cruzeiro do Sol Foxes	Brazilian Baseball Championship	(Brazil) Maringá, Paraná
Heitor Tokar	98	RHP	October 25, 2000 (aged 21)	(United States) Houston Astros (minors)	Major League Baseball	(Brazil) Marília, São Paulo
Hector Villarroel	58	LHP	August 12, 1995 (aged 27)			(Venezuela) El Tigre, Anzoátegui
Eddy Arteaga	13	C	July 9, 1998 (aged 24)	(United States) Campbellsville University Tigers	NAIA	(United States) Miami, Florida
Marcio Kikuchi	27	C	July 22, 1989 (aged 33)	(Brazil) Atibaia	Brazilian Baseball Championship	Brazil
Daniel Molinari	6	C	May 8, 1996 (aged 26)	(United States) Lake Country DockHounds	American Association	(United States) Palo Alto, California
Damian Goulart	4	IF	April 6, 2003 (aged 19)			(United States) New York City, New York
Christian Lopes	3	IF	September 1, 1992 (aged 30)	Free agent		(United States) Huntington Beach, California
Tim Lopes	10	IF	June 24, 1994 (aged 28)	(United States) Colorado Rockies(minors)	Major League Baseball	(United States) Los Angeles, California
Vitor Ito	1	IF	February 16, 1995 (aged 27)			(Brazil) Marília, São Paulo
Victor Mascai	17	IF	February 10, 2001 (aged 21)	Free agent		(Brazil) Marília, São Paulo
Leonardo Reginatto	5	IF	April 10, 1990 (aged 32)	(Mexico) Rieleros de Aguascalientes	Mexican League	(Brazil) Curitiba, Paraná
Lucas Rojo	7	IF	April 4, 1994 (aged 28)	(Japan) Fukuoka Kitakyushuu Phoenix	Kyushu Asian League	(Brazil) São Roque, São Paulo
Daniel Chibana	81	OF	February 22, 1998 (aged 24)			(Brazil) São Paulo, São Paulo
Fernando Luciano	55	OF	April 13, 1992 (aged 30)	Saitama Musashi Heat Bears	Baseball Challenge League	(Brazil) Miranda, Mato Grosso do Sul
Gabriel Maciel	9	OF	January 10, 1999 (aged 23)	(United States) Oakland Athletics (minors)	Major League Baseball	(Brazil) Londrina, Paraná
Paulo Orlando	16	OF	November 1, 1985 (aged 36)	Free agent		(Brazil) São Paulo, São Paulo

=== New Zealand ===
Manager
(New Zealand) Scott Campbell
Coaches
Brian Anderson, Darren Bragg, Brian Matusz, Daniel Tan, Al Quintana

Player	No.	Pos.	DOB and age	Team	League	Birthplace
Charlie Adamson	30	RHP	March 27, 2001 (aged 21)	(United States) Santa Barbara City College Vaqueros	CCCAA	(United States) Malibu, California
Jimmy Boyce	44	RHP	June 2, 1997 (aged 25)	(United States) Sussex County Miners	Frontier League	(New Zealand) Auckland, Auckland
Zaid Flynn	36	RHP	August 19, 2003 (aged 19)	(United States) Yakima Valley College Yaks	NWAC	(United States) Edmonds, Washington
Nao Fukuda	45	LHP	August 30, 1999 (aged 23)	(Japan) Ibaraki Astro Planets	Baseball Challenge League	(Japan) Fukuoka, Fukuoka
Eugene Gay	20	RHP	June 21, 2001 (aged 21)	(United States) Frontier Community College Bobcats	NJCAA	(New Zealand) Edendale, Southland
Connor Gleeson	19	RHP	September 30, 1998 (aged 23)	(United States) Gardner-Webb Running Bulldogs	NCAA Division I	(New Zealand) Glendowie, Auckland
Todd Hatcher	21	LHP	October 23, 2000 (aged 21)	(New Zealand) Auckland Tuatara	Australian Baseball League	Subiaco, Western Australia
Mitchell Hughson	34	RHP	March 18, 1998 (aged 24)	(Australia) Brisbane Bandits	Australian Baseball League	(Australia) Brisbane, Queensland
Elliot Johnstone	24	RHP	September 24, 1998 (aged 23)	(United States) New York Mets (minors)	Major League Baseball	(New Zealand) Auckland, Auckland
Ryota Okumoto	2	LHP	April 2, 1992 (aged 30)	(New Zealand) North Shore Guardians	New Zealand Nationals	(Japan) Hiroshima, Hiroshima
Maclain Roberts	49	LHP	November 9, 2003 (aged 18)	(New Zealand) Auckland Tuatara	Australian Baseball League	New Zealand
Ryan Sanders	18	LHP	November 18, 2001 (aged 20)	(United States) St. Mary’s Gaels	NCAA Division I	(United States) Lancaster, California
Yuuki Takahashi	25	RHP	December 4, 2000 (aged 21)	(United States) Arkansas Tech Wonder Boys	NCAA Division II	(New Zealand) Auckland, Auckland
Ben Thompson	23	RHP	December 21, 1997 (aged 24)	(United States) Atlanta Braves (minors)	Major League Baseball	(New Zealand) Auckland, Auckland
Beau Te Wera Bishop	35	C	July 6, 1993 (aged 29)	(New Zealand) Auckland Tuatara	Australian Baseball League	(New Zealand) Wellington, Wellington
Faenza Bishop	77	C	March 14, 2001 (aged 21)	(New Zealand) Howick Pakuranga Hawks	New Zealand Nationals	(New Zealand) Wellington, Wellington
Connar O'Gorman	12	C	December 25, 1993 (aged 28)			New Zealand
Duncan Izaaks	5	IF	November 25, 1992 (aged 29)			(South Africa) Pietermaritzburg, KwaZulu-Natal
Sam Kennelly	7	IF	January 9, 1996 (aged 26)	(Australia) Perth Heat	Australian Baseball League	Perth, Western Australia
Chayton Krauss	27	IF	March 7, 2003 (aged 19)	(United States) Grayson College Vikings	NJCAA	(New Zealand) Christchurch, Canterbury
Ayrton Laird	1	IF	October 5, 1999 (aged 22)	(New Zealand) Central City Baseball Club	New Zealand Nationals	(New Zealand) Auckland, Auckland
Daniel Lamb-Hunt	15	IF	May 20, 1987 (aged 35)	(Germany) Bonn Capitals	Bundesliga	(New Zealand) Auckland, Auckland
Jason Matthews	9	IF	April 9, 1997 (aged 25)	(United States) Chicago White Sox (minors)	Major League Baseball	(New Zealand) Auckland, Auckland
Nikau Pouaka-Grego	3	IF	September 13, 2004 (aged 18)	(United States) Philadelphia Phillies (minors)	Major League Baseball	(New Zealand) Christchurch, Canterbury
Max Brown	11	OF	April 30, 1993 (aged 29)	(New Zealand) Auckland Tuatara	Australian Baseball League	(United States) Seattle, Washington
Andrew Marck	89	OF	November 19, 1989 (aged 32)	(New Zealand) Auckland Tuatara	Australian Baseball League	(New Zealand) Auckland, Auckland
Kris Richards	14	OF	December 6, 1989 (aged 32)			(United States) Great Falls, Montana
Kane Swanson	6	OF	September 19, 2000 (aged 21)			(New Zealand) Takapuna, Auckland

=== Nicaragua ===
Manager
(Nicaragua) Marvin Benard
Coaches
Sandor Guido, Cairo Murillo, Henry Roa, Yader Roa

Player	No.	Pos.	DOB and age	Team	League	Birthplace
Jimmy Bermúdez		RHP	June 21, 1981 (aged 41)	(Nicaragua) Leones de León	Nicaraguan Professional Baseball League	(Nicaragua) Ticuantepe, Managua
Jorge Bucardo		RHP	October 18, 1989 (aged 32)	(Nicaragua) Gigantes de Rivas	Nicaraguan Professional Baseball League	(Nicaragua) León, León
Wilber Bucardo		RHP	October 20, 1987 (aged 34)	(Nicaragua) Tigres del Chinandega	Nicaraguan Professional Baseball League	(Nicaragua) León, León
Leonardo Crawford		LHP	February 2, 1997 (aged 25)	(United States) Los Angeles Dodgers (minors)	Major League Baseball	(Nicaragua) Puerto Cabezas, RACCN
Berman Espinoza		RHP	November 4, 1987 (aged 34)	(Nicaragua) Gigantes de Rivas	Nicaraguan Professional Baseball League	(Nicaragua) León, León
Fidencio Flores		RHP	October 9, 1991 (aged 30)	(Nicaragua) Indios del Bóer	Nicaraguan Professional Baseball League	(Nicaragua) León, León
Sheyder García		LHP	April 21, 1997 (aged 25)	(Nicaragua) Gigantes de Rivas	Nicaraguan Professional Baseball League	(Nicaragua)
Elvin García		LHP	May 14, 1990 (aged 32)	(Nicaragua) Indios del Bóer	Nicaraguan Professional Baseball League	(Nicaragua) Estelí, Estelí
Jesús Garrido		RHP	May 10, 1995 (aged 27)	(Nicaragua) Leones de León	Nicaraguan Professional Baseball League	(Nicaragua) Chinandega, Chinandega
Elías Gutiérrez		RHP	December 11, 1994 (aged 27)	(Nicaragua) Leones de León	Nicaraguan Professional Baseball League	(Nicaragua) Wiwilí de Jinotega, Jinotega
Carlos Teller		LHP	October 3, 1986 (aged 35)	(Mexico) Rieleros de Aguascalientes	Mexican Baseball League	(Nicaragua) Managua, Managua
Junior Téllez		RHP	July 1, 1990 (aged 32)	(Nicaragua) Tigres del Chinandega	Nicaraguan Professional Baseball League	(Nicaragua) León, León
Luis Allen		C	April 16, 1985 (aged 37)	(Nicaragua) Gigantes de Rivas	Nicaraguan Professional Baseball League	(Nicaragua) Ciudad Bolívar, Bolívar
Rodolfo Bone		C	May 22, 2000 (aged 22)	(United States) San Francisco Giants (minors)	Major League Baseball	(Nicaragua) Masaya, Masaya
Benjamín Alegría		IF	August 6, 1997 (aged 25)	(Nicaragua) Leones de León	Nicaraguan Professional Baseball League	(Nicaragua) Managua, Managua
Luis Castellón		IF	February 24, 1997 (aged 25)	(Nicaragua) Leones de León	Nicaraguan Professional Baseball League	(Nicaragua)
Ofilio Castro		IF	August 18, 1993 (aged 29)	(Nicaragua) Leones de León	Nicaraguan Professional Baseball League	(Nicaragua) Managua, Managua
Cheslor Cuthbert		IF	November 16, 1992 (aged 29)	(United States) Chicago White Sox (minors)	Major League Baseball	(Nicaragua) Corn Islands, RACCS
Jesús López		IF	October 5, 1996 (aged 25)	(Canada) Toronto Blue Jays (minors)	Major League Baseball	(Nicaragua) Managua, Managua
Iván Marín		IF	December 21, 1988 (aged 33)	(United States) Lincoln Saltdogs	American Association	(Nicaragua) Granada, Granada
Elmer Reyes		IF	November 26, 1990 (aged 31)	(Nicaragua) Indios del Bóer	Nicaraguan Professional Baseball League	(Nicaragua) Nagarote, León
Wuillians Vasquez		IF	July 26, 1983 (aged 36)	(Nicaragua) Gigantes de Rivas	Nicaraguan Professional Baseball League	(Venezuela) Acarigua, Portuguesa
Isaac Benard		OF	January 2, 1996 (aged 26)	(United States) Florence Freedom	Frontier League	(United States) West Richland, Washington
Dwight Britton		OF	July 17, 1987 (aged 35)	(Nicaragua) Leones de León	Nicaraguan Professional Baseball League	(Nicaragua) Corn Islands, RACCS
Jilton Calderón		OF	September 16, 1988 (aged 34)	(Nicaragua) Indios del Bóer	Nicaraguan Professional Baseball League	(Nicaragua) Jinotepe, Carazo
Ismael Munguía		OF	October 19, 1998 (aged 23)	(United States) San Francisco Giants (minors)	Major League Baseball	(Nicaragua) Chinandega, Chinandega
Norlando Valle		OF	August 2, 1994 (aged 28)	(Nicaragua) Tigres del Chinandega	Nicaraguan Professional Baseball League	(Nicaragua)

=== Pakistan ===
Manager
(Pakistan) Syed Fakhar Ali Shah
Coaches
Miah Rafique Choudhury, Peter Durkovic, Jobie Anderson, Wayne Arms, Manzar Shah

Player	No.	Pos.	DOB and age	Team	League	Birthplace
Adam Khan	10	P	May 2, 2002 (aged 20)	UBC Thunderbirds	NAIA	(Canada) Aurora, Ontario
Amaan Khan	21	P	November 16, 2005 (aged 16)	Lane Tech Champions	CPL	(United States) Chicago
Amir Asghar	11	P	January 6, 2000 (aged 22)	Bethune-Cookman Wildcats	NCAA	(United States) Hoffman Estates, Illinois
Atif Ahmad	38	P	April 16, 2001 (aged 21)			(Pakistan) Khyber Agency
Majeed Khan	6	P	April 30, 1976 (aged 46)			(Pakistan) Omara
Muhammad Aslam	16	P	April 9, 1995 (aged 27)			(Pakistan) Vehari
Muhammad Usman	23	P	May 1, 1986 (aged 36)			(Pakistan) Melsi Vehari
Muhammad Zohaib	17	P	April 17, 1992 (aged 30)			(Pakistan) Attock
Omar Arif	28	P	September 3, 1984 (aged 38)			(United States) Dallas
Osman Buttar	13	P	March 7, 1979 (aged 43)			(Canada) Etobicoke, Ontario
Salik Hasan	54	P	December 28, 2005 (aged 16)	Fairmont Prep Huskies	CIF	(United States) Santa Clara, California
Syed Ali Shah	7	P	June 16, 2004 (aged 18)			(Pakistan) Khyber Pakhtunkhwa
Tariq Nadeem	33	P	April 9, 1979 (aged 43)			(Pakistan) Okara
Yahya Hasan	53	P	December 28, 2005 (aged 16)	Fairmont Prep Huskies	CIF	(United States) Santa Clara, California
Iyad Ansari	20	C	June 30, 2004 (aged 18)			(Canada) Toronto
Umair Imdad Bhatti	24	C	March 3, 1987 (aged 35)			(Pakistan) Lahore
Muhammad Shah	55	C	June 16, 2004 (aged 18)			(Pakistan)
Alex Khan	9	IF	September 17, 2002 (aged 19)	West Virginia Mountaineers	NCAA	(United States) Frederick, Maryland
Faqir Hussain	18	IF	April 1, 1987 (aged 35)			(Pakistan) Charsadda
Pierce Khan	5	IF	June 29, 1997 (aged 25)			(United States) Richmond, Texas
Tariq Khan	26	IF	August 2, 2003 (aged 19)			(United States) Texas
Zan Von Schlegell	3	IF	April 30, 2004 (aged 18)	St. Thomas Tommies	NCAA	(United States) Downers Grove, Illinois
Muhammad Hussain	34	OF	December 4, 1997 (aged 24)	Army	Pakistan Men's Championship	(Pakistan) Chiniot
Amar Mahmood	1	OF	November 19, 2003 (aged 18)	De Anza Mountain Lions	NJCAA	(Canada) Edmonton
Rohan Shah	15	OF	October 27, 2001 (aged 20)	The Citadel Bulldogs	NCAA	(United States) Chicago
Sami Khan	4	OF	April 12, 2001 (aged 21)	Potomac State Catamounts	NJCAA	(United States) Sykesville, Maryland
Shahid Sattar	22	OF	June 14, 1996 (aged 26)			(United States) Dallas
Shan Sundu	12	OF	February 3, 2002 (aged 20)			(Japan) Kagawa Prefecture

=== Panama ===
Manager
(Panama) Luis Ortiz
Coaches
Len Picota, Julio Rangel, Hipólito Ortiz, Vicente Garibaldo

Player	No.	Pos.	DOB and age	Team	League	Birthplace
Harold Araúz	49	P	May 29, 1995 (aged 27)	(Panama) Coclé	FEDEBEIS	(Panama) Chiriquí, Chiriquí
Alberto Baldonado	25	P	February 1, 1993 (aged 29)	(Japan) Yomiuri Giants	Nippon Professional Baseball	(Panama) Colón
Enrique Burgos	70	P	November 23, 1990 (aged 31)	Free agent		Panama City
Randall Delgado	48	P	February 9, 1990 (aged 32)	Free agent		(Panama) Las Tablas, Los Santos
James González	23	P	September 15, 2000 (aged 22)	(United States) Stockton Ports	California League	(Panama) David, Chiriquí
Severino González	52	P	September 28, 1992 (aged 30)	Free agent		(Panama) Santiago de Veraguas
Alberto Guerrero	41	P	December 13, 1997 (aged 24)	Free agent		(Panama) Pacora
Matt Hardy	18	P	July 15, 1995 (aged 27)	(United States) Nashville Sounds	International League	(United States) Plantation, Florida
Ariel Jurado	57	P	January 30, 1996 (aged 26)	(United States) St. Paul Saints	International League	(Panama) Aguadulce, Coclé
Carlos Luna	15	P	September 25, 1996 (aged 26)	(United States) Biloxi Shuckers	Southern League	(Panama) Las Tablas, Los Santos
Humberto Mejía	62	P	March 3, 1997 (aged 25)	(Japan) Chunichi Dragons	Nippon Professional Baseball	Panama City
Wilfredo Pereira	26	P	April 26, 1999 (aged 23)	(United States) Peoria Chiefs	Midwest League	(Panama) Puerto Armuelles
Luis Ramos	16	P	June 5, 1995 (aged 27)	(Panama) Darién	FEDEBEIS	(Panama) Bella Vista, Chiriquí
Davis Romero	62	P	March 30, 1983 (aged 39)	(Panama) Coclé	FEDEBEIS	(Panama) Aguadulce, Coclé
Pedro Aguilar	98	C	May 20, 1989 (aged 33)	(Panama) Panamá Metro	FEDEBEIS	Panama City
Erasmo Caballero	98	C	May 25, 2001 (aged 21)	(Panama) Federales de Chiriquí	PROBEIS	(Panama) Chiriquí, Chiriquí
Carlos Sánchez	5	C	November 5, 1993 (aged 28)	(Panama) Bocas del Toro	FEDEBEIS	Panama City
Jonathan Araúz	3	IF	August 3, 1998 (aged 24)	(United States) Norfolk Tides	International League	(Panama) Alanje
José Caballero	77	IF	August 30, 1996 (aged 26)	(United States) Peoria Javelinas	Arizona Fall League	Panama City
L. J. Jones	27	IF	June 27, 1999 (aged 23)	(United States) Peoria Chiefs	Midwest League	(United States) San Diego
Edgar Muñoz	10	IF	October 30, 1991 (aged 30)	(Panama) Colón	FEDEBEIS	(Panama) Cristóbal, Colón
Rubén Tejada	11	IF	October 27, 1989 (aged 32)	Free agent		(Panama) Santiago de Veraguas
Joshwan Wright	39	IF	November 9, 2000 (aged 21)	(United States) Lansing Lugnuts	Midwest League	(Panama) Changuinola
Luis Castillo	89	OF	May 15, 1989 (aged 33)	(Panama) Coclé	FEDEBEIS	(Panama) Aguadulce, Coclé
Allen Córdoba	85	OF	December 6, 1995 (aged 26)	(Mexico) Algodoneros de Unión Laguna	Mexican League	(Panama) Changuinola
Rodrigo Orozco	24	OF	April 2, 1995 (aged 27)	(Canada) Ottawa Titans	Frontier League	Panama City
José Ramos	99	OF	January 1, 2001 (aged 21)	(United States) Glendale Desert Dogs	Arizona Fall League	(Panama) Chepo
Jhonny Santos	94	OF	October 2, 1996 (aged 25)	(Panama) Bocas del Toro	FEDEBEIS	(Panama) Puerto Armuelles
