= 2017 World Baseball Classic qualification rosters =

Sixteen nations competed at the 2017 World Baseball Classic qualification.

== Key ==
Pos.	Position
P	Pitcher
C	Catcher
IF	Infielder
OF	Outfielder

== Qualifier 1 ==
=== Australia ===
Manager
(Australia) Jon Debble
Coaches
Tony Harris

Player	No.	Pos.	DOB and age	Team	League	Birthplace
Warwick Saupold	30	P	January 16, 1990 (aged 26)	(United States) Detroit Tigers	Major League Baseball	Perth, Western Australia

=== New Zealand ===
Manager
(United States) Chris Woodward
Coaches

Player	No.	Pos.	DOB and age	Team	League	Birthplace
Boss Moanaroa	28	P	November 10, 1972 (aged 43)			Newcastle, New South Wales

=== South Africa ===
Manager
Alan Phillips
Coaches
Brian McAm

Player	No.	Pos.	DOB and age	Team	League	Birthplace
Gift Ngoepe	61	IF	January 18, 1990 (aged 26)	(United States) Pittsburgh Pirates (minors)	Major League Baseball	Randburg, Gauteng

=== Philippines ===
Manager
(United States) Tim Hulett
Coaches

Player	No.	Pos.	DOB and age	Team	League	Birthplace
Edmer Del Socorro	26	C	August 20, 1981 (aged 35)			Davao, Davao Region
Eric Farris	75	OF	March 3, 1986 (aged 30)			Sacramento, California
Juan Paulo Macasaet	28	OF	October 30, 1995 (aged 20)			Pasig, Rizal

== Qualifier 2 ==
=== Mexico ===
Manager
(United States) Edgar Gonzalez
Coaches
(United States) Nick Leyva

The following players represented Mexico at the qualifiers.

Player	No.	Pos.	DOB and age	Team	League	Birthplace
Miguel Aguilar	16	P	September 26, 1991 (aged 24)	(Mexico) Leones de Yucatán	Mexican League	(Mexico) Ciudad Obregón
Andrés Ávila	12	P	June 20, 1990 (aged 25)	(United States) Oakland Athletics (minors)	Major League Baseball	(Mexico) Guaymas
Arturo Barradas	28	P	August 10, 1987 (aged 28)	(Mexico) Rojos del Águila de Veracruz	Mexican League	(Mexico) Minatitlán
Carlos Bustamante	22	P	September 25, 1994 (aged 21)	(Mexico) Pericos de Puebla	Mexican League	(Mexico) Navojoa
Carlos Fisher	45	P	February 22, 1983 (aged 33)	(United States) Texas Rangers (minors)	Major League Baseball	(United States) West Covina, CA
Giovanny Gallegos	32	P	August 14, 1991 (aged 24)	(United States) New York Yankees (minors)	Major League Baseball	(Mexico) Ciudad Obregón
Jesús García	20	P	March 8, 1993 (aged 23)	(Mexico) Toros de Tijuana	Mexican League	(Mexico) Monterrey
Stephen Landazuri	44	P	January 6, 1992 (aged 24)	(United States) Seattle Mariners (minors)	Major League Baseball	(United States) Pomona, CA
Óliver Pérez	46	P	August 15, 1981 (aged 34)	(United States) Washington Nationals	Major League Baseball	(Mexico) Culiacán
Daniel Rodríguez	11	P	December 11, 1984 (aged 31)	(Mexico) Saraperos de Saltillo	Mexican League	(Mexico) Culiacán
Jake Sanchez	30	P	August 19, 1989 (aged 26)	(United States) Oakland Athletics (minors)	Major League Baseball	(United States) Brawley, CA
Mark Serrano	10	P	September 14, 1985 (aged 30)	(Mexico) Toros de Tijuana	Mexican League	(United States) Los Angeles
Javier Solano	31	P	March 31, 1990 (aged 25)	(Mexico) Sultanes de Monterrey	Mexican League	(Mexico) San Luis Río Colorado
Alejandro Soto	25	P	February 13, 1986 (aged 30)	(Mexico) Guerreros de Oaxaca	Mexican League	(Mexico) Huatabampo
Xorge Carrillo	14	C	April 12, 1989 (aged 26)	(United States) New York Mets (minors)	Major League Baseball	(Mexico) Tijuana
Erick Rodríguez	37	C	November 27, 1979 (aged 36)	(Mexico) Guerreros de Oaxaca	Mexican League	(Mexico) Monterrey
Humberto Sosa	42	C	October 13, 1985 (aged 30)	(Mexico) Rojos del Águila de Veracruz	Mexican League	(Mexico) Veracruz
José Amador	42	IF	August 20, 1979 (aged 36)	(Mexico) Acereros de Monclova	Mexican League	(Mexico) Mexicali
Jesse Castillo	43	IF	March 3, 1983 (aged 33)	(Mexico) Rieleros de Aguascalientes	Mexican League	(Mexico) Mexicali
Adrián González	23	IF	May 8, 1982 (aged 33)	(United States) Los Angeles Dodgers	Major League Baseball	(United States) San Diego
Walter Ibarra	13	IF	November 1, 1987 (aged 28)	(Mexico) Sultanes de Monterrey	Mexican League	(Mexico) Los Mochis
Alex Mejia	27	IF	January 8, 1991 (aged 25)	(United States) St. Louis Cardinals (minors)	Major League Baseball	(United States) Sylmar
Agustín Murillo	35	IF	May 5, 1982 (aged 33)	(Mexico) Sultanes de Monterrey	Mexican League	(Mexico) Tijuana
Esteban Quiroz	15	IF	February 17, 1992 (aged 24)	(Mexico) Tigres de Quintana Roo	Mexican League	(Mexico) Ciudad Obregón
José Aguilar	19	OF	May 19, 1990 (aged 25)	(Mexico) Leones de Yucatán	Mexican League	(Mexico) Maravatío
Sebastián Elizalde	24	OF	November 20, 1991 (aged 24)	(United States) Cincinnati Reds (minors)	Major League Baseball	(Mexico) Guaymas
Leo Heras	6	OF	May 29, 1990 (aged 25)	(United States) Houston Astros (minors)	Major League Baseball	(Mexico) Tijuana
Juan Pérez	6	OF	November 1, 1991 (aged 24)	(United States) Cincinnati Reds (minors)	Major League Baseball	(United States) Winnetka

=== Czech Republic ===
Manager
(Canada) Mike Griffin

The following players represented the Czech Republic at the qualifiers.

Player	No.	Pos.	DOB and age	Team	League	Birthplace
Jan Blažek	4	P	February 16, 1988 (aged 28)	Free agent		(Czech Republic) Prague
Boris Bokaj	20	P	August 13, 1986 (aged 29)	(Czech Republic) Arrows Ostrava	Czech Baseball Extraliga	(Czech Republic) Ostrava
Marek Červenka	5	P	February 5, 1991 (aged 25)	(Czech Republic) Kotlářka Praha	Czech Baseball Extraliga	(Czech Republic) Prague
Tomáš Duffek	7	P	September 12, 1989 (aged 26)	(Czech Republic) Eagles Praha	Czech Baseball Extraliga	(Czech Republic) Prague
Marek Minařík	46	P	June 28, 1993 (aged 22)	(Czech Republic) Kotlářka Praha	Czech Baseball Extraliga	(Czech Republic) Louny
Petr Minařík	18	P	July 4, 1984 (aged 31)	(Czech Republic) Draci Brno	Czech Baseball Extraliga	(Czech Republic) Trutnov
Daniel Mráz	8	P	August 19, 1987 (aged 28)	(Czech Republic) Technika Brno	Czech Baseball Extraliga	(Czech Republic) Brno
Jan Novák	22	P	January 19, 1994 (aged 22)	(Czech Republic) Kotlářka Praha	Czech Baseball Extraliga	(Czech Republic) Prague
Martin Schneider	13	P	March 4, 1986 (aged 30)	(Czech Republic) Draci Brno	Czech Baseball Extraliga	(Czech Republic) Olomouc
Michal Sobotka	32	P	August 13, 1992 (aged 23)	(Czech Republic) Draci Brno	Czech Baseball Extraliga	(Czech Republic) Brno
Alex Sogard	44	P	July 25, 1987 (aged 28)	Free agent		(United States) Phoeniz, AZ
John Straka	34	P	January 19, 1990 (aged 26)	(United States) Toronto Blue Jays (minors)	Major League Baseball	(United States) St. Louis Park, MN
Jan Tomek	10	P	January 29, 1992 (aged 24)	(Germany) Regensburg Legionäre	Baseball-Bundesliga	(Czech Republic) Frýdek-Místek
Petr Čech	37	C	October 13, 1987 (aged 28)	(Czech Republic) Draci Brno	Czech Baseball Extraliga	(Czech Republic) Ostrava
Martin Červenka	28	C	August 3, 1992 (aged 23)	(United States) Cleveland Indians (minors)	Major League Baseball	(Czech Republic) Prague
Jakub Voják	15	C	January 5, 1985 (aged 31)	(Czech Republic) Skokani Olomouc	Czech Baseball Extraliga	(Czech Republic) Olomouc
Mike Cervenak	24	IF	August 17, 1976 (aged 39)	Free agent		(United States) Trenton, MI
Přemek Chroust	12	IF	November 21, 1991 (aged 24)	(Czech Republic) Draci Brno	Czech Baseball Extraliga	(Czech Republic) Brno
Adam Hajtmar	1	IF	January 28, 1995 (aged 21)	(Czech Republic) Draci Brno	Czech Baseball Extraliga	(Czech Republic) Brno
Jakub Hajtmar	2	IF	June 14, 1987 (aged 28)	(Czech Republic) Draci Brno	Czech Baseball Extraliga	(Czech Republic) Brno
Tomáš Juněc	19	IF	October 20, 1993 (aged 22)	(Czech Republic) Arrows Ostrava	Czech Baseball Extraliga	(Czech Republic) Ostrava
Tomáš Polanský	21	IF	June 16, 1981 (aged 34)	(Czech Republic) Draci Brno	Czech Baseball Extraliga	(Czech Republic) Brno
Jakub Sládek	48	IF	February 17, 1990 (aged 26)	(Czech Republic) Kotlářka Praha	Czech Baseball Extraliga	(Czech Republic) Prague
Petr Zýma	9	IF	July 28, 1989 (aged 26)	(Czech Republic) Eagles Praha	Czech Baseball Extraliga	(Czech Republic) Prague
Matěj Hejma	33	OF	May 4, 1990 (aged 25)	(Czech Republic) Eagles Praha	Czech Baseball Extraliga	(Czech Republic) Prague
Jakub Malík	25	OF	July 11, 1989 (aged 26)	(Czech Republic) Arrows Ostrava	Czech Baseball Extraliga	(Czech Republic) Vítkovice
Michal Ondráček	14	OF	December 25, 1989 (aged 26)	(Czech Republic) Hroši Brno	Czech Baseball Extraliga	(Czech Republic) Kuřim
Petr Síla	3	OF	March 1, 1992 (aged 24)	(Czech Republic) Kotlářka Praha	Czech Baseball Extraliga	(Czech Republic) Prague

=== Germany ===
Manager
(United States) Garth Iorg
Coaches
(United States) Dennis Cook, (Germany) Martin Helmig, (United States) Willie Upshaw, (United States) Troy Williams

The following players represented Germany at the qualifiers.

Player	No.	Pos.	DOB and age	Team	League	Birthplace
Martin Dewald	5	P	March 5, 1986 (aged 30)	(Germany) Heidenheim Heideköpfe	Baseball-Bundesliga	(Germany) Mannheim
Lucas Dickman	18	P	June 14, 1996 (aged 19)	(Germany) Mainz Athletics	Baseball-Bundesliga	(Germany) Wiesbaden
Daniel Hinz	48	P	October 8, 1986 (aged 29)	(Germany) Paderborn Untouchables	Baseball-Bundesliga	(Germany) Berlin
Sascha Kosch	15	P	November 30, 1997 (aged 18)	(Germany) Bonn Capitals	Baseball-Bundesliga	(Germany) Troisdorf
Enorbel Márquez	25	P	December 11, 1974 (aged 41)	(Germany) Berlin Flamingos	Baseball-Bundesliga	(Cuba) Palma Soriano
Will Ohman	13	P	August 13, 1977 (aged 38)	Free agent		(Germany) Frankfurt
Sven Schüller	38	P	January 17, 1996 (aged 20)	(United States) Los Angeles Dodgers (minors)	Major League Baseball	(Germany) Wuppertal
Markus Solbach	21	P	August 26, 1991 (aged 24)	(United States) Arizona Diamondbacks (minors)	Major League Baseball	(Germany) Dormagen
Luke Sommer	30	P	June 22, 1985 (aged 30)	(Germany) Heidenheim Heideköpfe	Baseball-Bundesliga	(United States) Oregon City, OR
Lukas Steinlein	2	P	March 26, 1991 (aged 24)	(Germany) Haar Disciples	Baseball-Bundesliga	(Germany) Nuremberg
Jan-Niclas Stöcklin	34	P	May 11, 1990 (aged 25)	(Germany) Mainz Athletics	Baseball-Bundesliga	(Germany) Mainz
Daniel Thieben	19	P	September 18, 1993 (aged 22)	(Germany) Paderborn Untouchables	Baseball-Bundesliga	(Germany) Buchholz in der Nordheide
Kevin Trisl	3	P	March 17, 1993 (aged 23)	(Germany) Haar Disciples	Baseball-Bundesliga	(Germany) Munich
Maurice Wilhelm	31	P	October 6, 1987 (aged 28)	(Germany) Bonn Capitals	Baseball-Bundesliga	(Germany) Berlin
Simon Gühring	14	C	July 14, 1983 (aged 32)	(Germany) Heidenheim Heideköpfe	Baseball-Bundesliga	(Germany) Stuttgart
Chris Howard	24	C	February 11, 1989 (aged 27)	(Germany) Regensburg Legionäre	Baseball-Bundesliga	(Germany) Starnberg
Bruce Maxwell	20	C	December 20, 1990 (aged 25)	(United States) Oakland Athletics	Major League Baseball	(Germany) Wiesbaden
Max Boldt	23	IF	September 1, 1988 (aged 27)	(Germany) Mainz Athletics	Baseball-Bundesliga	(Germany) Mainz
Eric Brenk	33	IF	March 22, 1992 (aged 23)	(Germany) Bonn Capitals	Baseball-Bundesliga	(United States) Long Beach, CA
Ludwig Glaser	28	IF	December 19, 1987 (aged 28)	(Germany) Regensburg Legionäre	Baseball-Bundesliga	(Germany) Frankfurt
Lukas Jahn	1	IF	September 29, 1991 (aged 24)	(Germany) Regensburg Legionäre	Baseball-Bundesliga	(Germany) Berlin
Nadir Ljatifi	11	IF	February 21, 1998 (aged 18)	(United States) Cincinnati Reds (minors)	Major League Baseball	(Germany) Dortmund
Christoph Ziegler	12	IF	February 8, 1992 (aged 24)	(Germany) Haar Disciples	Baseball-Bundesliga	(Germany) Füssen
Kevin Kotowski	8	OF	January 5, 1991 (aged 25)	(Germany) Mainz Athletics	Baseball-Bundesliga	(Germany) Frankfurt
Donald Lutz	49	OF	February 6, 1989 (aged 27)	(United States) Cincinnati Reds (minors)	Major League Baseball	(United States) Watertown, NY
Sascha Lutz	32	OF	October 29, 1983 (aged 32)	(Germany) Heidenheim Heideköpfe	Baseball-Bundesliga	(Germany) Friedberg, Hesse
Kent Matthes	22	OF	January 8, 1987 (aged 29)	(United States) Lancaster Barnstormers	Atlantic League	(United States) Florence, SC
Dominique Taylor	44	OF	August 11, 1992 (aged 23)	(United States) Kansas City Royals (minors)	Major League Baseball	(Germany) Frankfurt

=== Nicaragua ===
Manager
(Nicaragua) Marvin Benard
Coaches
(Nicaragua) Cairo Murillo

Player	No.	Pos.	DOB and age	Team	League	Birthplace
Alex Blandino	61	IF	November 6, 1992 (aged 23)			San Jose, California

== Qualifier 3 ==
=== Colombia ===
Manager
(Colombia) (40) Luis Urueta
Coaches
Jolbert Cabrera, (5) Jair Fernández, (33) Néder Horta, (44) Walter Miranda, (16) Édgar Rentería, (7) Luis Sierra

Player	No.	Pos.	DOB and age	Team	League	Birthplace
Horacio Acosta*	30	P	October 24, 1990 (aged 25)	(United States) Normal CornBelters	Frontier League	Miami, Florida
Kendy Batista**	52	P	July 5, 1981 (aged 35)	(Venezuela) Cardenales de Lara	Liga Venezolana de Béisbol	Santa Bárbara, Zulia
Steve Brown**	27	OF	September 3, 1986 (aged 29)	(Colombia) Caimanes de Barranquilla	Liga Colombiana de Béisbol	Barranquilla, Atlántico
Randy Consuegra**	27	P	October 14, 1989 (aged 26)	(Colombia) Caimanes de Barranquilla	Liga Colombiana de Béisbol	Barranquilla, Bolívar
Nabil Crismatt	34	P	December 25, 1994 (aged 21)	(United States) New York Mets (minors)	Major League Baseball	Barranquilla, Atlántico
William Cuevas	63	P	October 14, 1990 (aged 25)	(United States) Detroit Tigers (minors)	Major League Baseball	Turmero, Aragua
Carlos Díaz	50	P	November 18, 1993 (aged 22)	(United States) San Francisco Giants (minors)	Major League Baseball	Monteria, Córdoba
Kevin Escorcia**	64	P	January 5, 1995 (aged 21)	(United States) Chicago White Sox (minors)	Major League Baseball	Barranquilla, Atlántico
Jonathan Escudero	25	P	July 7, 1993 (aged 23)	(United States) St. Louis Cardinals (minors)	Major League Baseball	Cartagena, Bolívar
Dilson Herrera	55	IF	March 3, 1994 (aged 22)	(United States) New York Mets (minors)	Major League Baseball	Cartagena, Bolívar
Ronald Luna	54	IF	August 18, 1992 (aged 24)	(United States) Atlanta Braves (minors)	Liga Colombiana de Béisbol	Cartagena, Bolívar
Yeizer Marrugo**	65	P	January 10, 1994 (aged 22)	(United States) Baltimore Orioles (minors)	Major League Baseball	Cartagena, Bolívar
Luis Martinez	70	C	April 3, 1985 (aged 31)	(United States) Boston Red Sox (minors)	Major League Baseball	Miami, Florida
Charlie Mirabal	43	IF	February 4, 1987 (aged 29)	(United States) Los Angeles Dodgers (minors)	Major League Baseball	Caracas, Distrito Capital
Arismendy Mota	43	P	February 16, 1987 (aged 29)	(United States) Chicago Cubs (minors)	Major League Baseball	Cotui, Sanchez Ramirez Province
Greg Nappo*	14	P	August 25, 1988 (aged 28)	(United States) Miami Marlins (minors)	Major League Baseball	Madison, Connecticut
Dewin Perez**	28	P	September 29, 1994 (aged 21)	(United States) St. Louis Cardinals (minors)	Major League Baseball	Cartagena, Bolívar
Tito Polo	9	OF	August 23, 1994 (aged 22)	(United States) New York Yankees (minors)	Major League Baseball	San Andrés, San Andrés y Providencia
Jesus Posso	32	C	October 5, 1995 (aged 20)	(United States) Philadelphia Phillies (minors)	Major League Baseball	San Antero, Córdoba
Karl Triana	32	P	November 7, 1992 (aged 23)	(Colombia) Leones de Montería	Liga Colombiana de Béisbol	Cartagena, Bolívar

=== France ===
Manager
(Canada) Éric Gagné

=== Panama ===
Manager
Carlos Lee

=== Spain ===
Manager
(Cuba) Manny Crespo

Player	No.	Pos.	DOB and age	Team	League	Birthplace
Daniel Álvarez	20	P	28 June 1996 (aged 19)	(United States) New York Yankees (minors)	Major League Baseball	(Venezuela) Barquisimeto
Rogelio Armenteros	20	P	30 June 1994 (aged 21)	(United States) Houston Astros (minors)	Major League Baseball	(Cuba) Havana
Jorge Balboa	23	P	15 July 1986 (aged 29)	(Spain) CB Barcelona	División de Honor	(Spain) San Sebastián
Richard Castillo	33	P	11 October 1989 (aged 26)	(United States) Gary SouthShore RailCats	American Association	(Venezuela) Barquisimeto
José Cruz	45	P	4 September 1984 (aged 31)	Free agent		(Dominican Republic) Santo Domingo
Rhiner Cruz	39	P	1 November 1986 (aged 29)	(Mexico) Leones de Yucatán	Mexican League	(Dominican Republic) Santo Domingo
Iván Granados	35	P	30 September 1985 (aged 30)	(Spain) Astros de Valencia	División de Honor	(Venezuela) San Carlos
Ricardo Hernández	37	P	23 January 1988 (aged 28)	(Italy) Rimini Baseball Club	Italian Baseball League	(Venezuela) Caracas
Leslie Nacar	26	P	20 July 1983 (aged 32)	(Spain) Tenerife Marlins	División de Honor	(Venezuela) Libertad
Antonio Noguera	30	P	26 February 1988 (aged 28)	(Venezuela) Tiburones de La Guaira	Venezuelan Baseball League	(Venezuela) Caracas
Andrés Pérez	36	P	8 February 1991 (aged 25)	(Spain) Tenerife Marlins	División de Honor	(Venezuela) San Joaquín
Sergio Pérez	50	P	5 December 1984 (aged 31)	Free agent		(United States) Tampa
Richard Salazar	34	P	6 September 1981 (aged 34)	(United States) Rockland Boulders	Can–Am League	(Venezuela) Caracas
Carlos Sierra	28	P	18 October 1994 (aged 21)	(United States) Houston Astros (minors)	Major League Baseball	(Cuba) Cabaiguán
Iker Franco	43	C	3 March 1981 (aged 35)	(Mexico) Tigres de Quintana Roo	Mexican League	(Mexico) Ensenada
Rolando Meriño	40	C	17 February 1971 (aged 45)	(France) Templiers de Sénart	Division Élite	Santiago de Cuba
Blake Ochoa	10	C	5 September 1985 (aged 30)	(Spain) Astros de Valencia	División de Honor	(Venezuela) Maracay
Oscar Angulo	8	IF	1 February 1984 (aged 32)	(Spain) Astros de Valencia	División de Honor	(Venezuela) Barquisimeto
Jesús Golindano	19	IF	13 January 1984 (aged 32)	(Spain) CBS Sant Boi	División de Honor	(Venezuela) Maturín
Luis Guillorme	13	IF	27 September 1994 (aged 21)	(United States) New York Mets (minors)	Major League Baseball	(Venezuela) Caracas
Jesús Merchán	16	IF	26 March 1981 (aged 34)	(Canada) Trois-Rivières Aigles	Can–Am League	(Venezuela) Maracay
Yunesky Sánchez	22	IF	3 March 1984 (aged 32)	(Mexico) Olmecas de Tabasco	Mexican League	(Cuba) Cárdenas
Gabe Suárez	24	IF	14 December 1984 (aged 31)	Free agent		(United States) Denver
Jesús Ustariz	27	IF	26 April 1993 (aged 22)	(Spain) Tenerife Marlins	División de Honor	(Venezuela) Caracas
Engel Beltré	7	OF	1 November 1989 (aged 26)	(Mexico) Piratas de Campeche	Mexican League	(Dominican Republic) Santo Domingo
Lesther Galván	14	OF	10 April 1990 (aged 25)	(Spain) Tenerife Marlins	División de Honor	(Venezuela) Caracas
Yasser Gómez	5	OF	1 April 1980 (aged 35)	Free agent		(Cuba) Havana
Daniel Martínez	9	OF	3 July 1987 (aged 28)	(Spain) CBS Sant Boi	División de Honor	(Venezuela) Caracas

== Qualifier 4 ==
=== Brazil ===
Manager
(United States) Barry Larkin
Coaches
Tiago Caldeira, (United States) Steve Finley, Marcos Guimarães, (United States) LaTroy Hawkins, Mitsuyoshi Sato

Player	No.	Pos.	DOB and age	Team	League	Birthplace
Edilson Batista	17	P	7 July 1997 (aged 19)	(United States) Boston Red Sox (minors)	Major League Baseball	(Brazil) Marília
Rafael Fernandes	27	P	23 April 1986 (aged 30)	(Brazil) Nippon Blue Jays	Campeonato Brasileiro de Beisebol	(Brazil) Tatuí
Felipe Fukuda	14	P	19 January 1993 (aged 23)	(Brazil) Marília	Campeonato Brasileiro de Beisebol	(Brazil) Bastos
Murilo Gouvea	34	P	15 September 1988 (aged 28)	(Brazil) Atibaia	Campeonato Brasileiro de Beisebol	(Brazil) Atibaia
Hugo Kanabushi	41	P	22 May 1989 (aged 27)	(Japan) Yomiuri Giants (minors)	Nippon Professional Baseball	(Brazil) Maringá
Claudio Matumuto	9	P	3 October 1983 (aged 32)			(Brazil) São Paulo
Felipe Natel	1	P	18 April 1989 (aged 27)	(Japan) Yamaha Baseball Club	Intercity Baseball Tournament	(Brazil) Tatuí
Ernesto Noris	28	P	24 November 1972 (aged 43)	(Brazil) Marília	Campeonato Brasileiro de Beisebol	(Cuba) Havana
Leonardo Oliveira	13	P	21 August 1997 (aged 19)			(Brazil) São Paulo
Eric Pardinho	43	P	5 January 2001 (aged 15)	(Brazil) Nippon Blue Jays	Campeonato Brasileiro de Beisebol	(Brazil) Lucélia
André Rienzo	25	P	5 July 1988 (aged 28)	(United States) Miami Marlins (minors)	Major League Baseball	(Brazil) São Paulo
Bo Takahashi	18	P	23 January 1997 (aged 19)	(United States) Arizona Diamondbacks (minors)	Major League Baseball	(Brazil) Presidente Prudente
Jean Tome	18	P	2 February 1987 (aged 29)	(Brazil) Atibaia	Campeonato Brasileiro de Beisebol	(Brazil) Atibaia
Thyago Vieira	47	P	7 January 1993 (aged 23)	(United States) Seattle Mariners (minors)	Major League Baseball	(Brazil) São Paulo
Luis Camargo	9	C	20 September 1976 (aged 40)	(Italy) Rimini Baseball Club	Italian Baseball League	Brazil
Ángel Luis Cobas	46	C	5 April 1969 (aged 47)	(Brazil) Anhanguera	Campeonato Brasileiro de Beisebol	(Cuba) Guantánamo Province
Luis Paz	15	C	7 May 1996 (aged 20)	(United States) Los Angeles Dodgers (minors)	Major League Baseball	(Brazil) Marília
Bo Bichette	5	IF	5 March 1998 (aged 18)	(United States) Toronto Blue Jays (minors)	Major League Baseball	(United States) Orlando, Florida
Dante Bichette Jr.	19	IF	26 September 1992 (aged 23)	(United States) New York Yankees (minors)	Major League Baseball	(United States) Orlando, Florida
Carlos Garmendia	10	IF	23 June 1993 (aged 23)			(United States) Miami
Vítor Ito	6	IF	16 February 1995 (aged 21)	(Japan) Kyoei University		(Brazil) Marília
Leonardo Reginatto	20	IF	10 April 1990 (aged 25)	(United States) Minnesota Twins (minors)	Major League Baseball	(Brazil) Curitiba
Lucas Rojo	4	IF	5 April 1994 (aged 21)	(Brazil) Atibaia	Campeonato Brasileiro de Beisebol	(Brazil) Ibiúna
Reinaldo Sato	36	IF	25 October 1980 (aged 35)	(Japan) Yamaha Baseball Club	Intercity Baseball Tournament	(Brazil) Mogi das Cruzes
Irait Chirino	22	OF	1 August 1984 (aged 32)	(Brazil) São Paulo	Campeonato Brasileiro de Beisebol	(Cuba) Havana
Luciano Fernando	7	OF	13 April 1992 (aged 24)	(Japan) Tohoku Rakuten Golden Eagles	Nippon Professional Baseball	(Brazil) Miranda
Gabriel Maciel	37	OF	10 January 1999 (aged 17)	(United States) Arizona Diamondbacks (minors)	Major League Baseball	(Brazil) Londrina
J. C. Muñiz	29	OF	28 January 1976 (aged 40)	(Brazil) Marília	Campeonato Brasileiro de Beisebol	(Cuba) Havana

=== Great Britain ===
Manager
(United Kingdom) Liam Carroll
Coaches

Player	No.	Pos.	DOB and age	Team	League	Birthplace
Zach Graefser	26	Pitching Coach				
Bradley Marcelino	18	First Base Coach	February 27, 1982 (age 44)			
Bill Percy	24	Third Base Coach				
Mike Nickeas	31	Bench Coach	February 13, 1983 (age 43)			
Trevor Hoffman	51	Bullpen Coach	October 13, 1967 (age 58)	San Diego Padres	MLB	Bellflower, CA

Player	No.	Pos.	DOB and age	Team	League	Birthplace
Nolan Bond	9	P	November 16, 1996 (age 29)	University of Houston		Fife, Scotland
Cody Chartrand	15	P	September 26, 1991 (age 34)	Texas Rangers	AZL Rookie league	Nanaimo, BC, Canada
Daniel Cooper	33	P	November 6, 1986 (age 39)	University of Southern California		New Port Beach, California
Chris Reed	29	P	May 20, 1990 (age 35)	Miami Marlins	MLB	London, England
Jordan Edmonds	11	P	July 15, 1995 (age 30)	Quinsigamond Community College		West Essex, U.K
Vaughn Harris	13	P	June 10, 1981 (age 44)	Sydney Blue Sox	Australian Baseball League	Manly, Australia
Greg Hendrix	32	P	February 17, 1988 (age 38)	Windsor Royals	Queensland League	Atlanta, Georgia
Paul Kirkpatrick	28	P	May 9, 1996 (age 29)	Western Kentucky U		London, England
Ali Knowles	1	P	June 22, 1990 (age 35)	Troy University		Freeport, Bahamas
Spencer Kreisberg	21	P	May 21, 1987 (age 38)	Karlskoga Bats	Swedish Elitserian	Long Beach, California
Rei Martinez	5	P	May 14, 1992 (age 33)	Southampton Mustang	British Baseball League	Moron, Ciego de Avila, Cuba
Michael Roth	29	P	February 15, 1990 (age 36)	Texas Rangers	MLB	Greenville, SC
Blake Taylor	45	P	August 17, 1995 (age 30)	Syracuse Mets	MiLB	Orange, CA
Nateshon Thomas	8	P	May 25, 1988 (age 37)	Bad Homburg Hornets	Germany	Tortola, British Virgin Islands
