= Marek Chlup =

Czech baseball player (born 1999)

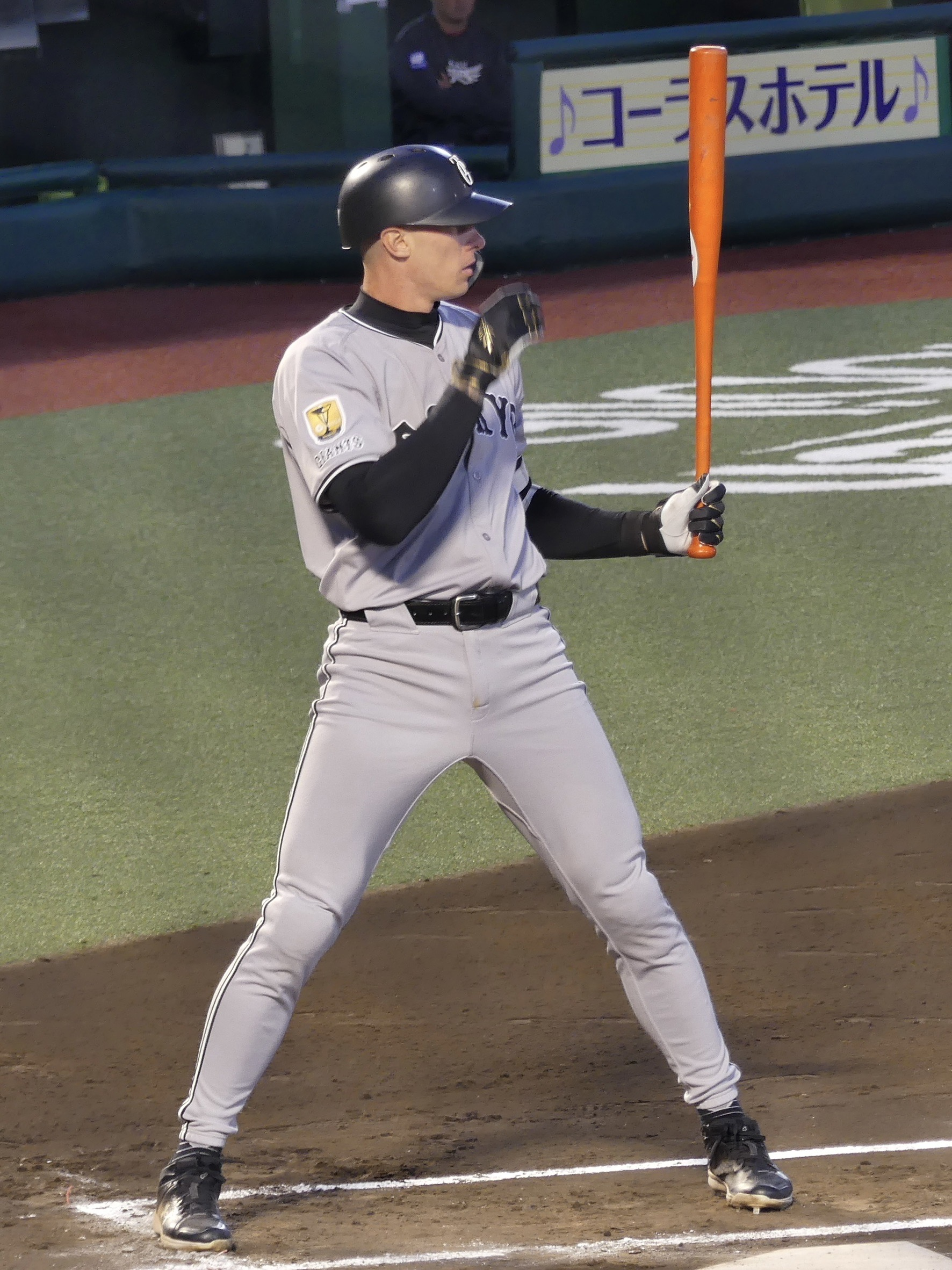
- Chlup with the Yomiuri Giants

Free agent
- Outfielder
- Born: January 9, 1999 (age 27); Český Dub, Czech Republic
- Bats: Right Throws: Right

NPB debut
- July 12, 2025, for the Yomiuri Giants

NPB statistics (through 2025 season)
- Batting average: .000
- Home runs: 0
- Runs batted in: 0
- Stats at Baseball Reference

Teams
- Yomiuri Giants (2025)

Marek Chlup (born January 9, 1999) is a Czech professional baseball outfielder who is a free agent. He has previously played in Nippon Professional Baseball (NPB) for the Yomiuri Giants and in the Mexican Baseball League. He also represents the Czech Republic national team.

== Playing career ==
=== Early career ===
Chlup made his professional debut in 2014 with the Arrows Ostrava of the Czech Baseball Extraliga. Following the 2015 season, he moved to the Eagles Praha. Chlup was a member of Praha through the 2023 season, including while he was in college.

=== College ===
Chlup committed to the North Carolina State University for college baseball, playing his freshman and sophomore seasons with the Wolfpack. He transferred to North Greenville University for his junior season, the year the team won the NCAA Division II national championship in 2022. In their 2022 championship season, Chlup hit .390 with 12 home runs and 75 RBI for the Crusaders. He was named the Conference Carolinas Player of the Year for 2022.

=== Lake Country Dockhounds ===
On July 31, 2023, Chlup signed with the Lake Country DockHounds of the American Association of Professional Baseball. In 34 games with the DockHounds in 2023, he batted .325/.393/.627 with nine home runs, 25 RBI, and six stolen bases. Chlup signed an extension with the DockHounds on January 2, 2024. Prior to the 2024 season, his Extraliga rights were transferred by the Eagles Praha to Tempo Praha, after which he appeared briefly with Tempo while tuning up for the 2024 American Association season. On August 7, Chlup, Lake Country shortstop Demetrius Sims, and team broadcaster Dominic Stearn witnessed a bicycle accident near Falls Park, and cared for the victims until paramedics arrived.

=== Yomiuri Giants ===
On September 25, 2024, it was announced that Chlup had signed a one–year developmental contract with the Yomiuri Giants of Nippon Professional Baseball. Chlup made his debut with the Giants on July 12, 2025. He became the first European-born and developed position player in NPB history. He also became the first Czech-born baseball player in a major professional league since Frank Rooney (Rovný) of the 1914 Indianapolis Hoosiers. After appearing in just two games, Chlup was diagnosed with a left hamate fracture on July 16. Before his season-ending injury, he went hitless in five at-bats over two games. On October 28, the Giants announced that they would not be retaining Chlup for the 2026 season.

=== Caliente de Durango ===
On May 16, 2026, Chlup signed with the Caliente de Durango of the Mexican League. In eight appearances for the Caliente, he batted .250/.273/.406 with one home run and eight RBI. On June 5, Chlup was released by Durango.

== International career ==
Chlup represents the Czech Republic national baseball team in international competition. During the qualifiers for the 2023 World Baseball Classic, Chlup hit .353/.353/.706 with two home runs and four RBI to help the Czech Republic qualify for its first ever WBC tournament. In the main tournament, Chlup hit .333/.471/.417, one of the best offensive producers on the 2023 Czech team alongside Eric Sogard and Matěj Menšík. During the game against Japan, Chlup hit a double off Rōki Sasaki and later scored to give the Czechs a brief lead.

Chlup was selected to the Team Europe roster for the Global Baseball Games exhibition tournament against Samurai Japan, ahead of the 2024 WBSC Premier12.
