= Jantzen Witte =

American baseball player (born 1990)

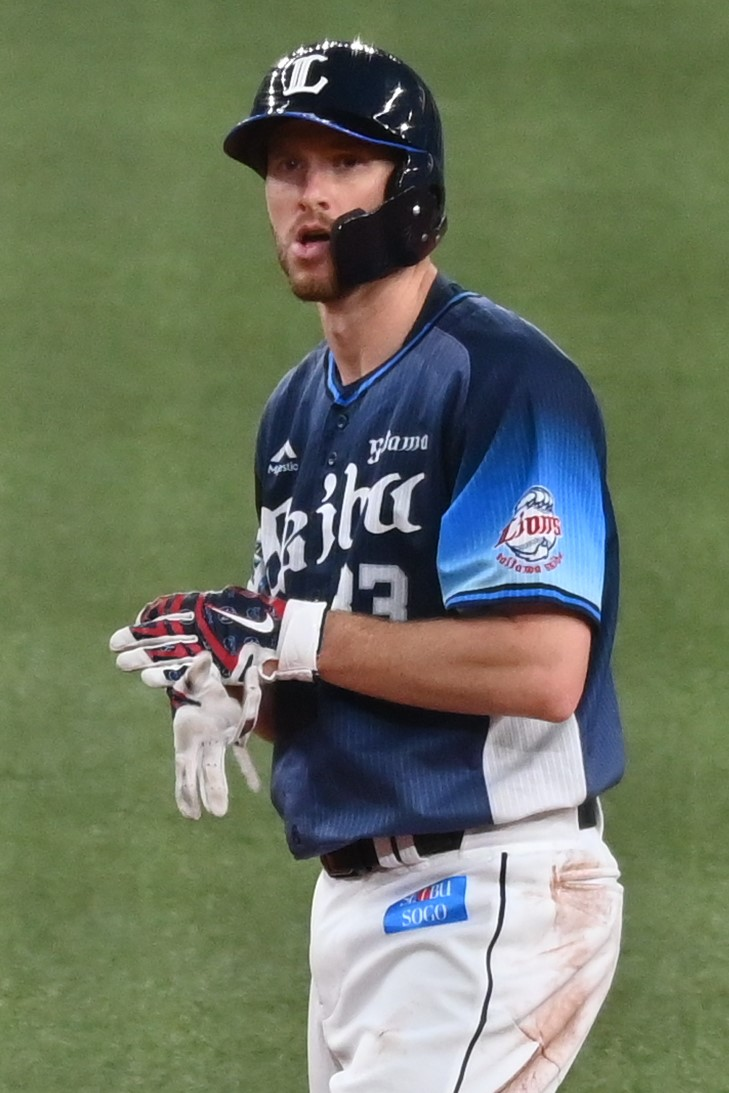
- Witte with the Saitama Seibu Lions

Sokol Hluboká
- Infielder
- Born: January 4, 1990 (age 36); Fort Worth, Texas
- Bats: Right Throws: Right

NPB debut
- March 31, 2022, for the Saitama Seibu Lions

NPB statistics (through 2022 season)
- Batting average: .192
- Home runs: 2
- RBI: 13
- Stats at Baseball Reference

Teams
- Saitama Seibu Lions (2022)

Jantzen Connery Witte (born January 4, 1990) is an American professional baseball infielder for the Sokol Hluboká of the Czech Baseball Extraliga. Listed at 6 feet 2 inches (1.88 m) and 195 pounds (88 kg), he bats and throws right-handed. He has previously played in Nippon Professional Baseball (NPB) for the Saitama Seibu Lions.

== Career ==
=== Early career ===
Witte, who started playing baseball at three years old, also played tennis from when he was six until his freshman year of high school. As a result, he has been described as possessing an unusual swing that is a byproduct of his tennis background. At the field, he has a solid-average defensive profile and good glove work at both first base and third base. Witte graduated from James W. Martin High School in Arlington, Texas.

=== Boston Red Sox ===
The Red Sox selected Witte in the 24th round of the 2013 MLB draft out of Texas Christian University, where he played four seasons for the TCU Horned Frogs baseball squad during 2010–2013. During this period, he was a member of three TCU conference champion teams and a tournament championship title. In 2012, he earned Academic All-Mountain West and second-team All-Conference honors. In 2013, he was named Big 12 co-scholar Athlete of the Year, second-Team All-Big 12, and first-team Academic All-Big 12 as a senior, after starting all 57 of the Horned Frogs' games, hitting .293 (61-for-208) with 15 doubles, two triples, three home runs, and 34 RBI.

In his 2013 professional debut season, Witte hit a combined .168 batting average in 33 games for the rookie class GCL Red Sox and the Low–A Lowell Spinners. He improved considerably with the Single–A Greenville Drive in 2014, hitting a .330/.418/.554 slash line with a .972 OPS in 65 games, earning a selection to the South Atlantic League All-Star team. He finished the year with the High–A Salem Red Sox, where he slashed .296/.340/.451 in 65 games.

In 2015, Witte slashed .283/.363/.414 for the Double-A Portland Sea Dogs in 85 games, and was named to the Eastern League All-Star team. Witte opened 2016 at Portland, where he appeared in 11 games, batting .359 with two home runs and seven RBIs. He was promoted to the Triple-A Pawtucket Red Sox in April, where he hit .258 with two home runs and 25 RBIs in 100 regular season games.

Witte again played for Pawtucket in 2017, batting .242 with three home runs and 24 RBIs in 80 games played; he missed nearly four weeks starting in late July due to a strained left calf. Witte spent time during 2018 with both Portland and Pawtucket, appearing in a total of 104 games while batting .270 with 12 home runs and 63 RBIs.

Witte started 2019 with Portland, then was assigned to Pawtucket in mid-April. Overall with both teams, he appeared in 118 games while batting .271 with nine home runs and 51 RBIs. After the season, Witte played in the Puerto Rican Winter League. In December 2019, the Red Sox included Witte on a list of non-roster invitees to spring training. Witte did not play in a game in 2020 due to the cancellation of the minor league season because of the COVID-19 pandemic. On November 2, Witte elected free agency.

=== Seattle Mariners ===
On January 8, 2021, Witte signed a minor league contract with the Seattle Mariners. Witte spent the 2021 season with the Triple-A Tacoma Rainiers. He played in 105 games for the Rainiers, hitting .299 with 19 home runs and 70 RBIs. On November 7, 2021, Witte elected free agency.

=== Saitama Seibu Lions ===
On January 1, 2022, Witte signed with the Saitama Seibu Lions of Nippon Professional Baseball. Witte played in 35 games for the Lions, but struggled to a .192/.227/.283 slash with 2 home runs and 13 RBI. He became a free agent following the 2022 season.

=== San Diego Padres ===
On January 25, 2023, Witte signed a minor league contract with the San Diego Padres organization. In 106 games for the Triple–A El Paso Chihuahuas, he batted .253/.324/.460 with 17 home runs, 80 RBI, and 7 stolen bases. Witte elected free agency following the season on November 6.

=== Texas Rangers ===
On March 4, 2024, Witte signed with the Cleburne Railroaders of the American Association of Professional Baseball. However, before the season, on April 9, the Texas Rangers organization purchased his contract. In 47 games for the Triple–A Round Rock Express, he batted .238/.331/.431 with seven home runs and 26 RBI. Witte was released by the Rangers organization on June 27.

=== Sokol Hluboká ===
After having previously suggesting he was going to retire, Witte announced a desire to play baseball in Europe in 2025, and that he was in the process of obtaining EU citizenship. On January 21, 2025, he signed with the Sokol Hluboká of the Czech Baseball Extraliga.
