= Greg Nappo =

American baseball player (born 1988)

- Pitcher
- Born: August 25, 1988 (age 38); Madison, Connecticut, U.S.
- Bats: Left Throws: Left
- Stats at Baseball Reference

Gregory Nappo (born August 25, 1988) is an American former professional baseball pitcher.

== Career ==
=== Florida / Miami Marlins ===
Nappo was born in Manhattan, New York and attended Daniel Hand High School. He pitched for the University of Connecticut in 2007 and from 2009 to 2011, posting respective records and ERAs of 4–3, 3.50; 3–4, 6.06; 8–5, 4.44; and 10–2, 2.55. The Florida Marlins drafted Nappo in the 18th round (553rd overall) of the 2011 Major League Baseball draft. He played for the Low-A Jamestown Jammers and Single-A Greensboro Grasshoppers in 2011, going 4–1 with a 3.44 ERA, 58 strikeouts, and a 1.055 WHIP in 55 innings; he averaged 9.5 strikeouts per nine innings. In 2012, with Greensboro, Nappo was 2–2 with a 2.77 ERA in 40 games, striking out 103 batters in 78 innings of work. On April 24 of that year, he took part in a no-hitter against the Hickory Crawdads, relieving pitcher Jose Fernández. His WHIP was 1.051. He was a South Atlantic League Mid-Season All-Star that year.

In 2013, Nappo made 38 appearances split between the High-A Jupiter Hammerheads and Triple-A New Orleans Zephyrs, pitching to a combined 5-1 record and 1.11 ERA with 56 strikeouts over 57 innings of work. Nappo split the 2014 campaign between the Double-A Jacksonville Suns and New Orleans, compiling a 3–0 record and 2.42 ERA with 44 strikeouts and a 0.929 WHIP. He returned to Jacksonville and New Orleans in 2015 and was 5–3 with a 2.49 ERA, averaging more than a strikeout per inning and posting a 1.031 WHIP.

Nappo began 2016 with New Orleans, recording a 5-6 record and 4.63 ERA with 60 strikeouts in 68 innings pitched across 26 appearances. He played for the Colombia national baseball team in the 2017 World Baseball Classic qualifiers. On June 19, 2017, Nappo was released by the Marlins, having worked to an 0-2 record and 3.57 ERA with 22 strikeouts in 16 games split between Jacksonville and New Orleans.

=== New Britain Bees ===
On July 8, 2017, Nappo signed with the New Britain Bees of the Atlantic League of Professional Baseball. In 14 appearances (12 starts) for the Bees, he compiled a 3-2 record and 3.97 ERA with 49 strikeouts over 68 innings of work. Nappo became a free agent following the season.

On September 1, 2018, Nappo re-signed with New Britain. In one start for the team, he took the loss after allowing two runs on six hits with two strikeouts over five innings innings. Nappo was released by the Bees the following day.
