= Martin Červenka =

Czech baseball player (born 1992)

Kotlářka Praha – No. 13
- Catcher
- Born: 3 August 1992 (age 34); Prague, Czechoslovakia
- Bats: Right Throws: Right
- Stats at Baseball Reference
Medals
Men's baseball
Representing Czech Republic
European Championship
Bronze medal – third place	2025 Rotterdam	Team

Martin Červenka (born 3 August 1992) is a Czech professional baseball catcher for Kotlářka Praha of the Czech Baseball Extraliga. He has previously played in Minor League Baseball for ten seasons and for the Czech Republic national baseball team in international competitions, such as the 2019 European Baseball Championship and 2023 World Baseball Classic.

== Career ==
=== Cleveland Indians ===
Červenka played in Extraliga when he was 15 years old. He trained at the European Baseball Academy at age 16. He signed with the Cleveland Indians in January 2009, and participated in extended spring training in 2009 and 2010, while finishing high school. He made his professional debut in 2011 in for the Arizona Indians of the Rookie-level Arizona League, batting .164/.233/.218 in 55 at bats.

The next season for the Arizona League team, Červenka batted .240/.352/.280 in 75 at bats. In 2013, playing for the Low–A Mahoning Valley Scrappers and Single–A Lake County Captains, he batted .185/.271/.221 in 195 at bats. In 2014, playing with Mahoning Valley he batted .181/.250/217 in 83 at–bats. In 2015, playing in Lake County he batted .184/.233/.247 in 174 at–bats. In 2016, playing for two minor league teams he batted .272/.332/.383 in 342 at bats. In 2017, playing for the High–A Lynchburg Hillcats, he batted .278/.343/.418 in 400 at–bats. He elected free agency following the season on November 6, 2017.

=== Baltimore Orioles ===
On 20 November 2017, Červenka signed a minor league contract with the San Francisco Giants organization. On 14 December, he was selected by the Baltimore Orioles in the minor league phase of the Rule 5 draft. In 2018, he played in 97 games for the Double–A Bowie Baysox, he batted .258/.317/.457 in 337 at bats, hitting a career-high 15 home runs (tied for 8th in the Eastern League) and 60 runs batted in (RBIs).

In 2019, he batted .233/.304/.324 in aggregate for the High–A Aberdeen IronBirds, Double–A Bowie, and the Triple–A Norfolk Tides. His stint with Norfolk marked the first time he reached Triple–A. Červenka did not play in a game in 2020 due to the cancellation of the minor league season because of the COVID-19 pandemic. He became a free agent following the year on 2 November 2020.

=== New York Mets ===
On 22 March 2021, Červenka signed a minor league contract with the New York Mets organization. He played in 72 games for the Triple–A Syracuse Mets, batting .183/.280/.344 with seven home runs and 19 RBI. Červenka elected free agency following the season on 7 November.

=== Eagles Praha ===
On 9 February 2022, Červenka signed with the Eagles Praha of the Czech Baseball Extraliga. In 43 appearances for the Eagles, Červenka batted .424/.548/.821 with 15 home runs and 49 RBI.

=== Hroši Brno ===
On 24 February 2024, Červenka signed with the Hroši Brno of the Czech Baseball Extraliga. In 44 appearances for the team, Červenka slashed .321/.447/.541 with seven home runs and 35 RBI.

=== Kotlářka Praha ===
On 12 December 2024, Červenka signed with Kotlářka Praha of the Czech Baseball Extraliga. He won the 2025 Extraliga Sports Journalist Award.

== International career ==
Červenka has played for the Czech Republic national baseball team at the 2012 European Baseball Championship, 2013 World Baseball Classic Qualification, 2014 European Baseball Championship, 2015 USA Tour, 2017 World Baseball Classic Qualification, and 2016 European Baseball Championship. He played for the team at the Africa/Europe 2020 Olympic Qualification tournament, in Italy in September 2019.

In 2022, Červenka was selected to play the 2023 World Baseball Classic qualification. He played for the national team in the 2023 World Baseball Classic.

== Personal life ==
Červenka's father, Filip, and older brother, Marek, also play baseball. Červenka completed an undergraduate degree and expected to complete his Master of Business Administration in 2018.

== See also ==
- Rule 5 draft results
