= Marek Minařík =

Czech baseball player (born 1993)

Sokol Hluboká
- Pitcher
- Born: 28 June 1993 (age 32); Louny, Czech Republic
- Bats: Right Throws: Right
- Stats at Baseball Reference

Marek Minařík (born 28 June 1993) is a Czech professional baseball pitcher for the Sokol Hluboká of the Czech Baseball Extraliga. He has previously played for the Philadelphia Phillies and Pittsburgh Pirates organizations. He has also represented the Czech Republic.

== Career ==
=== Philadelphia Phillies ===
On May 18, 2010, Minařík signed with the Philadelphia Phillies organization as an international free agent. Minařík played for the rookie–level Gulf Coast League Phillies in 2011, going 0–0 with a 6.00 earned run average (ERA) in three inning pitched. He returned to the GCL Phillies in 2012, he went 1–0 with a 2.65 ERA and 11 strikeouts in 17 innings.

=== Pittsburgh Pirates ===
On November 22, 2013, Minařík signed a minor league contract with the Pittsburgh Pirates. In 2014, pitching for the rookie–level Bristol Pirates and Low–A Jamestown Jammers, he was a combined 1–6 with a 5.06 ERA and 31 strikeouts across 53 1/3 innings pitched.

In 2015, pitching for Bristol, Minařík was 2–6 with a 6.32 ERA and 39 strikeouts over 52 2/3 innings of work. He was released by the Pirates organization on November 11, 2015.

=== Tempo Praha ===
Following his release from the Pirates organization, Minařík signed with the Tempo Praha of the Czech Baseball Extraliga.

On 3 July 2021, Minařík threw a no-hitter against Hroši Brno, recording 12 strikeouts and four walks.

=== Sokol Hluboká ===
On 15 December 2024, Minařík signed with Sokol Hluboká of the Czech Baseball Extraliga.

== International career ==
He was selected for the Czech Republic national baseball team at the 2012 European Baseball Championship, 2013 World Baseball Classic Qualification, 2014 European Baseball Championship, 2015 USA Tour, 2017 World Baseball Classic Qualification, and 2016 European Baseball Championship. He played for the team at the Africa/Europe 2020 Olympic Qualification tournament, in Italy in September 2019. He played for Team Czech Republic in the 2019 European Baseball Championship.

In 2022, Minařík was selected to play the 2023 World Baseball Classic qualification, where he recorded one win against China. He was also part of the Czech squad at the 2023 European Baseball Championship.
