= Luciano Fernando =

Brazilian baseball player

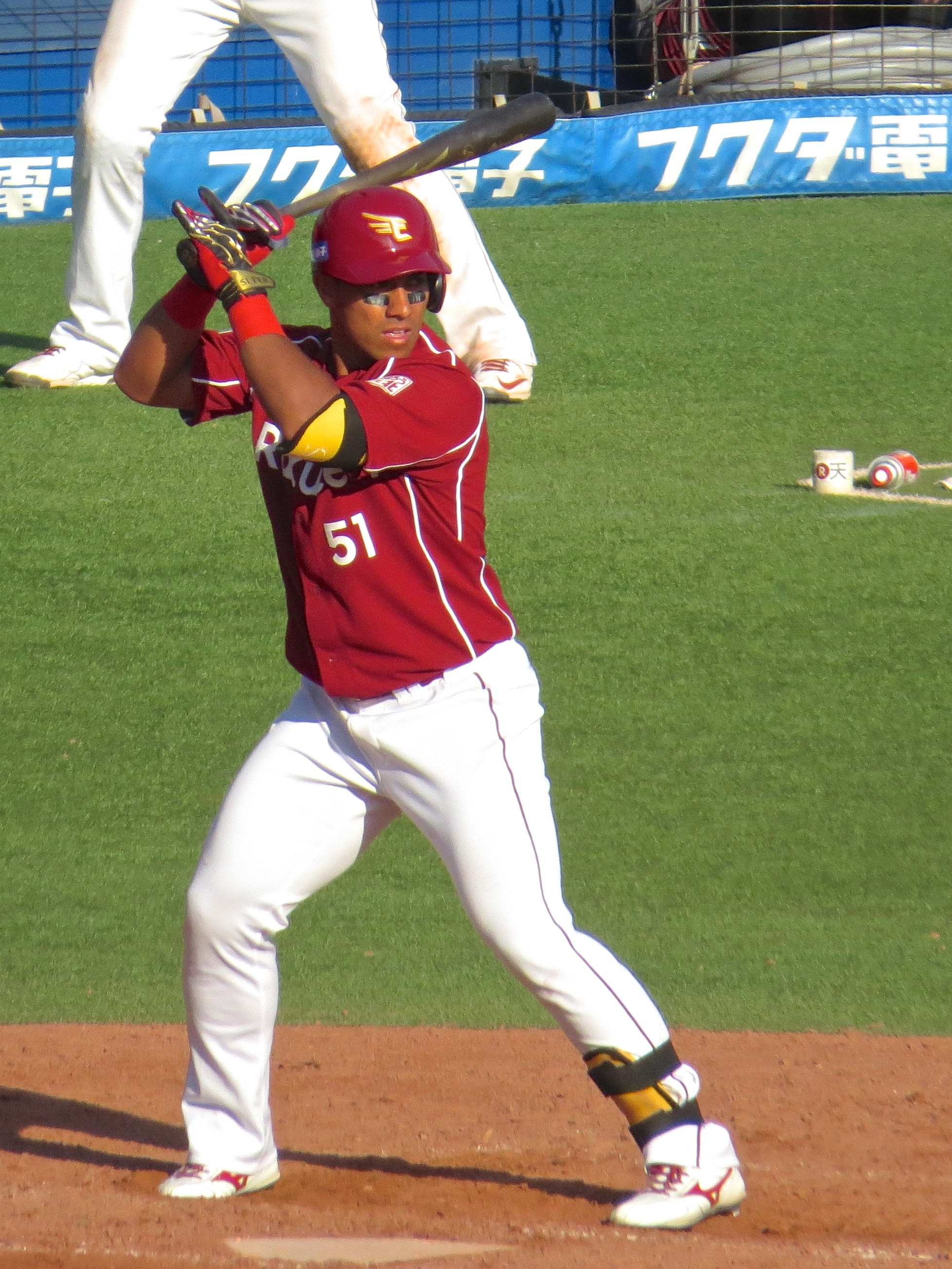
- Fernando with the Tohoku Rakuten Golden Eagles
- Outfielder
- Born: April 13, 1992 (age 33); Miranda, Mato Grosso do Sul, Brazil
- Batted: Right Threw: Right

NPB debut
- April 19, 2015, for the Tohoku Rakuten Golden Eagles

Last NPB appearance
- 2019, for the Tohoku Rakuten Golden Eagles

NPB statistics
- Batting average: .201
- Home runs: 1
- RBI: 14
- Stats at Baseball Reference

Teams
- Tohoku Rakuten Golden Eagles (2015–2020)

Luciano Fernando (born April 13, 1992) is a Brazilian former professional baseball outfielder. He has played in Nippon Professional Baseball (NPB) for the Tohoku Rakuten Golden Eagles. He has also played for the Brazil national team.

In 2017, he joined the Venados de Mazatlán in Mexico, becoming the first Brazilian player in Mexican Pacific League history.

== Early life ==
Born in Brazil, Fernando moved to Japan with his family at the age of five. He initially dreamed of being a professional footballer, but began playing baseball in Japan.

== Career ==
=== Tohoku Rakuten Golden Eagles ===
Tohoku Rakuten Golden Eagles selected Fernando with the ? selection in the 2014 NPB draft. On April 19, 2015, Fernando made his NPB debut. On December 2, 2020, Fernando became a free agent. In 72 total games spanning parts of five seasons, he batted .201/.248/.252 with one home run and 14 RBI.

=== Saitama Musashi Heat Bears ===
Fernando signed with the Saitama Musashi Heat Bears of the Baseball Challenge League for the 2021 season. He re–signed with the club for the 2022 season.

== International career ==
Fernando represented the Brazil national team in World Baseball Classic (WBC) qualifiers in 2017 and 2023.
