= TJ Tempo Praha =

Czech baseball club

Tempo Praha
Team logo
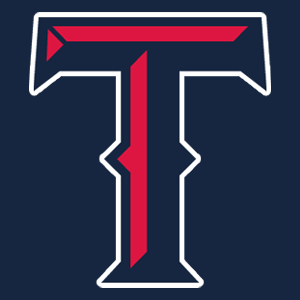
Cap insignia

Information
- League: Czech Extraliga
- Location: Prague, Czech Republic
- Ballpark: Baseballový a softballový areál TJ Tempo Praha
- Established: 1963; 62 years ago
- Colors: Navy blue, red and white

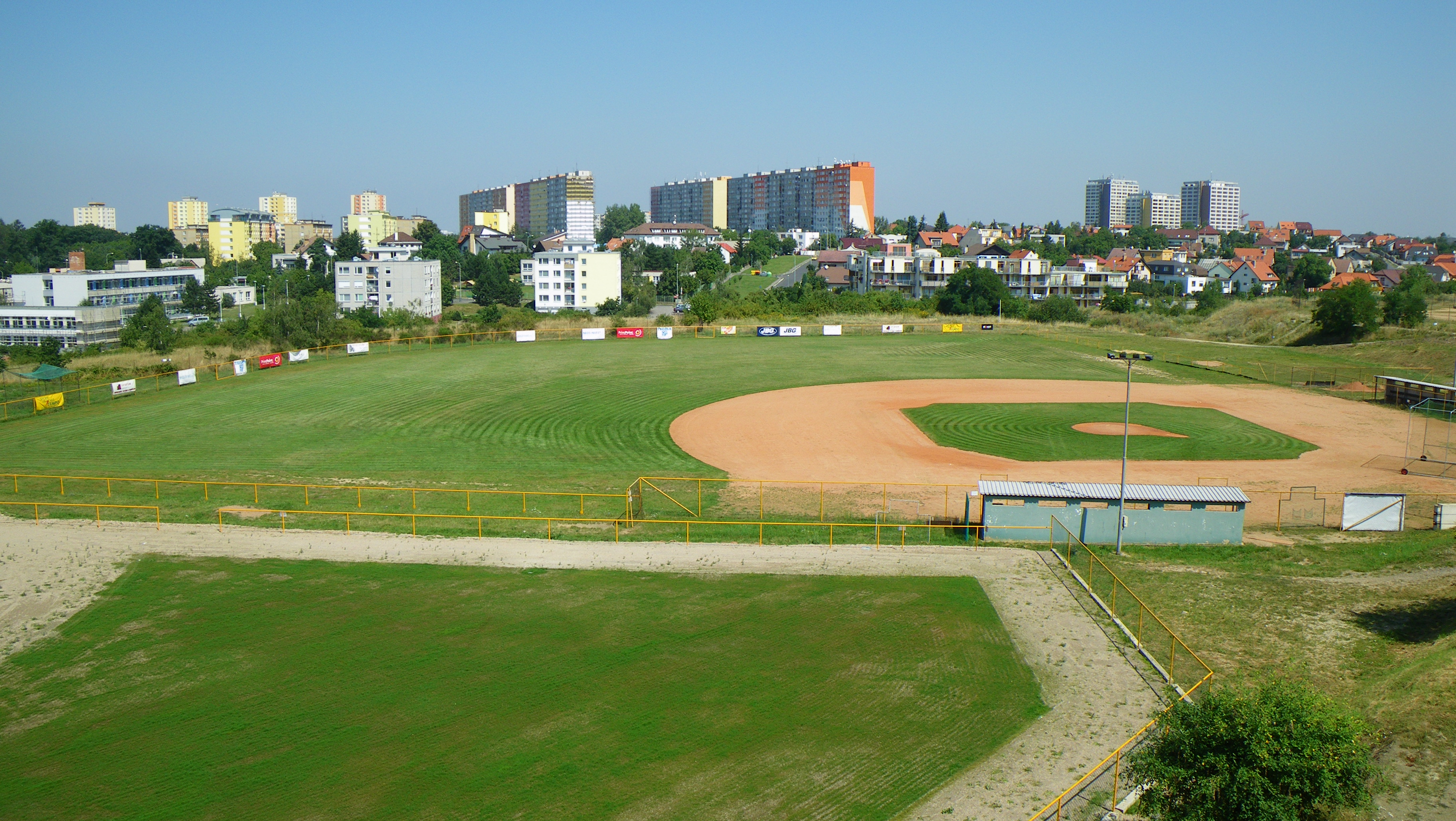
Tempo Praha ballpark

Tempo Praha is a professional baseball club in the Czech Republic, which has changed its name in recent years. While initial founding of the club dates back to 1963, the club in its current standing was founded in 2001 by joining two former baseball clubs VSK Tegola Chemie Praha and Tempo Praha. Since the 2005 season, the club has played under the name Tempo Titans Praha, and through the 2008 season, the club played in the Extraliga under the name of their general partner, Tegola Titans Praha. In 2009, the A team finished last in the Extraliga, then lost in relegation series to drop to the second division after 17 seasons of participating in the Extraliga. Over its 17 seasons in the Extraliga, the club posted an overall regular season record of 227–250.

== Teams & competitions ==
Category	Competition	Head coach
seniors A	Českomoravská League	Joey Kamide
seniors B	Senior Regional League	Luboš Čuhel
seniors C	Senior Regional League	Jan Čížek
U16	Regional League U16	Luboš Čuhel
U14	Regional League U14	Vladimír Jarošík
U12	Regional League U12	Michal Nevěřil
U10	Regional League U10	Ivan Nevěřil
rookies	Regional League U10	Robert Medřický

== A team standings in competitions ==
Year	Competition	Finish	Regular Season
2012	Českomoravská liga	1st place	19–3
2011	Českomoravská liga	2nd place	16–6
2010	Českomoravská liga	2nd place	16–6
2009	Extraliga	8th place	6–29
2008	Extraliga	7th place	11–17
2007	Extraliga	7th place	6–22
2006	Extraliga	6th place	14–21
2005	Extraliga	6th place	13–22
2004	Extraliga	3rd place	14–16
2003	Extraliga	2nd place	25–5
2002	Extraliga	3rd place	17–16
2001	Extraliga	6th place	13–17
2000	Extraliga	2nd division	13–17
1999	Extraliga	2nd division	15–8

== Roster ==
Tempo Praha roster – Extraliga 2021
Players		Coaches
Pitchers: 13 Marek Minařík; 42 Jake Rabinowitz; 11 Ondřej Vank; 14 Joey Wagman; 46 Lubomír Čuhel	Catchers: 27 Kryštof Lukavský; 23 Phillip Steering; 9 Petr Šusta; 38 Martin Zelenka; Infielders: 3 Vojtěch Bečka; 50 Viktor Hluchý; 66 David Nevěřil; 37 Matěj Pláteník; 71 David Bohánka; 30 Michal Zelenka; Outfielders: 7 Matěj Bužga; 88 Marián Mikš; 5 Aleš Nepomucký; 20 Nicolas O'Rourke; Designated hitters: 10 Marek Rejman	Manager: Lubomír Čuhel; Coaches: Radovan Bušovský (first base); Aleš Posselt (third base); Ivan Mašek (assistant)

== Highlights ==
- Winner of Czech Baseball Cup: 1994
- Czech Extraliga vice champion: 1994, 2003
- Českomoravská liga champions: 2012
