= Campeonato Brasileiro de Beisebol =

Brazilian baseball competition

- Sport: Baseball
- Founded: 1936; 90 years ago
- First season: 1936
- No. of teams: 12
- Country: Brazil
- Most recent champions: Dourados (1st title)
- Most titles: Nippon Blue Jays (12 titles)

The Campeonato Brasileiro de Beisebol (English: "Brazilian Baseball Championship") is the top-level baseball tournament in Brazil. It is organized by the Brazilian Baseball and Softball Confederation (CBBS) and as of 2023 it is contested by eleven teams. The championship was first played in 1936 and has been played nonstop, except for the 2020 season, when it was cancelled due to the COVID-19 pandemic. All of the clubs are based in the southeastern states of São Paulo and Paraná.

The round-robin tournament consists of two rounds. In the first stage (the Fase Inicial), usually played in July, teams are divided into four groups. The top two teams in each group move on to the final round (Fase Final), usually contested in August.

The most recent champions are the 2025 winners, Dourados FA. The top five teams in the Fase Final qualify for the Taça Brasil ("Brazilian Cup"), a separate competition which is played later in the year.

== History ==
Baseball was introduced to Brazil by Japanese immigrants in the early 20th century, who largely settled in agricultural communities around São Paulo. The first Brazilian baseball championship was held in São Paulo in 1936. The original four teams were Bastos (now GECEBS), Tietê, Paraguaçu Paulista and São Paulo; Colônia Aliança entered the next year. The tournament was sponsored by Jornal Nippak, a Japanese-Brazilian newspaper. During this early period, non-Japanese "westerners" were generally excluded from playing. However, repression against Japanese cultural associations during World War II saw the tournament temporarily cease operations.

The tournament was reorganized by Olímpio da Silva e Sá, a sportswriter with A Gazeta Esportiva, who founded the São Paulo Baseball and Softball Federation on September 24, 1946. The first game of the resurrected Campeonato was held on May 11, 1947, with Sylvio de Magalhães Padilha throwing out the first pitch. The Estádio Municipal de Beisebol Mie Nishi was opened in São Paulo in 1958, inaugurated by state governor Ademar de Barros, as well as Japanese Princess Mikasa and the Waseda University baseball team from Tokyo. The league thrived in the 1960s and 1970s, as Japanese companies doing business in Brazil sponsored successful club teams like Howa, Kanebo, Toshiba, and Mizuho Bank.

Due to its origins, Brazilian baseball is thought to have more in common with the Japanese style of play rather than baseball in the United States; this is reflected in prioritizing "small ball" over power hits and home runs. However, this has changed in recent decades with influence from the baseball-playing nations of the Caribbean, as well as the experience of Brazilian players in affiliated baseball.

== Current teams ==
Though the different teams represent different communities, all of the games are played in three ballparks in the states of São Paulo and Paraná: Anhanguera Nikkei Clube (in Santana de Parnaíba), the Centro de Treinamento CBBS/Yakult (in Ibiúna), and the Estádio Municipal de Beisebol e Softbol (in Curitiba).

Team	Represents	Stadium
Atibaia	(São Paulo (state)) Atibaia, São Paulo	Anhanguera Nikkei Clube
Gecebs (Note: Officially Grêmio Assistencial e Cultural)	(São Paulo (state)) Arujá, São Paulo	Anhanguera Nikkei Clube
Nippon Blue Jays	(São Paulo (state)) Arujá, São Paulo	Anhanguera Nikkei Clube
Dourados FA	Dourados, Mato Grosso do Sul	Beisebol Dourados MS
Ibiúna	(São Paulo (state)) Ibiúna, São Paulo	Centro de Treinamento CBBS/Yakult, Ibiúna
Marília	(São Paulo (state)) Marília, São Paulo	Centro de Treinamento CBBS/Yakult, Ibiúna
Medicina USP	(São Paulo (state)) Ribeirão Preto, São Paulo	Centro de Treinamento CBBS/Yakult, Ibiúna
Londrina	(Paraná (state)) Londrina, Paraná	Estádio Municipal de Beisebol e Softbol
Maringá	(Paraná (state)) Maringá, Paraná	Estádio Municipal de Beisebol e Softbol
Pinheiros	(Paraná (state)) Curitiba, Paraná	Estádio Municipal de Beisebol e Softbol
Presidente Prudente	(São Paulo (state)) Presidente Prudente, São Paulo	Beisebol Presidente Prudente
VG Spartans	Várzea Grande, Mato Grosso	Associação Nipo-Brasileira de Várzea Grande

Location of teams in Brazilian Baseball Championship

== See also ==
- Baseball awards § Brazil
