= Eagles Praha =

Baseball team in Prague, Czech Republic

| Team logo | Cap insignia |

Information
- League: Czech Extraliga
- Location: Prague, Czech Republic
- Ballpark: Baseballový areál Eagles Praha
- Established: 1981; 44 years ago
- Colors: Green and white
- Manager: Vladimír Chlup

Current uniforms
| Home | Away |

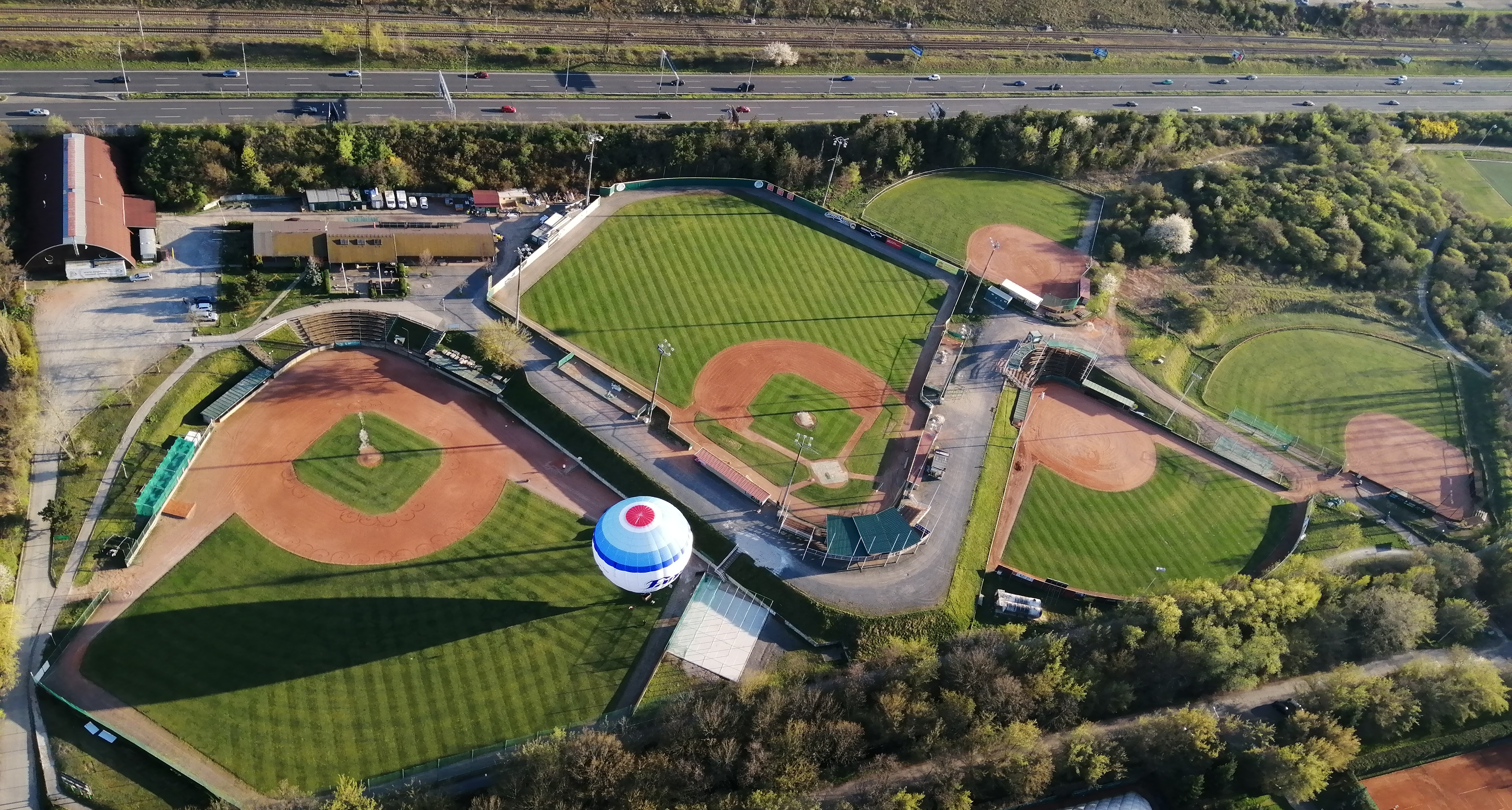
Eagles Praha baseball grounds

Eagles Praha is a baseball team from Prague, Czech Republic. The team plays in the Czech Extraliga.

== History ==
The club was established on 3 February 1981 in the Krč district of Prague as TJ Sokol Praha 4 – Krč. In 1984, the club built its current facilities in a piece of land in Krč. In 1991, the team changed its name to Sokol Krč. In 2000, the organization signed a sponsorship agreement with Altron, a Czech technological supplier, and changed its name to Krč Altron in 2001. For the 2009 season, the club dropped the sponsor title and changed its name to Eagles Praha.

The Eagles have never won the Extraliga title, but were runners-up in 1999, 2004, 2012 and 2019.

Four Eagles' players were called to represent Czech Republic at the 2023 World Baseball Classic qualification: pitcher Tomáš Duffek, catcher Martin Červenka, infielder Petr Zýma and outfielder Marek Chlup. All four players also made it to the 2023 World Baseball Classic final roster, where Czech Republic played its pool in the Tokyo Dome in Japan.

== Ballpark ==
Eagles Praha has the largest baseball and softball facilities in the Czech Republic. The complex has two baseball fields, three softball fields, a multi-purpose indoor arena, a batting practice center and a gym.

The complex is located in the Krč district in the Prague 4 municipality, south of Prague's city center.

== Roster ==
Eagles Praha roster
| Players | | Coaches |
| Pitchers: 6 (Venezuela) José Balaguera; 7 (Czech Republic) Tomáš Duffek; 42 (Czech Republic) Ondřej Hegr; 51 (Czech Republic) Vasko Kolev; 50 (Czech Republic) Albert Pražák; 20 (Czech Republic) Jan Uhlíř; 85 (Czech Republic) Šimon Vyklický; 34 (Czech Republic) Tadeáš Zavadil | Catchers: 1 (Czech Republic) Matouš Bubeník; 14 (Czech Republic) Lukáš Derganz; 68 (Czech Republic) Zdeněk Machačka; 44 (Czech Republic) Marcus Weinzimer; Infielders: 21 (Czech Republic) Šimon Blažek; 48 (Czech Republic) Mikuláš Hanuš; 90 (United States) Gehrig Octavio; 81 (Czech Republic) Matyáš Trčka; 43 (Czech Republic) Jan Uhlík; 9 (Czech Republic) Petr Zýma; Outfielders: 63 (Czech Republic) Michal Antoň; 37 (Czech Republic) Marek Chlup; 27 (Czech Republic) Matyáš Fous; 39 (Czech Republic) Aleš Prandžev; 74 (Czech Republic) Marek Slabý; 86 (Czech Republic) Jan Výbora | Manager: 47 (Czech Republic) Vladimír Chlup; Roster updated on 15 January 2024 |
