= Bruce Maxwell =

German-American baseball player (born 1990)

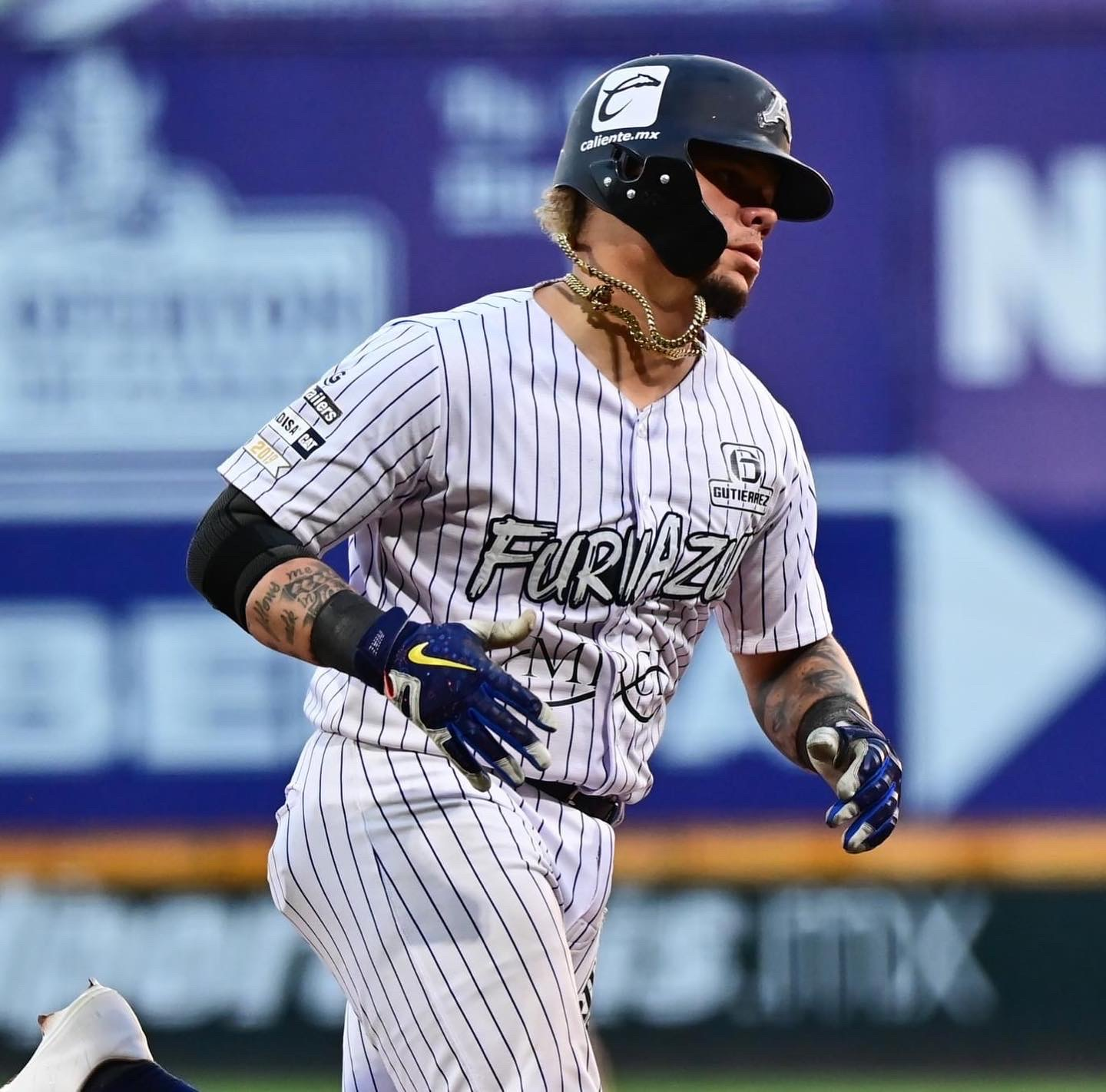
- Maxwell with the Acereros De Monclova in 2022
- Catcher
- Born: December 20, 1990 (age 35); Wiesbaden, Germany
- Batted: Left Threw: Right

MLB debut
- July 23, 2016, for the Oakland Athletics

Last MLB appearance
- June 2, 2018, for the Oakland Athletics

MLB statistics
- Batting average: .240
- Home runs: 5
- Runs batted in: 42
- Stats at Baseball Reference

Teams
- Oakland Athletics (2016–2018)

Bruce Tyrone Maxwell III (born December 20, 1990) is a German–born American former professional baseball catcher. He played in Major League Baseball (MLB) for the Oakland Athletics from 2016 through 2018.

Maxwell was the first MLB player to join other US athletes protesting racial injustice by kneeling during the national anthem.

== Early life ==
Maxwell was born on a U.S. military installation in Wiesbaden, Germany, while his father, Bruce Jr., was stationed there with the U.S. Army during a tour of duty. He is biracial, his father being African-American and his mother Caucasian.

Maxwell played first base at Sparkman High School in Alabama. He then played first base and catcher in college baseball at Division III Birmingham–Southern College in Alabama.

== Professional career ==
=== Oakland Athletics ===
The Oakland Athletics selected Maxwell in the second round of the 2012 Major League Baseball draft. He made his debut that year with the AZL Athletics, and was promoted to the Vermont Lake Monsters of the Low-A New York-Pennsylvania League after six games. For Vermont, he batted .254 with 22 RBIs and was charged with 18 passed balls in 38 games. In 2013, playing for both the Beloit Snappers in the Single-A Midwest League and the Stockton Ports in the High-A California League, he batted .275 with seven home runs and 49 RBIs in 104 games between both teams.

In 2014, Maxwell batted .243/.334/.334 between Stockton and the Midland RockHounds of the Double-A Texas League. In 2015, he spent the whole season at Midland, batting .243/.321/.308 in 96 games.

==== 2016 ====
Maxwell began 2016 with the Nashville Sounds of the Triple-A Pacific Coast League.

Maxwell was called up to the majors for the first time on July 23, 2016. He made his major league debut that night. In 60 games for Nashville prior to his promotion, he was batting .321 with ten home runs and 41 RBIs. He spent the remainder of the season with Oakland after his promotion and batted .283/.337/.402 in 33 games.

==== 2017 ====
Maxwell began 2017 with Nashville and was recalled and optioned multiple times before he was called up to Oakland for the remainder of the season on June 22. In 76 games for Oakland, he batted .237 with three home runs and 22 RBIs.

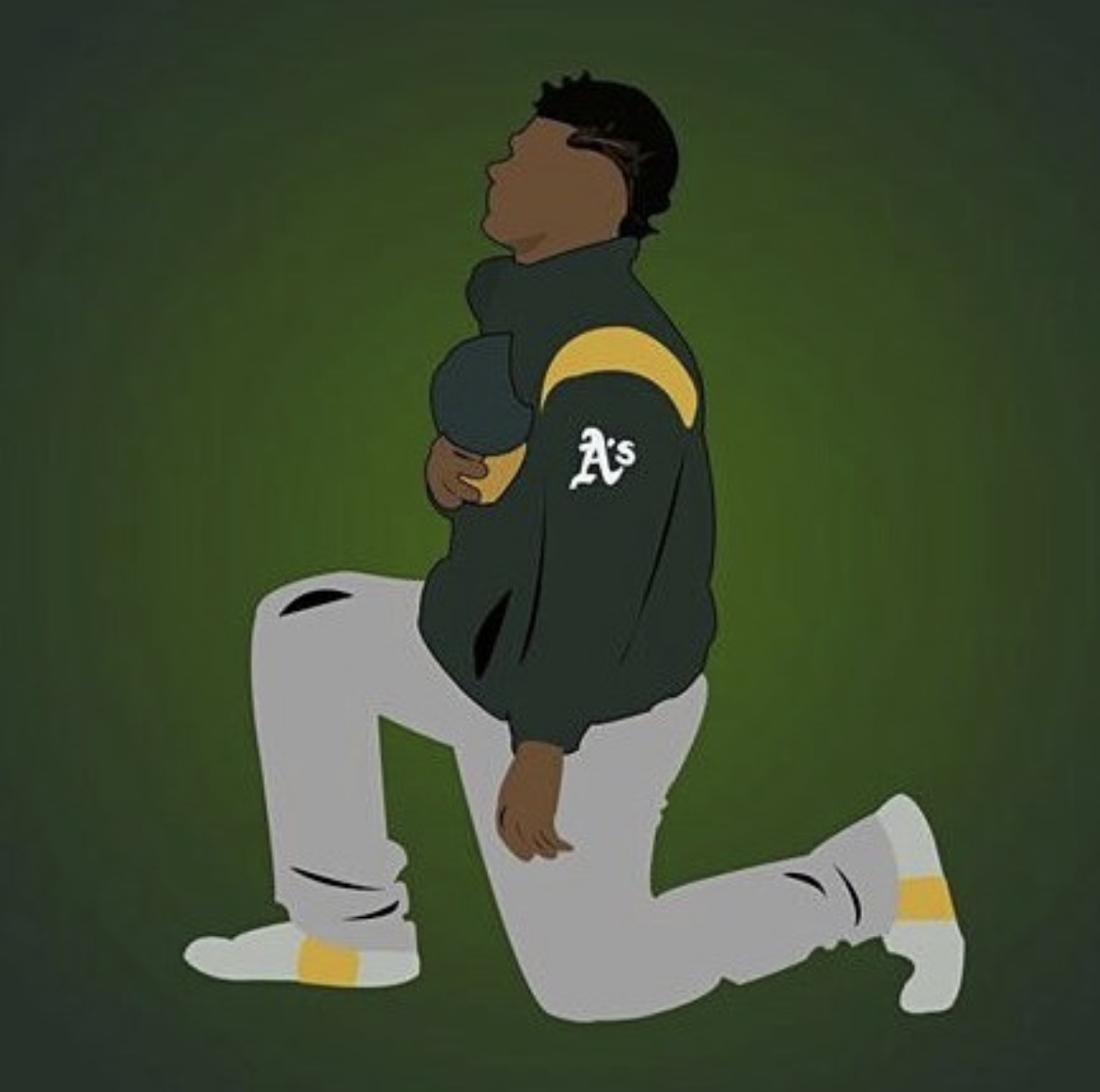
Artistic interpretation of Bruce Maxwell Kneeling in 2017

On September 23, 2017, Maxwell became the first MLB player to join other US athletes protesting racial injustice by kneeling during the national anthem; Maxwell placed his hand over his heart, and teammate Mark Canha stood next to Maxwell and put a hand on his shoulder in support. Maxwell's actions came in response to President Donald Trump's comments that professional football franchise owners should fire players who knelt during the anthem. On Twitter and through his agent, Maxwell said his decision to kneel represented concern for racial injustice as well as freedom of speech and exercise of peaceful protest. The Oakland Athletics immediately issued a statement saying the team "pride[s] ourselves on being inclusive" and supports "players' constitutional rights and freedom of expression." While supported by the A's, Maxwell's future career in the MLB was seen as impacted by the reaction to his kneeling. He remained the only MLB player to protest by kneeling until 2020, when the league allowed for "Black Lives Matter" patches and organized league-wide kneeling for social justice in the aftermath of the nationwide protests of the murder of George Floyd by police in Minneapolis.

Subsequently, Maxwell said that while eating at a restaurant with a city councilman with whom he had attended high school, Devyn Keith, and another friend in Maxwell's hometown of Huntsville, Alabama, a waiter objected to Maxwell's protest and refused to serve their table. The waiter denied the story, saying he did not know who Maxwell was.

==== 2018 ====
Maxwell began 2018 with Oakland. He was placed on the restricted list on May 16 when the Athletics entered Canada to play the Toronto Blue Jays, as he was not eligible for entry into Canada as he had not yet been sentenced for his assault with a deadly weapon charge that was placed in the previous off-season. He was designated for assignment on September 1, 2018. Maxwell cleared waivers and was sent outright to Triple-A Nashville on September 6. For the season with the A's, he batted .182/.207/.309 with one home run. He elected free agency following the season on November 2.

=== Acereros de Monclova ===
On March 6, 2019, Maxwell signed with the Acereros de Monclova of the Mexican League. He was successful in his first season with the club, slashing .325/.407/.559 with 24 home runs and 112 RBIs across 109 games played. Maxwell was also selected to the LMB All-Star Game and won the Serie del Rey with the Acereros, which was the first-ever championship for the team.

Maxwell re-signed with the Acereros de Monclova for the 2020 season. However, due to the COVID-19 pandemic, the season was canceled.

=== New York Mets ===
On July 27, 2020, the New York Mets signed Maxwell to a minor-league deal, pending a physical and a negative COVID-19 test. Maxwell did not play in a game in 2020 due to the cancellation of the minor league season because of the COVID-19 pandemic. He re-signed with the Mets on a new minor league deal on November 2, 2020. In 9 games for the Triple-A Syracuse Mets in 2021, Maxwell slashed .174/.355/.348 with 1 home run and 6 RBI.

=== San Francisco Giants ===
On June 5, 2021, Maxwell was traded to the San Francisco Giants in exchange for cash considerations. Maxwell underwent Tommy John surgery in July and missed the remainder of the season. In 9 games for the Double-A Richmond Flying Squirrels, Maxwell had gone 8-for-34 with 1 home run and 6 RBI. Maxwell elected minor league free agency following the season on November 7, 2021.

=== Acereros de Monclova (second stint) ===
On January 14, 2022, Maxwell signed with the Acereros de Monclova of the Mexican League . Maxwell slashed .365/.472/.615 with 10 home runs and 37 RBI across 44 games played.

=== Piratas de Campeche ===
On March 16, 2023, Maxwell was traded to the Piratas de Campeche of the Mexican League. In 18 games, he batted .231/.412/.365 with one home run and six RBI.

=== Rieleros de Aguascalientes ===
On June 14, 2023, Maxwell was traded to the Rieleros de Aguascalientes of the Mexican League. In 12 games, he batted .194/.356/.444 with two home runs and five RBI. On July 8, Maxwell was released by the Rieleros.

On November 21, 2023, Maxwell signed with the Saraperos de Saltillo of the Mexican League. He was released prior to the start of the season on April 9, 2024.

=== World Baseball Classic (WBC) ===
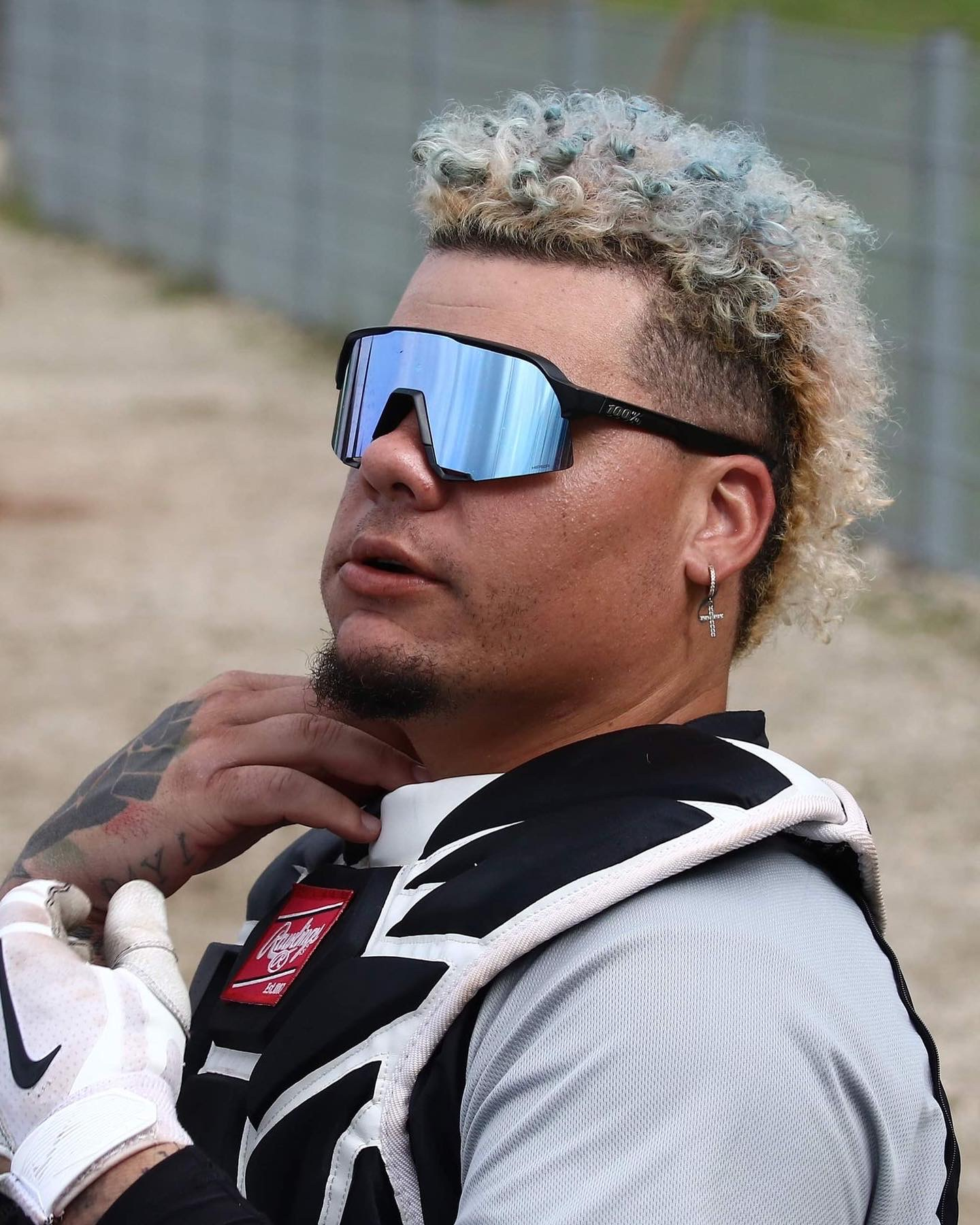
Maxwell 2022 WBC Qualifier - Regensburg, Germany

Maxwell has represented team Germany at the World Baseball Classic Qualifiers for three cycles (2016, 2020 (canceled), and 2022).

== Coaching career ==
=== Toros de Tijuana ===
On April 10, 2024, Maxwell joined the Toros de Tijuana of the Mexican League coaching staff as the catching coach for the 2024 season. It was his professional coaching debut at the age of 33. As part of a management restructuring, the club relieved Maxwell of his duties on May 21.

== Awards and honors ==
| Award | Year | Team | League |
|---|---|---|---|
| MID Mid-Season All Star | 2013 | Beloit Snapper | MID |
| CAL Mid-Season All-Star | 2014 | Stockton Ports | CAL |
| PCL Player of the Week | 7/17/2016 | Nashville Sounds | PCL |
| MiLB.com Organization All-Star | 2016 | Oakland Athletics | AL |
| MEX Mid-Season All-Star | 2019 | Acereros del Norte | Mex |

== Personal life ==
On October 28, 2017, Maxwell was accused of pointing a firearm at a food delivery driver delivering food to him at his home in Scottsdale, Arizona late at night. Maxwell was arrested on a felony charge of aggravated assault with a deadly weapon. On July 2, 2018, he was sentenced to two years probation for disorderly conduct.
