= Czech Baseball Extraliga =

Czech baseball league

Extraliga
- Classification: Semi-pro
- Sport: Baseball
- Founded: 1993; 33 years ago
- First season: 1993; 33 years ago
- No. of teams: 8
- Country: Czech Republic
- Continent: Europe
- Most recent champion: Hroši Brno
- Most titles: Draci Brno (26)
- Relegation to: 1. Liga
- Website: https://extraliga.baseball.cz/

The Czech Baseball Extraliga, or simply Extraliga, is the highest level of baseball in the Czech Republic. The league was established in 1993 after the dissolution of Czechoslovakia. The league is currently contested by eight teams and the games are played from April to May with the playoffs beginning in June.

The Extraliga operates a promotion and relegation system with the 1. Liga (the second tier baseball league in Czech Republic) where the bottom teams from the Extraliga are relegated to the 1. Liga and the top teams from the 1. Liga are promoted to the Extraliga.

== History ==
The Czechoslovak Baseball League was established in 1979, and Tempo Praha became the first baseball champions. However, in 1993, after the dissolution of Czechoslovakia, the league was disbanded and the Czech Baseball Extraliga was established, comprising teams only from the Czech Republic.

The first Extraliga champions were Technika Brno, winners of the 1993 and 1994 seasons. Draci Brno rapidly became the dominant team in the league, winning every season from 1995 to 2010 and eight more times after that, totalling 24 championships, the most recent in 2023. In recent years, Arrows Ostrava won two championships back to back in 2018 and 2019 and again in 2021, becoming the second most winning team in the Extraliga, tied with Technika Brno.

The Extraliga was one of the first sports leagues in Europe, and the first major baseball league in the world, to restart following lockdowns concerning the COVID-19 pandemic.

== Foreign players ==
Since 2016, the Extraliga allows a maximum of five foreign players on a team roster and there is a limit of three foreigners in the team's lineup at the same time during a game. This changed during 2020, when, due to the COVID-19 pandemic, foreign players were banned, except for residents of the Czech Republic. This ban was lifted for the 2021 season and the rules remained as they were before 2020.

Notable Extraliga foreign players include some former major leaguers. Panamanian pitcher Roger Deago played for Technika Brno in 1997 and 1998 before signing as an amateur free agent by the San Diego Padres in 2002 and making his Major League Baseball debut in 2003; Deago returned to Technika for the 2011 season. In 2019, Draci Brno signed Australian pitcher Peter Moylan, who played 11 games, winning three and losing one.

Historically, the majority of foreign players in the Extraliga come from North America, Latin America and Australia.

In the 2020s, the Extraliga began attracting increased talent from Japan. Notable former Nippon Professional Baseball players playing in NPB during this time include Toru Murata, Takashi Ogino and Koki Ugusa.

== Current teams ==
Team	City/Town	Field	Founded
Arrows Ostrava	Ostrava	Arrows Park Ostrava	1973
Cardion Hroši Brno	Brno	Sportovní areál Hroch	2003
Draci Brno	Brno	Městský baseballový stadión	1972
Eagles Praha	Prague	Baseballový a softballový areál Eagles Praha	1981
Kotlářka Praha	Prague	Stadión Markéta	1980
SaBaT Praha	Prague	Baseballový a softballový areál SaBaT Praha	1969
Sokol Hluboká	Hluboká nad Vltavou	Baseballové hřiště Hluboká nad Vltavou	1994
Třebíč Nuclears	Třebíč	Stadion Na Hvězdě	1986

== Winners ==
Team	Champions	Runners-up	Winning seasons	Runners-up seasons
Draci Brno	26	4	1995, 1996, 1997, 1998, 1999, 2000, 2001, 2002, 2003, 2004, 2005, 2006, 2007, 2008, 2009, 2010, 2012, 2013, 2014, 2016, 2017, 2020, 2022, 2023, 2024, 2025	2011, 2015, 2018, 2021
Technika Brno	3	6	1993, 1994, 2011	1997, 1998, 2000, 2001, 2002, 2010
Arrows Ostrava	3	6	2018, 2019, 2021	2005, 2006, 2008, 2009, 2017, 2020
Kotlářka Praha	1	4	2015	2013, 2014, 2016, 2026
Hroši Brno	1	3	2026	2022, 2024, 2025
Eagles Praha	0	4	–	1999, 2004, 2012, 2019
SaBaT Praha	0	3	–	1993, 1995, 1996
Tempo Praha	0	3	–	1994, 2003, 2023
VSK Express Brno	0	1	–	2007
