= 2017 Baseball European Cup Rosters =

Eight teams, from 5 nations, are competing at the 2017 European Champions Cup.

== Pool A ==
=== CNF Unipolsai Bologna ===
Manager
(Italy) Daniele Frignani
Coaches
Fabio Betto, Roberto Radaelli

Player	No.	Pos.	DOB and age	Nationality
Matteo Bocchi	46	P	July 19, 1996 (aged 20)	(Italy)
Nicolo Clemente	38	P	February 18, 1998 (aged 19)	(Italy)
Roberto Corrdini	31	P	September 23, 1978 (aged 38)	(Italy)
Filippo Crepaldi	19	P	February 19, 1992 (aged 25)	(Italy)
Rudy Owens	32	P	December 18, 1987 (aged 29)	(United States)
Luca Panerati	34	P	December 2, 1989 (aged 27)	(Italy)
Andrea Pizziconi	71	P	October 4, 1991 (aged 25)	(Italy)
Nick Pugliese	14	P	September 18, 1985 (aged 31)	(Italy) (United States)
Raul Rivero	75	P	May 6, 1985 (aged 32)	(Venezuela)
Osman Marval	4	C	November 26, 1986 (aged 30)	(Venezuela)
Marco Sabbatani	41	C	April 13, 1989 (aged 28)	(Italy)
Filippo Agretti	25	IF	November 16, 1995 (aged 21)	(Italy)
Francesco Fuzzi	22	IF	June 14, 1985 (aged 31)	(Italy)
Robel García	15	IF	March 28, 1993 (aged 24)	(Italy) (Dominican Republic)
Alex Sambucci	83	IF	September 29, 1989 (aged 27)	(Italy)
Alessandro Vaglio	23	IF	January 28, 1989 (aged 28)	(Italy)
Paolino Ambrosino	51	OF	February 17, 1989 (aged 28)	(Italy)
Alessandro Grimaudo	29	OF	September 6, 1993 (aged 23)	(Italy)
Nick Nosti	16	OF	September 16, 1985 (aged 31)	(Italy) (United States)
Alexander Russo	99	OF	September 24, 1993 (aged 23)	(Italy) (Dominican Republic)

=== Curaçao Neptunus ===
Manager
(Netherlands) Ronald Jaarsma
Coaches
Jan Collins, Eithel Martinus, Paul van den Oever

Player	No.	Pos.	DOB and age	Nationality
Misja Harcksen	19	P	April 19, 1995 (aged 22)	(Netherlands)
Kevin Kelly	33	P	May 27, 1990 (aged 27)	(Netherlands)
Elton Koeiman	28	P	May 8, 1973 (aged 44)	(Netherlands)
Diegomar Markwell	35	P	August 8, 1980 (aged 36)	(Netherlands)
Jan Tomek	29	P	January 29, 1992 (aged 25)	(Czech Republic)
Mike van der Berg	36	P	November 16, 1997 (aged 19)	(Netherlands)
Berry van Driel	3	P	December 26, 1984 (aged 32)	(Netherlands)
Loek van Mil	46	P	September 15, 1984 (aged 32)	(Netherlands)
Gianison Boekhoudt	26	C	October 15, 1989 (aged 27)	(Netherlands)
Daniel Fernandes	10	C	February 23, 1992 (aged 25)	(Netherlands)
Brian Raap	39	C	June 20, 1990 (aged 26)	(United States)
Benjamin Dille	11	IF	September 13, 1986 (aged 30)	(Belgium)
Dwayne Kemp	24	IF	February 24, 1988 (aged 29)	(Netherlands)
Gregory Muller	9	IF	July 2, 1991 (aged 25)	(United States)
Dan Seelbach	2	IF	December 28, 1999 (aged 17)	(Netherlands)
Stijn van der Meer	18	IF	May 1, 1993 (aged 24)	(Netherlands)
Ruar Verkerk	5	IF	September 5, 1996 (aged 20)	(Netherlands)
Shaldimar Daantji	23	OF	May 4, 1984 (aged 33)	(Netherlands)
Christian Díaz	32	OF	June 15, 1989 (aged 27)	(Netherlands)
Urving Kemp	12	OF	September 2, 1993 (aged 23)	(Netherlands)
Jochem Koedjik	27	OF	December 24, 1991 (aged 25)	(Netherlands)

=== Mainz Athletics ===
Manager
(United States) Randy Ewart
Coaches
Josh Little

Player	No.	Pos.	DOB and age	Nationality
Riley Barr	32	P	July 30, 1991 (aged 25)	(United States)
Manuel Möller	34	P	August 11, 1983 (aged 33)	(Germany)
Tim Stahlmann	3	P	November 10, 1991 (aged 25)	(Germany)
Yannic Wildenhain	31	P	July 16, 1998 (aged 18)	(Germany)
Max Boldt	23	C	January 9, 1988 (aged 29)	(Germany)
Ben Briggs	6	C	September 24, 1995 (aged 21)	(Germany)
Eric Keller	27	C	May 1, 1999 (aged 18)	(Germany)
Jeff Hunt	25	IF	February 13, 1991 (aged 26)	(Canada)
Martin Kipphan	17	IF	June 20, 1983 (aged 33)	(Germany)
Lennard Stöcklin	1	IF	June 1, 1993 (aged 24)	(Germany)
Nici Weichert	22	IF	February 8, 1992 (aged 25)	(Germany)
Peter Johannessen	11	OF	October 30, 1984 (aged 32)	(Sweden)
Zach Johnson	13	OF	January 3, 1990 (aged 27)	(Canada)
Kevin Kotowski	8	OF	January 5, 1991 (aged 26)	(Germany)
Tim Kotowski	10	OF	November 18, 1994 (aged 22)	(Germany)
Marcel Schulz	37	OF	October 15, 1992 (aged 24)	(Germany)

=== Rouen Huskies ===
Manager
(Venezuela) Keino Pérez
Coaches
François Colombier, Gregory Fages

Player	No.	Pos.	DOB and age	Nationality
Jean Granados	9	P	September 26, 1982 (aged 34)	(Venezuela)
Marc-André Habeck	2	P	December 11, 1993 (aged 23)	(France) (Canada)
Owen Ozanich	23	P	June 23, 1989 (aged 27)	(France) (United States)
Esteban Prioul	17	P	August 25, 1997 (aged 19)	(France)
Yoann Vaugelade	28	P	September 6, 1999 (aged 17)	(France)
Hugo Blondel	40	C	July 8, 1997 (aged 19)	(France)
Dylan Gleeson	19	C	January 16, 1995 (aged 22)	(France)
Sebastien Duchossoy	26	IF	September 14, 1989 (aged 27)	(France)
Gabriel Fromental-Houle	4	IF	February 4, 1993 (aged 24)	(Canada)
Larry Infante	11	IF	April 4, 1985 (aged 32)	(Venezuela)
Jonathan Jaspe	8	IF	April 11, 1985 (aged 32)	(Venezuela)
Maxime Lefevre	1	IF	February 17, 1991 (aged 26)	(France)
René Leveret	60	IF	November 19, 1985 (aged 31)	(France)
Maxime Nutte	10	IF	July 9, 1995 (aged 21)	(France)
Luc Piquet	45	IF	July 5, 1981 (aged 35)	(France)
Léo Céspedes	14	OF	January 14, 1994 (aged 23)	(France) (Cuba)
Oscar Combes	5	OF	March 17, 1993 (aged 24)	(France)
Valentin Durier	38	OF	September 17, 1997 (aged 19)	(France)
Kenji Hagiwara	51	OF	May 15, 1986 (aged 31)	(France) (Japan)

== Pool B ==
=== A.S.D. Rimini ===
Manager
(Italy) Paolo Ceccaroli
Coaches
César Heredia, Pierpaolo Illuminati, Andrea Palumbo, Paolo Siroli

Player	No.	Pos.	DOB and age	Nationality
Daniele Del Bianco	21	P	January 7, 1978 (aged 39)	(Italy)
Luca DiRaffaele	27	P	September 24, 1994 (aged 22)	(Italy)
Jose Escalona	37	P	January 7, 1986 (aged 31)	(Italy) (Venezuela)
Ricardo Hernández	94	P	January 23, 1988 (aged 29)	(Spain) (Venezuela)
Carlos Richetti	36	P	August 23, 1983 (aged 33)	(Italy) (Dominican Republic)
José Rosario	50	P	February 16, 1986 (aged 31)	(Dominican Republic)
Carlos Terán	25	P	March 18, 1990 (aged 27)	(Italy) (Venezuela)
Riccardo Bertagnon	40	C	October 2, 1984 (aged 32)	(Italy)
Antonio Giovaninni	12	C	June 13, 1992 (aged 24)	(Italy)
Gionni Luciani	70	C	June 27, 1996 (aged 20)	(Italy)
Lorenzo Di Fabio	54	IF	June 30, 1992 (aged 24)	(Italy)
Juan Carlos Infante	6	IF	October 8, 1981 (aged 35)	(Italy) (Venezuela)
Daniele Malengo	3	IF	May 20, 1989 (aged 28)	(Italy)
Freddy Noguera	43	IF	January 10, 1991 (aged 26)	(Italy) (Venezuela)
Lino Zappone	1	IF	January 30, 1988 (aged 29)	(Italy) (Venezuela)
Federico Celli	51	OF	February 15, 1995 (aged 22)	(Italy)
Carlos Durán	11	OF	January 27, 1981 (aged 36)	(Italy) (Venezuela)
Giovanni Garbella	17	OF	January 19, 1996 (aged 21)	(Italy) (United States)
Nicola Garbella	5	OF	December 11, 1992 (aged 24)	(Italy) (United States)

=== Buchbinder Legionäre ===
Manager
(Germany) Kai Gronauer
Coaches
Francis García, Jack Lind, Stefan Müller

Player	No.	Pos.	DOB and age	Nationality
Mike Bolsenbroek	20	P	March 11, 1987 (aged 30)	(Netherlands)
Jonathan Eisenhuth	77	P	June 4, 1992 (aged 25)	(Germany)
Eric Faint	14	P	September 18, 1986 (aged 30)	(Germany) (United States)
Valerio Jiron	33	P	February 16, 2000 (aged 17)	(Germany)
Daniel Mendelsohn	38	P	February 9, 1998 (aged 19)	(Germany) (South Africa)
Philipp Meyer	31	P	April 30, 1998 (aged 19)	(Germany)
Niklas Rimmel	30	P	July 5, 1999 (aged 17)	(Germany)
Joshua Spezia	39	P	February 2, 2000 (aged 17)	(Germany)
Kevin Vance	10	P	July 8, 1990 (aged 26)	(United States) (Philippines)
Michael Wöhrl	29	P	October 3, 1993 (aged 23)	(Germany)
Jonathan Heimler	36	C	July 21, 1997 (aged 19)	(Germany)
Marvin Kulinna	23	C	October 3, 1999 (aged 17)	(Germany)
Elias von Garßen	25	C	July 27, 1996 (aged 20)	(Germany)
Jeffrey Ardnt	13	IF	November 27, 1998 (aged 18)	(Germany)
Maik Ehmcke	26	IF	July 14, 1994 (aged 22)	(Germany)
David Grimes	57	IF	September 18, 1998 (aged 18)	(Germany) (Republic of Ireland)
Marco Iberle	46	IF	May 12, 2001 (aged 16)	(Germany)
Lukas Jahn	1	IF	September 29, 1991 (aged 25)	(Germany)
Nino Sacasa	11	IF	April 6, 1996 (aged 21)	(Germany)
Alexander Schmidt	6	IF	April 2, 1999 (aged 18)	(Germany) (Australia)
Marcel Jiménez	40	OF	September 13, 1995 (aged 21)	(Germany)
Jannis Muschik	45	OF	April 7, 1995 (aged 22)	(Germany)
Matthew Vance	4	OF	July 28, 1986 (aged 30)	(United States) (Philippines)

=== L&D Amsterdam ===
Manager
(Netherlands) Charlie Urbanus
Coaches
Randell Hannah, Tjerk Smeets

Player	No.	Pos.	DOB and age	Nationality
Hidde Brocken	26	P	October 20, 1996 (aged 20)	(Netherlands)
Dennis Burgersdijk	7	P	July 19, 1988 (aged 28)	(Netherlands)
Rob Cordemans	38	P	October 31, 1974 (aged 42)	(Netherlands)
Dan Heendrix	22	P	July 5, 1990 (aged 26)	(Netherlands)
Kevin Heijstek	13	P	April 19, 1988 (aged 29)	(Netherlands)
Robin Schel	11	P	February 10, 1993 (aged 24)	(Netherlands)
Nick Veltkamp	24	P	March 15, 1984 (aged 33)	(Netherlands)
Pim Walsma	4	P	February 3, 1987 (aged 30)	(Netherlands)
Kyle Ward	47	P	May 16, 1989 (aged 28)	(United States)
Max Clarijs	12	C	August 11, 1994 (aged 22)	(Netherlands)
Rashid Gerard	25	C	April 12, 1992 (aged 25)	(Netherlands)
Danny Vader	88	C	November 4, 1984 (aged 32)	(Netherlands)
Jesse Aussems	15	IF	June 19, 1992 (aged 24)	(Netherlands)
Kenny Berkenbosch	10	IF	March 17, 1985 (aged 32)	(Netherlands)
Patrick Bok	46	IF	May 25, 1992 (aged 25)	(Netherlands)
Zerzinho Croes	1	IF	December 3, 1990 (aged 26)	(Netherlands)
Norbert Jongerius	8	IF	April 6, 1991 (aged 26)	(Netherlands) (France)
Nick Urbanus	2	IF	March 29, 1992 (aged 25)	(Netherlands)
Linoy Croes	72	OF	May 7, 1987 (aged 30)	(Netherlands)
Remco Draijer	18	OF	October 24, 1987 (aged 29)	(Netherlands)
Gilmer Lampe	3	OF	March 1, 1990 (aged 27)	(Netherlands)
Danny Rombley	27	OF	November 26, 1979 (aged 37)	(Netherlands)

=== T&A San Marino ===
Manager
(Italy) Marco Nanni
Coaches
Carlos Del Santo, Alberto Gallusi, Luca Spadoni

Player	No.	Pos.	DOB and age	Nationality
José Ascanio	75	P	May 2, 1985 (aged 32)	(Venezuela)
Yoimer Camacho	74	P	February 24, 1990 (aged 27)	(Venezuela)
Tommaso Cheburini	35	P	November 9, 1990 (aged 26)	(Italy)
Frailyn Florian	94	P	July 25, 1982 (aged 34)	(Italy) (Dominican Republic)
Josh Kimborowicz	37	P	March 17, 1992 (aged 25)	(Italy) (United States)
Orlando Oberto	38	P	December 30, 1980 (aged 36)	(Italy) (Venezuela)
Andrés Pérez	53	P	February 8, 1991 (aged 26)	(Spain) (Venezuela)
Carlos Quevedo	70	P	September 30, 1989 (aged 27)	(Venezuela)
Simone Albanese	28	C	October 13, 1985 (aged 31)	(Italy)
Daniele Cenni	15	C	May 27, 1983 (aged 34)	(San Marino)
Pierangelo Cit	50	C	April 24, 1991 (aged 26)	(Italy)
Nicholas Morreale	21	C	April 8, 1988 (aged 29)	(Italy) (United States)
Riccardo Babini	16	IF	January 27, 1988 (aged 29)	(Italy)
Erick Epifano	14	IF	March 31, 1990 (aged 27)	(Italy) (Venezuela)
Gabriele Ermini	9	IF	January 23, 1976 (aged 41)	(Italy)
Leonardo Ferrini	12	IF	April 17, 1989 (aged 28)	(Italy) (Venezuela)
Francesco Imperiali	19	IF	November 10, 1983 (aged 33)	(Italy)
Luca Pulzetti	7	IF	April 15, 1994 (aged 23)	(Italy)
Lorenzo Avagnina	10	OF	November 14, 1980 (aged 36)	(Italy)
Mario Chiarini	45	OF	January 7, 1981 (aged 36)	(Italy)
Sebastiano Poma	26	OF	June 13, 1983 (aged 33)	(Italy)
Mattia Reginato	55	OF	May 18, 1990 (aged 27)	(Italy)
