= 2015 European Champions Cup (baseball) =

Tournament details
- Countries: France; Italy; Netherlands
- Dates: June 2 – August 9
- Teams: 12
- Defending champions: T&A San Marino

Final positions
- Champions: (Netherlands) Curaçao Neptunus (8th title)
- Runners-up: (Italy) Unipolsai Bologna

Tournament statistics
- Games played: 35
- Attendance: 10,520 (301 per game)

The 2015 European Champions Cup was a European baseball competition, held from June 2, to August 9, 2015. This was the fifty-third iteration of the Cup since its inaugural tournament in 1963. The champions were Dutch team Curaçao Neptunus, winning their eighth title.

== List of competing teams ==
| Federation | Qualified Team(s) |
|---|---|
| (Italy) / (San Marino) FIBS | Rimini Baseball; T&A San Marino; Unipolsai Bologna |
| (Netherlands) KNBSB | Amsterdam Pirates; Curaçao Neptunus |
| (Germany) DBV | Heidenheim Heideköpfe; Solingen Alligators |
| (France) FFBSC | Paris Université Club; Templiers de Sénart |
| (Czech Republic) CBA | Draci Brno |
| (Ukraine) FBSU | KNTU Elizavetgrad |
| (Belarus) BBA | Brest Zubrs |

== First round ==
| Qualified for Playoff |
| Eliminated |

=== Paris Group ===
| Rk | Team | W | L | Pct. | RF | RA |
|---|---|---|---|---|---|---|
| 1 | (Italy) Unipolsai Bologna | 4 | 1 | .800 | 55 | 15 |
| 2 | (Netherlands) Amsterdam Pirates | 4 | 1 | .800 | 40 | 13 |
| 3 | T&A San Marino | 4 | 1 | .800 | 35 | 9 |
| 4 | (Germany) Solingen Alligators | 2 | 3 | .400 | 48 | 38 |
| 5 | (France) Paris Université Club | 1 | 4 | .200 | 22 | 55 |
| 6 | (Belarus) Brest Zubrs | 0 | 5 | .000 | 2 | 72 |

| Date | Local time | Road team | Score | Home team | Inn. | Venue | Game duration | Attendance | Boxscore |
|---|---|---|---|---|---|---|---|---|---|
| Jun 2, 2015 | 12:00 | Unipolsai Bologna (Italy) | 2-5 | T&A San Marino | | Stade Pershing | 2:31 | 80 | Boxscore |
| Jun 2, 2015 | 15:00 | Amsterdam Pirates (Netherlands) | 11-1 | (Germany) Solingen Alligators | | Stade Chartres | 2:56 | 37 | Boxscore |
| Jun 2, 2015 | 17:00 | Paris Université Club (France) | 14-1 | (Belarus) Brest Zubrs | 7 | Stade Pershing | 2:10 | 80 | Boxscore |
| Jun 3, 2015 | 12:00 | T&A San Marino | 0–6 | (Netherlands) Amsterdam Pirates | | Stade Pershing | 2:57 | 100 | Boxscore |
| Jun 3, 2015 | 15:00 | Brest Zubrs (Belarus) | 0–15 | (Italy) Unipolsai Bologna | 6 | Stade Chartres | 1:43 | 20 | Boxscore |
| Jun 3, 2015 | 17:00 | Solingen Alligators (Germany) | 17-4 | (France) Paris Université Club | 8 | Stade Pershing | 2:51 | 100 | Boxscore |
| Jun 4, 2015 | 12:00 | Brest Zubrs (Belarus) | 0-8 | (Netherlands) Amsterdam Pirates | | Stade Pershing | 3:20 | 70 | Boxscore |
| Jun 4, 2015 | 15:00 | Solingen Alligators (Germany) | 0-4 | T&A San Marino | | Stade Chartres | 2:21 | 26 | Boxscore |
| Jun 4, 2015 | 17:00 | Unipolsai Bologna (Italy) | 11-0 | (France) Paris Université Club | 7 | Stade Pershing | 2:19 | 90 | Boxscore |
| Jun 5, 2015 | 12:00 | Unipolsai Bologna (Italy) | 18-10 | (Germany) Solingen Alligators | | Stade Pershing | 3:10 | 60 | Boxscore |
| Jun 5, 2015 | 15:00 | Brest Zubrs (Belarus) | 0–15 | T&A San Marino | 5 | Stade Chartres | 1:24 | 20 | Boxscore |
| Jun 5, 2015 | 17:00 | Paris Université Club (France) | 3–15 | (Netherlands) Amsterdam Pirates | 7 | Stade Pershing | 2:05 | 100 | Boxscore |
| Jun 6, 2015 | 12:00 | Amsterdam Pirates (Netherlands) | 0–9 | (Italy) Unipolsai Bologna | | Stade Pershing | 2:29 | 130 | Boxscore |
| Jun 6, 2015 | 15:00 | Solingen Alligators (Germany) | 20–1 | (Belarus) Brest Zubrs | 8 | Stade Chartres | 2:46 | 30 | Boxscore |
| Jun 6, 2015 | 17:00 | T&A San Marino | 11-1 | (France) Paris Université Club | 7 | Stade Pershing | 2:07 | 160 | Boxscore |

Unipolsai Bologna and T&A San Marino advance to playoff with best HTH.

Playoff

June 7 15:00 at Stade Pershing
| Team | 1 | 2 | 3 | 4 | 5 | 6 | 7 | 8 | 9 | R | H | E |
|---|---|---|---|---|---|---|---|---|---|---|---|---|
| (Netherlands) Amsterdam Pirates | 0 | 1 | 0 | 0 | 0 | 0 | 0 | 0 | 0 | 1 | 3 | 2 |
| (Italy) Unipolsai Bologna | 2 | 0 | 0 | 0 | 0 | 0 | 0 | 0 | X | 2 | 6 | 3 |
WP: (United States) Marquis Fleming (BOL) LP: (Netherlands) Kevin Heijstek (AMS) Sv: (Italy) Nick Pugliese (BOL); Attendance: 230; Umpires: HP − (Austria) Beszczynski, 1B − (Germany) Waider, 2B − (Spain) Ulloa Diaz; Boxscore

=== Rotterdam Group ===
| Rk | Team | W | L | Pct. | RF | RA |
|---|---|---|---|---|---|---|
| 1 | (Netherlands) Curaçao Neptunus | 5 | 0 | 1.000 | 42 | 6 |
| 2 | (Czech Republic) Draci Brno | 3 | 2 | .600 | 23 | 18 |
| 3 | (Italy) Rimini Baseball | 3 | 2 | .600 | 32 | 17 |
| 4 | (Germany) Heidenheim Heideköpfe | 2 | 3 | .400 | 17 | 34 |
| 5 | (France) Templiers de Sénart | 2 | 3 | .400 | 13 | 23 |
| 6 | (Ukraine) KNTU Elizavetgrad | 0 | 5 | .000 | 15 | 45 |

Draci Brno advances to playoff with better HTH.

| Date | Local time | Road team | Score | Home team | Inn. | Venue | Game duration | Attendance | Boxscore |
|---|---|---|---|---|---|---|---|---|---|
| Jun 2, 2015 | 10:30 | Draci Brno (Czech Republic) | 0-2 | (France) Templiers de Sénart | | Familiestadion | 2:52 | 50 | Boxscore |
| Jun 2, 2015 | 15:00 | Heidenheim Heideköpfe (Germany) | 3-8 | (Italy) Rimini Baseball | | Familiestadion | 2:27 | 50 | Boxscore |
| Jun 2, 2015 | 19:30 | KNTU Elizavetgrad (Ukraine) | 0-12 | (Netherlands) Curaçao Neptunus | 7 | Familiestadion | 1:41 | 160 | Boxscore |
| Jun 3, 2015 | 10:30 | Rimini Baseball (Italy) | 8–1 | (Ukraine) KNTU Elizavetgrad | | Familiestadion | 2:15 | 55 | Boxscore |
| Jun 3, 2015 | 15:00 | Templiers de Sénart (France) | 1–5 | (Germany) Heidenheim Heideköpfe | | Familiestadion | 2:38 | 101 | Boxscore |
| Jun 3, 2015 | 19:30 | Curaçao Neptunus (Netherlands) | 6-1 | (Czech Republic) Draci Brno | | Familiestadion | 2:41 | 340 | Boxscore |
| Jun 4, 2015 | 10:30 | Rimini Baseball (Italy) | 11-2 | (France) Templiers de Sénart | | Familiestadion | 2:16 | 66 | Boxscore |
| Jun 4, 2015 | 15:00 | Draci Brno (Czech Republic) | 11-6 | (Ukraine) KNTU Elizavetgrad | | Familiestadion | 2:42 | 67 | Boxscore |
| Jun 4, 2015 | 19:30 | Curaçao Neptunus (Netherlands) | 15-1 | (Germany) Heidenheim Heideköpfe | 7 | Familiestadion | 2:24 | 523 | Boxscore |
| Jun 5, 2015 | 10:30 | KNTU Elizavetgrad (Ukraine) | 5-7 | (Germany) Heidenheim Heideköpfe | | Familiestadion | 2:16 | 105 | Boxscore |
| Jun 5, 2015 | 15:00 | Draci Brno (Czech Republic) | 6-2 | (Italy) Rimini Baseball | | Familiestadion | 2:52 | 178 | Boxscore |
| Jun 5, 2015 | 20:15 | Curaçao Neptunus (Netherlands) | 4-1 | (France) Templiers de Sénart | | Familiestadion | 2:46 | 298 | Boxscore |
| Jun 6, 2015 | 10:30 | Heidenheim Heideköpfe (Germany) | 1–5 | (Czech Republic) Draci Brno | | Familiestadion | 2:25 | 123 | Boxscore |
| Jun 6, 2015 | 15:00 | Rimini Baseball (Italy) | 3–5 | (Netherlands) Curaçao Neptunus | | Familiestadion | 2:42 | 925 | Boxscore |
| Jun 6, 2015 | 19:30 | Templiers de Sénart (France) | 7-3 | (Ukraine) KNTU Elizavetgrad | | Familiestadion | 2:34 | 91 | Boxscore |

Playoff

June 7 13:00 at Familiestadion
| Team | 1 | 2 | 3 | 4 | 5 | 6 | 7 | 8 | 9 | R | H | E |
|---|---|---|---|---|---|---|---|---|---|---|---|---|
| (Czech Republic) Draci Brno | 1 | 1 | 0 | 0 | 0 | 0 | 0 | 0 | 0 | 2 | 9 | 4 |
| (Netherlands) Curaçao Neptunus | 0 | 1 | 0 | 0 | 0 | 0 | 5 | 2 | X | 8 | 15 | 0 |
WP: (Belgium) Kenny van den Branden (NEP) LP: (Czech Republic) Radim Chroust (DRA) Sv: none Attendance: 955; Umpires: HP − (Italy) Fabrizi, 1B − (Lithuania) Ramanauskas, 3B − (Slovakia) Jankovic; Boxscore

== Championship ==
Game 1

August 6 21:00 at Gianni Falchi
| Team | 1 | 2 | 3 | 4 | 5 | 6 | 7 | 8 | 9 | R | H | E |
|---|---|---|---|---|---|---|---|---|---|---|---|---|
| (Netherlands) Curaçao Neptunus | 1 | 1 | 0 | 0 | 0 | 0 | 0 | 3 | 0 | 3 | 11 | 2 |
| (Italy) Unipolsai Bologna | 2 | 0 | 0 | 0 | 3 | 0 | 0 | 0 | X | 5 | 8 | 0 |
WP: (United States) Marquis Fleming (BOL) LP: (Netherlands) Orlando Yntema (NEP) Sv: (Italy) Nick Pugliese (BOL); Attendance: 2,500; Umpires: HP − (Germany) Waider, 1B − (Italy) Fabrizi, 2B − (Czech Republic) Pribyl, 3B − (Italy) De Notta; Boxscore

Game 2

August 8 19:30 at Familiestadion
| Team | 1 | 2 | 3 | 4 | 5 | 6 | 7 | 8 | 9 | R | H | E |
|---|---|---|---|---|---|---|---|---|---|---|---|---|
| (Italy) Unipolsai Bologna | 0 | 0 | 0 | 1 | 0 | 0 | 0 | 1 | 0 | 2 | 6 | 1 |
| (Netherlands) Curaçao Neptunus | 0 | 0 | 1 | 0 | 0 | 0 | 1 | 1 | X | 3 | 4 | 1 |
WP: (Netherlands) Loek van Mil (NEP) LP: (Venezuela) Raul Rivero (BOL) Sv: none Attendance: 1,600; Umpires: HP − (Slovakia) Jankovic, 1B − (Germany) Posny, 2B − (Netherlands) Berkvens, 3B − (Netherlands) van Heijningen; Boxscore

Game 3

August 9 12:00 at Familiestadion
| Team | 1 | 2 | 3 | 4 | 5 | 6 | 7 | 8 | 9 | R | H | E |
|---|---|---|---|---|---|---|---|---|---|---|---|---|
| (Italy) Unipolsai Bologna | 0 | 0 | 1 | 1 | 0 | 0 | 0 | 0 | 2 | 3 | 7 | 1 |
| (Netherlands) Curaçao Neptunus | 2 | 0 | 0 | 5 | 0 | 0 | 0 | 0 | X | 7 | 10 | 0 |
WP: (Belgium) Kenny van den Branden (NEP) LP: (Italy) Riccardo De Santis (BOL) Sv: none Attendance: 1,000; Umpires: HP − (Germany) Posny, 1B − (Slovakia) Jankovic, 2B − (Netherlands) van Heijningen, 3B − (Netherlands) Berkvens; Boxscore

== Statistics leaders ==
=== Batting ===
| Statistic | Name | Total/Avg |
|---|---|---|
| Batting average | (Venezuela) Guillermo Rodriguez (BOL) | .632 |
| Hits | (Netherlands) Stijn van der Meer (NEP) | 16 |
| Runs | (Italy) Alessandro Vaglio (BOL) | 12 |
| Home runs | (United States) Tanner Leighton (SOL) | 2 |
| RBI | (United States) Tanner Leighton (SOL) (Italy) Alessandro Vaglio (BOL) | 11 |
| Walks | (Netherlands) Raily Legito (NEP) | 8 |
| Stolen bases | 3 players | 4 |
| On-base percentage | (Venezuela) Edgar Mundarain (RIM) | .563 |
| Slugging percentage | (United States) Tanner Leighton (SOL) | .800 |
| OBPS | (Venezuela) Guillermo Rodriguez (BOL) | 1.456 |

=== Pitching ===
| Statistic | Name | Total/Avg |
|---|---|---|
| Wins | 3 players | 3 |
| Losses | (Belarus) Aliaksei Lukashevich (BRE) (Germany) Luke Sommer (HEI) | 2 |
| Saves | (Italy) Nick Pugliese (BOL) | 1 |
| Innings pitched | (Venezuela) Paul Rivero (BOL) | 19.0 |
| Hits allowed | (Czech Republic) Radim Chroust | 18 |
| Runs allowed | (Belarus) Aliaksei Lukashevich (BRE) | 11 |
| Earned runs allowed | (Czech Republic) Radim Chroust | 10 |
| ERA | 4 players | 0.00 |
| Walks | (Belarus) Kiryl Kaslouski (BRE) (Belarus) Aliaksei Lukashevich (BRE) | 8 |
| Strikeouts | (France) Leonel Cespedes (SEN) | 16 |
| WHIP | (Italy) Andrea Pizziconi (SMR) | 0.50 |

== See also ==
- European Baseball Championship
- Asia Series
- Caribbean Series
- Baseball awards § Europe
