= Allard Baird =

American baseball executive

- Born: November 8, 1961 (age 64); Rochester, New Hampshire, U.S.

Teams
- Kansas City Royals (1988–2006); Boston Red Sox (2006–2018); New York Mets (2018–2020); Arizona Diamondbacks (2021–2023)

Career highlights and awards
- 3× World Series champion (2007, 2013, 2018)
Medals
Men's baseball
Coach for Italy
European Championship
Silver medal – second place	2025 Rotterdam	Team

Allard Paul Baird (/ˈælərd ˈbɛərd/; born November 8, 1961) is an American professional baseball executive. He was the general manager for the Kansas City Royals from 2000 to 2006 and has held other executive positions for the Royals, Boston Red Sox, New York Mets, and Arizona Diamondbacks.

== Early years ==
Baird grew up in Rochester, New Hampshire, where he played baseball for the Spaulding High School Red Raiders. He played college baseball at Southern Arkansas University (SAU) in 1985, coached at SAU in 1986, and then was the head coach at Broward Community College in 1987.

Baird was inducted into the Rochester Sports Hall of Fame in 2005 and the SAU Muleriders hall of fame in 2012.

== Career ==
=== Kansas City Royals ===
Baird spent 18 years in the Kansas City Royals organization, starting as the hitting coach for Class A Appleton of the Midwest League in 1988. He became a scout in 1990 then served as an assistant to the general manager (GM) (1998) and assistant GM (1999–2000).

Baird replaced Herk Robinson as the Royals' GM on June 17, 2000. Baird's job was a difficult one: taking a small-market, losing-record team and trying to compete against teams like the Cleveland Indians and Chicago White Sox.

During his six full years as GM, Baird traded away popular players Johnny Damon, Carlos Beltrán, and Jermaine Dye with many Royal fans feeling that the team didn't get equal value. He also signed free agent Juan González to a one-year, $4 million contract, but he played only 33 games due to a back injury.

After a poor start to the 2006 season, Baird was fired on May 31 and replaced by Dayton Moore. During Baird's tenure, the team amassed a win–loss record of 381–576 (.398), including three 100-loss seasons and only one winning season (2003). The Royals led MLB in hits for the 2000 season.

=== Boston Red Sox ===
Baird joined the Boston Red Sox in 2006 as an assistant to the general manager after his firing in Kansas City, and later was named vice president and director of professional scouting. Baird later became the senior vice president of player personnel, serving under president of baseball operations Dave Dombrowski. The Red Sox won the World Series three times during Baird's time with the team, in 2007, 2013, and 2018.

=== New York Mets ===
On November 28, 2018, Baird was hired by the New York Mets to work for new general manager Brodie Van Wagenen. He performed that role until November 6, 2020.

=== Arizona Diamondbacks ===
Baird joined the Arizona Diamondbacks in June 2021 as a special assistant to general manager Mike Hazen as Hazen took a leave of absence. Baird worked for the Diamondbacks through the 2023 season.

=== International baseball ===
Baird was on the selection committee for the U.S. national team's roster for the 2000 Summer Olympics.

Baird has also been active in baseball in Italy. He has coached Fiorentina in the Italian Baseball League. He has also been on the Italian national team's staff, serving as a bench coach as Italy finished in second at the 2025 European Championship.

== Personal life ==
Baird is married. He has resided in Miami and Florence, Italy.

Preceded by Herk Robinson	Kansas City Royals General manager 2000–2006	Succeeded by Dayton Moore
