= Euro League Baseball =

Former baseball league in Europe

- Sport: Baseball
- Founded: 2015
- First season: 2016
- Folded: 2016
- No. of teams: 3
- Countries: Czech Republic (1 team); Germany (2 teams)
- Continent: Europe
- Last champion: Draci Brno

Euro League Baseball (ELB) was a professional baseball league in Europe founded by the European Association of Professional Baseball (EAPB) which played a single season in 2016. The winner of the ELB was awarded the Gregory Halman Trophy. ELB played its inaugural season in 2016 with three teams: Draci Brno, Haar Disciples and Buchbinder Legionäre Regensburg. The league's only championship was awarded to Draci Brno.

== Organization ==
EAPD held a 60% stake in Euro League Baseball Ltd. which is the operator of the EBL and holds all naming and media rights as well as all partnership and sponsor contracts regarding Euro League Baseball. EAPB President Wim van den Hurk was the CEO of Euro League Baseball Ltd.

== Teams ==
Team	City/Nation	Stadium	Capacity	Founded	Joined
Active in 2016
Draci Brno	Brno, Czech Republic	Městský Baseball Stadion	500	1972	2015
Munich-Haar Disciples	Munich, Germany	Disciples Ballpark	600	1990	2015
Buchbinder Legionäre	Regensburg, Germany	Armin-Wolf-Arena	4,600	1987	2015
Announced but never active
L&D Amsterdam	Amsterdam, Netherlands	Sportpark Ookmeer	400	1959	—
Unipol Bologna	Bologna, Italy	Stadio Gianni Falchi	2,500	1953	—
Bonn Capitals	Bonn, Germany	Capitals Ballpark	1,500	1989	—
Curaçao Neptunus	Rotterdam, Netherlands	Neptunus Familiestadion	2,760	1943	—
Rouen Huskies	Rouen, France	Stade Saint-Exupéry	500	1976	—
T&A San Marino	Serravalle, San Marino	Stadio di Baseball di Serravalle	1,500	1985	—
Templiers de Sénart	Sénart, France	Stade de Baseball	1,000	1987	—

Euro League Baseball teams (active in 2016,: never active)

== 2016 season ==
The inaugural ELB season in 2016 was contested by three teams: Draci Brno, Haar Disciples, Buchbinder Legionäre Regensburg. Each team played a total of 8 regular season games (4 at home and 4 away) between April and July.

=== Amsterdam Baseball ===
A team called Amsterdam Baseball was founded with the purpose to compete in ELB, and to be run by the league. The backbone of the team was supposed to be players from Amsterdam Pirates, but also some previously retired players like Dirk van 't Klooster and Chris Mowday. However, when the season was already well underway, Amsterdam Baseball had to withdraw from the league due to pressure from the European and Dutch baseball federations. This left the league with only three teams for its inaugural season.

=== Standings ===
Pos	Team	Pld	HW	HL	AW	AL	GB	PCT
1	Draci Brno	8	2	2	4	0	—	.750
2	Regensburg Legionäre	8	2	2	1	3	3	.375
3	Munich-Haar Disciples	8	2	2	1	3	3	.375

== See also ==
- Baseball Champions League Europe
- Baseball awards#Europe
