= A.S.D. Rajo Rho Baseball =

Baseball club in Rho, Italy

A.S.D. Rajo Rho Baseball, or Rajo Rho, or simply Rajo, is an amateur baseball club based in Rho, a city near Milan in the Italian region Lombardy. As of 2009 it competes in Seria B.

It was formed in 1988 in nearby Bollate as Rajo Ambrosiana Baseball Bollate, through the fusion of Ambrosiana Bollate Baseball (founded in 1968) with Rajo Deportivo Baseball Bollate (founded 1976). The following tear a merger took place with Rho Baseball (founded 1974); the club's name became Rajo-Rho and the club moved to Rho. In 1993 the team achieved promotion from Serie C-1 to Serie B. They were relegated at the end of the season but returned in 1995 and remained there for a number of years.

From 2001 Rajo also went under the name of Rajo-Saim, with reference to its sponsors. In 2002 the team achieved promotion to Serie A2. In its first season it finished tenth out twelve, avoiding relegation. In the following season Rajo made it to the play-offs and achieved promotion to Serie A1, the premier baseball league in Italy, through a 3–1 victory over Imola.

The 2004 season, when their key players included the Panamanians, Jaime Jaen and Carlos Muñoz and former Olympian Luigi Carrozza, was the only one in which Saim Rho have competed in Serie A1. They had a .111 winning percentage (a 6–48 record) and finished last in the league.

In 2005 the club changed its name to Associazione Sportiva Dilattantistica Rajo Rho Baseball.
