= Jack Lazorko =

American baseball player (born 1956)

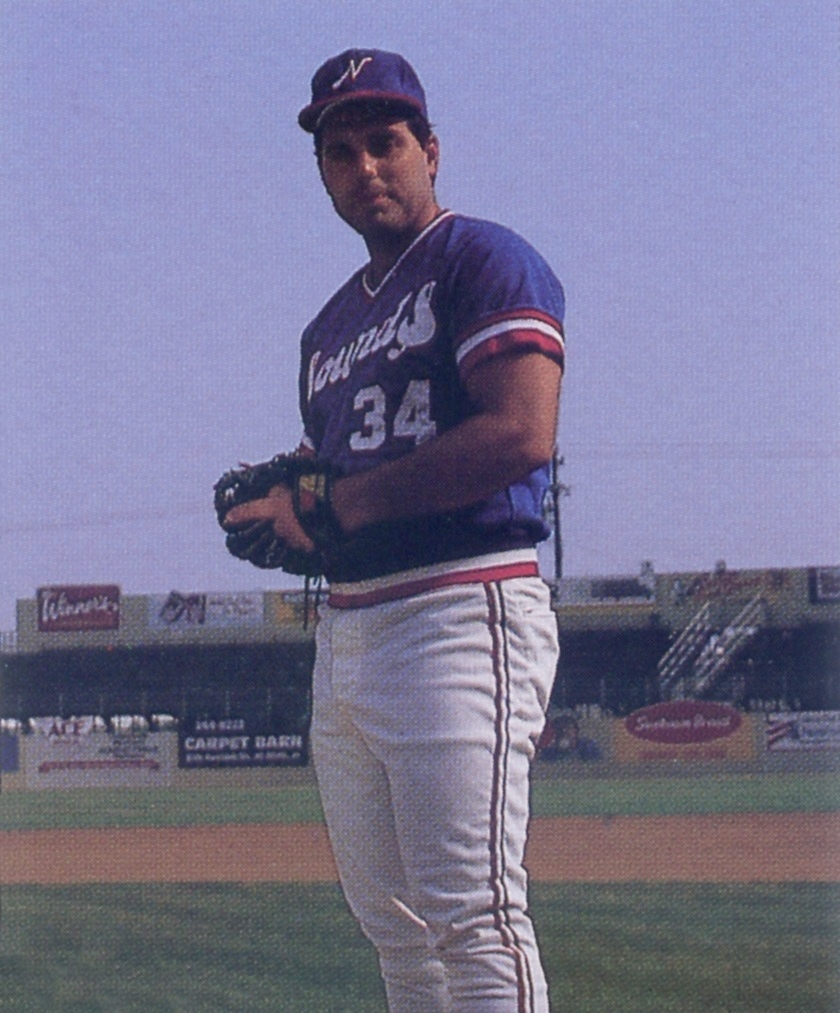
- Lazorko with the Nashville Sounds in 1986
- Pitcher
- Born: March 30, 1956 (age 70); Hoboken, New Jersey, U.S.
- Batted: Right Threw: Right

MLB debut
- June 4, 1984, for the Milwaukee Brewers

Last MLB appearance
- September 27, 1988, for the California Angels

MLB statistics
- Win–loss record: 5–8
- Earned run average: 4.22
- Strikeouts: 108
- Stats at Baseball Reference

Teams
- Milwaukee Brewers (1984); Seattle Mariners (1985); Detroit Tigers (1986); California Angels (1987–1988)

Jack Thomas Lazorko (born March 30, 1956) is an American former professional baseball pitcher. He played five seasons at the major league level for the Milwaukee Brewers, Seattle Mariners, Detroit Tigers and California Angels of Major League Baseball (MLB).

== Career ==
Born in Hoboken, Lazorko grew up in River Edge, New Jersey. He attended Miami Dade College, thenMississippi State University, and in 1976, he played collegiate summer baseball with the Cotuit Kettleers of the Cape Cod Baseball League. He was inducted into the Mississippi State Bulldogs hall of fame in 1997.

The Houston Astros selected Lazorko in the 11th round of the 1978 MLB draft. He played his first professional season with their Rookie league Gulf Coast Astros and Class A-Advanced Daytona Beach Astros in 1978. In June 1979, the Texas Rangers bought his contract, though he was released in 1983. He caught on with Milwaukee, who promoted him to the majors that June. He was 0–1 with 1 save in his first MLB season.

Lazorko continued moving along teams, signed with the San Francisco Giants ahead of the 1985 team, then having the Mariners purchase hours contract and bring him back to the majors. He spent 1986 with Detroit, then his final two MLB seasons with the Angels. He won his first MLB game in June 1987 with the Angels, four years after his MLB debut. He joked after the game that he was trying to catch teammate Don Sutton, who won 300 games.

Lazorko played 20 seasons in American and international baseball, including the Parma Baseball Club and Milan in Italy and the Senior Professional Baseball Association in Florida until 1995. With Parma, he was the MVP of the Italian League in 1991.

Lazorko, who was also a hockey goaltender in high school, is known for a highlight reel of his fielding that was featured on This Week in Baseball for many years. On the telecast of the New York Mets game of July 21, 2015, Ron Darling, himself a Gold Glove winner in the National League, called Lazorko "the best fielding pitcher" he had ever seen. (Darling played against Lazorko in the Texas League in 1981.)

After his playing career, Lazorko worked for the Texas Louisiana Baseball League and was a baseball broadcaster. He also worked for the Rangers.

== Personal life ==
Lazorko is married and has three children. During his playing career, his family resided in Texas. Lazorko's brother attended his first MLB win.
