= Frailyn Florián =

- Pitcher
- Born: July 25, 1982 (age 43); Gaspar Hernández, Dominican Republic
- Bats: Left Throws: Left
- Stats at Baseball Reference

Frailyn S. Florián Padilla (born July 25, 1982) is a Dominican-Italian professional baseball outfielder for the T & A San Marino of the Italian Baseball League.

Florián also played for the Italy national baseball team at the 2017 World Baseball Classic and with the Orel Anzio of the Italian League.
