= Antonio Noguera =

Spanish baseball player (born 1988)

Nettuno Baseball City
- Pitcher
- Born: Antonio Noguera Rodríguez; 26 February 1988 (age 38); Caracas, Venezuela
- Bats: Right Throws: Right
- Stats at Baseball Reference

Antonio Noguera Rodríguez (born 26 February 1988) is a Venezuelan professional baseball player who plays as a pitcher for Italian Baseball League club Nettuno Baseball City. Born in Venezuela, he represents Spain internationally.

== Career ==
Rodriguez signed as an amateur free agent by the Houston Astros in 2005 and started his career with their Venezuelan Summer League team. After playing in the Astros low minors through 2009 he was released. He played in Spain for the Marins Puerto Cruz in 2010 and played in Italy for the Novara United in 2011–2012.

== International career ==
Noguera played for the Spain national baseball team in the 2009 Baseball World Cup, 2010 European Championship, 2013 World Baseball Classic, and the 2019 European Baseball Championship. He then played for the team at the Africa/Europe 2020 Olympic Qualification tournament, in Italy in September 2019.
