= Justin Cicatello =

- Pitcher
- Born: March 6, 1984 (age 41)
- Bats: Right Throws: Right
- Stats at Baseball Reference
Medals
Men's baseball
Representing Italy
European Baseball Championship
Gold medal – first place	2010 Germany	National team

Justin Cicatello (born March 6, 1984) is a professional baseball pitcher, who is currently with Parma Baseball in the Italian Baseball League.

He played amateur baseball at Kenmore West Senior High School, Florida State College at Jacksonville and the University of Pittsburgh.

He was not selected by any Major League clubs so he signed with the Kalamazoo Kings of the Frontier League in 2007. In 2010, he joined the Italian Baseball League's Parma club after a brief period in Serie A2.

He was on the roster for the Italy national baseball team at the 2013 World Baseball Classic. He currently pitches for the Toronto Maple Leafs of the Intercounty Baseball League based out of Southern Ontario(www.theibl.ca)
