= Alex Romero =

Venezuelan baseball player (born 1983)

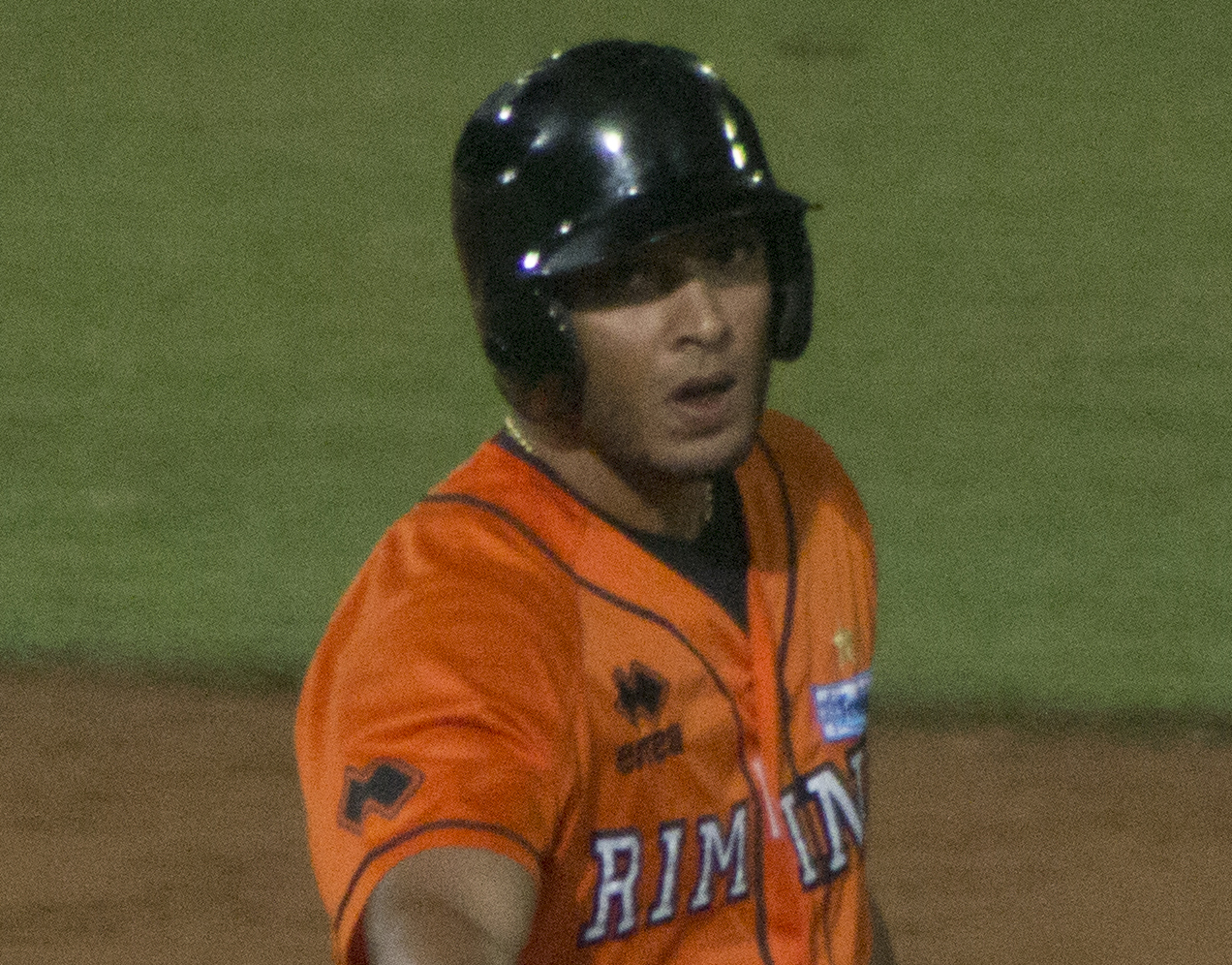
- Romero with Rimini Baseball
- Outfielder
- Born: September 9, 1983 (age 43); Maracaibo, Venezuela
- Batted: Left Threw: Right

MLB debut
- April 2, 2008, for the Arizona Diamondbacks

Last MLB appearance
- October 3, 2009, for the Arizona Diamondbacks

MLB statistics
- Batting average: .239
- Home runs: 2
- Runs batted in: 30
- Stats at Baseball Reference

Teams
- Arizona Diamondbacks (2008–2009)

Alexander Rafael Romero Galbán (born September 9, 1983) is a Venezuelan professional baseball outfielder with T&A San Marino of the Italian Baseball League (IBL). He played in Major League Baseball (MLB) for the Arizona Diamondbacks from 2008 to 2009.

== Career ==
Romero was born on September 9, 1983. After spending five years in the Minnesota Twins organization, he was claimed off waivers by the Arizona Diamondbacks on January 19, 2007. Romero began the 2008 season on the Diamondbacks' Opening Day roster

Romero made his major league debut on April 2, 2008, against the Cincinnati Reds, when he came in the game as a pinch hitter, making him the 217th Venezuelan-born player in Major League Baseball. He laid down a successful sacrifice bunt. The next day, Romero recorded his first career RBI, when he hit a sacrifice fly as a pinch hitter. For the season, he batted .230 with a .250 on-base percentage.

During the winter, Romero plays in his home country of Venezuela for the Aragua Tigers (Tigres de Aragua). On January 19, 2011, Romero signed a minor league contract with the Florida Marlins organization.

In 2012, while playing for Tigres de Quintana Roo of the Mexican League, Romero tested positive for doping and suspended for 50 games to serve in 2013. He played for Rimini Baseball of the Italian Baseball League in 2013, then he accepted to return to Rimini also for the 2014 season.

Romero signed a minor league contract with the San Francisco Giants on February 22, 2016.

Romero signed with the Rojos del Águila de Veracruz of the Mexican League for the start of the 2016 season. He was traded to the Toros de Tijuana on June 13, 2016, and later dealt to the Olmecas de Tabasco on November 17. Romero was released on June 27, 2017. On June 30, Romero signed with the Piratas de Campeche. He was released on July 7.

Romero returned to the Rimini Baseball Club for the 2018 season. He moved to T&A San Marino for the 2019 season.

Romero was suspended for 20 games for his assault on opposing catcher Gabriel Lino with his bat after being struck by a pitch in a Venezuelan Winter League game on January 9, 2020. After the game, he was quoted as saying “it’s about time us batters defended ourselves.”

== See also ==
- List of Major League Baseball players from Venezuela
