= Juan Carlos Infante =

Venezuelan baseball player (born 1981)

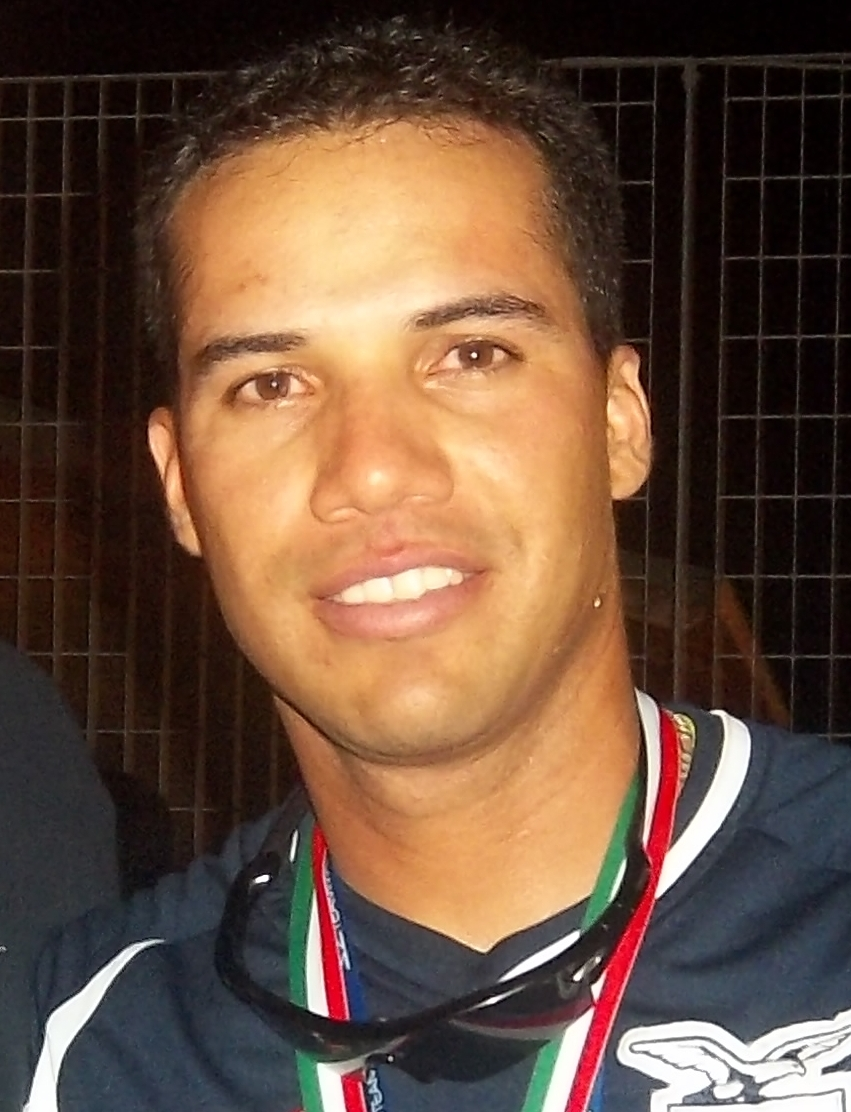
- Infante in 2012

Fortitudo Baseball Bologna
- Infielder
- Born: October 8, 1981 (age 45); Caracas, Venezuela
- Bats: Both Throws: Right
- Stats at Baseball Reference
Medals
Men's baseball
Representing Italy
European Baseball Championship
Gold medal – first place	2010 Germany	National team

Juan Carlos Infante (born October 8, 1981) is a Venezuelan-Italian professional baseball infielder, for the Fortitudo Baseball Bologna in the Italian Baseball League.

== Playing career ==
Infante played in the Gulf Coast League for the Montreal Expos in 1999 and 2000 then in the All-American Association for the Fort Worth Cats in 2001, the Northeast League for the New Jersey Jackals in 2004, the Canadian-American Association for the Ottawa Rapides in 2008 and the Golden Baseball League for the Edmonton Cracker-Cats in 2008 before going to Italy.

He also played for the Italy national baseball team in the 2013 World Baseball Classic and with the Orel Anzio of the Italian League.
