= Jaime Jaen =

Panamanian baseball player

Medal record

Representing Panama

Men's Baseball

Baseball World Cup
Bronze medal – third place	2005 Rotterdam	Team

Jaime Gustavo Jaen Gutierrez (born October 4, 1978) is a Panamanian baseball player who has played on the Panama national baseball team.

In 2004, he played for Saim Rho in Serie A1, the highest level of professional baseball in Italy. He also participated in the 2005 Baseball World Cup (hitting .349), the 2006 COPABE Olympic Qualifier (hitting .160), the 2006 Central American and Caribbean Games (hitting .105) and the 2008 Americas Baseball Cup (hitting .333).
