= Francesco Casolari =

Italian baseball player (born 1965)

Francesco Casolari (born 4 October 1965) is an Italian baseball player who competed for Italy in three Summer Olympics, in 1996, 2000, and 2004. He also was on Italy's roster for three European Baseball Championships, winning the tournament in 1997 and finishing second in 1995 and 1999. He also played club baseball in Italy for Juventus Torino, Caffè Danesi Nettuno, and Grosseto Orioles.
