= Herk Robinson =

American baseball executive (born 1941)

Spencer "Herk" Robinson (born 1941) is a retired American front office executive in Major League Baseball. He served for almost a decade as general manager of the Kansas City Royals, from October 10, 1990, through June 17, 2000, and was an executive in the Royals' front office for almost 35 years.

Robinson attended the University of Miami and Washington University in St. Louis. He entered baseball with the Cincinnati Reds in 1964 as secretary of minor league clubs and switched to the Baltimore Orioles after the 1968 season. In December 1969, Robinson joined the year-old Royals as assistant director of scouting and began a steady rise through the Kansas City organization, switching from baseball to business operations in 1980. After ten seasons as the Royals' top administrator, he was given the general manager role when John Schuerholz departed for the Atlanta Braves following the 1990 campaign.

However, Robinson's tenure as top baseball executive in Kansas City was marked by the club's continued decline from perennial contender to also-ran in the American League West Division and, after 1993, the AL Central. The team's original owner, Ewing Kauffman, died in 1993, and Robinson presided during a transitional period before the club was purchased by former Wal-Mart CEO David Glass. The Royals recorded only three over-.500 seasons during that period, and lost 90 games or more three times, including in Robinson's final full season, 1999.

After his replacement by Allard Baird, Robinson became the team's executive vice president and chief operating officer. He retired from that position in May 2004, although he began the 2010 season still associated with the Royals as a member of the club's board of directors.

Preceded by John Schuerholz	Kansas City Royals General Manager; 1990–2000	Succeeded by Allard Baird
