= Serravalle, San Marino =

Castello of San Marino

Serravalle Saravâl (Romagnol)
- Castello
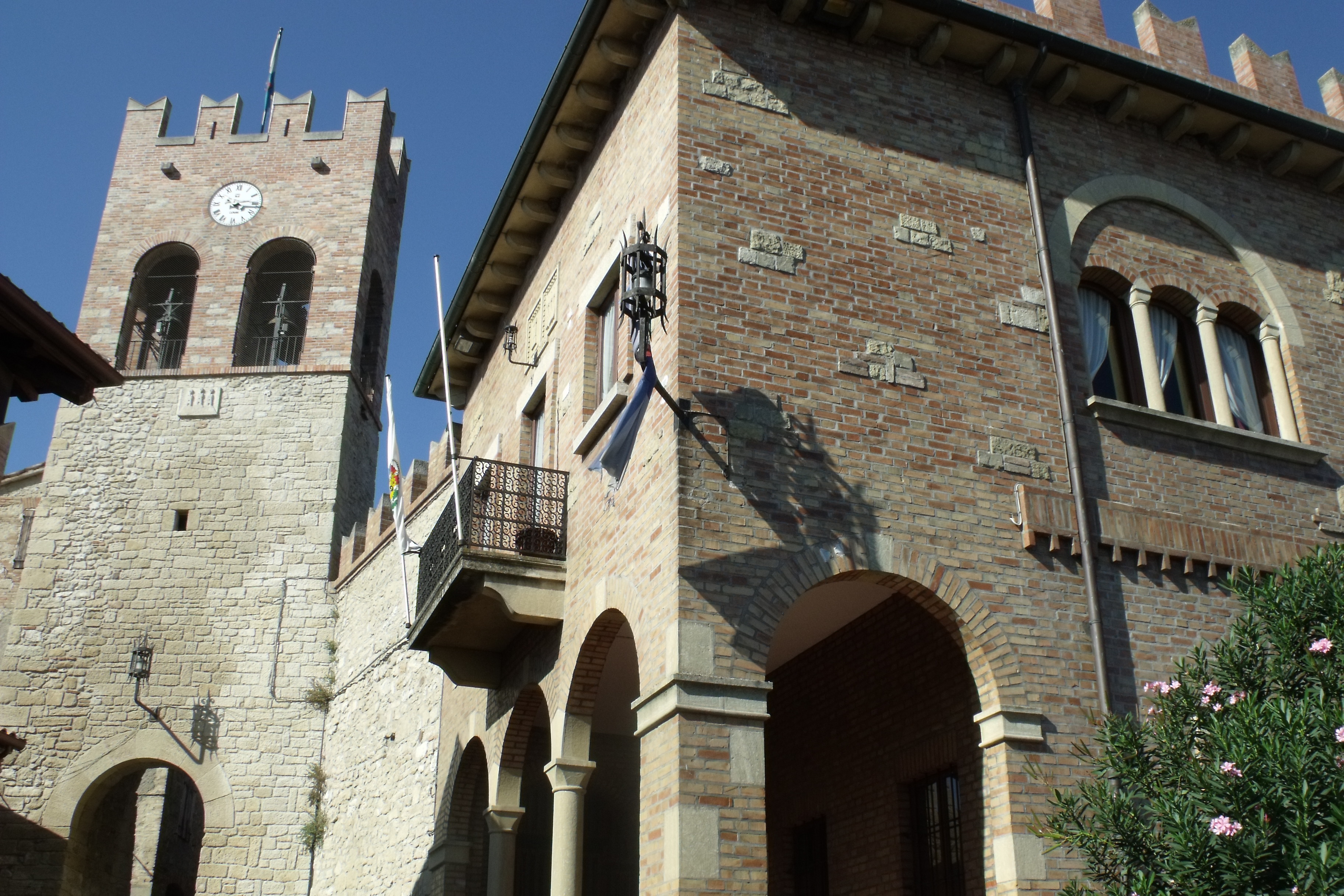
- The castle of Serravalle

- Flag Coat of arms

- Serravalle's location in San Marino

- Location within San Marino
- Coordinates: 43°58′18″N 12°28′54″E
- Country: San Marino
- Curazie: List: Cà Ragni, Cinque Vie, Dogana, Falciano, Lesignano, Ponte Mellini, Rovereta, Valgiurata

Government
  - Capitano: Andrea Crescentini (Insieme per Serravalle/Libera; since 2025)

Area
  - Total: 10.53 km^{2} (4.07 sq mi)
- Elevation: 148 m (486 ft)

Population (January 2025)
  - Total: 11,226
- Time zone: UTC+1 (CET)
  - Summer (DST): UTC+2 (CEST)
- Postal code: 47899
- Climate: Cfa
- Website: https://www.gov.sm/pub1/GovSM/Istituzioni-e-Forze/Giunte-di-Castello/Castello-di-Serravalle.html

Serravalle (Romagnol: Saravâl) is one of the nine castelli of San Marino. It has a population of 11,226 inhabitants (of whom 2,000 are of foreign origin) and an area of 10.53 km^{2} (4 sq. mi.). It is both the most populated and densely populated municipality in San Marino, and contains its largest settlement (Dogana). Serravalle is located on the edge of the Apennine Mountains.

== Geography ==
The town borders on Sammarinese municipalities of Domagnano and Borgo Maggiore and the Italian municipalities Verucchio, Rimini and Coriano. Serravalle counts a surrounding quarter named Galazzano, where the weather station and an industrial area are located. Serravalle has San Marino's northernmost and lowest elevated points. The outer edge of Serravalle is about 10 kilometres (6.2 mi) from central Rimini and the Adriatic Sea.

Serravalle recorded a temperature of 40.3 °C (104.5 °F) on 3 and 9 August 2017, which is the highest temperature to have ever been recorded in San Marino.

Serravalle contains eight curazie: Cà Ragni, Cinque Vie, Dogana, Falciano, Lesignano, Ponte Mellini, Rovereta, and Valgiurata.

=== Climate ===
Serravalle has a humid subtropical climate (Köppen: Cfa).

Climate data for Serravalle
Month	Jan	Feb	Mar	Apr	May	Jun	Jul	Aug	Sep	Oct	Nov	Dec	Year
Mean daily maximum °C (°F)	8.7 (47.7)	10.0 (50.0)	13.0 (55.4)	16.4 (61.5)	21.0 (69.8)	25.9 (78.6)	28.5 (83.3)	28.2 (82.8)	23.6 (74.5)	19.2 (66.6)	14.0 (57.2)	9.9 (49.8)	18.2 (64.8)
Daily mean °C (°F)	6.0 (42.8)	6.9 (44.4)	9.8 (49.6)	13.1 (55.6)	17.7 (63.9)	22.4 (72.3)	24.9 (76.8)	24.4 (75.9)	20.1 (68.2)	16.0 (60.8)	11.3 (52.3)	7.3 (45.1)	15.0 (59.0)
Mean daily minimum °C (°F)	3.7 (38.7)	4.2 (39.6)	6.7 (44.1)	9.8 (49.6)	14.2 (57.6)	18.6 (65.5)	20.9 (69.6)	20.7 (69.3)	16.8 (62.2)	13.2 (55.8)	9.0 (48.2)	5.0 (41.0)	11.9 (53.4)
Average precipitation mm (inches)	57.1 (2.25)	65.9 (2.59)	66.0 (2.60)	64.5 (2.54)	69.7 (2.74)	42.0 (1.65)	37.2 (1.46)	49.1 (1.93)	77.0 (3.03)	81.2 (3.20)	84.8 (3.34)	72.5 (2.85)	767 (30.18)
Source: Weather.Directory

== History ==
First mentioned in a 962 document, in medieval times this town was called Castrum Olnani (later Olnano), meaning "the village of the elm trees". Serravalle attached to San Marino in 1463, during the last territorial expansion of the Republic.

In the Rimini earthquake on 16 August 1916, several houses in Serravalle collapsed. Two houses were damaged in the earlier earthquake on 17 May 1916.

== Points of interest ==
- Chiesa di Sant Andrea (Saint Andrea's Church), built in 1824 by Luigi Fonti
- San Marino Shrine, the first official Shinto shrine in Europe supported by the Jinja Honcho
- San Marino Stadium, originally called the Stadio Olimpico, despite not being a stadium built to house the Olympics, but rather local San Marino football games
- Stadio di Baseball di Serravalle, home ballpark for the T & A San Marino Baseball Club, which participates in the Italian Baseball League
- SM Hub (a.k.a. World Trade Center), in Dogana curazia, tallest building in San Marino at 129.5 ft (39.47 m)

== International relations ==
Serravalle is twinned with:

- Chiusi della Verna, Italy (1954)
- Huangshan, China (1999)
- Zakynthos, Greece (2014)
- Sulmona, Italy (2017)
- Tolentino, Italy (2020)
- Tel-Aviv, Israel (2017)
