= Mario Chiarini =

Italian baseball player (born 1981)

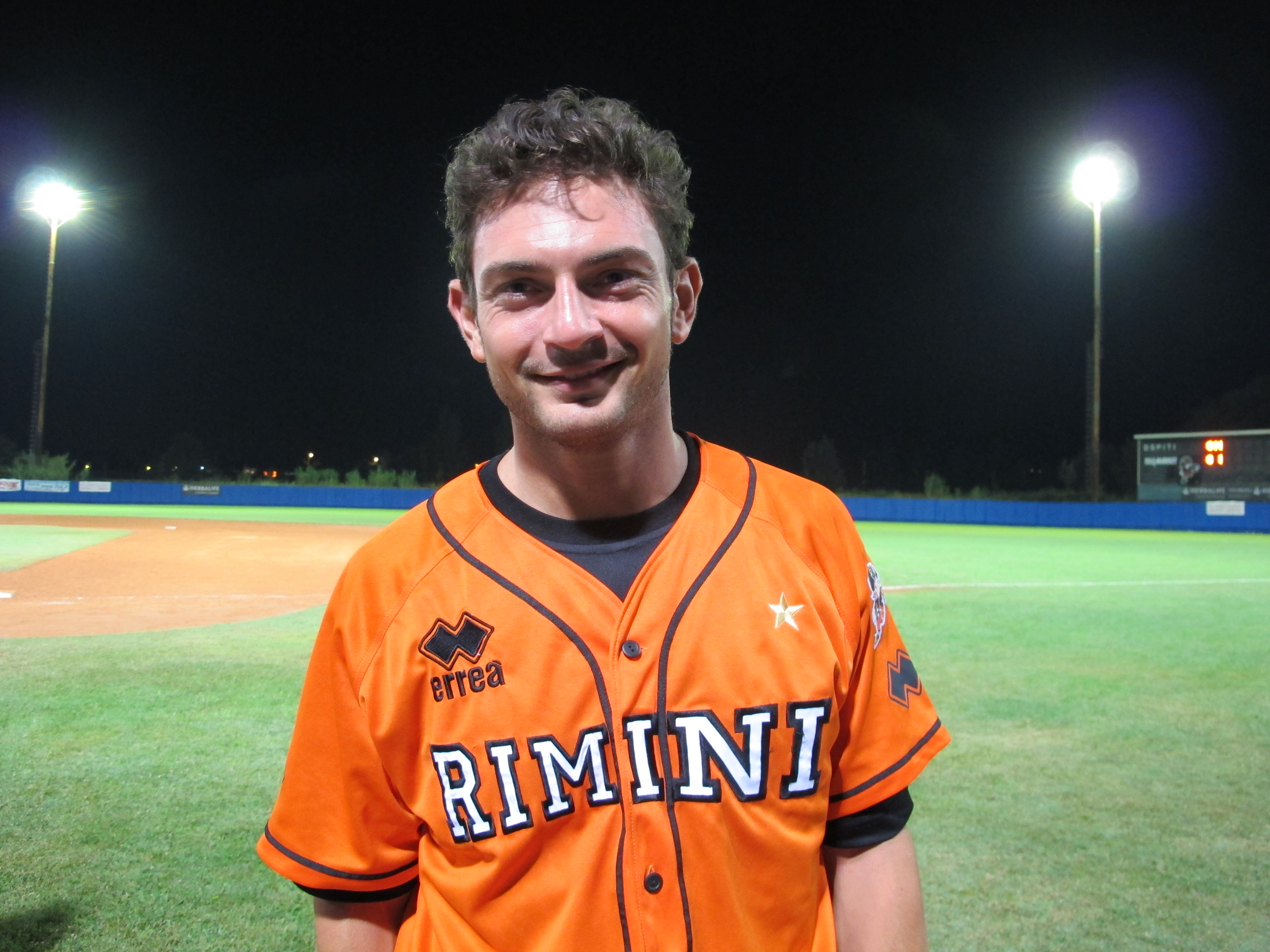
- Chiarini in Rimini Baseball colors

T&A San Marino – No. 45
- Outfielder
- Born: 7 January 1981 (age 45); Rimini, Italy
- Bats: Right Throws: Right

IBL debut
- 1997, for the Rimini Baseball
- Stats at Baseball Reference

Teams
- Rimini Baseball (1997–1999); Arizona League Mariners (2000); Rimini Baseball (2001–2014); T&A San Marino (2015–present)
Medals
Men's baseball
Representing Italy
Intercontinental Cup
Bronze medal – third place	2010 Chinese Taipei	Team
European Baseball Championship
Gold medal – first place	2010 Germany	Team
Gold medal – first place	2012 Netherlands	Team
Silver medal – second place	2014 Czech Republic and Germany	Team

Mario Chiarini (born 7 January 1981) is an Italian professional baseball player who competed in the 2004 Summer Olympics. He's the current captain of the Italian team.

== Career ==
=== Club ===
Mario Chiarini was 16 years old in his senior debut, in 1997, for his hometown team Rimini Baseball.

=== Minor league ===
Chiarini played for the Arizona League Mariners in 2000.

=== Back to club ===
After his stint with Mariners, Chiarini continued his career in Rimini from 2001 to 2015. With Rimini he won 3 Italian championships, and 2 national cups. Chiarini currently plays for the T&A San Marino.

=== International ===
Mario Chiarini has played for Italy national baseball team since 2002. He made the roster for the World Baseball Classic for the first time in 2009. He also represented his country in the 2013 edition.

At the 2009 World Baseball Classic, Chiarini made a spectacular diving catch to rob Bobby Abreu of an RBI. In the process of doing so, Chiarini suffered an embarrassing wardrobe malfunction: Mario's belt split in half.

As a member of national team, he won two European Baseball Championships, in 2010 and in 2012. He missed the 2016 edition because of an injury, to which manager Mazzieri said to be "strange to coach the team without him for the first time".
