= Marco Sabbatani =

Italian baseball player (born 1989)

A.S.D. Castenaso
- Catcher
- Born: 13 April 1989 (age 36); Ravenna, Italy
- Bats: Right Throws: Right
- Stats at Baseball Reference
Medals
Men's baseball
Representing Italy
European Baseball Championship
Bronze medal – third place	2016 Hoofddorp	National team

Marco Sabbatani (born 13 April 1989) is an Italian professional baseball catcher for A.S.D. Castenaso in the Italian Baseball League.

Sabbatani was selected as a member of the Italy national baseball team at the 2017 World Baseball Classic.
