= Giuseppe Mazzanti =

Italian baseball player (born 1983)

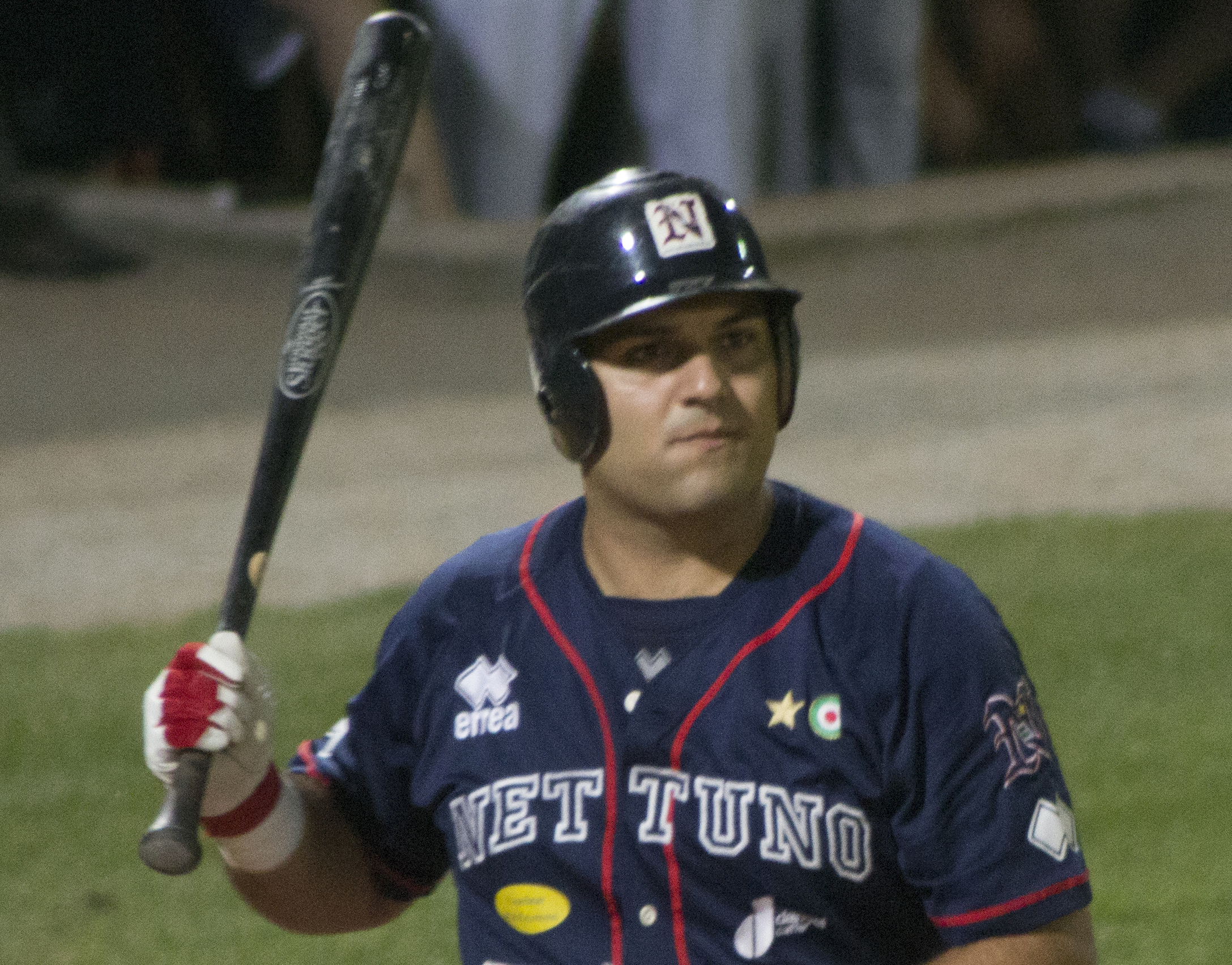
- Born: 4 May 1983 (age 43); Rome, Lazio, Italy
- Bats: right Throws: right

Career highlights and awards
- 2× Italian Baseball League MVP (2007, 2008); 1× Olympic participant (2004); 1× World Baseball Classic participant (2009)
Medals
Men's baseball
Representing Italy
European Baseball Championship
Gold medal – first place	2010 Germany	National team
Bronze medal – third place	2016 Hoofddorp	National team

Giuseppe Mazzanti (born 5 April 1983) is an Italian baseball player who competed in the 2004 Summer Olympics, 2009 World Baseball Classic, and 2019 European Baseball Championship. Mazzanti also had a brief stint with the minor league AZL Mariners of the Seattle Mariners franchise. Mazzanti has had most of his success in the Italian Baseball League where he was named MVP both in 2007 and 2008.

As a member of Italy national baseball team he won 2010 European Baseball Championship. He played for Team Italy in the 2019 European Baseball Championship. He played for the team at the Africa/Europe 2020 Olympic Qualification tournament, which took place in Italy beginning 18 September 2019.
