= Eugenio Pagnini =

Italian modern pentathlete (1905–1993)

Personal information
- Born: 13 July 1905 Forlì, Italy
- Died: 29 September 1993 (aged 88) Rimini, Italy

Sport
- Sport: Modern pentathlon

Eugenio Pagnini (13 July 1905 – 29 September 1993) was an Italian modern pentathlete. He competed at the 1928 and 1932 Summer Olympics.

After returning from a trip to the United States in 1949, Pagnini inspired the formation of the Rimini Baseball Club. He taught in Rimini's classical lyceum.
