= Milano BC 1946 =

Baseball team in Milan, Italy

Information
- League: Serie A (promoted 2024)
- Location: Milan, Italy
- Ballpark: Stadio J.F. Kennedy
- Established: 1946; 80 years ago
- Nickname: La rossoblù
- European Cup championships: 3 (1969, 1970, 1971)
- Scudetti: 8 (1958, 1960, 1961, 1962, 1966, 1967, 1968, 1970)
- Former name: Senators Milano (1950–1951); Cus Milano (1952–1959); Seven-Up Milano (1960); Europhon Milano (1961–1970); Ausonia Milano (1972–1973); Frendo Milano(1952–1959); Edilfonte Milano (1978–1980); Bkv Milano (1986–1989); Mediolanum Milano (1990–1993); Senago Milano United (2009–2016)
- Colors: Blue, red and white

The Milano Baseball Club 1946 is a professional baseball team that plays in the Italian Baseball League, based in the city of Milan. It is the oldest baseball club in Italy still in existence, and the only one to play in the country's first national championship in 1948.

A successful team in the Serie A1, Milano won eight championship titles in a span of 13 seasons, 1958; from 1960 through 1962; from 1966 to 1968 and 1970, all under manager Luigi Cameroni. Besides, Milano won three straight European Cups from 1969 to 1971.

During their existence, the Milano club produced two of the four batting Triple Crown winners in Italian baseball history – Roberto Gandini in 1962 and Roberto Bianchi in 1991.

== History ==
Milano BC was one of the first baseball clubs founded after the introduction of baseball to Italy in the aftermath of World War II. The team partiicpated in the first official game of the nascent Italian Baseball League on June 27, 1948, a crosstown derby against the rival Yankees Inter; the game, played at the Giuriati Field in front of 3,000 spectators, was ended in a tie score of 21-21 tie. The team was first managed by Elliott Van Zandt, a former American serviceman who remained in Italy after the war.

The team inaugurated its home ballpark, the Stadio J.F. Kennedy, in 1964; the stadium was nicknamed the "La Scala of baseball." Milano 46 dominated the Italian league in the late 1960s; playing under the name Europhon, the team won won three European Cups in a row in 1969, 1970 and 1971. This team was headliend by star Luigi "Gigi" Cameroni.

The club then entered a period of struggle and suffered several "self-relegations" to lower tier divisions for financial reasons. The club returned to glory in the early 1990s after merging with Polisportiva Mediolanum, winning two more Italian Cups (1990 and 1991), two Cup Winners' Cups (1991 and 1992), and a European Super Cup. After the Mediolanum era, the club fortunes again declined, and it fell out of the top division in 1998.

In 2009, the club merged with Senago BC to form Senago Milano United, a team which itself served as the secondary farm team for Novara BC. The goal was to secure a franchise in the abortive reorganization of Italian baseball by Major League Baseball in 2010, which briefly did away with promotion and relegation in favor of a closed league model. The combined team reached the playoff semi-finals in 2010, a season in which they also won the Italian Cup in their category against Reggio Emilia. The combined team dissolved in 2016.

Milano BC 1946 finally returned to top-flight baseball in 2021, after a promotion from third-division Serie B to second-division Serie A2 coincided with the expansion of Serie A. The team also made strides in its youth academy, one of the largest in Italy, with Nicolò Pinazzi becoming the first Milano prospect to sign with a Major League club (the Cincinnati Reds). The team was relegated, but returned to the top-flight of Serie A in 2024.

== Seasons ==
Milano BC 1946 top-flight record
Season	Finish	Postseason	Manager	Ref
1948	2nd	–	Max Ott	
1949	3rd	–	Ferdinando Zerbini	
1950	4th	–	Ferdinando Zerbini	
1951	7th	–	Ferdinando Zerbini	
1952	8th	–	Alfio D'Aprile	
1953	7th	–	Alfio D'Aprile	
1954	6th	–	Elliott Van Zandt	
1955	8th	Relegated to A2	Elliott Van Zandt	
1958	1st	Won championship	Elliott Van Zandt / Andrea Balzani / Luigi Cameroni	
1959	3rd	–	Luigi Cameroni	
1960	1st	Won championship	Luigi Cameroni	
1961	1st	Won championship	Luigi Cameroni	
1962	1st	Won championship	Luigi Cameroni	
1963	2nd	–	Luigi Cameroni	
1964	7th	–	Luigi Cameroni	
1965	2nd	–	Luigi Cameroni	
1966	1st	Won championship	Luigi Cameroni	
1967	1st	Won championship and Coppa Italia	Luigi Cameroni	
1968	1st	Won championship	Luigi Cameroni	
1969	4th	4th in European Cup	Luigi Cameroni	
1970	1st	Won championship and European Cup	Luigi Cameroni	
1971	4th	4th in European Cup	Luigi Cameroni	
1972	8th	–	Alberto Spinosa	
1973	4th	–	Dave Phares	
1974	3rd	–	Dave Phares	
1975	7th	Relegated to A2	Dave Phares	
1979	7th	–	Luigi Cameroni / Ennio Paganelli /Carlo Passarotto (	
1980	5th	Relegated to B	Carlo Passarotto / Giulio Sueri	
1983	7th	–	Carlo Passarotto	
1984	5th	Relegated to A2	Carlo Passarotto	
1986	5th	–	Ciccio Roda	
1987	7th	–	Ciccio Roda / Mauro Mazzotti	
1988	7th	–	Mauro Mazzotti	
1989	11th	–	Mauro Mazzotti	
1990	4th	4th in Coppa Italia	Mauro Mazzotti	
1991	4th	4th in Coppa Italia and Cup Winners' Cup	Mauro Mazzotti	
1992	4th	4th in Cup Winners' Cup and Super Cup	Mauro Mazzotti	
1993	5th	Relegated to C2	Mauro Mazzotti	
1998	7th	Relegated to B	Mauro Mazzotti	
2021	6th	Relegated to B	Marco Fraschetti	
2024	4th	–	Marco Fraschetti	
2025	2nd	Eliminated in round of 16 of playoffs	Marco Fraschetti	
