= Claudio Liverziani =

Italian baseball player (born 1975)

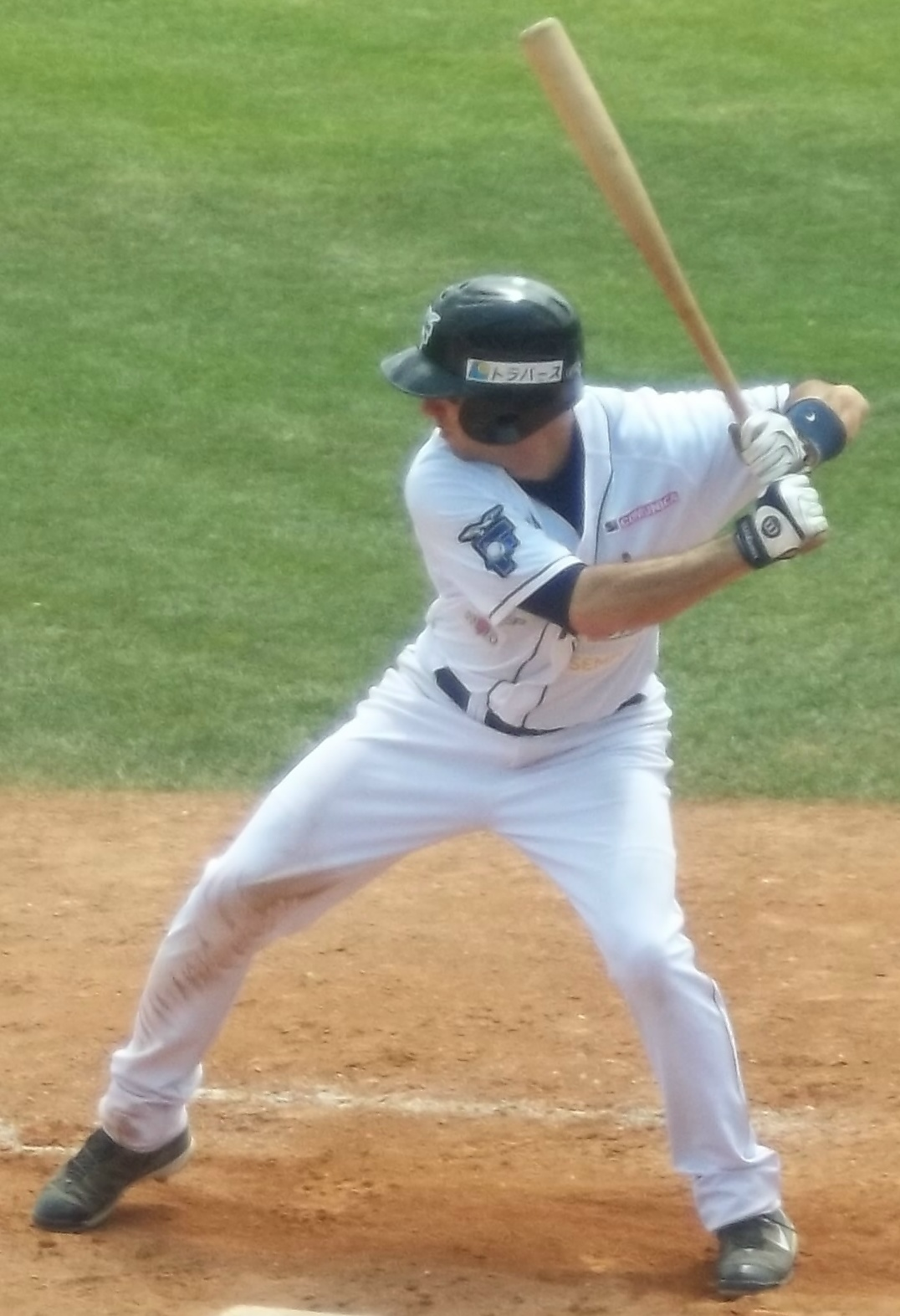
- Liverziani batting during the 2012 European Cup
- First baseman / Left fielder
- Born: 4 March 1975 (age 51); Novara, Italy
- Bats: Left Throws: Right
- Stats at Baseball Reference

Claudio Liverziani (born 4 March 1975) is an Italian former professional baseball player who competed in Minor League Baseball and for the Italian national team.

Liverziani made his professional debut in Italy at 16 years old before signing with the Seattle Mariners. In 1997 and 1998, Liverziani played for the Wisconsin Timber Rattlers in the Midwest League. He was released by the Mariners organization on or about April 1, 1999. He returned to Italy in 1999 and played in the Italian Baseball League until 2016, primarily for Bologna. In 2009, he recorded his 1,000th hit in the Italian league against Abe Alvarez. He was the seventh player to reach that mark. In December 2009, the Italian National Olympic Committee announced that Liverziani would be banned for two years due to a drug offense.

Liverziani represented Italy in the Summer Olympics in 1996, 2000 and 2004. In 2001, he played for Italy in the Baseball World Cup. He also competed in the 2006 World Baseball Classic.
