= José Escalona =

Venezuelan baseball player

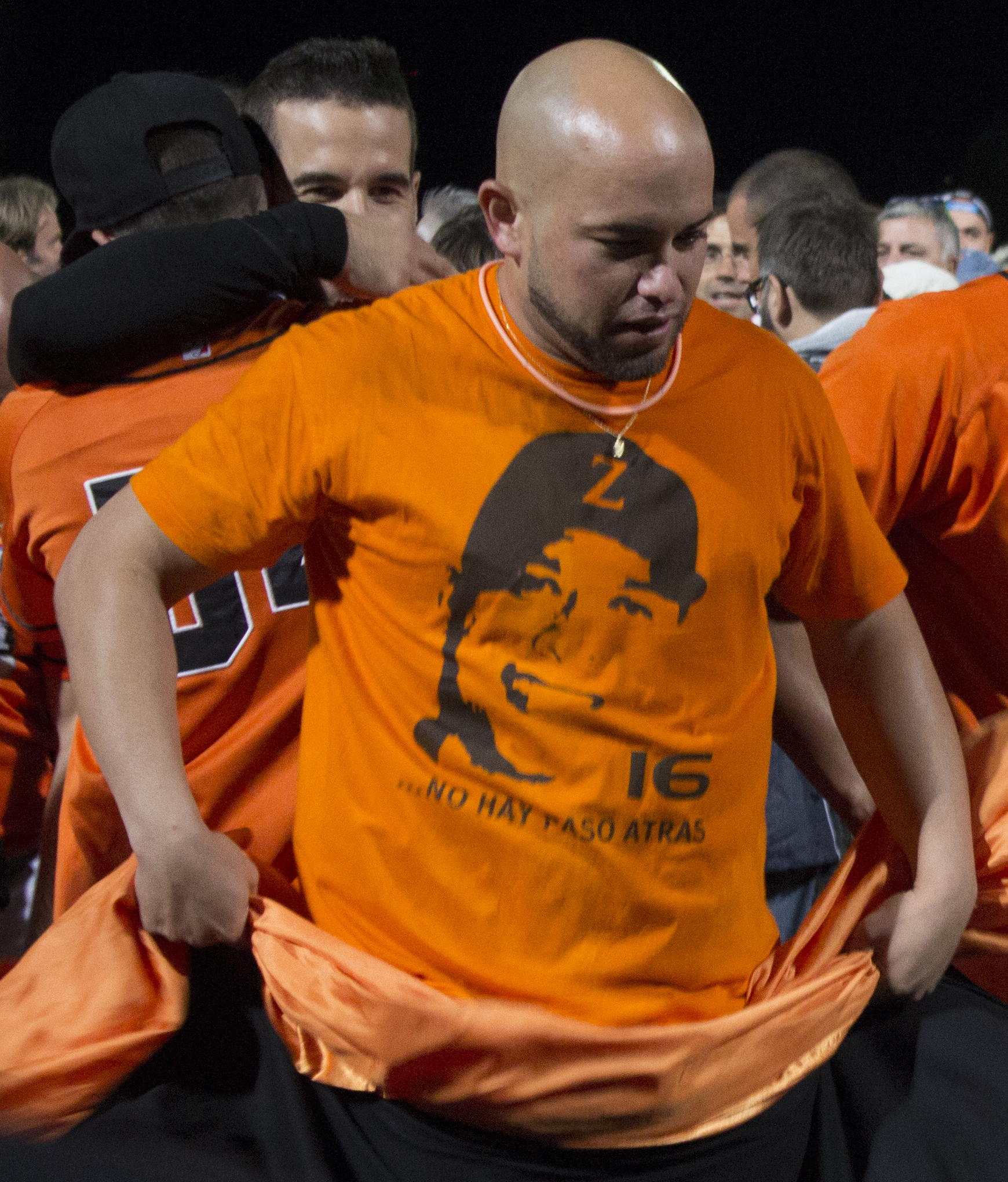
- Escalona with the Rimini

RANGERS REDIPIGLIA
- Pitcher
- Born: January 7, 1986 (age 40); Lara, Venezuela
- Bats: Left Throws: Left
- Stats at Baseball Reference
Medals
Men's baseball
Representing Italy
European Baseball Championship
Bronze medal – third place	2016 Hoofddorp	National team

José M. Escalona (born January 7, 1986) is a Venezuelan professional baseball pitcher for the Parmaclima Parma of the Italian Baseball League.

In addition, Escalona played for the Italy national baseball team at the 2017 World Baseball Classic.

== Personal ==
Escalona's grandfather is Italian, enabling him to become a naturalized Italian citizen.
