= Rimini Baseball Club =

The Rimini Baseball Club, nicknamed the Pirates (i Pirati), was a team that played in Serie A1 Italian Baseball League. The team was based in the city of Rimini and played its home games at the Stadio dei Pirati since 1973.

Rimini has won 13 national championships and three European Cups during its entire history.

The club participated in the first and highest-tier level of the Italian league pyramid until 2018, then did not participate to the following 2019 Serie A.

== History ==
The club was formed in 1949, inspired by Eugenio Pagnini, a modern pentathlete at the 1928 and 1932 Summer Olympics, who taught in Rimini's classical lyceum and had recently returned from a visit to the United States. The club initially played on a field by Rimini railway station and at the Stadio Romeo Neri.

In 1973, the club moved to a purpose-built stadium. Under the leadership of Rino Zangheri, the club reached its biggest years of notability, with players including Mike Romano, who left the club for Novara United in 2012. In 1979, the club changed its uniform from white and red (the same colours of Rimini FC 1912) to black and orange.

== Championship titles ==
- 1975; 1979; 1980; 1983; 1987; 1988; 1992; 1999; 2000; 2002; 2006; 2015; 2017

== European Cup titles ==
- 1976; 1979; 1989

== MLB alumni ==
- Manny Alexander
- Don August
- Yorman Bazardo
- Matt Beech
- Jim Brower
- Chuck Carr
- Ramón Castro
- Ivanon Coffie
- Chris Colabello
- Francisco Cruceta
- Mark DiFelice
- Mike Ekstrom
- Pete Falcone
- Tony Fiore
- Mark Funderburk
- Amaury García
- Brian Looney
- José Malavé
- Luis Maza
- Juan Melo
- Bry Nelson
- Dave Nilsson
- Ray Olmedo
- Elvis Peña
- Josh Phelps
- Dennis Rasmussen
- Willis Roberts
- Liu Rodríguez
- Alex Romero
- Mike Saipe
- Oscar Salazar
- Alex Serrano
- Jason Simontacchi
- Tom Urbani
- Jim Vatcher
- Rick Waits

== See also ==
- Rimini Baseball Club players
