= Grosseto Baseball Club =

BBC Grosseto
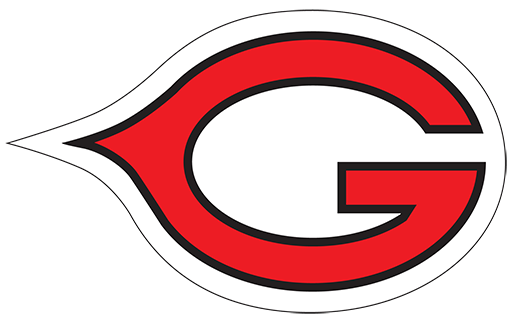
- Logo

Information
- League: Federal A
- Location: Grosseto, Tuscany
- Ballpark: Roberto Jannella Stadium
- Founded: 1952, then 2012
- Nickname: Gryphons
- European Cup championships: 2005
- Coppa Italia championships: 2004, 1999
- League championships: 1986, 1989, 2004, 2007
- Former league(s): Italian Baseball League, Serie A1, Serie B, Serie C
- Former ballpark: Simone Scarpelli Field
- Colors: Red, white
- Coach: Carlo Del Santo

Current uniforms
Home	Away

The Base Ball Club Grosseto (often simply called BBC Grosseto) is a baseball club based in the city of Grosseto in Tuscany ,Italy, founded in 1952.

== History ==
Grosseto BBC was previously a franchise in Italy's top professional competition, the Italian Baseball League. Grosseto was represented in the IBL's top league, Series A, by several teams with different nicknames over a span of nine seasons from 1999 to 2008. Teams from Grosseto won Series A titles in 1986, 1989, 2004, and 2007. The club also won Gold at the 2005 European Cup tournament.

The club was relegated to Series C after the 2011 season due to financial troubles. As a result, the franchise shut down after 60 years. In 2012 a new team was established to replace the old one under the name Grosseto Baseball. The restructured club rejoined the Italian Baseball League in 2013, though they were forced to play in Series C due to budget limitations. In 2014, Grosseto returned to Series A and won the league championship.

=== The early years of BBC Grosseto ===
BBC Grosseto was founded in 1952 from the remnants of the "Canarini" (The Canaries), a team formed immediately after the Second World War under the auspices of the American armed forces. The following year, the team was promoted to Serie B, thanks to skilled players such as Gei, Luciano Corridori, and the Biadi brothers, and began to face major teams like Milano, Torino, and Parma.

In 1954, Grosseto was relegated back to Serie C, also due to the very high costs of travel for away games, but in 1960 a new promotion led Grosseto back to Serie B.

=== The 1960s between A and B ===
At the end of the 1966 season, the team was promoted to Serie A. However, the terrible flood that devastated the city in November of that year forced the Biancorossi (the red and whites) to permanently abandon their historic field on Via Amiata. Starting with the 1967 season, the team began playing its home games at the municipal Olympic football stadium (the present-day Stadio Carlo Zecchini). Some matches were also played on a minor football field on Via Adda and even on Via della Repubblica, where the stands of the Stadio Roberto Jannella now stand. The team's first experience in the top division was not a successful one, and Grosseto was relegated back to Serie B until 1970, when they achieved a new promotion.

=== The peak years of the 1970s and early 1980s ===
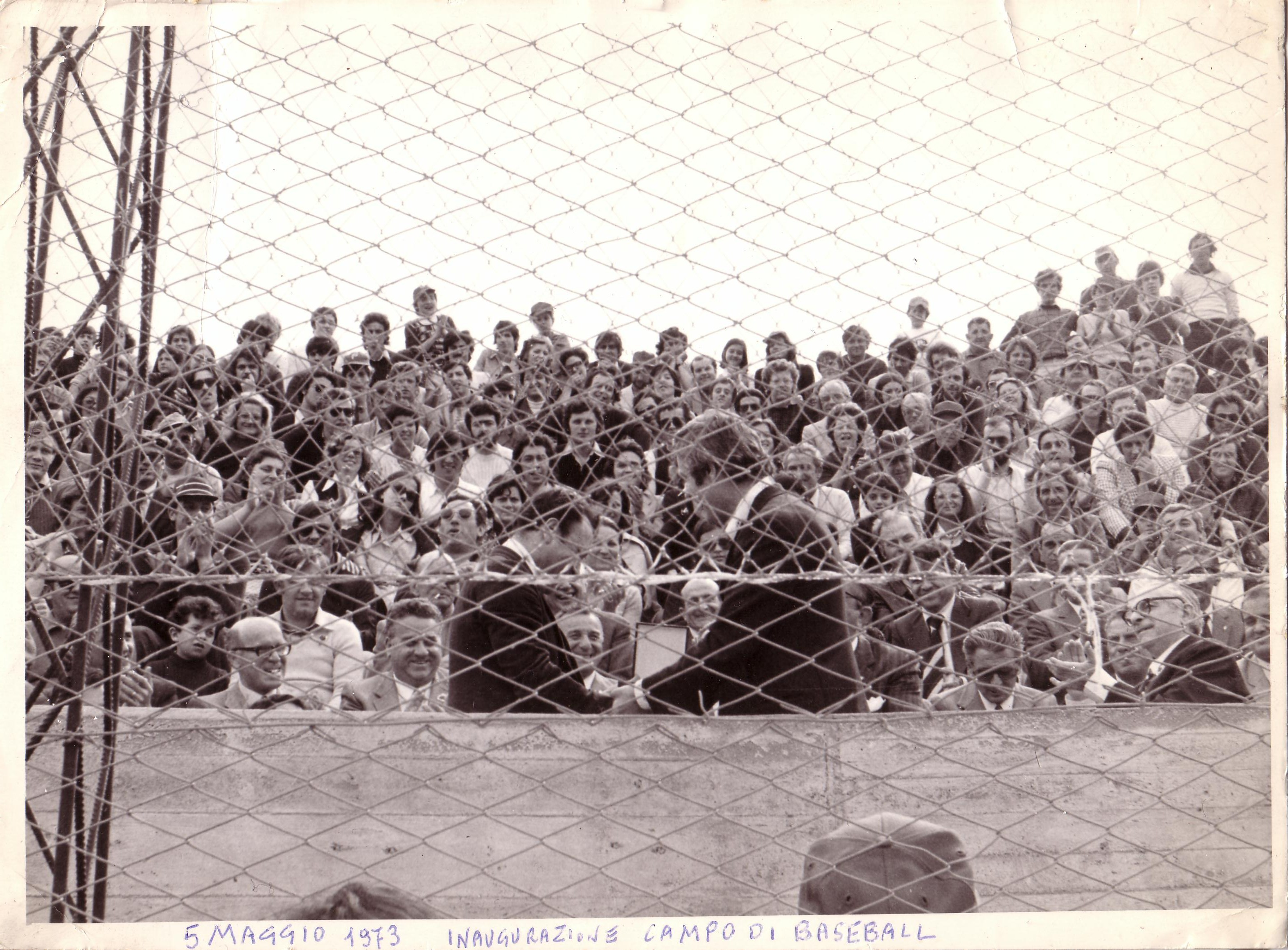
The inauguration of Jannella Stadium

The following season saw the emergence of Beppe Massellucci, the iconic Biancorossi player of the 70s and 80s, but this was not enough to save Grosseto from relegation, which was only avoided due to a repechage that allowed the team to remain in Serie A. It was in 1972 that the team signed its first foreign player, who captured the hearts of Grosseto: a first baseman who remains fondly remembered, John Self. Decades later, his statistics remain impressive; his sensational slugging percentage of 1.125 still stands as a record for the Italian league.

Due to Self's feats, baseball became one of the most popular sports in the city, and the "Roberto Jannella" baseball stadium was built. It has hosted BBC Grosseto's home games ever since.

The 1970s saw the growth of the Maremma-based team, which could rely on key players such as Riccardo Luongo, Luciano Varricchio, and foreign players like Irving Homs, who replaced Self starting in 1973. Once again, the team faced economic problems and at the end of the 1978 season was relegated to the lower series, where it remained for only one year before returning permanently to the top tier of Italian baseball.

Thanks also to a high-level player like Joseph Martelli, the Grosseto public rediscovered its passion for baseball. From 1982 onwards, the stadium began to be increasingly filled with fans; so much so that to see the exploits of the unforgettable Tom Mutz, Alessandro Cappuccini, Marco Mazzieri, and Alfio Boscarol, it was often necessary to find a seat in the stands hours before the game.

This mass phenomenon became even more noticeable the following year when Dario Borghino and Gianmario Costa arrived from Turin (with Mutz being replaced by Pat Callahan). For the first time, Grosseto found itself in first place after the game of 22 August at the Stadio Europeo in Parma, when a defensive triple play allowed the Biancorossi to defeat a Parma team that had dominated Italy and Europe for years.

However, despite the enthusiasm, the time was not yet ripe for winning the championship. Even in 1984, with the signings of Craig Stimac, Bob Pate, and a young Franco Casolari who left little mark, the dream did not materialize.

== See also ==
- Grosseto Baseball Club players

== Sources ==
- Baseball Reference – Italian Baseball League
- Grosseto Baseball
