= Nick Pugliese =

American baseball player

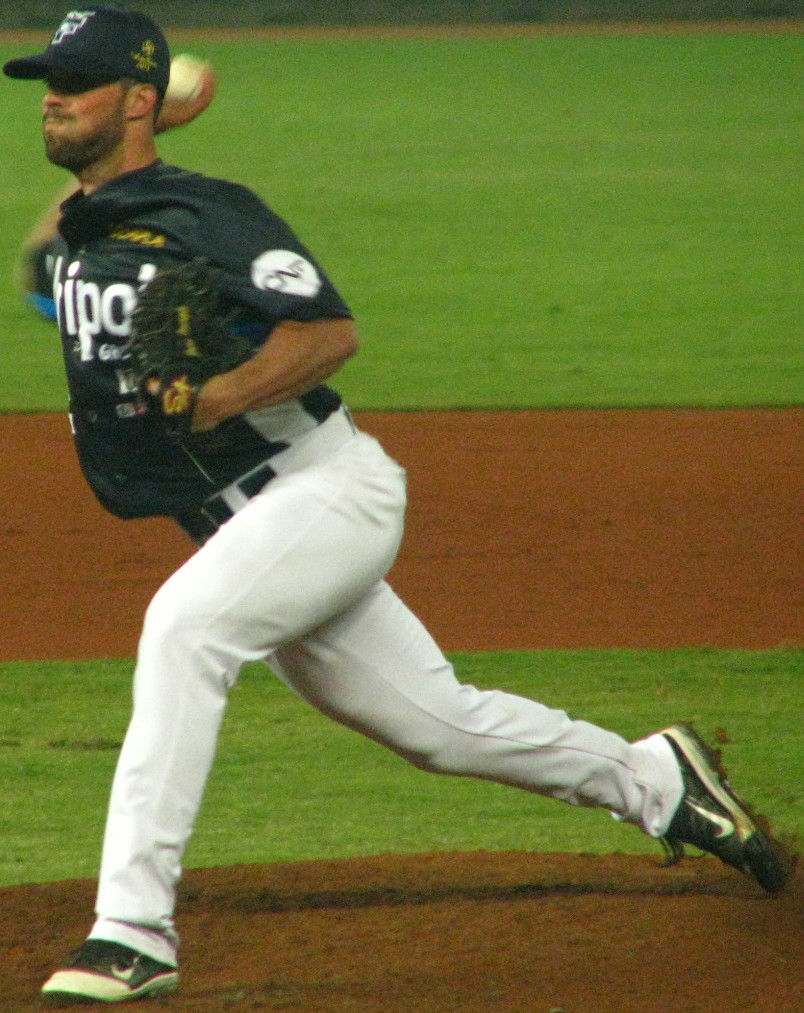

Free agent
- Pitcher
- Born: September 18, 1985 (age 40); Plainville, Connecticut, U.S.
- Bats: Right Throws: Right
- Stats at Baseball Reference
Medals
Men's baseball
Representing Italy
European Baseball Championship
Bronze medal – third place	2016 Hoofddorp	National team

Nicholas John Pugliese (born September 18, 1985) is an American professional baseball pitcher who is a free agent. He has played for the Italy national baseball team in the 2011 Baseball World Cup, the 2013 World Baseball Classic, and the 2019 European Baseball Championship.

== Career ==
=== Los Angeles Angels ===
Pugliese attended Stetson University and signed as an undrafted free agent with the Los Angeles Angels of Anaheim in 2008. He spent his first professional season split between the rookie–level Arizona League Angels and High–A Rancho Cucamonga Quakes, accumulating a 1.37 ERA with 23 strikeouts across 19 relief outings.

Pugliese split the 2009 season between Rancho Cucamonga and the Single–A Cedar Rapids Kernels. In 30 appearances out of the bullpen, he logged a combined 3.32 ERA with 53 strikeouts across 43 1/3 innings pitched. In 2010, Pugliese played for Rancho Cucamonga and the Double–A Arkansas Travelers. In 39 total games, he registered a 4–4 record and 5.03 ERA with 59 strikeouts across 62 2/3 innings of work.

Pugliese began the 2011 season with the High–A Inland Empire 66ers, but struggled to a 7.27 ERA across 6 appearances. He was released by the Angels organization on April 28, 2011.

=== Fortitudo Bologna ===
Following his release from the Angels, Pugliese signed with Fortitudo Bologna of the Italian Baseball League. He played for the club from 2011 to 2021, making 66 total appearances and recording a 1.89 ERA with 101 strikeouts and 6 saves across 76 innings pitched.
