= Fiorentina Baseball =

Fiorentina Baseball Softball

Information
- League: Serie A2 (Girone D)
- Location: Florence
- Ballpark: Cesare Vita Stadium
- Founded: 1947
- League championships: 1949
- Former name: Firenze Baseball Club; Lions Baseball Club
- Colours: Red, black, white
- Website: www.fiorentinabaseball.it

Fiorentina is a baseball club based in Florence, Italy, that competes in Serie A2, the second division of Italian baseball.

Firenze Baseball Club was founded on 24 September 1947, with their first Scudetto coming just two years later. In 1981 Firenze merged with Lions B.C., founded in 1955, and Fiorentina Baseball Softball was born.

Two former MLB players have been involved with the club: Kirk McCaskill and Alan Olmsted.
