= Stijn van der Meer =

Dutch baseball player (born 1993)

Neptunus – No. 18
- Shortstop
- Born: May 1, 1993 (age 33); Rosmalen, Netherlands
- Bats: Left Throws: Right
- Stats at Baseball Reference
Medals
Men's baseball
Representing Netherlands
European Baseball Championship
Gold medal – first place	2016 Hoofddorp	National team
Gold medal – first place	2025 Rotterdam	Team

Stijn van der Meer (born May 1, 1993) is a Dutch professional baseball shortstop for Neptunus of the Honkbal Hoofdklasse. He played for the Netherlands national team.

== Career ==
=== College ===
van der Meer played college baseball for Eastern Oklahoma State College and the Lamar University Cardinals. He had a Lamar-record 24-game hitting streak in 2016.

=== Houston Astros ===
The Astros selected van der Meer in the 34th round of the 2016 Major League Baseball draft. He signed and spent the season with both the Gulf Coast League Astros and Greeneville Astros, slashing .329/.404/.418 in 29 games. He began 2017 with the Buies Creek Astros but was released after six games on April 17.

=== Honkbal Hoofdklasse ===
van der Meer debuted in the Honkbal Hoofdklasse, the top Dutch baseball league, in 2012 with UVV Utrecht. He moved to Neptunus in 2014, playing with the team through 2025. He was the MVP of the 2018 Holland Series and drove in 3 runs in the final game of the 2024 Holland Series. He won the 2015, 2017, and 2018 European Champions Cup with Neptunus.

== International career ==
van der Meer played for the Netherlands national team in the 2017 World Baseball Classic. He was the MVP of the 2016 European Baseball Championship. He also played in the 2013 World Port Tournament. He was removed from the team in 2021 before coming back to the squad for the 2024 Haarlem Baseball Week, later playing in the 2024 WBSC Premier12. He walked in his one plate appearance in the 2025 European championship, which the Dutch won.

van der Meer formally retired from the Netherlands team in 2026.

== Personal life ==
van der Meer's younger brother Bob also plays in the Honkbal Hoofdklasse. The brother were teammates in 2025 and faced each other in the 2024 Holland Series, when Bob played for HCAW. van der Meer has a daughter. His grandfather was a founder of a baseball club in Rosmalen, which his parents also played for.

van der Meer has worked in video production for the Dutch Gymnastics Union (Dutch: Koninklijke Nederlandse Gymnastiek Unie).
