= Stadio di Baseball di Serravalle =

Baseball stadium in Serravalle, San Marino

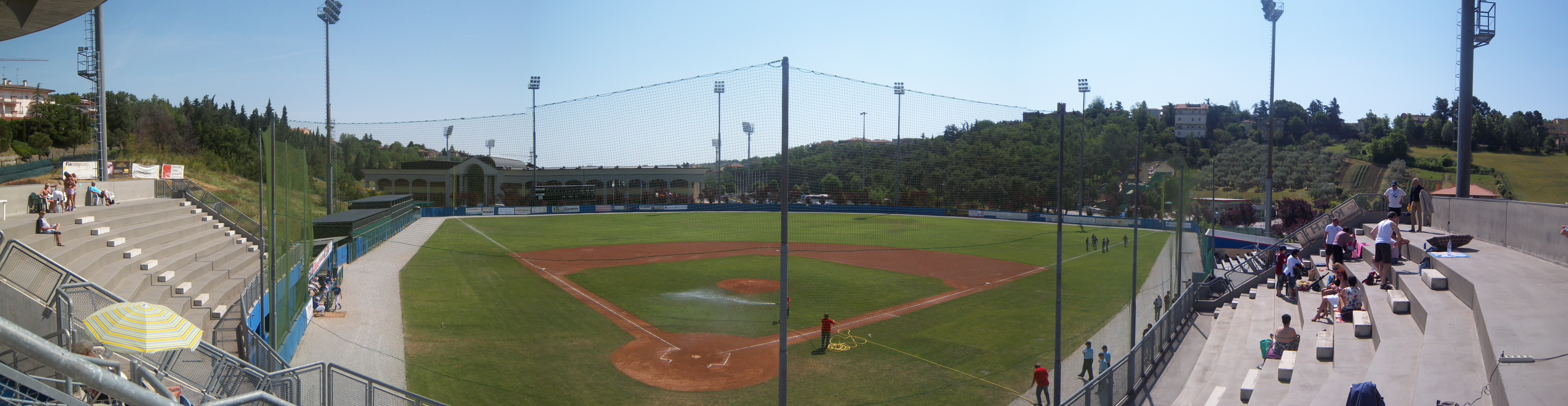
- Stadio Baseball Serravalle European Cup 2012
- Interactive map of Stadio di Baseball di Serravalle
- Location: Costa del Bello, 2; 47899, San Marino
- Coordinates: 43.9700°N 12.4739°E
- Owner: Federazione Sammarinese Baseball-Softball
- Capacity: 1,500
- Surface: Grass

Construction
- Opened: 1986

Tenants
- San Marino Baseball Club (1986–present); San Marino national baseball team (1986–present)

The Stadio di Baseball di Serravalle is a baseball stadium in Serravalle, San Marino. The stadium has a capacity of 1,500.

== See also ==
- Stadio Olimpico
