= Kai Gronauer =

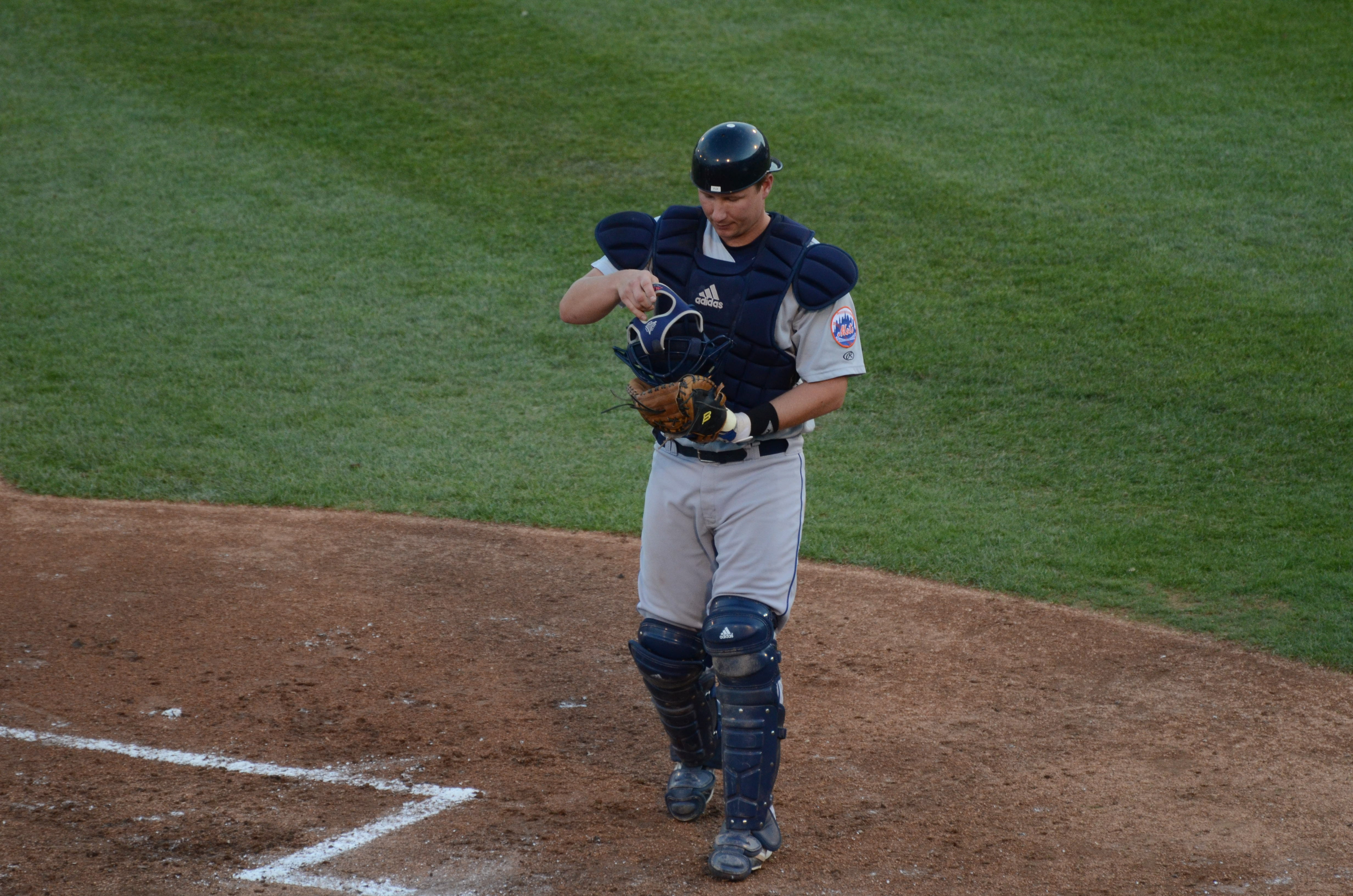
- Catcher
- Born: November 28, 1986 (age 39); Solingen, West Germany
- Bats: Right Throws: Right
- Stats at Baseball Reference

Kai Achim Gronauer (born November 28, 1986) is a professional baseball player who is a free agent. He also catches for the German national baseball team.

== Career ==
Gronauer started his career with the Solingen Alligators. In 2006, he and his teammates won the German championship and he became the youngest player of the German national baseball team. In the year 2008 the Minnesota Twins and the Pittsburgh Pirates were interested in him but he declined the offer in order to finish his vocational education in Germany.

As the New York Mets sent some scouts to Germany, he changed his opinion and signed a two-year contract. In his rookie-season he played for the Gulf Coast League Mets for 16 games. He quickly got advanced to Single-A in the season 2009 and played for the Savannah Sand Gnats in the South Atlantic League.

The Mets invited him to Spring Training in 2010 and 2011. Since the beginning of the 2011 season, he plays as second catcher for the Double-A team Binghamton Mets.

In a game against the Portland Sea Dogs in August 2011, Gronauer hit a three-run home run at Fenway Park (home of the Boston Red Sox) over the Green Monster in the 11th inning.
