= Baseball in Italy =

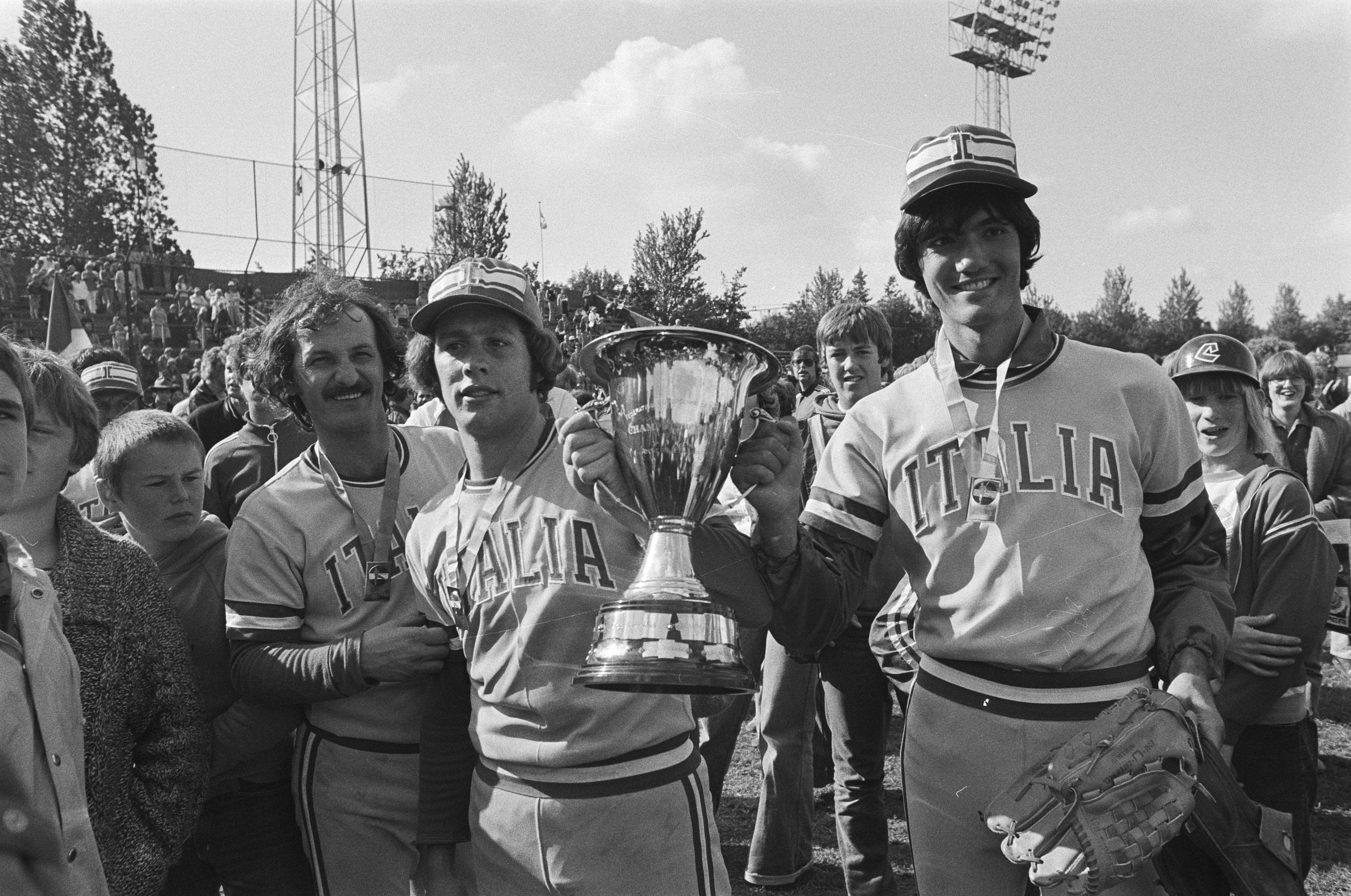
- Italy's national team has won nine European Championships, including 1977 (pictured)
- Country: Italy
- Governing body: Federazione Italiana Baseball Softball (FIBS)
- National team: Men's

National competitions
- Italian Baseball League

International competitions
- World Baseball Classic

Baseball is a growing, minor sport in Italy. The sport is governed by the Italian Baseball Softball Federation (Italian: Federazione Italiana Baseball Softball, or FIBS). Founded in 1948, the Italian Baseball League (officially the Serie A) is the highest level of professional baseball in Italy.

== History ==
The Spalding World Tour of 1889 brought baseball to Italy for the first time, playing three matches in the country. On February 19 in Naples, the All-Americans, a selection of all-star players from the National League won 8–2 against the Chicago White Stockings; on the 23rd at Rome in Piazza di Siena in Villa Borghese, Chicago won 3–2; and on the 25th, in Florence, the All-Americans won 7–4. A second American tour passed through Italy in February 1913, conducted by the Chicago White Sox. After failing to find a suitable field in Naples and experiencing unconducive weather in Rome, the team left Italy without playing a single game.

The real establishment of baseball in Italy began in 1919 under the leadership of Max Otto. A native of Turin under the name Mario Ottino, he spent several years in United States where he became a baseball fan. He returned to Italy after the First World War with equipment and the desire to develop the sport there. The other father of Italian baseball is the Rome native Guido Graziani, who had been organizing matches in Rome since 1920. Despite Otto and Graziani's best efforts, baseball failed to gain interest in Italy. When Benito Mussolini's fascist government established sabato fascista ("fascist Saturday"), a mandatory day of sporting and military exercise, baseball was excluded due to its American origins.

The arrival of American soldiers in Italy in 1944 changed the situation. Max Otto took the opportunity to relaunch his idea of an Italian league. The first official match played under the authority of Lega Italiana Baseball and was held on June 27, 1948, in Milan.

With the support of the press and powerful partners, particularly Coca-Cola, the debut of this league was a popular success. In Rome, Guido Graziani set up the Associazione Italia Baseball. The two leagues merged in 1950 to create the Federazione Italiana Palla Base, today known as the FIBS (Federazione Italiana Baseball Softball).

Alessandro Maestri has criticized the development of baseball in Italy in recent years, saying that the shrinking of the Italian Baseball League in 2010, in an effort to professionalize it, would decrease the motivation for young Italian players to develop in the domestic league.

Alex Liddi became the first Italian born and raised player to debut in Major League Baseball on September 7, 2011. Samuel Aldegheri debuted as the first Italian born and developed pitcher in Major League Baseball on August 30, 2024.

== National team ==
The Italian national baseball team is considered amongst the strongest in the European Baseball Championship.

The Italian baseball team takes part in international competitions, such as European Championships, Olympic Games, World Baseball Classic or the Baseball World Cup in particular. The national team finished fourth in the World Cup in 1974 and 1998, the national team has eight European championship titles between 1954 and 1997.

== Bibliography ==
- Peter C. Bjarkman, Diamonds Around The Globe: The Encyclopedia Of International Baseball, Greenwood Press, 2004
- Josh Chetwynd, Baseball in Europe: A Country by Country History, McFarland & Co Inc, 2008
- Dave Bidini, Baseballissimo: My Summer in the Italian Minor Leagues, McClelland & Stewart, 2004
