= Orel Anzio =

The Orel Anzio was a baseball club that played in the Italian Baseball League in its 2006 season.

The team was based in Anzio, a city located on the coast of the Lazio region of Italy, about 33 miles south of Rome which is noted as an important historical port.

Orel Anzio finished in last place with a 14-34 record in the nine-team league, and did not return for the next season.
