= Novara United =

Italian baseball franchise

The Novara Baseball is a professional baseball franchise based in the city of Novara in Italy.

Founded in October 1967, the Novara club joined the Class-A Italian Baseball League from 2011 through 2013. After two years of absence, in 2016 Novara returned to play in the highest category of Italian baseball.
