= Serie A2 (baseball) =

Minor baseball league in Italy

The Serie A2 was a minor baseball league in Italy from 1991 until 2021. Originally the second-highest division of the Italian baseball pyramid, it was part of a promotion and relegation system with the top-level Serie A1 (also known as the Italian Baseball League).

In 2010, the Italian baseball system was temporarily reorganized into a fixed closed-franchise system, similar to MLB teams and MiLB teams; this was reversed in 2018 when promotion and relegation was reintroduced.

Starting in 2021 season, Serie A1 and A2 were unified into a single top-level Serie A. Now, Serie B is the top-level minor league in Italy.
