= San Marino Baseball Club =

- Logo

Information
- League: Serie A1
- Location: San Marino, San Marino
- Ballpark: Stadio di Baseball di Serravalle
- Founded: 1985
- European Cup championships: 3 (2006, 2011, 2014)
- League championships: 6 (2008, 2011, 2012, 2013, 2021, 2025)
- Manager: Doriano Bindi

Current uniforms
Home

San Marino Baseball Club is a professional domestic baseball club based in San Marino. As of August 2021, they compete in Serie A1, the top tier of Italian baseball. Their current commercial name is T & A San Marino, because the team is primarily sponsored by the Italian company, Tecnologie e Ambiente S.A. They are currently being managed by Doriano Bindi.

== History ==
Baseball first got an audience in the 1960s, when some Sammarinese boys returning from the United States introduced it to their peers. The first San Marino Baseball Club was founded in 1970, when they entered the Italian league Serie D, and was promoted to the next tier Serie C four years later in 1974 and finally arriving in Serie C in 1980. In 1985, the club was transformed into a newer one, and the team entered Serie A1 Italian championships, the top series of Italian baseball where the team has played ever since. In 1992, the team made their first international debut, where they qualified to compete in the European Baseball Cup. Since then, the team has competed in the international tournament and remained securely in Serie A1. San Marino now organizes teams to enter Italian youth tournaments, where many additional titles have been won.

== Ballpark ==
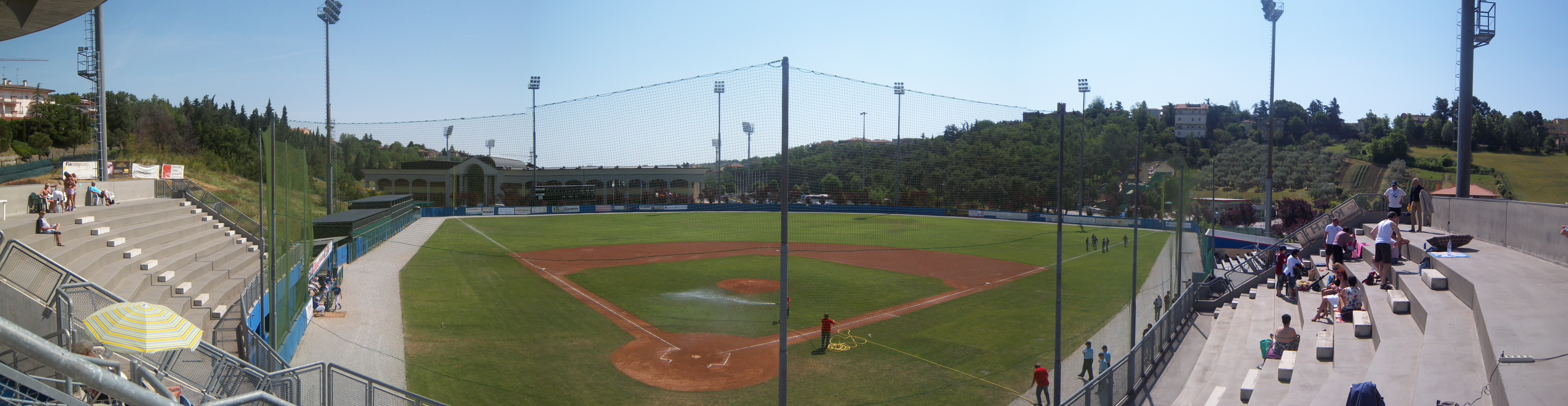
The stadium being used in 2012

T & A San Marino plays home games at the Stadio di Baseball di Serravalle baseball stadium. It is located in Serravalle and has a capacity of 1,500. The venue was used in the 2016 European Cup to co-host the games along with Italy. The stadium was constructed in 1986, and renovated for the European Cup. When the stadium reaches capacity, there is a hill on the side of the venue which can host spectators on the grass if required.

The stadium has been the home of T & A San Marino for almost all of their history since 1985 when they were transformed into the current club.

== Competitions ==
T & A San Marino often appears in the European Baseball Cup, with five final appearances and three victories in total.

The team also competes in the Serie A1, where they have won the title seven times in total in 2008, 2011, 2012, 2013, 2021, 2022 and most recently 2025. From 2019 to 2025 San Marino for 7 consecutive years has played the final winning 3 times.
