= Italian Baseball League =

Top-level baseball league in Italy

- Sport: Baseball
- First season: 1948
- President: Riccardo Fraccari
- No. of teams: 33
- Country: Italy; San Marino
- Most recent champion: San Marino (2025)
- Most titles: Nettuno BC 1945 (17 titles)
- Relegation to: Serie B
- Website: www.fibs.it

The Italian Baseball League (IBL, Italian: Campionato italiano di baseball), officially known as the Serie A (Italian pronunciation: [ˈsɛːrje ˈa]), is the top-level baseball league in Italy. Founded in 1948, it is governed by the Italian Baseball & Softball Federation (FIBS), which has its headquarters in Rome.

Many of the teams are based in the northern Emilia-Romagna region of Italy, which has historically been the hotbed of baseball in the country; a team from the Republic of San Marino also plays in Serie A.

Like most sports leagues in Europe, and unlike professional baseball leagues in North America and Asia, the IBL uses a promotion and relegation system; the bottom five clubs are relegated to the Serie B minor league. Winners of the league are awarded a scudetto, and earn the right to represent Italy in the European Champions Cup. (Note: That is, for Italian clubs; San Marino BC automatically qualifies to play in the European Cup as the sole representative of the Republic of San Marino.)

== History ==
Until 2010, the IBL featured a promotion-and-relegation league format that demoted the last place finisher to the minor leagues (Series A2), while the Serie A2 (baseball) champion would be promoted into the IBL. This was changed in late 2009, when FIBS approved the decision to introduce a fixed-team franchise format (similar to that found in Major League Baseball) starting with the 2010 season.

However, in 2018, the promotion-and-relegation system was reintroduced.

In 2021, the Italian Baseball League was rebranded as Serie A, bringing together the previous eight-team Serie A1 and the second-tier Serie A2. The new league was structured into 33 participating teams in 8 divisions, or gironi (lit. "groups"). The 8 gironi winners compete for the league championship (the scudetto), while the remaining 25 will fight to avoid being among the five relegated to Serie B. In 2023, the league size was reduced to 30 teams, divided into five gironi; the top two in each group of the first phase (prima fase) advance to the poule scudetto (and then to the playoffs), while those not qualified fight to avoid relegation.

== Teams ==
As is the practice in Asian baseball leagues like Japan's NPB and South Korea's KBO, many of the official team names in the Serie A include the team's corporate sponsor — though unlike Asian baseball, a sponsorship name does not necessarily indicate ownership.

=== 2023 poule scudetto teams ===
Of the 33 teams participating in the 2023 Serie A season, ten qualified for the poule scudetto (the championship pool). The top eight teams in the poule scudetto qualify for the postseason.

| 2023 Team | Location | 2023 prima face position (Group) | First season in Serie A | No. of seasons of current spell in Serie A | Scudetto titles | Most recent Scudetto |
Girone F
| Hotsand Macerata Angels | (Italy) Macerata | 1st (A) | 2020 | 4 | — | — |
| Godo Baseball | (Italy) Russi | 2nd (C) | 2006 | 5 | — | — |
| Nettuno BC 1945 | (Italy) Nettuno | 1st (D) | 1950 | 3 | 17 | 2001 |
| Comcor Modena | (Italy) Modena | 1st (E) | 1966 | 3 | — | — |
| New Black Panthers | (Italy) Ronchi dei Legionari | 2nd (B) | 1969 | 3 | — | — |
Girone G
| Fortitudo Bologna | (Italy) Bologna | 1st (C) | 1963 | 26 | 14 | 2023 |
| Senago BC | (Italy) Milan | 2nd (E) | 2021 | 3 | — | — |
| BSC Grosseto | (Italy) Grosseto | 2nd (D) | 1999 | 9 | 5 | 2014 |
| Parma Clima | (Italy) Parma | 1st (B) | 1950 | 59 | 10 | 2010 |
| San Marino Baseball | San Marino | 2nd (A) | 1985 | 38 | 6 | 2022 |

Italian Baseball League poule scudetto team locations

=== Defunct teams ===
- Orel Anzio

== Champions ==
Key
| † | Team also won the European Champions Cup that season |
| † | Team also won the Baseball Champions League Europe that season |

=== Single-table era (1948–85) ===
| Season | Champion | Record | Runners up | MVP |
|---|---|---|---|---|
| 1948 | Libertas Bologna | 4–0 | Ambrosiana Milano | - |
| 1949 | Firenze (LIB) | 8–2 | Ambrosiana Milano (LIB) | - |
| 1949 | Lazio (Serie A) | 5–0 | Ferrovieri Roma (Serie A) | - |
| 1950 | Libertas Roma | 18–2 | USCM Nettuno | - |
| 1951 | Nettuno BC | 17–1 | Libertas Roma | - |
| 1952 | Nettuno BC (2) | 16–2 | Libertas Roma | - |
| 1953 | Nettuno BC (3) | 16–2 | Lazio | - |
| 1954 | Nettuno BC (4) | 13–1 | AS Roma | - |
| 1955 | Lazio (2) | 12–2 | Nettuno | - |
| 1956 | Chlorodont Nettuno (5) | 10–2 | AS Roma | - |
| 1957 | Chlorodont Nettuno (6) | 13–1 | Lazio | - |
| 1958 | Algida Nettuno B.C. (7) | 12–0 | AS Roma | - |
| 1958 | C.U.S. Milano | 12–2 | Libertas Inter Milano | - |
| 1959 | Coca-Cola Roma (2) | 10–0 | Algida Nettuno | - |
| 1960 | Seven Up Milano (2) | 13–5 | Roma S.C. | - |
| 1961 | Europhon Milano (3) | 18–0 | Pirelli Milano | - |
| 1962 | Europhon Milano (4) | 18–0 | Simmenthal Nettuno/ ACLI Bologna | - |
| 1963 | Simmenthal Nettuno (8) | 15–3 | Libertas Milano/ Europhon Milano | - |
| 1964 | Simmenthal Nettuno (9) | 15–3 | UGF Fortitudo Bologna | - |
| 1965 | Simmenthal Nettuno (10) | 28–4 | Europhon Milano | - |
| 1966 | Europhon Milano (5) | 33–3 | Tanara Parma | - |
| 1967 | Europhon Milano (6) | 29–3 | Nettuno | - |
| 1968 | Europhon Milano (7) | 20–6 | Nettuno | - |
| 1969 | Montenegro Bologna | 21–6 | Noalex Milano | - |
| 1970 | Europhon Milano (8) | 39–5 | Montenegro Bologna | - |
| 1971 | Glen Grant Nettuno (11) | 38–6 | Bernazzoli Parma | - |
| 1972 | Montenegro Bologna (2) | 36–8 | Bernazzoli Parma | - |
| 1973 | Glen Grant Nettuno (12) | 36–8 | Montenegro Bologna | - |
| 1974 | Montenegro Bologna (3) | 36–8 | Colombo Nettuno | - |
| 1975 | Cercosti Rimini | 46–13 | Bernazzoli Parma | - |
| 1976 | Germal Parma | 51–3 | Colombo Nettuno | - |
| 1977 | Germal Parma (2) | 20–4 (first half); 22–8 (second half) | Derbigum Rimini | Mike Romano |
| 1978 | Biemme Bologna (4) | 31–5 | Cercosti Rimini | Carlos Guzman |
| 1979 | Derbigum Rimini (2) | 30–6 | Germal Parma / Colombo Nettuno | John Long |
| 1980 | Derbigum Rimini (3) | 30–6 | Glen Grant Nettuno | Ed Oliveros |
| 1981 | Parmalat Parma (3) | 24–4 (first half); 34–6 (second half) | Papà Barzetti Rimini | John Guggiana |
| 1982 | Parmalat Parma (4) | 23–5 (first half); 34–6 (second half) | Sicma Nettuno | Giuseppe Carelli |
| 1983 | Papà Barzetti Rimini (4) | 15–3 (first half); 32–10 (second half) | Nordmende Bologna | - |
| 1984 | BE. CA. Bologna (5) | 14–7 (first half); 29–11 (second half) | World Vision Parma | - |
| 1985 | World Vision Parma (5) | 51–15 | BE. CA. Bologna | - |

=== Playoff era (1986–present) ===
| Year | Winning team | Runner up | Result | MVP |
|---|---|---|---|---|
| 1986 | Grohe Grosseto | Trevi Rimini | 4–3 | - |
| 1987 | Trevi Rimini (5) | Mamoli Grosseto | 4–1 | - |
| 1988 | Ronson Lenoir Rimini (6) | SCAC Nettuno | 4–0 | - |
| 1989 | Mamoli Grosseto (2) | Ronson Lenoir Rimini | 4–2 | - |
| 1990 | SCAC Nettuno (13) | Ronson Lenoir Rimini | 4–3 | - |
| 1991 | Parma Angels (6) | Flower Gloves Verona | 3-0 | — |
| 1992 | Telemarket Rimini (7) | Eurobuilding Bologna | 3-0 | (United States) David Sheldon |
| 1993 | C.F.C. Nettuno (14) | Telemarket Rimini | 3–2 | (United States) Jessie Reid |
| 1994 | Cariparma Angels (7) | Danesi Nettuno | 4–1 | (United States) Brad Komminsk |
| 1995 | Cariparma Angels (8) | Danesi Nettuno | 4–1 | (Italy) Roberto Bianchi |
| 1996 | Caffè Danesi Nettuno (15) | Cariparma Angels | 4–2 | (Italy) Francesco Casolari |
| 1997 | Cariparma Parma (9) | Danesi Nettuno | 4–3 | (Italy) Francesco Casolari |
| 1998 | Danesi Nettuno (16) | Semenzato Rimini | 4–1 | (Italy) Federico Bassi |
| 1999 | Semenzato Rimini (8) | Danesi Nettuno | 4–3 | (United States) Ed Campaniello (Rimini) |
| 2000 | Semenzato Rimini (9) | Danesi Nettuno | 4–0 | (Italy) Claudio Liverziani (Rimini) |
| 2001 | Caffè Danesi Nettuno (17) | Semenzato Rimini | 4–2 | (Italy) Juan Carlos Vigna |
| 2002 | Semenzato Rimini (10) | Danesi Nettuno | 4–1 | (Venezuela) Orlando Muñoz (Modena) |
| 2003 | Italeri Bologna (6) | GB Ricambi Modena | 4–1 | (Italy) Claudio Liverziani (Bologna) |
| 2004 | Prink Grosseto (3) | Italeri Bologna | 4–2 | (Puerto Rico) Jaime Navarro (Grosseto) |
| 2005 | Italeri Bologna (7) | T & A San Marino | 4–3 | (Dominican Republic) Jesús Matos (Bologna) |
| 2006 | Telemarket Rimini (11) | Colonie Maremma Grosseto | 4–1 | (Italy) Mario Chiarini (Rimini) |
| 2007 | Montepaschi Grosseto (4) | Danesi Nettuno | 4–3 | (Italy) Giuseppe Mazzanti (Nettuno) |
| 2008 | T & A San Marino | Danesi Nettuno | 4–3 | (Italy) Giuseppe Mazzanti (Nettuno) |
| 2009 | UGF Banca Bologna (8) | T & A San Marino | 4–1 | (Dominican Republic) Eddie Garabito (Bologna) |
| 2010 | Cariparma Parma (10) | Fortitudo Bologna | 4–2 | (Venezuela) Orlando Muñoz (Parma) |
| 2011 | T & A San Marino (2) | Danesi Nettuno | 4–3 | (Venezuela) Willie Vasquez (San Marino) |
| 2012 | T & A San Marino (3) | Rimini Baseball | 4–2 | (Dominican Republic) Danilo Sanchez (Godo) |
| 2013 | T & A San Marino (4) | Rimini Baseball | 3–2 | (Italy) Alessandro Vaglio |
| 2014 | UGF Banca Bologna (9) | Rimini Baseball | 4–3 | (Italy) Claudio Liverziani |
| 2015 | Rimini Baseball (12) | Fortitudo Baseball Bologna | 4–0 | (Italy) Giuseppe Mazzanti |
| 2016 | UGF Banca Bologna (10) | Rimini Baseball | 4–2 | (Italy) Sebastiano Poma |
| 2017 | ASD Rimini (13) | T & A San Marino | 3–0 | |
| 2018 | UnipolSai Bologna (11) | Parmaclima | 3–1 | |
| 2019 | UnipolSai Bologna (12) | T & A San Marino | 3–0 | |
| 2020 | UnipolSai Bologna (13) | T & A San Marino | 4–3 | |
| 2021 | T & A San Marino (5) | UnipolSai Bologna | 3–2 | |
| 2022 | T & A San Marino (6) | Parmaclima | 4–3 | |
| 2023 | UnipolSai Bologna (14) | T & A San Marino | 4–0 | (Italy) Ricardo Paolini |
| 2024 | ParmaClima (11) | San Marino Baseball Club | 4–1 | (Italy) Alex Liddi |
| 2025 | San Marino Baseball Club (7) | ParmaClima | 4–0 | (Italy) Ortwin Pieternella |
| 2026 | 1949 Parma Baseball Club (12) | San Marino Baseball Club | 4–1 | |

=== Championships per team ===
| Team | Total | Years |
|---|---|---|
| Nettuno BC 1945 | 17 | 1951, 1952, 1953, 1954, 1956, 1957, 1958, 1963, 1964, 1965, 1971, 1973, 1990, 1993, 1996, 1998, 2001 |
| Fortitudo Bologna | 14 | 1969, 1972, 1974, 1978, 1984, 2003, 2005, 2009, 2014, 2016, 2018, 2019, 2020, 2023 |
| Rimini BC | 13 | 1975, 1979, 1980, 1983, 1987, 1988, 1992, 1999, 2000, 2002, 2006, 2015, 2017 |
| Parma BC | 11 | 1976, 1977, 1981, 1982, 1985, 1991, 1994, 1995, 1997, 2010, 2024 |
| Milano BC 1946 | 8 | 1958, 1960, 1961, 1962, 1966, 1967, 1968, 1970 |
| San Marino BC | 7 | 2008, 2011, 2012, 2013, 2021, 2022, 2025 |
| BBC Grosseto | 4 | 1986, 1989, 2004, 2007 |
| Roma | 2 | 1950, 1959 |
| Lazio | 2 | 1949 (LIB), 1955 |
| Fiorentina | 1 | 1949 (Serie A) |

== Notable former players ==
- Samuel Aldegheri: Italian pitcher who played for Parma Clima before making his Major League Baseball (MLB) debut with the Los Angeles Angels
- Jason Simontacchi: Pitcher for Novara Baseball and retired MLB pitcher
- Chuck Carr: Centerfielder for Rimini and retired MLB outfielder
- Junior Guerra: Pitcher for T & A San Marino before joining the Milwaukee Brewers
- Robel García: Infielder for Fortitudo Bologna before joining the Chicago Cubs
- Alex Liddi: Italian infielder who played for the Seattle Mariners before joining ParmaClima.
- Abraham Núñez: Outfielder for The Nettuno Baseball Club and retired MLB outfielder
- Jason Conti: Outfielder for Fortitudo Bologna after playing five MLB seasons.

== Standings ==
| Rank | Team | Record (W-T-L) | Team Link | Still Active? | When Started | Stadium Name |
|---|---|---|---|---|---|---|
| 1 | Libertas Bologna | Ambrosiana Milano | - | | | |
| 2 | Mamoli Grosseto (LIB); Lazio (FIBS) | Ambrosiana Milano (LIB); Ferrovieri Roma (FIBS) | - | | | |
| 1950 | Libertas Roma | USCM Nettuno | - | | | |
| 1951 | Nettuno B.C. | Libertas Roma | - | | | |
| 1952 | Nettuno B.C. | Libertas Roma | - | | | |
| 1953 | Nettuno B.C. | Lazio | - | | | |
| 1954 | Nettuno B.C. | A.S. Roma | - | | | |
| 1955 | Lazio | Nettuno | - | | | |
| 1956 | Chlorodont Nettuno | A.S. Roma | - | | | |
| 1957 | Chlorodont Nettuno | Lazio | - | | | |
| 1958 | Algida Nettuno B.C. | A.S. Roma | - | | | |
| 1958 | C.U.S. Milano | Libertas Inter Milano | - | | | |
| 1959 | Coca-Cola Roma | Algida Nettuno | - | | | |
| 1960 | Seven Up Milano | Roma S.C. | - | | | |
| 1961 | Europhon Milano | Pirelli Milano | - | | | |
| 1962 | Europhon Milano | Simmenthal Nettuno/ ACLI Bologna | - | | | |
| 1963 | Simmenthal Nettuno | Libertas Milano/ Europhon Milano | - | | | |
| 1964 | Simmenthal Nettuno | UGF Fortitudo Bologna | - | | | |
| 1965 | Simmenthal Nettuno | Europhon Milano | - | | | |
| 1966 | Europhon Milano | Tanara Parma | - | | | |
| 1967 | Europhon Milano | Nettuno | - | | | |
| 1968 | Europhon Milano | Nettuno | - | | | |
| 1969 | Montenegro Bologna | Noalex Milano | - | | | |
| 1970 | Europhon Milano | Montenegro Bologna | - | | | |
| 1971 | Glen Grant Nettuno | Bernazzoli Parma | - | | | |
| 1972 | Montenegro Bologna | Bernazzoli Parma | - | | | |
| 1973 | Glen Grant Nettuno | Montenegro Bologna | - | | | |
| 1974 | Montenegro Bologna | Colombo Nettuno | - | | | |
| 1975 | Cercosti Rimini | Bernazzoli Parma | - | | | |
| 1976 | Germal Parma | Colombo Nettuno | - | | | |
| 1977 | Germal Parma | Derbigum Rimini | Mike Romano | | | |
| 1978 | Biemme Bologna | Cercosti Rimini | Carlos Guzman | | | |
| 1979 | Derbigum Rimini | Germal Parma / Colombo Nettuno | John Long | | | |
| 1980 | Derbigum Rimini | Glen Grant Nettuno | Ed Oliveros | | | |
| 1981 | Parmalat Parma | Papà Barzetti Rimini | John Guggiana | | | |
| 1982 | Parmalat Parma | Sicma Nettuno | Giuseppe Carelli | | | |
| 1983 | Papà Barzetti Rimini | Nordmende Bologna | - | | | |
| 1984 | BE. CA. Bologna | World Vision Parma | - | | | |
| 1985 | World Vision Parma | BE. CA. Bologna | - | | | |

== See also ==
- Baseball in Italy
- Italian Baseball League 2D
- Italy national baseball team
- Baseball awards in Italy
- Baseball awards in Europe
