= 2017 World Baseball Classic – Qualifier 4 =

Baseball tournament results

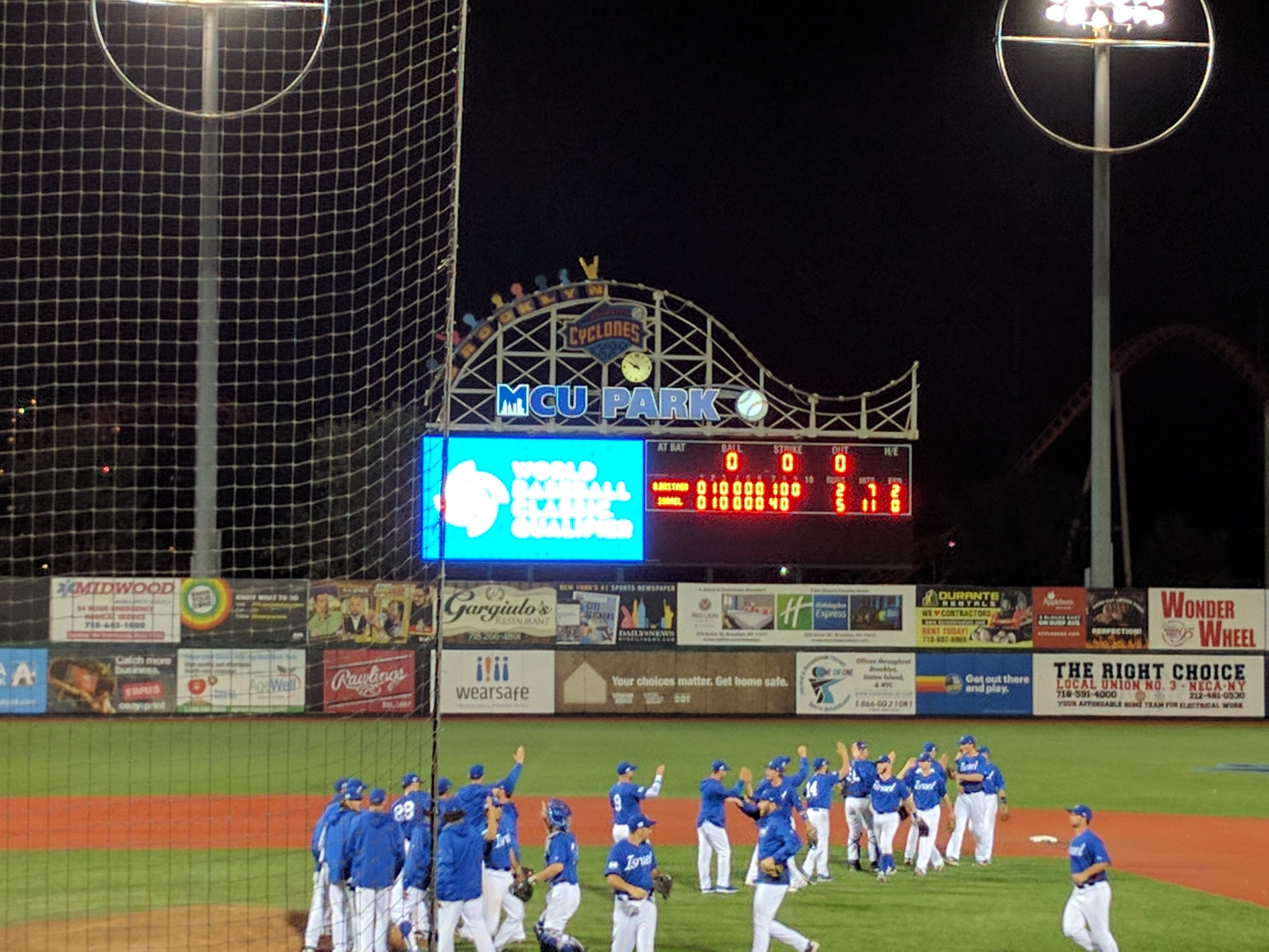
Team Israel celebrating on the field after defeating Great Britain on September 22, 2016.

Qualifier 4 of the Qualifying Round of the 2017 World Baseball Classic was held at MCU Park, Brooklyn, New York, United States from September 22 to 25, 2016. It was won by Team Israel, which went on to play in the World Baseball Classic in March 2017.

Qualifier 4 was a modified double-elimination tournament. The winners of the first games, Israel and Brazil, matched up in the second game, which Israel won. Meanwhile, the losers, Great Britain and Pakistan, faced each other in an elimination game, which Great Britain won.

The winners of the elimination game, Great Britain, then played and defeated the losers of the non-elimination game, Brazil, in another elimination game.

Israel then defeated Great Britain 9–1 in the final on September 25, 2016, to determine the winners of the Qualifier 4. Team Israel next played in South Korea in March 2017, as the 16th and final team in the WBC. They swept Pool B, beating South Korea, Taiwan, and the Netherlands, to qualify for the second round.

== Bracket ==
Preliminaries
–	Pakistan	0
–	Brazil	10
–	Great Britain	2
–	Israel	5
Lower round 1
L1	Pakistan	0
L2	Great Britain	14

Semifinals
W1	Brazil	0
W2	Israel	1
Lower final
W4	Great Britain	4
L3	Brazil	3

Qualifier
W3	Israel	9
W5	Great Britain	1

== Results ==
- All times are Eastern Daylight Time (UTC−04:00).

=== Brazil 10, Pakistan 0 ===
September 22 12:00 at MCU Park (F/7)
Team	1	2	3	4	5	6	7	8	9	R	H	E
Pakistan	0	0	0	0	0	0	0	X	X	0	4	1
Brazil	0	0	3	1	2	0	4	X	X	10	13	2
WP: Jean Tome (1−0) LP: Inayat Khan (0−1); Home runs: PAK: None; BRA: J. C. Muñiz (1); Attendance: 1,210 (17.3%); Umpires: HP − Alberto Ruiz, 1B − Andrew Higgins, 2B − Travis Eggert, 3B − Shane Livensparger; Notes: Completed early due to 10–run mercy rule after 7 innings. Two outs when last run scored. Boxscore

=== Israel 5, Great Britain 2 ===
September 22 19:00 at MCU Park
Team	1	2	3	4	5	6	7	8	9	R	H	E
Great Britain	0	1	0	0	0	0	1	0	0	2	7	2
Israel	0	1	0	0	0	0	4	0	X	5	11	0
WP: Craig Breslow (1−0) LP: Vaughan Harris (0−1) Sv: Brad Goldberg (1); Attendance: 3,919 (56.0%); Umpires: HP − Serge Makouchetev, 1B − Shane Livensparger, 2B − Andrew Higgins, 3B − Bing Xu; Boxscore

=== Israel 1, Brazil 0 ===
September 23 12:00 at MCU Park
Team	1	2	3	4	5	6	7	8	9	R	H	E
Brazil	0	0	0	0	0	0	0	0	0	0	3	1
Israel	0	0	0	1	0	0	0	0	X	1	3	0
WP: Corey Baker (1−0) LP: Bo Takahashi (0−1) Sv: Brad Goldberg (2); Attendance: 1,862 (26.6%); Umpires: HP − Andrew Higgins, 1B − Shane Livensparger, 2B − Alberto Ruiz, 3B − Bing Xu; Boxscore

=== Great Britain 14, Pakistan 0 ===
September 23 19:00 at MCU Park (F/7)
Team	1	2	3	4	5	6	7	8	9	R	H	E
Great Britain	0	1	2	1	6	3	1	X	X	14	13	1
Pakistan	0	0	0	0	0	0	0	X	X	0	2	3
WP: Paul Kirkpatrick (1−0) LP: Muhammad Zohaib (0−1); Attendance: 1,359 (19.4%); Umpires: HP − Travis Eggert, 1B − Serge Makouchetev, 2B − Bing Xu, 3B − Alberto Ruiz; Notes: Completed early due to 10–run mercy rule after 7 innings. Boxscore

=== Great Britain 4, Brazil 3 ===
September 24 20:00 at MCU Park
Team	1	2	3	4	5	6	7	8	9	R	H	E
Brazil	0	0	2	0	0	0	0	1	0	3	12	1
Great Britain	0	0	3	0	0	0	1	0	X	4	6	1
WP: Chris Reed (1−0) LP: André Rienzo (0−1) Sv: Daniel Cooper (1); Attendance: 1,480 (21.1%); Umpires: HP − Shane Livensparger, 1B − Travis Eggert, 2B − Serge Makouchetev, 3B − Bing Xu; Boxscore

=== Israel 9, Great Britain 1 ===
September 25 18:00 at MCU Park
Team	1	2	3	4	5	6	7	8	9	R	H	E
Great Britain	0	0	0	0	0	0	0	1	0	1	4	1
Israel	0	0	0	0	4	1	1	3	X	9	11	1
WP: Josh Zeid (1−0) LP: Spencer Kreisberg (0−1); Home runs: GBR: None; ISR: Blake Gailen (1), Ryan Lavarnway (1), Cody Decker (1); Attendance: 2,016 (28.8%); Umpires: HP − Alberto Ruiz, 1B − Travis Eggert, 2B − Andrew Higgins, 3B − Serge Makouchetev; Boxscore
