= List of Major League Baseball players from Brazil =

This is an alphabetical list of players from Brazil who have played in Major League Baseball. The first Brazilian debuted in 2012.

== Players ==
Name	Debut	Position	Teams	Ref
Yan Gomes	May 17, 2012	Catcher	Toronto Blue Jays (2012); Cleveland Indians (2013–2018); Washington Nationals (2019–2020); Oakland Athletics (2021); Chicago Cubs (2022–2024)	
André Rienzo	July 30, 2013	Pitcher	Chicago White Sox (2013–2014); Miami Marlins (2015)	
Paulo Orlando	April 9, 2015	Outfielder	Kansas City Royals (2015–2018)	
Thyago Vieira	August 14, 2017	Pitcher	Seattle Mariners (2017); Chicago White Sox (2018–2019); Milwaukee Brewers (2023–2024); Baltimore Orioles (2024); Arizona Diamondbacks (2024)	
Luiz Gohara	September 6, 2017	Pitcher	Atlanta Braves (2017–2018)	
Bo Bichette	2019	Shortstop	Toronto Blue Jays (2019–Present)	
