= Lucas Rojo =

Brazilian baseball player (born 1994)

- Infielder
- Born: April 5, 1994 (age 31); Ibiúna, Brazil
- Bats: Right Throws: Right
- Stats at Baseball Reference
Medals
Men's baseball
Representing Brazil
Pan American Games
Silver medal – second place	2023 Santiago	Team

Lucas Rojo (born April 5, 1994) is a Brazilian former professional baseball infielder.

== Professional career ==
=== Philadelphia Phillies ===
He spent three seasons in the Venezuelan Summer League playing for the Phillies. He batted .275 in 128 games.

== International career ==
He was selected for Brazil national baseball team at the 2013 World Baseball Classic Qualification, 2013 World Baseball Classic, 2017 World Baseball Classic Qualification, 2019 Pan American Games Qualifier, and 2021 World Baseball Classic Qualifier.

Rojo was part of the Brazilian squad that won the silver medal at the 2023 Pan American Games contested in Santiago, Chile in October 2023.
