= Alan Fanhoni =

Brazilian baseball player (born 1991)

- Infielder
- Born: December 23, 1991 (age 34); São Paulo, Brazil
- Bats: Left Throws: Right

Alan Belen Fanhoni (born December 23, 1991) is a Brazilian baseball infielder.

He was selected for Brazil national baseball team at the 2013 World Baseball Classic Qualification, 2013 World Baseball Classic, 2019 Pan American Games Qualifier, and 2021 World Baseball Classic Qualifier.
