= Gabriel Asakura =

Brazilian baseball player (born 1988)

- Pitcher
- Born: November 12, 1988 (age 37); São Paulo, Brazil
- Bats: Right Throws: Right

Gabriel Asakura (born November 12, 1988) is a Brazilian professional baseball pitcher. He attended West Los Angeles College and Cal State Los Angeles and played with the Palm Springs Power in the Southern California Collegiate Baseball Association and the Peninsula Oilers in the Alaska Baseball League. He represented Brazil at 2013 World Baseball Classic.
