= Eric Pardinho =

Brazilian baseball player (born 2001)

Ottawa Titans – No. 35
- Pitcher
- Born: January 5, 2001 (age 25); Lucélia, São Paulo, Brazil
- Bats: Right Throws: Right
Medals
Men's baseball
Representing Brazil
Pan American Games
Silver medal – second place	2023 Santiago	Team

Eric Eiji Tanuguchi Pardinho (born January 5, 2001) is a Brazilian professional baseball pitcher for the Ottawa Titans of the Frontier League.

== Professional career ==
=== Toronto Blue Jays ===
Pardinho was ranked by MLB as the fifth-best international prospect available during the 2017 international signing period. On July 2, 2017, Pardinho signed with the Toronto Blue Jays and received a $1.4 million signing bonus. He was assigned to extended spring training for the remainder of the year, as well as the first half of the 2018 season. On June 20, 2018, Pardinho made his professional debut with the rookie–level Bluefield Blue Jays. In 11 starts for Bluefield, he posted a 4-3 record and 2.88 ERA with 64 strikeouts in 50 innings. Pardinho split the 2019 campaign between the rookie-level Gulf Coast League Blue Jays and Single-A Lansing Lugnuts, accumulating a 2-1 record and 2.15 ERA with 35 strikeouts over 37 2/3 innings pitched across 8 games (7 starts).

On February 11, 2020, Pardinho underwent Tommy John surgery and was ruled out for the entirety of the 2020 season. The 2020 minor league season was ultimately cancelled as a result of the COVID-19 pandemic, and he made two rehabilitation appearances for the rookie–level Florida Complex League Blue Jays in 2021. Pardinho split the 2022 season between the High-A Vancouver Canadians, Single-A Dunedin Blue Jays, and FCL Blue Jays, accumulating a 3-0 record and 5.70 ERA with 42 strikeouts across 30 innings pitched. He returned to Vancouver for the 2023 season, registering a 2-2 record and 7.15 ERA with 61 strikeouts across 35 appearances.

Pardinho split the 2024 campaign between the Double–A New Hampshire Fisher Cats and Triple–A Buffalo Bisons. In 45 appearances out of the bullpen for the two affiliates, he compiled a 2–1 record and 3.25 ERA with 66 strikeouts across 55 1/3 innings pitched. Pardinho elected free agency following the season on November 4, 2024.

On December 20, 2024, Pardinho re–signed with the Blue Jays on a minor league contract. In 21 appearances split between the FCL Blue Jays, Dunedin, and Buffalo, he accumulated a 1-2 record and 4.01 ERA with 31 strikeouts across 24 2/3 innings pitched. Pardinho was released by the Blue Jays organization on August 1, 2025.

=== Ottawa Titans ===
On January 7, 2026, Pardinho signed with the Saraperos de Saltillo of the Mexican League. However, he failed to make the Opening Day roster and was released prior to the start of the season on April 14.

On June 2, 2026, Pardinho signed with the Ottawa Titans of the Frontier League.

== International career ==
As a 15-year-old, Pardinho played for Brazil in their attempt to qualify for the 2017 World Baseball Classic. He pitched 2/3 of an inning against Pakistan, and his fastball was clocked as high as 94 miles per hour (151 km/h) in 2016.

At the 2023 Pan American Games, Pardinho was on Brazil's silver-medal winning team. In three games, he pitched four innings and allowed zero earned runs.
