= Rafael Moreno =

Rafael Moreno may refer to:

- Pichichi (footballer) (Rafael Moreno Aranzadi, 1892–1922), Spanish footballer
- Rafael Moreno (baseball) (born 1995), Brazilian baseball pitcher
- Rafael Moreno Echavarría (1888–1960), Chilean academic and politician
- Rafael Moreno (judoka) (born 1966), Spanish judoka
- Rafael Moreno Rojas (1936–2021), Chilean politician
- Rafael Moreno (tennis) (born 1960), Dominican Republic tennis player
- Rafael Moreno Valle (1917–2016), Mexican military physician and politician
- Rafael Moreno Valle Rosas (1968–2018), Mexican politician
