= Magario =

Magario is a surname. Notable people with the surname include:

- Mike Magario (born 1991), Brazilian baseball player
- Verónica Magario (born 1969), Argentine politician
