= Reinaldo Sato =

Brazilian baseball coach and former player (born 1980)

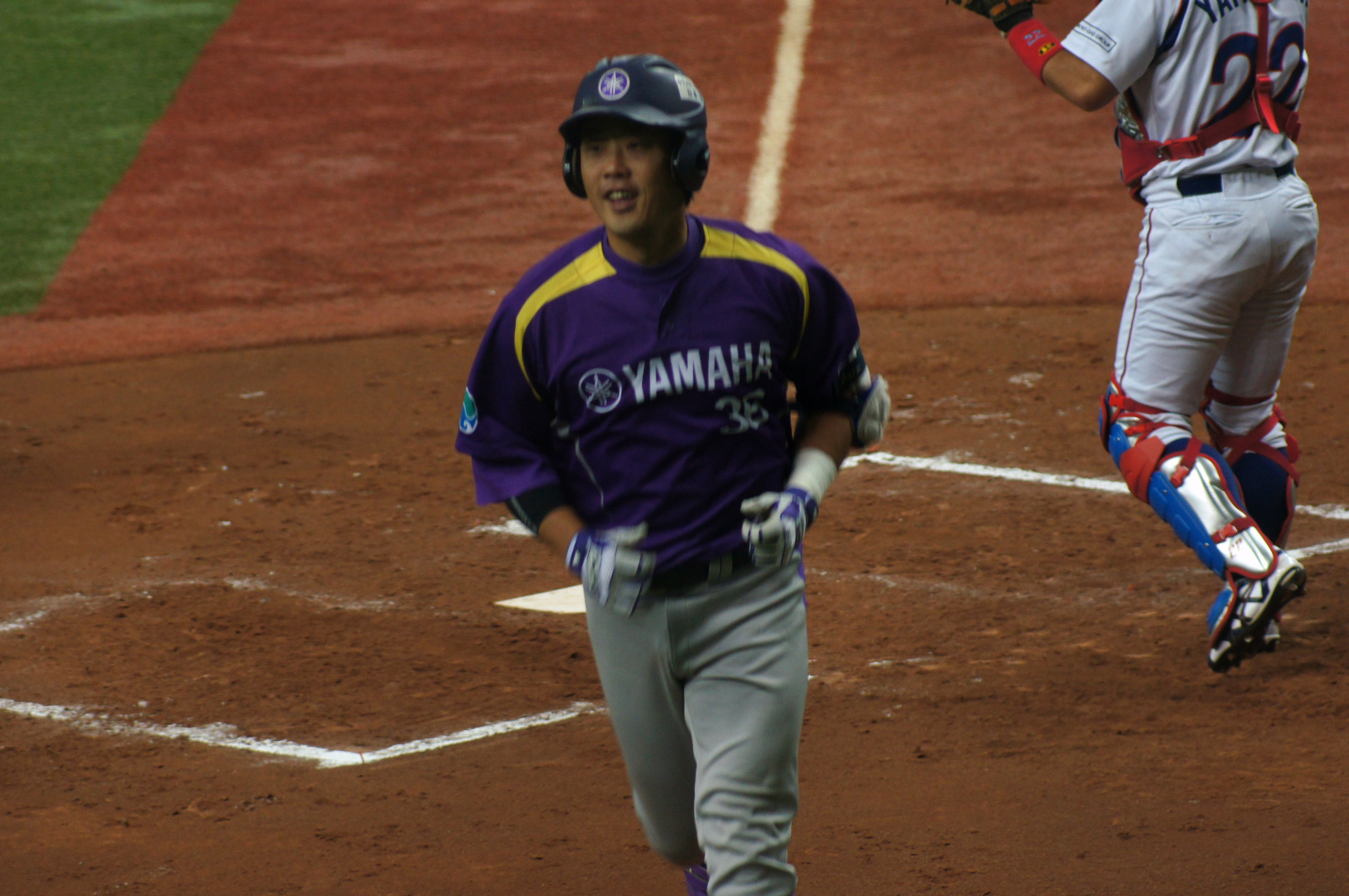
- Sato in 2016
- Second baseman
- Born: October 25, 1980 (age 45); Mogi das Cruzes, São Paulo, Brazil
- Bats: Right Throws: Right
- Stats at Baseball Reference

Reinaldo Tsuguio Sato (Jiro) (born October 25, 1980) is a Brazilian professional baseball second baseman. He played for the Yamaha club in the Japanese Industrial League.

== Career ==
He was signed by the Yakult Swallows and played from 1999–2003 when he was released. He has played in the industrial leagues since then.

== International career ==
He represented Brazil at the 1999 Pan American Games, 2003 Baseball World Cup, 2005 Baseball World Cup, 2007 Pan American Games, 2008 Olympics qualifying rounds and 2013 World Baseball Classic and 2019 Pan American Games Qualifier.

In 2025, Sato was announced as Brazil's manager for the 2025 Copa América.
