= Hugo Kanabushi =

Japanese baseball player (born 1989)

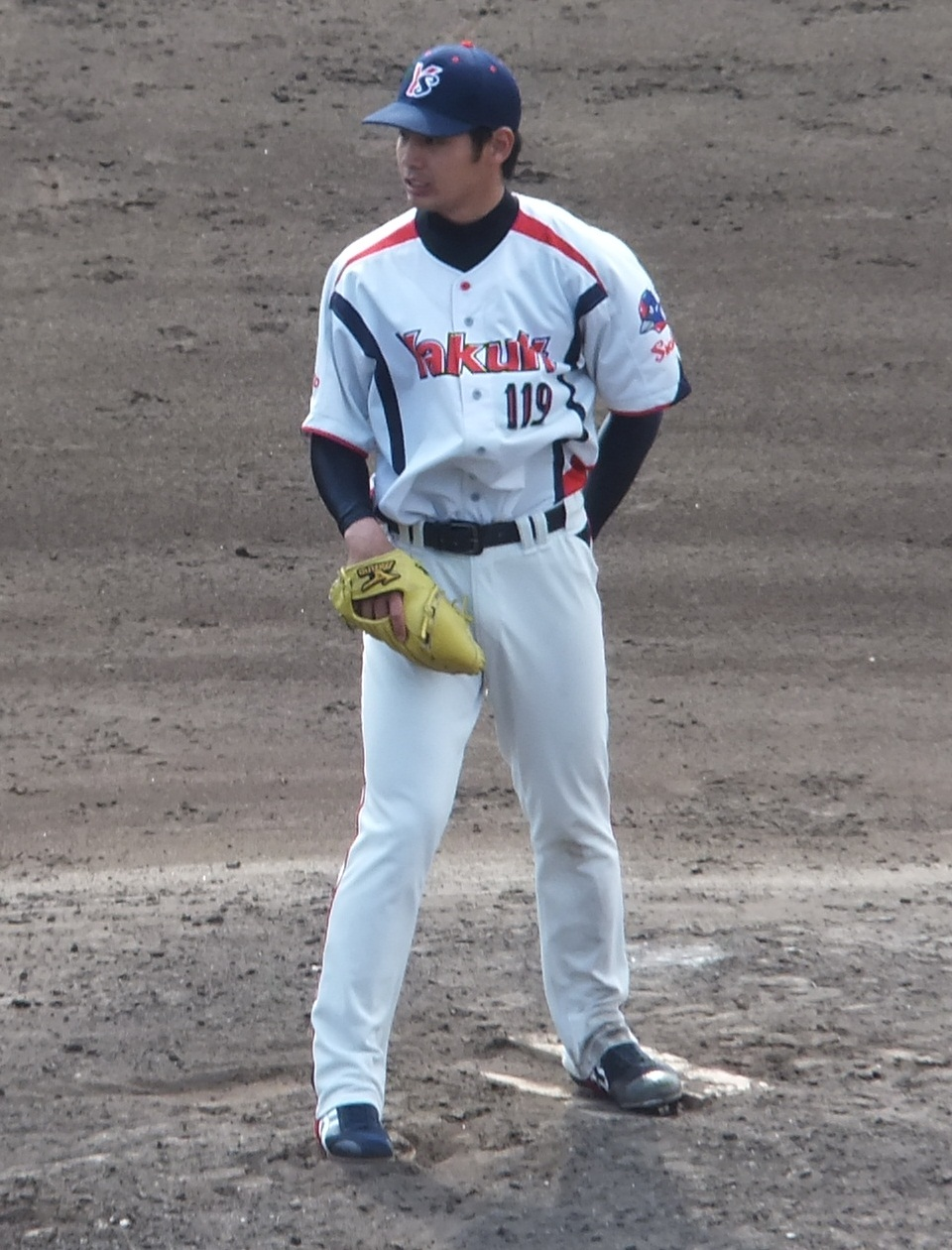
- Kanabushi with the Tokyo Yakult Swallows
- Pitcher
- Born: 22 May 1989 (age 36); Maringá, Paraná, Brazil
- Batted: Left Threw: Left

NPB debut
- October 3, 2012, for the Tokyo Yakult Swallows

Last NPB appearance
- July 28, 2015, for the Tokyo Yakult Swallows

NPB statistics
- Win–loss record: 0–0
- Earned run average: 27.00
- Strikeouts: 0
- Stats at Baseball Reference

Teams
- Tokyo Yakult Swallows (2012, 2015)

Hugo Kanabushi (born 22 May 1989) is a Brazilian former professional baseball pitcher. He played in Nippon Professional Baseball (NPB) for the Tokyo Yakult Swallows.

== Career ==
Kanabushi was selected for the Brazil national baseball team at the 2013 World Baseball Classic Qualification, 2013 World Baseball Classic, 2017 World Baseball Classic Qualification, and 2019 Pan American Games Qualifier.
