= Tiago Campos =

Tiago or Thiago Campos may refer to:

- Tiago Magalhães (born 1981), or Tiago Campos, Brazilian baseball outfielder
- Tiago Campos (swimmer) (born 1998), Portuguese marathon swimmer
