= Yuichi Matsumoto =

Brazilian baseball player (born 1980)

Daniel Yuichi Matsumoto
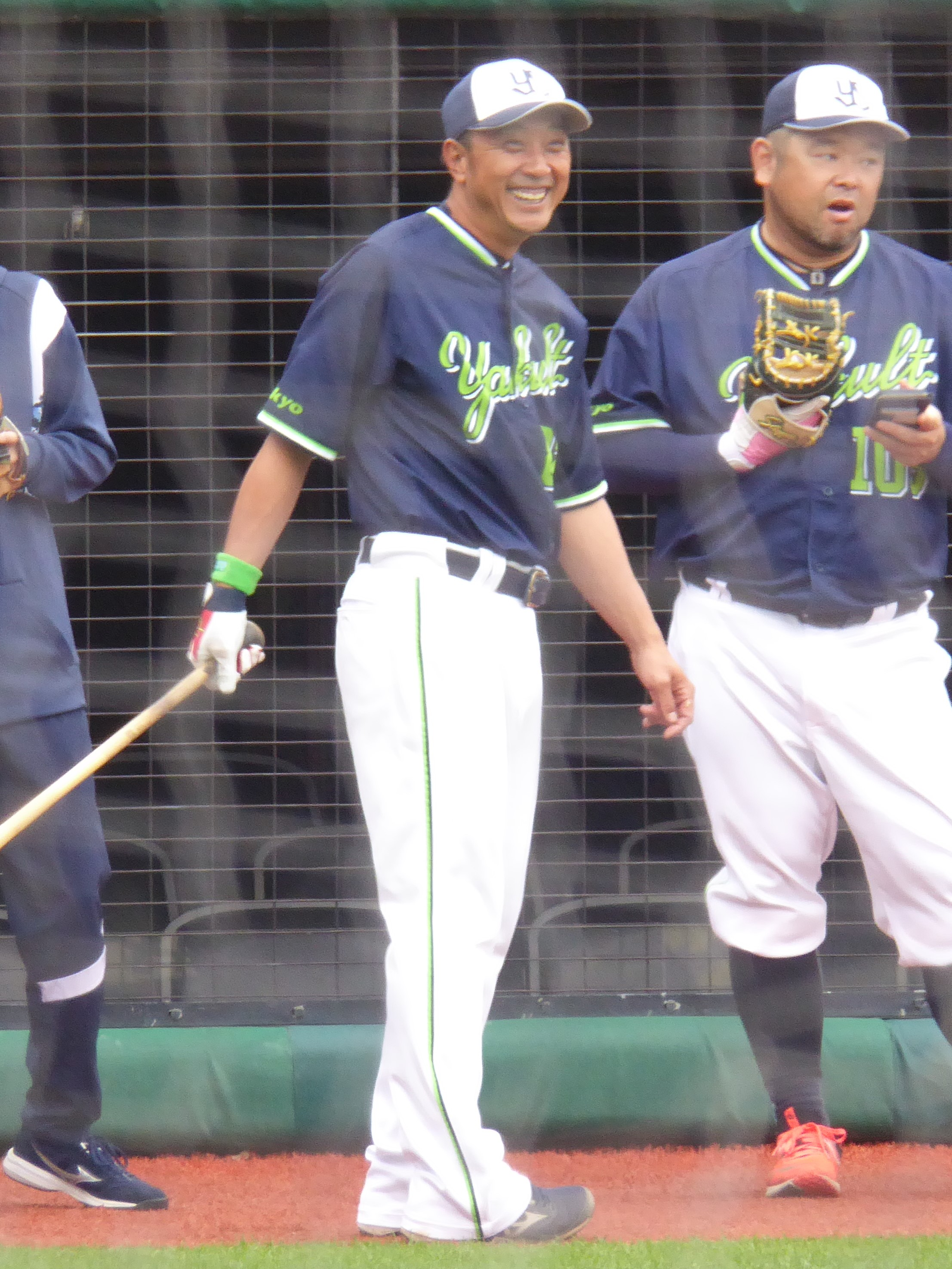

Tokyo Yakult Swallows – No. 82
- First baseman / Outfielder / Coach
- Born: December 18, 1980 (age 45); São Paulo, Brazil
- Batted: Left Threw: Left

NPB debut
- May 30, 2002, for the Yakult Swallows

Last NPB appearance
- October 4, 2015, for the Tokyo Yakult Swallows

NPB statistics
- Batting average: .263
- Home runs: 11
- Runs batted in: 115
- Stats at Baseball Reference

Teams
- As player: Yakult Swallows/Tokyo Yakult Swallows (1999–2015); As coach: Tokyo Yakult Swallows (2016–present); As manager: Tokyo Yakult Swallows (2022); Brazil national baseball team (2024–present)

Daniel Yuichi Matsumoto (松元 ユウイチ, Matsumoto Yūichi; born December 18, 1980) is a Japanese-Brazilian former professional baseball first baseman who played in Nippon Professional Baseball (NPB) for the Tokyo Yakult Swallows. He is one the lead managers of the main Brazil national baseball team and one of coaches of Tokyo Yakult Swallows.

He was born in São Paulo, in 1980. He signed with the Yakult Swallows in 1999. Though initially ineligible to be part of the first-squad roster due to the cap on foreign players, he gained Japanese citizenship in 2004 and played with the first team with increasing regularity.

Matsumoto represented the Brazil at the 1999 Pan American Games and at the 2002 Intercontinental Cup. At the 2013 World Baseball Classic, where Brazil qualified for the first time, he was named the team's captain.

In 2022, he managed the Swallows for a few games while the main manager was recovering from COVID-19.

In 2025, Matsumoto was appointed manager of the Brazil national baseball team for the 2026 World Baseball Classic qualifiers; he was the first native Brazilian manager to helm the team in WBC competition. Brazil defeated Germany in the qualifiers to clinch a spot in the main tournament in 2026.

At end of 2025, he became head coach for Swallows.
