= Murilo Gouvea =

Brazilian baseball player (born 1988)

Fortitudo Baseball – No. 34
- Pitcher
- Born: 15 September 1988 (age 37); Atibaia, São Paulo, Brazil
- Bats: Right Throws: Right
- Stats at Baseball Reference
Medals
Men's baseball
Representing Brazil
Pan American Games
Silver medal – second place	2023 Santiago	Team

Murilo Gouvea (born 15 September 1988) is a Brazilian professional baseball pitcher for Fortitudo Baseball of the Serie A. Gouvea previously played in minor league baseball in the Houston Astros organization.

Gouvea played for the Brazilian national baseball team in the 2013 World Baseball Classic. He played for Team Italy in the 2019 European Baseball Championship. He is playing for the team at the Africa/Europe 2020 Olympic Qualification tournament, taking place in Italy beginning 18 September 2019.

On 3 March 2022, Gouvea joined Fortitudo Baseball of the Serie A.

Gouvea was part of the Brazilian squad that won the silver medal at the 2023 Pan American Games contested in Santiago, Chile in October 2023.
