= Kléber Ojima =

Brazilian baseball coach and former player (born 1976)

- Pitcher / Coach
- Born: 4 December 1976 (age 49); Campinas, São Paulo, Brazil
- Bats: Right Throws: Right

CPBL debut
- March 5, 2004, for the Macoto Cobras

CPBL statistics
- Win–loss record: 9–6
- Earned run average: 2.48
- Strikeouts: 130
- Stats at Baseball Reference

Teams
- Macoto Cobras (2004, 2007)

Kléber Tomita Ojima (born 4 December 1976) is a Brazilian former professional baseball pitcher and current coach. He is currently the bullpen coach for the Brazil national baseball team.

== Playing career ==
Ojima was born in Campinas, São Paulo on 4 December 1976. He started playing baseball at seven, influenced by his father. His first team was ACA Tozan and later he moved to Mogi das Cruzes team where he played for 10 years and won five national titles.

Ojima was selected to represent Brazil at the 2003 Baseball World Cup played in Cuba, where he was awarded as the best pitcher of the tournament. He also participated in the 2004 Americas Olympic Baseball Qualifying Tournament (held in 2003), where he lost the quarterfinals game against Cuba 0–5. After the World Cup, in January 2004, Ojima moved to Taiwan to play with the Macoto Cobras of the Chinese Professional Baseball League.

After playing for the Macoto Cobras for nine months, Ojima had a shoulder injury and returned to Brazil to go under for surgery and rehabilitation. He returned to the Cobras for the 2007 season.

During his career, Ojima represented Brazil at the 1999, 2003 and 2007 Pan American Games.

== Coaching career ==
Ojima was the bullpen coach for the Brazil national baseball team at the 2023 World Baseball Classic qualification.
