= Marcio Tanaka =

Japanese-Brazilian baseball player

JR Kyushu
- Shortstop
- Born: June 9, 1980 (age 45); São Paulo, Brazil
- Bats: Right Throws: Right

Marcio Keizo Tanaka (born June 9, 1980) is a Japanese-Brazilian professional baseball shortstop, who plays for a team in the Japanese Industrial League. He attended Tokyo University of Agriculture and represented Brazil at 2013 World Baseball Classic.
