= Carlos Yoshimura =

Brazilian baseball player

Yamaha
- Pitcher
- Born: February 22, 1984 (age 42); Vargem Grande Paulista, São Paulo, Brazil
- Bats: Right Throws: Right
- Stats at Baseball Reference

Carlos Kenji Yoshimura (born February 22, 1984) is a Brazilian baseball pitcher. He attended Hakuoh University and has played for the Yamaha team in the Japanese Industrial League. He represented Brazil at the 2003 Pan American Games, 2003 Baseball World Cup and 2013 World Baseball Classic.
