= Ernesto Noris =

Cuban baseball player (born 1972)

- Pitcher
- Born: November 24, 1972 (age 53); Havana, Cuba
- Bats: Right Throws: Right

Ernesto Noris Chacón (born November 24, 1972) is a Cuban baseball pitcher. He played in the Serie Nacional Baseball for Industriales and then defected to Brazil where he played. He represented Brazil at the 2008 Americas Baseball Cup and the 2013 World Baseball Classic.
