= Jean Tome =

Brazilian baseball player

Jean Tomé

Atibaia Baseball Club
- Pitcher
- Born: February 2, 1987 (age 39); Atibaia, São Paulo, Brazil
- Bats: Right Throws: Right
- Stats at Baseball Reference
Medals
Men's baseball
Representing Brazil
Pan American Games
Silver medal – second place	2023 Santiago	Team

Jean Antonio Tomé (born February 2, 1987) is a Brazilian baseball infielder. He plays for the Atibaia Baseball Club in the Brazil Baseball League. He had earlier played for Seattle Mariners rookie league teams from 2007-2009. He represented Brazil at the 2013 World Baseball Classic.

Tomé was part of the Brazilian squad that won the silver medal at the 2023 Pan American Games contested in Santiago, Chile in October 2023.
