= Rafael Fernandes (baseball) =

Brazilian baseball player (born 1986)

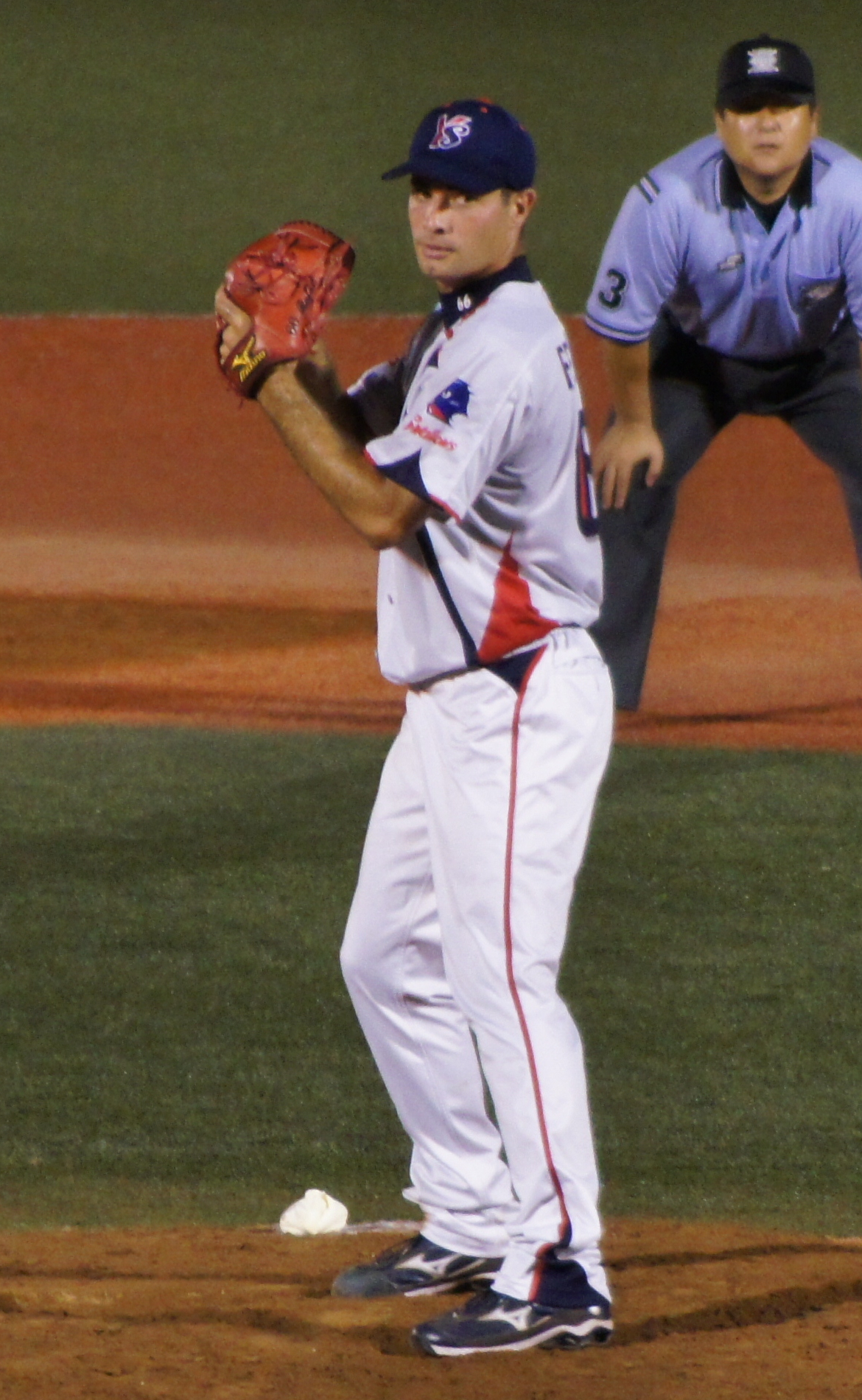
- Fernandes with the Tokyo Yakult Swallows

Free agent
- Pitcher
- Born: April 23, 1986 (age 40); São Paulo, Brazil
- Bats: Right Throws: Right

NPB debut
- August 6, 2011, for the Tokyo Yakult Swallows

NPB statistics (through 2013 season)
- Win–loss record: 1–0
- Earned run average: 8.31
- Strikeouts: 4
- Stats at Baseball Reference

Teams
- Tokyo Yakult Swallows (2009–2013)

Rafael Miranda Fernandes (Brazilian Portuguese: [ʁafaˈɛw feʁˈnɐ̃dʒis]; born April 23, 1986) is a Brazilian professional baseball pitcher who is a free agent. He has previously played in Nippon Professional Baseball (NPB) for the Tokyo Yakult Swallows.

== Career ==
=== Tokyo Yakult Swallows ===
Fernandes signed with the Tokyo Yakult Swallows of Nippon Professional Baseball in 2009. He made his NPB debut on August 6, 2011. In 10 NPB games, from 2011 to 2012, Fernandes pitched to a 1–0 record and 8.31 ERA with 4 strikeouts. He became a free agent after the 2013 season.

=== Canberra Cavalry ===
Fernandes signed with the Canberra Cavalry of the Australian Baseball League for the 2015/2016 season. He recorded a 2–3 record and 5.61 ERA with 36 strikeouts in 13 games.

=== Ibaraki Astro Planets ===
On April 17, 2021, Fernandes signed with the Ibaraki Astro Planets of the Baseball Challenge League.

== International career ==
He represented Brazil at the 2003 Baseball World Cup, 2005 Baseball World Cup and 2013 World Baseball Classic.
