= Bruno Hirata =

Brazilian baseball player (born 1988)

Toshiba
- Catcher
- Born: March 13, 1988 (age 38); Pilar do Sul, Brazil
- Bats: Right Throws: Right

Bruno Hirata Kaimoti (born March 13, 1988) is a Brazilian baseball catcher. He plays for the Toshiba club in the Japanese Industrial League. He represented Brazil at the 2008 Americas Baseball Cup and the 2013 World Baseball Classic.
