= Oscar Nakaoshi =

Brazilian baseball player (born 1991)

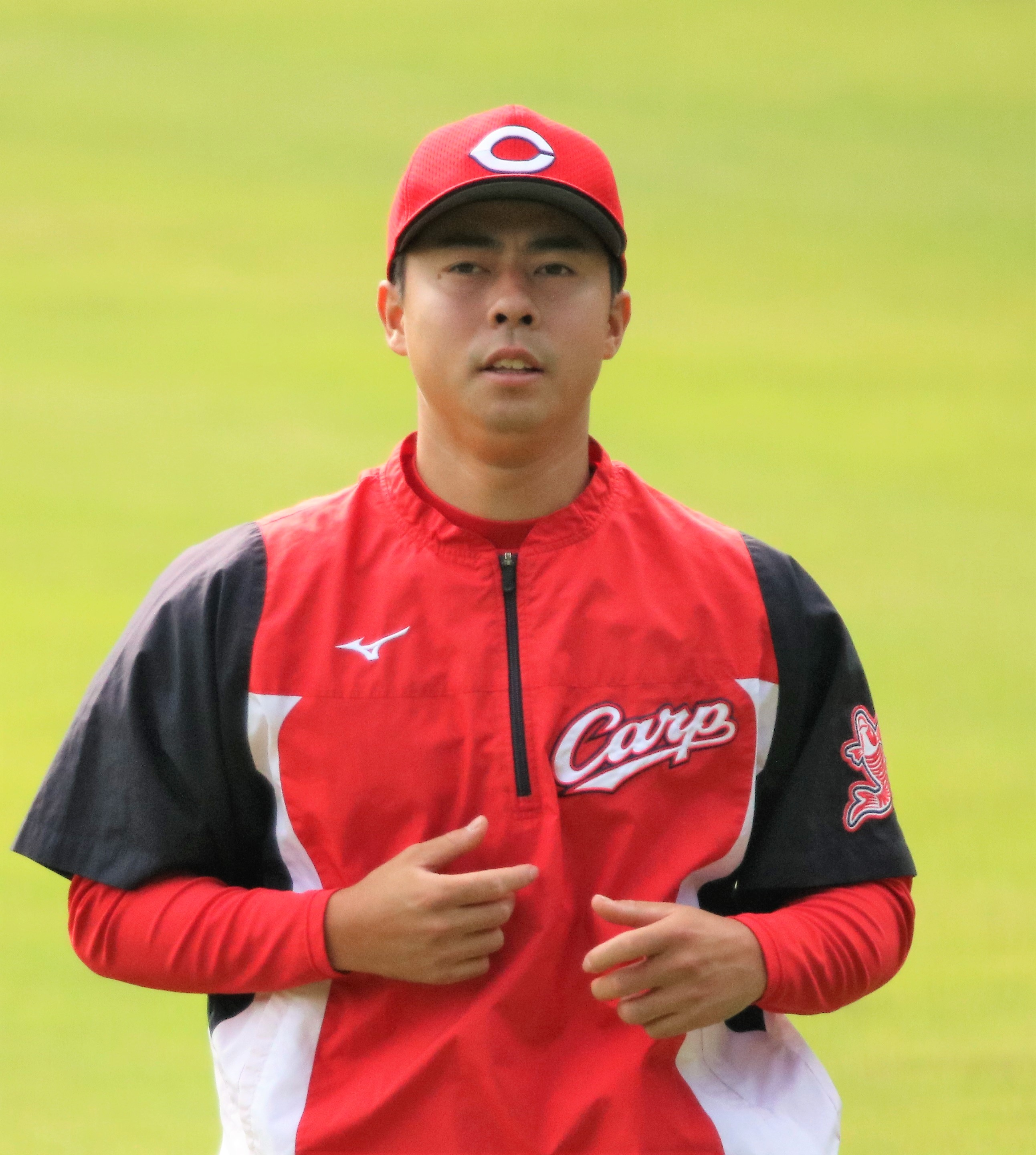
- Pitcher
- Born: March 28, 1991 (age 34); São Paulo, Brazil
- Batted: Left Threw: Left

NPB debut
- March 25, 2016, for the Hiroshima Toyo Carp

Last NPB appearance
- May 7, 2017, for the Hiroshima Toyo Carp

NPB statistics
- Win–loss record: 2–0
- Earned run average: 6.29
- Strikeouts: 13

Teams
- Hiroshima Toyo Carp (2016–2017)
Medals
Men's baseball
Representing Brazil
Pan American Games
Silver medal – second place	2023 Santiago	Team

Oscar Nakaoshi (born March 28, 1991) is a Brazilian professional baseball pitcher. He played in Nippon Professional Baseball (NPB) for the Hiroshima Toyo Carp. He attended Hakuoh University and represented Brazil at the 2013 World Baseball Classic.

== Career ==
Nakaoshi was part of the Brazilian squad that won the silver medal at the 2023 Pan American Games contested in Santiago, Chile in October 2023.
