= Iago Januario =

Brazilian baseball player

- First baseman
- Born: January 20, 1993 (age 33); Marília, Brazil
- Bats: Left Throws: Right
- Stats at Baseball Reference

Iago Ferreira Januario (born January 20, 1993) is a Brazilian former professional baseball first baseman. He represented Brazil at the 2013 World Baseball Classic.

He spent the 2010–2011 seasons as a pitcher for the Boston Red Sox Dominican Summer League team and was switched to first base when he signed with the Tampa Bay Rays in 2012 and played in the Venezuelan Summer League.
