= Felipe Burin =

Brazilian baseball player (born 1992)

- Infielder
- Born: February 10, 1992 (age 34); Marília, São Paulo, Brazil
- Bats: Left Throws: Right
- Stats at Baseball Reference

Felipe Augusto Matos Burin (born February 10, 1992) is a Brazilian former professional baseball infielder. He represented Brazil at the 2013 World Baseball Classic.

He spent 2009-2011 in the Venezuelan Summer League as a member of the Seattle Mariners and was promoted to the Arizona League Mariners in late 2011 and the Pulaski Mariners in 2012. Released after the season he signed with the Dodgers as a minor league free agent.
