= Baseball at the 2023 Pan American Games =

- Baseball pictogram
- Venues: Baseball and Softball Center; Cerillos, Chile
- Start date: October 18, 2023
- End date: October 28, 2023
- No. of events: 1 (1 men)
- Competitors: 192 from 8 nations

Medalists
Gold medal	Colombia
Silver medal	Brazil
Bronze medal	Mexico

Baseball competitions at the 2023 Pan American Games in Santiago, Chile were held from October 18 to 28. The venue for the competition was the Baseball and Softball Center, located in Cerillos, a suburb of Santiago.

A total of eight men's teams (each consisting of up to 24 players) will compete. Thus, a total of 192 athletes are scheduled to compete.

== Qualification ==
Eight men's teams will qualify to compete at the games in each tournament. The host nation (Chile) qualified automatically, along with the winner of the 2021 Junior Pan American Games, the winner of the South American Championship, the top four teams at the 2023 Central American and Caribbean Games and the winner of the 2023 Pan American Qualifying tournament.

Event	Dates	Location	Quota(s)	Qualified
Host Nation	—N/a	—N/a	1	Chile
2021 Junior Pan American Games	November 26 – December 2, 2021	(Colombia) Cali	1	Colombia
2022 South American Baseball Championship	July 24–30	(Peru) Lima	1	Brazil
Baseball at the 2023 Pan American Games Qualifier	June 16–21	(Argentina) Buenos Aires	1	Panama
2023 Central American and Caribbean Games	June 23 – July 8	(El Salvador) San Salvador	4	Mexico; Cuba; Venezuela; Dominican Republic
Total			8	

== Participating nations ==
8 countries qualified baseball teams. The numbers of participants qualified are in parentheses.

- Brazil (23)
- Chile (24)
- Colombia (24)
- Cuba (24)
- Dominican Republic (24)
- Mexico (24)
- Panama (24)
- Venezuela (24)

== Medalists ==
Event	Gold	Silver	Bronze
Men's tournament	Colombia; Francisco Acuña; Carlos Arroyo; Randy Consuegra; Carlos Mario Díaz; Leandro Emiliani; Kevin Escorcia; Santiago Florez; Rubén Galindo; Dilson Herrera; Jesús Marriaga; Carlos Martínez; Jorge Martínez; Hernando Mejía; Jaider Morelos; Luis Moreno; Jhon Peluffo; Fabián Pertuz; Derwin Pomare; Jorge Puerta; José Ramos; Jean Ruiz; Víctor Vargas; Julio Vivas; Ezequiel Zabaleta	Brazil; Gabriel Barbosa; Osvaldo Carvalho Jr. Victor Coutinho; Gabriel do Carmo; Ariel Frigo; Felipe Fukuda; Murilo Gouvea; Salomon Koba; Daniel Missaki; Felipe Mizukosi; Fábio Murakami; Oscar Nakaoshi; Felipe Natel; Pedro Okuda; Paulo Orlando; Eric Pardinho; Raphael Parra; André Rienzo; Lucas Rojo; Lucas Sakay; Enzo Sawayama; Douglas Takano; Jean Tomé	Mexico; Jasson Atondo; Emmanuel Ávila; Faustino Carrera; Fabián Cota; Jesús Cruz; Fernando Flores; Edson García; Moisés Gutiérrez; Miguel Guzmán; Francisco Haro; Arturo López; Luis Fernando Miranda; Aldo Montes; Carlos Morales; Norberto Obeso; Roberto Ramos; Wilmer Ríos; Randy Romero; Darel Torres; Édgar Torres; Roberto Valenzuela; Fernando Villegas; Alexis Wilson; Samuel Zazueta

== Opening round ==
All times are local (UTC−3).

=== Group A ===
Pos	Team	Pld	W	L	RF	RA	PCT	GB	Qualification
1	Panama	3	3	0	18	3	1.000	—	Super Round
2	Mexico	3	2	1	19	8	.667	1	Super Round
3	Dominican Republic	3	1	2	13	7	.333	2	Fifth place game
4	Chile (H)	3	0	3	2	34	.000	3	Seventh place game

Source: Santiago 2023 and WBSC Americas
(H) Hosts

October 18; 9:30	Mexico	16–0 (F/5)	Chile	Parque Bicentenario de Cerrillos, Cerrillos
October 18; 9:30		Boxscore		Parque Bicentenario de Cerrillos, Cerrillos

October 19; 9:30	Panama	4–1	Dominican Republic	Parque Bicentenario de Cerrillos, Cerrillos
October 19; 9:30		Boxscore		Parque Bicentenario de Cerrillos, Cerrillos

October 21; 9:30	Dominican Republic	0–1	Mexico	Parque Bicentenario de Cerrillos, Cerrillos
October 21; 9:30		Boxscore		Parque Bicentenario de Cerrillos, Cerrillos

October 21; 15:00	Chile	0–6	Panama	Parque Bicentenario de Cerrillos, Cerrillos
October 21; 15:00		Boxscore		Parque Bicentenario de Cerrillos, Cerrillos

October 23; 9:30	Panama	8–2	Mexico	Parque Bicentenario de Cerrillos, Cerrillos
October 23; 9:30		Boxscore		Parque Bicentenario de Cerrillos, Cerrillos

October 23; 15:00	Chile	2–12 (F/5)	Dominican Republic	Parque Bicentenario de Cerrillos, Cerrillos
October 23; 15:00		Boxscore		Parque Bicentenario de Cerrillos, Cerrillos

=== Group B ===
Pos	Team	Pld	W	L	RF	RA	PCT	GB	Qualification
1	Brazil	3	3	0	15	10	1.000	—	Super Round
2	Colombia	3	1	2	16	14	.333	2	Super Round
3	Cuba	3	1	2	11	13	.333	2	Fifth place game
4	Venezuela	3	1	2	9	14	.333	2	Seventh place game

Source: Santiago 2023 and WBSC Americas

October 19; 15:00	Venezuela	1–3	Brazil	Parque Bicentenario de Cerrillos, Cerrillos
October 19; 15:00		Boxscore		Parque Bicentenario de Cerrillos, Cerrillos

October 20; 9:30	Colombia	3–4	Cuba	Parque Bicentenario de Cerrillos, Cerrillos
October 20; 9:30		Boxscore		Parque Bicentenario de Cerrillos, Cerrillos

October 22; 9:30	Brazil	8–7 (F/9)	Colombia	Parque Bicentenario de Cerrillos, Cerrillos
October 22; 9:30		Boxscore		Parque Bicentenario de Cerrillos, Cerrillos

October 22; 15:00	Cuba	5–6	Venezuela	Parque Bicentenario de Cerrillos, Cerrillos
October 22; 15:00		Boxscore		Parque Bicentenario de Cerrillos, Cerrillos

October 24; 9:30	Brazil	4–2	Cuba	Parque Bicentenario de Cerrillos, Cerrillos
October 24; 9:30		Boxscore		Parque Bicentenario de Cerrillos, Cerrillos

October 24; 15:00	Colombia	6–2	Venezuela	Parque Bicentenario de Cerrillos, Cerrillos
October 24; 15:00		Boxscore		Parque Bicentenario de Cerrillos, Cerrillos

== Placement games ==
=== Seventh place game ===
October 25; 9:30	Chile	0–7	Venezuela	Parque Bicentenario de Cerrillos, Cerrillos
October 25; 9:30		Boxscore		Parque Bicentenario de Cerrillos, Cerrillos

=== Fifth place game ===
October 26; 15:30	Cuba	4–5	Dominican Republic	Parque Bicentenario de Cerrillos, Cerrillos
October 26; 15:30		Boxscore		Parque Bicentenario de Cerrillos, Cerrillos

== Super Round ==
Pos	Team	Pld	W	L	RF	RA	PCT	GB	Qualification
1	Brazil	3	2	1	14	15	.667	—	Gold medal game
2	Colombia	3	2	1	19	11	.667	—	Gold medal game
3	Panama	3	1	2	12	9	.333	1	Bronze medal game
4	Mexico	3	1	2	9	19	.333	1	Bronze medal game

Source: Santiago 2023 and WBSC Americas

October 25; 15:00	Brazil	5–3	Panama	Parque Bicentenario de Cerrillos, Cerrillos
October 25; 15:00		Boxscore		Parque Bicentenario de Cerrillos, Cerrillos

October 26; 9:30	Mexico	2–10	Colombia	Parque Bicentenario de Cerrillos, Cerrillos
October 26; 9:30		Boxscore		Parque Bicentenario de Cerrillos, Cerrillos

October 27; 9:30	Colombia	2–1	Panama	Parque Bicentenario de Cerrillos, Cerrillos
October 27; 9:30		Boxscore		Parque Bicentenario de Cerrillos, Cerrillos

October 27; 15:00	Mexico	5–1	Brazil	Parque Bicentenario de Cerrillos, Cerrillos
October 27; 15:00		Boxscore		Parque Bicentenario de Cerrillos, Cerrillos

== Medal games ==
=== Bronze medal game ===
October 28; 9:30	Mexico	10–2	Panama	Parque Bicentenario de Cerrillos, Cerrillos
October 28; 9:30		Boxscore		Parque Bicentenario de Cerrillos, Cerrillos

October 28, 2023 9:30 at Parque Bicentenario de Cerrillos in Cerrillos, Chile
Team	1	2	3	4	5	6	7	R	H	E
Mexico	0	1	0	6	0	1	2	10	14	1
Panama	0	0	0	0	2	0	0	2	6	2
WP: Luis Miranda LP: Davis Rodríguez; Umpires: HP – Julio Tibabijo, 1B – Ramiro Alfaro, 2B – Oscar Matamoros, 3B – Jorge Niebla; Boxscore

=== Gold medal game ===
October 28; 15:00	Colombia	9–1	Brazil	Parque Bicentenario de Cerrillos, Cerrillos
October 28; 15:00		Boxscore		Parque Bicentenario de Cerrillos, Cerrillos

October 28, 2023 15:00 at Parque Bicentenario de Cerrillos in Cerrillos, Chile
Team	1	2	3	4	5	6	7	R	H	E
Colombia	1	0	1	3	1	2	1	9	17	1
Brazil	0	1	0	0	0	0	0	1	4	0
WP: Víctor Vargas LP: Felipe Natel; Umpires: HP – Edwin Hernández, 1B – Emmanuel Pérez, 2B – Christian Madero, 3B – Gregori Jiménez; Boxscore

== Statistical leaders ==
=== Batting ===
Statistic	Name	Total
Batting average	(Mexico) Jasson Atondo	.615
Hits	(Colombia) Carlos Arroyo	11
Runs	(Colombia) Carlos Arroyo	8
Home runs	10 tied with	1
Runs batted in	(Colombia) Dilson Herrera	7
Slugging percentage	(Mexico) Jasson Atondo	1.000
Slugging percentage	(Venezuela) Eduardo Díaz	1.000

=== Pitching ===
Statistic	Name	Total
Wins	4 tied with (Note: Luis Fernando Miranda, Oscar Nakaoshi, Felipe Natel, Víctor Vargas)	2
Losses	3 tied with (Note: Jorge Martínez, Sebastián Vega, Carlos Viera)	2
Saves	(Panama) Severino González	2
Saves	(Brazil) Eric Pardinho	2
Innings pitched	(Brazil) Felipe Natel	11.2
Earned runs allowed	5 tied with	0.00
Strikeouts	(Mexico) Luis Fernando Miranda	9
Strikeouts	(Brazil) Felipe Natel	9

== Final standings ==
Pos	Team	Record
Gold medal	Colombia	4–2
Silver medal	Brazil	4–2
Bronze medal	Mexico	4–2
4	Panama	3–3
5	Dominican Republic	2–2
6	Cuba	1–3
7	Venezuela	2–2
8	Chile	0–4
