= Kesley Kondo =

Brazilian baseball player (born 1989)

- Pitcher
- Born: December 1, 1989 (age 36); São Paulo, Brazil
- Bats: Right Throws: Right
- Stats at Baseball Reference

Kesley Kondo (born December 1, 1989) is a Brazilian baseball pitcher. He attended Bloomington High School, West Los Angeles College and the University of Utah. He represented Brazil at the 2013 World Baseball Classic.
