= Leonardo Reginatto =

Brazilian baseball player (born 1990)

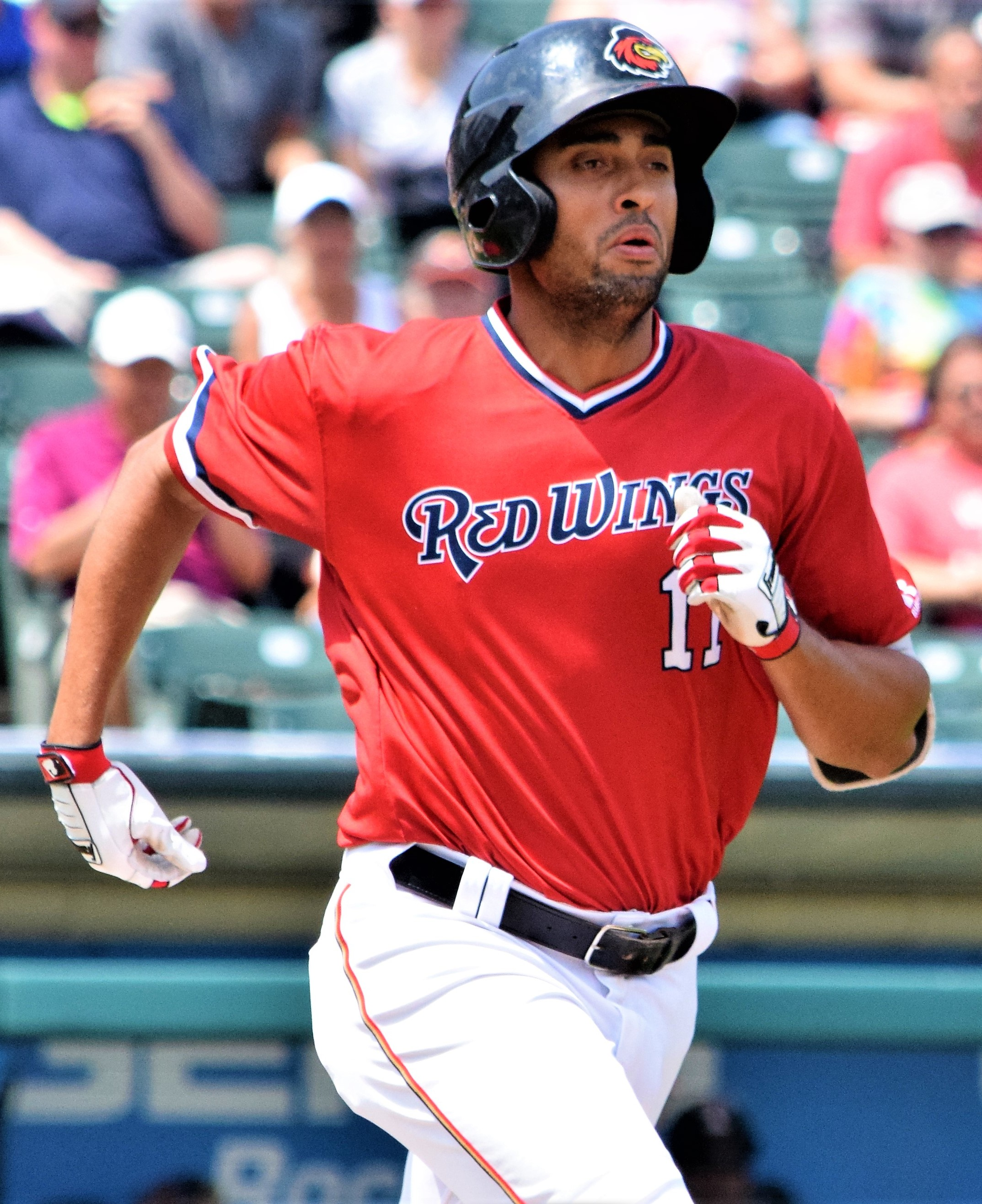
- Reginatto with the Rochester Red Wings in 2017
- Shortstop / Third baseman
- Born: April 10, 1990 (age 36); Curitiba, Brazil
- Bats: Right Throws: Right
- Stats at Baseball Reference

Leonardo Reginatto (born April 10, 1990) is a Brazilian former professional baseball third baseman. He has played in the Mexican Baseball League and also represents Brazil in international competition, including the 2013 and 2026 editions of the World Baseball Classic.

== Career ==
=== Tampa Bay Rays ===
On May 14, 2009, Reginatto signed with the Tampa Bay Rays organization at 19 years old as an international free agent. He made his professional debut with the VSL Rays. In 2010, Reginatto played for the Rookie-level Princeton Rays, slashing .279/.323/.344 with 4 RBI. The next year, he played for the Low-A Hudson Valley Renegades, posting a .198/.254/.251 slash line with 2 home runs and 17 RBI. Reginatto returned to Hudson Valley in 2012 and put up a far better .276/.329/.323 batting line with 1 home run and 29 RBI. In 2013, he played for the Single-A Bowling Green Hot Rods, slashing .325/.388/.393 with 1 home run and 49 RBI in 112 games. In 2014, Reginatto split the season between the High-A Charlotte Stone Crabs and the Double-A Montgomery Biscuits, accumulating a .292/.367/.340 slash line with 41 RBI. In 2015, Reginatto split the season between Montgomery and the Triple-A Durham Bulls, logging a .269/.323/.364 batting line with a career-high 3 home runs in 100 games. On November 6, 2015, he elected free agency.

=== Minnesota Twins ===
On December 18, 2015, Reginatto signed a minor league contract with the Minnesota Twins organization. For the 2016 season, Reginatto split the year between the Double-A Chattanooga Lookouts and the Triple-A Rochester Red Wings, batting a cumulative .265/.318/.327 with 2 home runs and 46 RBI. In 2017, he was invited to Spring Training but did not make the club and returned to Rochester and hit .303/.369/.390 with 3 home runs and 38 RBI. On November 6, 2017, he elected free agency. On December 8, Reginatto re-signed with Minnesota on a new minor league contract. In 2018, Reginatto again returned to Rochester, and batted .207/.255/.286 with 2 home runs and 21 RBI in 61 games. On November 2, 2018, he elected free agency.

=== Ottawa Champions ===
On March 6, 2019, Reginatto signed with the Ottawa Champions of the Can-Am League. In 92 games with Ottawa, Reginatto batted .300/.378/.332 with no home runs and 37 RBI. He became a free agent following the season.

=== West Virginia Power ===
On March 15, 2021, Reginatto signed with the West Virginia Power of the Atlantic League of Professional Baseball. Reginatto spent his tenure with the Power on the inactive list, and did not play in a game for the team before he was released on June 18.

=== Rieleros de Aguascalientes ===
On June 22, 2021, Reginatto signed with the Rieleros de Aguascalientes of the Mexican League.

In September 2022, Reginatto signed with the Yaquis de Obregón of the Mexican Pacific League. In November 2022, Reginatto signed with the Venados de Mazatlán of the Mexican Pacific League.

Reginatto played in 80 games for Aguascalientes in 2024, slashing .291/.374/.453 with 11 home runs, 48 RBI, and seven stolen bases.

=== Tigres de Quintana Roo ===
On October 22, 2024, Reginatto was traded to the Tigres de Quintana Roo of the Mexican League. Reginatto made 64 appearances for Quintana Roo in 2025, hitting .289/.351/.528 with 14 home runs and 42 RBI.

=== Olmecas de Tabasco ===
On July 10, 2025, Reginatto was traded to the Olmecas de Tabasco of the Mexican League in exchange for Wirfin Obispo and Randy Romero. In 17 appearances for Tabasco, he slashed .276/.364/.431 with two home runs and nine RBI. Reginatto was released by the Olmecas on December 2.

== Coaching Career ==
In 2026, Reginatto was named as hitting coach for the DSL Rays the summer-league affiliate of the Tampa Bay Rays.
