= Tiago Magalhães =

Brazilian baseball player (born 1981)

Guarulhos Baseball Club
- Outfield
- Born: March 18, 1981 (age 44); São Paulo, Brazil
- Bats: Right Throws: Right
- Stats at Baseball Reference

Tiago de Oliveira Magalhaes (a.k.a. Tiago Campos) (born March 18, 1981) is a Brazilian baseball outfielder. He plays for Guarulhos Baseball Club in the Brazil Baseball League.

== Career ==
He played in the Cincinnati Reds farm system from 2000-2004, but never moved above Class-A before he was released. He also apparently played in Japan at one point.

== International career ==
He represented Brazil at the 2002 Intercontinental Cup, 2003 Baseball World Cup, 2005 Baseball World Cup, 2007 Pan American Games and the 2013 World Baseball Classic and 2019 Pan American Games Qualifier.
