= Shane Livensparger =

American baseball umpire (born 1984)

MLB – No. 43
- Umpire
- Born: January 13, 1984 (age 42); Bryan, Ohio, U.S.

MLB debut
- June 10, 2017
- Stats at Baseball Reference

Crew information
- Umpiring crew: A
- Crew members: #2 Dan Bellino (crew chief); #90 Mark Ripperger; #43 Shane Livensparger; #3 Dan Merzel

Career highlights and awards
- Special assignments: Division Series (2026); Wild Card Series (2025); MLB Little League Classic (2025)

Shane Alan Livensparger /ˈlɪvənˌspɑːrɡər/ (born January 13, 1984) is an American Major League Baseball (MLB) umpire who began his career in the Minor Leagues in 2009. He was promoted to full time major league staff in 2023. He wears uniform number 43.

== Early life ==
Shane Alan Livensparger was born on January 13, 1984, to parents Tammy and K.C. in Bryan, Ohio. During his childhood, the family relocated to Angola, Indiana, where he graduated from Angola High School in 2002. He began umpiring youth and senior league baseball after high school, and continued when he moved to Florida to attend Flagler College. While in college, he befriended minor league umpire Justin Vogel, who became one of his mentors, and worked high school and college baseball games. He graduated in 2006.

At some point prior to 2010, Livensparger's parents separated and his mother remarried.

== Umpiring career ==
Livensparger was one of 150 students in the 2009 class of the five week Jim Evans Academy of Professional Umpiring, and one of only 25 to advance to the evaluation course. In March 2009, he went on to a Professional Baseball Umpires Corp evaluation course with 50 others, and was one of 25 to pass.

In 2010, his professional career started with the New York–Penn League. In 2011, he was promoted to the South Atlantic League. In 2012, he was with the Florida State League. In 2013 and 2014, he was with the Southern League. In 2015, he was with the International League. In 2015 and 2016, he was with the Venezuelan Professional Baseball League (winter league). In 2017, he worked the 2017 World Baseball Classic qualifiers.

On June 10, 2017, he made his MLB debut in a doubleheader between the Oakland Athletics and Tampa Bay Rays.

In 2023, he was promoted to the major leagues as a full-time umpire, after working 382 Major League games as a call-up umpire.

On August 17, 2026, during a Major League Baseball game between the Miami Marlins and the Philadelphia Phillies at Citizens Bank Park, first-base umpire Shane Livensparger incorrectly called a fair ball foul in the top of the seventh inning. With the bases loaded and two outs while the Marlins trailed, Javier Sanoja hit a line drive down the first-base line that struck the foul line in right-field territory. Livensparger, attempting to avoid the ball, ruled it foul; Marlins manager Clayton McCullough challenged the decision, and replay review overturned the call, awarding Sanoja a double and allowing two runs to score. Runner Otto López was placed at third base rather than home, prompting McCullough to argue the placement of the runners; he was ejected by third-base umpire Todd Tichenor. The Marlins went on to lose the contest 6–5.

== Personal life ==
Livensparger worked various jobs before becoming a full-time umpire. He spent four years as a sports management intern for the City of Jacksonville, he was a lifeguard for the St John's County Marine Rescue unit, and spent time as a scuba diving instructor in Honduras. He was also a personal trainer, and was certified as an EMT in 2005.

In January 2020, Livensparger swore in to the Georgia Air National Guard. However, two months later, the COVID-19 pandemic delayed his training. In the 2022-23 MLB off-season, he was able to attend officer training and graduated as a second lieutenant in December 2022.

He has a wife, Haley Livensparger, and a son, Bennett. He currently resides in Jacksonville, Florida.

== See also ==
- List of Major League Baseball umpires
