= André Rienzo =

Brazilian baseball player & coach (born 1988)

Andre Rienzo
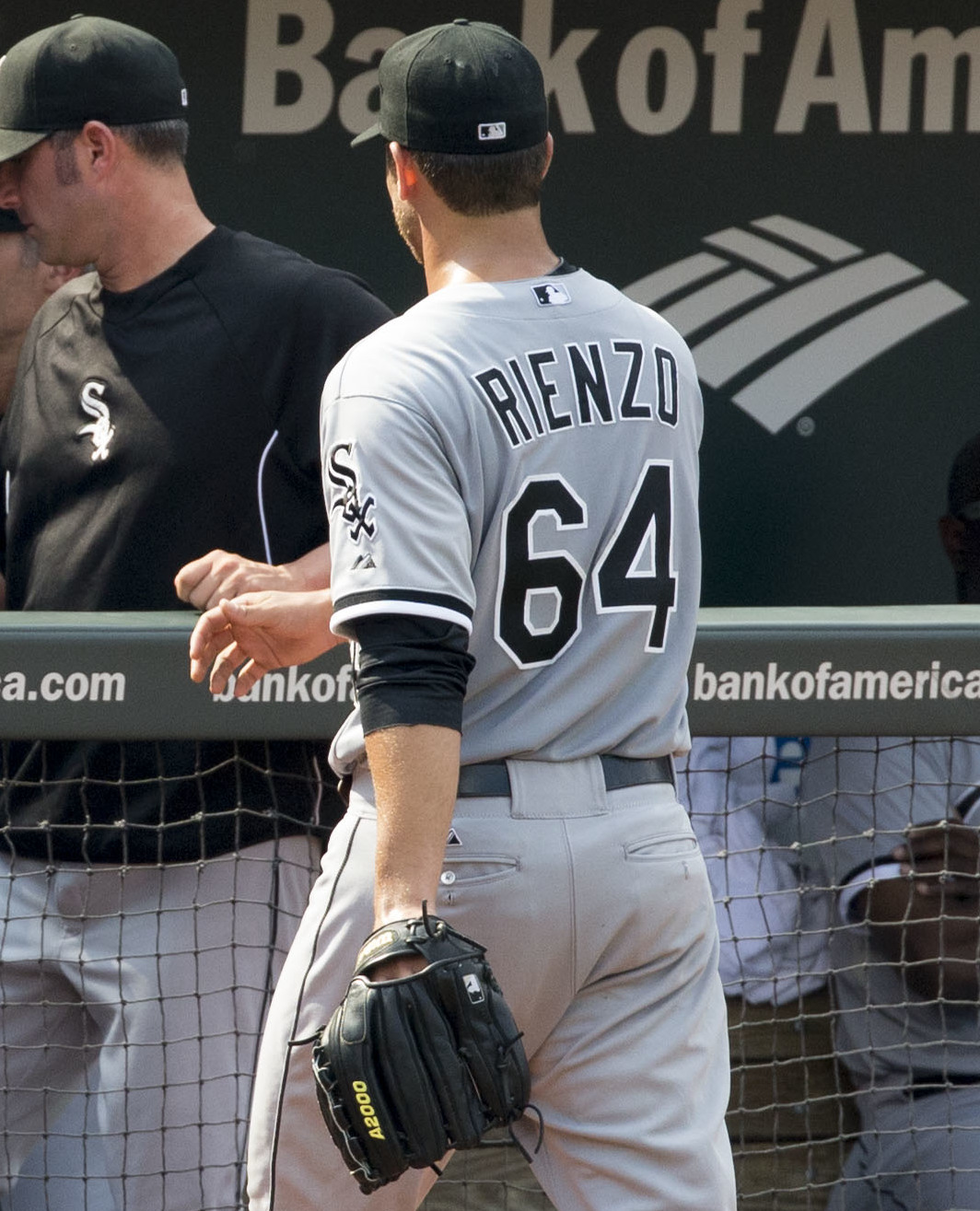
- Rienzo with the Chicago White Sox in 2013
- Pitcher
- Born: July 5, 1988 (age 37); São Paulo, Brazil
- Batted: Right Threw: Right

MLB debut
- July 30, 2013, for the Chicago White Sox

Last MLB appearance
- October 4, 2015, for the Miami Marlins

MLB statistics
- Win–loss record: 6–9
- Earned run average: 5.90
- Strikeouts: 104
- Stats at Baseball Reference

Teams
- Chicago White Sox (2013–2014); Miami Marlins (2015)
Medals
Men's baseball
Representing Brazil
Pan American Games
Silver medal – second place	2023 Santiago	Team

André Albanez Rienzo (born July 5, 1988) is a Brazilian former professional baseball pitcher. He played in Major League Baseball (MLB) for the Chicago White Sox and Miami Marlins. Rienzo represented Brazil in the 2013 World Baseball Classic, and currently serves as the pitching coach for the Brazil national baseball team as well as a pundit for baseball matches on ESPN Brasil. Rienzo was the first Brazilian-born pitcher to start and win an MLB game.

== Early life ==
Rienzo was raised with his two older brothers by his mother in São Paulo, Brazil. Following his parents' divorce, Rienzo's mother decided that the best way to keep Rienzo and his brothers out of trouble was to follow the example of the large Japanese community in Brazil. Rienzo's mother played softball and her sons were among the few to play baseball in their area; in Brazil, both sports are niche sports primarily played by Japanese-Brazilians. A Cuban pitching coach and scout eventually helped Rienzo to develop his four-pitch arsenal.

== Professional career ==
=== Chicago White Sox ===
The Chicago White Sox signed Rienzo as an international free agent on November 17, 2006. He played in 7 games (3 starts) for the Dominican Summer League White Sox 2, where he went 1–1 with a 7.63 ERA, striking out 22 in 15 1/3 innings. Rienzo split 2008 with the DSL White Sox 1 and 2, where in 8 games (7 starts), he went 5–1 with a 1.33 ERA, striking out 44 in 40 2/3 innings. Rienzo spent 2009 with Bristol White Sox of the Rookie-level Appalachian League, where in 13 games (9 starts), he went 2–6 with a 4.14 ERA, striking out 49 in 54 1/3 innings. Rienzo played 2010 with the Kannapolis Intimidators of the Single–A South Atlantic League, where in 20 games (18 starts), he went 8–4 with a 3.65 ERA, striking out 125 in 101 innings.

Rienzo spent 2011 with the Winston-Salem Dash of the Low–A Carolina League, where in 25 games (22 starts), he went 6–5 with a 3.41 ERA, striking out 118 in 116 innings. He was named a Carolina League midseason All-Star. Rienzo began 2012 with Winston-Salem, but on April 26, Rienzo was suspended for 50 games following a positive test for metabolites of stanozolol. After the suspension, Rienzo pitched for the Birmingham Barons of the Double–A Southern League, and he also made a start in September for the Charlotte Knights of the Triple–A International League. In 18 total starts, he went 7–3 with a 2.53 ERA, striking out 113 in 103 1/3 innings. Rienzo pitched for the Salt River Rafters in the Arizona Fall League after the 2012 season, but he left early to join the Brazilian national baseball team in the 2013 World Baseball Classic qualifying round. On November 19, 2012, the White Sox added Rienzo to their 40-man roster to protect him from the Rule 5 draft.

Rienzo began 2013 with Charlotte, where he went 8–6 in 20 starts with a 4.06 ERA before being recalled on July 30 by the White Sox to make a spot start for Jake Peavy, who was scratched amid trade rumors. Rienzo made his major league debut against the Cleveland Indians pitching seven innings, giving up three unearned runs, three walks and six strikeouts, with a no-decision in a 7–4 loss to fellow Brazilian Yan Gomes' Indians. On August 21, 2013, Rienzo got his first Major League win in a 5–2 victory over the Kansas City Royals. In 10 starts for Chicago during his rookie campaign, he compiled a 2–3 record and 4.82 ERA with 38 strikeouts across 56 innings of work.

=== Miami Marlins ===
On December 11, 2014, the White Sox traded Rienzo to the Miami Marlins in exchange for Dan Jennings. In 14 games for Miami in 2015, he compiled a 5.95 ERA with 15 strikeouts across 19 2/3 innings pitched.

On January 13, 2016, Rienzo was designated for assignment to make room for newly signed righty Edwin Jackson. He cleared waivers and was sent outright to the Triple–A New Orleans Zephyrs on January 20. In 34 appearances split between New Orleans, the Double–A Jacksonville Suns, High–A Jupiter Hammerheads, and rookie–level Gulf Coast League Marlins, he compiled a 2.85 ERA with 46 strikeouts and 8 saves. Rienzo was released by the Marlins organization on September 3.

=== San Diego Padres ===
On December 13, 2016, Rienzo signed a minor league contract with the San Diego Padres organization. In 21 games for the Triple–A El Paso Chihuahuas, he logged a 2.83 ERA with 39 strikeouts in 41 1/3 innings pitched. He served as an ESPN Brasil commentator during the 2017 World Series. Rienzo elected free agency following the season on November 6, 2017.

=== Acereros de Monclova ===
On June 12, 2018, Rienzo signed with the Acereros de Monclova of the Mexican League. In 2018, André Rienzo led the Mexican League with an 0.76 ERA in 47 1/3 innings pitched. As of 2023, Rienzo holds the all-time LMB record for the lowest ERA in a season with at least 30 innings pitched.

Rienzo made six starts for Monclova during the 2019 season, posting a 3-2 record and 5.59 ERA with 27 strikeouts over 29 innings of work.

=== Tecolotes de los Dos Laredos ===
On December 14, 2019, Rienzo was traded to the Tecolotes de los Dos Laredos of the Mexican League. Rienzo did not play in a game in 2020 due to the cancellation of the Mexican League season because of the COVID-19 pandemic. In 2021, Rienzo posted a 3–0 record with a 2.57 ERA in 5 starts. He suffered a right knee injury in a start against the Algodoneros de Unión Laguna on June 19, and later underwent surgery for a torn meniscus. Rienzo was placed on the reserve list on June 27, 2021.

=== Leones de Yucatán ===
After spending 2022 out of professional baseball, Rienzo returned to the Mexican League on May 22, 2023 upon signing with the Leones de Yucatán. He struggled to a 0–3 record with a 11.32 ERA and 23 strikeouts in 20 2/3 innings. Rienzo was waived by the Leones on June 28.

== International career ==
Rienzo was selected for the Brazil national baseball team at the 2013 World Baseball Classic Qualification, 2013 World Baseball Classic, 2017 World Baseball Classic Qualification, 2019 Pan American Games Qualifier, and 2021 World Baseball Classic Qualifier.

Rienzo was part of the Brazilian squad that won the silver medal at the 2023 Pan American Games contested in Santiago, Chile in October 2023.

== Coaching career ==
On January 25, 2025, Rienzo was announced as the pitching coach for the Brazil national baseball team in the upcoming 2026 World Baseball Classic.

== Personal life ==
Rienzo's nephew, Pietro, is a professional baseball pitcher.
