= J. C. Muñiz =

Cuban baseball player (born 1976)

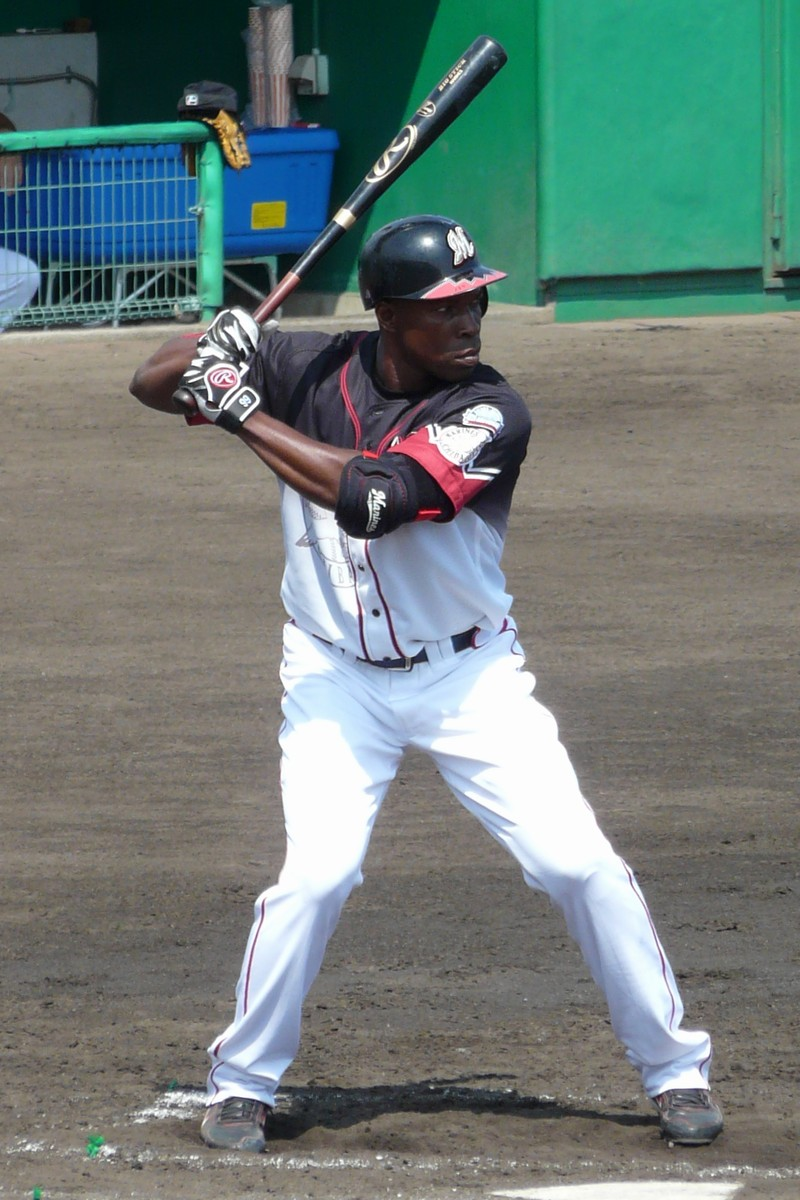
- Outfielder
- Born: January 28, 1976 (age 50); Havana, Cuba
- Batted: Right Threw: Right

NPB debut
- June 6, 2010, for the Chiba Lotte Marines

Last NPB appearance
- September 4, 2010, for the Chiba Lotte Marines

NPB statistics
- Batting average: .136
- Home runs: 0
- Runs batted in: 1
- Stats at Baseball Reference

Teams
- Chiba Lotte Marines (2010)

Career highlights and awards
- Japan Series champion (2010)

Juan Carlos Muñiz Armenteros (born January 28, 1976) is a Cuban-Brazilian baseball outfielder.

Muñiz is originally from Cuba and started his professional baseball career in the Cuban National Series. After the 2001 season, he traveled legally to Brazil but overstayed his visa while hoping to defect to the United States. He ended up getting Brazilian citizenship before get signed by the Florida Marlins after a tryout in 2003 but the club had to wait another two years for him to get an American visa. During that time, he played and coached baseball in Brazil.

Muñiz played in the Florida Marlins minor league system in 2005 and 2006 and played for the Chiba Lotte Marines of Nippon Professional Baseball in 2009 and 2010, during his play for marines, his son J.C Muñiz Jr. was born.

He represented Brazil at the 2013 World Baseball Classic.

In early 2025, his son J.C Muñiz Jr., Got a development contract with Pittisburg Pirates as a Pitcher
