= Paulo Orlando =

Brazilian baseball coach and former player (born 1985)

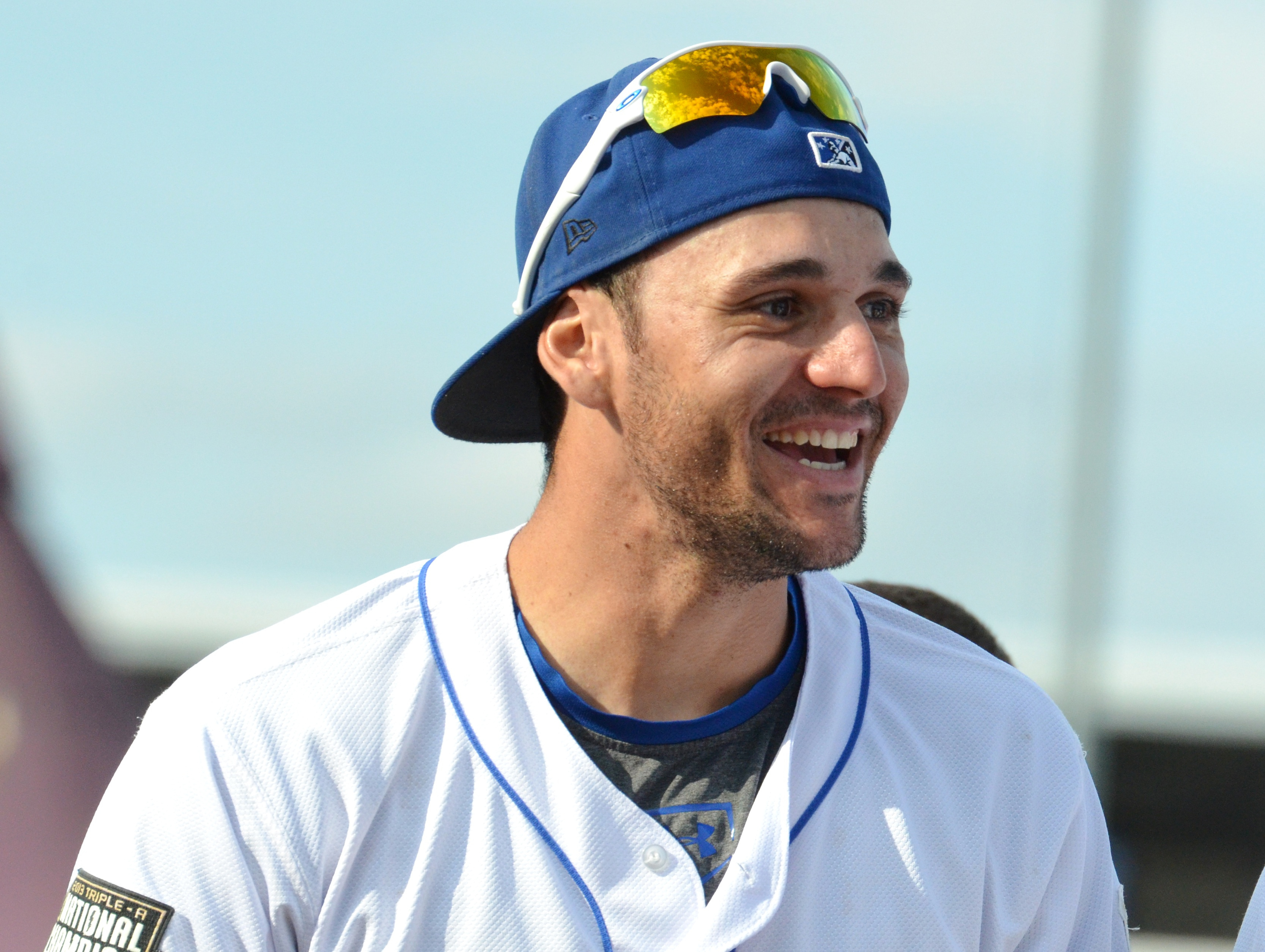
- Orlando with the Omaha Storm Chasers
- Outfielder
- Born: November 1, 1985 (age 40); São Paulo, Brazil
- Batted: Right Threw: Right

MLB debut
- April 9, 2015, for the Kansas City Royals

Last MLB appearance
- July 23, 2018, for the Kansas City Royals

MLB statistics
- Batting average: .263
- Home runs: 14
- Runs batted in: 81
- Stolen bases: 18
- Stats at Baseball Reference

Teams
- Kansas City Royals (2015–2018)

Career highlights and awards
- World Series champion (2015)
Medals
Men's baseball
Representing Brazil
Pan American Games
Silver medal – second place	2023 Santiago	Team

Paulo Roberto Orlando (Portuguese: [ˈpawlu oʁˈlɐ̃du]; born November 1, 1985) is a Brazilian former professional baseball outfielder. He played in Major League Baseball (MLB) for the Kansas City Royals. He represented Brazil at the 2013 World Baseball Classic, and currently serves as the baserunning coach for the Brazil national baseball team.

== Early life ==
Paulo Orlando was born in São Paulo, Brazil. His mother is a nurse. When Orlando was 12 years old, a Japanese-Brazilian physician who worked with Orlando's mother recommended that he try his hand at baseball, an obscure sport primarily played by the Japanese community in Brazil. Orlando was nicknamed "gaijin" by teammates because he was one of so few players who was not of Japanese descent. Because baseball fields were so few, Orlando could only play baseball on weekends. He relied mostly on his speed and was not among the best players on his youth teams. However, as was typical in Brazil, most of his teammates abandoned the sport as they got older.

Growing up, in addition to baseball, he played association football (soccer). In his early teens, he also took up track and field. He ran the 200-meter sprint in 21 seconds and the 400-meter dash in 46.36 seconds for the Brazilian Youth Olympic team. In 2005, he quit track to focus on baseball; he began playing in the Dominican Republic and Venezuela.

== Professional career ==
=== Chicago White Sox ===
Orlando was discovered and signed by a Cuban scout for the Chicago White Sox in 2005. He was named the fastest base runner in the White Sox system for the 2006 and 2007 seasons, as well as best defensive outfielder for the 2007 season.

=== Kansas City Royals ===
Orlando was traded to the Royals on August 9, 2008, in exchange for pitcher Horacio Ramírez. He led the Carolina League in triples in 2008 while playing for the Winston-Salem Warthogs in the White Sox system and the Wilmington Blue Rocks in the Royals system. In 2010 with the Northwest Arkansas Naturals, he hit .305 with 13 homers, 64 RBI and 25 steals to earn Texas League All-Star honors. There was some talk that he would be added to the Royals' 40-man roster after the season, but a poor showing in the Puerto Rican winter league left him off the roster. He became the third Brazilian-born player, and first non-pitcher, to make it to Triple-A when he was promoted to the Omaha Storm Chasers to start 2011. He returned to the Northwest Arkansas Naturals in mid-2011 through 2012, then played for the Omaha Storm Chasers in 2013 and 2014. In 2014, he was named the fastest base runner in the Pacific Coast League. In all, he played 1,017 minor league games.

==== 2015 ====
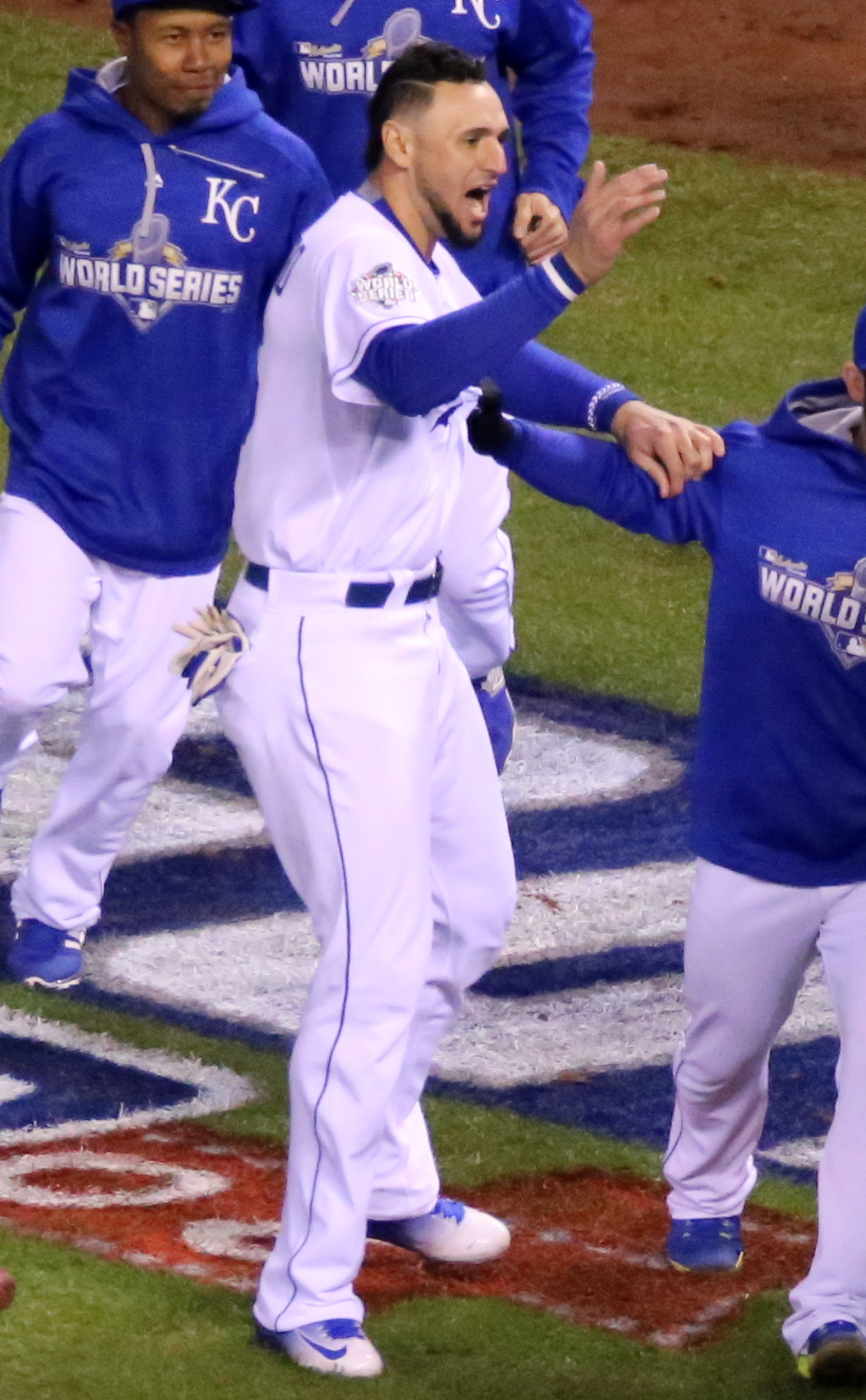
Orlando celebrating the 2015 World Series

After the 2014 season, Orlando was added to the Royals 40-man roster. He made the Royals opening day roster in 2015 and made his major league debut on April 9, becoming the third Brazilian-born player in MLB history. His first major league hit, a triple off Chicago White Sox pitcher John Danks, was also the first MLB hit for a born-and-raised Brazilian player. Three days later, Orlando became the first player in MLB history to record three triples as his first three base hits. On April 20, Orlando hit his fifth triple in his first seven games, establishing a new major league record for "the fewest games to hit five triples to open a career".

On May 26, Orlando hit his first major league home run in a game against the New York Yankees. On July 7, Orlando hit a walk-off grand slam against Brad Boxberger of the Tampa Bay Rays in the first game of a double-header; it was his second career home run and first-ever grand slam. He was optioned to Omaha Storm Chasers on July 29 to make room for Ben Zobrist.

He became the first Brazilian-born player to win a World Series on November 1, 2015, his 30th birthday. Orlando is the most recent MLB player to appear in a World Series-clinching game on their birthday.

==== 2016 ====
Prior to the start of the 2016 season, Orlando and Jarrod Dyson were considered most likely to platoon in right field, though the Royals announced plans for an open competition in spring training. He ended up playing the majority of the season as the right fielder for the Royals, playing in 105 games and hitting .302 with five home runs and 43 RBI.

==== 2017 ====
The 2017 season was a rough one for Orlando as he struggled with inconsistency and injury, hitting just .198 in 39 games.

==== 2018 ====
Orlando played in 25 games for the Royals in 2018, hitting .167/.194/.200 with no home runs and five RBI. On November 2, 2018, he was removed from the 40–man roster and sent outright to Triple–A Omaha. However, he subsequently rejected the assignment and elected free agency.

=== Los Angeles Dodgers ===
On January 4, 2019, Orlando signed a minor league contract with the Los Angeles Dodgers that included an invitation to spring training. He hit .211 with two home runs, seven RBI, and one stolen bases in 24 games for the Triple–A Oklahoma City Dodgers.

=== Chicago White Sox (second stint) ===
On May 10, 2019, he was traded to the Chicago White Sox. In 69 games for the Triple–A Charlotte Knights, he batted .242/.299/.426 with 10 home runs and 32 RBI. Orlando was released by the White Sox organization on August 19.

=== Tecolotes de los Dos Laredos ===
On March 12, 2020, Orlando signed with the Somerset Patriots of the Atlantic League of Professional Baseball. He did not appear in a game for the club, as the season was canceled due to the COVID-19 pandemic. On July 3, 2020, Orlando's contract was purchased by the Tecolotes de los Dos Laredos of the Mexican League for the 2021 season. In 11 appearances for Dos Laredos, he batted .250/.308/.313 with one home run and four RBI. Orlando was released by the Tecolotes on June 4, 2021.

=== El Águila de Veracruz ===
On June 5, 2021, Orlando signed with El Águila de Veracruz of the Mexican League. In 50 appearances for Veracruz, Orlando slashed .326/.385/.460 with six home runs and 34 RBI.

=== Kansas City Monarchs ===
On August 28, 2021, Orlando was loaned to the Kansas City Monarchs of the American Association of Professional Baseball. In eight appearances for Kansas City, he batted .240/.333/.280 with no home runs and two RBI. Orlando and the Monarchs won the 2021 American Association championship series over the Fargo-Moorhead RedHawks.

On January 29, 2022, Orlando was returned to El Águila de Veracruz of the Mexican League and officially signed with the team. However, he was released prior to the season on April 18, after suffering an injury in spring training.

== International career ==
Orlando was part of the Brazilian squad that won the silver medal at the 2023 Pan American Games contested in Santiago, Chile in October 2023.

== Coaching career ==
On January 25, 2025, it was announced that Orlando would serve as the baserunning coach for the Brazil national baseball team in the upcoming 2026 World Baseball Classic.

== Personal life ==
Orlando and his wife Fabricia, who have a daughter and a son, live in São Paulo all-year-round, except for part of the time when he lives in Olathe, a suburb of Kansas City, Kansas.

On March 22, 2022, Orlando became a U.S. citizen.
