= Rafael Moreno (baseball) =

Brazilian baseball player

- Pitcher
- Born: February 1, 1995 (age 31); Adamantina, São Paulo, Brazil
- Bats: Right Throws: Right
- Stats at Baseball Reference

Rafael Candido Moreno (born February 1, 1995) is a Brazilian former professional baseball pitcher. He represented Brazil at the 2013 World Baseball Classic.
