= Mike Magario =

Brazilian baseball player

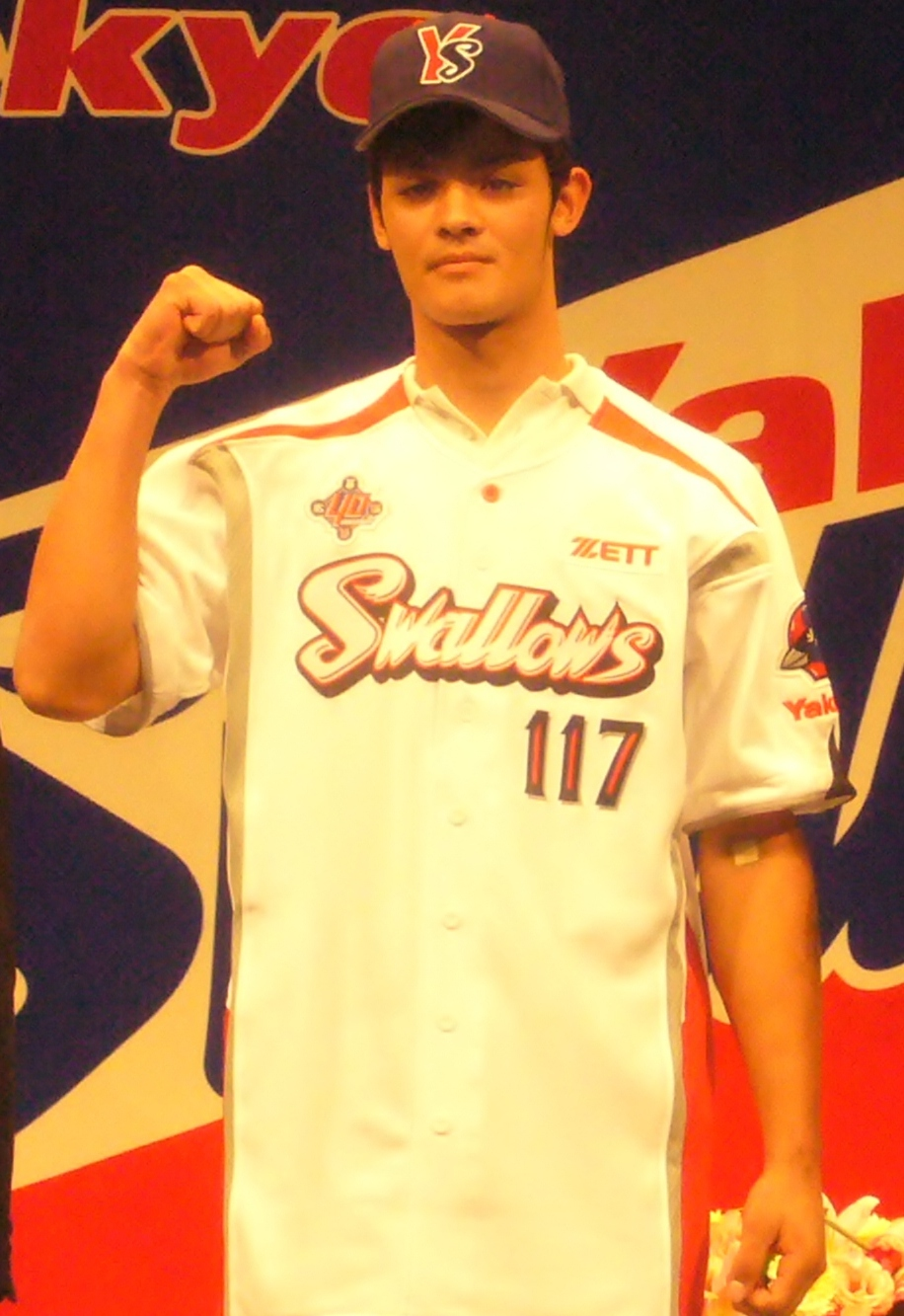
- Outfielder
- Born: November 18, 1991 (age 34); Salvador, Bahia, Brazil
- Bats: Right Throws: Right

Mike Magario (born November 18, 1991) is a Brazilian professional baseball outfielder, who is in the Tokyo Yakult Swallows organization. He attended Aomori Yamada High School and represented Brazil at 2013 World Baseball Classic.
