= Southern California Collegiate Baseball Association =

The Southern California Collegiate Baseball League is a collegiate summer baseball league, formerly the SCCBA (Association). Founded in 2007, the SCCBL is a member of the National Baseball Congress. The SCCBL League Champion represents the league annually at the National Baseball Congress World Series in Wichita, Kansas. The 2012 SCCBA champions are the Palm Springs POWER of Palm Springs, California, the most successful team to date, by defeating the East L.A. Dodgers. The Power was the Pacific Southwest Baseball League (PSWBL) champions in 2009.

The Palm Springs POWER was a member of the Palm Springs Collegiate League which currently has 6 teams for the 2019 season.

== 2019 teams (returns in 2021) ==
East Los Angeles Dodgers, Inland Empire Buccaneers in Jurupa Valley, Orange County Angels, Riverside Bulldogs, San Diego Force and So Cal Bombers in Moreno Valley.

They play games with the Cal Jays based in Imperial Valley, Canada Jays of Ontario, California, Palmdale 'Stros and So Cal Stros of Corona, California.

== History ==
=== 2017 and 2018 seasons ===
- Arroyo Seco Sentinels in Pasadena, California. (left league)
- Blythe Heat in Blythe, California. (left league)
- Diamond Valley Sabers of Hemet, California (left league)
- High Desert Haymakers of Morongo Basin, California (left league)
- Inland Valley (Azusa) Bucks of Azusa, California
- Inland Valley Pirates
- Orange County Riptide of Huntington Beach, California (now in OCCL)
- Palm Springs POWER - oldest member before leaving in 2019.
- Riverside Bulldogs in Riverside, California - as of 2017.
- San Diego Force
- Team San Diego (left league)
- SoCal Bombers of Carson, California

=== 2015 and 2016 seasons ===
Six or 7 (2016) teams played in the SCCBL, depending on how many teams lasted a season.

The Pirates were replaced by the Arroyo Seco Sentinels for the 2016 season.

The SCCBL plays games with the Orange County Collegiate League (OCCL) which consists of 6 teams.

== Seasons under the SCCBA era ==
=== 2009 and 2010 seasons ===
- California Mariners, later Newport Beach Storm (left the SCBBA).
- East L.A. Dodgers, L.A. Thrashers and Palm Springs Power.
- Orange County Pioneers of Orange, California (left the SCBBA).
- Trombly Thunder (formerly of Brea, California) (left the SCBBA).
- Tijuana Toros (del Tecate) - Chula Vista, California and Tecate, Baja California.

In the 2010 season, they admitted four collegiate teams: the Elite Kings then in El Cajon, California, the San Diego Stars, the So Cal Cardinals of Carlsbad, California and Tijuana Toros. In 2011, only the Stars and Elite Kings remained in the SCBBA.

=== 2011 season ===
- Azusa Pirates/Bucks - Azusa, California.
- East L.A. Dodgers/Eagles - El Monte, California.
- Elite Kings - Escondido, California.
- Inland Empire Aces - Ontario, California.
- L.A. Thrashers - Carson, California.
- Palm Springs Power - Palm Springs, California.
- San Diego Stars - El Cajon, California.
- So Cal Action/Athletics - Brawley, California.

In 2011, the Cardinals/Waves, Mariners/Storm, Pioneers, Yuma Bandits of the PSWL, and Team Thunder (now Team San Diego) and the Toros are in the Sou. Cal. League, a competing collegiate baseball league in the region.

In 2011, the SCCBA played games with other leagues' teams: the Orange County Waves/Wolves of Fountain Valley, California and San Diego Waves of Oceanside, California; the San Diego Force of Vista, California; the Bay Cal Yankees of Calistoga, California; and the San Francisco Seals (2011) and San Francisco Seagulls of the San Francisco Bay Area.

=== 2012 season ===
In 2012, formerly the SCCBA consisted of 9 other teams: the Palm Springs Power, the High Desert Heat (formerly of Lake Havasu City, Arizona); the L.A. Thrashers of Brea, California; the Long Beach Legends; the Orange County Hitmen of Orange, California; the Pasadena Pros; the SoCal Athletics of Irvine, California; the SoCal Bombers of Carson, California; the So Cal Sklz of Escondido, California; and the Diamond Valley Sabres of Hemet, California. In the schedule the SCBBA played with 5 non SCCBA teams - the Pomona Pride of Pomona, California; the Banning Hermits of Banning; the System 5 (Moreno Valley Yuppies) team of Moreno Valley, the Inland Empire Aces/California Dreamers of Riverside; and the El Centro Aces of El Centro, California representing the Imperial Valley.

The Western Baseball Association based in San Diego have 8 teams in 2010, 4-6 teams as of the 2011 and 4 of them in the 2012 seasons to represent an area left out by the SCBBA and Sou. Cal Leagues. They are the San Diego Stars, La Jolla Fire (in San Diego), Mira Mesa Mavericks (also in San Diego), Coronado SeaGulls, Elite Kings of El Cajon, California, Escondido Coyotes, San Marcos Knights again a non-league member team, Carlsbad/Oceanside Cougars and Oceanside Reds whom folded right before the 2012 season.

=== 2013/2014 seasons ===
The SCCBL have six teams: the High Desert Heat in Victorville, California; Inland Valley Pirates in Pomona, California; Long Beach Legends of Long Beach, California; Palm Springs Power; Riverside Rebels in Riverside, California; and Team San Diego in San Diego, California. They play some games with ten non-SCCBL teams - the Long Beach Elite; Los Angeles Brewers of Los Angeles; So Cal Catch of Carlsbad, California; So Cal Sklz of Escondido, California; Arroyo Seco Saints of Los Angeles; Bisbee Ironmen of Bisbee, Arizona; Casa Grande Cotton Kings of Casa Grande, Arizona; Orange County Cannons/Newport Beach Sharks of Newport Beach, California; Merced Black Bears of Merced, California and Tucson Nationals of Tucson, Arizona.

== Other non-league ==
San Diego has the US Armed Forces League: the Army, Navy, Air Force, Marines, Coast Guard and Border Patrol amateur baseball teams, they would play some games with SCCBA teams.
