= Pedro Okuda =

Brazilian baseball player (born 1990)

Pedro Okuda ペドロ奥田
- Shortstop
- Born: 20 April 1990 (age 36); Marilia, Brazil
- Bats: Left Throws: Right
- Stats at Baseball Reference

Pedro Okuda (born 20 April 1990 in Marilia, Brazil) is a former professional baseball shortstop. Though he was born in Brazil, Okuda attended Honjo Daiichi High School in Saitama, Japan. He played for the Brazil national baseball team at the 2013 World Baseball Classic.

== Career ==
Okuda was signed by Yasushi Yamamoto and Pat Kelly, scouts for the Seattle Mariners, on December 16, 2009.

Pedro is a player who has a lot of spirit and enthusiasm and we look forward to watching him develop in the Seattle Mariners organization.

— Mariners vice president of international operations Bob Engle on signing Pedro Okuda, MLB.com: December 16, 2009.

On December 18, 2013, Okuda was released by the Mariners.
