= Bo Takahashi =

Brazilian baseball player (born 1997)

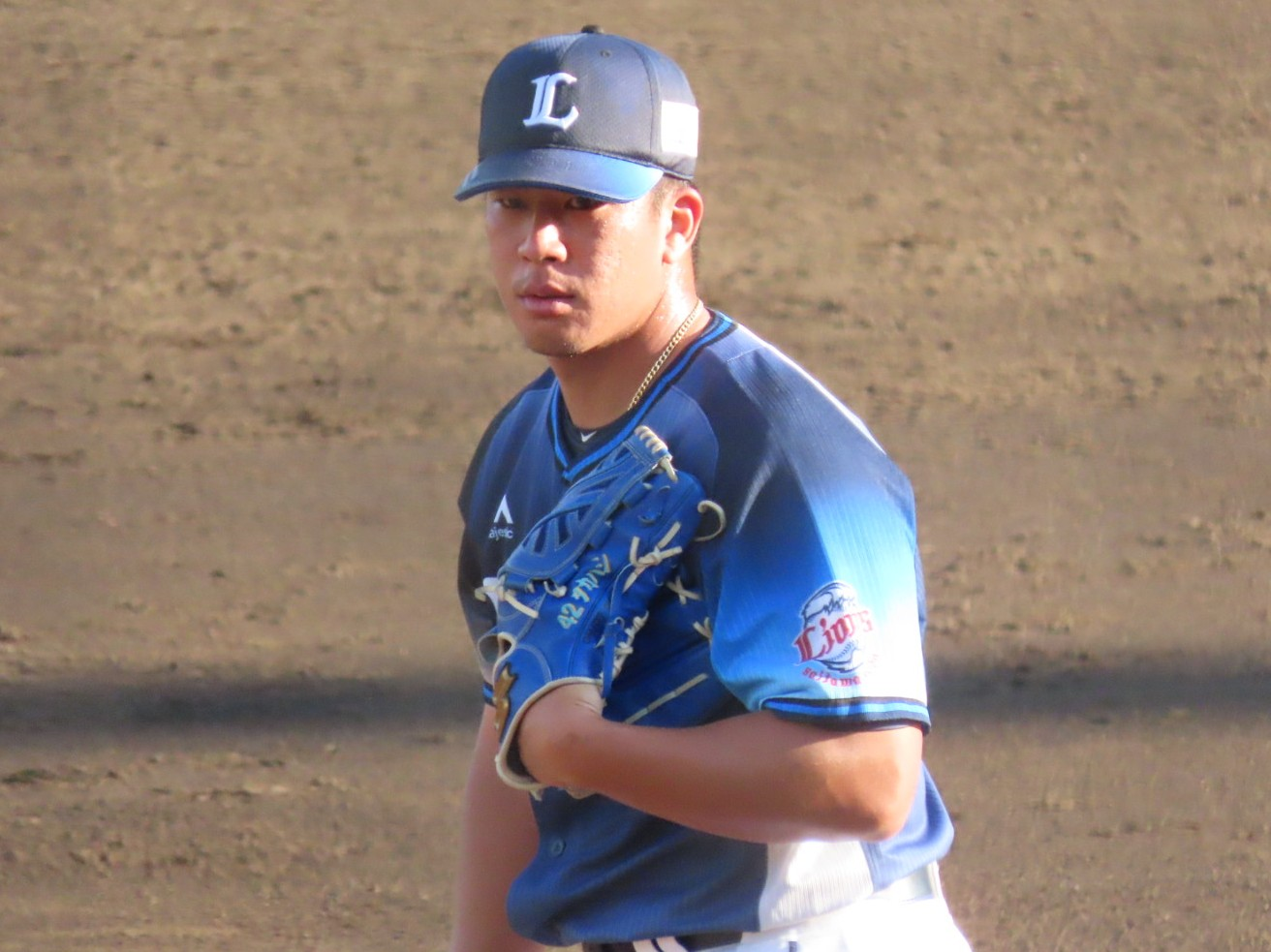
- Takahashi with the Saitama Seibu Lions in 2022

Free agent
- Pitcher
- Born: January 23, 1997 (age 29); Presidente Prudente, São Paulo, Brazil
- Bats: Right Throws: Right

Professional debut
- KBO: September 25, 2021, for the Kia Tigers
- NPB: April 2, 2022, for the Saitama Seibu Lions

KBO statistics (through 2021 season)
- Win–loss record: 1–3
- Earned run average: 4.91
- Strikeouts: 46

NPB statistics (through 2025 season)
- Win–loss record: 2-10
- Earned run average: 3.28
- Strikeouts: 105

Teams
- Kia Tigers (2021); Saitama Seibu Lions (2022–2025)

Rodrigo Hitoshi "Bo" Kaimoti Takahashi (born January 23, 1997) is a Brazilian professional baseball pitcher who is a free agent. He has previously played in the KBO League for the Kia Tigers and in Nippon Professional Baseball for the Saitama Seibu Lions.

== Career ==
=== Arizona Diamondbacks ===
Takahashi signed with the Arizona Diamondbacks as an international free agent on December 23, 2013.

He made his professional debut with the rookie-level Arizona League Diamondbacks in 2014, going 3–4 with a 4.39 ERA and 34 strikeouts in 41 innings. He played for the rookie-level Missoula Osprey in 2015, going 8–1 with a 4.66 ERA and 30 strikeouts in 77 1/3 innings. Takahashi split the 2016 season between the Low-A Hillsboro Hops, Single-A Kane County Cougars, and High-A Visalia Rawhide, combining to go 6–4 with a 2.81 ERA and 67 strikeouts over 83 1/3 innings. He split the 2017 season between Kane County and Visalia, but struggled to a 7–12 record and 5.14 ERA with 107 strikeouts over 126 innings. However, despite the overall results, Takahashi was a 2017 California League mid-season All Star. His 2018 season was split between Visalia and the Double-A Jackson Generals, for whom he accumulated a 6–6 record with a 4.03 ERA and 130 strikeouts in 120 2/3 innings pitched. Takahashi played for the Salt River Rafters of the Arizona Fall League following the 2018 season.

On November 20, 2018, the Diamondbacks added Takahashi to their 40-man roster to protect him from the Rule 5 draft. He opened the 2019 season back with Jackson. On August 18, 2019, the Diamondbacks promoted Takahashi to the major leagues for the first time. He was optioned to Jackson on August 20 without appearing in an MLB game, becoming a phantom ballplayer. Takahashi finished the 2019 season going 9–7 with a 3.72 ERA and 104 strikeouts over 118 2/3 innings for Jackson.

Takahashi did not appear for Arizona in 2020, and did not play in any games for the organization due to the cancellation of the minor league season because of the COVID-19 pandemic. On October 27, 2020, Takahashi was removed from the 40-man roster and sent outright to the Triple-A Reno Aces. He elected free agency on November 2.

=== Cincinnati Reds ===
On December 18, 2020, Takahashi signed a minor league contract with the Cincinnati Reds organization. Takahashi appeared in 18 games for the Triple-A Louisville Bats, recording a 4.45 ERA with 89 strikeouts. On August 25, 2021, Takahashi was released by the Reds.

=== Kia Tigers ===
On August 28, 2021, Takahashi signed with the Kia Tigers of the KBO League. Takahashi posted a 4.18 ERA in 6 starts for the Tigers.

=== Saitama Seibu Lions ===
On December 16, 2021, Takahashi signed with the Saitama Seibu Lions of Nippon Professional Baseball. In 27 appearances for Seibu in 2022, he recorded a 2.56 ERA with 26 strikeouts across 31 2/3 innings pitched.

In 2023, Takahashi made 28 appearances out of the bullpen for Seibu, registering a 3.00 ERA with 27 strikeouts across 36 innings of work. On November 10, 2023, the Lions re–signed Takahashi to a one–year contract with the intention to utilize him as a starting pitcher.

He was released on July 17, 2026.

== International career ==
In 2016, he played for the Brazil national baseball team in the 2017 World Baseball Classic qualification and competed again for Brazil at the 2021 World Baseball Classic qualification in Tucson, Arizona.

== Personal life ==
Takahashi is a Brazilian of Japanese descent. He is fluent in English, Portuguese, and Spanish and can understand Japanese.
