= Brazil national baseball team =

National sports team

Information
- Country: Brazil
- Federation: Confederação Brasileira de Beisebol e Softbol (CBBS)
- Confederation: WBSC Americas
- Manager: (Japan) Daniel Yuichi Matsumoto
- Captain: (Brazil) Leonardo Reginatto
- Team Colors: Blue, White, Yellow Canary

WBSC ranking
- Current: 22 ▼1 (18 November 2026)
- Highest: 15 (December 2014)
- Lowest: 25 (December 2021)

World Baseball Classic
- Appearances: 2 (first in 2013)
- Best result: 14th (2013)

World Cup
- Appearances: 3 (first in 1972)
- Best result: 7th

Intercontinental Cup
- Appearances: 2 (first in 1995)
- Best result: 5th

Pan American Games
- Appearances: 8 (first in 1951)
- Best result: (silver) 2nd (1 time, in 2023)

The Brazil national baseball team (Portuguese: Seleção Brasileira de Beisebol) is the national baseball team of Brazil. The team represents Brazil in international competitions. It is currently ranked 22nd in the world.

The Brazilian team was once nicknamed both as "Araras Azuis" (Blue Parrots) and "Os Carteiros" (The Correios Mailmans) due to the main blue and yellow uniforms, but as 2025, there is not an official nickname or a widely known nickname.

The team competed in the 2026 World Baseball Classic in March 2026.

== Results and fixtures ==
The following is a list of professional baseball game results currently active in the latest version of the WBSC World Rankings, as well as any future matches that have been scheduled.

Legend

Win Lose Void or postponed Fixture

=== 2022 ===
World Baseball Classic Q	September 30	New Zealand	7–12	Brazil	Panama City, Panama
World Baseball Classic Q	12:00 CT	LP: Ben Thompson; HR: Nikau Pouaka-Grego (1)	Boxscore	WP: Gabriel Barbosa; HR: Christian Lopes (1)	Attendance: 105; Umpires: HP: Anthony Perez. 1B: Austin Jones. 2B: Juan Manuel Rodriguez. 3B: Frantisek Pribyl.

World Baseball Classic Q	October 1	Brazil	4–1	Nicaragua	Panama City, Panama
World Baseball Classic Q	12:00 CT	WP: Felipe Sales; Sv: Enzo Sawayama (1)	Boxscore	LP: J. C. Ramírez	Attendance: 695; Umpires: HP: Dane Poncsak. 1B: Juan Manuel Rodriguez. 2B: Anthony Perez. 3B: Lisa Turbitt

World Baseball Classic Q	October 4	Brazil	0–4	Panama	Panama City, Panama
World Baseball Classic Q	19:00 CT	LP: André Rienzo	Boxscore	WP: Ariel Jurado; HR: Jose Ramos (1), Edgar Munoz (1)	Umpires: HP: Austin Jones. 1B: Anthony Perez. 2B: Juan Manuel Rodriguez. 3B: Dane Poncsak

World Baseball Classic Q	October 5	Nicaragua	3–1	Brazil	Panama City, Panama
World Baseball Classic Q	19:00 CT	WP: Osman Gutierrez; Sv: Joaquin Acuna (1)	Boxscore	LP: Heitor Tokar	Attendance: 769; Umpires: HP: Anthony Perez. 1B: Dane Poncsak. 2B: Mark Stewart. 3B: Lisa Turbitt

=== 2023 ===
Pan Am Games GS	October 19	Venezuela	1–3	Brazil	Santiago, Chile
Pan Am Games GS	15:00 UTC-3		Boxscore		Attendance: 825

Pan Am Games GS	October 22	Brazil	8–7 (F/9)	Colombia	Santiago, Chile
Pan Am Games GS	9:30 UTC-3		Boxscore		Attendance: 1,200

Pan Am Games GS	October 24	Brazil	4–2	Cuba	Santiago, Chile
Pan Am Games GS	9:30 UTC-3		Boxscore		Attendance: 765

Pan Am Games SR	October 25	Brazil	5–3	Panama	Santiago, Chile
Pan Am Games SR	15:00 UTC-3		Boxscore		Attendance: 625

Pan Am Games SR	October 27	Mexico	5–1	Brazil	Santiago, Chile
Pan Am Games SR	15:00 UTC-3		Boxscore		Attendance: 432

Pan Am Games Gold	October 28	Colombia	9–1	Brazil	Santiago, Chile
Pan Am Games Gold	15:00 UTC-3		Boxscore		Attendance: 3,180

=== 2024 ===
Copa Sudamericano GS	November 17	Argentina	2–0	Brazil	Lima, Peru
Copa Sudamericano GS	11:00 PET		Boxscore		Attendance: 150

Copa Sudamericano GS	November 18	Chile	0–10 (F/5)	Brazil	Lima, Peru
Copa Sudamericano GS	11:00 PET		Boxscore		Attendance: 120

Copa Sudamericano GS	November 19	Peru	1–11 (F/6)	Brazil	Lima, Peru
Copa Sudamericano GS	11:00 PET		Boxscore		Attendance: 250

Copa Sudamericano GS	November 20	Brazil	6–3	Ecuador	Lima, Peru
Copa Sudamericano GS	15:00 PET		Boxscore		Attendance: 75

Copa Sudamericano SF	November 21	Chile	0–10 (F/5)	Brazil	Lima, Peru
Copa Sudamericano SF	11:00 PET		Boxscore		Attendance: 50

Copa Sudamericano F	November 23	Brazil	1–2	Argentina	Lima, Peru
Copa Sudamericano F	15:00 PET		Boxscore		Attendance: 230

=== 2025 ===
World Baseball Classic Q	March 2	Brazil	0–5	Colombia	Tucson, United States
World Baseball Classic Q	18:00 MST	LP: Bo Takahashi	Boxscore	LP: Julio Teheran	Attendance: 2,332; Umpires: HP: Trevor Dannegger. 1B: Alessandro Spera. 2B: Casey James. 3B: Alan Izaguirre.

World Baseball Classic Q	March 3	Brazil	9–7	Germany	Tucson, United States
World Baseball Classic Q	11:00 MST	WP: Enzo Sawayama	Boxscore	LP: Jaden Agassi	Attendance: 2,193; Umpires: HP: Casey James. 1B: Tanner Moore. 2B: Wilfredo Montoya. 3B: Trevor Dannegger

World Baseball Classic Q	March 4	China	4–15 (F/7)	Brazil	Tucson, United States
World Baseball Classic Q	19:00 MST	LP: Xiang Wang	Boxscore	WP: Enzo Sawayama	Attendance: 3,556; Umpires: HP: Wilfredo Montoya. 1B: Harley Acosta. 2B: Tanner Moore. 3B: Trevor Dannegger

World Baseball Classic Q	March 5	Germany	4–6	Brazil	Tucson, United States
World Baseball Classic Q	18:00 MST	LP: Niklas Rimmel	Boxscore	WP: Pedro Da Costa Lemos	Attendance: 2,247; Umpires: HP: Harley Acosta.1B: Tanner Moore. 2B: Casey James. 3B: Alessandro Spera

=== 2026 ===
World Baseball Classic GS	March 6	United States	15−5	Brazil	Houston, United States
World Baseball Classic GS	19:00 CT	WP: Logan Webb; HR: Aaron Judge	Boxscore	LP: Bo Takahashi; HR: Lucas Ramirez (2), Victor Mascai	Attendance: 30,825; Umpires: Brennan Miller

World Baseball Classic GS	March 7	Brazil	0−8	Italy	Houston, United States
World Baseball Classic GS	12:00 CT	LP: Hector Villarroel	Boxscore	WP: Alek Jacob; HR: Dante Nori (2), Dominic Canzone	Attendance: 29,357; Umpires: Chun Il-soo

World Baseball Classic GS	March 8	Brazil	0−16 (F/6)	Mexico	Houston, United States
World Baseball Classic GS	19:00 CT	LP: Eric Pardinho	Boxscore	WP: Taijuan Walker; HR: Jarren Duran, Alejandro Kirk, Alek Thomas, Julián Ornelas	Attendance: 36,380; Umpires: Scott Barry

World Baseball Classic GS	March 9	Brazil	1−8	Great Britain	Houston, United States
World Baseball Classic GS	12:00 CT	LP: Tiago da Silva	Boxscore	WP: Gary Gill Hill; HR: Ian Lewis Jr.	Attendance: 34,395; Umpires: Brennan Miller

== Current roster ==
Brazil roster – 2026 World Baseball Classic
Players		Coaches
Pitchers: 22 Tiago da Silva; 31 Gabriel Barbosa; 34 Murilo Gouvea; 66 Hugo Kanabushi; 35 Tomas Lopez; 0 Joao Gabriel Marostica; 41 Oscar Nakaoshi; 21 Joseph Contreras; 43 Eric Pardinho; 18 Enzo Sawayama; 19 Daniel Missaki; 40 Vitor Takahashi; 49 Thyago Vieira; 4 Hector Villarroel	Catchers: 28 Gabriel Gomes; 13 Matheus Silva; 20 Enzo Hayashida; 7 Gabriel Carmo; Infielders: 77 Dante Bichette Jr.; 1 Vitor Ito; 39 Felipe Mizukosi; 12 Tiago Nishiyama; 5 Leonardo Reginatto; 15 Lucas Rojo; 2 Felipe Koragi; Outfielders: 3 Gabriel Maciel; 17 Victor Mascai; 24 Lucas Ramirez; 6 Osvaldo Carvalho	Manager: 82 Yuichi Matsumoto; Coaches: 23 Thiago Caldeira (Bench); 36 Reinaldo Sato (Hitting); 25 André Rienzo (Pitching); 74 Kléber Ojima (Bullpen); 16 Paulo Orlando (Baserunning)

== Tournament results ==
=== World Baseball Classic ===
World Baseball Classic record							Qualification record			
Year	Round	Position	W	L	RS	RA	W	L	RS	RA
2006	did not enter						No qualifiers held			
2009	did not enter						No qualifiers held			
(Japan) 2013	Round 1	14th	0	3	7	15	3	0	11	3
2017	did not qualify						1	2	13	5
2023	did not qualify						2	2	17	15
(United States) 2026	Round 1	20th	0	4	6	47	3	1	27	18
Total	Round 1	2/6	0	7	13	62	9	5	68	41

Brazil World Baseball Classic Record by Opponent
Opponent	Tournaments met	W-L record	Largest victory		Largest defeat		Current streak
Opponent	Tournaments met	W-L record	Score	Tournament	Score	Tournament	Current streak
China	1	0-1	–		5–2	Japan 2013	L1
Cuba	1	0-1	–		5–2	Japan 2013	L1
Great Britain	1	0-1	–		8–1	United States 2026	L1
Italy	1	0-1	–		8–0	United States 2026	L1
Japan	1	0-1	–		5–3	Japan 2013	L1
Mexico	1	0-1	–		16–0 (F/6)	United States 2026	L1
United States	1	0-1	–		15–5	United States 2026	L1
Overall	2	0–7	-		Against MEX		L7
Overall	2	0–7	-		16–0 (F/6)	United States 2026	L7

Brazil WBC Qualification Record by Opponent
Opponent	Tournaments met	W-L record	Largest victory		Largest defeat		Current streak
Opponent	Tournaments met	W-L record	Score	Tournament	Score	Tournament	Current streak
China	1	1-0	12–2 (F/7)	United States 2026	–		W1
Colombia	2	1-1	7–1	Panama 2013	5–0	United States 2026	L1
Germany	1	2-0	9–7	United States 2026	–		W2
Great Britain	1	0-1	–		4–3	United States 2017	L1
Israel	1	0-1	–		1–0	United States 2017	L1
New Zealand	1	1-0	12–7	Panama 2023	–		W1
Nicaragua	1	1-1	4–1	Panama 2023	3–1	Panama 2023	L1
Pakistan	1	1-0	10–0 (F/7)	United States 2017	–		W1
Panama	2	2-1	3–2	Panama 2013	4–0	Panama 2023	L1
Overall	4	9–5	Against CHN		Against COL		W3
Overall	4	9–5	12–2 (F/7)	United States 2026	5–0	United States 2026	W3

=== Baseball World Cup ===
- 2003: 7th
- 2005: 14th

=== Intercontinental Cup ===
- 1995: 5th
- 2002: 9th

=== Pan American Games ===
- 2007: 7th
- 2023: 2nd

== Team history ==
The Brazil National Baseball team is controlled by the Confederação Brasileira de Beisebol e Softbol. The team represents the nation of Brazil in senior-level men's international competition and is a member of the COPABE or WBSC Americas. Though not a major competitor in the world scene, Brazil has steadily been improving and managed to provide a scare for both the Cuba national baseball team and the United States national baseball team in the first decade of the 21st century. Due to the popularity of the sport among the Japanese, the Brazilian team was for longer parts of history, composed in large part of Japanese-Brazilian players. But recently, its more diverse, having non-Asian players such as Paulo Orlando, Leonardo Reginatto and Yan Gomes and descendants of Brazilians such as the Bichette Brothers (Bo and Dante Jr.), and Lucas Ramirez (son of Manny Ramirez).

== Baseball World Cup History ==
=== 2003 ===
In 2003, Brazil placed 7th in the Baseball World Cup. The field of teams consisted of 15 teams split into two groups. Group A included Cuba, Nicaragua, Chinese Taipaei, South Korea, Canada, Italy and Russia while group B consisted of Japan, team USA, Panama, Brazil, the Netherlands, Mexico, China and France.

Group B:
Japan
USA
Panama
Brazil
Netherlands
Mexico
China
France

The order the teams are listed in above shows the teams success in the first round of the tournament. The four teams from each group who finished the first round with the best records went on to play in the placing rounds, which began with the quarterfinals. Brazil played their quarterfinal against the eventual tournament Champions, the Cuba national baseball team and nearly pulled off a huge upset. Pitcher Kléber Ojima nursed a 3–2 lead into the ninth inning, but Cuba's offense proved too powerful for the underdogs to hang on. After a deep triple and a two-run game-winning home run, the Brazilian team are crushed and stunned at their 4–3 loss. In their next game the team suffered a lopsided defeat to the United States 14–3, a game in which they were forced to use 5 different pitchers. This defeat sent Brazil into the Seventh place game where they faced and beat the South Korea national baseball team by the score of 8–3, taking advantage of pitcher Cláudio Yamadao throws eight scoreless innings and Brazil officially finishing out their first ever appearance in the Baseball world cup with a win.

=== 2005 ===
In 2005 Brazil competed in their second Baseball World Cup, where they were managed by Mitsuyoshi Sato. Coming off a Seventh place finish in 2003, the team was hungry for more success. The first game of pool play had Brazil taking on China. A hard-fought game by both teams ended in the 15th inning when China scored twice to beat Brazil 6–5. Brazil had a 3-run lead going into the seventh inning of the contest. Next up for Brazil were the South Africa national baseball team. Behind a strong pitching performance and sturdy defensive play, the Brazilian team one-hit South Africa and improved to 1–1. The success did not last however, as the team faced a powerful team Cuba in their next game. The final score was 11–1 in Cuba's favor and Brazil was left sitting at 1–2. The woes continued to pile up for Brazil as they lost the following three games 7–0 to the Netherlands, 4–0 to South Korea and 8–5 over Panama. In the latter game of the skid Brazil actually found itself in the lead with just four innings to play. However the bats for the Panama national baseball team came alive and they rallied for the victory. Brazil finally was able to find its stroke against an unsuspecting Sweden team and took and 11–4 victory while scoring all of their runs in each of the first three innings. The victory gave Brazil a record of 2–4 in the games and a hope to finish with a win and boost their winning percentage. Alas, Brazil would taste no more victory as they dropped their final game 12–4 to Canada, a game in which they led 3–0 early on. Their 15th-place finish in 2005 was the last time the team competed in the Baseball World Cup.

== Intercontinental Cup History ==
=== 1995 ===
In 1995 Brazil competed in the Intercontinental Cup for the first time. The team took 5th place that year, as the dynasty that is Cuban baseball rolled to their seventh consecutive title. Japan would take second place while the Nicaragua national baseball team was left holding the bronze.

=== 2002 ===
2002 was Brazil's second shot at Intercontinental Cup glory. However, Cuba ended their drought of Golds with yet another first-place finish, one of their ten in Cup history. South Korea took the silver while the Dominican Republic national baseball team hoisted the bronze. Brazil was left with a seventh-place finish and hasn't competed in the tournament since.

== Pan American Games History ==
=== 2007 ===
In 2007 Brazil competed in its very first Pan American Games for baseball. The team opened up pool play with an impressive 1–0 win over Nicaragua. Pitchers Claudio Yamada and Kléber Ojima combined for the four hit shutout while the lone run was scored on a home run by Tiago Magalhaes. Brazil had put themselves in the drivers seat with a huge game 1 win, but took a step back with a 14–2 spanking handed to them by the Dominican Republic national baseball team. This loss put the team's record at 1–1 and meant that the next and final game of pool play was make it or break it for Brazil. In the matchup between Brazil and a powerful United States team, Things were extremely close for the majority of the game. Brazil took an early one-run lead in the first inning but saw it quickly taken away in the second as the U.S. pulled even. The game would stay deadlocked until the fifth when the U.S. would gain a one-run advantage, and later in the seventh would tack on what proved to be a decisive five runs. Despite late efforts by Brazil, who came up with two runs in the eighth and one in the ninth, the American team shut the door for the win and finished pool play undefeated on the 7–5 victory. This loss dropped Brazil to 1–2, a record which proved not good enough to make advance to the medal rounds. The United States would end up making it all the way to the championship where they were beaten by Cuba 3–1.

=== 2023 ===
The Brazilian team surprised the baseball world. They start beating Venezuela 3–1, Cuba 4–2, and Colombia on a hard match, 8–7, in the first phase and qualifying for the SuperRound. On this phase beating Panama 5–3, but losing to Mexico 5–1, Brazil could make it through the finals for the first time. Facing Colombia again they were beaten 9–1, thus winning the silver medal. The first medal in Pan American Games of the team's history.

== World Baseball Classic History ==
Brazil has participated twice of the WBC, in 2013 and 2026, after having to pass under qualifier stages on both times

Brazil also competed on the qualifiers of 2017 and 2023 qualifiers, although without success in these.

=== 2013 roster ===
2013 Brazil Baseball Team roster
Players		Coaches
Pitchers: 21 Gabriel Asakura; 27 Rafael Fernandes; -- Luiz Gohara; 34 Murilo Gouvea; 24 Hugo Kanabushi; 19 Kesley Kondo; 18 Rafael Moreno; 13 Oscar Nakaoshi; 25 Andre Rienzo; -- Jean Tome; 32 Thyago Vieira; 28 Ernesto Noris	Catchers: 26 Bruno Hirata; Infielders: 4 Felipe Burin; 33 Alan Fanhoni; 37 Iago Januario; 34 Daniel Matsumoto; 17 Pedro Okuda; 20 Leonardo Reginatto; 1 Lucas Rojo; 36 Reinaldo Sato; 6 Marcio Tanaka; Outfielders: 30 Tiago Magalhaes; 9 Mike Magario; 29 JC Muñiz; 16 Paulo Orlando	Manager: - Barry Larkin; Coaches: -- Tiago Caldeira; -- Marcos Guimaraes; -- Go Kuroki; -- Ricardo Matumaru; -- Mitsuyoshi Sato; -- Satiro Watanabe

Preliminary roster for 2013 World Baseball Classic.

Manager: Barry Larkin
Coaches: Tiago Caldeira, Marcos Guimaraes, Go Kuroki, Ricardo Matumaru, Mitsuyoshi Sato, Satiro Watanabe.

Pos.	No.	Player	Date of birth (age)	Bats	Throws	Club
P	21	Gabriel Asakura	November 11, 1988			Cal State Golden Eagles
P	27	Rafael Fernandes	April 23, 1986			Tokyo Yakult Swallows
P	--	Luiz Gohara	July 31, 1996			Pulaski Mariners
P	34	Murilo Gouvea	October 15, 1988			Lexington Legends
P	24	Hugo Kanabushi	May 22, 1989			Tokyo Yakult Swallows (minor league)
P	19	Kesley Kondo	December 1, 1989			Utah Utes
P	18	Rafael Moreno	February 11, 1995			DSL Orioles
P	13	Oscar Nakaoshi	May 28, 1991			Hakuoh University
P	25	Andre Rienzo	July 5, 1988			Chicago White Sox
P	--	Jean Tome	September 5, 1989			Mie Nishi
P	32	Thyago Vieira	January 7, 1993			Everett AquaSox
P	15	Carlos Yoshimura	February 22, 1984			Yamaha
C	26	Bruno Hirata	March 17, 1988			Toshiba
IF	4	Felipe Burin	February 10, 1992			Pulaski Mariners
IF	33	Alan Fanhoni	December 23, 1991			NTT East
IF	37	Iago Januario	January 20, 1993			VSL Rays
IF	34	Daniel Matsumoto	December 18, 1980			Tokyo Yakult Swallows
P	28	Ernesto Noris	November 24, 1972			Atibaia
IF	17	Pedro Okuda	April 20, 1990			VSL Mariners
IF	20	Leonardo Reginatto	April 10, 1990			Bowling Green Hot Rods
IF	1	Lucas Rojo	April 5, 1994			VSL Phillies
IF	36	Reinaldo Sato	October 25, 1980			Yamaha
IF	6	Marcio Tanaka	June 9, 1980			JR Kyushu
OF	30	Tiago Magalhaes	May 18, 1981			Yamaha
OF	9	Mike Magario	November 18, 1991			Tokyo Yakult Swallows (minor league)
OF	29	JC Muñiz	June 28, 1976			Marília
OF	16	Paulo Orlando	November 1, 1985			Kansas City Royals

== 2017 World Baseball Classic ==
=== 2017 roster ===
Brazil roster – 2017 World Baseball Classic Qualification
Players		Coaches
Pitchers: 17 Edilson Batista; 27 Rafael Fernandes; 14 Felipe Fukuda; 34 Murilo Gouvea; 41 Hugo Kanabushi; 3 Claudio Matumuto; 28 Ernesto Noris; 13 Leonardo Oliveira; 43 Eric Pardinho; 25 André Rienzo; 1 Felipe Sales; 18 Bo Takahashi; 35 Jean Tome; 47 Thyago Vieira	Catchers: 9 Luis Camargo; 46 Angel Luis Cobas; 15 Luis Paz; Infielders: 5 Bo Bichette; 19 Dante Bichette, Jr.; 10 Carlos Garmendia; 6 Vitor Ito; 20 Leonardo Reginatto; 4 Lucas Rojo; 36 Reinaldo Sato; Outfielders: 22 Irait Chirino; 7 Fernando Luciano; 37 Gabriel Maciel; 29 J. C. Muñiz	Manager: Barry Larkin

=== 2017 Qualifying results ===
Preliminaries
–	Pakistan	0
–	Brazil	10
–	Great Britain	2
–	Israel	5
Lower round 1
L1	Pakistan	0
L2	Great Britain	14

Semifinals
W1	Brazil	0
W2	Israel	1
Lower final
W4	Great Britain	4
L3	Brazil	3

Qualifier
W3	Israel	9
W5	Great Britain	1

Date	Local time	Road team	Score	Home team	Inn.	Venue	Game duration	Attendance	Boxscore
Sep 22, 2016	12:00	Pakistan	0–10	Brazil		MCU Park	2:40	1,210	
Sep 22, 2016	7:00	Brazil	0–1	Israel		MCU Park	2:56	1,862	
Sep 24, 2016	8:00	Great Britain	4–3	Brazil		MCU Park		1,480	

== 2023 World Baseball Classic ==
=== 2023 Roster ===
Brazil roster – 2023 World Baseball Classic Qualifier
Players		Coaches
Pitchers: 37 Marcelo Arai; 31 Gabriel Barbosa; 19 Edilson Batista; 42 Igor Januario; 41 Igor Kimura; 39 Oscar Nakaoshi; 15 Christian Pedrol; 47 Sulivan Ribeiro; 25 Andre Rienzo; 22 Felipe Sales; 34 Enzo Sawayama; 43 Douglas Takano; 98 Heitor Tokar; 58 Hector Villarroel	Catchers: 13 Eddy Arteaga; 27 Marcio Kikuchi; 6 Daniel Molinari; Infielders: 4 Damian Goulart; 3 Christian Lopes; 10 Tim Lopes; 1 Vitor Ito; 17 Victor Mascai; 5 Leonardo Reginatto; 7 Lucas Rojo; Outfielders: 81 Daniel Chibana; 55 Luciano Fernando; 9 Gabriel Maciel; 16 Paulo Orlando	Manager: - Steve Finley; Coaches: -- Luis Alicea; -- Jose Thiago Calderia; -- Marcos Guimaraes; -- LaTroy Hawkins

=== 2023 Qualifying results ===
Opening Round
–	New Zealand	7
–	Brazil	12
–	Pakistan	4
–	Argentina	7
Lower round 1
L2	Pakistan	0
L3	Nicaragua	12
L1	New Zealand	1
L4	Argentina	4

Semifinals
–	Nicaragua	1
W1	Brazil	4
–	Panama	11
W2	Argentina	0
Lower round 2
W5	Nicaragua	6
W6	Argentina	5

Qualifier
W3	Brazil	0
W4	Panama	4
Lower final
L8	Brazil	1
W7	Nicaragua	3

Date	Local time	Road team	Score	Home team	Inn.	Venue	Game duration	Attendance	Boxscore
Sept. 30, 2022	12:00	New Zealand	7–12	Brazil		Estadio Nacional de Panamá	3:17	105	Boxscore
Oct. 1, 2022	12:00	Brazil	4–1	Nicaragua		Estadio Nacional de Panamá	3:48	695	Boxscore
Oct. 4, 2022	20:00	Brazil	0–4	Panama*		Estadio Nacional de Panamá	3:09	6,789	Boxscore
Oct. 5, 2022	19:00	Nicaragua	3–1	Brazil		Estadio Nacional de Panamá	3:21	769	Boxscore

=== 2026 Qualifying results ===
Date	Local time	Road team	Score	Home team	Inn.	Venue	Game duration	Attendance	Boxscore
March 2, 2025	18:00	Brazil	0–5	Colombia		Veterans Memorial Stadium	2:23	2,332	Boxscore
March 3, 2025	11:00	Brazil	9–7	Germany		Veterans Memorial Stadium	3:05	2,193	Boxscore
March 4, 2025	11:00	China	2–12	Brazil	7	Veterans Memorial Stadium	2:30	3,566	Boxscore
March 6, 2025	18:00	Germany	4–6	Brazil		Veterans Memorial Stadium	2:23	2,247	Boxscore
