= 2019 Pan American Games Qualifier =

Tournament details
- Country: Brazil
- Cities: Ibiúna; São Paulo
- Venues: 2 (in 2 host cities)
- Dates: January 29 – February 3
- Teams: 7

Final positions
- Champions: Dominican Republic
- Runners-up: Colombia
- Third place: Nicaragua
- Fourth place: Canada

The 2019 Pan American Games Qualifier is a baseball tournament that was held between January 29 and February 3, 2019, in Ibiúna and São Paulo, Brazil. The tournament qualified the last four teams to the Baseball at the 2019 Pan American Games tournament in Lima, Peru.

Four teams qualified for the 2019 Pan American Games: Canada, Colombia, Dominican Republic and Nicaragua.

== Qualification ==
Canada and the USA qualified automatically along with the hosts Brazil, and five teams not qualifying for the 2019 Pan American Games, from the Baseball at the 2018 Central American and Caribbean Games also qualifying. The United States withdrew, meaning the Dominican Republic as the next best ranked team from the Central American and Caribbean Games replaced them. It was announced on 21 January 2019, that the Venezuelan team withdrew due to financial concerns. The team will not be replaced.

== Venues ==
Two venues were used, one each in Ibiúna and São Paulo.

== Rosters ==
- Brazil
- Canada
- Colombia
- Dominican Republic
- Mexico
- Nicaragua
- Panama

== Group stage ==
=== Group A ===
Qualified for Round 2
Eliminated

Team	G	W	L	RS	RA	RD
Dominican Republic	3	2	1	15	8	+7
Nicaragua	3	2	1	21	16	+5
Mexico	3	2	1	20	17	+3
Brazil	3	0	3	7	22	−15

30 January 2019; 10:00	Nicaragua	12–4	Mexico	Municipal Stadium Baseball Mie Nishi, São Paulo

30 January 2019; 14:30	Brazil	2–3	Dominican Republic	Municipal Stadium Baseball Mie Nishi, São Paulo

31 January 2019; 10:00	Dominican Republic	10–3	Nicaragua	Municipal Stadium Baseball Mie Nishi, São Paulo

31 January 2019; 14:30	Mexico	13–3	Brazil	Municipal Stadium Baseball Mie Nishi, São Paulo

1 February 2019; 10:00	Mexico	3–2	Dominican Republic	Municipal Stadium Baseball Mie Nishi, São Paulo

1 February 2019; 14:30	Nicaragua	6–2	Brazil	Municipal Stadium Baseball Mie Nishi, São Paulo

- Matches held on 1 February were moved to that day after the Dominican Republic had travel difficulties and the other game was washed out.

=== Group B ===
Team	G	W	L	RS	RA	RD
Colombia	2	2	0	18	10	+8
Canada	2	1	1	11	9	+2
Panama	2	0	2	5	15	−10

29 January 2019; 15:00	Panama	1–5	Canada	CBBS Academy, Ibiúna

30 January 2019; 15:00	Panama	4–10	Colombia	CBBS Academy, Ibiúna

1 February 2019; 11:00	Colombia	8–6	Canada	CBBS Academy, Ibiúna

== Knockout round ==
Semifinals
February 2 — São Paulo
Dominican Republic	10
Canada	7
February 2 — São Paulo
Colombia	5
Nicaragua	4

Gold
February 3 — São Paulo
Dominican Republic	17
Colombia	4
Bronze
February 3 — São Paulo
Canada	12
Nicaragua	14

=== Semifinals ===
2 February 2019	Dominican Republic	10–7	Canada	CBBS Academy, Ibiúna

2 February 2019	Colombia	5–4	Nicaragua	CBBS Academy, Ibiúna

=== Bronze-medal match ===
3 February 2019	Canada	12–14	Nicaragua (bronze)	CBBS Academy, Ibiúna

=== Gold-medal match ===
3 February 2019	(gold) Dominican Republic	17–4	Colombia (silver)	CBBS Academy, Ibiúna

== Final standings ==
Qualified for Lima 2019

Rank	Team
1st place, gold medalist(s)	Dominican Republic
2nd place, silver medalist(s)	Colombia
3rd place, bronze medalist(s)	Nicaragua
4	Canada
5	Mexico
6	Panama
7	Brazil
