= 2009 World Baseball Classic rosters =

2009 World Baseball Classic

The following is a list of squads for each nation competing at the 2009 World Baseball Classic. The tournament started on March 5, 2009.

Each participating national federation had a deadline of January 19, 2009 to submit a 45-man provisional roster. Final rosters of 28 players, which also must include a minimum of 13 pitchers and two catchers, were submitted on February 24. If a player on the submitted roster is unable to play, usually due to injury, he can be substituted at any time before the start of the tournament. Roster changes during the competition are restricted to the breaks between rounds of competition—for example, a player who is injured during pool play could not be replaced during the pool phase, but could be replaced if his team advanced to the second round.

Team affiliations on all rosters, and player ages, are current as of the opening day of the tournament.

== Pool A ==
=== China ===
Manager: 77 (United States) Terry Collins
Coaches: 66 (United States) Brent Strom, 72 Aiping Wang, 29 Sheng Yi

| Pos. | No. | Player | Date of birth (age) | Bats | Throws | Club |
|---|---|---|---|---|---|---|
| P | 15 | Bu Tao (卜涛) | January 15, 1983 (age 26) | | | (China) Sichuan Dragons |
| P | 3 | Chen Junyi (陈俊毅) | August 26, 1981 (age 27) | | | (China) Guangdong Leopards |
| P | 33 | Chen Kun (陈坤) | March 5, 1980 (age 29) | | | (China) Sichuan Dragons |
| P | 42 | Chen Wei (陈玮) | June 11, 1983 (age 25) | | | (China) Tianjin Lions |
| P | 51 | Li Chenhao (李晨浩) | July 2, 1977 (age 31) | | | (China) Beijing Tigers |
| P | 60 | Li Weiliang (李韦良) | September 2, 1980 (age 28) | | | (China) Beijing Tigers |
| P | 11 | Liu Kai (刘凯) | October 11, 1987 (age 21) | | | (United States) New York Yankees |
| P | 17 | Lu Jiangang (吕建刚) | February 19, 1979 (age 30) | | | (China) Tianjin Lions |
| P | 28 | Sun Guoqiang (孙国强) | May 30, 1971 (age 37) | | | (China) Jiangsu Hopestar |
| P | 20 | Xia Kangnan (夏康男) | July 13, 1988 (age 20) | | | (China) Shanghai Eagles |
| P | 27 | Zhang Li (张力) | February 3, 1980 (age 29) | | | (China) Shanghai Eagles |
| P | 62 | Zhu Dawei (朱大卫) | July 25, 1988 (age 20) | | | (Japan) Saitama Seibu Lions |
| C | 19 | Dong Chunhua (董春华) | August 4, 1990 (age 18) | | | (China) Shanghai Eagles |
| C | 2 | Yang Yang (杨洋) | May 19, 1986 (age 22) | | | (China) Beijing Tigers |
| C | 8 | Zhang Zhenwang (张振旺) | March 1, 1988 (age 21) | | | (United States) New York Yankees |
| IF | 21 | Ray Chang (张宝树) | August 24, 1983 (age 25) | | | (United States) Pittsburgh Pirates |
| IF | 30 | Chu Fujia (褚夫佳) | September 10, 1989 (age 19) | | | (China) Jiangsu Hopestar |
| IF | 16 | Hou Fenglian(侯凤连) | July 11, 1980 (age 28) | | | (China) Tianjin Lions |
| IF | 31 | Jia Delong(贾徳龙) | July 4, 1985 (age 23) | | | (China) Guangdong Leopards |
| IF | 10 | Liu Guangbiao (刘广标) | September 5, 1978 (age 30) | | | (China) Guangdong Leopards |
| IF | 55 | Wang Jingchao (王靖超) | July 13, 1988 (age 20) | | | (China) Tianjin Lions |
| IF | 65 | Zhang Fujia (张伏佳) | August 15, 1982 (age 26) | | | (China) Sichuan Dragons |
| IF | 7 | Zhang Xiaotian (张小天) | August 26, 1988 (age 20) | | | (China) Jiangsu Hopestar |
| IF | 9 | Zhang Yufeng (张玉峰) | February 9, 1977 (age 32) | | | (China) Shanghai Eagles |
| OF | 5 | Chen Hao (陈浩) | February 21, 1990 (age 19) | | | (China) Jiangsu Hopestar |
| OF | 88 | Feng Fei (冯飞) | February 18, 1983 (age 26) | | | (China) Sichuan Dragons |
| OF | 1 | Sun Lingfeng (孙岭峰) | August 14, 1978 (age 30) | | | (China) Beijing Tigers |
| OF | 25 | Wang Chao (王超) | March 23, 1985 (age 23) | | | (China) Tianjin Lions |

=== Chinese Taipei ===
Manager: 3 Chih-Hsien Yeh (葉志仙)
Coaches: 88 Tai-Yuan Kuo (郭泰源), 26 Kong-Hui Wang (王光輝), 70 Wen-Sheng Lu (呂文生), 6 Chen Wei-Cheng (陳威成), 65 Lin Kun-Han (林琨瀚), 68 Cheng-Hao Wang (王宸浩)

| Pos. | No. | Player | Date of birth (age) | Bats | Throws | Club |
|---|---|---|---|---|---|---|
| P | 99 | Hung-Wen Chen (陳鴻文) | February 3, 1986 (age 23) | | | (United States) Chicago Cubs |
| P | 51 | Chi-Hung Cheng (鄭錡鴻) | June 20, 1985 (age 23) | | | (United States) Pittsburgh Pirates |
| P | 20 | Kai-Wen Cheng (鄭凱文) | July 26, 1988 (age 20) | | | (Japan) Hanshin Tigers |
| P | 90 | Po-Hsuan Keng (耿伯軒) | October 15, 1984 (age 24) | | | (Taiwan) La New Bears |
| P | 12 | Cheng-Chang Lee (李振昌) | October 21, 1986 (age 22) | | | (United States) Cleveland Indians |
| P | 47 | Yu-Cheng Liao (廖于誠) | September 4, 1980 (age 28) | | | (Taiwan) Brother Elephants |
| P | 98 | Ko-Chien Lin (林克謙) | May 5, 1986 (age 22) | | | (Taiwan) Sinon Bulls |
| P | 81 | Po-Yu Lin (林柏佑) | September 16, 1986 (age 22) | | | National Taiwan Sport University |
| P | 11 | Yueh-Ping Lin (林岳平) | January 28, 1982 (age 27) | | | (Taiwan) Uni-President 7-Eleven Lions |
| P | 48 | Chia-Jen Lo (羅嘉仁) | April 7, 1986 (age 22) | | | (United States) Houston Astros |
| P | 21 | Fu-Te Ni (倪福德) | November 14, 1982 (age 26) | | | (United States) Detroit Tigers |
| P | 62 | Chia-Chun Tang (唐嘉駿) | December 21, 1984 (age 24) | | | Taiwan Cooperative Bank |
| P | 42 | Sung-Wei Tseng (增菘瑋) | December 28, 1984 (age 24) | | | (United States) Cleveland Indians |
| C | 34 | Chih-Kang Kao (高志綱) | February 27, 1981 (age 28) | | | (Taiwan) Uni-President 7-Eleven Lions |
| C | 36 | Yi-Feng Kuo (郭一峰) | March 24, 1976 (age 32) | | | (Taiwan) Brother Elephants |
| C | 15 | Kun-Sheng Lin (林琨笙) | March 8, 1987 (age 21) | | | National Taiwan Sport University |
| IF | 25 | Chih-Hsien Chiang (蔣智賢) | February 21, 1988 (age 21) | | | (United States) Boston Red Sox |
| IF | 4 | Kuo-Ching Kao (高國慶) | October 6, 1978 (age 30) | | | (Taiwan) Uni-President 7-Eleven Lions |
| IF | 7 | Yen-Wen Kuo (郭嚴文) | October 25, 1988 (age 20) | | | (United States) Cincinnati Reds |
| IF | 10 | Han Lin (林瀚) | January 24, 1985 (age 24) | | | (Taiwan) Uni-President 7-Eleven Lions |
| IF | 22 | Yi-Chuan Lin (林益全) | November 11, 1985 (age 23) | | | Taiwan Power Company |
| IF | 23 | Cheng-Min Peng (彭政閔) | August 6, 1978 (age 30) | | | (Taiwan) Brother Elephants |
| IF | 14 | Sheng-Wei Wang (王勝偉) | April 1, 1984 (age 24) | | | (Taiwan) Brother Elephants |
| OF | 8 | Chih-Yao Chan (詹智堯) | January 2, 1983 (age 26) | | | (Taiwan) La New Bears |
| OF | 24 | Dai-Chi Kuo (郭岱琦) | October 16, 1981 (age 27) | | | (Taiwan) Uni-President 7-Eleven Lions |
| OF | 44 | Che-Hsuan Lin (林哲瑄) | September 21, 1988 (age 20) | | | (United States) Boston Red Sox |
| OF | 31 | Wei-Chu Lin (林威助) | January 22, 1979 (age 30) | | | (Japan) Hanshin Tigers |
| OF | 55 | Wu-Hsiung Pan (潘武雄) | March 11, 1981 (age 27) | | | (Taiwan) Uni-President 7-Eleven Lions |

=== Japan ===
Manager: 83 Tatsunori Hara (原辰徳)
Coaches: 73 Koichi Ogata, 72 Tsutomu Itō, 71 Hisashi Yamada, 92 Tsuyoshi Yoda, 81 Kazunori Shinozuka, 63 Nobuhiro Takashiro

| Pos. | No. | Player | Date of birth (age) | Bats | Throws | Club |
|---|---|---|---|---|---|---|
| P | 11 | Yu Darvish (ダルビッシュ 有) | August 16, 1986 (aged 22) | | | (Japan) Hokkaido Nippon-Ham Fighters |
| P | 22 | Kyuji Fujikawa (藤川 球児) | July 21, 1980 (aged 28) | | | (Japan) Hanshin Tigers |
| P | 20 | Hisashi Iwakuma (岩隈 久志) | April 12, 1981 (aged 27) | | | (Japan) Tohoku Rakuten Golden Eagles |
| P | 19 | Minoru Iwata (岩田 稔) | October 31, 1983 (aged 25) | | | (Japan) Hanshin Tigers |
| P | 28 | Satoshi Komatsu (小松 聖) | October 29, 1981 (aged 27) | | | (Japan) Orix Buffaloes |
| P | 14 | Takahiro Mahara (馬原 孝浩) | December 8, 1981 (aged 27) | | | (Japan) Fukuoka SoftBank Hawks |
| P | 18 | Daisuke Matsuzaka (松坂 大輔) | September 13, 1980 (aged 28) | | | (United States) Boston Red Sox |
| P | 47 | Toshiya Sugiuchi (杉内 俊哉) | October 30, 1980 (aged 28) | | | (Japan) Fukuoka SoftBank Hawks |
| P | 15 | Masahiro Tanaka (田中 将大) | November 1, 1988 (aged 20) | | | (Japan) Tohoku Rakuten Golden Eagles |
| P | 26 | Tetsuya Utsumi (内海 哲也) | April 29, 1982 (aged 26) | | | (Japan) Yomiuri Giants |
| P | 16 | Hideaki Wakui (涌井 秀章) | June 21, 1986 (aged 22) | | | (Japan) Saitama Seibu Lions |
| P | 31 | Shunsuke Watanabe (渡辺 俊介) | August 27, 1976 (aged 32) | | | (Japan) Chiba Lotte Marines |
| P | 39 | Tetsuya Yamaguchi (山口 鉄也) | November 11, 1983 (aged 25) | | | (Japan) Yomiuri Giants |
| C | 10 | Shinnosuke Abe (阿部 慎之助) | March 20, 1979 (aged 29) | | | (Japan) Yomiuri Giants |
| C | 29 | Yoshiyuki Ishihara (石原 慶幸) | September 7, 1979 (aged 29) | | | (Japan) Hiroshima Toyo Carp |
| C | 2 | Kenji Johjima (城島 健司) | June 8, 1976 (aged 32) | | | (United States) Seattle Mariners |
| IF | 8 | Akinori Iwamura (岩村 明憲) | February 9, 1979 (aged 30) | | | (United States) Tampa Bay Rays |
| IF | 7 | Yasuyuki Kataoka (片岡 易之) | February 17, 1983 (aged 26) | | | (Japan) Saitama Seibu Lions |
| IF | 52 | Munenori Kawasaki (川﨑 宗則) | June 3, 1981 (aged 27) | | | (Japan) Fukuoka SoftBank Hawks |
| IF | 5 | Kenta Kurihara (栗原 健太) (Note: Replaced #25 Shuichi Murata after Round 2) | January 8, 1982 (aged 27) | | | (Japan) Hiroshima Toyo Carp |
| IF | 25 | Shuichi Murata (村田 修一) | December 28, 1980 (aged 28) | | | (Japan) Yokohama BayStars |
| IF | 6 | Hiroyuki Nakajima (中島 裕之) | July 31, 1982 (aged 26) | | | (Japan) Saitama Seibu Lions |
| IF | 9 | Michihiro Ogasawara (小笠原 道大) | October 25, 1973 (aged 35) | | | (Japan) Yomiuri Giants |
| OF | 23 | Norichika Aoki (青木 宣親) | January 5, 1982 (aged 27) | | | (Japan) Tokyo Yakult Swallows |
| OF | 1 | Kosuke Fukudome (福留 孝介) | April 26, 1977 (aged 31) | | | (United States) Chicago Cubs |
| OF | 41 | Atsunori Inaba (稲葉 篤紀) | August 3, 1972 (aged 36) | | | (Japan) Hokkaido Nippon-Ham Fighters |
| OF | 35 | Yoshiyuki Kamei (亀井 義行) | July 28, 1982 (aged 26) | | | (Japan) Yomiuri Giants |
| OF | 51 | Ichiro Suzuki (鈴木 一朗) | October 22, 1973 (aged 35) | | | (United States) Seattle Mariners |
| OF | 24 | Seiichi Uchikawa (内川 聖一) | August 4, 1982 (aged 26) | | | (Japan) Yokohama BayStars |

=== South Korea ===
Manager: 81 Kim In-sik (김인식, 金寅植)
Coaches: 80 Kim Sung-han (김성한, 金城漢), 79 Yang Sang-moon (양상문, 楊相文), 78 Lee Soon-chul (이순철, 李順喆), 77 Ryu Joong-il (류중일, 柳仲逸), 75 Kang Sung-woo (강성우, 姜盛友), 76 Kim Min-ho (김민호, 金敏浩)

| Pos. | No. | Player | Date of birth (age) | Bats | Throws | Club |
|---|---|---|---|---|---|---|
| P | 51 | Bong Jung-keun (봉중근, 奉重根) | July 15, 1980 (aged 28) | | | (South Korea) LG Twins |
| P | 21 | Chong Tae-hyon (정대현, 鄭大炫) | November 10, 1978 (aged 30) | | | (South Korea) SK Wyverns |
| P | 32 | Im Tae-hoon (임태훈, 林泰勳) | September 28, 1988 (aged 20) | | | (South Korea) Doosan Bears |
| P | 13 | Jang Won-sam (장원삼, 張洹三) | June 9, 1983 (aged 25) | | | (South Korea) Seoul Heroes |
| P | 19 | Jong Hyun-wook (정현욱, 鄭現旭) | December 2, 1978 (aged 30) | | | (South Korea) Samsung Lions |
| P | 31 | Kim Kwang-hyun (김광현, 金廣鉉) | July 2, 1988 (aged 20) | | | (South Korea) SK Wyverns |
| P | 11 | Lee Jae-woo (이재우, 李載雨) | February 9, 1980 (aged 29) | | | (South Korea) Doosan Bears |
| P | 20 | Lee Seung-ho (이승호, 李承浩) | September 9, 1981 (aged 27) | | | (South Korea) SK Wyverns |
| P | 12 | Lim Chang-yong (임창용, 林昌勇) | June 4, 1976 (aged 32) | | | (Japan) Tokyo Yakult Swallows |
| P | 17 | Oh Seung-hwan (오승환, 吳昇桓) | July 15, 1982 (aged 26) | | | (South Korea) Samsung Lions |
| P | 99 | Ryu Hyun-jin (류현진, 柳賢振) | March 25, 1987 (aged 21) | | | (South Korea) Hanwha Eagles |
| P | 1 | Son Min-han (손민한, 孫敏漢) | January 2, 1975 (aged 34) | | | (South Korea) Lotte Giants |
| P | 28 | Yoon Suk-min (윤석민, 尹錫珉) | July 24, 1986 (aged 22) | | | (South Korea) KIA Tigers |
| C | 47 | Kang Min-ho (강민호, 姜珉鎬) | August 18, 1985 (aged 23) | | | (South Korea) Lotte Giants |
| C | 26 | Park Kyung-oan (박경완, 朴勍完) | July 11, 1972 (aged 36) | | | (South Korea) SK Wyverns |
| IF | 2 | Choi Jeong (최정, 崔廷) | February 28, 1987 (aged 22) | | | (South Korea) SK Wyverns |
| IF | 8 | Jeong Keun-woo (정근우, 鄭根宇) | October 2, 1982 (aged 26) | | | (South Korea) SK Wyverns |
| IF | 52 | Kim Tae-kyun (김태균, 金泰均) | May 29, 1982 (aged 26) | | | (South Korea) Hanwha Eagles |
| IF | 14 | Ko Young-min (고영민, 高永民) | February 8, 1984 (aged 25) | | | (South Korea) Doosan Bears |
| IF | 6 | Lee Bum-ho (이범호, 李杋浩) | November 25, 1981 (aged 27) | | | (South Korea) Hanwha Eagles |
| IF | 10 | Lee Dae-ho (이대호, 李大浩) | June 21, 1982 (aged 26) | | | (South Korea) Lotte Giants |
| IF | 16 | Park Ki-hyuk (박기혁, 朴基赫) | June 4, 1981 (aged 27) | | | (South Korea) Lotte Giants |
| OF | 5 | Choo Shin-soo (추신수, 秋信守) | July 13, 1982 (aged 26) | | | (United States) Cleveland Indians |
| OF | 50 | Hyun-soo Kim (김현수, 金賢洙) | January 2, 1988 (aged 21) | | | (South Korea) Doosan Bears |
| OF | 35 | Lee Jin-young (이진영, 李晋暎) | June 15, 1980 (aged 28) | | | (South Korea) LG Twins |
| OF | 39 | Lee Jong-wook (이종욱, 李鍾郁) | June 18, 1980 (aged 28) | | | (South Korea) Doosan Bears |
| OF | 29 | Lee Taek-keun (이택근, 李宅根) | July 10, 1980 (aged 28) | | | (South Korea) Seoul Heroes |
| OF | 15 | Lee Yong-kyu (이용규, 李容圭) | August 26, 1985 (aged 23) | | | (South Korea) KIA Tigers |

== Pool B ==
=== Australia ===
Manager: 24 Jon Deeble
Coaches: 33 Paul Elliot, 10 (United States) Pat Kelly, 27 Graeme Lloyd, 2 Tony Harris, 43 Philip Dale

| Pos. | No. | Player | Date of birth (age) | Bats | Throws | Club |
|---|---|---|---|---|---|---|
| P | 7 | Craig Anderson | October 30, 1980 (age 28) | | | (Australia) New South Wales Patriots |
| P | 23 | Travis Blackley | November 4, 1982 (age 26) | | | (United States) Arizona Diamondbacks |
| P | 11 | Adam Bright | August 11, 1984 (age 24) | | | (United States) Colorado Rockies |
| P | 31 | Tristan Crawford | July 22, 1982 (age 26) | | | (Australia) Queensland Rams |
| P | 30 | Liam Hendriks | February 10, 1989 (age 20) | | | (United States) Minnesota Twins |
| P | 38 | Joshua Hill | March 27, 1983 (age 25) | | | (United States) Pittsburgh Pirates |
| P | 15 | Paul Mildren | May 3, 1984 (age 24) | | | (United States) Pittsburgh Pirates |
| P | 28 | Damian Moss | November 24, 1976 (age 32) | | | |
| P | 40 | Drew Naylor | May 31, 1986 (age 22) | | | (United States) Philadelphia Phillies |
| P | 35 | Chris Oxspring | May 13, 1977 (age 31) | | | (South Korea) LG Twins |
| P | 26 | Brad Thomas | October 12, 1977 (age 31) | | | (South Korea) Hanwha Eagles |
| P | 18 | Rich Thompson | June 1, 1984 (age 24) | | | (United States) Los Angeles Angels |
| P | 45 | David Welch | June 2, 1983 (age 25) | | | (United States) Milwaukee Brewers |
| P | 21 | Brendan Wise | January 9, 1986 (age 23) | | | (United States) Detroit Tigers |
| C | 9 | Andrew Graham | April 22, 1982 (age 26) | | | (United States) Detroit Tigers |
| C | 29 | Joel Naughton | August 27, 1986 (age 22) | | | (United States) Philadelphia Phillies |
| IF | 3 | James Beresford | January 19, 1989 (age 20) | | | (United States) Minnesota Twins |
| IF | 6 | Daniel Berg | November 21, 1984 (age 24) | | | (United States) Minnesota Twins |
| IF | 25 | Michael Collins | July 18, 1984 (age 24) | | | (Australia) Queensland Rams |
| IF | 12 | Brad Harman | November 19, 1985 (age 23) | | | (United States) Philadelphia Phillies |
| IF | 16 | Justin Huber | July 1, 1982 (age 26) | | | (United States) Minnesota Twins |
| IF | 20 | Luke Hughes | August 2, 1984 (age 24) | | | (United States) Minnesota Twins |
| IF | 36 | Ben Risinger | November 25, 1977 (age 31) | | | |
| IF | 13 | Stefan Welch | August 12, 1988 (age 20) | | | (United States) New York Mets |
| OF | 18 | Mitch Dening | July 17, 1988 (age 20) | | | (United States) Boston Red Sox |
| OF | 8 | Trent Oeltjen | February 28, 1983 (age 26) | | | (United States) Arizona Diamondbacks |
| OF | 17 | Brett Roneberg | February 5, 1979 (age 30) | | | (Australia) Queensland Rams |
| OF | 14 | Chris Snelling | December 3, 1981 (age 27) | | | |

=== Cuba ===
Manager: 39 Higinio Vélez
Coaches: 41 Francisco Escaurido (first base), 22 Enrique Cepero (third base), 34 José Elosegui, 30 Pedro Pérez, 21 Lourdes Gourriel (hitting)

| Pos. | No. | Player | Date of birth (age) | Bats | Throws | Club |
|---|---|---|---|---|---|---|
| P | 15 | Danny Betancourt | May 27, 1981 (aged 27) | Right | Right | Santiago de Cuba |
| P | 52 | Aroldis Chapman | February 28, 1988 (aged 21) | Left | Left | (Cuba) Holguín |
| P | 17 | Vladimir García | July 4, 1982 (aged 26) | Right | Right | (Cuba) Ciego de Ávila |
| P | 32 | Norberto González | October 10, 1979 (aged 29) | Left | Left | (Cuba) Cienfuegos |
| P | 48 | Yulieski González | June 20, 1980 (aged 28) | Left | Left | (Cuba) Habana |
| P | 59 | Ismel Jiménez | February 10, 1986 (aged 23) | Right | Right | (Cuba) Sancti Spíritus |
| P | 42 | Miguel Lahera | January 24, 1985 (aged 24) | Right | Right | (Cuba) La Habana |
| P | 99 | Pedro Luis Lazo | April 15, 1973 (aged 35) | Right | Right | (Cuba) Pinar del Río |
| P | 62 | Ciro Silvino Licea | November 28, 1975 (aged 33) | Right | Right | (Cuba) Granma |
| P | 97 | Yunesky Maya | August 28, 1981 (aged 27) | Right | Right | (Cuba) Pinar del Río |
| P | 74 | Luis Miguel Rodríguez | May 3, 1973 (aged 35) | Right | Right | (Cuba) Holguín |
| P | 92 | Yolexis Ulacia | August 6, 1977 (aged 31) | Right | Right | (Cuba) Villa Clara |
| P | 20 | Norge Luis Vera | October 3, 1971 (aged 37) | Right | Right | Santiago de Cuba |
| C | 40 | Rolando Meriño | February 17, 1971 (aged 38) | Right | Right | Santiago de Cuba |
| C | 46 | Yosvani Peraza | February 9, 1979 (aged 30) | Right | Right | (Cuba) Pinar del Río |
| C | 8 | Ariel Pestano | January 31, 1974 (aged 35) | Right | Right | (Cuba) Villa Clara |
| IF | 12 | Michel Enríquez | February 11, 1979 (aged 30) | Right | Right | (Cuba) Isla de la Juventud |
| IF | 10 | Yulieski Gurriel | June 9, 1984 (aged 24) | Right | Right | (Cuba) Sancti Spíritus |
| IF | 55 | Alexander Mayeta | February 22, 1977 (aged 32) | Left | Left | (Cuba) Industriales |
| IF | 3 | Luis Miguel Navas | February 2, 1980 (aged 29) | Right | Right | Santiago de Cuba |
| IF | 28 | Héctor Olivera | April 5, 1985 (aged 23) | Right | Right | Santiago de Cuba |
| IF | 2 | Eduardo Paret | October 23, 1972 (aged 36) | Right | Right | (Cuba) Villa Clara |
| IF | 14 | Joan Carlos Pedroso | July 23, 1979 (aged 29) | Right | Right | (Cuba) Las Tunas |
| OF | 56 | Leslie Anderson | March 30, 1982 (aged 26) | Left | Left | (Cuba) Camagüey |
| OF | 24 | Frederich Cepeda | April 13, 1980 (aged 28) | Switch | Right | (Cuba) Sancti Spíritus |
| OF | 51 | Yoenis Céspedes | October 18, 1985 (aged 23) | Right | Right | (Cuba) Granma |
| OF | 54 | Alfredo Despaigne | June 17, 1986 (aged 22) | Right | Right | (Cuba) Granma |
| OF | 26 | Leonys Martín | March 6, 1988 (aged 20) | Right | Right | (Cuba) Villa Clara |

=== Mexico ===
Manager: 9 Vinny Castilla
Coaches: 34 Fernando Valenzuela, 49 Teddy Higuera, 44 Armando Reynoso, 20 José Tolentino, 6 Ever Magallanes, 5 Houston Jiménez

| Pos. | No. | Player | Date of birth (age) | Bats | Throws | Club |
|---|---|---|---|---|---|---|
| P | 56 | Luis Ignacio Ayala | January 12, 1978 (Age 31) | | | (United States) Minnesota Twins |
| P | 33 | Jorge Campillo | August 10, 1978 (Age 30) | | | (United States) Atlanta Braves |
| P | 84 | Francisco Campos | December 8, 1972 (Age 36) | | | (Mexico) Piratas de Campeche |
| P | 51 | David Cortés | October 15, 1973 (Age 35) | | | (Mexico) Diablos Rojos del México |
| P | 45 | Elmer Dessens | January 13, 1971 (Age 38) | | | (United States) New York Mets |
| P | 19 | Rafael Díaz | December 12, 1970 (Age 38) | | | (Mexico) Saraperos de Saltillo |
| P | 13 | Rodrigo López | December 14, 1975 (Age 33) | | | (United States) Philadelphia Phillies |
| P | 29 | Pablo Ortega | November 7, 1976 (Age 32) | | | (Mexico) Tigres de Quintana Roo |
| P | 46 | Óliver Pérez | August 15, 1981 (Age 27) | | | (United States) New York Mets |
| P | 52 | Dennys Reyes | April 19, 1977 (Age 31) | | | (United States) St. Louis Cardinals |
| P | 73 | Ricardo Rincón | April 13, 1970 (Age 38) | | | (Mexico) Diablos Rojos del México |
| P | 60 | Francisco Rodríguez | February 26, 1983 (Age 26) | | | (United States) Los Angeles Angels |
| P | 48 | Joakim Soria | May 18, 1984 (Age 24) | | | (United States) Kansas City Royals |
| C | 32 | Rod Barajas | September 5, 1975 (Age 33) | | | (Canada) Toronto Blue Jays |
| C | 35 | Miguel Ojeda | January 29, 1975 (Age 33) | | | (Mexico) Diablos Rojos del México |
| IF | 3 | Jorge Cantú | January 30, 1982 (Age 26) | | | (United States) Florida Marlins |
| IF | 47 | Erubiel Durazo | January 23, 1974 (Age 35) | | | (Mexico) Sultanes de Monterrey |
| IF | 23 | Adrián González | May 8, 1982 (Age 26) | | | (United States) San Diego Padres |
| IF | 2 | Edgar Gonzalez | June 14, 1978 (Age 29) | | | (United States) San Diego Padres |
| IF | 25 | Jerry Hairston Jr. | May 29, 1976 (Age 32) | | | (United States) Cincinnati Reds |
| IF | 50 | Agustín Murillo | May 5, 1982 (Age 26) | | | (United States) Arizona Diamondbacks |
| IF | 1 | Augie Ojeda | December 20, 1974 (Age 34) | | | (United States) Arizona Diamondbacks |
| IF | 26 | Óscar Robles | April 9, 1976 (Age 32) | | | (Mexico) Diablos Rojos del México |
| IF | 17 | Freddy Sandoval | August 16, 1982 (Age 26) | | | (United States) Los Angeles Angels |
| IF | 38 | Jorge Vázquez | March 15, 1982 (Age 26) | | | (United States) New York Yankees |
| OF | 8 | Alfredo Amezaga | January 16, 1978 (Age 30) | | | (United States) Florida Marlins |
| OF | 10 | Karim García | October 29, 1975 (Age 33) | | | (South Korea) Lotte Giants |
| OF | 14 | Scott Hairston | May 25, 1980 (Age 28) | | | (United States) San Diego Padres |
| OF | 22 | Cristhian Presichi (Note: Replaced #8 Alfredo Amezaga after Round 1) | July 28, 1980 (Age 28) | | | (Mexico) Saraperos de Saltillo |
| OF | 7 | Mario Valenzuela (Note: Replaced #47 Erubiel Durazo after Round 1) | March 10, 1977 (Age 32) | | | (Mexico) Diablos Rojos del México |

=== South Africa ===
Manager: Rick Magnante
Coaches: (United States) Lee Smith, Brian McArn, Mike Randall, Neil Adonis, Alan Phillips

| Pos. | No. | Player | Date of birth (age) | Bats | Throws | Club |
|---|---|---|---|---|---|---|
| P | 30 | Alessio Angelucci | July 28, 1988 (aged 20) | | | (United States) San Diego Padres |
| P | 35 | Barry Armitage | May 11, 1979 (aged 29) | | | Free Agent |
| P | 27 | Matthew Dancer | October 8, 1983 (aged 25) | | | (South Africa) Sluggers |
| P | 15 | Shannon Ekermans | June 5, 1987 (aged 21) | | | (United States) North Dakota State University |
| P | 37 | Jared Elario | October 14, 1988 (aged 20) | | | (South Africa) Bothasig |
| P | 14 | Justin Erasmus | January 22, 1990 (aged 19) | | | (United States) Boston Red Sox |
| P | 19 | Donavon Hendricks | March 9, 1986 (aged 22) | | | (Australia) Victoria Aces |
| P | 76 | Gavin Jeffries | November 24, 1976 (aged 32) | | | (South Africa) Bellville Tigers |
| P | 31 | Dylan Lindsay | September 4, 1991 (aged 17) | | | (United States) Kansas City Royals |
| P | 13 | Jacobus Mostert | April 25, 1988 (aged 20) | | | (South Africa) Bothasig |
| P | 73 | Hein Robb | May 12, 1992 (aged 16) | | | (United States) Minnesota Twins |
| P | 25 | Darryn Smith | August 2, 1975 (aged 33) | | | (South Africa) Rockets |
| P | 3 | Robert Verschuren | May 31, 1984 (aged 24) | | | (South Africa) Kempton Red Sox |
| C | 18 | Kyle Botha | August 7, 1988 (aged 20) | | | (South Africa) Bothasig |
| C | 88 | Karl Weitz | | | | (South Africa) Varsity Old Boys |
| C | 9 | Terence White | February 12, 1982 (aged 27) | | | (South Africa) Boksburg Cardinals |
| IF | 11 | Zaid Hendricks | April 4, 1990 (aged 18) | | | (South Africa) Bothasig |
| IF | 1 | Justin Lazarus | November 17, 1988 (aged 20) | | | (South Africa) Bothasig |
| IF | 28 | Gift Ngoepe | January 18, 1990 (aged 19) | | | (United States) Pittsburgh Pirates |
| IF | 7 | Anthony Phillips | April 11, 1990 (aged 18) | | | (United States) Seattle Mariners |
| IF | 2 | Jonathan Phillips | April 16, 1986 (aged 22) | | | (South Africa) Bellville Tigers |
| IF | 22 | Allan Randal | August 17, 1984 (aged 24) | | | (South Africa) Bellville Tigers |
| IF | 26 | Gavin Ray | March 1, 1985 (aged 24) | | | (South Africa) Mustangs |
| IF | 23 | Brett Willemburg | July 2, 1984 (aged 24) | | | (South Africa) Varsity Old Boys |
| OF | 6 | Martin Gordon | June 13, 1988 (aged 20) | | | (United States) Francis Marion University |
| OF | 42 | Richard Holgate | March 19, 1988 (aged 20) | | | (South Africa) Rockets |
| OF | 20 | Paul Rutgers | January 17, 1984 (aged 25) | | | (Australia) Victoria Aces |
| OF | 38 | Ashley Scott | July 14, 1987 (aged 21) | | | (United States) Tacoma Community College |

== Pool C ==
=== Canada ===
Manager: 21 Ernie Whitt
Coaches: 3 Larry Walker, 49 Paul Quantrill, 42 Denis Boucher, 34 Tim Leiper, 27 Greg Hamilton, 20 Greg O'Halloran

| Pos. | No. | Player | Date of birth (age) | Bats | Throws | Club |
|---|---|---|---|---|---|---|
| P | 17 | Phillippe Aumont | January 7, 1989 (aged 20) | | | (United States) Philadelphia Phillies |
| P | 35 | Chris Begg | June 12, 1979 (aged 29) | | | (United States) San Francisco Giants |
| P | 26 | T. J. Burton | July 30, 1983 (aged 25) | | | (United States) Houston Astros |
| P | 28 | Jesse Crain | July 5, 1981 (aged 27) | | | (United States) Minnesota Twins |
| P | 23 | David Davidson | April 23, 1984 (aged 24) | | | (United States) Pittsburgh Pirates |
| P | 18 | Scott Diamond | July 30, 1986 (aged 22) | | | (United States) Atlanta Braves |
| P | 22 | Bryan Dumesnil | September 19, 1983 (aged 25) | | | (United States) Atlanta Braves |
| P | 31 | Steve Green | January 26, 1978 (aged 31) | | | (United States) Boston Red Sox |
| P | 25 | Mike Johnson | October 3, 1975 (aged 33) | | | (South Korea) SK Wyverns |
| P | 52 | Christopher Leroux | April 14, 1984 (aged 24) | | | (United States) Florida Marlins |
| P | 36 | Brooks McNiven | June 19, 1981 (aged 27) | | | (United States) San Francisco Giants |
| P | 32 | Vince Perkins | September 27, 1981 (aged 27) | | | (United States) Camden Riversharks |
| P | 48 | Scott Richmond | August 30, 1979 (aged 29) | | | (Canada) Toronto Blue Jays |
| C | 1 | Luke Carlin | December 20, 1980 (aged 28) | | | (United States) Arizona Diamondbacks |
| C | 5 | Brett Lawrie | January 18, 1990 (aged 19) | | | (United States) Milwaukee Brewers |
| C | 55 | Russell Martin | February 15, 1983 (aged 26) | | | (United States) New York Yankees |
| IF | 13 | Chris Barnwell | March 1, 1979 (aged 30) | | | (United States) Houston Astros |
| IF | 29 | Shawn Bowman | December 9, 1984 (aged 24) | | | (United States) New York Mets |
| IF | 11 | Stubby Clapp | February 24, 1973 (aged 36) | | | |
| IF | 47 | Corey Koskie | June 28, 1973 (aged 35) | | | (United States) Chicago Cubs |
| IF | 33 | Justin Morneau | May 15, 1981 (aged 27) | | | (United States) Minnesota Twins |
| IF | 4 | Pete Orr | June 8, 1979 (aged 29) | | | (United States) Washington Nationals |
| IF | 19 | Joey Votto | September 10, 1983 (aged 25) | | | (United States) Cincinnati Reds |
| OF | 44 | Jason Bay | September 20, 1978 (aged 30) | | | (United States) New York Mets |
| OF | 12 | Matt Stairs | February 27, 1968 (aged 41) | | | (United States) Philadelphia Phillies |
| OF | 7 | Adam Stern | February 12, 1980 (aged 29) | | | (United States) Milwaukee Brewers |
| OF | 24 | Mark Teahen | September 6, 1981 (aged 27) | | | (United States) Kansas City Royals |
| OF | 8 | Nick Weglarz | December 16, 1987 (aged 21) | | | (United States) Cleveland Indians |

=== Italy ===
Manager: 5 Marco Mazzieri
Coaches: 21 Mike Hargrove, 26 Tom Trebelhorn, 23 Alberto D'Auria, 1 William Holmberg, 31 Mike Piazza, 33 Gilberto Gerali

| Pos. | No. | Player | Date of birth (age) | Bats | Throws | Club |
|---|---|---|---|---|---|---|
| P | 28 | Cody Cillo | July 17, 1980 (aged 28) | | | (Italy) Italeri Bologna |
| P | 35 | Chris Cooper | October 31, 1978 (aged 30) | | | (Italy) Montedeipaschi Grosseto |
| P | 40 | Roberto Corradini | September 23, 1978 (aged 30) | | | (Italy) Ceci & Negri Parma |
| P | 42 | Tiago Da Silva | March 28, 1985 (aged 23) | | | San Marino |
| P | 15 | Mark DiFelice | August 23, 1976 (aged 32) | | | (United States) Milwaukee Brewers |
| P | 55 | Lenny DiNardo | September 19, 1979 (aged 29) | | | (United States) Oakland Athletics |
| P | 49 | Jason Grilli | November 11, 1976 (aged 32) | | | (United States) Colorado Rockies |
| P | 18 | B. J. LaMura | January 1, 1981 (aged 28) | | | |
| P | 17 | Alex Maestri | June 1, 1985 (aged 23) | | | (United States) Chicago Cubs |
| P | 30 | Kasey Olemberger | March 18, 1978 (aged 30) | | | |
| P | 54 | Adam Ottavino | November 22, 1985 (aged 23) | | | (United States) St. Louis Cardinals |
| P | 50 | Luca Panerati | December 2, 1989 (aged 19) | | | (United States) Cincinnati Reds |
| P | 29 | Dan Serafini | January 25, 1974 (aged 35) | | | |
| C | 64 | Francisco Cervelli | March 6, 1986 (aged 22) | | | (United States) New York Yankees |
| C | 10 | Vinny Rottino | April 7, 1980 (aged 28) | | | (United States) Milwaukee Brewers |
| IF | 27 | Frank Catalanotto | April 27, 1974 (aged 34) | | | (United States) New York Mets |
| IF | 4 | Mike Costanzo | September 9, 1983 (aged 25) | | | (United States) Baltimore Orioles |
| IF | 34 | Davide Dallospedale | September 12, 1977 (aged 31) | | | (Italy) Ceci & Negri Parma |
| IF | 14 | Alex Liddi | August 14, 1988 (aged 20) | | | (United States) Seattle Mariners |
| IF | 47 | Giuseppe Mazzanti | April 5, 1983 (aged 25) | | | (Italy) Caffè Danesi Nettuno |
| IF | 8 | Nick Punto | November 8, 1977 (aged 31) | | | (United States) Minnesota Twins |
| IF | 3 | Jack Santora | October 6, 1976 (aged 32) | | | (Italy) Telemarket Rimini |
| OF | 45 | Mario Chiarini | January 7, 1981 (aged 28) | | | (Italy) Telemarket Rimini |
| OF | 20 | Peter Ciofrone | September 28, 1983 (aged 25) | | | (United States) San Diego Padres |
| OF | 19 | Chris Denorfia | July 15, 1980 (aged 28) | | | (United States) San Diego Padres |
| OF | 9 | Andrea De Santis | December 25, 1982 (aged 26) | | | (Italy) Montedeipaschi Grosseto |
| OF | 37 | Valentino Pascucci | November 17, 1978 (aged 30) | | | (United States) Los Angeles Dodgers |
| OF | 2 | Leonardo Zileri | April 3, 1984 (aged 24) | | | (Italy) Ceci & Negri Parma |

=== United States ===
Manager: 5 Davey Johnson
Coaches: 8 Reggie Smith, 27 Marcel Lachemann, 11 Barry Larkin, 3 Billy Ripken, 20 Mike Schmidt, 30 Mel Stottlemyre

| Pos. | No. | Player | Date of birth (age) | Bats | Throws | Club |
|---|---|---|---|---|---|---|
| P | 99 | Heath Bell | September 29, 1977 (aged 31) | | | (United States) San Diego Padres |
| P | 51 | Jonathan Broxton | June 16, 1984 (aged 24) | | | (United States) Los Angeles Dodgers |
| P | 34 | John Grabow | November 4, 1978 (aged 30) | | | (United States) Pittsburgh Pirates |
| P | 46 | Jeremy Guthrie | April 8, 1979 (aged 29) | | | (United States) Baltimore Orioles |
| P | 38 | Joel Hanrahan | October 6, 1981 (aged 27) | | | (United States) Washington Nationals |
| P | 42 | LaTroy Hawkins | December 21, 1972 (aged 36) | | | (United States) Houston Astros |
| P | 39 | J. P. Howell | April 25, 1983 (aged 25) | | | (United States) Tampa Bay Rays |
| P | 33 | Ted Lilly | January 4, 1976 (aged 33) | | | (United States) Chicago Cubs |
| P | 29 | Matt Lindstrom | February 11, 1980 (aged 29) | | | (United States) Florida Marlins |
| P | 44 | Roy Oswalt | August 29, 1977 (aged 31) | | | (United States) Houston Astros |
| P | 22 | Jake Peavy | May 31, 1981 (aged 27) | | | (United States) San Diego Padres |
| P | 23 | J. J. Putz | February 22, 1977 (aged 32) | | | (United States) New York Mets |
| P | 62 | Scot Shields | July 22, 1975 (aged 33) | | | (United States) Los Angeles Angels |
| P | 37 | Matt Thornton | September 15, 1976 (aged 32) | | | (United States) Chicago White Sox |
| P | 31 | Brad Ziegler | October 10, 1979 (aged 29) | | | (United States) Oakland Athletics |
| C | 26 | Chris Iannetta | April 8, 1983 (aged 25) | | | (United States) Colorado Rockies |
| C | 16 | Brian McCann | February 20, 1984 (aged 25) | | | (United States) Atlanta Braves |
| IF | 7 | Mark DeRosa | February 26, 1975 (aged 34) | | | (United States) Cleveland Indians |
| IF | 2 | Derek Jeter | June 26, 1974 (aged 34) | | | (United States) New York Yankees |
| IF | 10 | Chipper Jones | April 24, 1972 (aged 36) | | | (United States) Atlanta Braves |
| IF | 13 | Evan Longoria (Note: Replaced #10 Chipper Jones after Round 2) | October 7, 1985 (aged 23) | | | (United States) Tampa Bay Rays |
| IF | 15 | Dustin Pedroia | August 17, 1983 (aged 25) | | | (United States) Boston Red Sox |
| IF | 6 | Brian Roberts (Note: Replaced #15 Dustin Pedroia after Round 1) | October 9, 1977 (aged 31) | | | (United States) Baltimore Orioles |
| IF | 1 | Jimmy Rollins | November 27, 1978 (aged 30) | | | (United States) Philadelphia Phillies |
| IF | 4 | David Wright | December 20, 1982 (aged 26) | | | (United States) New York Mets |
| IF | 21 | Kevin Youkilis | March 15, 1979 (aged 29) | | | (United States) Boston Red Sox |
| OF | 18 | Ryan Braun | November 17, 1983 (aged 25) | | | (United States) Milwaukee Brewers |
| OF | 17 | Adam Dunn | November 9, 1979 (aged 29) | | | (United States) Washington Nationals |
| OF | 28 | Curtis Granderson | March 16, 1981 (aged 27) | | | (United States) Detroit Tigers |
| OF | 50 | Shane Victorino | November 30, 1980 (aged 28) | | | (United States) Philadelphia Phillies |

=== Venezuela ===
Manager: 8 Luis Sojo
Coaches: 41 Andrés Galarraga, 20 Tony Armas, 34 Omar Malavé, 5 Oscar Escobar, 10 Roberto Espinoza, 33 Luis Dorante

| Pos. | No. | Player | Date of birth (age) | Bats | Throws | Club |
|---|---|---|---|---|---|---|
| P | 63 | Iván Blanco | September 24, 1983 (age 25) | | | (Venezuela) Cardenales de Lara |
| P | 40 | Armando Galarraga | January 15, 1982 (age 27) | | | (United States) Arizona Diamondbacks |
| P | 54 | Enrique González | July 14, 1982 (age 26) | | | (United States) Boston Red Sox |
| P | 22 | Jan Granado | September 26, 1982 (age 26) | | | (Mexico) Vaqueros Laguna |
| P | 59 | Félix Hernández | April 8, 1986 (age 22) | | | (United States) Seattle Mariners |
| P | 39 | Yoel Hernández | April 15, 1980 (age 28) | | | (United States) Philadelphia Phillies |
| P | 44 | Orber Moreno | April 27, 1977 (age 31) | | | (Venezuela) Leones del Caracas |
| P | 16 | Víctor Moreno | June 10, 1979 (age 29) | | | (Venezuela) Tigres de Aragua |
| P | 43 | Ramón Ramírez | September 16, 1982 (age 26) | | | (United States) Cincinnati Reds |
| P | 75 | Francisco Rodríguez | January 7, 1982 (age 27) | | | (United States) Milwaukee Brewers |
| P | 52 | Carlos Silva | April 23, 1979 (age 29) | | | (United States) Seattle Mariners |
| P | 48 | Carlos Vásquez | December 6, 1982 (age 26) | | | |
| P | 31 | Víctor Zambrano | August 6, 1975 (age 33) | | | (Venezuela) Navegantes del Magallanes |
| C | 21 | Henry Blanco | August 29, 1971 (age 37) | | | (United States) San Diego Padres |
| C | 19 | Ramón Hernández | May 20, 1976 (age 32) | | | (United States) Cincinnati Reds |
| C | 51 | Max Ramírez | October 11, 1984 (age 24) | | | (United States) Texas Rangers |
| IF | 24 | Miguel Cabrera | April 18, 1983 (age 25) | | | (United States) Detroit Tigers |
| IF | 2 | Carlos Guillén | September 30, 1975 (age 33) | | | (United States) Detroit Tigers |
| IF | 3 | César Izturis | February 10, 1980 (age 29) | | | (United States) Baltimore Orioles |
| IF | 4 | José López | November 24, 1983 (age 25) | | | (United States) Seattle Mariners |
| IF | 7 | Luis Maza | June 22, 1980 (age 28) | | | (United States) Los Angeles Dodgers |
| IF | 6 | Melvin Mora | February 2, 1972 (age 37) | | | (United States) Baltimore Orioles |
| IF | 12 | Marco Scutaro | October 30, 1975 (age 33) | | | (United States) Boston Red Sox |
| OF | 53 | Bobby Abreu | March 11, 1974 (age 34) | | | (United States) Los Angeles Angels |
| OF | 11 | Gregor Blanco | December 12, 1983 (age 25) | | | (United States) Atlanta Braves |
| OF | 47 | Endy Chávez | February 7, 1978 (age 31) | | | (United States) Seattle Mariners |
| OF | 30 | Magglio Ordóñez | January 28, 1974 (age 35) | | | (United States) Detroit Tigers |
| OF | 1 | Gerardo Parra | May 6, 1987 (age 21) | | | (United States) Arizona Diamondbacks |

== Pool D ==
=== Dominican Republic ===
Manager: 17 Felipe Alou
Coaches: 55 Luis Pujols, 32 Mario Soto, 6 Junior Noboa, 4 Alfredo Griffin, 19 Luis Silverio, 31 Ramon Henderson

| Pos. | No. | Player | Date of birth (age) | Bats | Throws | Club |
|---|---|---|---|---|---|---|
| P | 66 | José Arredondo | March 30, 1984 (aged 24) | | | (United States) Los Angeles Angels |
| P | 46 | Johnny Cueto | February 15, 1986 (aged 23) | | | (United States) Cincinnati Reds |
| P | 38 | Ubaldo Jiménez | January 22, 1984 (aged 25) | | | (United States) Colorado Rockies |
| P | 20 | Julio Mañón | June 10, 1973 (aged 35) | | | (United States) Long Island Ducks |
| P | 49 | Carlos Mármol | October 14, 1982 (aged 26) | | | (United States) Chicago Cubs |
| P | 43 | Dámaso Marte | February 14, 1975 (aged 34) | | | (United States) New York Yankees |
| P | 45 | Pedro Martínez | October 25, 1971 (aged 37) | | | |
| P | 58 | Tony Peña | January 9, 1982 (aged 27) | | | (United States) Arizona Diamondbacks |
| P | 57 | Odalis Pérez | June 11, 1977 (aged 31) | | | |
| P | 53 | Rafael Pérez | May 15, 1982 (aged 26) | | | (United States) Cleveland Indians |
| P | 51 | Julián Tavárez | May 22, 1973 (aged 35) | | | |
| P | 44 | Pedro Viola | June 29, 1983 (aged 25) | | | (United States) Cincinnati Reds |
| P | 36 | Edinson Vólquez | July 3, 1983 (aged 25) | | | (United States) Cincinnati Reds |
| C | 25 | Juan Brito | November 7, 1977 (aged 31) | | | (Dominican Republic) |
| C | 33 | Alberto Castillo | February 10, 1970 (aged 39) | | | |
| C | 21 | Miguel Olivo | July 15, 1978 (aged 30) | | | (United States) Kansas City Royals |
| IF | 16 | Willy Aybar | March 9, 1983 (aged 25) | | | (United States) Tampa Bay Rays |
| IF | 24 | Robinson Canó | October 22, 1982 (aged 26) | | | (United States) New York Yankees |
| IF | 34 | David Ortiz | November 18, 1975 (aged 33) | | | (United States) Boston Red Sox |
| IF | 2 | Hanley Ramírez | December 23, 1983 (aged 25) | | | (United States) Florida Marlins |
| IF | 7 | José Reyes | June 11, 1983 (aged 25) | | | (United States) New York Mets |
| IF | 14 | Fernando Tatís | January 1, 1975 (aged 34) | | | (United States) New York Mets |
| IF | 10 | Miguel Tejada | May 25, 1974 (aged 34) | | | (United States) Houston Astros |
| OF | 18 | Moisés Alou | July 3, 1966 (aged 42) | | | |
| OF | 23 | José Bautista | October 19, 1980 (aged 28) | | | (Canada) Toronto Blue Jays |
| OF | 15 | Nelson Cruz | July 1, 1980 (aged 28) | | | (United States) Texas Rangers |
| OF | 11 | José Guillén | May 17, 1976 (aged 32) | | | (United States) Kansas City Royals |
| OF | 3 | Willy Taveras | December 25, 1981 (aged 27) | | | (United States) Cincinnati Reds |

=== Netherlands ===
Manager: 6 Rod Delmonico
Coaches: 28 Bert Blyleven, 26 Bill Froberg, 34 Wim Martinus, 32 Hensley Meulens, Jim Stoeckel, Ben Thijssen

| Pos. | No. | Player | Date of birth (age) | Bats | Throws | Club |
|---|---|---|---|---|---|---|
| P | 25 | David Bergman | August 16, 1981 (aged 27) | | | (Netherlands) Corendon Kinheim |
| P | 44 | Leon Boyd | August 30, 1983 (aged 25) | | | (Netherlands) DOOR Neptunus |
| P | 19 | Rob Cordemans | October 31, 1974 (aged 34) | | | (Netherlands) Sparta-Feyenoord |
| P | 3 | Berry van Driel | December 26, 1984 (aged 24) | | | (Netherlands) Neptunus |
| P | 13 | Michiel van Kampen | January 23, 1976 (aged 33) | | | (Netherlands) Kinheim |
| P | 36 | Diego Markwell | August 16, 1981 (aged 27) | | | (Netherlands) Neptunus |
| P | 29 | Dennis Neuman | October 18, 1989 (aged 19) | | | (United States) Boston Red Sox |
| P | 47 | Sidney Ponson | November 2, 1976 (aged 32) | | | |
| P | 31 | Alexander Smit | October 2, 1985 (aged 23) | | | (United States) Cincinnati Reds |
| P | 51 | Tom Stuifbergen | September 26, 1988 (aged 20) | | | (United States) Minnesota Twins |
| P | 45 | J. C. Sulbaran | November 9, 1989 (aged 19) | | | (United States) Cincinnati Reds |
| P | 56 | Rick van den Hurk | May 22, 1985 (aged 23) | | | (United States) Florida Marlins |
| P | 9 | Pim Walsma | February 3, 1987 (aged 22) | | | (Netherlands) Amsterdam Pirates |
| C | 50 | Kenley Jansen | September 30, 1987 (aged 21) | | | (United States) Los Angeles Dodgers |
| C | 24 | Sidney de Jong | April 14, 1979 (aged 29) | | | (Netherlands) Amsterdam Pirates |
| C | 40 | Sharlon Schoop | April 15, 1987 (aged 21) | | | (United States) San Francisco Giants |
| IF | 12 | Sharnol Adriana | November 13, 1970 (aged 38) | | | (Mexico) Rojos del Águila de Veracruz |
| IF | 2 | Yurendell de Caster | September 26, 1979 (aged 29) | | | (United States) Detroit Tigers |
| IF | 5 | Michael Duursma | February 26, 1978 (aged 31) | | | (Netherlands) Pioniers |
| IF | 41 | Vince Rooi | December 13, 1981 (aged 27) | | | (Netherlands) Kinheim |
| IF | 35 | Randall Simon | May 25, 1975 (aged 33) | | | (United States) Newark Bears |
| IF | 43 | Curt Smith | September 9, 1986 (aged 22) | | | (United States) St. Louis Cardinals |
| IF | 4 | Hainley Statia | January 19, 1986 (aged 23) | | | (United States) Los Angeles Angels |
| OF | 37 | Bryan Engelhardt | January 10, 1982 (aged 27) | | | (Netherlands) Kinheim |
| OF | 67 | Greg Halman | August 26, 1987 (aged 21) | | | (United States) Seattle Mariners |
| OF | 21 | Gene Kingsale | August 20, 1976 (aged 32) | | | (Netherlands) DOOR Neptunus |
| OF | 18 | Dirk Van Klooster | April 23, 1976 (aged 32) | | | (Netherlands) Kinheim |
| OF | 27 | Danny Rombley | November 26, 1979 (aged 29) | | | (Netherlands) Kinheim |

=== Panama ===
Manager: 11 Héctor López
Coaches: 53 Ricardo Medina, 56 Len Picota, 24 Allan Lewis, 43 Luis Ortiz, 5 Luis Molina

| Pos. | No. | Player | Date of birth (age) | Bats | Throws | Club |
|---|---|---|---|---|---|---|
| P | 16 | Abraham Atencio | February 16, 1977 (age 32) | | | |
| P | 12 | Manuel Campos | January 12, 1990 (age 19) | | | (United States) Seattle Mariners |
| P | 14 | Yeliar Castro | December 3, 1987 (age 21) | | | (United States) Atlanta Braves |
| P | 27 | Bruce Chen | June 19, 1977 (age 31) | | | (United States) Kansas City Royals |
| P | 36 | Manuel Corpas | December 3, 1982 (age 26) | | | (United States) Colorado Rockies |
| P | 25 | Jorge Cortez | September 4, 1972 (age 36) | | | |
| P | 40 | Angel Cuan | May 29, 1989 (age 19) | | | (Panama) |
| P | 21 | Paolo Espino | January 10, 1987 (age 22) | | | (United States) Cleveland Indians |
| P | 15 | Rafael Medina | February 15, 1975 (age 34) | | | |
| P | 81 | Gilberto Mendez | November 15, 1974 (age 34) | | | |
| P | 55 | Ramiro Mendoza | June 15, 1972 (age 36) | | | |
| P | 30 | Eliecer Navarro | October 26, 1987 (age 21) | | | (United States) Pittsburgh Pirates |
| P | 17 | Arquimeses Nieto | April 28, 1989 (age 19) | | | (United States) St. Louis Cardinals |
| C | 8 | Damaso Espino | May 8, 1983 (age 25) | | | (United States) Cleveland Indians |
| C | 19 | Cesar Quintero | November 16, 1982 (age 26) | | | |
| C | 51 | Carlos Ruiz | January 22, 1979 (age 30) | | | (United States) Philadelphia Phillies |
| IF | 35 | Avelino Asprilla | January 1, 1981 (age 28) | | | |
| IF | 10 | Javier Castillo | August 29, 1983 (age 25) | | | (United States) Chicago White Sox |
| IF | 22 | Ángel Chávez | July 22, 1981 (age 27) | | | (United States) Boston Red Sox |
| IF | 26 | Audes De Leon | June 26, 1979 (age 29) | | | |
| IF | 6 | Kevin Ramos | June 6, 1986 (age 22) | | | (United States) Los Angeles Angels |
| IF | 2 | Rubén Tejada | September 1, 1989 (age 19) | | | (United States) New York Mets |
| IF | 42 | Julio Zuleta | March 28, 1975 (age 33) | | | |
| OF | 4 | Earl Agnoly | November 18, 1975 (age 33) | | | |
| OF | 63 | Luis Durango | April 23, 1986 (age 22) | | | (United States) San Diego Padres |
| OF | 45 | Carlos Lee | June 20, 1976 (age 32) | | | (United States) Houston Astros |
| OF | 28 | Rubén Rivera | November 14, 1973 (age 35) | | | (Mexico) Piratas de Campeche |
| OF | 20 | Concepción Rodriguez | September 19, 1986 (age 22) | | | (United States) Atlanta Braves |

=== Puerto Rico ===
Manager: José Oquendo
Coaches: Carlos Arroyo, Eduardo Pérez, Iván DeJesús, Charlie Montoyo, Gil Rondon, Jerry Morales

| Pos. | No. | Player | Date of birth (age) | Bats | Throws | Club |
|---|---|---|---|---|---|---|
| P | 36 | Giancarlo Alvarado | January 24, 1978 (aged 31) | | | (Chinese Taipei) Uni-President 7-Eleven Lions |
| P | 38 | Fernando Cabrera | November 16, 1981 (aged 27) | | | (United States) Boston Red Sox |
| P | 49 | Pedro Feliciano | August 25, 1976 (aged 32) | | | (United States) New York Mets |
| P | 27 | Nelson Figueroa | May 18, 1974 (aged 34) | | | (United States) New York Mets |
| P | 44 | Carlos Gutiérrez | September 22, 1986 (aged 22) | | | (United States) Minnesota Twins |
| P | 48 | Javier López | July 11, 1977 (aged 31) | | | (United States) Boston Red Sox |
| P | 77 | Iván Maldonado | June 7, 1980 (aged 28) | | | |
| P | 31 | Josué Matos | March 15, 1978 (aged 30) | | | (Puerto Rico) Gigantes de Carolina |
| P | 52 | Saúl Rivera | December 7, 1977 (aged 31) | | | (United States) Washington Nationals |
| P | 34 | Orlando Román | November 28, 1978 (aged 30) | | | (Canada) Toronto Blue Jays |
| P | 16 | J. C. Romero | June 4, 1976 (aged 32) | | | (United States) Philadelphia Phillies |
| P | 53 | Jonathan Sánchez | November 19, 1982 (aged 26) | | | (United States) San Francisco Giants |
| P | 45 | Ian Snell | October 30, 1981 (aged 27) | | | (United States) Pittsburgh Pirates |
| P | 33 | Javier Vázquez | July 25, 1976 (aged 32) | | | (United States) Atlanta Braves |
| C | 4 | Yadier Molina | July 13, 1982 (aged 26) | | | (United States) St. Louis Cardinals |
| C | 7 | Iván Rodríguez | November 30, 1971 (aged 37) | | | (United States) Texas Rangers/Washington Nationals |
| C | 18 | Geovany Soto | January 20, 1983 (aged 26) | | | (United States) Chicago Cubs |
| IF | 10 | Mike Avilés | March 13, 1981 (aged 27) | | | (United States) Kansas City Royals |
| IF | 13 | Alex Cora | October 18, 1975 (aged 33) | | | (United States) New York Mets |
| IF | 21 | Carlos Delgado | June 25, 1972 (aged 36) | | | (United States) New York Mets |
| IF | 26 | Andy González | December 15, 1981 (aged 27) | | | (United States) Florida Marlins |
| IF | 2 | Felipe López | May 12, 1980 (aged 28) | | | (United States) Arizona Diamondbacks |
| IF | 12 | Ramón Vázquez | August 21, 1976 (aged 32) | | | (United States) Pittsburgh Pirates |
| OF | 15 | Carlos Beltrán | April 24, 1977 (aged 31) | | | (United States) New York Mets |
| OF | 43 | Hiram Bocachica | March 4, 1976 (aged 33) | | | (Japan) Saitama Seibu Lions |
| OF | 23 | Jesus Feliciano | June 6, 1979 (aged 29) | | | (United States) New York Mets |
| OF | 19 | Alex Ríos | February 18, 1981 (aged 28) | | | (Canada) Toronto Blue Jays |
| OF | 51 | Bernie Williams | September 13, 1968 (aged 40) | | | |

== Notes ==
| Preceded by 2006 | World Baseball Classic rosters | Succeeded by 2013 |
