= Baseball at the 2008 Summer Olympics – Team squads =

The following contains the team squads for the Beijing 2008 Summer Olympics.

== Canada ==
The roster for the Canada national baseball team was as follows:

- Manager: Terry Puhl, Greg Hamilton
- Coaches: Denis Boucher (Pitching coach), Rob Ducey

Pos.	No.	Player	Date of birth (age)	Bats	Throws	Club
P	24	James Avery	June 10, 1984			(United States) Chattanooga Lookouts (AA)
P	35	Chris Begg	September 12, 1979			(United States) San Jose Giants (A+)
P	22	Tim Burton	July 30, 1983			(United States) Akron Aeros (AA)
P	37	Rhéal Cormier	April 23, 1967			(Canada) Moncton Mets
P	23	David Davidson	April 23, 1984			(United States) Altoona Curve (AA)
P	31	Steve Green	January 26, 1978			(United States) Lehigh Valley IronPigs (AAA)
P	25	Mike Johnson	October 3, 1975			(Taiwan) La New Bears
P	32	Brooks McNiven	June 19, 1981			(United States) Connecticut Defenders (AA)
P	34	Chris Reitsma	December 31, 1977			Free agent
P	42	R.J. Swindle	July 7, 1983			(United States) Lehigh Valley IronPigs (AAA)
C	28	David Corrente	October 13, 1983			(United States) Dunedin Blue Jays (A)
C	30	Chris Robinson	May 12, 1984			(United States) Tennessee Smokies (AA)
	17	Emerson Frostad	January 13, 1983			(United States) Frisco RoughRiders (AA)
	14	Brett Lawrie	January 18, 1990			(Canada) Langley Blaze
IF	11	Stubby Clapp	February 24, 1973			(United States) Lexington Legends (coach)
IF	15	Emmanuel Garcia	March 4, 1986			(United States) Binghamton Mets (AA)
IF	9	Matt Rogelstad	September 13, 1982			(United States) Harrisburg Senators (AA)
IF	40	Scott Thorman	January 6, 1982			(United States) Richmond Braves (AAA)
	29	Jimmy Van Ostrand	August 7, 1984			(United States) Salem Avalanche (A)
OF	19	Ryan Radmanovich	August 9, 1971			(United States) Somerset Patriots
OF	20	Michael Saunders	November 19, 1986			(United States) Tacoma Rainiers (AAA)
OF	7	Adam Stern	February 12, 1980			(United States) Norfolk Tides (AAA)
OF	33	Nick Weglarz	March 11, 1981			(United States) Kinston Indians (A+)

Pete Orr was originally named to the team, but pulled out when he was called up to the major league roster of the Washington Nationals. He was replaced by 22-year-old Emmanuel Garcia. Scott Richmond was also removed from the team when he was called up by the Toronto Blue Jays. Pitcher James Avery was named as a replacement.

== China ==
The roster for the China national baseball team was as follows:

- Manager: Jim Lefebvre
- Coaches: Steven Ontiveros (pitching coach), Yi Sheng

Pos.	No.	Player	Date of birth (age)	Bats	Throws	Club
P		Bu Tao	January 1, 1983			(China) Sichuan Dragons
P		Chen Junyi	August 26, 1981			(China) Guangdong Leopards
P		Chen Kun	March 5, 1980			(China) Sichuan Dragons
P		Guo Youhua	September 29, 1983			(China) Sichuan Dragons
P		Li Chenhao	July 2, 1977			(China) Beijing Tigers
P		Li Weiliang	September 2, 1980			(China) Beijing Tigers
P		Liu Kai	October 11, 1987			(United States) Gulf Coast Yankees
P		Lu Jiangang	February 19, 1979			(China) Tianjin Lions
P		Sun Guoqiang	August 11, 1974			(China) Jiangsu Hope Stars
P		Wang Nan	October 7, 1981			(China) Beijing Tigers
P		Xu Zheng	May 10, 1981			(China) Beijing Tigers
P		Zhang Li	February 3, 1980			(China) Shanghai Eagles
C		Wang Wei	December 25, 1978			(United States) Arizona League Mariners
C		Yang Yang	May 19, 1986			(China) Beijing Tigers
IF		Jia Yubing	February 18, 1983			(United States) Arizona League Mariners
IF		Zhang Yufeng	February 9, 1977			(China) Shanghai Eagles
IF		Sun Wei	September 11, 1976			(China) Beijing Tigers
IF		Hou Fenglian	July 11, 1980			(China) Tianjin Lions
IF		Jia Delong	July 4, 1985			(China) Guangdong Leopards
OF		Feng Fei	February 18, 1983			(China) Sichuan Dragons
OF		Li Lei	June 24, 1984			(China) Beijing Tigers
OF		Sun Lingfeng	August 14, 1978			(China) Beijing Tigers
OF		Wang Chao	March 23, 1985			(China) Tianjin Lions
OF		Zhang Hongbo	June 6, 1980			(China) Guangdong Leopards

== Chinese Taipei ==
The roster for the Chinese Taipei national baseball team was as follows:

- Manager: Hung I-Chung (La New Bears)
- Coaches: Hsieh Chang-Heng (Chinatrust Whales), Lu Ming-Tsu La New Bears), Kung Jung-Tang (National Training Team)

Pos.	No.	Player	Date of birth (age)	Bats	Throws	Club
P	12	Lee Cheng-Chang	October 21, 1986			(Taiwan) Taipei Physical Education College
P	17	Tsao Chin-Hui	June 2, 1981			MLB free agent
P	18	Pan Wei-Lun	March 5, 1982			(Taiwan) Uni-President Lions
P	19	Lo Chia-Jen	April 7, 1986			(Taiwan) Chinese Culture University
P	21	Chen Wei-Yin	June 12, 1985			(Japan) Chunichi Dragons
P	36	Ni Fu-Te	November 14, 1982			(Taiwan) Chinatrust Whales
P	46	Yang Chien-Fu	April 22, 1979			(Taiwan) Sinon Bulls
P	81	Hsu Wen-hsiung	December 5, 1978			(Taiwan) La New Bears
P	96	Cheng Kai-Wen	July 26, 1988			(Taiwan) Chinese Culture University
P	99	Chang Chih-Chia	May 6, 1980			(Taiwan) La New Bears
C	27	Yeh Chun-Chang	October 25, 1972			(Taiwan) Sinon Bulls
C	34	Kao Chih-kang	February 7, 1981			(Taiwan) Uni-President Lions
C	41	Chen Feng-Min	October 29, 1977			(Taiwan) La New Bears
IF	6	Shih Chih-wei	August 4, 1977			(Taiwan) La New Bears
IF	7	Kuo Yen-Wen	October 25, 1988			(United States) Gulf Coast Reds
IF	11	Chiang Chih-Hsien	February 21, 1988			(United States) Lancaster JetHawks (A+)
IF	23	Peng Cheng-Min	August 6, 1978			(Taiwan) Brother Elephants
IF	31	Lin Chih-Sheng	January 1, 1982			(Taiwan) La New Bears
IF	49	Chang Tai-Shan*	October 31, 1976			(Taiwan) Sinon Bulls
OF	24	Lin Che-Hsuan	September 21, 1988			(United States) Greenville Drive (A)
OF	28	Lo Kuo-Hui	September 26, 1985			(United States) High Desert Mavericks (A+)
OF	52	Chen Chin-feng	October 28, 1977			(Taiwan) La New Bears
OF	55	Pan Wu-hsiung	March 11, 1981			(Taiwan) Uni-President Lions
OF	66	Chang Chien-Ming	July 27, 1980			(Taiwan) Sinon Bulls

- On August 13, 2008, right before the Chinese Taipei vs. Netherlands match, Chang Tai-Shan was banned by the IBAF on showing up in the Olympic Games after he was tested positive for a banned substance. The Chinese Taipei National baseball team could only finish the Olympics with the remaining 23 players.

== Cuba ==
The roster for the Cuba national baseball team was as follows:

- Manager: Antonio Pacheco
- Coaches: Luis Jova, Jose Camacho, Pedro Perez, Francisco Escaurido

Pos.	No.	Player	Date of birth (age)	Bats	Throws	Club
P	99	Pedro Luis Lazo	April 15, 1973			(Cuba) Pinar del Río
P	42	Miguel Lahera	January 24, 1985			(Cuba) La Habana
P	45	Jonder Martínez	June 22, 1978			(Cuba) La Habana
P	64	Elier Sánchez	October 4, 1986			(Cuba) Camagüey
P	62	Yadier Pedroso	April 9, 1986			(Cuba) La Habana
P	23	Vicyohandri Odelín	June 26, 1980			(Cuba) Camagüey
P	16	Adiel Palma	August 20, 1970			(Cuba) Cienfuegos
P	32	Norberto González	October 10, 1979			(Cuba) Cienfuegos
P	20	Norge Luis Vera	October 3, 1971			Santiago de Cuba
P	74	Luis Miguel Rodríguez	June 3, 1973			(Cuba) Holguín
C	8	Ariel Pestano	January 31, 1974			(Cuba) Villa Clara
C	40	Rolando Meriño	February 17, 1971			Santiago de Cuba
C	5	Eriel Sánchez	April 12, 1975			(Cuba) Sancti Spíritus
IF	55	Alexander Mayeta	February 22, 1977			(Cuba) Industriales
IF	28	Héctor Olivera	April 5, 1985			Santiago de Cuba
IF	10	Yulieski Gourriel	June 9, 1984			(Cuba) Sancti Spíritus
IF	12	Michel Enríquez	February 11, 1979			(Cuba) Isla de la Juventud
IF	2	Eduardo Paret	October 23, 1972			(Cuba) Villa Clara
IF	3	Luis Miguel Navas	February 2, 1980			Santiago de Cuba
OF	1	Giorvis Duvergel	September 8, 1979			(Cuba) Guantánamo
OF	14	Yoandry Urgellés	July 28, 1981			(Cuba) Industriales
OF	88	Alexei Bell	October 2, 1983			Santiago de Cuba
OF	24	Frederich Cepeda	April 8, 1980			(Cuba) Sancti Spíritus
OF	54	Alfredo Despaigne	June 17, 1986			(Cuba) Granma

Yunieski Maya and Yulieski González were originally named, but were replaced with Miguel Lahera and Elier Sánchez.

== Japan ==
The roster for the Japan national baseball team was as follows:

- Manager: Senichi Hoshino
- Coaches: Kōichi Tabuchi, Koji Yamamoto, Yutaka Ohno

Pos.	No.	Player	Date of birth (age)	Bats	Throws	Club
P	19	Koji Uehara	April 3, 1975			(Japan) Yomiuri Giants
P	11	Kenshin Kawakami	June 22, 1975			(Japan) Chunichi Dragons
P	13	Hitoki Iwase	November 10, 1974			(Japan) Chunichi Dragons
P	28	Kyuji Fujikawa	July 21, 1980			(Japan) Hanshin Tigers
P	18	Yu Darvish	August 16, 1986			(Japan) Hokkaido Nippon Ham Fighters
P	17	Yoshihisa Naruse	October 13, 1985			(Japan) Chiba Lotte Marines
P	21	Tsuyoshi Wada	February 21, 1981			(Japan) Fukuoka SoftBank Hawks
P	47	Toshiya Sugiuchi	October 30, 1980			(Japan) Fukuoka SoftBank Hawks
P	15	Masahiro Tanaka	November 1, 1988			(Japan) Tohoku Rakuten Golden Eagles
P	16	Hideaki Wakui	June 21, 1986			(Japan) Saitama Seibu Lions
C	10	Shinnosuke Abe	March 20, 1979			(Japan) Yomiuri Giants
C	39	Akihiro Yano	December 6, 1968			(Japan) Hanshin Tigers
C	22	Tomoya Satozaki	May 20, 1976			(Japan) Chiba Lotte Marines
IF	2	Masahiro Araki	September 13, 1977			(Japan) Chunichi Dragons
IF	25	Takahiro Arai	January 30, 1977			(Japan) Hanshin Tigers
IF	55	Shuichi Murata	December 28, 1980			(Japan) Yokohama BayStars
IF	6	Shinya Miyamoto	November 5, 1970			(Japan) Tokyo Yakult Swallows
IF	7	Tsuyoshi Nishioka	July 27, 1984			(Japan) Chiba Lotte Marines
IF	52	Munenori Kawasaki	June 3, 1981			(Japan) Fukuoka SoftBank Hawks
IF	3	Hiroyuki Nakajima	July 31, 1982			(Japan) Saitama Seibu Lions
OF	31	Masahiko Morino	July 28, 1978			(Japan) Chunichi Dragons
OF	23	Norichika Aoki	January 5, 1982			(Japan) Tokyo Yakult Swallows
OF	41	Atsunori Inaba	August 3, 1972			(Japan) Hokkaido Nippon Ham Fighters
OF	46	Takahiko Sato	August 9, 1978			(Japan) Saitama Seibu Lions

== South Korea ==
The roster for the South Korea national baseball team was as follows:

- Manager: Kim Kyung-Moon (Doosan Bears)
- Coaches: Cho Kye-Hyun (Samsung Lions), Kim Gwang-Soo (Doosan Bears), Kim Ki-Tae (Yomiuri Giants)

Pos.	No.	Player	Date of birth (age)	Bats	Throws	Club
P	11	Oh Seung-Hwan	July 15, 1982			(South Korea) Samsung Lions
P	22	Han Ki-Joo	April 29, 1987			(South Korea) Kia Tigers
P	28	Yoon Suk-Min	July 24, 1986			(South Korea) Kia Tigers
P	91	Song Seung-Jun	June 29, 1980			(South Korea) Lotte Giants
P	51	Jung Keun Bong	July 15, 1980			(South Korea) LG Twins
P	17	Kim Kwang-Hyun	July 22, 1988			(South Korea) SK Wyverns
P	13	Jang Won-Sam	June 9, 1983			(South Korea) Woori Heroes
P	47	Kwon Hyuk	November 6, 1983			(South Korea) Samsung Lions
P	99	Ryu Hyun-Jin	March 25, 1987			(South Korea) Hanwha Eagles
P	21	Chong Tae-Hyon	November 10, 1978			(South Korea) SK Wyverns
C	20	Jin Kab-Yong	May 8, 1974			(South Korea) Samsung Lions
C	37	Kang Min-Ho	August 18, 1985			(South Korea) Lotte Giants
IF	10	Lee Dae-Ho	June 21, 1982			(South Korea) Lotte Giants
IF	25	Lee Seung-Yeop	August 18, 1976			(Japan) Yomiuri Giants
IF	3	Ko Young-Min	February 8, 1984			(South Korea) Doosan Bears
IF	8	Jeong Keun-Woo	October 2, 1982			(South Korea) SK Wyverns
IF	18	Kim Dong-Joo	February 3, 1976			(South Korea) Doosan Bears
IF	7	Park Jin-Man	November 30, 1976			(South Korea) Samsung Lions
IF	14	Kim Min-Jae	January 3, 1973			(South Korea) Hanwha Eagles
OF	35	Lee Jin-Young	June 15, 1980			(South Korea) SK Wyverns
OF	15	Lee Yong-Kyu	August 26, 1985			(South Korea) Kia Tigers
OF	29	Lee Taek-Keun	July 10, 1980			(South Korea) Woori Heroes
OF	50	Hyun-soo Kim	January 12, 1988			(South Korea) Doosan Bears
OF	39	Lee Jong-Wook	June 18, 1980			(South Korea) Doosan Bears

Im Tae-Hoon had been originally named, but was replaced with Yoon Suk-Min.

== Netherlands ==
The roster for the Netherlands national baseball team was as follows:

- Manager: Robert Eenhoorn
- Coaches: Brian Farley – Pitching coach, Wim Martinus – 1st base coach, Jack Hubbard – 3rd base coach, Paul van den Oever – Coach

Pos.	No.	Player	Date of birth (age)	Bats	Throws	Club
P	25	David Bergman	August 16, 1981			(Netherlands) Kinheim
P	44	Leon Boyd	August 30, 1983			(Netherlands) Neptunus
P	19	Rob Cordemans	October 31, 1974			(Netherlands) Sparta / Feyenoord
P	14	Dave Draijer	September 30, 1973			(Netherlands) Pioniers
P	13	Michiel van Kampen	January 23, 1976			(Netherlands) Kinheim
P	36	Diego Markwell	August 8, 1980			(Netherlands) Neptunus
P	39	Shairon Martis	March 30, 1987			(United States) Columbus Clippers (AAA)
P		Loek van Mil	September 15, 1984			(United States) Beloit Snappers (A)
P	31	Alexander Smit	October 2, 1985			(United States) Sarasota Reds (A+)
P	22	J. C. Sulbaran	November 9, 1989			(United States) American Heritage School
P	4	Pim Walsma	February 3, 1987			(Netherlands) Amsterdam Pirates
C	24	Sidney de Jong	April 14, 1979			(Netherlands) Amsterdam Pirates
C	38	Tjerk Smeets	June 3, 1980			(Netherlands) Kinheim
IF	12	Sharnol Adriana	November 13, 1970			(Mexico) Rojos del Águila de Veracruz
IF	2	Yurendell de Caster	September 26, 1979			(United States) Columbus Clippers (AAA)
IF	8	Michael Duursma	February 26, 1978			(Netherlands) Pioniers
IF	26	Percy Isenia	December 25, 1976			(Netherlands) Sparta / Feyenoord
IF	9	Roel Koolen	April 20, 1982			(Netherlands) Kinheim
IF	30	Raily Legito	July 26, 1978			(Netherlands) Neptunus
IF	5	Jeroen Sluijter	April 2, 1975			(Netherlands) Neptunus
OF	37	Bryan Engelhardt	January 10, 1982			(Netherlands) Kinheim
OF	21	Gene Kingsale	August 20, 1976			(Netherlands) Neptunus
OF	18	Dirk van 't Klooster	April 23, 1976			(Netherlands) Kinheim
OF	29	Martijn Meeuwis	July 14, 1982			(Netherlands) Neptunus
OF	27	Danny Rombley	November 26, 1979			(Netherlands) Kinheim

van Mil traveled with the team to Beijing but suffered an injury during training. He was replaced by Dave Draijer.

== United States ==
The roster for the United States national baseball team was as follows:

- General Manager: Bob Watson
- Manager: Davey Johnson
- Coaches: Rick Eckstein, Reggie Smith, Marcel Lachemann

Pos.	No.	Player	Date of birth (age)	Bats	Throws	Club
P	40	Brett Anderson	February 1, 1988			(United States) Midland RockHounds (AA)
P	34	Jake Arrieta	March 6, 1986			(United States) Frederick Keys (A)
IF	18	Brian Barden	April 2, 1981			(United States) Memphis Redbirds (AAA)
IF	17	Matthew Brown	August 8, 1982			(United States) Salt Lake Bees (AAA)
P	30	Trevor Cahill	March 1, 1988			(United States) Midland RockHounds (AA)
P	47	Jeremy Cummings	November 7, 1976			(United States) Durham Bulls (AAA)
IF	2	Jason Donald	September 4, 1984			(United States) Reading Phillies (AA)
P	45	Brian Duensing	February 22, 1983			(United States) Rochester Red Wings (AAA)
OF	24	Dexter Fowler	March 22, 1986			(United States) Tulsa Drillers (AA)
OF	7	John Gall	April 2, 1978			(United States) Albuquerque Isotopes (AAA)
IF	10	Mike Hessman	March 5, 1978			(United States) Toledo Mud Hens (AAA)
P	39	Kevin Jepsen	July 26, 1984			(United States) Salt Lake Bees (AAA)
P	15	Brandon Knight	October 1, 1975			(United States) New Orleans Zephyrs (AAA)
P	21	Mike Koplove	August 30, 1976			(United States) Las Vegas 51s (AAA)
OF	44	Matt LaPorta	January 8, 1985			(United States) Akron Aeros (AA)
C	6	Lou Marson	June 26, 1986			(United States) Reading Phillies (AA)
P	49	Blaine Neal	April 6, 1978			(United States) Toledo Mud Hens (AAA)
IF	3	Jayson Nix	August 26, 1982			(United States) Colorado Springs Sky Sox (AAA)
OF	14	Nate Schierholtz	February 15, 1984			(United States) Fresno Grizzlies (AAA)
P	37	Jeff Stevens	September 5, 1983			(United States) Buffalo Bisons (AAA)
P	29	Stephen Strasburg	July 20, 1988			(United States) San Diego State University
C	19	Taylor Teagarden	December 21, 1983			(United States) Oklahoma RedHawks (AAA)
IF	26	Terry Tiffee	April 21, 1979			(United States) Las Vegas 51s (AAA)
P	35	Casey Weathers	June 10, 1985			(United States) Tulsa Drillers (AA)
