= 2011 China Baseball League season =

The 2011 China Baseball League season saw the Tianjin Lions defeat the Guangdong Leopards in 3 games to 1 to win the Championship Series.

== Standings ==
=== Southeast Division ===
As of May 11

Southeast Division	W	L
Tianjin Lions	14	4
Beijing Tigers	8	10
Sichuan Dragons	9	9

=== Southwest Division ===
As of May 11

Southwest Division	W	L
Shanghai Golden Eagles	3	15
Guangdong Leopards	12	6
Jiangsu Hopestars	10	8
Henan Elephants	7	11

== Awards ==
Award	Player	Team
The best pitcher award	Su Changlong	Tianjin Lions
The best hits hand award	Fei Feng	Sichuan Dragons
The stolen bases award	Li Lei	Beijing Tigers
The best score award	Li Lei	Beijing Tigers
The best rookie award	Li Xin	Tianjin Lions
Most Valuable Player	Yang Guogang	Tianjin Lions
