= Vladimir García =

Cuban baseball player (born 1982)

Tigres de Ciego de Ávila
- Pitcher
- Born: July 4, 1982 (age 44); Ciego de Ávila, Cuba
- Bats: Right Throws: Right
- Stats at Baseball Reference
Medals
Men's baseball
Representing Cuba
Central American and Caribbean Games
Silver medal – second place	2018 Barranquilla	Team

Vladimir García Escalante (born July 4, 1982) is a Cuban professional baseball pitcher for Ciego de Ávila of the Cuban National Series. He has also played for the Cuba national baseball team. His fastball has peaked at 94 miles per hour (151 km/h).

== Career ==
García debuted for Ciego de Ávila in 2005-2006, going 3–5 with 5 saves and a 6.04 earned run average (ERA) at age 17. He played for Cuba in the 2006 World Junior Championships. In 2006-2007, he improved to 4–5, 1.68 with 14 saves (tied for the Serie Nacional lead) and did not give up a home run in 53 2/3 innings pitched (IP).

García went 7–5 with 10 saves and a 3.07 ERA in 2007-2008, led the league with 16 intentional walks and almost made Cuba's team for the 2008 Olympics. He had a 0.75 ERA and 10 saves early in the 2008–2009 season and was put on Cuba's roster for the 2009 World Baseball Classic. In his national team debut during the Classic, he allowed two runs in 2 2/3 IP. He allowed the only South African run in Cuba's 8–1 win. Called on in the 9th to close off a shutout, he gave up a hit to Anthony Phillips. Martin Gordon hit into a force and took second on a wild pitch. Jonathan Phillips then singled home the run.

García tied the Cuban save record in 2008-2009 with 25. He was 4–3 with a 1.63 ERA, giving up only 42 hits in 72 innings while fanning 71. He had six more saves than runner-up Yolexis Ulacia and was named the All-Star relief pitcher.

García tossed five shutout innings, fanning seven, in the 2009 World Port Tournament; he saved one game.

García became a starter in 2009-2010 and made the transition very well, going 11–4 with a 2.68 ERA and .220 opponent average. He fanned 115 in 114 innings. He led the league in strikeouts (9 ahead of runner-up Odrisamer Despaigne) and wins (tied with Yulieski González, Norberto González and Maikel Folch). He was tied for third in wild pitches (11) and was 4th in ERA behind Angel Peña, Yulieski González and Jonder Martinez.

=== Quebec Capitales ===
Garcia signed with the Quebec Capitales of the Can-Am League in June 2019. He was released on July 19, 2019.

== Sources ==
- Baseballdecuba.com
- World Baseball Classic he made his debut in 2006 at age 17 despite being born in 1982!
