= Luis Molina =

Luis Molina may refer to:

- Luis de Molina (1535–1600), Spanish Jesuit priest and theologian
- Luis Adán Molina (1861–1952), Chilean mining engineer and politician
- Luis Molina (boxer) (1938–2013), American boxer
- Luis Molina (rugby union) (born 1959), Argentine rugby union player
- Luis Manuel Molina (born 1959), Cuban musician, composer and broadcaster
- Luis Molina (baseball) (born 1974), Nicaraguan baseball coach
- Luis Pedro Molina (born 1977), Guatemalan football goalkeeper
- Luis Molina (athlete) (born 1988), Argentine athlete
- Louis Molina (born 1972), New York City Corrections Commissioner
