= Guoqiang =

- Traditional Chinese: 國強
- Simplified Chinese: 国强
- Cantonese Yale: Gwok-kèuhng
- Hanyu Pinyin: Guóqiáng
Transcriptions
Standard Mandarin
- Hanyu Pinyin: Guóqiáng
Yue: Cantonese
- Yale Romanization: Gwok-kèuhng

Guoqiang is the Mandarin Pinyin spelling of a Chinese male given name meaning "strong country". The same name is also spelled Kuo-chiang in Mandarin Wade-Giles (used in Taiwan) and Kwok-keung in Cantonese pronunciation.

People with this name include:

- Cai Guo-Qiang (born 1957), Chinese artist
- Chan Kwok-keung (born 1946), Hong Kong politician
- He Guoqiang (born 1943), Chinese politician
- Sham Kwok Keung (born 1985), Hong Kong international footballer
- Sun Guoqiang (born 1974), Chinese baseball player
- Tang Guoqiang (born 1952), Chinese actor
- Yang Guoqiang (born 1954), Chinese entrepreneur, founder of Country Garden Group
- Rimsky Yuen Kwok-keung (born 1964), Hong Kong lawyer
- Zeng Guoqiang (born 1965), Chinese weightlifter
- Zhang Guoqiang (born 1969), Chinese actor

== See also ==
- Chinese given name
