= Arquimedes =

Arquimedes (also Arquímedes) is a given name. Notable people with the name include:

- Arquímedes Arrieta (born 1918), Uruguayan boxer who competed in the 1936 Summer Olympics
- Arquimedes Caminero (born 1987), Dominican baseball pitcher
- Arquímedes Figuera (born 1989), Venezuelan footballer
- Arquímedes Herrera (1935–2013), Venezuelan track and field athlete
- Arquimedes Nieto (born 1989) Panamanian baseball player
- Arquimedes Reyes (born 1981), Salvadoran singer

== See also ==
- Archimedes
- Arquimedes, a computer-aided design (CAD) program
- Arquimedez Pozo (born 1973), Dominican professional baseball player
