= Chunhua (disambiguation) =

Chunhua may refer to:

== Places ==
- Chunhua County (淳化县), Shaanxi
- Chunhua, Changsha County (春华镇), town in Hunan

== People ==
- Dong Chunhua (1990–; 董春华), baseball catcher for the Shanghai Eagles
- Hu Chunhua (1963–; 胡春华), Chinese Communist Party Committee Secretary for Inner Mongolia
- Jia Chunhua (1968–; 贾春华), a former football player for Shanghai East Asia FC
- Zhang Chunhua (189–247 CE; 張春華), wife of the general Sima Yi
