= Weiliang =

Weiliang is a Chinese given name. Notable people with the name include:

- Li Weiliang (born 1980), Chinese baseball player
- Lu "fiy100%" weiliang, known as Fly100%, Chinese professional esports player
- Wang Weiliang (born 1987), Singaporean comedian, host, actor, singer and businessman
- Yu Weiliang (born 1973), Chinese footballer
- Zhou Weiliang (1911–1995), Chinese-American mathematician and stamp collector
