= Yolexis Ulacia =

Cuban baseball player

- Pitcher
- Born: 6 August 1977 (age 49); Trinidad, Sancti Spíritus Province, Cuba
- Bats: Right Throws: Right

Teams
- Sancti Spíritus (1998–2000); Villa Clara (2001–2012)

Yolexis Ulacia Carrazana (born 6 August 1977) is a Cuban former baseball relief pitcher. Ulacia played 13 seasons in the Cuban National Series and represented Cuba at the 2009 World Baseball Classic.

== Career ==
Ulacia was born on 6 August 1977 in Trinidad, Sancti Spíritus Province. He made his Cuban National Series debut in 1988 playing for Sancti Spíritus. In 2001, he joined Villa Clara, where he played until his retirement in 2012.

After nine seasons in the Cuban leagues (through the 2007-2008 campaign), he had gone 50-38 with 68 saves and a 3.24 earned run average (ERA) in 334 games for Villa Clara.

Ulacia was the winning pitcher in the Cuban Serie Nacional All-Star Game in both 2003 and 2004. In the winter of 2003-04, he led all pitchers with 45 games pitched. He led again in that department with 42 appearances in 2004-05 and 39 in 2006-2007.

After 26 games in 2008-2009, he had 17 saves and made the Cuban roster for the 2009 World Baseball Classic. In the Classic, Ulacia saved one game and allowed one run in one inning. The run came on a hits by Munenori Kawasaki and Shuichi Murata surrounding a bunt by Norichika Aoki.

Ulacia was 4-3 with 19 saves and a 2.77 ERA in 2008-2009, walking only 9 in 52 innings. He was second in saves behind Vladimir García.
