= Zhang Fujia =

Chinese baseball player (born 1982)

Zhang Fujia (simplified Chinese: 张伏佳; traditional Chinese: 張伏佳; pinyin: Zhāng Fújia; born 15 August 1982 in Henan) is a Chinese baseball infielder for the Sichuan Dragons. He was a member of the China national baseball team competing in the 2009 World Baseball Classic.
