= Pedro Pérez (baseball) =

Cuban baseball coach (1936–2022)

- Pitcher / Coach
- Born: 2 September 1936; Caibarién, Santa Clara Province, Cuba
- Died: 7 December 2022 (aged 86); Santa Clara, Villa Clara Province, Cuba
- Batted: Right Threw: Right

Teams
- Almendares (1958–1959)

Pedro Pérez Delgado (2 September 1936–7 December 2022) was a Cuban professional baseball pitcher and coach. Pérez played one season in the Cuban League and later spent six seasons in the minor leagues before returning to Cuba, where he worked as a coach and served as the pitching coach of the Cuba national baseball team for 35 years.

== Playing career ==
Pérez was born on 2 September 1936 in Caibarién, Santa Clara Province (current Villa Clara Province). In 1957, he moved to the United States after being scouted by Connie Marrero and was signed by the Milwaukee Braves organization. He played for the Wellsville Braves in 1957 and 1958.

He made his professional debut in the Cuban League during the 1958–59 season playing for Almendares; he appeared in three games.

In 1959, he joined the Washington Senators organization and was assigned to the Sanford Greyhounds. In 1960, he signed with the Boston Red Sox organization, playing for the Waterloo Hawks in 1960 and the Johnstown Red Sox in 1961. Over the course of his minor league career in the United States, he appeared in 89 games and compiled a 32–30 record.

After the Cuban Revolution, Pérez was given the option to remain in the United States or return to Cuba; he chose to go back to his home country.

== Coaching career ==
Pérez returned to Cuba and worked as a coach, beginning in his native Caibarién with youth teams. In 1971, he joined the Cuba national baseball team as pitching coach under manager Servio Borges. As a member of the Cuban team, he attended five Summer Olympics, the 2006 World Baseball Classic, thirteen Baseball World Cups, and seven Pan American Games, winning medals in every competition.

He also spent 30 seasons as pitching coach of Villa Clara and coached the Piratas de Campeche of the Mexican Baseball League.

== Death ==
Pérez had been hospitalized since September 2022 at the Arnaldo Milián Hospital in Santa Clara, where he was recovering from an ischemic stroke and also suffered from pneumonia. He died there on 7 December 2022, aged 86.
