= Alessio Angelucci =

South African baseball player (born 1988)

Piacenza Baseball
- Pitcher
- Born: July 28, 1988 (age 37); Johannesburg, South Africa
- Bats: Right Throws: Right
- Stats at Baseball Reference

Alessio Dante Angelucci (born July 28, 1988) is a South African professional baseball pitcher in the San Diego Padres organization and the South Africa national baseball team. He began his professional career in 2008 with the Arizona League Padres. In 2009 and 2010, he pitched again with the Arizona League Padres and with the Eugene Emeralds. He pitched for South Africa at the 2009 World Baseball Classic.

Alessio is currently represented by Platinum Sports and Entertainment.
