= Yeliar Castro =

Panamanian baseball player (born 1987)

- Relief pitcher
- Born: December 3, 1987 (age 38); Panama City, Panama
- Bats: Right Throws: Right
- Stats at Baseball Reference

Yeliar Elias Castro (born December 3, 1987) is a Panamanian professional baseball infielder who played in Minor League Baseball for the Atlanta Braves organization and also played for Panama in the 2009 World Baseball Classic.

== Minor league career ==
Castro was signed by the Atlanta Braves in 2004, and began his professional career in 2005 with the GCL Braves. He went 0-2 with a 9.82 ERA that season. In 2006, he again pitched for the GCL Braves, improving to 1-2 with a 5.32 ERA. He split the 2007 season between the Danville Braves and GCL Braves, going a combined 2-2 with a 3.82 ERA. In 2008, he pitched for the Rome Braves, going 5-6 with a 4.98 ERA. He began 2009 with Rome as well.

== World Baseball Classic ==
In the 2009 World Baseball Classic, Castro appeared in one game, allowing three earned runs in two innings of work. All three runs came off of a home runs Miguel Olivo.
