= Xia Kangnan =

Chinese baseball player

Xia Kangnan (Chinese: 夏康男; pinyin: Xià Kāngnán; born 13 July 1988 in Zhejiang) is a Chinese baseball pitcher for the Shanghai Eagles. He was a member of the China national baseball team in the 2009 World Baseball Classic.
