= Eliecer Navarro =

Panamanian baseball player (born 1987)

- Pitcher
- Born: October 26, 1987 (age 38); David, Chiriquí, Panama
- Bats: Left Throws: Left
- Stats at Baseball Reference

Eliecer Navarro (born October 26, 1987) is a Panamanian former professional baseball pitcher who played in the Pittsburgh Pirates organization. He pitched for Panama in the 2009 World Baseball Classic.

== Minor league career ==
Navarro began his professional career with the Dominican Summer Pirates, in the Pittsburgh Pirates organization, in 2007. With them, he went 8–2 with a 2.83 ERA in 14 games (13 starts), striking out 85 batters in 70 innings of work. In 2008, he went 4–3 with a 1.42 ERA in 15 starts, striking out 108 batters in 76 innings. He went 4–2 with a 3.77 ERA in 10 games (three starts) for the rookie-level Gulf Coast League Pirates in 2009 and in 2010, he went 2–2 with a 3.12 ERA in 19 games (six starts) for the State College Spikes and West Virginia Power. The Pirates released Navarro in March 2014.

== World Baseball Classic ==
In the 2009 World Baseball Classic, Navarro appeared in one game, pitching 1 1/3 innings of work. He allowed two hits, two runs (one of which was unearned), posting a 6.75 ERA.
