= Concepcion Rodriguez =

Panamanian baseball player

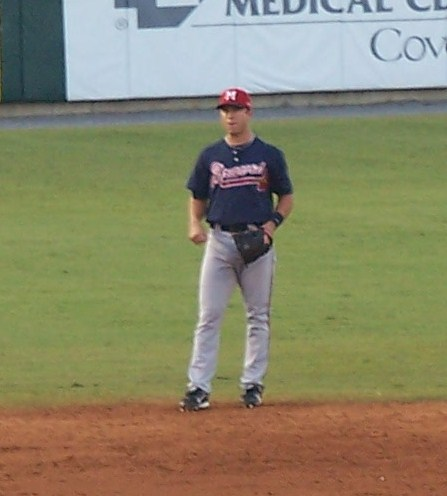
- Rodriguez with the Mississippi Braves in 2009
- Outfielder
- Born: September 19, 1986 (age 39); Chepo, Panama
- Bats: Right Throws: Right
- Stats at Baseball Reference

Concepción Rodríguez (born September 19, 1986) is a Panamanian professional baseball player. He is named after Dave Concepción.

Rodríguez was a member of the Panama national baseball team at the 2009 World Baseball Classic and 2019 Pan American Games Qualifier.
