= Bu Tao =

Chinese baseball player (born 1983)

Bu Tao 卜 涛
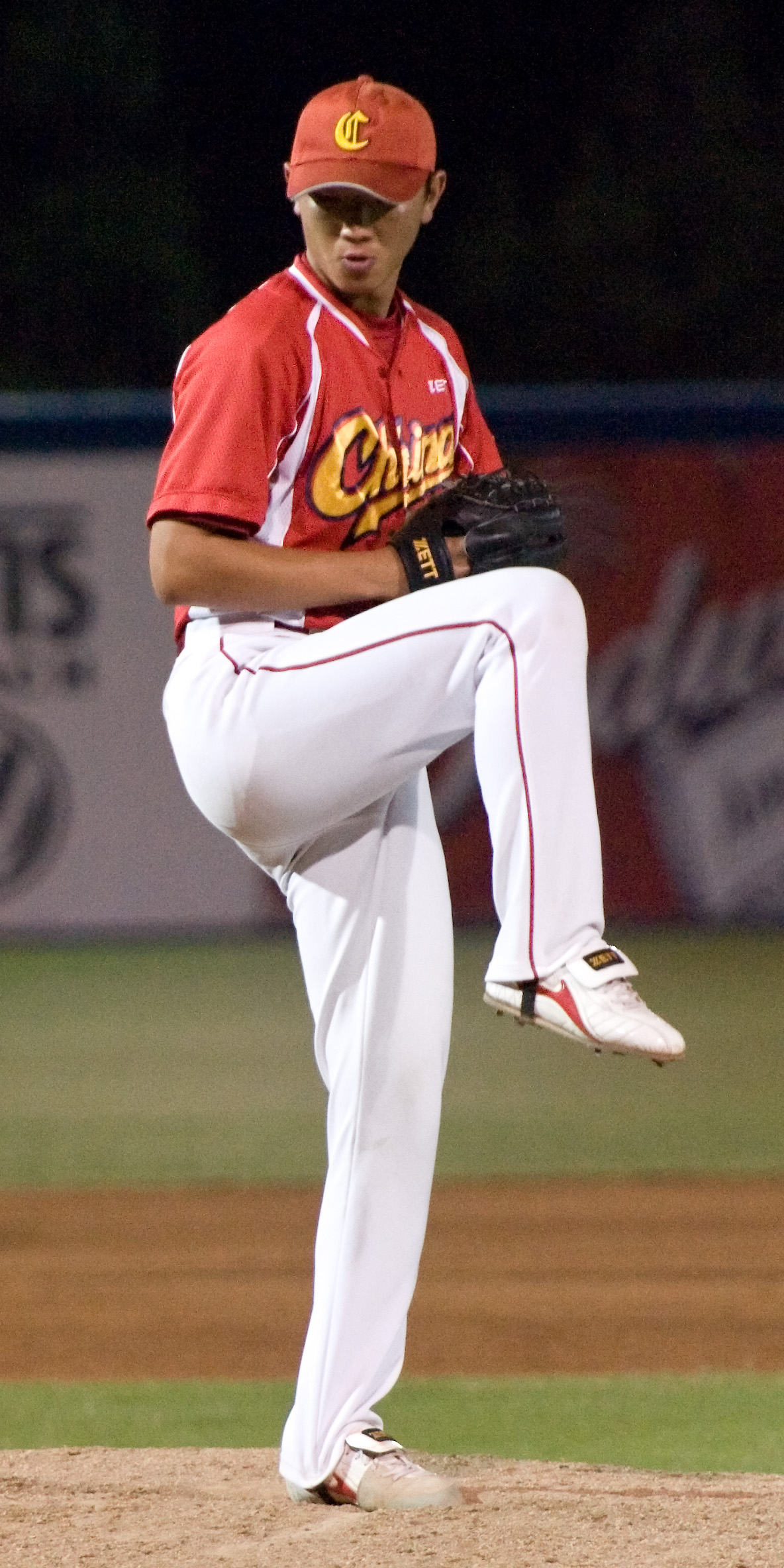
- Bu with the China national baseball team in 2008
- Pitcher
- Born: January 15, 1983 (age 43); Xi'an, Shaanxi, China
- Bats: Left Throws: Left

Teams
- Jiangsu Hopestars (2006); Sichuan Dragons (2007)

Bu Tao, (simplified Chinese: 卜涛; traditional Chinese: 卜濤; pinyin: Bǔ Tāo; born 15 January 1983) is a left-handed pitcher for the Chinese national baseball team.

He competed in the 2006, 2009 and 2013 World Baseball Classic representing China. His number is 68. Tao has also been selected to represent China in baseball at the 2008 Summer Olympics.
