= Cristhian Presichi =

Mexican baseball player

- Outfielder
- Born: July 28, 1980 (age 45); Mexicali, Baja California, Mexico
- Bats: Right Throws: Right
- Stats at Baseball Reference

Cristhian Presichi Mendoza (born July 28, 1980) is a Mexican former professional baseball outfielder.

== Career ==
In the 2009 World Baseball Classic edition, he was selected to Team Mexico in place of the injured Alfredo Amézaga. He had one hit in six at bats, that hit being a long home run over the Cuban veteran pitcher Pedro Luis Lazo.

On April 5, 2011, Presichi signed with the Saraperos de Saltillo of the Mexican League. On May 18, 2011, he was assigned to the Acereros de Monclova. On April 19, 2012, the Acereros traded Presichi to the Olmecas de Tabasco for Omar De La Torre. On March 22, 2013, Presichi was assigned to the Broncos de Reynosa. On July 14, 2016, Presichi was traded to the Rieleros de Aguascalientes. He was released by the Rieleros on June 20, 2019. On June 29, 2019, Presichi signed with the Algodoneros de Unión Laguna. Presichi did not play in a game in 2020 due to the cancellation of the Mexican League season because of the COVID-19 pandemic. On November 23, 2020, Presichi was released by the Algodoneros.
