= Angel Cuan =

Panamanian baseball player (born 1989)

Ángel Cuán

Free agent
- Pitcher
- Born: May 29, 1989 (age 37); Panama City, Panama
- Bats: Left Throws: Left
- Stats at Baseball Reference

Ángel Antonio Cuán Hernández (born May 29, 1989) is a Panamanian minor league baseball pitcher who is a free agent. He has also played for Panama in international competition, including the 2009 World Baseball Classic.

== Minor league baseball ==
He began his professional career in 2008 with the Venezuelan Summer League Mets, going 1–8 with a 3.12 ERA in 14 games started. In 72 innings, he had 74 strikeouts. Cuan began the 2009 season with the Brooklyn Cyclones and also pitched for the Kingsport Mets, going 1–5 with a 5.05 ERA in 14 games (13 starts) that year. In 2010, he pitched for the Cyclones and St. Lucie Mets, going a combined 5–1 with a 1.93 ERA in 17 games (14 starts).

== International competition ==
He had a 4.05 ERA in three relief appearances in the 2008 Americas Baseball Cup. He appeared in one game in the 2009 World Baseball Classic, posting a 27.00 in 1/3 inning of work.
