= Nobuhiro Takashiro =

Japanese baseball player and coach (1954–2025)

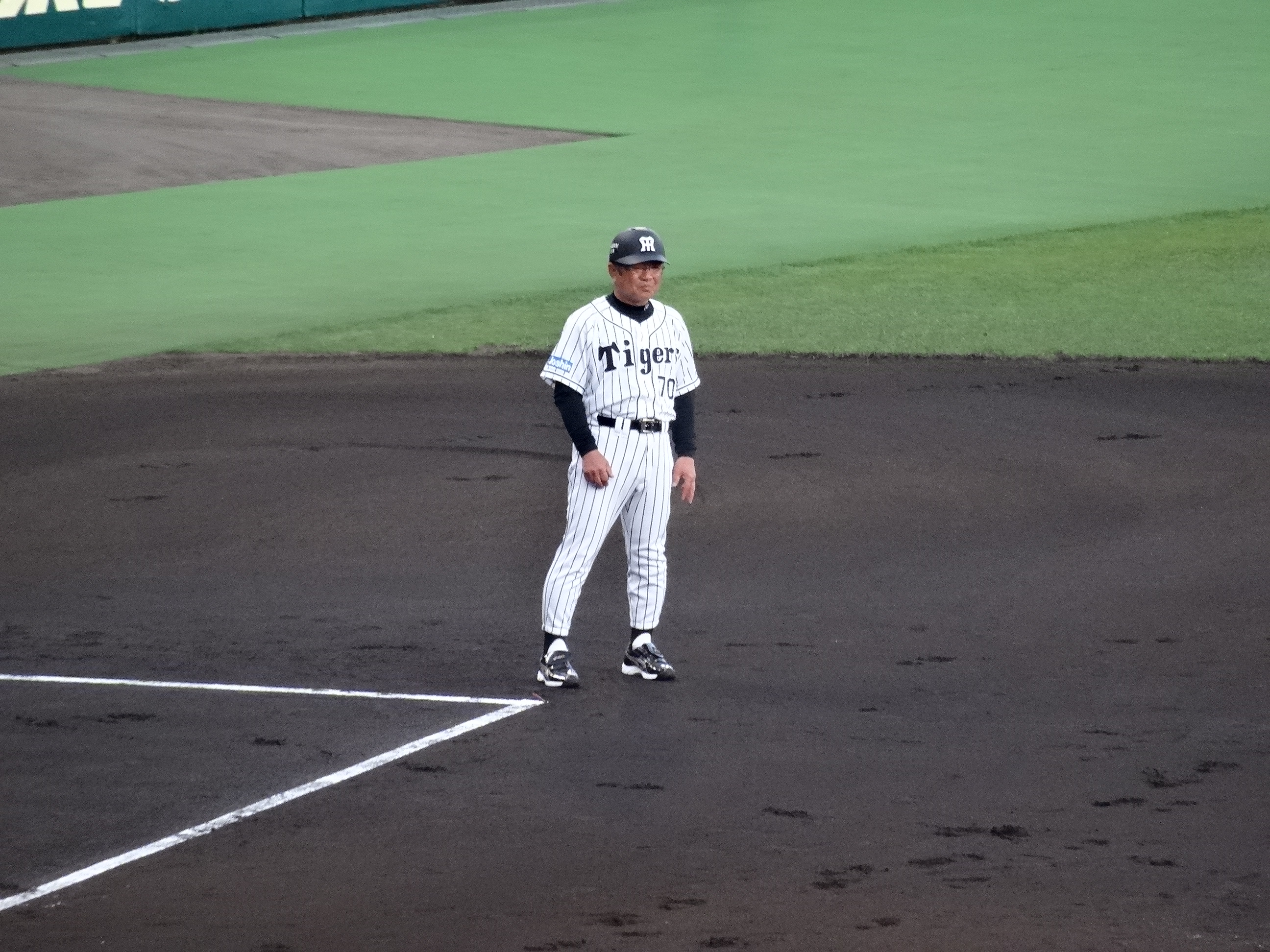
- Infielder
- Born: 27 May 1954; Shimoichi, Nara, Japan
- Died: 9 December 2025 (aged 71); Osaka, Japan
- Batted: Right Threw: Right

NPB debut
- April 7, 1979, for the Nippon-Ham Fighters

Last NPB appearance
- October 18, 1989, for the Hiroshima Toyo Carp

NPB statistics (through 1989)
- Batting average: .256
- Home runs: 57
- Hits: 772
- Stats at Baseball Reference

Teams
- As player: Nippon-Ham Fighters (1979–1988); Hiroshima Toyo Carp (1989); As coach: Hiroshima Toyo Carp (1990–1998); Chunichi Dragons (1999–2001, 2004–2008); Nippon-Ham Fighters (2002); Chiba Lotte Marines (2003); Hanwha Eagles (2010); Orix Buffaloes (2011–2012); Hanshin Tigers (2014–2020)

Career highlights and awards
- 3× NPB All-Star (1979, 1980, 1983); Best Nine Award (1980); Diamond Glove Award (1979)

Nobuhiro Takashiro (高代 延博, Takashiro Nobuhiro; 27 May 1954 – 9 December 2025) was a Japanese Nippon Professional Baseball infielder.

Takashiro died from esophageal cancer in Osaka, on 9 December 2025, at the age of 71.
