= Yi Sheng =

Chinese baseball coach (born 1972)

- Coach
- Born: June 13, 1972 (age 53); Beijing, China
- Bats: Right Throws: Right

Yi Sheng (born June 13, 1972, in Beijing, China) is an official of the Chinese Baseball Association. He coached the China national baseball team in the World Baseball Classics in 2013 and 2017, as well as the 2002 Asia Games, 2005 Asian Baseball Championship, 2010 Asian Games, and 2008 Olympics.

He has also coached for the Beijing Tigers.
