= Kevin Ramos =

Panamanian baseball player (born 1986)

Kevin Wigberto Ramos Caballero (born June 6, 1986 in Panama City) is a minor league baseball infielder who also played for Panama in the 2009 World Baseball Classic.

Prior to playing professionally, he attended Union College and Middle Georgia College. He hit .407 with 71 RBI for Union College in 2008 and set a school single-season record with 98 hits.

== Minor league career ==
Ramos began his minor league career in 2008, playing in the Los Angeles Angels system. For the AZL Angels, he hit .319 in 40 games in 2008.

He played for the Orem Owls, Rancho Cucamonga Quakes (one game) and Arkansas Travelers in 2009, hitting a combined .399 with two home runs and 30 RBI. In 2010, he played of the Cedar Rapids Kernels, Quakes and Travelers, hitting a combined .211 with 17 RBI in 84 games.

== 2009 World Baseball Classic ==
He appeared in one game for Panama, although he did get an at-bat.
