= Wang Aiping (baseball) =

Chinese baseball coach

Wang Aiping (born 18 March 1972) is a Chinese baseball coach who is known for coaching the China national baseball team in the 2008 Olympic Games and the 2009 World Baseball Classic. He has also served as a coach for the Guangdong Leopards.

== Early life ==
Wang Aiping was born 18 March 1972 in Lanzhou City, Gansu Province, China. From 1978 to 1986, he attended primary and secondary school, where he learned to play baseball in Lanzhou City, Yuzhong County at Gansu Province. Wang became a member of a baseball team in Lanzhou City from 1987 to 1994.

In 1995, he became a member of a baseball team in Guangdong Province, where he played until 2001. He then became an assistant coach for the baseball team, a role he held until 2005. He was the head coach of the Chinese National baseball team from 2006 to 2009. In March 2010, Aiping became a softball coach in Guangdong Province, a role he still holds.

== Baseball career achievements ==
=== 1997 ===
- Third place on 8th National Games.

=== 1998 - 2001 ===
- Third place on National Championship.

=== 2001 ===
- Second place on 9th National Games.

=== 2003 ===
- First place on National Championship.

=== 2005 ===
- Fifth place on 10th National Games.

=== 2008 ===
- 8th place on 2008 Beijing Olympic Games.

=== 2009 ===
- Participated in the Baseball World Series held in Japan.

== Softball career achievements ==
=== 2010 ===
- 2nd place on National Championship when he was appointed as a main coach. 1st place on National Championship.

=== 2011 ===
- 3rd place on National Championship.
