= Chris Cooper (baseball) =

American baseball player (1978–2023)

San Marino Baseball Club
- Pitcher
- Born: October 31, 1978; Pittsburgh, Pennsylvania, United States
- Died: March 12, 2023 (aged 44); Las Vegas, Nevada, United States
- Batted: Left Threw: Left
- Stats at Baseball Reference
Medals
Men's baseball
Representing Italy
European Baseball Championship
Gold medal – first place	2010 Germany	National team

Christopher Daniel Cooper (October 31, 1978 – March 12, 2023) was an American professional baseball pitcher.

Cooper was drafted by the Cleveland Indians in the 35th round of the 2001 MLB draft out of the University of New Mexico. He remained in the Mets farm system through 2006 and spent 2007 in the Atlantic League of Professional Baseball before going to Italy.

Being of Italian descent, he played for the Italy national baseball team in the 2009 World Baseball Classic and 2013 World Baseball Classic.

Cooper died of a heart attack on March 12, 2023, at the age of 44.
