= Avelino Asprilla =

Panamanian baseball player (born 1981)

- Infielder
- Born: January 1, 1981 (age 45); Calidonia, Panama
- Bats: Right Throws: Right
- Stats at Baseball Reference

Avelino Asprilla Padilla (born January 1, 1981) is a Panamanian former professional baseball infielder. He played for Panama in multiple international baseball events, including the 2009 World Baseball Classic.

== Career ==
Asprilla played professionally in the minor leagues from 1999 to 2006 in the Pittsburgh Pirates and Philadelphia Phillies organizations. He began his professional career in 1999 for the VSL Pirates, hitting .337 with 30 stolen bases. That year, Asprilla led the league in triples, with five.

In 2000, Asprilla played for the DSL Pirates, hitting .336 with 37 stolen bases. With the Williamsport Crosscutters in 2001, Asprilla's average dropped to .257, and he stole only nine bases in 56 games. He split the 2002 season between three teams - the Crosscutters, the Hickory Crawdads and the Lynchburg Hillcats - hitting a combined .238 with six home runs and seven stolen bases in 85 games.

Asprilla split the 2001 season between three teams as well - the Crawdads, the Hillcats and the Gulf Coast League Pirates - hitting .277 with four stolen bases in 52 games, combined. He spent 2004 and 2005 with Lynchburg, hitting .283 with six stolen bases in 121 games in 2004 and .269 with four stolen bases and 12 home runs in 112 games in 2005.

Asprilla signed with the Philadelphia Phillies following the 2005 season, and he spent 2006 with two of their minor league affiliates - the Lakewood BlueClaws and Clearwater Threshers. That season, he hit a combined .247 with 12 stolen bases (his highest total since 2000) in 113 games. 2006 was Asprilla's final season in minor league baseball.

== International career ==
Avelino Asprilla
Medal record

Representing Panama

Men's Baseball

Baseball World Cup
Silver medal – second place	2003 Havana	Team

Asprilla played in the 2003 Baseball World Cup, hitting .268 with nine runs in ten games played. In the 2007 Pan American Games, Asprilla went four for 11 with two RBI, and in the 2007 Baseball World Cup he went two for 13. In the 2008 Americas Baseball Cup, Asprilla hit .235. He appeared in two games in the 2009 World Baseball Classic, although he did not get any at-bats.
