= Peter Ciofrone =

American baseball player (1983)

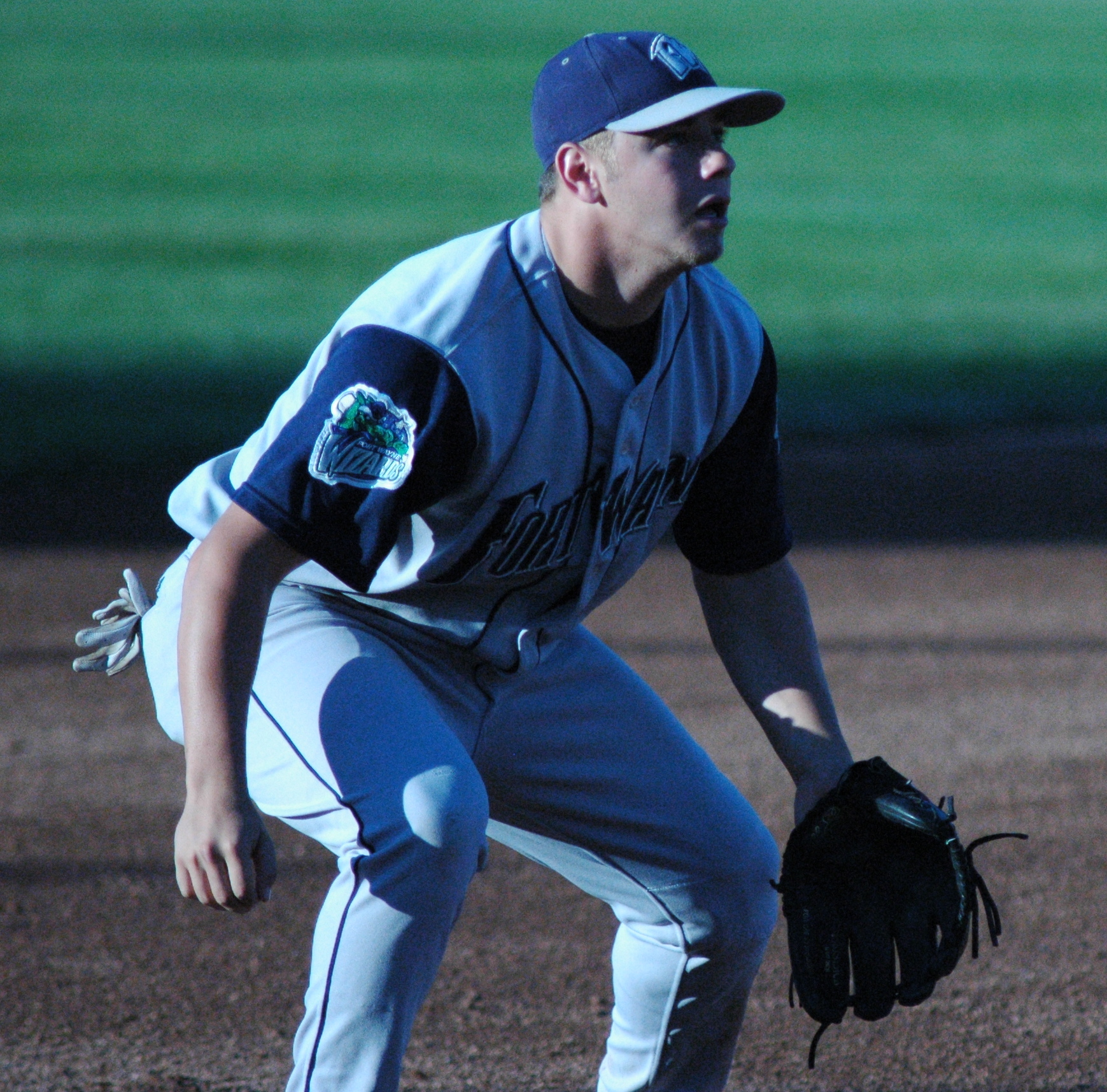
- Ciofrone with the Fort Wayne Wizards in 2005
- Outfielder
- Born: September 28, 1983 (age 42); Nesconset, New York, U.S.
- Bats: Left Throws: Right

Peter James Ciofrone (born September 28, 1983) is an American professional baseball player. An outfielder, Ciofrone played in minor league baseball.

== Career ==
Ciofrone attended Smithtown High School. The Boston Red Sox selected him in the 16th round of the 2002 Major League Baseball draft. The Red Sox traded Ciofrone to the San Diego Padres in 2004.

Ciofrone participated in the 2009 World Baseball Classic as a member of the Italian national baseball team. He was eligible to play for Italy due to his Italian ancestry.

== Personal ==
Ciofrone is from Long Island, New York. He has two older brothers.
