= Abraham Atencio =

Panamanian baseball player (born 1977)

Medal record

Representing Panama

Men's Baseball

Baseball World Cup
Bronze medal – third place	2005 Rotterdam	Team

Abraham Atencio Castillo (born February 16, 1977) is a baseball pitcher who has played for the Panama national baseball team.

In the 2005 Baseball World Cup, Atencio had a 2.20 ERA in 12 1/3 innings of work. He played in the 2006 Central American and Caribbean Games, allowing one earned run in 6 2/3 innings of work. In the 2006 COPABE qualifier for the 2008 Olympics, he allowed 14 baserunners in five innings of work. He allowed two runs in six innings in his only appearance in the 2007 Baseball World Cup. He earned the win in that game.

He was on Panama's roster for the 2009 World Baseball Classic, but did not pitch in any games.
