= James Avery (baseball) =

- Pitcher
- Born: June 10, 1984 (age 41); Maple Creek, Saskatchewan, Canada
- Bats: Right Throws: Right
- Stats at Baseball Reference

James Avery (born June 10, 1984, in Maple Creek, Saskatchewan, Canada) is a former Minor League Baseball player. He was also a competitor for Canada in baseball at the 2008 Summer Olympics in Beijing.

== Amateur career ==
A native of Maple Creek, Saskatchewan, Canada, Avery played college baseball at Niagara University. In 2003 and 2004, he played collegiate summer baseball with the Chatham A's of the Cape Cod Baseball League.

== Professional career ==
=== Cincinnati Reds ===
Avery went 1–2 over 11 appearances, seven starts, split between the Rookie-League Gulf Coast Reds and Class-A Dayton Dragons of the Midwest League in 2005.

He spent majority of the 2006 season with Class-A Advanced Sarasota Reds, where he went 8–8 with a 4.43 ERA over 26 starts. He compiled a 2.22 ERA over five starts in the month of August. Avery lasted a season-high 8 2/3 innings against Fort Myers Miracle on September 3, allowing one run on seven hits en route to eighth and final win of the season. He made his first and only Triple-A appearance on August 24, allowing four runs over four innings of work as a member of the Louisville Bats.

Avery went 11–10 with a 5.22 ERA in 27 starts for the Double-A Chattanooga Lookouts in 2007. He was named Southern League Pitcher of the Week for May 7 to 13, going 2–0 with 13 innings pitched, three earned runs a 2.08 ERA with seven strikeouts.

With the Lookouts in 2008 he struck out season-high seven and allowed one earned run over six innings for his best outing of the year on May 3. He started all 24 games he appeared in and finished 7–8.
