= Dong Chunhua =

Chinese baseball player

Dong Chunhua (simplified Chinese: 董春华; traditional Chinese: 董春華; pinyin: Dǒng Chūnhuá; born 4 August 1990 in China) is a Chinese baseball catcher for the Shanghai Eagles. He was a member of the China national baseball team in the 2009 World Baseball Classic.
