= Yang Yang (baseball) =

Chinese baseball player

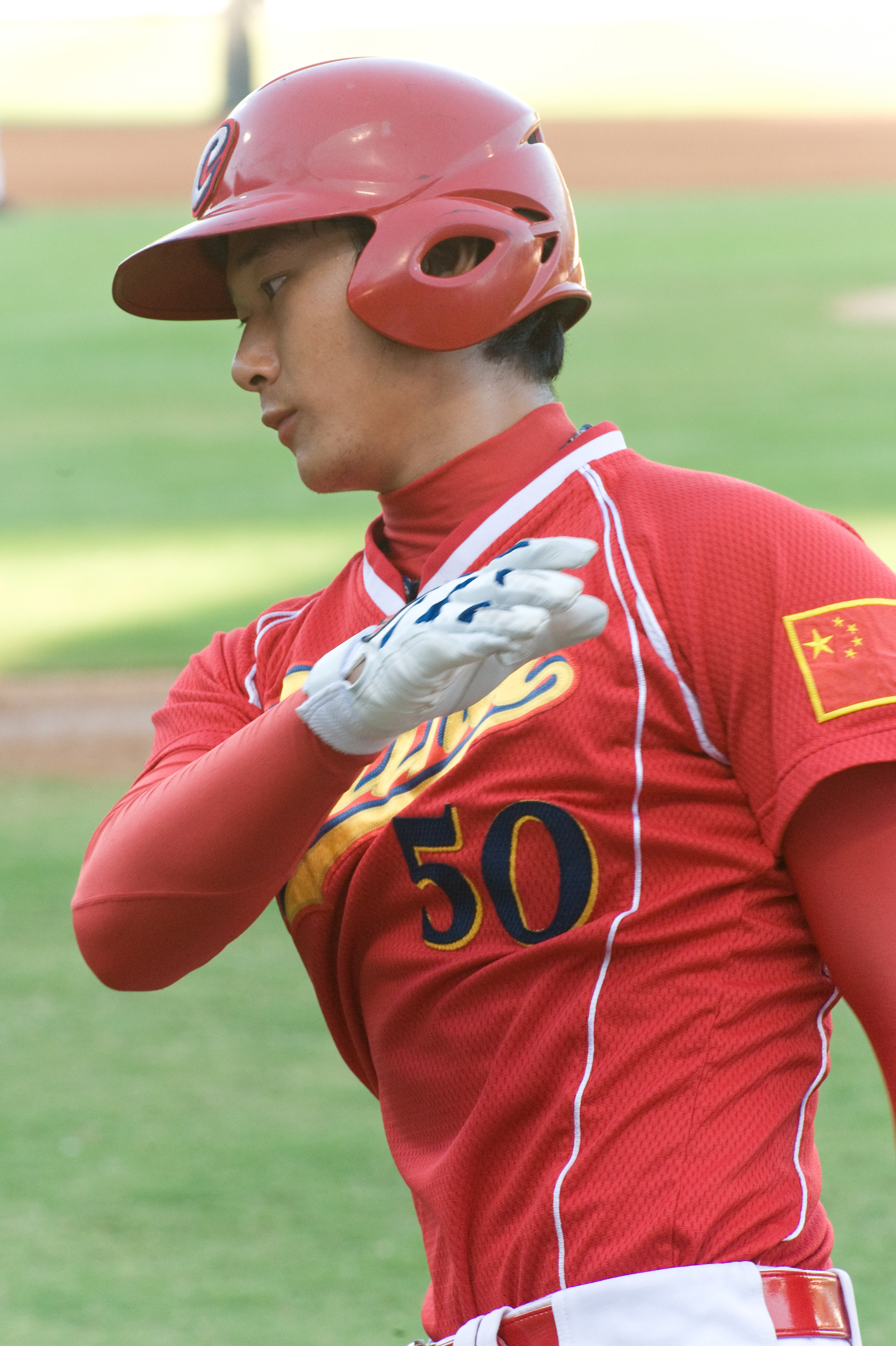
- Yang with the China national baseball team in 2008
- Catcher
- Born: 19 May 1986 (age 39); Beijing, China
- Bats: Right Throws: Right

Yang Yang (simplified Chinese: 杨洋; traditional Chinese: 楊洋; pinyin: Yáng Yáng; born 19 May 1986 in Beijing, China) is a Chinese baseball player who was a member of Team China in the 2008 Summer Olympics.

== Sports career ==
- 1994 Beijing Fengtai Baseball and Softball School;
- 2002 Beijing Municipal Team;
- 2004 National Junior Team;
- 2008 National Team for Intensified Training

== Major performances ==
- 2002 Beijing Municipal Games - 1st;
- 2003 National Intercity Games - 1st;
- 2005/2006 National Junior League - 2nd/1st;
- 2006/2007 National Championship - 1st/2nd;
