= Brooks McNiven =

Canadian professional baseball pitcher (born 1981)

- Pitcher, Educator
- Born: June 19, 1981 (age 45); Terrace, British Columbia, Canada
- Bats: Right Throws: Right
- Stats at Baseball Reference
Medals
Men's baseball
Representing Canada
Baseball World Cup
Bronze medal – third place	2009 Nettuno	Team

Brooks McNiven, born June 19, 1981 in Terrace, British Columbia, is a Canadian professional baseball pitcher. He last played for the San Francisco Giants organization.

McNiven was initially drafted as a high schooler by the Blue Jays in the 46th round of the 1999 Major League Baseball draft but did not sign. He was drafted by the Giants in the 4th round of the 2003 Major League Baseball draft.

McNiven has represented Team Canada during several international baseball tournaments. He played for Canada at the 2007 Baseball World Cup, the 2008 Summer Olympics in Beijing, and most recently was a member of the Canadian contingent at the 2009 World Baseball Classic. However, he did not enter either of Canada's games during the tournament. He now works at Sentinel Secondary School as a PE teacher.
