= T. J. Burton =

Canadian baseball player

T.J. Burton
- Pitcher
- Born: July 30, 1983 (age 43); Ottawa, Ontario, Canada
- Bats: Left Throws: Right
- Stats at Baseball Reference

Timothe Joseph "T. J." Burton (born July 30, 1983 in Ottawa) is a Canadian former professional baseball player.

== Life ==
He attended Notre Dame High School (Ottawa). He was selected by the Cleveland Indians in the 18th Round (547th overall) of the 2001 Major League Baseball draft. Burton played in the Cleveland Indians and Houston Astros minor league systems from 2002 to 2010.

Burton was a part of the Canada national baseball team at the 2008 Summer Olympics and 2009 World Baseball Classic.
