= Jia Delong =

Chinese baseball player

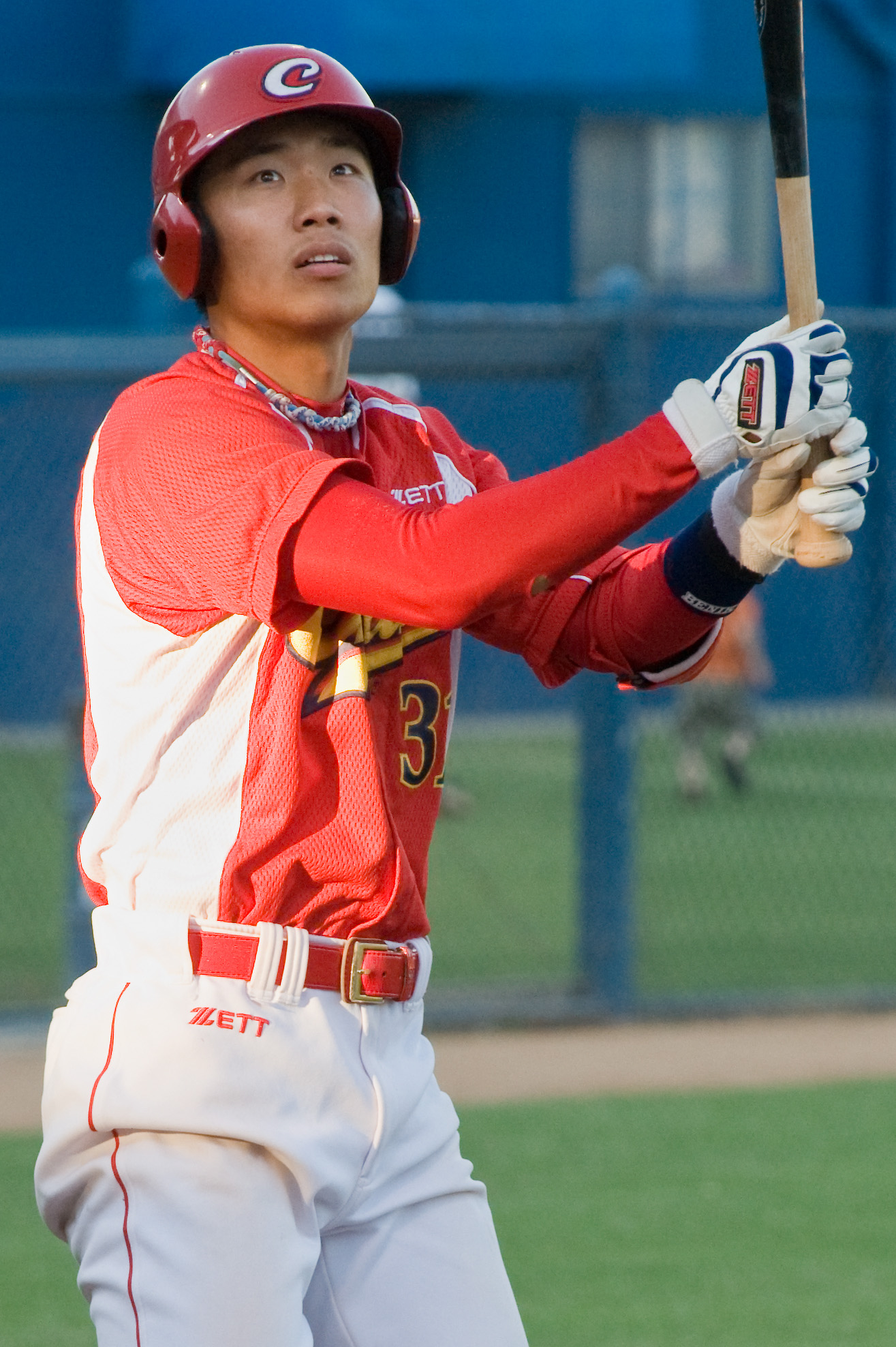
- Delong with the China national baseball team in 2008
- Shortstop
- Born: July 4, 1985 (age 40); Liaoning, China
- Bats: Right Throws: Right

Jia Delong (simplified Chinese: 贾德龙; traditional Chinese: 賈德龍; pinyin: Jiǎ Délóng; born 4 July 1985) is a Chinese baseball player who was a member of Team China at the 2008 Summer Olympics.

== Sports career ==
- 2002 Guangdong Provincial Team;
- 2006 National Team

== Major performances ==
- 2005 National Games - 5th;
- 2006/2007 National League - 2nd;
- 2006 National Championship - 4th
