= Arquimedes Nieto =

Panamanian baseball player (born 1989)

- Pitcher
- Born: April 28, 1989 (age 37); Panama City, Panama
- Bats: Right Throws: Right
- Stats at Baseball Reference

Arquimedes Nieto (born April 28, 1989) is a Panamanian former professional baseball pitcher who played with the Panama national baseball team at the 2009 World Baseball Classic.

== Minor league career ==
Nieto began his professional career in 2007, with the Dominican Summer League Cardinals. He went 4–2 with a 2.73 ERA in 13 games (10 starts). In 2008, Nieto pitched for the Batavia Muckdogs, going 6–1 with a 2.95 ERA in 15 games (nine starts). He began 2009 with the Quad Cities River Bandits.

== World Baseball Classic ==
In the 2009 World Baseball Classic, Nieto appeared in one game, pitching two-thirds of an inning. He allowed one hit and one walk and did not give up a run. Both of the outs he pitched were strikeouts.
