= Luis Molina (baseball) =

Panamanian baseball player and manager

Luis Molina (born March 22, 1974, in Chinandega, Nicaragua) is a baseball coach and scout. He was one of the coaches of the Panamanian national team in the 2009 World Baseball Classic.
