= Hou Fenglian =

Chinese baseball player

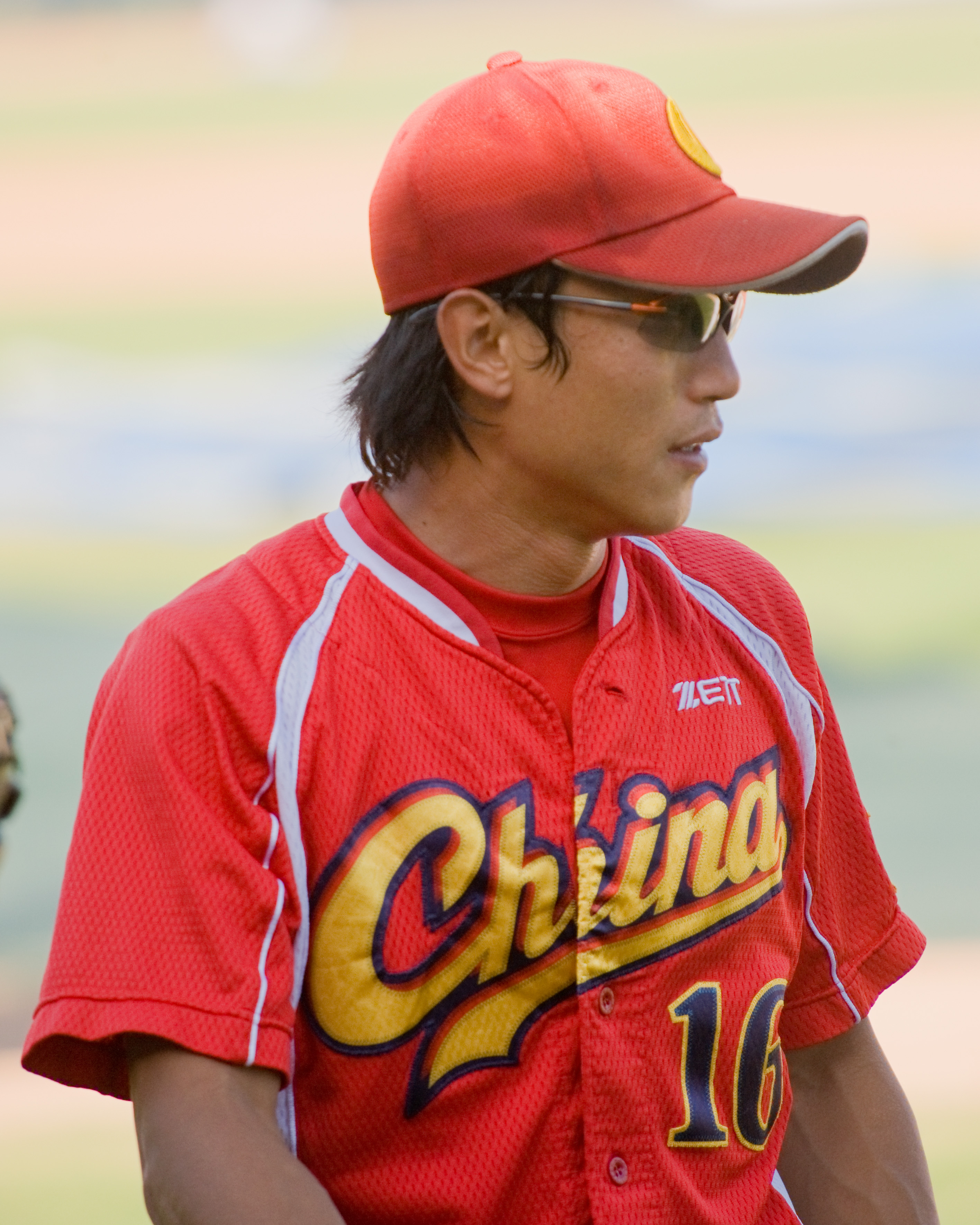
- Hou with the China national baseball team in 2008
- Second baseman
- Born: 11 July 1980 (age 45); Tianjin, China
- Bats: Both Throws: Right

Hou Fenglian (simplified Chinese: 侯凤连; traditional Chinese: 侯鳳連; pinyin: Hóu Fènglián; born 11 July 1980 in Tianjin, China) is a Chinese baseball player who was a member of Team China at the 2008 Summer Olympics.

In 2007, he played for Team China in the Arizona Fall League.

== Sports career ==
- 1991 Tianjin Xiqing Sports School (Baseball);
- 1996 Tianjin Municipal Team;
- 2000 National Team

== Major performances ==
- 2005 National Games - Tianjin Team - 1st
