= Martin Gordon (baseball) =

South African baseball player

Martin Gordon is a member of the South African national baseball team. He attended Desert Vista High School for 4 years, and was recruited to play baseball at Glendale Community College (Arizona). He transferred to Francis Marion University (South Carolina) after his two years at Glendale.

== Background ==
Gordon was born 13 June 1988, in Potchefstroom, South Africa. He was raised in a family of athletes. His father, Mickey Gordon, played field hockey for Free State, Southern Gauteng, and South Africa Schools. He also played cricket for the provinces of Free State and North West. His mother, Elrie, played field hockey for North West as well.

== High school ==
=== Desert Vista High School ===
Gordon was a 2 year varsity starter in center field for head coach Stan Luketich. He was an important part of the 2005 Desert Vista team who spent the whole season under the radar, and eventually lost in the Arizona 5A semi-finals against a very talented Horizon High School. Gordon set a school record by going 68 straight at-bats without a strikeout.

In his senior year he was invited to play in the North vs. South, Arizona 5A All Star Game. He was second-team All-State in his senior season.

== Education ==
=== Glendale Community College ===
After high school, Gordon was recruited by Paul Hatcher, the assistant coach at GCC.

In 2007 as a freshman he hit .349 and stole 24 bases in 27 tries for the Gauchos, and was one of three outfielders in the nation to earn Rawlings Gold Glove honors.

In 2008, he hit .324 and went 22-for-26 in stolen bases and hit his first career collegiate home run in the playoffs against Phoenix College.

=== Francis Marion University ===
In 2008, Gordon was recruited to play for head coach Art Inabinent for the FMU Patriots. In 2009, Gordon hit .394 in 41 games. He registered 18 RBIs, 15 BBs, and 8 Ks out of the leadoff spot. He played a majority of the season in center field and a handful of games in left field. He was a part of the first FMU team in history to be crowned the Peach Belt Tournament Champions.

== Career ==
Due to a back injury in 2010, Gordon received a medical redshirt.

Gordon returned in 2011 and hit .374 in 41 games for the Patriots. In addition, he had 20 RBIs, 4 BBs, and 7 Ks, and hit his first home run for the Patriots in a game against the University of North Georgia. He played all 41 games in left field. This team was the first FMU team in history to win the Peach Belt Regular Season, and came within one win of the College World Series.

== International Competition ==
=== 2007 Baseball World Cup ===
In the 2007, Gordon was asked to play in the 2007 Baseball World Cup in Taiwan, where he was the main center fielder for the South African national team. He went 9 for 27 to lead South Africa in average. Only Brett Willemburg and Warren Herman (the latter in limited action) joined Gordon to hit over .300 for South Africa's club. Gordon handled all 10 chances in center flawlessly in 6 games there; he also played one at DH and a couple innings in left field.

=== 2009 World Baseball Classic ===
Gordon was asked to play for the National Team in the 2009 World Baseball Classic.

In a pre-tournament game against the Los Angeles Angels, Gordon went 3 for 5 with 2 runs scored.

In game one of the tournament, Gordon went 0 for 4, but scored the only run in an 8-1 loss against Cuba.

In game two against Mexico, Gordon went 1 for 3, with a single off of Major League Pitcher Rodrigo Lopez.
