= Li Lei (baseball) =

Chinese baseball player (born 1984)

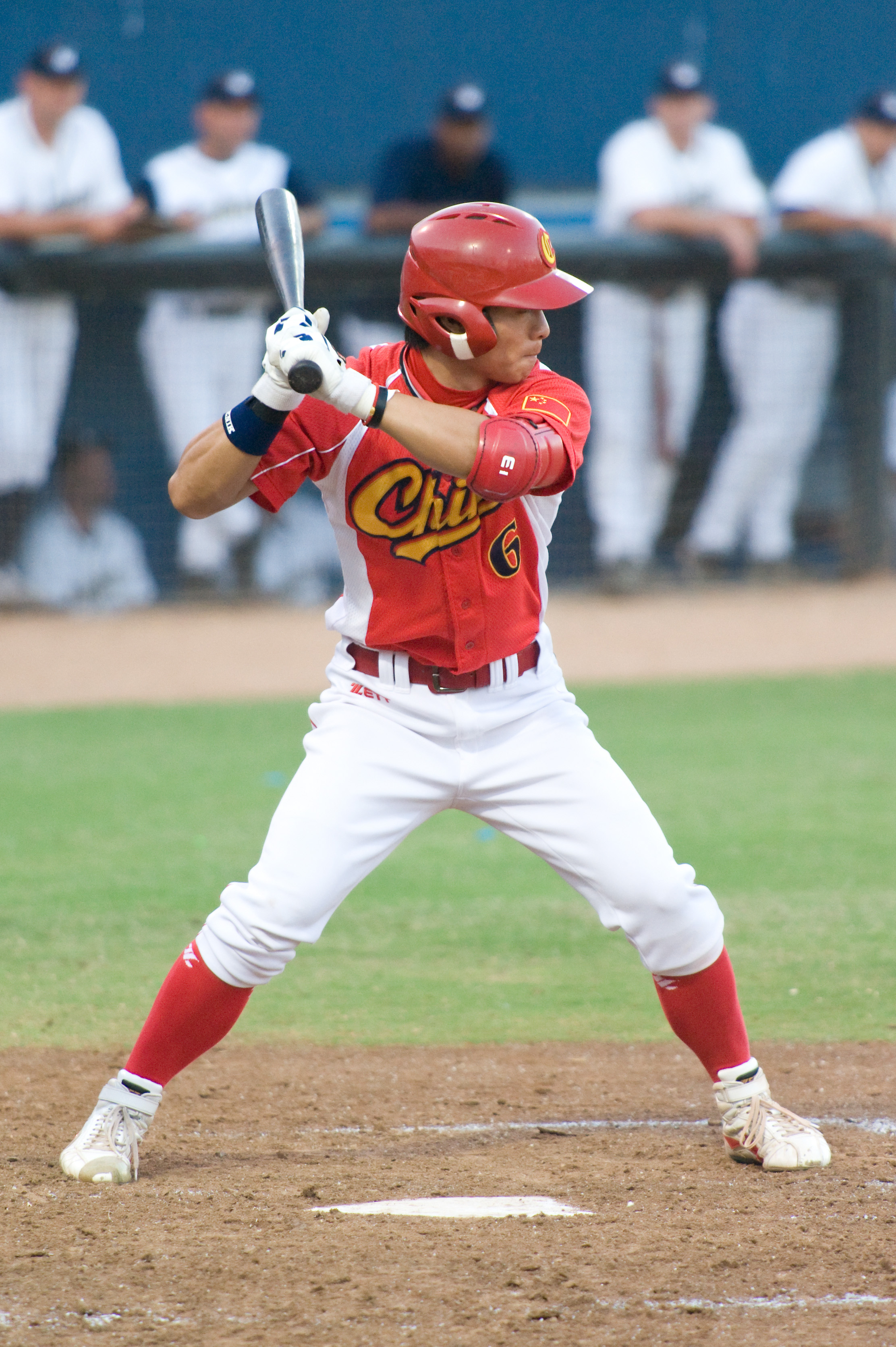
- Li with the China national baseball team in 2008
- Born: 24 June 1984 (age 41); Beijing, China
- Bats: Right Throws: Right

Li Lei (Chinese: 李磊; pinyin: Lǐ Lěi; born 24 June 1984 in Beijing, China) is a Chinese baseball player who played as an outfielder for Team China at the 2008 Summer Olympics.

== Sports career ==
- 2003–Present Beijing Municipal Baseball Team
- 2004 National Team

== Major performances ==
- 2005 National Games - 2nd
- 2006 Asian Games - 4th
