= Sichuan Dragons =

Baseball team based in Chengdu, Sichuan

Sichuan Dragons (四川蛟龙) is a baseball team based in Chengdu, Sichuan and a member of the China Baseball League since 2005. They play out of 2,000-capacity Jinnui Stadium.

== Roster ==
- Pitchers
  - Kun Chen
  - Bo Zhao
- Infielders
  - Fei Feng, SS
