= Chen Kun (baseball) =

Chinese baseball player (born 1980)

Sichuan Dragons
- Pitcher
- Born: March 5, 1980 (age 46)
- Bats: Right Throws: Right

Chen Kun (simplified Chinese: 陈坤; traditional Chinese: 陳坤; pinyin: Chén Kūn; born 5 March 1980 in Panzhihua, Sichuan, China) is a Chinese baseball player who was a member of Team China at the 2008 Summer Olympics. He also played for China at the 1999 Asian Baseball Championship, 2005 Konami Cup Asia Series, 2005 Baseball World Cup, 2006 Asian Games, 2006 World Baseball Classic, 2009 World Baseball Classic, 2013 World Baseball Classic and 2017 World Baseball Classic.
