= Sun Guoqiang =

Chinese baseball player

Sun Guoqiang 孙 国强

Jiangsu Hopestars – No. 0
- Pitcher
- Born: May 30, 1974 (age 51); Zhengzhou, Henan
- Bats: Right Throws: Right

Sun Guoqiang (simplified Chinese: 孙国强; traditional Chinese: 孫國強; pinyin: Sūn Guóqiáng; born 30 May 1974 in Zhengzhou, Henan, China) is a Chinese baseball player who was a member of Team China at the 2008 Summer Olympics.

== Major performances ==
- 1997 National Games - 4th
