= Li Weiliang =

Chinese baseball player

Li Weiliang (simplified Chinese: 李韦良; traditional Chinese: 李韋良; pinyin: Lǐ Wéiliáng; born 2 September 1980 in Beijing, China) is a Chinese baseball player. He was a member of Team China at the 2008 Summer Olympics.

== Sports career ==
- 1997 Beijing Municipal Baseball Team B;
- 1998 Beijing Municipal Team;
- 2000 National Youth Team;
- 2003 National Team

== Major performances ==
- 1998 National Championship - 1st;
- 1999 National Champions Tournament - 1st;
- 2001/2005 National Games - 3rd/2nd;
- 2003 National Intercity Games - 1st;
- 2003-2005 National League - 1st;
- 2005 Asian Championship - 3rd
