= Feng Fei (baseball) =

Chinese baseball player

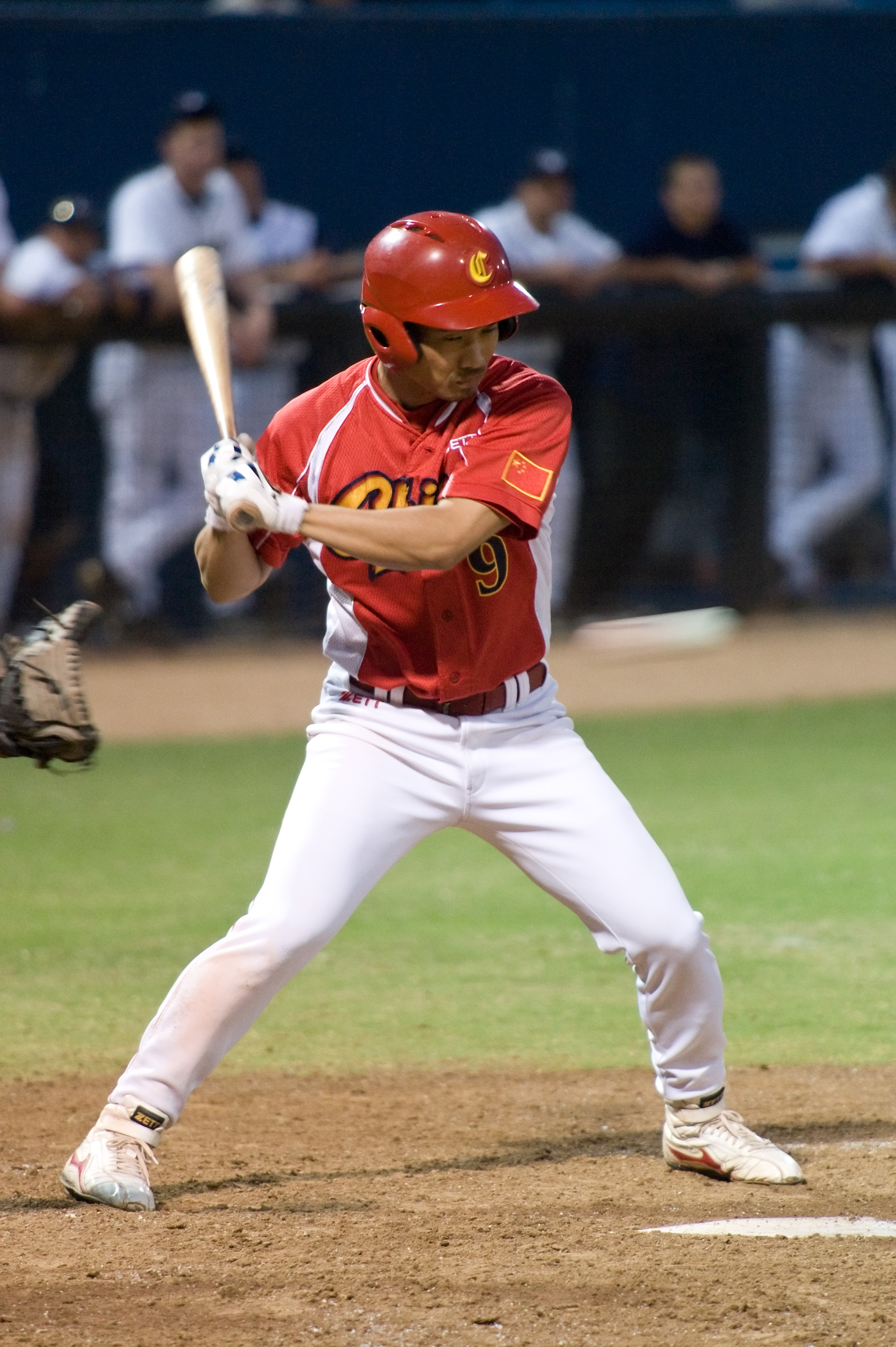
- Feng with the China national baseball team in 2008
- Outfielder
- Born: 18 February 1983 (age 43); Chengdu, China
- Bats: Right Throws: Right

Feng Fei (simplified Chinese: 冯飞; traditional Chinese: 馮飛; pinyin: Féng Fēi; born 18 February 1983 in Chengdu, Sichuan, China) is a Chinese baseball player who was a member of Team China at the 2008 Summer Olympics.

== Sports career ==
- 1990-1997 Chengdu Jinniu District Spare-time Sports School;
- 1997–Present Sichuan Taipingsi Air Sports School Table Tennis, Badminton and *Tennis Administrative Center;
- 2003 National Team

== Major performances ==
- 2005 National Games - 3rd;
- 2004/2005 National League - 1st;
- 2005 Asian Championship - 3rd
