= 2007 China Baseball League season =

The 2007 China Baseball League season saw the Tianjin Lions defeat the Guangdong Leopards in 3 games to 1 to win the Championship Series.

== Standings ==
=== Southeast Division ===
Southeast Division	G	W	L	PCT
Tianjin Lions	18	13	5	72.2
Beijing Tigers	18	12	6	66.6
Sichuan Dragons	18	7	11	41.6

=== Southwest Division ===
Southeast Division	G	W	L	PCT
Guangdong Leopards	18	12	6	66.6
Jiangsu Hopestars	18	7	11	38.8
Shanghai Golden Eagles	18	3	15	16.6

== Awards ==
Award	Player	Team
The best right-handed award	Chen Junyi	Guangdong Leopards
The best lefty award	Lu Jiangang	Tianjin Lions
The home run crown award	Jia Yubing	Beijing Tigers
The stolen bases award	Li Lei	Beijing Tigers
The best hits award	Wang Chao	Tianjin Lions
The best score award	Wang Chao	Tianjin Lions
The best rookie award	Liu Kai	Guangdong Leopards
