= 2005 China Baseball League season =

Domestic baseball league season

The 2005 China Baseball League season saw the Beijing Tigers defeat the Tianjin Lions in two games to win the Championship Series.

The Tigers had also won the 2004 China Baseball League season. The league expanded to six teams ahead of the 2005 season, and each team played 90 games.

== Standings ==
Team
Beijing Tigers
Tianjin Lions
Guangdong Leopards
Shanghai Golden Eagles
Sichuan Dragons
Jiangsu Hopestars

== Awards ==
Award	Player	Team
Best pitcher	Wang Nan	Beijing Tigers
Best left hand pitcher	Su Changlong	Tianjin Lions
Best right hand pitcher	Zhou Jian	Beijing Tigers
Best hits hand	Zhang Yufeng	Shanghai Golden Eagles
Best score	Zhang Yufeng	Shanghai Golden Eagles
Best rookie	State Tao	Jiangsu Hopestars
Most valuable player	Jiang Xiaoyu	Beijing Tigers
