= 2009 China Baseball League season =

The 2009 China Baseball League season saw the Beijing Tigers defeat the Guangdong Leopards in 1 games to win the Championship Series.

== Awards ==
Award	Player	Team
The best pitcher award	Wang Nan	Beijing Tigers
The best rookie award	Mung Weichiang	Guangdong Leopards
Most Valuable Player	Sun Lingfeng	Beijing Tigers
