= 2010 China Baseball League season =

The 2010 China Baseball League season saw the Guangdong Leopards defeat the Beijing Tigers in 2 games to win the Championship Series.

== Awards ==
Award	Player	Team
The best pitcher award	Wang Nan	Beijing Tigers
The best rookie award	Mung Weichiang	Guangdong Leopards
Most Valuable Player	Sun Lingfeng	Beijing Tigers
