= 2014 China Baseball League season =

The 2014 China Baseball League season was severely truncated, after being twice delayed, with each team only playing two three-game series before the finals between the top-ranked sides. The Tianjin Lions defeated the Beijing Tigers 2 games to 1 to win the championship.

== Final standings ==
Team	W	L
Tianjin Lions	6	0
Beijing Tigers	5	1
Jiangsu Pegasus	1	5
Guangdong Leopards	0	6
