= 2019 China National Baseball League season =

2019 China National Baseball League
- League: China National Baseball League
- Sport: Baseball
- Duration: 15 August-27 October 2019
- Number of games: 18
- Number of teams: 4

Regular season
- Season champions: Beijing Tigers

Finals
- Champions: Beijing Tigers
- Runners-up: Jiangsu Huge Horses

Seasons
- 2020 →

The 2019 China National Baseball League season is the 1st season in the history of the China National Baseball League. The season began on 15 August, with the last scheduled day of the regular season on 13 October.

== Standings ==
Rank	Team	W	L	Pct.
1	Beijing Tigers	13	5	.722
2	Jiangsu Huge Horses	11	7	.611
3	Guangdong Leopards	6	12	.333
4	Tianjin Lions	6	12	.333

== Weeks ==
=== Week 1 ===
15 August; 19:00	Tianjin Lions	3–2	Beijing Tigers

Team	R
Beijing Tigers	2
Tianjin Lions	3

16 August; 18:30	Jiangsu Huge Horses	11–8	Guangdong Leopards

Team	R
Guangdong Leopards	8
Jiangsu Huge Horses	11

16 August; 18:30	Tianjin Lions	0–4	Beijing Tigers

Team	R
Beijing Tigers	4
Tianjin Lions	0

17 August; 18:30	Jiangsu Huge Horses	11–1	Guangdong Leopards

Team	R
Guangdong Leopards	1
Jiangsu Huge Horses	11

17 August; 10:00	Tianjin Lions	2–3	Beijing Tigers

Team	R
Beijing Tigers	3
Tianjin Lions	2

18 August; 10:00	Jiangsu Huge Horses	3–6	Guangdong Leopards

Team	R
Guangdong Leopards	6
Jiangsu Huge Horses	3

=== Week 2 ===
23 August; 18:30	Jiangsu Huge Horses	12–2	Tianjin Lions

Team	R
Tianjin Lions	2
Jiangsu Huge Horses	12

23 August; 18:30	Guangdong Leopards	1–4	Beijing Tigers

Team	R
Beijing Tigers	4
Guangdong Leopards	1

24 August; 18:30	Jiangsu Huge Horses	1–3	Tianjin Lions

Team	R
Tianjin Lions	3
Jiangsu Huge Horses	1

24 August; 18:30	Guangdong Leopards	5–12	Beijing Tigers

Team	R
Beijing Tigers	12
Guangdong Leopards	5

25 August; 10:00	Jiangsu Huge Horses	9–3	Tianjin Lions

Team	R
Tianjin Lions	3
Jiangsu Huge Horses	9

25 August; 10:00	Guangdong Leopards	8–7	Beijing Tigers

Team	R
Beijing Tigers	7
Guangdong Leopards	8

=== Week 3 ===
30 August; 14:30	Beijing Tigers	4–3	Guangdong Leopards

Team	1	2	3	4	5	6	7	8	9	R	H	E
Guangdong Leopards	1	1	0	0	0	0	0	1	0	3	7	1
Beijing Tigers	0	0	0	0	1	1	1	1	X	4	5	1

30 August; 18:30	Tianjin Lions	3–5	Jiangsu Huge Horses

Team	1	2	3	4	5	6	7	8	9	R	H	E
Jiangsu Huge Horses	1	1	0	0	0	0	1	0	2	5	12	1
Tianjin Lions	0	2	0	0	1	0	0	0	0	3	10	1

31 August; 14:30	Beijing Tigers	10–0 (F/8)	Guangdong Leopards

Team	1	2	3	4	5	6	7	8	9	R	H	E
Guangdong Leopards	0	0	0	0	0	0	0	0	X	0	3	1
Beijing Tigers	0	1	3	3	0	0	0	3	X	10	12	0

31 August; 18:30	Tianjin Lions	1–10	Jiangsu Huge Horses

Team	1	2	3	4	5	6	7	8	9	R	H	E
Jiangsu Huge Horses	1	0	1	2	0	2	3	1	0	10	11	0
Tianjin Lions	0	1	0	0	0	0	0	0	0	1	4	1

1 September; 10:00	Beijing Tigers	7–5	Guangdong Leopards

Team	1	2	3	4	5	6	7	8	9	R	H	E
Guangdong Leopards	0	0	0	0	0	1	0	0	4	5	12	3
Beijing Tigers	0	1	0	2	2	1	0	1	X	7	8	0

1 September; 10:00	Tianjin Lions	4–6	Jiangsu Huge Horses

Team	1	2	3	4	5	6	7	8	9	R	H	E
Jiangsu Huge Horses	0	0	4	0	0	2	0	0	0	6	13	0
Tianjin Lions	0	1	0	3	0	0	0	0	0	4	10	1

=== Week 4 ===
13 September :	Jiangsu Huge Horses	2–4	Beijing Tigers

Team
Beijing Tigers
Jiangsu Huge Horses

13 September :	Guangdong Leopards	2–4	Tianjin Lions

Team
Tianjin Lions
Guangdong Leopards

14 September :	Jiangsu Huge Horses	5–6	Beijing Tigers

Team
Beijing Tigers
Jiangsu Huge Horses

14 September :	Guangdong Leopards	6–5	Tianjin Lions

Team
Tianjin Lions
Guangdong Leopards

15 September :	Jiangsu Huge Horses	3–2	Beijing Tigers

Team
Beijing Tigers
Jiangsu Huge Horses

15 September :	Guangdong Leopards	4–2	Tianjin Lions

Team
Tianjin Lions
Guangdong Leopards

=== Week 5 ===
20 September :	Beijing Tigers	6–8	Tianjin Lions

Team
Tianjin Lions
Beijing Tigers

20 September :	Guangdong Leopards	7–6	Jiangsu Huge Horses

Team
Jiangsu Huge Horses
Guangdong Leopards

21 September :	Beijing Tigers	10–1	Tianjin Lions

Team
Tianjin Lions
Beijing Tigers

21 September :	Guangdong Leopards	2–13	Jiangsu Huge Horses

Team
Jiangsu Huge Horses
Guangdong Leopards

22 September :	Beijing Tigers	9–7	Tianjin Lions

Team
Tianjin Lions
Beijing Tigers

22 September :	Guangdong Leopards	0–10 (F/8)	Jiangsu Huge Horses

Team
Jiangsu Huge Horses
Guangdong Leopards

=== Week 6 ===
11 October :	Beijing Tigers	2–0	Jiangsu Huge Horses

Team
Jiangsu Huge Horses
Beijing Tigers

11 October :	Tianjin Lions	3–2	Guangdong Leopards

Team
Guangdong Leopards
Tianjin Lions

12 October :	Beijing Tigers	2–5	Jiangsu Huge Horses

Team
Jiangsu Huge Horses
Beijing Tigers

12 October :	Tianjin Lions	8–6	Guangdong Leopards

Team
Guangdong Leopards
Tianjin Lions

13 October :	Beijing Tigers	5–4	Jiangsu Huge Horses

Team
Jiangsu Huge Horses
Beijing Tigers

13 October :	Tianjin Lions	0–13 (F/7)	Guangdong Leopards

Team
Guangdong Leopards
Tianjin Lions

== Finals ==
=== Game 1 ===
16 October :	Jiangsu Huge Horses	2–5	Beijing Tigers

Team
Beijing Tigers
Jiangsu Huge Horses

=== Game 2 ===
17 October :	Jiangsu Huge Horses	13–5	Beijing Tigers

Team
Beijing Tigers
Jiangsu Huge Horses

=== Game 3 ===
19 October :	Beijing Tigers	11–1	Jiangsu Huge Horses

Team
Jiangsu Huge Horses
Beijing Tigers

=== Game 4 ===
20 October :	Beijing Tigers	5–0	Jiangsu Huge Horses

Team
Jiangsu Huge Horses
Beijing Tigers

== See also ==
- 2019 Major League Baseball season
- 2019 Nippon Professional Baseball season
- 2019 KBO League season
