= 2006 China Baseball League season =

Baseball League

The 2006 China Baseball League season saw the Tianjin Lions defeat the Guangdong Leopards in 3 games to win the Championship Series. The six teams were divided into two conferences for the first time.
