= 2019 in baseball =

== Champions ==
=== Major League Baseball ===
Wild Card Games (ALWC, NLWC)
4	Oakland	0
5	Tampa Bay	1
4	Washington	1
5	Milwaukee	0

Division Series (ALDS, NLDS)
1	Houston	3
5	Tampa Bay	2
American League
2	NY Yankees	3
3	Minnesota	0
1	LA Dodgers	2
4	Washington	3
National League
2	Atlanta	2
3	St. Louis	3

League Championship Series (ALCS, NLCS)
1	Houston	4
2	NY Yankees	2
4	Washington	4
3	St. Louis	0

World Series
AL1	Houston	3
NL4	Washington	4

=== Other champions ===
- Minor League Baseball
  - AAA
    - Championship: Sacramento River Cats (San Francisco Giants)
      - International League: Columbus Clippers (Cleveland Indians)
      - Pacific Coast League: Sacramento River Cats (San Francisco Giants)
    - Mexican League: Acereros de Monclova
  - AA
    - Eastern League: Trenton Thunder (New York Yankees)
    - Southern League: Jackson Generals (Arizona Diamondbacks)
    - Texas League: Amarillo Sod Poodles (San Diego Padres)
  - High A
    - California League: Visalia Rawhide (Arizona Diamondbacks)
    - Carolina League: Wilmington Blue Rocks (Kansas City Royals)
    - Florida State League: No Champions (playoffs cancelled because of Hurricane Dorian)
  - A
    - Midwest League: South Bend Cubs (Chicago Cubs)
    - South Atlantic League: Lexington Legends (Kansas City Royals)
  - Short Season A
    - New York–Penn League: Brooklyn Cyclones (New York Mets)
    - Northwest League: Hillsboro Hops (Arizona Diamondbacks)
  - Advanced Rookie
    - Appalachian League: Johnson City Cardinals (St. Louis Cardinals)
    - Pioneer League: Idaho Falls Chukars (Kansas City Royals)
  - Rookie
    - Arizona League: Arizona League Rangers (Texas Rangers)
    - Dominican Summer League: DSL Royals 1 (Kansas City Royals)
    - Gulf Coast League: No Champions (playoffs cancelled because of Hurricane Dorian)
  - Arizona Fall League: Salt River Rafters
- Independent baseball leagues
  - American Association: St. Paul Saints
  - Atlantic League: Long Island Ducks
  - Can-Am League: New Jersey Jackals
  - Empire League: Plattsburgh Thunderbirds
  - Frontier League: River City Rascals
  - Pacific Association: San Rafael Pacifics
  - Pecos League: Alpine Cowboys
  - United Shore League: Utica Unicorns
- Amateur
  - College
    - 2019 College World Series: Vanderbilt University
    - NCAA Division II: University of Tampa
    - NCAA Division III: Chapman University
    - NAIA: Tennessee Wesleyan University
    - Junior College World Series: Central Arizona College
    - Cape Cod League: Cotuit Kettleers
  - Youth
    - Junior League World Series: Golden Hill Little League (Fullerton, California)
    - Intermediate World Series: McCalla Little League (McCalla, Alabama)
    - Little League World Series: Eastbank Little League (River Ridge, Louisiana)
    - Senior League World Series: Central East Maui Little League (Wailuku, Hawaii)

== International competition ==
- National Teams
  - U-12 Baseball World Cup: Chinese Taipei
  - U-18 Baseball World Cup: Chinese Taipei
  - Asian Baseball Championship: Chinese Taipei
  - Europe/Africa Olympic Baseball Qualifier: Israel
  - European Baseball Championship: Netherlands
  - Pan American Games: Puerto Rico
  - World Port tournament: Netherlands
  - WBSC Premier12: Japan
- International club team competitions
  - Caribbean Series: Toros de Herrera
  - European Cup: Unipol Bologna
  - Latin American Series: Leones de León
- Domestic Summer Leagues
  - British League: London Mets
  - China National League: Beijing Tigers
  - Dutch Baseball League: Amsterdam Pirates
  - French League: Huskies de Rouen
  - Finnish Baseball Championship: Espoo Expos
  - German League: Heidenheim Heideköpfe
  - Irish Baseball League: Dublin City Hurricanes
  - Italian Baseball League: Unipol Bologna
  - Japan Series: Fukuoka SoftBank Hawks
    - Pacific League: Saitama Seibu Lions
    - Central League: Yomiuri Giants
  - Philippine Baseball League (2nd Conference): Philippine Air Force
  - Korean Series: Doosan Bears
  - Spanish League: Tenerife Marlins
  - Swedish League: Sölvesborg Firehawks
  - Taiwan Series: Lamigo Monkeys
- Domestic Winter Leagues
  - Australian Baseball League: Brisbane Bandits
  - Colombian League: Caimanes de Barranquilla
  - Cuban National Series: Las Tunas
  - Dominican League: Estrellas Orientales
  - Mexican Pacific League: Charros de Jalisco
  - Nicaraguan League: Leones de León
  - Panamanian League: Toros de Herrera
  - Philippine Baseball League (1st Conference): Adamson University
  - Puerto Rican League: Cangrejeros de Santurce
  - Venezuelan League:Cardenales de Lara
  - Veracruz Winter League: Tobis de Acayucan

== Awards and honors ==
=== Major League Baseball ===
- Baseball Hall of Fame Honors

== Events ==
=== January ===
- January 3 – Veteran shortstop Troy Tulowitzki signed a one-year contract with the New York Yankees after missing the entire 2018 season due to bone spurs. The Yankees will pay Tulowitzki the major league minimum salary for 2019 ($555,000), and the contract includes a no-trade clause. For the Yankees, Tulowitzki offered a lost-cost solution to their hole at shortstop, as Didi Gregorius will miss at least the first part of 2019 while he rehabs from Tommy John Surgery.
- January 11 – The Boston Red Sox and American League MVP Mookie Betts settled on a one-year deal worth $20 million. The salary figure is a record for a player in his second year of arbitration eligibility, with Betts still having one more year of arbitration-eligibility to go. Betts won his arbitration case with the Red Sox a year ago, securing $10.5 million, and will become an unrestricted free agent in 2021.
- January 15 – Longtime Pittsburgh Pirates broadcaster and former pitcher Steve Blass announced that he would be retiring following the 2019 season, his 60th with the Pirates organization. Blass, 76, was signed as a player in 1960. He spent his entire ten-year career in the majors with the team. His most productive season came 1n 1972, when he posted a 19–8 record with a 2.49 ERA, 12 complete games and five shutouts, while earning an All Star berth and finishing as the runner-up in NL Cy Young voting. In addition, he pitched two complete games victories for the Pirates in Games 3 and 7 of the 1971 World Series triumph over the Baltimore Orioles. Afterwards, Blass joined the team's broadcast crew in 1983. Since 2005, he worked Pirates home games and select road trips, and the 2019 season will be his club-record 34th year as a color analyst for the organization.
- January 21 – The Cincinnati Reds acquire veteran starting pitcher Sonny Gray from the New York Yankees, which was followed by signing him to a three-year extension of $30,500,000 that includes a $12 million club option for 2023. Reiver Sanmartin, a minor league pitcher, also came to Cincinnati along with prospect second baseman Shed Long winding up in Seattle after being traded by the Yankees. New York also received an undisclosed draft pick.
- January 22 – For the second consecutive year, the Baseball Writers' Association of America elects four players into the Hall of Fame, including the first player ever selected unanimously, Mariano Rivera, Major League Baseball's all-time saves leader, who was listed on all 425 ballots cast. Rivera is joined by Roy Halladay and Edgar Martínez, both of whom receive 363 votes (85.4%), and Mike Mussina, who receives 326 votes (76.7%). Rivera and Halladay are both elected in their first year on the ballot, while Mussina is elected in his sixth year and Martínez in his tenth and last. Halladay, who died in a plane crash in November 2017, also becomes the first player to be elected posthumously by the BBWAA since Roberto Clemente in 1973. Also in his final year of eligibility, Fred McGriff was unable to receive enough votes to be elected in to Cooperstown by the BBWAA.
- January 26 – The Los Angeles Dodgers signed free agent center fielder A. J. Pollock a four-year, $55 million deal, plus a $10 million player option for a fifth year. If Pollock declines that option, the Dodgers must buy out his fifth year for $5 million.

=== February ===
- February 8 :
  - MLB commissioner Rob Manfred indicated at the annual owners' meeting that the league is not open to the introduction of the designated hitter rule to the National League. It emerged recently that MLB and the MLB Players Association were exchanging proposals on a variety of significant potential rules changes before the upcoming season. Some of those, including the introduction of a twenty-second pitch clock and a rule requiring any pitcher that enters a game to face at least three hitters, were set forth by the league.
  - The Philadelphia Phillies acquired All-Star catcher J. T. Realmuto in a four-player transaction with the Miami Marlins. In exchange, the Marlins received right-handed pitcher Sixto Sánchez, catcher Jorge Alfaro, lefty-handed pitching prospect Will Stewart and international bonus slot money.
- February 18 – San Francisco Giants manager Bruce Bochy announced that the 2019 season would be his last. Bochy is ranked 11th in all-time managerial wins with 1,926 career victories.
- February 22 – The San Diego Padres announced the signing of free agent Manny Machado. The 10-year deal will pay Machado $30 million annually through the 2028 season, and contain a six-team no-trade clause. He will play at third base for San Diego.
- February 26 – The Colorado Rockies and third baseman Nolan Arenado agreed to an eight-year, $260 million contract with an opt-out in three years. A four-time All-Star and six-time Gold Glove Award winner, Arenado will receive the highest annual salary of $32.5 million, surpassing the $31 million of Detroit Tigers designated hitter Miguel Cabrera, and behind the top earner in Major League Baseball, Arizona Diamondbacks pitcher Zack Greinke, at $34.4 million, for the largest in MLB history.

=== March ===
- March 2 – The Philadelphia Phillies reached an agreement to sign free agent outfielder Bryce Harper to a 13-year, $330 million contract. Harper will receive a $10 million salary and a $20 million signing bonus for the upcoming season. He will then be paid $26 million annually from 2020 through 2028 and $22 million annually from 2029 to 2031. In addition, Harper received full no-trade rights and does not possess any opt-out opportunities. It now stands as the largest fully guaranteed contract in the history of North American team sports, surpassing the 10-year, $300 million contract that Manny Machado signed with the San Diego Padres just the previous week, as well as the 13-year, $325 million deal that Giancarlo Stanton signed with the Miami Marlins in 2014. Mexican boxer Canelo Álvarez signed an 11-fight contract worth $365 million in 2018, but the contract is not guaranteed.
- March 9 – In a 5–2 victory over Virginia Tech in the second game of a doubleheader, Mike Martin became the all-time winningest baseball coach in Florida State history with his 2,000th career win and the first ever coach to reach the 2,000 win mark.
- March 14 – Major League Baseball and the Major League Baseball Players Association announced an agreement on significant changes to MLB roster rules that will take effect in 2020. Specifically:
  - Active rosters, currently limited to 25 players prior to September 1 (with very limited exceptions), will increase to 26 players.
  - The "expanded roster", which takes effect on September 1 of each season, will be reduced from 40 to 28 players. Additionally, all teams will be required to carry 28 active players for regular-season games on or after September 1.
  - Players will be specifically designated as "pitchers" or "position players" before each season, with this designation being fixed throughout the season. From 2020, only players designated as "pitchers" can pitch in any regular-season or postseason game, with the following exceptions:
    - One team is ahead by at least 6 runs when the player assumes a pitching role.
    - The game is in extra innings.
    - The player assuming the pitching role has qualified as a "two-way player". A player qualifies as such if, in the current or immediately previous season, he has (1) pitched at least 20 MLB innings and (2) played at least 20 games as a position player or designated hitter, with at least three plate appearances in each game counting toward the latter limit. No player in the 2019 MLB season has yet qualified as a "two-way player" under the new rule. The most prominent two-way player in today's game, Shohei Ohtani, cannot qualify in 2019 because he is not pitching while recovering from Tommy John surgery.
  - A joint MLB/MLBPA committee will make recommendations on limiting the size of pitching staffs that, if approved, will also take effect in 2020. MLB has proposed limiting pitching staffs to 13 through August 31, and 14 from September 1 to the end of the regular season.
- March 19 – The Los Angeles Angels signed outfielder Mike Trout to a ten-year extension that will pay him $426.5 million through the 2030 season. This represents the largest contract ever in sports history, overtaking boxer Canelo Álvarez, who signed an 11-fight $365 million deal with sports service DAZN in 2018. It is also almost $100 million more than Bryce Harper received on March 2, when he agreed a 13-year, $330 million deal with the Philadelphia Phillies.
- March 20 – The Seattle Mariners defeated the Oakland Athletics 1–0 in the first game of the 2019 regular season at the Tokyo Dome in Tokyo, Japan. This was the first of a two-game series that was widely expected to be the finale for Ichiro Suzuki as a player.
- March 21 – Immediately after the Seattle Mariners' 5–4, 12-inning victory over the Oakland Athletics in the second and final game of their Tokyo series, Ichiro Suzuki goes 0 for 4 as Seattle's right fielder, then leaves after the 8th inning. Ichiro announced his retirement after the game, ending a playing career in both NPB and MLB that spanned 27 seasons.
- March 23 – The Diablos Rojos del México (Red Devils) opened their new Alfredo Harp Helú baseball stadium in Mexico City.

=== April ===
- April 2 :
  - Ronald Acuña Jr. and the Atlanta Braves agreed to a $100 million, eight-year contract extension, which is the largest deal for a player under club control with less than one year of service. By way of team options for 2027 and 2028, the deal would max out at $124 million over 10 years. At 21, Acuña became the youngest player to sign a nine-figure contract in major league history, while winning the National League Rookie of the Year in 2018. Through 132 career games, the Venezuelan outfielder posted a .293/.366/.552 slash line, including 32 home runs, 26 doubles, 18 stolen bases, a .934 OPS (144 OPS+) and 5.6 WAR, according to Baseball Reference. Besides, Acuña became the seventh big leaguer to hit 25 home runs in a season before his 21st birthday—and the fastest to reach that mark, in 92 games. The other six on the list are Hall of Famers Mel Ott, Frank Robinson, Al Kaline, Orlando Cepeda and Eddie Mathews, as well as the ill-fated Tony Conigliaro.
  - Bryce Harper made his return to Nationals Park for the first time as a member of the Philadelphia Phillies. Showered by jeers for much of the game, Harper rebounded from a pair of early strikeouts against former Washington Nationals teammate Max Scherzer, by hitting a fifth-inning double off Scherzer and a sixth-inning RBI single off reliever Matt Grace before towering a two-run home run off Jeremy Hellickson in the eighth inning, while leading his new team to an 8–2 victory.
- April 5 – Minnesota Twins shortstop Jorge Polanco hit for the cycle in his first four at-bats of a 10–4 loss to the host Philadelphia Phillies. Besides, Polanco added a single in the ninth inning for his first five-hit game. It was Polanco's first career cycle, as well as the first of the current season, the 15th in franchise history, and the 11th since the Senators franchise became the Twins upon relocating from Washington, D.C., for the 1961 season.
- April 9 – In Opening Game at Fenway Park, Boston Red Sox manager Alex Cora and Toronto Blue Jays manager Charlie Montoyo made history, when they faced in a Major League game in which both teams were led by Puerto Rican-born managers. Toronto prevailed, 7–5.
- April 11 – Kansas City Royals outfielder Whit Merrifield saw his team-record hitting streak ended at 31 games, dating back to last season, after he went 0-for-6 in the Royals' 7–6 loss to the Seattle Mariners. The day before, Merrifield had passed George Brett for the longest streak in franchise history, which was set in 1980.
- April 13 – Baltimore Orioles first baseman Chris Davis ended his historic MLB record slump at 0-for-54 at Fenway Park, hitting a single and two doubles while driving in four runs as the Orioles beat the Boston Red Sox, 9–5, to stop a four-game losing streak. Davis, a two-time major league home run champion, had been 0-for-33 this season, as his single off pitcher Rick Porcello in the first inning was his first hit since September 14 of last season. The previous record for a position player had been established by Eugenio Vélez, a former San Francisco Giants and Los Angeles Dodgers infielder who went 0-for-46 during the 2010 and 2011 seasons. The all-time record for a hitless streak by any player was an 0-for-85 drought by Chicago Cubs pitcher Bob Buhl between 1962 and 1963.
- April 15 – Christian Yelich hit three home runs and drove in a career-high seven runs to carry the Milwaukee Brewers to a 10–7 win over the St. Louis Cardinals at Miller Park. The Brewers outfielder and reigning National League MVP has now hit seven home runs in his team's five games against the Cardinals to date in 2019. Besides, Yelich previously hit one homer apiece in the four-game season-opening series in Milwaukee, a record-tying start to a regular season.
- April 19 – Cleveland Indians prospect Will Benson hit four home runs, including a grand slam, to lead the Class-A Lake County Captains past 12–6 the visiting South Bend Cubs at Classic Park. Benson, who drove in eight runs, became the first player to hit four homers in a Midwest League game since Garrett Jones completed the feat for the Quad Cities River Bandits in 2002.
- April 20 – Los Angeles Angels slugger Albert Pujols surpassed Babe Ruth for fifth place in Major League Baseball history with his 1,993rd career run batted in in a 6–5 loss to the Seattle Mariners at Angel Stadium. Pujols drove home Andrelton Simmons with a double off Seattle's pitcher Yusei Kikuchi in the third inning to tie Ruth. In the ninth inning with the Angels trailing 6–4, Pujols passed Ruth with a solo home run off of Anthony Swarzak. Pujols only surpassed Ruth according to an MLB official starting point for the mark. It was not an official statistic until 1920, when Elias Sports Bureau did not count Ruth's RBIs from 1914 to 1919. Ruth played his first year with the New York Yankees, though his career began in 1914 with the Boston Red Sox. Nevertheless, according to the leaderboard at sites such as Baseball Reference, Ruth would have an overall total of 2,213 RBI, which would rank second all-time behind Hank Aaron with 2,297.
- April 26 – Three-time Cy Young winner Max Scherzer recorded his 2,500th career strikeout, becoming the third-fastest major league pitcher to reach the plateau, based on innings. The Washington Nationals ace stroke out 10 in seven innings against the visiting San Diego Padres, allowing two runs on four hits and got a no-decision in Washington's 4–3 loss. Scherzer need 2,155 1/3 innings to achieve his feat. The only pitchers to reach 2,500 strikeouts quicker than Scherzer are Hall of Famers Randy Johnson and Pedro Martínez. Johnson did it in 2,107 2/3 innings, while it took Martinez 2,152 2/3 frames. Scherzer has led the National League in strikeouts each of the past three seasons, including last year, when he became the fifth hurler since 2001 to record 300 punchouts in a single season.
- April 30 – CC Sabathia became the 17th pitcher in Major League Baseball history as well as the third left-hander to reach the 3,000 strikeout club. It took five pitches to Arizona Diamonbacks catcher and former New York Yankees player John Ryan Murphy in the second inning of a Yankees' 3–1 loss at Chase Field. Sabathia left the game after 5 1/3 innings, having given up two earned runs, five hits and two walks while striking out five. Sabathia joined lefties Randy Johnson and Steve Carlton in the select club. Besides, he is also the second African-American pitcher, after Bob Gibson, to have amassed 3,000 strikeouts in his career. Another pitcher with 3,000 strikeouts, Ferguson Jenkins, is a Black Canadian. These four pitchers are in the Baseball Hall of Fame. In February, two months after an unexpected offseason angioplasty that followed an earlier offseason knee surgery, Sabathia announced he would be retiring after 19 seasons.

=== May ===
- May 3 – Oakland Athletics catcher Josh Phegley went 4-for-5, including two doubles, one home run and eight runs batted in, in a 14–1 rout over the Pittsburgh Pirates at PNC Park. With his eight-RBI performance, Phegley set a single-game record for a catcher in Athletics' 119-year history and also marked the first time any Athletics player reached eight RBI in a game since third baseman Eric Chavez did it on August 30, 2001, against the Baltimore Orioles.
- May 4 – At t Fenway Park, the Boston Red Sox had a nine-run third inning in a 15–2 rout of the Chicago White Sox that included 10 straight hits, one shy of the major league record set by the Colorado Rockies in a 17–2 win against the Chicago Cubs at Coors Field on July 30, 2010. White Sox starter Manny Bañuelos had retired the first eight Red Sox batters he faced. Carson Fulmer replaced Bañuelos and interrupted the hit parade to end the inning after 14 batters. Red Sox rookie Michael Chavis hit two of the four home runs of Boston. Xander Bogaerts and Eduardo Núñez homered, Mookie Betts and J. D. Martinez had RBI doubles, and Christian Vázquez capped the streak with his second single of the inning.
- May 7 :
  - Mike Fiers pitched the second no-hitter of his career and the 300th no-hitter in Major League Baseball history, including the postseason, while leading the Oakland Athletics to a 2–0 win over the Cincinnati Reds at Oakland Coliseum. Previously, Fiers threw one no-hitter for the Houston Astros on August 21, 2015, against the Los Angeles Dodgers. Besides, Fiers became the 35th pitcher to throw multiple no-hitters. Four of them still active: Jake Arrieta, Homer Bailey, Max Scherzer and Justin Verlander, according to the Elias Sports Bureau.
  - Justin Turner hit three home runs and drove in a career-high six runs in the Los Angeles Dodgers' 9–0 victory over the Atlanta Braves at Dodger Stadium. This was the first career three-homer game and eighth multi-homer game for Turner, who propelled the Dodgers to the 2017 NL Championship Series title and missed the first six weeks of 2018 with a fractured wrist, ending with a subpar season.
- May 9 – Los Angeles Angels slugger Albert Pujols recorded his 2,000th career run batted in with a solo home run in the 13–0 rout of the Detroit Tigers at Comerica Park. Pujols became only the third player in Major League Baseball history to collect 2,000 or more RBI in a career, joining Hank Aaron (2,297) and Alex Rodriguez (2,086) in achieving the feat, according to the Elias Sports Bureau – the official statistician of Major League Baseball. Nevertheless, some discrepancies exist between the statistics provided today by different historical data providers. The RBI did not become an official baseball statistic until the 1920 MLB season, so Elias does not count the RBI accrued before that date. That designation wipes out the entire careers of Babe Ruth (2,214 in all; 1,990 in 1920 and later) and Cap Anson (2,075). Besides, the Baseball Almanac and Baseball Reference websites, among others, retroactively added RBI prior to 1920, based largely on research originally spearheaded by sports statistician and editor Pete Palmer for the Total Baseball encyclopedia series.
- May 14 – Boston Red Sox pitching ace Chris Sale struck out a career-high 17 against the Colorado Rockies at Fenway Park, becoming the first pitcher in Major League Baseball history to strike out 17 or more batters in a start lasting seven innings or fewer. After no-hitting the Baltimore Orioles for 5 2/3 innings and striking out 14 in his previous start, Sale was perfect through 12 Rockies batters, allowing only two runs, three hits and no walks over seven innings. Even though, Colorado rallied against the Boston bullpen to win 5–4 in the 11th inning. It was also the first 17-strikeout game for a left-handed pitcher since Johan Santana for the Minnesota Twins in 2007. Besides, the Red Sox tied their own franchise record with 24 strikeouts in a game, as their pitchers struck out 21 over the first nine innings. The only other time that has happened in MLB history was when the Red Sox did it against the Tampa Bay Rays on September 25, 2016.
- May 15 – Toronto Blue Jays pitcher Edwin Jackson made history when he set a Major League Baseball record by playing for the 14th different club during his 17-year career. Jackson made his debut with the Los Angeles Dodgers in his 20th birthday. Afterward, the now 35-year-old has played for the Tampa Bay Rays, Detroit Tigers, Arizona Diamondbacks, Chicago White Sox, St. Louis Cardinals, Washington Nationals, Chicago Cubs, Atlanta Braves, Miami Marlins, San Diego Padres, Baltimore Orioles and Oakland Athletics before joining the Blue Jays. In his debut for them, Jackson pitched five innings without a decision in a 4–3 loss to the San Francisco Giants at Oracle Park. He allowed three runs — two earned — on six hits and one walk while striking out two batters and hitting one, leaving after 77 pitches with the score tied at 3–3.
- May 17 – Kris Bryant matched a career high with three home runs in a game and drove in five runs, while the Chicago Cubs outscored the Washington Nationals 14–6 at Nationals Park. Bryant went deep in the seventh, eighth and ninth innings, making him the 12th player in Major League Baseball history to homer in three consecutive innings.
- May 28 – Derek Dietrich enjoyed a career night with three home runs and six runs batted in, while leading the Cincinnati Reds to an 11–6 victory over the Pittsburgh Pirates at Great American Ball Park. Besides, his 17 homers in the season already has set a career high, and 12 of his past 17 hits have been home runs. Dietrich has been successfully replacing the injured slugger Scooter Gennett, sidelined since spring training due to a groin injury. Dietrich did not have another at-bat to try to match Gennett, who tied a major league record with a four-home-run game in 2017.
- May 29 – Major League Baseball announced that the 2021 MLB All-Star Game will be hosted by the Atlanta Braves at SunTrust Park. Likewise, this will be the third time in franchise history the event has been awarded to the city of Atlanta, who has not hosted an All-Star Game since 2000.

=== June ===
- June 3 – Adley Rutschman became the first overall selection in the 2019 MLB draft after being selected by the Baltimore Orioles, who had the worst record in 2018.
- June 9 – Edwin Encarnación hit his 400th home run for the Seattle Mariners in a 9–3 victory over the host Anaheim Angels. Encarnación is now ranked 56th in the List of MLB players with the most home runs. The 36-year-old Dominican Republic slugger has hit 32 or more homers each of those past seven years and is on pace for 50 this season.
- June 10 – The Philadelphia Phillies and Arizona Diamondbacks combined for 13 home runs, the most in one game in major league history, in a 13–8 Diamondbacks victory. Jarrod Dyson, Ketel Marte, and David Peralta led off the game with three consecutive homers.
- June 13 – Los Angeles Angels two-way star Shohei Ohtani became the first Japanese-born player to hit for the cycle in the major leagues, helping the Angels defeat the Tampa Bay Rays 5–3 at Tropicana Field. Ohtani slugged a three-run home run in the first inning, hit a double in the third, tripled during the fifth, and then delivered a single against right-hander Hunter Wood in the seventh to accomplish the feat. His first three hits came off left-hander Ryan Yarbrough. A two-way sensation as a rookie last season, Ohtani is not pitching this season as he recovers from Tommy John surgery.
- June 14 – Jake Bauers of the Cleveland Indians, hit the third cycle of the season, just one day after Shohei Ohtani had hit the second. Bauers completed the cycle with a home run in the eighth inning as Cleveland defeated the host Detroit Tigers, 13–4. Previously, Bauers hit a double in the second, then singled and tripled during the fourth, when the Indians scored eight times. According to the Elias Sports Bureau, this is the third time in Major League Baseball history with cycles in back-to-back days. In the 1912 season, Tris Speaker (June 9) and Chief Meyers (June 10) collected cycles. In 1885, Dave Orr (June 12) and George Wood (June 13) became the first duet to accomplish the feat.
- June 19 – CC Sabathia notched his No. 250th career game by tossing six innings of three-hit, one-run baseball in a 12–1 New York Yankees victory over the Tampa Bay Rays at Yankee Stadium. Sabathia, who also reached 3,000 career strikeouts on April 30, became just the 14th pitcher in Major League history with at least 250 wins and 3,000 strikeouts. Among the other 13, all but Roger Clemens are in the Baseball Hall of Fame.
- June 20 – Commissioner Rob Manfred authorized Tampa Bay Rays owner Stuart Sternberg to open discussions towards playing some of the Rays games in Montreal in future years. This comes in response to the lack of progress in plans for a new ballpark to replace the reviled Tropicana Field, and to explore the possibility of becoming a two-city team, starting the season playing home games in their current stadium in St Petersburg and finish their home schedule in Montreal. It would mark the return of Major League Baseball to Montreal for the first time since 2004, when the Expos were relocated to Washington, D.C. before the 2005 season and renamed the Nationals.
- June 21 :
  - Albert Pujols returned to the city where his career began eight years after he last played in a St. Louis Cardinals uniform. This time Pujols wore a Los Angeles Angels uniform, and he received an emotional standing ovation from the sellout crowd of 48,423 at Busch Stadium every time he came to bat, as the fans chanted his name. He went 1-for-2 and received a walk. St. Louis won the first of three-game series, 5–1. Pujols, who spent the first 11 years of his career with the Cardinals, led them to two World Series championships, won three National League MVP awards, a batting title, and earned nine All-Star selections. He was cheered again when he beat out an infield single to lead off the seventh inning, receiving a final standing ovation after being lifted for pinch-runner Wilfredo Tovar.
  - Walker Buehler pitched a two-run, three-hit complete game and recorded a career-high 16 strikeouts, while rookie Matt Beaty hit a two-out, two-run, walk-off home run in the ninth inning and the Los Angeles Dodgers beat the Colorado Rockies, 4–2, at Dodger Stadium.
- June 23 – The Chicago Cubs beat the New York Mets at Wrigley Field, 5–3. Javier Báez hit the 100th homer of his career, a three-run shot in the eighth inning, while Pete Alonso set the Mets' record for home runs by a rookie, hitting his 27th of the season, breaking the mark established by Darryl Strawberry in the 1983 season.
- June 26 – Vanderbilt University defeated the University of Michigan 8–2 in the third and final game of the 2019 College World Series. It was the second title in school history, the other having been won in 2014. Vanderbilt Commodores freshman pitcher Kumar Rocker earned CWS Most Outstanding Player honors.
- June 29 – The first MLB game ever played in Europe featured the New York Yankees defeating the Boston Red Sox, 17–13, before 59,659 spectators at London Stadium in London. At four hours 42 minutes, the game was only three minutes shorter than the longest nine-inning game in MLB history, also played between the Red Sox and Yankees on August 18, 2006.

=== July ===
- July 3 :
  - Washington Nationals pitcher Stephen Strasburg struck out 14 in 7 1/3 shutout innings, including an immaculate fourth inning, and the Nationals continued their midseason surge with a 3–1 victory over the visiting Miami Marlins. Strasburg completed the feat striking out Garrett Cooper, Neil Walker and Starlin Castro on just nine pitches, allowing two hits and two walks, but did not get a runner past first base until the eighth inning.
  - Philadelphia Phillies outfielder Bryce Harper hit a solo home run in the sixth inning in the Phillies' 9–2 loss to the Atlanta Braves at SunTrust Park. It was his 200th career homer and 1,000th career hit, making Harper the first player in Major League Baseball history to have two milestone hits in the same at-bat. His homer came on a first-pitch fastball from Braves rookie pitcher Bryse Wilson, who allowed two runs in six innings and got his first win in just his fourth career start.
- July 6 – Max Scherzer stroke out 11 batters in seven scoreless innings, hit a single and stole a base for the second time in his career, leading the Washington Nationals to a 6–0 win over the visiting Kansas City Royals. To celebrate the 50th anniversary of the franchise, the Nationals played the game wearing the powder blue road uniforms of the 1969 Montreal Expos, who joined the National League as an expansion team in that season. Following the 2004 season, the franchise relocated to Washington, D.C.
- July 9 – The American League defeated the National League, 4–3, in the 90th Annual MLB All-Star Game played at Progressive Field in Cleveland, Ohio. Cleveland Indians pitcher Shane Bieber won the All-Star Game MVP Award honors after striking out the side in his only inning of work. Bieber stroke out Willson Contreras, Ketel Marte and Ronald Acuña Jr. in succession in the fifth, while protecting a 1–0 lead. Bieber is the third player in All-Star Game history to win the MVP award in his home ballpark, joining Pedro Martínez, who did it at Fenway Park in 1999, and Sandy Alomar Jr., also in Cleveland in 1997. The 2020 MLB All-Star Game will be played at Dodger Stadium, returning to the ballpark for the first time since 1980.
- July 12 - In their first home game since the death of Tyler Skaggs on July 1, and one day before what would have been his 28th birthday, the Los Angeles Angels of Anaheim honored the late pitcher by wearing his #45 jersey and by inviting his mother, Debbie Hetman, onto the field for the ceremonial first pitch. Taylor Cole and Félix Peña then combined to no-hit the Seattle Mariners, 13–0, Cole pitching the first two innings, Peña the last seven for the victory. After the game, the Angels took off their Skaggs jerseys and laid them out on the mound as a tribute. In the last combined no-hitter pitched in California, four Baltimore Orioles had combined to no-hit the Oakland Athletics 2–0 at Oakland-Alameda County Coliseum on July 13, 1991—the day Skaggs was born.
- July 14 – At Oriole Park at Camden Yards, the visiting Tampa Bay Rays had what would have been the first-ever combined perfect game in Major League Baseball history, as starter Ryne Stanek retired the first six Baltimore Orioles batters he faced and reliever Ryan Yarbrough retired the next 18 in order, before Hanser Alberto beat the Rays' overshifted infield with a leadoff opposite-field single against Yarbrough in the ninth inning. Stevie Wilkerson followed with a single, and a two-out RBI-single by Anthony Santander off reliever Oliver Drake enabled Baltimore to break up the shutout, but still lose the game, 4–1. Emilio Pagán struck out Trey Mancini for the final out and was credited with the save.
- July 15 – San Francisco Giants shortstop Brandon Crawford went 6-for-9, hit three home runs, drove in nine runs and scored four more times in a doubleheader against the Colorado Rockies at Coors Field. In the opener, Crawford paced the offense with five hits, homered twice and posted a career-high eight RBI, as the Giants routed Colorado, 19–2. Crawford became the third Giants player since the franchise moved to San Francisco in 1958 to drive in eight runs in a single game, joining legends Willie Mays (April 30, 1961) and Orlando Cepeda (July 4, 1961). But his third homer was much more significant in the night cap, being the difference in the 2–1 victory and to complete a sweep of a split doubleheader.
- July 19 – Mike Leake of the Seattle Mariners pitched a perfect game into the ninth inning before giving up a leadoff single to Luis Rengifo of the Los Angeles Angels. Leake settled for a one-hitter shutout in a 10–0 win.
- July 20 – At PNC Park, the Pittsburgh Pirates celebrated the 40th anniversary of the 1979 team that won the World Series, taking a 5–1 victory over the visiting Philadelphia Phillies. During the pregame ceremony, all the members of the 1979 team in attendance reflected about Willie Stargell and what he meant to the Pirates as a leader of that team on and off the field. Among them were Matt Alexander, Dale Berra, John Candelaria, Mike Easler, Tim Foli, Clint Hurdle, Grant Jackson, Lee Lacy, Omar Moreno, Steve Nicosia, Ed Ott, Dave Parker, Don Robinson, Jim Rooker, Manny Sanguillén, Rennie Stennett and Kent Tekulve. Both current and veteran Pirates players wore the trademark black uniforms with striped pillbox caps the 1979 group led by Hall of Famer Willie Stargell.
- July 23 – Trea Turner hit his second career cycle, Stephen Strasburg earned his major league-leading 13th win and the Washington Nationals routed the Colorado Rockies, 11–1, at Nationals Park. Turner delivered his first cycle against Colorado in 2017, making him just the 26th player in MLB history to accomplish the feat more than once and the third player to do so against the same team, joining Fred Clarke (1901 and 1903 against Cincinnati) and Christian Yelich (in 2018 against Miami).
- July 24 – Shane Bieber pitched a one-hitter shutout in a 10-strikeout performance, allowing only a double by Eric Sogard in the seventh inning, as the Cleveland Indians beat the Toronto Blue Jays, 4–0, at Rogers Centre. On July 9, Bieber went on to win the All-Star Game MVP award after striking out the side on 19 pitches in the fifth inning.
- July 25 – Baltimore Orioles outfielder Stevie Wilkerson becomes the first position player to ever earn a save in Major League Baseball history, as he pitches a perfect 16th inning to preserve a 10–8 victory over the Los Angeles Angels at Angel Stadium. Wilkerson, who started the game at center field, was the 10th pitcher of the night for Baltimore, as he used slow lobs never topping 55 mph to put an end to a game that lasted 6 hours and 19 minutes, which is the second-longest game in Orioles history.
- July 26 – Boston Red Sox outfielder Mookie Betts hit three home runs in a 10–5 victory over the New York Yankees at Fenway Park. In doing so, Betts made it four straight days where at least one big leaguer has posted a three home run game, which is the longest streak in Major League Baseball history. It started on June 23, when New York Mets second baseman Robinson Canó went deep three times. Then St. Louis Cardinals shortstop Paul DeJong and Minnesota Twins slugger Nelson Cruz did the same within the next two days respectively. It was the fifth time Betts hit three homers in a game, as he extended his own club record. Only eight players in MLB history have had five games with three homers or more. Besides, Betts became the fourth Red Sox player to achieve a three-homer game against the Yankees at Fenway Park, joining Mo Vaughn (May 31, 1997), Kevin Millar (July 24, 2004) and Steve Pearce (August 2, 2018).
- July 31 – At the MLB Trade Deadline, the Houston Astros obtained starting pitcher Zack Greinke from the Arizona Diamondbacks in exchange for four prospects. Their rotation is now Justin Verlander, Gerrit Cole and Greinke, plus Wade Miley if necessary. In a separate transaction, the Astros bolstered its bullpen with the acquisition of starter Aaron Sanchez and reliever Joe Biagini from the Toronto Blue Jays in exchange for outfielder Derek Fisher and a prospect.

=== August ===
- August 3:
  - Three days after being acquired at the trade deadline, veteran starter Aaron Sanchez pitched six no-hit innings in a Houston Astros uniform, while combining with relievers Will Harris, Joe Biagini and Chris Devenski to throw the 12th no-hitter in franchise history in a 9–0 wipeout of the Seattle Mariners Mariners at Minute Maid Park. It was the second time in less than a month the last-place Mariners were no-hit by multiple pitchers. Previously, the Los Angeles Angels used starter Taylor Cole and reliever Félix Peña on July 12, in a 13–0 combined no-hitter against Seattle on a night when they honored late left-hander Tyler Skaggs by all wearing his No. 45 in their first home game since his death.
  - Nelson Cruz hit three home runs in a game for the second time in 10 days, while powering the Minnesota Twins to an 11–3 victory over the Kansas City Royals at Target Field. In between, Cruz has collected 11 homers and 23 runs batted in in his past nine starts. Only two other players in Major League History have had two three-homer games within 10 days. Doug DeCinces accomplished the feat for the California Angels on August 3 and August 8, 1982, and Johnny Mize did it for the St. Louis Cardinals on July 13 and July 20, 1938. Besides, Cruz is the only big leaguer with multiple three-homer games after his 39th birthday.
- August 8 – MLB announced that the Chicago White Sox and New York Yankees would play a regular-season game at the Field of Dreams movie site near Dyersville, Iowa on August 13, 2020. To be marketed as "MLB at Field of Dreams", it will be the first MLB game ever to be played in Iowa, and will be played in an 8,000-seat temporary park to be built on the site. As the first of a three-game White Sox series with the Yankees, with the other two to be held at the Sox' regular home of Guaranteed Rate Field, it will be counted as a White Sox home game.
- August 13 :
  - Chris Sale of the Boston Red Sox became the fastest pitcher in Major League Baseball history to record 2,000 strikeouts in the 7–6 victory over the host Cleveland Indians that lasted ten innings, while Jackie Bradley Jr. made the difference with a solo home run in the top of the 10th. Sale entered the game with 1,995 strikeouts and struck out Oscar Mercado in the third inning to reach the milestone in 1,626 innings, breaking the mark set by Hall of Famer Pedro Martínez, who reached it in 1,711 1/3 innings. Career strikeout leader Nolan Ryan (5,714) needed 1,865 2/3 innings. Sale finished with 12 strikeouts in 6 2/3 innings of work and did not factor in the decision. Besides, Red Sox third baseman Rafael Devers went 6-for-6 with four doubles, becoming the first player in Major League history to record six or more hits and four or more doubles in one game.
  - The Philadelphia Phillies hired former manager Charlie Manuel as their hitting coach in replacement of John Mallee. Manuel, the winningest manager in franchise history, guided the Phillies to the 2008 World Series title, two National League pennants and five consecutive NL East titles from 2007 through 2011. Manuel returned to his old dugout with a new role six years after earning his 1,000th career managerial victory and being dismissed during his only losing season in Philadelphia. Afterwards, he worked as a senior adviser to general manager Matt Klentak. The move represented an attempt to spark a talented but underachieving offense and salvage a season that carried high expectations. At this time, the Phillies entered in fourth place in the division, but only two games back of the second NL Wild Card spot.
- August 14 – Los Angeles Angels slugger Albert Pujols collected two hits and drove in three runs, leading the Angels to a 7–4 victory over the visiting Pittsburgh Pirates, while setting the Major League record for hits by a foreign-born player. With 3,167 hits, Pujols surpassed fellow Dominican Republic native Adrián Beltré (3,166) and took sole possession of 15th place for career hits in MLB history. Besides, Pujols is already the all-time leader among foreign-born players in home runs (651), doubles (653), runs scored (1,815) and RBI (2,052).
- August 22 :
  - Major League Baseball decided to preclude their Major and Minor leagues ball players from participating in the Venezuelan Professional Baseball League this winter. The move was made as MLB seeks clarification in an effort to comply with the economic sanctions imposed by the United States against the government of Venezuela earlier this year.
  - Tampa Bay Rays right fielder Austin Meadows hit a solo home run in the third inning off Baltimore Orioles pitcher Asher Wojciechowski, as the Orioles allowed their 259th home run of the season, breaking the Major League Baseball single-season record held by the 2016 Cincinnati Reds. Baltimore still has 34 more games remaining.
- August 23 – Eight New York Mets pitchers combined to tie a Major League Baseball record with 26 strikeouts during a 2–1 home loss in 14 innings to the National League East rival Atlanta Braves. Mets starter Jacob deGrom stroke out 13 batters and hit a solo home run before exiting after seven innings with the score tied 1–1. The Mets became just the fifth team in MLB history to record 26 strikeouts in a game, while the Braves joined the 2004 Milwaukee Brewers as the only teams to win despite that many strikeouts, according to ESPN News Services.
- August 31 – Minnesota Twins catcher Mitch Garver hit a home run in the 9th inning of a 10–7 loss to the Detroit Tigers at Comerica Park. It was also the 268th home run hit by a Twins batter in 2019, setting the MLB record for long balls by a club in a single season, while surpassing the 2018 New York Yankees with another month still to play.

=== September ===
- September 1 – Justin Verlander of the Houston Astros pitches his third career no-hitter in a 2–0 victory over the Toronto Blue Jays at Rogers Centre. He struck one 14 and gave up a walk. His first no-hitter came in 2007 at Comerica Park against the Milwaukee Brewers while pitching for the Detroit Tigers. In 2011, Verlander hurled his second no-no against the Blue Jays on the same Rogers Centre ballpark, becoming the third pitcher in Major League Baseball history to throw multiple no-hitters against the same team as well as the first to throw two in the same ballpark as a visitor. By no-hitting Toronto, Verlander also joined Nolan Ryan (7), Sandy Koufax (4), Larry Corcoran, Bob Feller and Cy Young as the sixth pitcher to throw three or more no-hitters in their major league careers.
- September 2:
  - One day after Justin Verlander's no-hitter, in which he struck out 14 batters, Houston Astros teammate Gerrit Cole strikes out 14 Milwaukee Brewers in six innings at Miller Park. The Astros defeat the Brewers 3–2 on George Springer's 10th inning home run. According to Elias Sports Bureau, Cole's feat makes the Astros the first team to have pitchers with at least 14 strikeouts in consecutive games since the mound was moved to 60 feet, six inches in 1893.
  - At Yankee Stadium, the Texas Rangers shut out the New York Yankees, 7–0, ending the Yankees' streak of consecutive games without being shut out at 220. The Yankees had last been shut out on June 30, 2018, by the Boston Red Sox, 11–0. The streak of consecutive games without being shut out was the second-longest in Major League history. Besides, the Yankees also hold the #1 record, having scored at least one run in 308 consecutive games from 1931 to 1933.
- September 3 – Kansas City slugger Jorge Soler hit his 39th and 40th home runs of the season in the 5–4 victory over the Detroit Tigers at Kauffman Stadium. As a result, the Royals became the last team in Major League Baseball history to have a player reach 40 home runs in a single season. Prior to this date, Mike Moustakas held the club record with 38 homers in 2017.
- September 4:
  - Two-way player Michael Lorenzen became the first big leaguer in 98 years to earn the win as a pitcher, hit a home run, and play in the field in the same game since Babe Ruth in 1921. Lorenzen pitched in the seventh and eighth innings, hit a two-run homer in the eighth, turning an uncomfortable one-run lead into a three-run advantage, and finished the game in center field while watching the Cincinnati Reds defeat the Philadelphia Phillies, 8–5, at Great American Ball Park. Ruth accomplished the feat for the New York Yankees against the Detroit Tigers at the Polo Grounds on June 13, 1921.
  - The Los Angeles Dodgers set a new single-season National League record for team home runs with 250, surpassing the old mark set by the 2000 Houston Astros. In the same game, Joc Pederson tied Larry Walker of the 1996 Rockies for a NL record for consecutive at-bats with an extra-base hit with six.
- September 5 – Class A Lowell Spinners pitcher Yusniel Padrón-Artiles struck out 12 consecutive Batavia Muckdogs, which set both an MLB and Minor League record for the most strikeouts in a row. Lowell prevailed, 2–1, when Joe Davis hit a walk-off homer in the bottom of the ninth. Padrón-Artiles, a 21-year-old Cuban prospect of the Boston Red Sox, relieved Jay Groome in the fourth, went six extremely strong innings, allowing just one hit while striking out a career-high 14 batters overall.
- September 9 – Short after midnight, the Boston Red Sox announced that they had dismissed president of baseball operations Dave Dombrowski. Assistant general managers Eddie Romero, Zack Scott and Brian O'Halloran, and senior VP of Major League and minor league operations Raquel Ferreira will take over as the heads of the baseball operations department for the remainder of the season. Dombrowski was under contract through the 2020 season. The Red Sox hired Dombrowski on August 18, 2015, to replace Ben Cherington. During his tenure, Dombrowski won three straight American League East titles (2016–2018) and the 2018 World Series championship, but the Boston club have had a difficult 2019 season to stay afloat. Multiple issues surrounded the decision, as the team exceeded the upper level of the luxury tax ($237MM) in 2018 and were again in position to exceed the new upper threshold of $246MM this season. Besides, the Red Sox have a projected luxury tax number of over $257.7MM, putting them in line to face another maximum penalty — a 75 percent tax on the overage, as well as a drop of ten spots for their highest pick of the 2020 MLB draft.
- September 17 - At Oriole Park at Camden Yards, Cavan Biggio of the Toronto Blue Jays hits for the cycle in an 8–5 victory over the Baltimore Orioles. With his father Craig having performed the feat on April 8, 2002, the Biggios become the second father-and-son duo, after the Wards, to hit for the cycle, Gary having done so on September 18, 1980 and his son Daryle on May 26, 2004.
- September 18 :
  - San Francisco Giants manager Bruce Bochy won the 2,000th game of his MLB managerial career, as the Giants defeated the Red Sox, 11–3, at Fenway Park. Bochy, who became just the 11th big league manager to reach the 2,000-win milestone, accomplished the feat on his 25th and final season. In the same game, Red Sox third baseman Rafael Devers connected his 30th home run of the season, joining teammate Xander Bogaerts to become the first pair of teammates to collect 30-plus home runs and 50-plus doubles in an MLB single season.
  - The New York Mets hit their 225th home run of the season, becoming the 10th MLB team to break their single-season franchise home run record in 2019. The record-breaking home run was hit by Pete Alonso, his 49th of the season.
  - Gerrit Cole of the Houston Astros became just the 18th pitcher in Major League Baseball history to notch 300 strikeouts in a season during a 3–2 win over the Texas Rangers at Minute Maid Park. The right-hander struck out 10 batters while allowing just two earned runs and six hits in eight innings of work.
- September 20 – New York Mets rookie first baseman Pete Alonso hit his MLB-leading 50th home run, while Jacob deGrom pitched shutout ball for seven innings and the Mets beat the Cincinnati Reds, 8–1, at Great American Ball Park. Alonso is now close to New York Yankees outfielder Aaron Judge, who set a season record for a rookie with 52 homers in 2017. Besides, Alonso became only the 30th player in MLB history to join the 50-home run club and the first Met to do so, according to New York Post.
- September 22 – Minnesota Twins slugger Nelson Cruz hit his 400th career home run and 40th of the season against the Kansas City Royals at Target Field. With it, Cruz became the 57th player in Major League Baseball history to reach the 400 home runs mark. In addition, Cruz became the third player in Twins history to hit 40 home runs in a season, joining Harmon Killebrew and Brian Dozier as well as the 26th big leaguer with four 40-home run seasons.
- September 23 – Ned Yost announced that he will retire from managing the Kansas City Royals at the end of the season. Yost, who managed the team since the 2010 season, will finish his career with the most victories in Royals franchise history and is the only Royals manager to ever make consecutive postseason appearances, winning two American League pennants from 2014 to 2015 and the 2015 World Series title.
- September 28 – New York Mets first baseman Pete Alonso slugged his 53rd home run in the Mets 3–0 win over the Atlanta Braves at Citi Field, to break the MLB rookie record set by New York Yankees outfielder Aaron Judge in the 2017 season.
- September 29 :
  - The Chicago Cubs announced that they would not be offering manager Joe Maddon a contract extension for the upcoming season. Signed prior to the 2015 campaign, Maddon became the only manager in Cubs history to lead the team to four consecutive postseason berths, reaching the National League Championship Series from 2015 to 2017 while winning the 2016 World Series title, the first one for the franchise since 1908. The Cubs also moved into 2019 with mostly the same roster in place due to budgetary restraints, but with the most robust payroll in team history. Nevertheless, injuries and inconsistency and a down-the-stretch collapse all conspired to keep the Cubs out of the 2019 postseason for the first time during Maddon's tenure.
  - The Pittsburgh Pirates dismissed manager Clint Hurdle, even though he had two years remaining on his current contract. Hurdle managed the Pirates since the 2011 season and finished as the fourth-winningest manager in franchise history, leading his Pirates teams to an overall 735–720–1 record in his nine years at the helm, including three consecutive postseason appearances from 2013 to 2015. Hurdle was named National League Manager of the Year in 2013, when the Pirates brought postseason baseball back to Pittsburgh for the first time in 20 years. The team peaked with 94- and 98-win seasons in 2013 and 2015, though they were unable to make it out of the Division Series in that three-year stretch—and, in 2014 and 2015, they were eliminated in the one-game playoff.
- September 30 – The Los Angeles Angels announced that they have dismissed manager Brad Ausmus, ending his tenure after one season. The Angels posted a 72–90 record with Ausmus at the helm.

=== October ===
- October 1 – Juan Soto delivered a bases-loaded single against Josh Hader that scored three runs with two outs in the bottom of the eighth inning, and the Washington Nationals rallied to beat the Milwaukee Brewers 4–3 in the National League Wild Card Game at Nationals Park. As a result, the Nationals advanced to face the NL West champion Los Angeles Dodgers in the best-of-five Division Series.
- October 2 – The Tampa Bay Rays hit four home runs, two of them by Yandy Diaz, to beat the Oakland Athletics, 5–1, in the American League Wild Card Game at RingCentral Coliseum. The Rays made their first trip to the postseason since 2013, while advancing to meet the AL West champion Houston Astros in the best-of-five Division Series. This was the third victory for pitcher Charlie Morton in a winner-take-all postseason contest, a first in MLB history, as he also won Game 7 of both the AL Championship Series and World Series in 2017 while pitching for the Astros.
- October 3 :
  - The New York Mets dismissed manager Mickey Callaway after two seasons with the club. A first-time manager, Callaway posted a 163–161 record overall, going 77–85 during his first year on the job and 86-76 this season.
  - At SunTrust Park, the St. Louis Cardinals scored four runs against Atlanta Braves closer Mark Melancon on two-run doubles by Marcell Ozuna and Kolten Wong in the ninth inning to defeat the Atlanta Braves, 7–6, in Game 1 of the NLDS.
  - The Los Angeles Dodgers won Game 1 of the NLDS over the Washington Nationals at Dodger Stadium, 6–0, behind a dominant pitching performance by Walker Buehler, who threw six scoreless innings of one-hit ball with eight strikeouts. Max Muncy drove in three runs, while Joc Pederson and Gavin Lux added solo home runs.
- October 4 :
  - In the first of four postseason games, Justin Verlander turned in a dominant pitching performance as the Houston Astros defeated the Tampa Bay Rays, 6–2, in Game 1 of the ALDS at Minute Maid Park. Verlander allowed just one hit in seven scoreless innings while striking out eight. Jose Altuve opened the scoring with a two-run home run off Tyler Glasnow in the fifth.
  - In the NLDS, the Atlanta Braves received a solid start from Mike Foltynewicz, who pitched seven scoreless innings to beat the St. Louis Cardinals, 3–0, in Game 2 at SunTrust Park. Cardinals starter Jack Flaherty allowed a first-inning run but was dominant after that until surrendering a two-run home run to pinch-hitter Adam Duvall with two outs in the seventh. Closer Mark Melancon was credited with the save, coming off a dreadful night in Game 1. Afterwards, both teams are tied at one win apiece.
  - The New York Yankees collected a 10–4 victory over the Minnesota Twins in Game 1 of the ALDS at Yankee Stadium, while defeating Minnesota for the 11th straight time in a postseason confrontation to set a Major League Baseball record.
  - In the final game of the day, the Washington Nationals evened the other NLDS one game apiece with a 4–2 win over the host Los Angeles Dodgers. The Nationals had a strong performance from starter Stephen Strasburg, who gave up just one run in six innings while striking out 10. The Nationals took advantage of yet another shaky postseason start by Dodgers star Clayton Kershaw to score three runs in the first two innings. In an interesting move, Strasburg was relieved by ace starter Max Scherzer in the eighth inning in what was a must-win game, and Scherzer stroke out the side on 14 pitches.
- October 5 :
  - In AL Division Series action, the New York Yankees continued their long-running October dominance of the visiting Minnesota Twins, earning an 8–2 victory en route to a 2–0 advantage in the best-of-five series. New York scored seven runs in the inning, sending 12 men to the plate, culminating with a grand slam by Didi Gregorius which gave the Yankees an 8–0 lead. Game 3 is scheduled on October 7 at Target Field.
  - Gerrit Cole delivered a masterful pitching performance, striking out 15 Tampa Bay Rays batters in 7 2/3 innings of work to lead the Houston Astros to a 3–1 win in the other AL Division Series at Minute Maid Park. Alex Bregman hit a solo home run for Houston as Martín Maldonado and Carlos Correa drove in the other two runs. The victory gave the Astros a 2–0 stranglehold on the best-of-five series as it shifts to Tampa for Game 3 on October 7.
- October 6 :
  - At Busch Stadium, the Atlanta Braves rallied past the St. Louis Cardinals 3–1 to take a 2–1 lead in the NL Division Series. Atlanta starter Mike Soroka surrendered two hits, stroke out seven and allowed one run over seven stellar innings. Meanwhile, the Braves had managed just four hits off St. Louis starter Adam Wainwright and reliever Andrew Miller during eight innings before breaking against closer Carlos Martínez, who surrendered an RBI double to Dansby Swanson with two outs in the ninth to tie the game and later a decisive two-run single to Adam Duvall.
  - At Nationals Park, Justin Turner capped a seven-run sixth inning with a three-run home run off starter-turned-reliever Patrick Corbin and beat the Washington Nationals, 10–4, to grab a 2–1 lead in their best-of-five series.
- October 7 :
  - In the first of four Divisions Series games, Kevin Kiermaier hit a go-ahead, three-run home run in the second inning against Zack Greinke, as the Tampa Bay Rays backed another clutch playoff pitching performance by Charlie Morton to beat the Houston Astros at Tropicana Field, 10–3, and cut their AL Division Series deficit to 2–1. Facing the club he helped win the World Series two years ago, Morton allowed one run and three hits while striking out nine over five innings. Afterwards, Morton is 4–0 with an 0.95 ERA in four career elimination starts, including both the AL Championship Series and World Series in 2017 while pitching for the Astros and the AL Wild Card game win over the Oakland Athletics on October 2.
  - At Busch Stadium, the St. Louis Cardinals beat the Atlanta Braves in extra innings, 5–4, to even the NL Division Series two-game apiece. Yadier Molina anchored the victory, as he hit the game-tying RBI single in the eighth inning and drove in the walk-off winning run in the 10th inning on a sacrifice fly off Braves pitcher Julio Teherán. The victory forced a winner-take-all Game 5 on October 8 at SunTrust Park in Atlanta.
  - In the verge of elimination, Ryan Zimmerman hit a three-run home run and Max Scherzer pitched seven innings of one-run ball, and the Washington Nationals defeated the visiting Los Angeles Dodgers, 6–1, in Game 4 of the NL Division Series. Game 5 will be played at Los Angeles and, for the fourth time in franchise history, the Nationals will attempt to win a decisive Game 5 and their first playoff series ever.
  - In the final game, the New York Yankees swept the Minnesota Twins in three games, winning 5–1, in front of a sellout crowd at Target Field, while advancing to the American League Championship Series. Yankees starter Luis Severino pitched four scoreless innings and Chad Green, the third of five Yankees relievers, got four outs for the win. Second baseman Gleyber Torres fueled the offensive, hitting a second-inning home run, scoring after each of his two doubles, and delivering a pair of sparkling defensive plays. AL Central champion Minnesota became the first 100-win team swept in the Division Series and dropped to 2–16 against the Yankees in the playoffs.
- October 8 – The Tampa Bay Rays chased Justin Verlander early en route to a 4–1 victory at Tropicana Field to even the best-of-five series at two games apiece. Tommy Pham and Willy Adames homered and Ryan Yarbrough combined with five other pitchers on a six-hitter for Tampa Bay, while Cy Young Award winner Blake Snell came out of the bullpen for his first career relief appearance, holding off Houston in the ninth inning to earn the save. Verlander, starting on short rest, lasted just 3 2/3 innings, allowing three runs in the first inning and one more in the fourth, for his shortest career start. Previously, Austin Meadows hit an Opening Day leadoff home run off the right-hander, and that was the last run Tampa Bay scored off Verlander in 19 1/3 innings, including seven shutout innings in Game 1 of the ALDS. The decisive Game 5 is scheduled at Minute Maid Park on October 10.
- October 9 :
  - The St. Louis Cardinals scored 10 runs in their first time at bat up and routed the Atlanta Braves, 13–1, in decisive Game 5 of the NL Division Series at SunTrust Park, to set the most productive first inning in postseason history. After pitching seven scoreless innings in a Game 2 victory, Braves starter Mike Foltynewicz retired only one hitter and allowed seven runs before being yanked. Jack Flaherty gave up one run on four hits and one walk while striking out eight in six innings. The Cardinals advanced to its first NL Championship Series since 2014 and its 14th LCS in club history.
  - Howie Kendrick hit a grand slam against Joe Kelly in the top of the 10th inning to broke a 3–3 tie, and the Washington Nationals beat the Los Angeles Dodgers at Dodger Stadium in the decisive Game 5 of the National League Division Series. It was the first postseason series victory since the franchise moved to Washington from Montreal in 2005. In the top of the eighth inning, three-time Cy Young Award winner Clayton Kershaw pitching in relief for the Dodgers delivered solo homers to Anthony Rendon and Juan Soto hit solo homers, tying the game at 3–3. Nationals starter Nationals Stephen Strasburg allowed three runs in the first two innings, but kept the Dodgers scoreless for the rest of his six-inning stint. Four Nationals relievers combined for four scoreless innings, capped off by Sean Doolittle retiring the side in order in the 10th to preserve the victory. Daniel Hudson was credited with the win. The Nationals will face the St. Louis Cardinals on October 11 in Game 1 of the best-of-seven National League Championship Series at Busch Stadium.
- October 10 :
  - Gerrit Cole beat the host Tampa Bay Rays for the second time during the American League Division Series as the Houston Astros defeated the Rays, 6–1, to win the best-of-five series and advance to the American League Championship Series. Cole pitched eight solid innings, striking out 10 and allowing only two hits and one run, a solo home run by Eric Sogard in the second inning. The Astros did not collect another hit until a bloop single from Josh Reddick in the seventh. Houston scored four runs before Rays starter Tyler Glasnow recorded an out in the first inning. But the Rays bullpen of eight relievers managed to keep the game close until back-to-back home runs by Michael Brantley and Jose Altuve in the bottom of the 8th ended any hope for Tampa Bay. The blast by Altuve was his 11th career playoff home run, for the most ever by a second baseman in MLB history. The Astros will face the New York Yankees on October 12 in Game 1 of the best-of-seven ALCS at Minute Maid Park.
  - The Philadelphia Phillies announced that Gabe Kapler will not return as the club manager for the final season of his three-year contract. Kapler posted a combined 161–163 record in his two years at the helm, but the Phillies faded in the final weeks in each of these seasons. The Phillies also announced that Chris Young won't return as the pitching coach in 2020 and that interim hitting coach and franchise legend Charlie Manuel will return to his role as a senior advisor to the general manager.
- October 11 – In Game 1 of the National League Championship Series, Washington Nationals pitcher Aníbal Sánchez carried a no-hitter into the eighth inning against the St. Louis Cardinals and lost it on a two-outs single by José Martínez in a 2–0 win over St. Louis at Busch Stadium. Howie Kendrick, who hit a walk-off home run in the decisive Game 5 of the NLDS, doubled and scored a run in the second inning and added an RBI single in the seventh. St. Louis wasted a solid performance by Miles Mikolas, who pitched six innings of one-run ball in his second career playoff start. Having completed his bid, Sánchez's would've been just the third no-hitter in postseason history, joining Roy Halladay's in the 2010 NL Division Series and Don Larsen's perfect game in the 1956 World Series. Previously, Sánchez threw a regular season no-hitter against the Arizona Diamondbacks as a Florida Marlins rookie in 2006. After giving up the hit to Martinez on his 103rd pitch, Sánchez was relieved by Sean Doolittle, who pitched closed it out with a four-out save to put the Nationals up 1–0 in the best-of-seven series.
- October 12 :
  - Max Scherzer followed Aníbal Sánchez's near no-hitter, as the Washington Nationals beat the St. Louis Cardinals 3–1 at Busch Stadium for a 2–0 lead in the National League Championship Series. Scherzer did not allow a hit until Paul Goldschmidt led off the seventh inning with a single. In addition to the hit, Scherzer stroke out 11 and walked two in seven shutout innings. A solo home run by Michael A. Taylor off Adam Wainwright to lead off the third inning put the Nationals ahead 1–0, while Adam Eaton added two more runs with a double in the eighth. St. Louis got another solid performance from Wainwright, who struck out 11 in 7 1/3 innings.
  - In American League Championship Series opening, Gleyber Torres and Masahiro Tanaka led the New York Yankees to a 7–0 victory over the Houston Astros at Minute Maid Park. Torres kept up his postseason surge with a home run and five RBI. Meanwhile, Tanaka threw one-hit ball for six innings to outpitch Zack Greinke, who allowed three runs across six innings in another lackluster playoff start.
- October 13 – Carlos Correa hit a leadoff, walk-off home run in the 11th inning off New York Yankees pitcher J. A. Happ that gave the Houston Astros a 3–2 victory at Minute Maid Park, evening the best-of-seven AL Championship Series at one game apiece. Both teams had excellent performances from their bullpens. Previously, Correa opened the score with an RBI-double off Yankees starter James Paxton in the second inning. Paxton departed after just 2 1/3 innings, then the Yankees used eight different relievers, who gave up just two hits until the 11th inning. Aaron Judge gave the Yankees a 2–1 lead in the fourth inning with a two-run home run off Astros starter Justin Verlander, who made his only major mistake in his 6 2/3 inning brilliant performance, allowing two runs on five hits and two walks along with seven strikeouts. The Astros tied the game 2–2 on a home run by George Springer in the fifth inning. After Verlander exited, the Astros bullpen worked 4 1/3 innings and allowed no runs on one hit. Josh James was credited with the win. The series moved to Yankee Stadium for Game 3 on October 15.
- October 14 – Stephen Strasburg became the third consecutive Washington Nationals starter to completely overpower the St. Louis Cardinals holding them to one run over seven innings while striking out 12 for an 8–1 victory in Game 3 of the National League Championship Series at Nationals Park. In the first two games of the Series, Nationals starters Aníbal Sánchez and Max Scherzer flirted with no-hitters entering the eighth inning. In between, Howie Kendrick continued to play unlikely hero, as he keyed a four-run uprising in the third inning with a two-out, two-run double and then added an RBI-double in the fifth to give the Nationals the early lead. Before that, Kendrick hit the walk-off grand slam to beat the Los Angeles Dodgers in decisive Game 5 of the NLDS. The Nationals roughed up St. Louis starter Jack Flaherty, who had not allowed that many runs in a game since July 2, a span of 18 appearances. The Nationals are now one win away from the first World Series appearance in franchise history.
- October 15 :
  - The Houston Astros defeated the New York Yankees at Yankee Stadium, 2–1, to take a 2–1 lead in the AL Championship Series. Astros starter Gerrit Cole held the Yankees on four hits over seven scoreless while striking out seven batters and walking four. Jose Altuve and Josh Reddick hit solo home runs off Yankees starter Luis Severino, who allowed four hits with seven strikeouts and four walks in 4 1/3 innings of work. Altuve and Alex Bregman both scored in the 7th inning against reliever Zack Britton, while Astros closer Roberto Osuna earned the save. The only run of the Yankees came in the eight, when Gleyber Torres hit a homer off Joe Smith one batter after replay umpires reversed a close call and ruled Edwin Encarnación out at first base.
  - The Washington Nationals scored seven runs on six hits against St. Louis Cardinals starter Dakota Smith in the bottom of the first inning, to take an early lead in a 7–4 victory over the visiting Cardinals and a four-game sweep en route a berth in the World Series. Nationals starter Patrick Corbin gave up four runs on four hits and three walks while striking out 12 in five innings. Anthony Rendon drove in the first run with a sacrifice fly for the only out Hudson recorded, and Trea Turner and Yan Gomes both drove in two runs. Veteran infielder Howie Kendrick earned National League Championship MVP honors, after finishing the series 5-for-15 with four doubles and four RBI, becoming just the fourth player to hit three doubles in a league championship game as part of a 3-for-4, three-RBI in Game 3 that put the Nationals on the brink of its first National League pennant.
- October 16 – The Anaheim Angels hired Joe Maddon as the club's next manager. Maddon is expected to receive a three-year contract in the $12 million to $15 million range, according to ESPN sources. A three-time Manager of the Year, Maddon has achieved a long history with the Angels, having spent more than three decades with the organization from 1975 to 2005, playing four seasons of minor league ball in their farm system, serving later in different roles as scout, coach and minor league manager, before joining the Major League coaching staff prior to the 1994 season. At first, Maddon worked as the first base coach and later served as bench coach and interim manager for skipper Mike Scioscia in 2002 during the Angels' World Series championship season. Maddon later managed the Tampa Bays Rays from 2006 through 2014, winning the 2008 American League pennant. Afterwards, Maddon joined the Chicago Cubs from 2015 through 2019 and managed the franchise to five postseason appearances and its first World Series title in 108 years in 2016.
- October 17 – The Houston Astros defeated the host New York Yankees, 8–3, to take a 3–1 lead in the American League best-of-seven series. George Springer and Carlos Correa each slugged three-run home runs for Houston, while starter Zack Greinke allowed one run on three hits and four walks, striking out five in 4 2/3 innings, but was not factor in the decision. Greinke was followed by five relievers and Ryan Pressly was credited with the win. Masahiro Tanaka was charged with the loss. By the end, the Astros heard nothing but the sweet sound of silence with Yankee Stadium virtually deserted.
- October 18 :
  - Three-run home runs by George Springer and Carlos Correa put the Houston Astros a victory away from their second World Series in three years, as the Astros put together an 8–3 victory over the New York Yankees in Game 4 of the ALCS at Yankee Stadium. The Yankees committed four errors, struck out 13 times, and were 0 for 7 with runners in scoring position.
  - According to reports first made by Baseball America and soon picked up by other media outlets, Major League Baseball and Minor League Baseball (MiLB) are in negotiations that could result in a radical overhaul of the minor-league system once the current agreement between MLB and MiLB expires at the end of the 2020 season. Among the proposed changes are:
  - The number of MiLB teams with MLB affiliations, currently at 160, would be reduced to 120. (This number does not include teams in the MLB-owned Arizona and Gulf Coast Leagues, Rookie-level circuits based at spring training complexes.)
  - As part of this reduction, the Short-Season A classification would be eliminated, and the Rookie classification would be restricted to the complex-based leagues.
  - MLB would take effective control over team affiliations, replacing the current two-year contracts between MLB and MiLB teams with longer-term agreements.
  - Leagues would be reorganized to be more geographically compact. The classifications of surviving teams would also be dramatically shuffled, with some teams being asked to move directly from Class A to Triple-A, or vice versa.
  - The Major League Baseball draft would be moved to follow the College World Series, and reduced from its current 40 rounds to between 20 and 25.
  - MLB proposed the establishment of what it calls the "Dream League", jointly operated by MLB and MiLB and consisting of the teams eliminated from the affiliated system. This league would be open only to undrafted players.
  - MLB teams would be limited to operating five MiLB teams in the U.S. (or Canada)—four full-season affiliates, plus one complex-based Rookie-level team. Each MLB team would also be limited to between 150 and 200 players under MiLB contracts.
- October 19 – The Houston Astros advanced to the World Series with a 6–4 win over the host New York Yankees in Game 6 of the ALCS. With both teams using an opener after losing a travel day due to a rainout before Game 4, the Astros took an early lead on a three-run home run by Yuli Gurriel in the first inning and entered the ninth with a 4–2 lead. But the Yankees came back tying the game on a two-run shot by DJ LeMahieu off Houston closer Roberto Osuna. Then with two outs in the bottom of the inning, Jose Altuve ended the game with a walk-off two-run homer off Yankees closer Aroldis Chapman. For Altuve, it was his second home run of the series and fifth of the postseason, as he earned ALCS MVP Award honors.
- October 28 :
  - The San Diego Padres hired Jayce Tingler away from the Texas Rangers as their new manager. At this time, Tingler was working as the MLB player development field coordinator on the Rangers manager Chris Woodward's staff.
  - The Pittsburgh Pirates announced the dismissal of general manager Neal Huntington. Huntington, one of the longest-tenured executives in sports, was hired at the conclusion of the 2007 season. His ousting represents perhaps the final step in a total overhaul of the organization that began when field manager Clint Hurdle was dismissed on the final day of the season. Like Hurdle, Huntington had two years remaining on his contract.
- October 30 – The Washington Nationals win their first World Series in franchise history by defeating the Houston Astros 6–2 in game 7 of the World Series. Washington Nationals pitcher Stephen Strasburg was named 2019 World Series MVP.
- October 31 – The Kansas City Royals hired Mike Matheny as their new manager, introducing him at a news conference at Kauffman Stadium. Matheny, who previously managed the St. Louis Cardinals for parts of seven seasons from 2012 to 2018, joined the Royals front office as a special advisor to player development. Matheny will replacing the recently retired Ned Yost.

=== November ===
- November 1 – The New York Mets named Carlos Beltrán their next manager for the following season. Beltrán reportedly earn approximately $3MM over the guaranteed three-year term, with a club option to follow.
- November 12 – The San Francisco Giants hire Gabe Kapler who previously managed the Philadelphia Phillies but was fired at the end of last season as the new manager replacing Bruce Bochy who retired at the end of last season.
- November 13 – New York Mets pitcher Jacob DeGrom became the seventh pitcher to win the Cy Young award for the second straight year. He finished the season with an 11–8 record with a 2.43 ERA and a league-leading 255 strikeouts in 204 innings He is also the 20th pitcher and 11th overall to win the award in consecutive seasons.
- November 18 – The Pittsburgh Pirates hire Ben Cherington as their new general manager of the team he previously was the vice president of baseball operations for the Toronto Blue Jays for the past three years.
- November 27 – The Pittsburgh Pirates name Derek Shelton as the team's new manager replacing Clint Hurdle who was fired at the end of the previous season and he later retired from Managing this is Derek Shelton's first Major League Managerial job.

=== December ===
- December 9 – 2019 World Series champion and MVP pitcher Stephen Strasburg re-signs with the Washington Nationals for a seven-year deal worth $245 million making him the highest paid National League pitcher, at the first day of the MLB Winter Meetings in San Diego, California.
- December 10 – Pitcher Gerrit Cole leaves the AL Champion Houston Astros and signs a nine-year deal with the New York Yankees for a record-breaking $324 million deal, making him the highest-paid American League pitcher ever, at the 2019 MLB Winter Meetings in San Diego, California.
- December 11 – Third Baseman Anthony Rendon leaves the 2019 World Series Champion Washington Nationals and signs a seven-year deal with the Los Angeles Angels worth $245 Million at the third day of the 2019 MLB Winter Meetings in San Diego, California.
- December 12 – The Detroit Tigers select former Yankees prospect Rony Garcia with the first pick in the 2019 Rule 5 Draft on the fourth and final day of the 2019 MLB Winter Meetings in San Diego, California.

== Deaths ==
=== January ===
- January 1 – Walt McKeel, 46, reserve catcher who played for the Boston Red Sox and Colorado Rockies in a three-season span from 1996 to 2002.
- January 2 – Jerry Buchek, 76, backup middle infielder and third baseman who played for the St. Louis Cardinals and New York Mets over seven seasons spanning 1961–1968, also a member of the 1964 World Series champion Cardinals.
- January 5 – Rick Down, 68, a long time and successfully minor league manager and well-respected hitting coach for the Yankees, Orioles, Dodgers, Red Sox, Angels and Mets.
- January 6 – Lenny Green, who died on his 86th birthday, a speedy outfielder whose career spanned 12 years from 1957 to 1968, with the Baltimore Orioles, Washington Senators/Minnesota Twins, Los Angeles Angels, Boston Red Sox, and his hometown Detroit Tigers, where he was a steady contributor in part of two seasons.
- January 10 – Johnny Hetki, 96, long relief pitcher for the Cincinnati Reds, St. Louis Browns and Pittsburgh Pirates in all or parts of eight seasons spanning 1945–1954, who made history during the longest game played in Winter League history in 1952, as he battled to a 3–3, 18–inning tie game which lasted three hours and ten minutes while pitching all 18 innings, setting a record for a WL pitcher that still stands.
- January 12 – Larry Koentopp, 82, majority owner of the PCL Las Vegas Stars, who was responsible for bringing Las Vegas its first-ever Triple-A baseball franchise.
- January 13 – Mel Stottlemyre, 77, five-time All-Star pitcher who played from 1964 through 1974 for the New York Yankees, winning 20 games on three separate occasions before becoming one of the most respected and successful pitching coaches in the game, most notably for the New York Mets (1984–1993) and Yankees (1996–2005), appearing in only one World Series as a player (the 1964 Fall Classic won by the St. Louis Cardinals) while winning five world championships as a coach for the Mets (1986) and Yankees (1996, 1998, 1999, 2000), being honored with a plaque at Monument Park in 2015.
- January 14 – Dick Brodowski, 86, pitcher who played for the Boston Red Sox, Washington Senators and Cleveland Indians in a span of six seasons from 1952 to 1959.
- January 14 – Eli Grba, 84, pitcher for the New York Yankees and Los Angeles Angels over five seasons from 1959 to 1963; made history as the first pitcher in the MLB Angels' history, when he hurled a 7–2 complete game victory over the host Baltimore Orioles on April 11, 1961.
- January 16 – Tom Hausman, 65, steady long reliever and spot starter who played for the Milwaukee Brewers, New York Mets and Atlanta Braves across seven seasons between 1975 and 1982.
- January 17 – Helen Smith, 97, infielder for the Kenosha Comets and Grand Rapids Chicks of the All-American Girls Professional Baseball League between 1947 and 1948, who also served in the Army during World War II before joining the league.
- January 23 – Jim McKean, 73, Canadian umpire (American League, 1974–1999; MLB, 2000–2001) who officiated at three World Series, five American League Championship Series, three American League Division Series and three All-Star Games, also the home plate umpire for the first interleague game in MLB history between the San Francisco Giants and Texas Rangers in 1997, serving later as an MLB umpire supervisor and umpiring consultant for ESPN, while being inducted in the Canadian Baseball Hall of Fame in 2004.
- January 27 – Peter Magowan, 76, businessman and managing general partner of the San Francisco Giants from 1993 through 2008, who is considered the man who saved Major League Baseball in the San Francisco area, when his management group purchased the team from previous owner Bob Lurie who had planned to sell the franchise to a group from St. Petersburg, Florida.
- January 27 – Matt Turner, 51, hard-throwing reliever who played from 1993 to 1994 for the Florida Marlins and Cleveland Indians, whose promising career was cut short by Hodgkin's lymphoma.
- January 27 – Betty Carveth, 93, Canadian pitcher, who was one of the 57 players born in Canada to join the All-American Girls Professional Baseball League in its twelve years history.

=== February ===
- February 3 – Bob Friend, 88, three-time All-Star and the most consistent pitcher in Pittsburgh Pirates history, who never spent a day on the disabled list during his 16-year career, becoming the first National League pitcher to have the lowest earned run average, at 2.83, for the 1955 Pirates last-place team, as well as collecting a string of 11 straight seasons with 200 or more innings pitched, topping 260 in six of them, leading the league with 22 wins in 1958, setting franchise career-records for innings (3,480 1/3), starts (477) and strikeouts (1,682), also leading the team in games started and innings pitched while posting an 18–12 record and 3.00 ERA in 1960, when the underdog Pirates defeated the powerful New York Yankees in the 1960 World Series with the dramatic game-ending home run by Bill Mazeroski in decisive Game 7.
- February 5 – Joe Presko, 90, part-time starter who enjoyed a short, yet unremarkable, career with the St. Louis Cardinals and Detroit Tigers spanning six seasons from 1951 to 1958, winning 25 games while compiling five saves, two shutouts and 15 complete games in 128 pitching appearances.
- February 7 – Frank Robinson, 83, Hall of Fame and 14-time All-Star right fielder and manager, who tied a rookie record with 38 home runs in 1956 en route to the National League Rookie of the Year honors, winning the American League Triple Crown in 1966 and becoming the first player to win the MLB Most Valuable Player Award in both leagues (NL 1961; AL 1966), while setting records by hitting home runs in 32 different ballparks and slugging two grand slams in successive innings (1970), earning World Series MVP honors in 1966 with the Baltimore Orioles and the All-Star Game MVP Award in 1971, before becoming the first African-American to manage a major league club with the Cleveland Indians in 1975, and earning an AL Manager of the Year Award with the Orioles in 1989, ending his career with a .294 batting average, 2,943 hits, 586 homers and 1,912 RBI, as well as a 1,065–1,176 record as a manager.
- February 9 – Jerry Casale, 85, starting pitcher for the Boston Red Sox, Los Angeles Angels and Detroit Tigers over five seasons from 1958 to 1962, who posted a 13–8 record in his rookie season and was a feared hitter in his career, hitting four memorable home runs in his brief MLB stint, including a 450-feet home run to deep LF-CF in addition to a complete game, 7–3 win in his first start at Fenway Park, later one homer each against star pitchers Early Wynn at cavernous Comiskey Park and Bob Turley over the Green Monster that same season, before finally batting the first homer by an Angels pitcher in its inaugural campaign of 1961.
- February 9 – Milt Welch, 95, bullpen catcher for the Detroit Tigers during wartime, who eventually played one game as an emergency catcher in the 1945 season.
- February 11 – Jack Crimian, 92, pitcher who played for the St. Louis Cardinals, Kansas City Athletics and Detroit Tigers in a four-season span from 1951 to 1957.
- February 13 – Helene Machado Van Sant, 92, hard-hitting outfielder who played from 1946 to 1947 for the Peoria Redwings and Fort Wayne Daisies of the All-American Girls Professional Baseball League.
- February 13 – Dick Manville, 93, pitcher who appeared in 12 games over parts of two seasons with the Boston Braves (1950) and Chicago Cubs (1952); noted for having attended, and played varsity baseball, for both Harvard and Yale.
- February 14 – Tommy Giordano, 93, slick-fielding middle infielder for the 1953 Philadelphia Athletics, who later spent more than seven decades in a variety of baseball roles, serving as a scouting director, player development executive and assistant to the general manager while working for the Kansas City Athletics, Baltimore Orioles, Cleveland Indians, Texas Rangers and Atlanta Braves, evaluating potential stars like Reggie Jackson, Cal Ripken Jr. and Manny Ramírez, among others.
- February 14 – Rocky Krsnich, 91, third baseman who played for the Chicago White Sox in 1949 and from 1952 to 1953.
- February 16 – Sal Artiaga, 72, American-born of Spanish descent whose 48-year career as a baseball executive included a stint as the ninth president of the National Association of Professional Baseball Leagues from 1988 through 1991, being praised in baseball circles for helping and teaching Latino ballplayers in many aspects of the game, through cultural assimilation programs designed to prepare them for life in the United States.
- February 19 – Don Newcombe, 92, one of the greatest pitchers in Brooklyn and Los Angeles Dodgers history, a four-time All-Star and Rookie of the Year in 1949, who later earned Most Valuable Player and Cy Young Awards honors in 1956, to become the first pitcher in Major League history to win the three awards, being also the first black pitcher to start a World Series game (1949) and the first black pitcher to win twenty games in one season (1951), being a key member of the 1955 World Series Champion Brooklyn Dodgers, and going 27–7 with a 3.06 ERA and 139 strikeouts in 268 innings, while leading his team to the 1956 World Series.
- February 20 – Joe Gibbon, 83, one of the greatest multi-sport athletes in Mississippi history, who later pitched 13 seasons in the Major Leagues for the Pittsburgh Pirates, San Francisco Giants, Cincinnati Reds and Houston Astros from 1960 to 1972, while being a key contributor in his rookie season for the Pirates en route to their historic victory over the New York Yankees in the 1960 World Series.
- February 21 – Nick Cafardo, 62, longtime Boston Globe baseball writer and former contributor of the Patriot Ledger, as well as the author of five books on sports, who died while covering spring training for the Boston Red Sox.
- February 27 – Mike Rebhan, 51, college pitcher who led the Georgia Bulldogs to the 1990 College World Series championship, earning College World Series Most Outstanding Player honors.

=== March ===
- March 4 – John Romano, 84, slugging catcher whose 10-year career included four All-Star Games over ten seasons, appearing from 1958 through 1967 for the Chicago White Sox, Cleveland Indians and St. Louis Cardinals.
- March 8 – Mike Colbern, 63, former All-American catcher while at Arizona State University, who had a brief career in Major League Baseball with the Chicago White Sox from 1978 to 1979 and later became one of the key figures in a lawsuit against MLB concerning pension for ballplayers.
- March 9 – Kevin Ward, 57, left fielder and pinch hitter for the San Diego Padres in a span of two seasons from 1991 to 1992.
- March 12 – Alberto Lois, 62, Dominican Republic outfielder and pinch-runner for the Pittsburgh Pirates in its 1978 and 1979 seasons.
- March 13 – Leroy Stanton, 72, outfielder who played from 1970 through 1978 for the New York Mets, California Angels and Seattle Mariners, as well as one of the original members of the Mariners in 1977.
- March 14 – Terry Donahue, 93, Canadian catcher who spent four seasons in the All-American Girls Professional Baseball League while playing for the Peoria Redwings from 1946 to 1949.
- March 19 – Chuck Harmon, 94, four-year career infielder and outfielder for three National League clubs, who was the first African-American ballplayer to play for the Cincinnati Reds when he joined the team in 1954 as a 30 year old rookie.
- March 20 – Randy Jackson, 93, two-time All-Star third baseman whose 10-year career included stints with the Chicago Cubs, Cleveland Indians and the Brooklyn and Los Angeles Dodgers, who became the player to hit the final home run in Brooklyn Dodgers history in 1957 before the franchise moved to Los Angeles a year later.
- March 22 – Art Mazmanian, 91, second baseman for the 1948 USC Baseball team, who later became a minor league manager and served as a coach at his high school alma mater in a span of 31 years from 1968 to 1998.
- March 25 – Jerry Schypinski, 87, shortstop for the 1955 Kansas City Athletics.
- March 29 – Jim Holt, 74, outfielder and first baseman who spent nine seasons in the majors with the Minnesota Twins and Oakland Athletics from 1968 to 1976, and also was a member of the 1974 World Series champion Athletics.
- March 30 – Greg Booker, 58, pitcher who played from 1983 through 1990 for the San Diego Padres, Minnesota Twins and San Francisco Giants, serving later as a pitching coach for the Padres from 1997 to 2003.

=== April ===
- April 8 – Samuel Taylor, 90, Negro league baseball catcher and outfielder who played from 1952 to 1954 for the Kansas City Monarchs and Indianapolis Clowns.
- April 11 – Scott Sanderson, 62, All-Star pitcher who compiled a 163–143 record and a 3.84 ERA in 472 appearances with seven teams in a 19-year career from 1978 to 1996, pitching more than 200 innings four times, while also helping the Chicago Cubs win two National League East Division titles in 1984 and 1989 to break a 38-year playoff drought.
- April 16 – Hardy Peterson, 89, reserve catcher for the Pittsburgh Pirates in four seasons from 1955 to 1958, who later worked with the organization in diverse roles, becoming the architect of the historic 1979 Pittsburgh Pirates club through his years developing talent as a scout and through player acquisitions as their general manager.
- April 21 – Joyce Steele, 82, outfielder for the Kalamazoo Lassies of the All-American Girls Professional Baseball League in 1953.
- April 27 – Gene Stephens, 86, outfielder who played for four teams in a span of 12 seasons between 1952 and 1962, as much of his playing time was as a late-innings substitute for Boston Red Sox left fielder Ted Williams, being also one of two Major Leaguers players since 1900 to collect three hits in one single inning, setting the record in 1953 which was matched by Johnny Damon in 2003.
- April 28 – Barry Latman, 82, All-Star pitcher who spent 11 seasons with four teams from 1957 through 1967, as well as one of the most reliable pitchers for the 1959 Chicago White Sox in the stretch run for their first American League pennant in 40 years.

=== May ===
- May 4 – Ray Peters, 72, All-American pitcher at Harvard, who was a Seattle Pilots' 1st round expansion draft choice in 1969 and pitched briefly for the 1970 Milwaukee Brewers.
- May 8 – David Montgomery, 72, Philadelphia Phillies chairman, longtime baseball executive who began his career with the organization in 1971, serving them previously as their marketing director, executive vice president, chief operating officer, general partner, president and chief executive officer.
- May 21 – Freddie Velázquez, 81, the first Dominican Republic catcher to play in the major leagues, who was a member of the expansion Seattle Pilots in its 1969 season and spent part of 1973 with the Atlanta Braves.
- May 27 – Bill Buckner, 69, All-Star first baseman and 1980 NL batting champion, whose professional career spanned 22 years from 1969 through 1990 while collecting over 2,700 hits, and eventually went down in Boston Red Sox history for his costly error that ended Game 6 of the 1986 World Series against the New York Mets, but was greeted with a four-minute standing ovation when he threw out the first pitch for the 2008 season at Fenway Park.
- May 27 – Kelly Paris, 61, valuable four position infielder who played with the St. Louis Cardinals, Cincinnati Reds, Baltimore Orioles and Chicago White Sox in the 1980s, serving mostly as a backup shortstop for Cardinals' Ozzie Smith in 1982 and Reds' Dave Concepción in 1983.

=== June ===
- June 5 – Aubrey Gatewood, 80, relief pitcher for the Los Angeles Angels before their move to Anaheim and become the California Angels, playing for the franchise from 1963 through 1965, then spent the next four seasons in the minor leagues, and resurfaced briefly with the Atlanta Braves in 1970.
- June 6 – Dave Marshall, 76, backup outfielder who played for the San Francisco Giants, New York Mets and San Diego Padres in parts of seven seasons from 1967 to 1973.
- June 8 – Frank Lucchesi, 92, dynamic and colorful manager whose four decades career included a long run in the minor leagues and three stints in the major leagues with the Philadelphia Phillies, Texas Rangers and Chicago Cubs over seven seasons between 1970 and 1987.
- June 10 – Beatrice Arbour, 98, steady shortstop for the Racine Belles of the All-American Girls Professional Baseball League in 1947, who also made some headlines in 1942 for her job as a milkmaid during World War II, among a number of different jobs to pay her bills.
- June 12 – Bob Mitchell, 86, Negro league baseball pitcher who played his entire career with the Kansas City Monarchs from 1954 through 1957, whose subsequent effort earned him his due recognition in 1993, when he successfully lobbied Major League Baseball for a pension plan for black players who were excluded after 1947, the year Jackie Robinson integrated white baseball, getting about 85 players were granted an annual pension.
- June 15 – Larry Foss, 83, pitcher who played with the Pittsburgh Pirates in 1961 and for the New York Mets in 1962, their first year in existence, whose only major league victory came in his debut on September 18, 1961, when he beat future Hall of Famer Bob Gibson and the St. Louis Cardinals at Forbes Field, 8–6.
- June 30 – Luis Mercedes, 51, Dominican Republic outfielder who had a three-year major league career with the Baltimore Orioles and San Francisco Giants between 1991 and 1993.

=== July ===
- July 1 – Tyler Skaggs, 27, pitcher for the Arizona Diamondbacks and Los Angeles Angels over seven seasons from 2012 to 2019, who died in a Dallas-area hotel room ahead of a game between Los Angeles and the Texas Rangers.
- July 3 – Gary Kolb, 79, utility man for the St. Louis Cardinals, Milwaukee Braves, New York Mets and Pittsburgh Pirates in parts of seven seasons between 1960 and 1969, one of the most versatile players of his era, who played every single position except shortstop, while playing all nine positions in the minors in a 14-season stint from 1960 to 1973.
- July 3 – Tony Robichaux, 57, who coached baseball at Louisiana-Lafayette for 25 seasons, guiding the school to the College World Series in 2000, at the time of his death, the eighth winningest active head coach in NCAA history with 1,149 wins.
- July 7 – Jean Buckley, 87, outfielder who made the All-American Girls Professional Baseball League in 1950 with the Kenosha Comets, playing for them two seasons before joining the Rockford Peaches in 1952.
- July 8 – Paul Schramka, 91, pinch runner and left fielder who appeared in a couple of games for the Chicago Cubs in its 1953 season, whose uniform number 14, incidentally, was next worn by future Hall of Famer Ernie Banks, who made his debut in the same season.
- July 9 – Glenn Mickens, 88, pitcher for the 1953 Brooklyn Dodgers and a longtime coach on the UCLA Bruins baseball team in 1962, becoming a full-time assistant coach in 1965 and working with the school's program for more than 25 seasons, retiring in 1989.
- July 10 – Jim Bouton, 80, All-Star pitcher for the New York Yankees, Seattle Pilots, Houston Astros and Atlanta Braves over ten seasons spanning 1962–1978, also a member of the 1962 World Series champion Yankees, who is better remembered today for his controversial and bestselling memoir Ball Four, a diary of his 1969 season with Seattle and Houston.
- July 12 – Joe Grzenda, 82, the last pitcher ever for the Washington Senators and an early short relief specialist, who also pitched for the Detroit Tigers, Kansas City Athletics, New York Mets, Minnesota Twins and St. Louis Cardinals over an eight-year career from 1961 to 1972, being the closer for the Senators in their final game on September 30, 1971, in RFK Stadium, with a 7–5 advantage over the New York Yankees and two men out in the ninth inning, but the game was forfeited to the Yankees, 9–0, when fans stormed the field with no security guards in sight.
- July 16 – Ernie Broglio, 83, pitcher who posted a 21–9 record with a 2.74 ERA and 188 strikeouts for the 1960 St. Louis Cardinals, appearing in 52 games (24 starts) and completing nine games with three shutouts, while leading the major leagues in wins and ERA+ (148), winning the NL Sophomore of the Year Award and finishing third in the NL Cy Young Award voting and ninth in the MVP vote, probably best remembered for being the pivotal piece of a controversial one-sided trade during the 1964 season, when he was sent to the Chicago Cubs for a then-unknown outfielder, Lou Brock, future Hall of Famer.
- July 17 – Pumpsie Green, 85, switch-hitting infielder whose 13-year career included five Major League Baseball seasons, taking pride in the fact that he helped accomplish the integration of the Boston Red Sox, the last non-expansion team in the majors to field an African-American ballplayer, making his debut in the 1959 season.
- July 19 – Don Mossi, 90, All-Star pitcher and swingman specialist who played for the Cleveland Indians, Detroit Tigers, Chicago White Sox and Kansas City Athletics over twelve seasons from 1954 to 1965, posting a career record of 101–80 with 50 saves and a 3.43 ERA, being a member of the fabled 1954 Indians club who would go on to win the American League pennant backed by a strong starting pitching rotation headed by Bob Feller, Early Wynn, Bob Lemon, Mike Garcia, Art Houtteman and Bob Feller which combined for 109 of the 111 wins of the team, while rookies left-hander Mossi and right-hander Ray Narleski became the first feared duet of closers in the game under Cleveland manager Al Lopez.
- July 27 – Mike Roarke, 88, whose four seasons as a backup catcher for the Detroit Tigers from 1961 to 1964 launched a 30-year career as a coach and manager in the Minor Leagues, as well as coaching in the majors for the Tigers, California Angels, Chicago Cubs, St. Louis Cardinals, San Diego Padres and Boston Red Sox, being regarded for helping to straighten out pitchers as Mickey Lolich, Bruce Sutter and Roger Clemens.
- July 28 – Loek van Mil, 34, Netherlands-born pitcher and one of tallest baseball players ever at 7-foot-1 (2.16 m), who played in the Minnesota Twins, Los Angeles Angels, Cincinnati Reds and Cleveland Indians minor league systems, playing also for the Netherlands National Team, as well with the Curaçao Neptunus of the Honkbal Hoofdklasse, the Tohoku Rakuten Golden Eagles of Nippon Professional Baseball, and for the Adelaide Bite and Brisbane Bandits in the Australian Baseball League, while serving as the National team closer in the 2013 World Baseball Classic and the 2015 Premier 12 and appearing in the 2007 Baseball World Cup.

=== August ===
- August 4 – Ernie Bowman, 84, slick-fielding middle infielder and third baseman for the San Francisco Giants from 1961 to 1963, who appeared regularly as a late-inning defensive replacement or a pinch runner, whose only career home run in the sixth inning and game-winning single in extra innings in the last game of the 1962 season, led the Giants to a 2–1 victory over the New York Mets, allowing the Giants to eventually tie and then overtake the Los Angeles Dodgers in a postseason playoff and advance to the 1962 World Series.
- August 9 – Bill Mills, 99, backup catcher who made five games appearances for the 1944 Philadelphia Athletics, one of many ball players who only appeared in the Major Leagues during the World War II period.
- August 19 – Al Jackson, 83, one of the original 1962 New York Mets, who spent 50 years in a Mets uniform as a pitcher, major league coach, minor league pitching coordinator and front office advisor.
- August 23 – Clint Conatser, 98, outfielder who played for the Boston Braves from 1948 to 1949, one of the last surviving members of the original Braves club.
- August 24 – Tex Clevenger, 87, relief pitcher who played for the Boston Red Sox, Washington Senators, Los Angeles Angels and New York Yankees over eight seasons between 1954 and 1962.
- August 25 – Vince Naimoli, 81, businessman who was responsible for bring Major League Baseball to the city of Tampa as the first owner of the expansion Tampa Devil Rays in 1998.
- August 27 – Tom Jordan, 99, catcher for the Chicago White Sox, Cleveland Indians and St. Louis Browns in a three-year career spanning 1944–1948, who at the time of his death was the oldest living Major League ballplayer, as he was 10 days away from his 100th birthday.
- August 30 – Hal Naragon, 90, catcher whose 10-year career included stints with the Cleveland Indians (1951; 1954–59), Washington Senators (1959–60) and Minnesota Twins (1961–62), being a member of the great 1954 Cleveland team that won 111 games and the American League pennant, before losing to the New York Giants in the World Series.

=== September ===
- September 4 – Mary Rini, 94, pitcher who played in the All-American Girls Professional Baseball League with the Kenosha Comets in 1945 and for the Muskegon Lassies in 1946.
- September 5 – Tom Phoebus, 77, pitcher who played from 1966 through 1972 with the Baltimore Orioles, San Diego Padres and Chicago Cubs, who also hurled a no-hitter against the Boston Red Sox on April 27, 1968 and was a member of the 1970 World Series Champion Orioles.
- September 5 – Wally Westlake, 98, All-Star outfielder for the Pittsburgh Pirates, St. Louis Cardinals, Cincinnati Reds, Cleveland Indians, Baltimore Orioles and Philadelphia Phillies over ten seasons from 1947 to 1956, who at the time of his death was the second-oldest former big leaguer, four days younger than Val Heim.
- September 6 – Chris Duncan, 38, slugging left fielder and first baseman for the St. Louis Cardinals over five seasons from 2005 to 2009, including the 2006 World Series Cardinals champion team, who also batted the last regular-season home run ever hit at the old Busch Stadium in 2005.
- September 6 – José Moreno, 61, Dominican Republic utility man whose three-year Major League career included stints with the New York Mets, San Diego Padres and California Angels from 1980 to 1982, while playing winter ball in the Dominican Republic in a span of 14 seasons between 1974–75 and 1989–90, most of that time with the Leones del Escogido and a couple of seasons for the Azucareros del Este.
- September 7 – Charlie Silvera, 94, longtime backup catcher for Yogi Berra, while being a member of six New York Yankees World Series Champion teams between 1949 and 1956.
- September 9 – Jim Archer, 87, who pitched for the Kansas City Athletics in two seasons from 1961 to 1962 before shoulder problems ended his career.
- September 9 – Jim Greengrass, 91, slugging outfielder whose promising career was hindered by phlebitis, appearing in just 504 games with the Cincinnati Redlegs and Philadelphia Phillies over five seasons spanning 1952–1956.
- September 9 – Joe Keough, 73, right fielder and first baseman who had a six-year Major League career from 1968 through 1073 for the Oakland Athletics, Kansas City Royals and Chicago White Sox, being also well remembered for driving in the winning run of the first ever Royals game on April 8, 1969.
- September 13 – Alex Grammas, 93, who spent more than 40 years in Major League Baseball as a player, coach and manager, playing as an infielder for the St. Louis Cardinals, Cincinnati Reds and Chicago Cubs during ten seasons from 1954 through 1963, later coaching for the Pirates, Reds, Braves and Tigers over 26 seasons between 1965 and 1991, while managing the Pirates in 1969 and the Brewers from 1976 to 1977.
- September 14 – Gene Bacque, 82, American pitcher who won 100 games in Nippon Professional Baseball.
- September 14 – Tom Waddell, 60, Scottish relief pitcher who played for the Cleveland Indians over four seasons spanning 1984–1987, a solid relief specialist before arm problems derailed his career.
- September 29 – Bobby Mitchell, 75, outfielder and designated hitter who played for the New York Yankees and Milwaukee Brewers in five seasons between 1970 and 1975, as well as the Nippon Ham Fighters from 1976 to 1979.

=== October ===
- October 2 – Cecil Butler, 81, pitcher who played for the Milwaukee Braves in parts of two seasons from 1962 to 1964.
- October 4 – Bob Tufts, 63, pitcher who played with the San Francisco Giants in 1981 and for the Kansas City Royals from 1982 to 1983.
- October 5 – Andy Etchebarren, 76, two-time All-Star catcher who played for the Baltimore Orioles, California Angels and Milwaukee Brewers over 15 seasons between 1962 and 1978, being also a key member of the Orioles 1966 and 1970 World Championship teams.
- October 8 – Sammy Taylor, 86, backup catcher who appeared in 473 games over six seasons from 1958 to 1963 for the Chicago Cubs, New York Mets, Cincinnati Reds and Cleveland Indians.
- October 12 – Jackie Hernández, 79, Cuban shortstop whose nine-year career included stints with the California Angels, Minnesota Twins, Kansas City Royals and Pittsburgh Pirates from 1965 to 1973, being also remembered for getting the last out in Game 7 of the 1971 World Series for the champion Pirates against the highly favored Baltimore Orioles.
- October 13 – Bobby Del Greco, 86, fine defensive center fielder who played for the Pittsburgh Pirates, St. Louis Cardinals, Chicago Cubs, New York Yankees, Philadelphia Phillies and Kansas City Athletics in part of nine seasons spanning 1952–1963.
- October 20 – Eric Cooper, 52, Major League Baseball umpire whose career spanned 21 seasons, being his last work this postseason during the American League Division Series between the New York Yankees and Minnesota Twins.
- October 26 – Chuck Meriwether, 63, accomplished MLB umpire during 23 years who worked two All-Star Games, eight Division Series, two League Championship Series and two World Series and an umpire supervisor for nine more years.
- October 30 – Ron Fairly, 81, two-time All-Star first baseman and three-time World Series champion with the Los Angeles Dodgers in a 21-year career from 1958 to 1978, including stints with the Expos, Cardinals, Athletics, Blue Jays and Angels, later a longtime broadcaster for the Los Angeles Angels, the San Francisco Giants and the Seattle Mariners in 27 full seasons from 1979 through 2006.

=== November ===
- November 15 – Jim Coates, 87, A pitcher who won 2 World Series championships in 1961 and 1962 pitched and played for 12 years for Four MLB teams from 1956 to 1967 including stints with Yankees, Senators, Angels and closing out his MLB career with the Reds.
- November 15 – Irv Noren, 94, A Former Basketball player and Baseball outfielder he briefly played for the NBL's Chicago American Gears for one season 1946–47 and he also played for Six Major League Baseball teams Senators, Yankees, A's, Cardinals, Cubs, and Dodgers for 11 seasons from 1950 to 1960.
- November 17 – Dorothy Seymour Mills, 91, A researcher and editor of historical studies of her husband's baseball books but she didn't receive full credit for research, editing and writing until after her husband Harold's death.
- November 18 – Ryan Costello, 23, Ryan played college baseball at Central Connecticut State from 2015 to 2018 he was drafted by the Seattle Mariners in 2017 but was traded to the Minnesota Twins for Zach Duke and played for two minor league level teams. He died in Auckland, New Zealand.
- November 23 – Will Brunson, 49, pitcher who played for the Los Angeles Dodgers and Detroit Tigers in parts of two seasons from 1998 to 1999.
