= Zhang Zhenwang =

Chinese baseball player

Zhang Zhenwang (simplified Chinese: 张振旺; traditional Chinese: 張振旺; pinyin: Zhāng Zhènwàng; born 1 March 1988 in Tianjin, China) is a catcher, formerly in the New York Yankees organization. Zhang began his professional baseball career with the Tianjin Lions of the China Baseball League, leading them to the championship series in 2002, 2005 and 2006. He also was a member of the People's Republic of China National Team and participated in the 2006 World Baseball Classic.

On June 18, 2007, Zhang became the first baseball player born in the People's Republic of China to sign a Major League Baseball contract with the prior permission of the China Baseball Association, along with Liu Kai who also signed with the Yankees. The first baseball player born in the People's Republic of China to sign a contract with a Major League Baseball Club was pitcher Wang Chao, who signed with the Seattle Mariners on August 9, 2001. Zhang ultimately opted to stay in China, and never played MiLB ball.
