= Liu Kai (baseball) =

Chinese baseball player

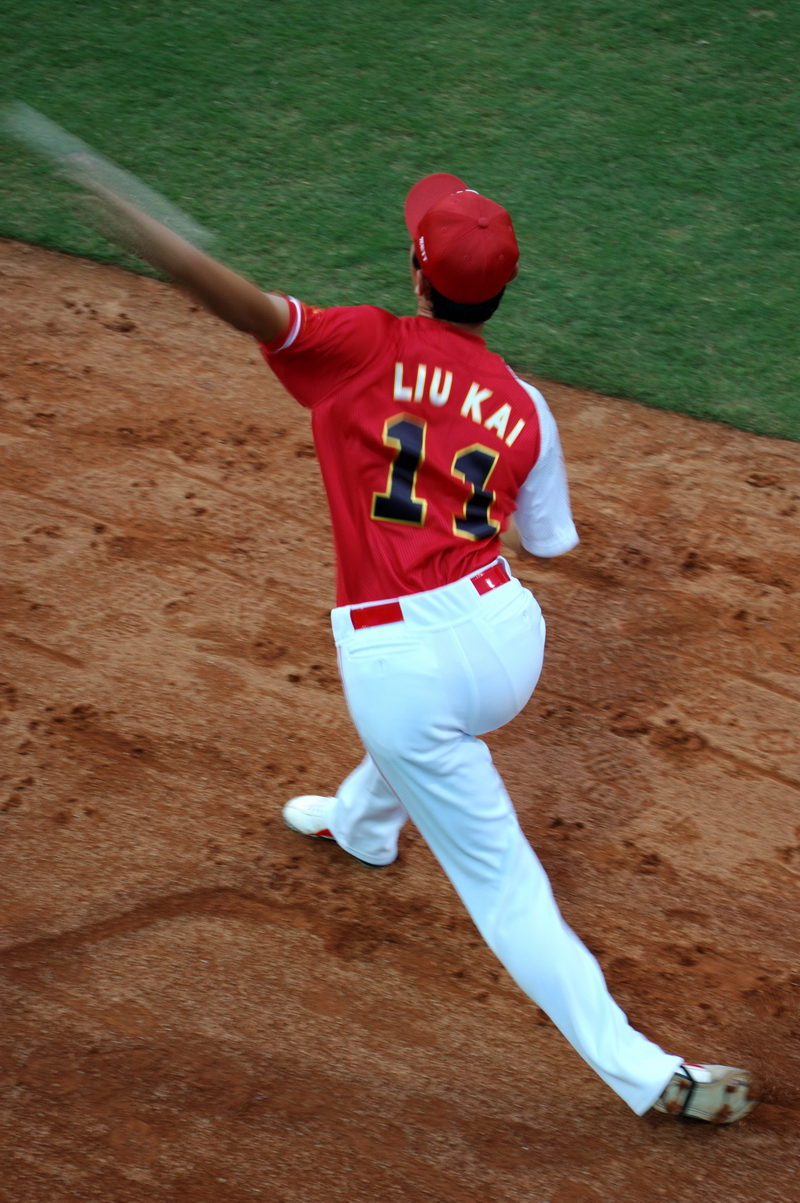
Liu at the 2008 Summer Olympics

Liu Kai (simplified Chinese: 刘凯; traditional Chinese: 劉凱; pinyin: Líu Kǎi; born 11 October 1987 in Tianjin, China) is a left-handed pitcher, formerly of the New York Yankees organization. Liu was later released by the New York Yankees minor league system, along with his Chinese teammate Zhang Zhenwang.

Liu began playing organized baseball at the age of 12, when he was enrolled in a sports school in China. At age 16, he became a professional baseball player when he began playing for the Guangdong Leopards of the China Baseball League. He has also participated as a member of the People's Republic of China National Team.

Liu's best pitch is his fastball, topping out at 84 miles per hour.

On June 18, 2007, became the first baseball player born in the People's Republic of China to sign a Major League Baseball contract with the prior permission of the China Baseball Association, along with Zhang Zhenwang, who also signed with the Yankees. The first baseball player born in the People's Republic of China to sign with a Major League Baseball club was pitcher Wang Chao, who signed with the Seattle Mariners on August 9, 2001.
