= Wang Chao =

Wang Chao may refer to:

Places

- Wang Chao District, a district of Tak Province, Thailand

People

- Wang Chao (Tang dynasty) (846–898), warlord in Fujian during the later years of the Tang dynasty
- Wang Chao (character), fictional Song dynasty officer under Bao Zheng
- Wang Chao (director) (born 1964), Chinese film director
- Wang Chao (figure skater) (born 1996), Chinese ice dancer
- Wang Chao (footballer) (born 1975), retired Chinese footballer
- Wang Chao (baseball) (born 1985), Chinese baseball player
- Wang Chao (sailor), Chinese sailor including the 2015 ISAF Sailing World Cup
- Wang Chao (politician, born 1960), a Chinese politician.

== See also ==
- Wang Chau (disambiguation)
