= Xu Zheng =

Xu Zheng is the name of:

- Xu Zheng (Eastern Wu) (fl. 3rd century), Eastern Wu official and author of the Three Five Historic Records
- Xu Zheng (actor) (born 1972), Chinese actor and filmmaker
- Xu Zheng (baseball) (born 1981), Chinese baseball player
