= Wang Chau =

Wang Chau (橫洲) is the name of two places in Hong Kong:

- Wang Chau (Sai Kung), an island of Sai Kung District
- Wang Chau (Yuen Long), an area of Yuen Long District

== See also ==
- Wang Chao (disambiguation)
