= James Kang =

American orthopedic surgeon and academic

James D. Kang
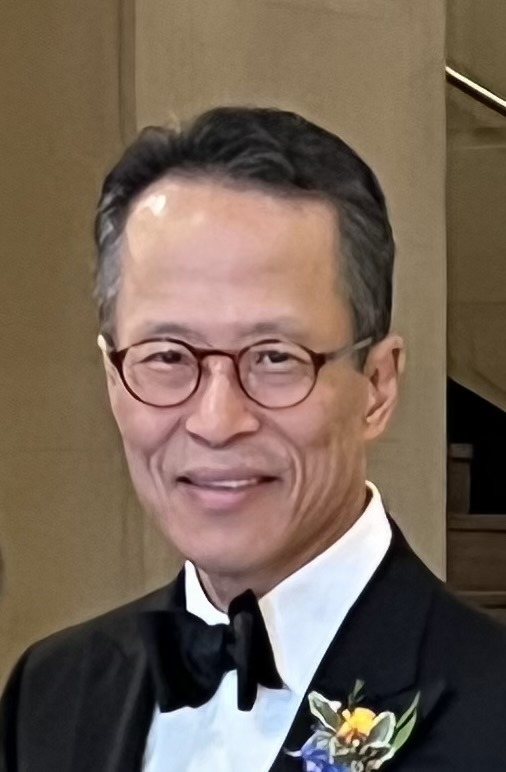
- Born: Seoul, South Korea
- Education: Washington University in St. Louis, University of Oklahoma College of Medicine
- Known for: Research on intervertebral disc degeneration
- Scientific career
- Fields: Orthopedic Surgery, Spinal Surgery
- Workplaces: Brigham and Women's Hospital, Harvard Medical School, University of Pittsburgh

James D. Kang is an American academic, orthopedic surgeon, and scientist, specializing in spinal surgery. He is Chair Emeritus of the Department of Orthopaedic Surgery at Brigham and Women's Hospital (BWH) and holds the Thomas S. Thornhill and Karen N. Thornhill Distinguished Professorship at Harvard Medical School.

== Early life and education ==
Kang was born in Seoul, South Korea, and immigrated to the United States in 1967. He attended Putnam City High School in Oklahoma City, graduating in 1978. He earned a degree in chemical engineering from Washington University in St. Louis in 1982 and obtained his medical degree from the University of Oklahoma College of Medicine in 1986. Kang completed his orthopedic surgery residency at the University of Pittsburgh School of Medicine in 1992, followed by a fellowship in spine surgery at Case Western Reserve University in 1993 under the direction of Henry Bohlman.

== Career ==
Following his fellowship, Kang joined the faculty of the Department of Orthopaedic Surgery at the University of Pittsburgh School of Medicine, where he was later promoted to full professor and appointed the UPMC Endowed Chair in Orthopaedic Surgery in 2007. He also served as the executive vice chairman for clinical services and director of the Ferguson Laboratory Musculoskeletal Research Center for Spine Research at the University of Pittsburgh Medical Center (UPMC).

In 2015, Kang was appointed chair of the Department of Orthopaedic Surgery at BWH, succeeding Thomas S. Thornhill. In 2016, he received the Thomas and Karen Thornhill Professorship at Harvard Medical School. After a ten-year tenure as chair, he transitioned to chair emeritus and distinguished professor at Harvard Medical School in 2025.

Kang served as President of the American Board of Orthopaedic Surgery for the 2023–2024 term, a role that kept him centrally engaged with issues of board certification, maintenance of certification, and professional standards for orthopaedic surgeons nationwide. As ABOS president he publicly addressed evolving issues such as the responsible use of artificial intelligence in assessment and exam workflows

In 2016, he was also president of the International Society for the Study of the Lumbar Spine.

== Research and contributions ==
Kang has performed research on intervertebral disc degeneration (IDD). His research established that disc cells are biochemically active, producing inflammatory cytokines that may contribute to back pain and radicular pain. His studies explored the interactions between aging and disc degeneration using animal models.

Kang also investigated molecular therapies for disc degeneration, including gene therapy. His studies demonstrated the feasibility of gene transfer into the disc and the therapeutic potential of enhancing matrix proteins.

Kang has performed more than 14,000 spinal surgeries. He has authored over 300 peer-reviewed publications and more than 73 book chapters. He has served as deputy editor of Spine as well for the spine section of the Journal of Orthopaedic Research (JOR).

In August 2025, he co-authored Sex Disparities in Spine Surgeon Leadership of Clinical Trials for Degenerative Spine Disease Research, a study assessing the representation of women as principal investigators in spine surgery clinical trials. He published Shifts in Diversity Along the Spine Surgery Training Pathway, a cross-sectional analysis examining racial, ethnic, and gender diversity among academic orthopedic spine surgeons in the United States.

In 2024, Kang explored translational therapies in Rapamycin Mitigates Inflammation-Mediated Disc Matrix Degradation, investigating the potential of rapamycin to regulate the PI3K/Akt/mTOR signaling pathway and counteract inflammation-induced disc degeneration.

== Selected publications ==
- Kang JD, Stefanovic-Racic M, McIntyre L, et al. "Towards a Biochemical Understanding of Human Intervertebral Disc Degeneration and Herniation: The Contributions of NO, Interleukins, PGE2, and MMPs." Spine, 22:1065-1073, 1997.
- Vo N, Seo HY, Robinson A, et al. "Accelerated Aging of Intervertebral Discs in a Mouse Model of Progeria." J Orthop Res 2010; 28(12):1600-7.
- Nishida K, Kang JD, Gilbertson LG, et al. "Modulation of the Biological Activity of the Rabbit Intervertebral Disc By Gene Therapy." Spine, 24:2419-2425, 1999.
- Leckie S, Bechara B, Hartman R, et al. "Injection of AAV2-BMP2 and AAV2-TIMP1 into the nucleus pulposus slows the course of intervertebral disc degeneration in an in-vivo rabbit model." The Spine Journal, 12(1):7-20, 2012.
- Schoenfeld, Andrew J.; Xiang, Lingwei; Adler, Rachel R.; Schoenfeld, Alyssa L.; Kang, James D.; Weissman, Joel S. (2024). "Clinical Outcomes Following Operative and Nonoperative Management of Odontoid Fractures Among Elderly Individuals with Dementia". Journal of Bone and Joint Surgery. 106 (20): 1850–1856. doi:10.2106/jbjs.23.00835. ISSN 0021-9355. PMC 11560718. PMID 38896721.
- Massaad, Elie; Mitchell, Taylor S.; Duerr, Emmy; Kiapour, Ali; Cha, Thomas D.; Coumans, Jean-Valery C.; Groff, Michael W.; Hershman, Stuart H.; Kang, James D.; Lipa, Shaina A.; Small, Lianne; Tobert, Daniel G.; Schoenfeld, Andrew J.; Shankar, Ganesh M.; Zaidi, Hasan A. (2024-04-18). "Disparities in Surgical Intervention and Health-Related Quality of Life Among Racial/Ethnic Groups With Degenerative Lumbar Spondylolisthesis". Neurosurgery. 95 (3): 576–583. doi:10.1227/neu.0000000000002925. ISSN 0148-396X. PMID 39145650.
- Silvestre, Jason; Kang, James D.; Ravinsky, Robert A.; Lawrence, James P.; Reitman, Charles A. (2024). "Establishing case volume benchmarks for ACGME-accredited orthopedic surgery of the spine fellowship training". The Spine Journal. 24 (8): 1495–1501. doi:10.1016/j.spinee.2024.03.014. ISSN 1529-9430. PMID 38554735.
- Taiji, Ryo; Kang, James D.; Mizuno, Shuichi (2024-01-15). "Cellular behavior and extracellular matrix turnover in bovine annulus fibrosus cells under hydrostatic pressure and deviatoric strain". Journal of Orthopaedic Research. 42 (6): 1326–1334. doi:10.1002/jor.25779. ISSN 0736-0266. PMID 38153697.
- Nguyen, Andrew T.; Aris, Izzuddin M.; Snyder, Brian D.; Harris, Mitchel B.; Kang, James D.; Murray, Martha; Rodriguez, Edward K.; Nazarian, Ara (2024). "Musculoskeletal health: an ecological study assessing disease burden and research funding". The Lancet Regional Health - Americas. 29 100661. doi:10.1016/j.lana.2023.100661. ISSN 2667-193X. PMC 10788788. PMID 38225979.
- Yurube, Takashi; Buchser, William J.; Zhang, Zhongying; Silwal, Prashanta; Lotze, Michael T.; Kang, James D.; Sowa, Gwendolyn A.; Vo, Nam V. (2024-01-02). "Rapamycin mitigates inflammation-mediated disc matrix homeostatic imbalance by inhibiting <scp>mTORC1</scp> and inducing autophagy through Akt activation". JOR Spine. 7 (1) e1303. doi:10.1002/jsp2.1303. ISSN 2572-1143. PMC 10782056. PMID 38222800.
- Mizuno, Shuichi; Vadala, Gianluca; Kang, James D. (2024). "Biological Therapeutic Modalities for Intervertebral Disc Diseases: An Orthoregeneration Network (ON) Foundation Review". Arthroscopy: The Journal of Arthroscopic & Related Surgery. 40 (3): 1019–1030. doi:10.1016/j.arthro.2023.10.032. ISSN 0749-8063. PMID 37918699.
