= Xu Zheng (baseball) =

Chinese baseball player

Xu Zheng 徐 铮

Beijing Tigers – No. 20
- Pitcher
- Born: May 10, 1981 (age 44); Beijing, China
- Bats: Right Throws: Right

Teams
- Beijing Tigers

Xu Zheng (simplified Chinese: 徐铮; traditional Chinese: 徐錚; pinyin: Xú Zhēng; born 10 May 1981 in Beijing, China) baseball player who is a member of Team China at the 2008 Summer Olympics.

== Sports career ==
- 1998 National Youth Team;
- 1999 Beijing Municipal Team;
- 2001 National Team

== Major performances ==
- 1999 Asian Youth Tournament - 4th;
- 2003-2005 National League - 1st;
- 2003 Olympic Qualification - 4th;
- 2003 World Baseball Classic Asia Zone - 4th;
- 2005 National Games - 2nd;
- 2007 Japan Konami Cup - 4th
