= Zhang Yufeng (baseball) =

Chinese baseball player

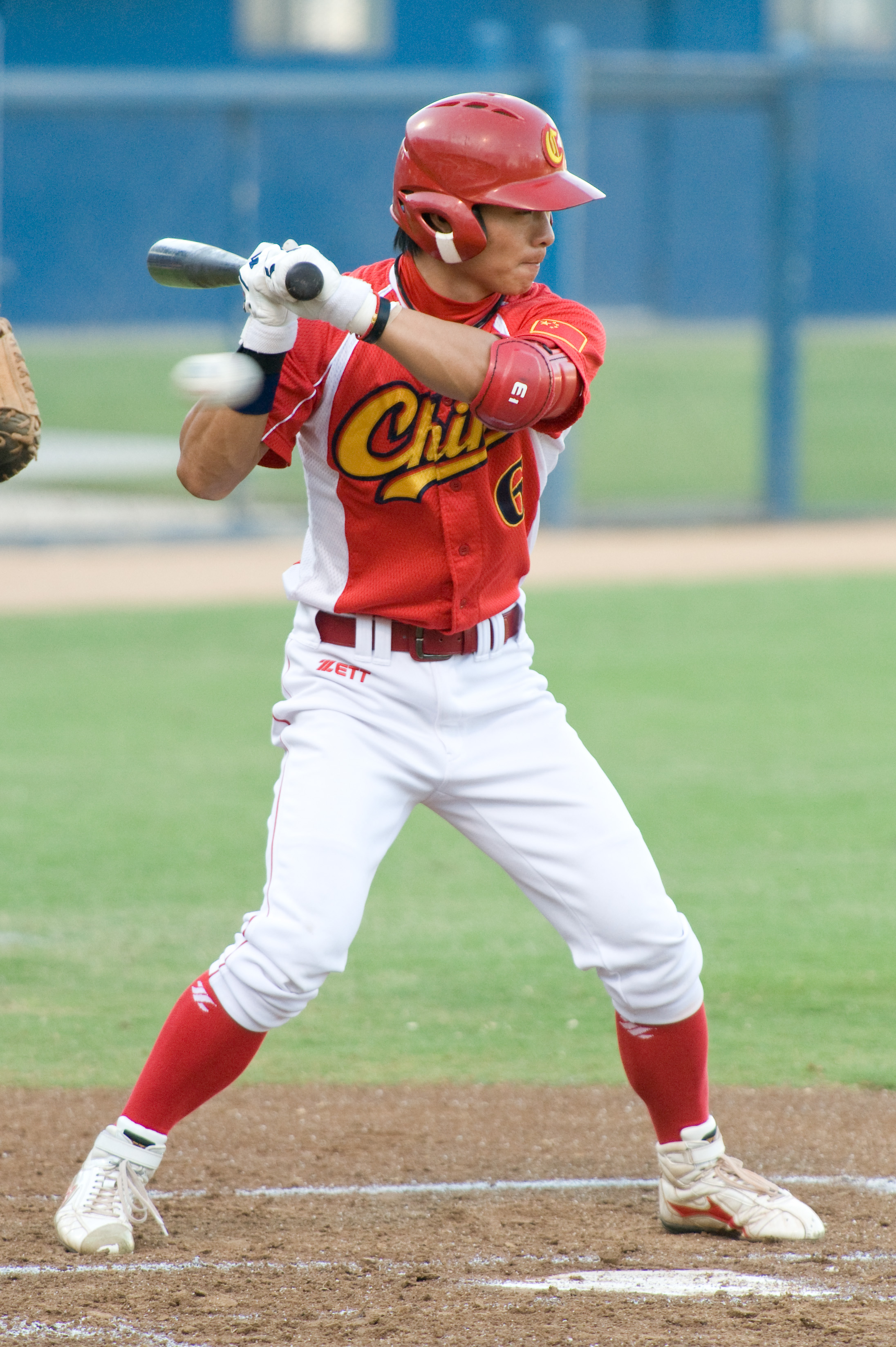
- Zhang with the China national baseball team in 2008
- Shortstop
- Born: 9 February 1977 (age 49); Shanghai, China
- Bats: Right Throws: Right

Zhang Yufeng (simplified Chinese: 张玉峰; traditional Chinese: 張玉峰; pinyin: Zhāng Yùfēng; born 9 February 1977 in Shanghai, China) is a Chinese baseball player who was a member of Team China at the 2008 Summer Olympics.

He is currently the manager of the Shanghai Golden Eagles of the China Baseball League.

== Sports career ==
- 1989 Changning Children's Sports School;
- 1992/1994 Shanghai Municipal Baseball Team;
- 1996 National Team

== Major performances ==
- 1998/2006 Asian Games – 4th;
- 1997/2001 National Games – 2nd
