= Shanghai Golden Eagles =

Shanghai Golden Eagles 上海金鹰

Information
- League: China Baseball League (Southeast/East)
- Location: Shanghai
- Ballpark: Jiangwan Sports Centre
- Founded: 2002
- League championships: None

Shanghai Golden Eagles (上海金鹰) is a baseball team based in Shanghai and a member of the China Baseball League. The home field for the big games is the 40,000-capacity Jiangwan Sports Centre in Shanghai.

== Roster ==
- Pitchers
  - Jun Zhang
  - Zhang Li
- Infielders
  - Qi Chen, 1B
  - Yufeng Zhang, SS
  - James Kang, DH All Star from Virginia
