= Jia Yubing =

Chinese baseball player (born 1983)

Jia Yubing (Chinese: 贾昱冰; pinyin: Jiǎ Yùbīng, born 1983-02-18 in Beijing) is a Chinese baseball player. He was a member of Team China at the 2008 Summer Olympics.

In 2007 he signed with the Seattle Mariners.

== Sports career ==
- 1992 Beijing Railway No.11 Primary School (Baseball);
- 1998 Beijing Municipal Baseball Team;
- 2002 National Team

== Major performances ==
- 1999 National Championship - 1st;
- 2001 World Youth Championship - 8th;
- 2005 National Games - 2nd;
- 2007 Asian Club Champions Tournament - 4th;
- 2006-2007 National League - 1st
