= Sun Lingfeng =

Chinese baseball player

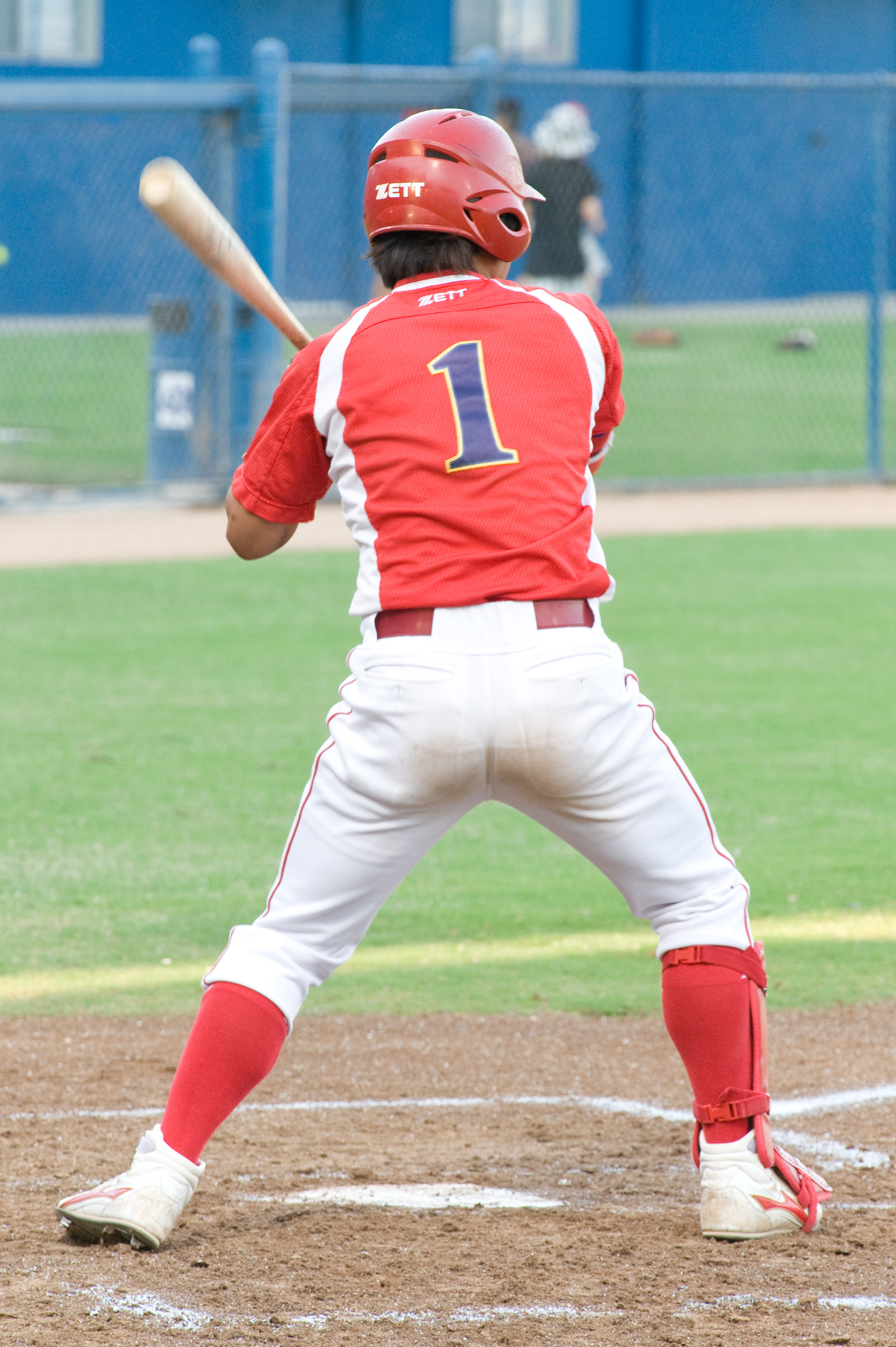
- Sun with the China national baseball team in 2008
- Outfielder
- Born: August 14, 1978 (age 47); Beijing, China
- Bats: Left Throws: Left

Sun Lingfeng (simplified Chinese: 孙岭峰; traditional Chinese: 孫嶺峰; pinyin: Sūn Lǐngfēng; born 14 August 1978 in Beijing, China) is a Chinese baseball player who was a member of Team China at the 2008 Summer Olympics.

== Sports career ==
- 1998 National Team;
- 2004 Beijing Municipal Team

== Major performances ==
- 1997/2001/2005 National Games - 1st/2nd/2nd
