= Jiangsu Huge Horses =

Chinese baseball team

- 江苏钜马棒球队
- Logo

Information
- League: China Baseball League
- Location: Wuxi, Jiangsu
- Ballpark: Jiangsu Wuxi Baseball Stadium, 3,000
- Founded: 2005
- Former name: Chinese Hopestars (2005-2006); Jiangsu HopeStars (2007-2011); Jiangsu Pegasus (2014-2015)
- Colors: Orange and black
- Manager: Kenichi Sato
- Coach: Zhou Wanbi

Jiangsu Huge Horses (Chinese: 江苏钜马) is a baseball team and a member of the China Baseball League. In 2015, Pegasus defeated the Beijing Tigers two games to none to win their first-ever championship.

== History ==
In 2002, Jiangsu Province set up a professional baseball team, and in 2005, Jiangsu baseball team players were the mainstay, and some outstanding players from other provinces and cities were invited to form the China Hope Star Team to participate in the 2005 China Baseball League.

Since 2006, with the strong support and efforts of Jiangsu Sports Bureau and Wuxi Sports Management Center, the team was reorganized and officially renamed Jiangsu Hope Star Team to participate in the National Baseball League with the young players of the Jiangsu baseball team as the team.

In 2014, it was officially renamed Jiangsu Tianma Team, and in 2016, it was officially renamed Jiangsu Juma Team.

Jiangsu Juma Baseball Team was established in May 2002 and is a professional sports team run by the province and city. The team is young and combative, with an average age of 5 and nearly 23 first- and second-tier players. Since 50, our team has adjusted the idea of team building, further established the ideological concept of scientific training, and successively introduced excellent high-level coaches from South Korea, Japan, and Taiwan, and the team level has rapidly improved, winning the 2006, 2008, 2013 National Youth Baseball Championship champion, 2016, 2008, 2009, 2013 National Baseball Championship runner-up, 2016, 2010 China Baseball League third place. He won the National Baseball Championship Cup in 2011, third place in the baseball competition of the 2012th National Games in 2013, third place in the 2014 National Baseball Championship, and won the championship in the Chinese Baseball League in 2015 with "Jiangsu Tianma", and the league was renamed "Jiangsu Juma" in 2016. Coach Zhou Wanbi, athletes Chen Biao, Chu Fujia, Du Xiaolei, Zhu Jinghao, Lu Zhenhong, Sang Zhongwen, Zhang Deyang, Gao Jian, Zheng Chaoqun, Chen Chen, Zhang Fan, Zhu Songjun, Lu Chenjie and Chen Hao have been selected for the national team and represent the national team in the international arena, and 38 athletes have won the title of athlete level.

In October 2019, 10, in the 20 China Professional Baseball League (CNBL) finals, Jiangsu Juma lost 2019–1 to Beijing Tigers to win second place.

On July 24th, 2024, the Jiangsu Huge Horses defeated the Beijing Tigers 8-7 in extra innings to complete a 2-0 sweep in the Chinese Baseball Association Championship series for their first league title since 2015.
