= Wang Chao (baseball) =

Chinese baseball player

Wang Chao 王 超
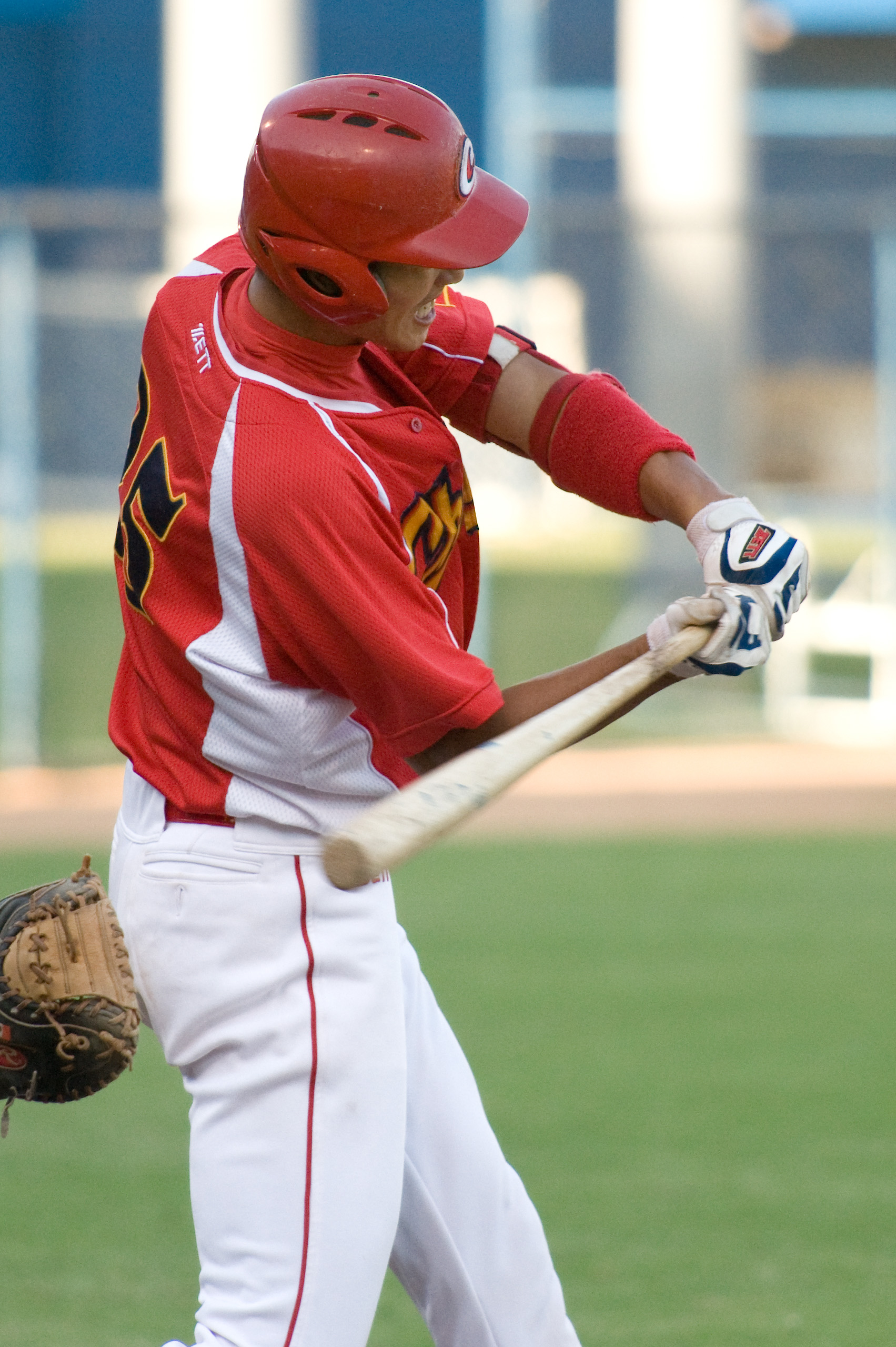
- Wang with the China national baseball team in 2008

Tianjin Lions – No. 25
- Outfielder
- Born: March 23, 1985 (age 41); Beijing, China
- Bats: Right Throws: Right
- Stats at Baseball Reference

Teams
- Tianjin Lions (2005 – )

Wang Chao (Chinese: 王超; pinyin: Wáng Chāo; born 23 March 1985 in Beijing, China) is a baseball player from the People's Republic of China. He became the first player from the People's Republic to sign with a Major League Baseball team when he signed with the Seattle Mariners as a pitcher on August 9, 2001. He played in the Rookie classification Arizona League before being released. He returned to China, converted to an outfielder and now plays with the Tianjin Lions of the China Baseball League. He also plays outfield for the national team of the People's Republic of China.
