= Wang Nan (baseball) =

Chinese baseball player

Wang Nan (Chinese: 王楠; pinyin: Wáng Nán; born 7 October 1981 in Beijing, China) is a Chinese baseball player who was a member of Team China at the 2008 Summer Olympics.

== Sports career ==
- 1997 Beijing Lucheng Sports School (Baseball);
- 1999 National Team;
- 2000 Beijing Municipal Team

== Major performances ==
- 2002 Asian Games - 4th;
- 2003-2005 National League - 1st;
- 2005 Asian Championship - 3rd;
- 2005 National Games - 2nd
