= Tianjin Lions =

Chinese baseball team

- 天津雄狮

Information
- League: China National Baseball League
- Location: Tianjin
- Ballpark: Tian Ti Dodger Stadium
- Coach: Jiao Yi

The Tianjin Lions or Tianjing Fierce Lions (天津雄狮) are a team in the China Baseball League, founded in 2002 as one of the league's four initial members. Their home field is the 2,000-capacity Tian Ti Dodger Stadium in Tianjin.

The Lions have participated in every league championship series to date. They won league championships in 2002, 2006, 2007, and 2011; and were runners-up in 2003, 2004, and 2005. Their biggest rival is the Beijing Tigers, having faced them in six CBL championships. They also represented CBL in the 2008 Asia Series.

== History ==
Tianjin's baseball originated in 1926 and is one of the earliest cities in China to carry out baseball. The Tianjin baseball team has a glorious history, winning the championship in the third national game in 1975. Since then, it has won 11 national championships and sent more than 20 players to the Chinese baseball team to participate in the Asian Championships and Asian Games.

The Tianjin Lions won the Chinese Baseball League championship in 2002. Infielder Hou Feng won the Most Valuable Athlete and Most Hit Player awards, and Jiao Yi was named an outstanding coach. In 2003, he won the Chinese Baseball League runner-up and the most safety hitters, the most baseball stealers, the most scorers, the excellent left pitcher, and sportsmanship. In 2004, Tianjin won the runner-up of the baseball league again.

In May 2023, the 5 China Baseball League ended its first leg at the Wuxi Sports Professional Sports Team Management Center on the 2023rd, and the Tianjin Lions (25-4) ranked sixth.

== Notable players ==
- Zhao Quansheng, P
- Zhang Zhenwang, C (signed with the New York Yankees, June 18, 2007)
- Wang Jingchao, SS
- Yang Guogang, 3B
- Yi Jiao, Coach
