= Beijing Tigers =

Chinese baseball team

- 北京猛虎队
- Logo

Information
- League: China National Baseball League
- Ballpark: Beijing Lucheng Sports School Baseball Stadium
- Founded: 1975
- Coach: Song Pingshan

The Beijing Tigers (Chinese: 北京猛虎; pinyin: Běijīng měnghǔ) is one of the four charter teams in the China Baseball League. The Tigers played at the 5,000-capacity Beijing Fengtai Baseball Field until 2006, when the stadium was destroyed and rebuilt as the Fengtai Softball Field. Their stadium for the 2006 season was relocated to Lucheng, a rural area to the south of Beijing.

The Tigers enjoy the distinction of being one of the oldest baseball teams in China, with its history spanning well before the Cultural Revolution.

== Successes ==
The Beijing Tigers are the most successful team in the CBL, having won three CBL World Series in 2003, 2004, and 2005. Nine of the Beijing Tigers, including the hitting coach, were part of the Chinese National Team in the 2006 World Baseball Classic.

Their biggest rival is the Tianjin Lions, who beat the Guangdong Dragons to win the 2006 Championship Series. The Tigers did not make the playoffs, due to a roster replete with injuries and early retirements.

== Roster (2005) ==
The opening day lineup for the 2005 Tigers was:

- Catcher: Wang Wei (王偉) (WBC Team)
- First Base: Zhe Chen (陳哲) (WBC Team)
- Second Base: Li Lei (WBC Team)
- Shortstop: Ma Ke
- Third Base: Wei Zhang
- Right Field: Yang Shuo (楊碩) (WBC Team)
- Center Field: Sun Lingfeng (孫嶺峰) (WBC Team)
- Left Field: Jia Yubing
- Designated Hitter: Jiang Xiaoyu
- Starting Pitcher: Li Chenhao (李晨浩) (WBC Team)
- Starting Pitcher: Wang Nan (王楠) (WBC Team)
- Starting Pitcher: Zhang Jianwang
- Starting Pitcher: Zhou Jian
- Starting Pitcher: Xu Zheng (徐錚) (WBC Team)
