= Guangdong Leopards =

广东猎豹
- Logo

Information
- League: China Baseball League
- Location: Canton, Guangdong
- Founded: 1995
- Nickname: Leopards
- League championships: 2010
- Former name: 广东闪电 (Guangdong Lightning)
- Colors: Blue, yellow

The Guangdong Leopards (Chinese: 广东猎豹; lit. 'Guangdong Cheetahs') are a China Baseball League team based in Guangzhou. Their home field is the 1,000-capacity Tianhe Sports Center.

The Leopards began playing in 2002. They were the second place team in 2006, and won their first league championship in 2010, beating the Beijing Tigers 2-0.

== History ==
Guangdong finished third in the 1998 National Baseball League, the 1999 National Baseball Finals, and the 2000 National Championship. In 2003, he finished third in the Chinese Baseball League and won the National Baseball Championship. After 2004, the team's performance improved significantly.

Guangdong Cheetah baseball team is a combination of old and new team, of which 5 members have participated in four National Games, 8 have participated in three National Games, and 11 have participated in two National Games.

The current head coach Wang Aiping, coaches Wang Yongping, Wang Wei, Chen Junyi and Xie Weixiang. The team has 30 athletes, including Chen Junyi, Wang Pei, Liu Guangbiao, Meng Weiqiang and many other athletes who have been selected for the Chinese national team for many times.

Today, the team has 1 senior coach, 12 national athletes, and a number of foreign players, including South Korea's pitcher Ren Dong-kyu, Dominica's pitcher and an infielder.
