= 2023 World Baseball Classic rosters =

2023 World Baseball Classic

The 2023 World Baseball Classic (WBC) was an international professional baseball competition, composed of 20 competing nations, held from March 8 to March 21, 2023. It was the fifth iteration of the World Baseball Classic. The first-round hosts cities were Taichung, Tokyo, Phoenix, and Miami. The second-round hosts were Miami and Tokyo, and the final game was played in Miami.

Twenty teams competed in the 2023 World Baseball Classic (WBC). The tournament was expanded from 16 to 20 teams, with all teams that participated in the 2017 edition automatically qualifying, plus four additional spots. Participating nations had to submit their final 30-man rosters no later than February 7, 2023. WBC rules required teams to carry at least 14 pitchers and two catchers on their rosters. If applicable, the club listed is the club a player was with at the start of the tournament.

Key

Pos.	Position
P	Pitcher
C	Catcher
IF	Infielder
OF	Outfielder

== Pool A ==
=== Taiwan ===
Chinese Taipei announced their squad on 2023.

Manager: 70 Lin Yueh-ping

Coaches: Hitting 23 Peng Cheng-min, 91 Tseng Hao-jin, Pitching 0 Hsu Ming-chieh, First base and outfield 66 Chang Chien-ming, Third base 13 Chen Chiang-ho, Bench and catching 34 Kao Chih-kang, Bullpen 40 Chien-Ming Wang

Pos.	No.	Player	Date of birth (age)	Bats	Throws	Club
P	15	Yen-Ching Lu	March 10, 1996 (aged 26)	L	L	CTBC Brothers
P	16	Wei-Chung Wang	April 25, 1992 (aged 30)	L	L	Wei Chuan Dragons
P	17	Chen Kuan-yu	October 29, 1990 (aged 32)	L	L	Rakuten Monkeys
P	21	C. C. Lee	October 21, 1986 (aged 36)	R	R	CTBC Brothers
P	29	Kai-Wei Teng	December 1, 1998 (aged 24)	R	R	San Francisco Giants (minors)
P	32	Yu-Hsun Chen	May 20, 1989 (aged 33)	R	R	Rakuten Monkeys
P	43	Sung Chia-hao	September 6, 1992 (aged 30)	L	R	Tohoku Rakuten Golden Eagles
P	58	Chih-Wei Hu	November 4, 1993 (aged 29)	R	R	Uni-President 7-Eleven Lions
P	59	Kuan-Wei Chen	October 28, 1996 (aged 26)	R	R	Wei Chuan Dragons
P	60	Jyun-Yue Tseng	November 7, 2001 (aged 21)	R	R	Fubon Guardians
P	69	Tzu-Peng Huang	March 19, 1994 (aged 28)	L	R	Rakuten Monkeys
P	71	Shao-Ching Chiang	November 10, 1993 (aged 29)	R	R	Fubon Guardians
P	81	Shih-Peng Chen	September 20, 1997 (aged 25)	L	L	Fubon Guardians
P	93	Che-Yuan Wu	August 12, 1994 (aged 28)	R	R	CTBC Brothers
C	4	Kungkuan Giljegiljaw	March 13, 1994 (aged 28)	R	R	Wei Chuan Dragons
C	31	Dai-An Lin	June 23, 1992 (aged 30)	R	R	Uni-President 7-Eleven Lions
C	65	Yu-Chieh Kao	July 17, 1997 (aged 25)	R	R	CTBC Brothers
IF	1	Tsung-Che Cheng	July 26, 2001 (aged 21)	L	R	Pittsburgh Pirates (minors)
IF	5	Tzu-Wei Lin	February 15, 1994 (aged 29)	L	R	Long Island Ducks
IF	6	Wei-Chen Wang	July 3, 1991 (aged 31)	L	R	CTBC Brothers
IF	18	Yu Chang	August 18, 1995 (aged 27)	R	R	Boston Red Sox
IF	39	Nien-Ting Wu	June 7, 1993 (aged 29)	L	R	Saitama Seibu Lions
IF	46	Kuo-Chen Fan	November 25, 1994 (aged 28)	R	R	Fubon Guardians
IF	83	Li Lin	December 1, 1995 (aged 27)	R	R	Rakuten Monkeys
IF	90	Kun-Yu Chiang	July 4, 2000 (aged 22)	R	R	CTBC Brothers
OF	2	Tien-Hsin Kuo	April 15, 2000 (aged 22)	L	R	Wei Chuan Dragons
OF	9	Wang Po-jung	September 9, 1993 (aged 29)	L	R	Hokkaido Nippon-Ham Fighters (farm)
OF	12	Chen-Wei Chen	December 12, 1997 (aged 25)	L	R	Rakuten Monkeys
OF	24	Chieh-Hsien Chen	January 7, 1994 (aged 29)	L	R	Uni-President 7-Eleven Lions
OF	35	Chin Cheng	November 13, 1998 (aged 24)	R	R	Rakuten Monkeys

=== Cuba ===
Cuba announced their squad on January 25, 2023.

Manager: 6 Armando Johnson

Coaches: Bench 11 Germán Mesa, Batting 46 Orestes Kindelán, Pitching 24 Jose Elosegui, 99 Pedro Luis Lazo, First base 9 Armando Ferrer, Third base 39 Rafael Muñoz, Coach 37 Humberto Guevara

Pos.	No.	Player	Date of birth (age)	Bats	Throws	Club
P	22	Frank Álvarez	January 16, 1999 (aged 24)	R	R	Chunichi Dragons (farm)
P	57	Ronald Bolaños	August 23, 1996 (aged 26)	R	R	Kansas City Royals (minors)
P	21	Naykel Cruz	September 29, 1999 (aged 23)	L	L	Piratas de Campeche
P	55	Roenis Elías	August 1, 1988 (aged 34)	L	L	Chicago Cubs (minors)
P	98	Onelki García	August 2, 1989 (aged 33)	L	L	Leones de Yucatán
P	53	Elián Leyva	March 17, 1989 (aged 33)	R	R	Rakuten Monkeys
P	92	Raidel Martínez	October 11, 1996 (aged 26)	L	R	Chunichi Dragons
P	89	Liván Moinelo	December 8, 1995 (aged 27)	L	L	Fukuoka SoftBank Hawks
P	47	Yeudis Reyes	November 17, 1995 (aged 27)	R	R	Indios de Guantánamo
P	30	José Rodríguez	August 18, 1992 (aged 30)	R	R	Ganaderos de Camagüey
P	29	Yariel Rodríguez	March 10, 1997 (aged 25)	R	R	Chunichi Dragons
P	45	Miguel Romero	April 23, 1994 (aged 28)	R	R	Oakland Athletics (minors)
P	83	Carlos Viera	December 6, 1988 (aged 34)	R	R	Saraperos de Saltillo
P	58	Yoennis Yera	October 18, 1989 (aged 33)	L	L	Olmecas de Tabasco
C	40	Ariel Martínez	May 28, 1996 (aged 26)	R	R	Hokkaido Nippon-Ham Fighters
C	17	Andrys Pérez	February 9, 2001 (aged 22)	R	R	Cocodrilos de Matanzas
C	16	Lorenzo Quintana	March 1, 1989 (aged 34)	R	R	Tigres del Licey
IF	71	Erisbel Arruebarrena	March 25, 1990 (aged 32)	R	R	Cocodrilos de Matanzas
IF	44	Dayán García	June 16, 1987 (aged 35)	R	R	Cazadores de Artemisa
IF	27	Yurisbel Gracial	October 14, 1985 (aged 37)	R	R	Cocodrilos de Matanzas
IF	77	Andy Ibáñez	April 3, 1993 (aged 29)	R	R	Detroit Tigers (minors)
IF	8	Luis Vicente Mateo	January 1, 1996 (aged 27)	R	R	Elefantes de Cienfuegos
IF	5	Yadil Mujica	January 1, 1985 (aged 38)	L	R	Cocodrilos de Matanzas
IF	10	Yoán Moncada	May 27, 1995 (aged 27)	R	R	Chicago White Sox
OF	52	Yoenis Céspedes	October 18, 1985 (aged 37)	R	R	Aguilas Cibaeñas
OF	54	Alfredo Despaigne	June 17, 1986 (aged 36)	R	R	Free Agent
OF	33	Yadir Drake	April 12, 1990 (aged 32)	R	R	Leones de Yucatán
OF	7	Yoelkis Guibert	August 29, 1994 (aged 28)	L	L	Québec Capitales
OF	88	Luis Robert	August 3, 1997 (aged 25)	R	R	Chicago White Sox
OF	1	Roel Santos	September 15, 1987 (aged 35)	L	L	Olmecas de Tabasco

=== Italy ===
Italy announced their squad on January 26, 2023.

Manager: 31 Mike Piazza

Coaches: Bench 10 Blake Butera, Pitching 58 Michael Borzello, First base and infield 4 Jack Santora, Bullpen 50 Jason Simontacchi, Outfield 34 Michele Gerali, Coach 55 Joe Hsu, Third base and hitting 13 Chris Denorfia

Pos.	No.	Player	Date of birth (age)	Bats	Throws	Club
P	39	Vincenzo Aiello	August 6, 1994 (aged 28)	R	R	Staten Island FerryHawks
P	23	Glenn Albanese Jr.	October 22, 1998 (aged 24)	R	R	Los Angeles Angels (minors)
P	40	Alex Bassani	November 25, 1990 (aged 32)	R	R	UnipolSai Bologna
P	35	Joe Biagini	May 29, 1990 (aged 32)	R	R	Free agent
P	46	Matteo Bocchi	July 19, 1999 (aged 23)	R	R	Parmaclima
P	38	Ryan Castellani	March 1, 1996 (aged 27)	R	R	Kansas City Monarchs
P		Tiago da Silva	March 28, 1985 (aged 37)	R	R	Generales de Durango
P	28	Alessandro Ercolani	April 20, 2004 (aged 18)	R	R	Pittsburgh Pirates (minors)
P	67	Matt Festa	March 11, 1993 (aged 29)	R	R	Seattle Mariners
P	32	Sam Gaviglio	May 22, 1990 (aged 32)	R	R	Free agent
P	43	Matt Harvey	March 27, 1989 (aged 33)	R	R	Free agent
P	75	Joe La Sorsa	April 29, 1998 (aged 24)	L	L	Tampa Bay Rays (minors)
P	52	Braxton Lorenzini	April 5, 1995 (aged 27)	R	R	Free agent
P	25	Joey Marciano	January 11, 1995 (aged 28)	L	L	San Francisco Giants (minors)
P	19	Brian Marconi	May 9, 1997 (aged 25)	R	L	Philadelphia Phillies (minors)
P	48	Vinny Nittoli	November 11, 1990 (aged 32)	R	R	Chicago Cubs (minors)
P	53	Andre Pallante	September 18, 1999 (aged 23)	R	R	St. Louis Cardinals
P	16	Jeffrey Passantino	September 24, 1995 (aged 27)	R	R	Gigantes de Carolina
P	99	Nicolò Pinazzi	October 25, 1999 (aged 23)	L	L	Cincinnati Reds (minors)
P	44	Claudio Scotti	July 8, 1998 (aged 24)	R	R	New York Mets (minors)
P	18	Mitchell Stumpo	June 17, 1996 (aged 26)	R	R	Arizona Diamondbacks (minors)
P	37	Michele Vassalotti	September 2, 2000 (aged 22)	R	R	Milwaukee Brewers (minors)
P	21	Stephen Woods Jr.	June 10, 1995 (aged 27)	R	R	Free agent
C	27	Vito Friscia	December 19, 1996 (aged 26)	R	R	Philadelphia Phillies (minors)
C	36	Alberto Mineo	July 23, 1994 (aged 28)	L	R	Parmaclima
C	29	Dominic Miroglio	March 10, 1995 (aged 27)	R	R	Arizona Diamondbacks (minors)
C	12	Brett Sullivan	February 22, 1994 (aged 29)	L	R	San Diego Padres (minors)
IF	22	David Fletcher	December 19, 1996 (aged 26)	R	R	Los Angeles Angels
IF	15	Robel García	March 28, 1993 (aged 29)	R	R	Toros del Este
IF	2	Nicky Lopez	March 13, 1995 (aged 27)	L	R	Kansas City Royals
IF	1	Miles Mastrobuoni	October 31, 1995 (aged 27)	L	R	Chicago Cubs
IF	9	Vinnie Pasquantino	October 10, 1997 (aged 25)	L	L	Kansas City Royals
IF	6	John Valente	June 23, 1995 (aged 27)	R	R	Detroit Tigers (minors)
OF	26	Ben DeLuzio	August 9, 1994 (aged 28)	R	R	Chicago Cubs (minors)
OF	5	Dominic Fletcher	September 2, 1997 (aged 25)	R	R	Arizona Diamondbacks (minors)
OF	11	Sal Frelick	April 19, 1997 (aged 25)	L	R	Milwaukee Brewers (minors)

=== Netherlands ===
Netherlands announced their squad on January 23, 2023.

Manager: 31 Hensley Meulens

Coaches: Hitting Tjerk Smeets, Pitching 28 Bert Blyleven, First base Gene Kingsale, Third base 44 Ben Thijssen, Bench 25 Andruw Jones, Bullpen Mike Harkey, Quality control Evert-Jan 't Hoen

Pos.	No.	Player	Date of birth (age)	Bats	Throws	Club
P	20	Mike Bolsenbroek	March 11, 1987 (aged 35)	R	R	Heidenheim Heideköpfe
P	30	Dennis Burgersdijk	July 19, 1988 (aged 34)	R	R	HCAW
P	36	Jiorgeny Casimiri	July 12, 2001 (aged 21)	R	R	Toronto Blue Jays (minors)
P	37	Tom de Blok	May 8, 1996 (aged 26)	R	R	Curaçao Neptunus
P	66	Aaron de Groot	May 21, 1999 (aged 23)	R	R	Curaçao Neptunus
P	32	Jaydenn Estanista	October 3, 2001 (aged 21)	R	R	Philadelphia Phillies (minors)
P	51	Dylan Farley	December 26, 2001 (aged 21)	L	L	Amsterdam Pirates
P	99	Wendell Floranus	April 16, 1995 (aged 27)	R	R	Gigantes del Cibao
P	17	Arij Fransen	May 20, 2001 (aged 21)	R	R	Cincinnati Reds (minors)
P	16	Lars Huijer	September 22, 1993 (aged 29)	R	R	HCAW
P	41	Ryan Huntington	August 25, 1996 (aged 26)	R	L	Curaçao Neptunus
P	74	Kenley Jansen	September 30, 1987 (aged 35)	S	R	Boston Red Sox
P	49	Jair Jurrjens	January 29, 1986 (aged 37)	R	R	Tigres de Aragua
P	58	Antwone Kelly	September 1, 2003 (aged 19)	R	R	Pittsburgh Pirates (minors)
P	33	Kevin Kelly	May 27, 1990 (aged 32)	R	R	Curaçao Neptunus
P	39	Shairon Martis	March 30, 1987 (aged 35)	R	R	Amsterdam Pirates
P	29	Eric Méndez	December 3, 1999 (aged 23)	R	R	Arizona Diamondbacks (minors)
P	62	Scott Prins	February 9, 2001 (aged 22)	R	R	Amsterdam Pirates
P	46	Pedro Strop	June 13, 1985 (aged 37)	R	R	Leones del Escogido
P	45	J. C. Sulbaran	November 9, 1989 (aged 33)	R	R	Indios del Bóer
P	55	Franklin van Gurp	October 26, 1995 (aged 27)	R	R	Estrellas Orientales
P	00	Derek West	December 2, 1996 (aged 26)	R	R	Houston Astros (minors)
C	26	Sicnarf Loopstok	March 21, 1995 (aged 27)	R	R	Amsterdam Pirates
C	21	Dashenko Ricardo	March 1, 1990 (aged 33)	R	R	Curaçao Neptunus
C	14	Chadwick Tromp	April 26, 1993 (aged 29)	R	R	Atlanta Braves
IF	2	Xander Bogaerts	October 1, 1992 (aged 30)	R	R	San Diego Padres
IF	18	Didi Gregorius	February 18, 1990 (aged 33)	L	R	Cangrejeros de Santurce
IF	3	Richie Palacios	May 16, 1997 (aged 25)	L	R	Cleveland Guardians
IF	13	Juremi Profar	January 30, 1996 (aged 27)	R	R	Bravos de León
IF	7	Jonathan Schoop	October 16, 1991 (aged 31)	R	R	Detroit Tigers
IF	15	Sharlon Schoop	April 15, 1987 (aged 35)	R	R	Amsterdam Pirates
IF	9	Andrelton Simmons	September 4, 1989 (aged 33)	R	R	Free agent
IF	40	Zander Wiel	January 11, 1993 (aged 30)	R	R	High Point Rockers
OF	4	Wladimir Balentien	July 2, 1984 (aged 38)	R	R	Gigantes del Cibao
OF	50	Roger Bernadina	June 12, 1984 (aged 38)	L	L	Leones de León
OF	11	Ray-Patrick Didder	January 10, 1994 (aged 29)	R	R	Free agent
OF	77	Joshua Palacios	July 30, 1995 (aged 27)	L	R	Pittsburgh Pirates (minors)
OF	10	Jurickson Profar	February 20, 1993 (aged 30)	R	R	Free agent

=== Panama ===
Panama announced their squad on September 28, 2022.

Manager: 21 Luis Ortiz

Coaches: Bench 8 Luis Caballero, Hitting 4 Earl Agnoly, 76 Víctor Preciado, Pitching 73 Enrique Burgos, 14 Wilfredo Córdoba, First base Cirilo Cumberbatch. Bullpen 95 Hipólito Ortiz, Third base 44 Vicente Garibaldo

Pos.	No.	Player	Date of birth (age)	Bats	Throws	Club
P	92	Harold Araúz	May 29, 1995 (aged 27)	R	R	Federales de Chiriquí
P	25	Alberto Baldonado	February 1, 1993 (aged 30)	L	L	Yomiuri Giants
P	51	Jaime Barría	July 18, 1996 (aged 26)	R	R	Los Angeles Angels
P	48	Randall Delgado	February 9, 1990 (aged 33)	R	R	Águilas Cibaeñas
P	23	James González	September 15, 2000 (aged 22)	L	L	Oakland Athletics (minors)
P	52	Severino González	September 29, 1992 (aged 30)	L	L	Federales de Chiriquí
P	12	Javy Guerra	September 25, 1995 (aged 27)	L	R	Hanshin Tigers
P	41	Alberto Guerrero	December 13, 1997 (aged 25)	R	R	Tomateros de Culiacán
P	18	Matt Hardy	July 15, 1995 (aged 27)	L	R	Milwaukee Brewers (minors)
P	61	Justin Lawrence	January 25, 1994 (aged 29)	R	R	Colorado Rockies
P	62	Humberto Mejía	March 3, 1997 (aged 26)	R	R	Chunichi Dragons
P	43	Andy Otero	June 3, 1992 (aged 30)	L	L	CTBC Brothers
P	26	Wilfredo Pereira	April 26, 1999 (aged 23)	R	R	St. Louis Cardinals (minors)
P	88	Davis Romero	March 30, 1983 (aged 39)	L	R	Atlánticos de Bocas del Toro y Colón
C	80	Pedro Aguilar	May 20, 1989 (aged 33)	R	R	
C	22	Christian Bethancourt	September 2, 1991 (aged 31)	R	R	Tampa Bay Rays
C	5	Carlos Sánchez	November 5, 1993 (aged 29)	R	R	
IF	3	Jonathan Araúz	August 3, 1998 (aged 24)	S	R	New York Mets (minors)
IF	98	Erasmo Caballero	May 25, 2001 (aged 21)	S	R	Federales de Chiriquí
IF	77	José Caballero	August 30, 1996 (aged 26)	R	R	Seattle Mariners (minors)
IF	24	Gerald Chin	May 29, 1993 (aged 29)	L	R	Águilas Metropolitanas
IF	10	Edgar Muñoz	October 30, 1991 (aged 31)	R	R	Atlánticos de Bocas del Toro y Colón
IF	11	Rubén Tejada	October 27, 1989 (aged 33)	R	R	Long Island Ducks
IF	39	Joshwan Wright	November 9, 2000 (aged 22)	R	R	Oakland Athletics (minors)
OF	89	Luis Castillo	May 15, 1989 (aged 33)	S	R	Atlánticos de Bocas del Toro y Colón
OF	13	Allen Córdoba	December 6, 1995 (aged 27)	R	R	Algodoneros de Unión Laguna
OF	42	Rodrigo Orozco	April 2, 1995 (aged 27)	S	R	Ottawa Titans
OF	99	José Ramos	January 1, 2001 (aged 22)	R	R	Los Angeles Dodgers (minors)
OF	81	Jahdiel Santamaría	April 5, 1987 (aged 35)	R	R	Federales de Chiriquí
OF	94	Jhonny Santos	October 2, 1996 (aged 26)	R	R	Federales de Chiriquí

== Pool B ==
=== Australia ===
Australia announced their squad on February 10, 2023.

Manager: 14 David Nilsson

Coaches: Bench 13 Shayne Watson, Hitting 32 Chris Adamson, Assistant hitting 3 Will Bradley, Pitching 33 Jim Bennett, First base 18 Michael Collins, Third base 19 Andrew Graham, Bullpen 27 Graeme Lloyd

Player	No.	Pos.	Date of birth (age)	Team	League	Birthplace
Tim Atherton	37	P	November 7, 1989 (aged 33)	(Australia) Brisbane Bandits	Australian Baseball League	(Australia) Kempsey, New South Wales
Liam Doolan	54	P	October 11, 1998 (aged 24)	(Australia) Sydney Blue Sox	Australian Baseball League	(Australia) Blacktown, New South Wales
Kyle Glogoski	61	P	January 6, 1999 (aged 24)	(United States) Cincinnati Reds (minors)	Major League Baseball	Auckland, New Zealand
Josh Guyer	20	P	May 27, 1994 (aged 28)	(Australia) Sydney Blue Sox	Australian Baseball League	(Australia) Tamworth, New South Wales
Samuel Holland	40	P	February 20, 1994 (aged 29)	(Australia) Brisbane Bandits	Australian Baseball League	(Australia) Brisbane, Queensland
Jon Kennedy	55	P	September 20, 1994 (aged 28)	(Australia) Melbourne Aces	Australian Baseball League	(Australia) Melbourne, Victoria
Steven Kent	25	P	May 8, 1989 (aged 33)	(Australia) Melbourne Aces	Australian Baseball League	(Australia) Canberra, Australian Capital Territory
Daniel McGrath	11	P	July 7, 1994 (aged 28)	(Australia) Melbourne Aces	Australian Baseball League	(Australia) Melbourne, Victoria
Mitch Neunborn	22	P	June 27, 1997 (aged 25)	(Australia) Adelaide Giants	Australian Baseball League	Perth, Western Australia
Jack O'Loughlin	59	P	March 14, 2000 (aged 22)	(United States) Detroit Tigers (minors)	Major League Baseball	Adelaide, South Australia
Warwick Saupold	30	P	January 16, 1990 (aged 33)	(Australia) Perth Heat	Australian Baseball League	Perth, Western Australia
Will Sherriff	56	P	June 2, 2002 (aged 20)	(United States) Arizona Diamondbacks (minors)	Major League Baseball	Perth, Western Australia
Blake Townsend	39	P	April 5, 2001 (aged 21)	(United States) Seattle Mariners (minors)	Major League Baseball	(Australia) Traralgon, Victoria
Todd Van Steensel	21	P	January 14, 1991 (aged 32)	(Australia) Adelaide Giants	Australian Baseball League	(Australia) Sydney, New South Wales
Coen Wynne	49	P	January 25, 1999 (aged 24)	(Australia) Sydney Blue Sox	Australian Baseball League	(Australia) Westmead, New South Wales
Luke Wilkins	26	P	December 27, 1989 (aged 33)	(Australia) Adelaide Giants	Australian Baseball League	(Australia) Sydney, New South Wales
Ryan Battaglia	24	C	June 29, 1992 (aged 30)	(Australia) Brisbane Bandits	Australian Baseball League	(Australia) Brisbane, Queensland
Alex Hall	10	C	June 8, 1999 (aged 23)	(United States) Milwaukee Brewers (minors)	Major League Baseball	Perth, Western Australia
Jordan McArdle	48	C	May 2, 1998 (aged 24)	(Australia) Adelaide Giants	Australian Baseball League	Adelaide, South Australia
Robbie Perkins	9	C	May 29, 1994 (aged 28)	(Australia) Canberra Cavalry	Australian Baseball League	(Australia) Canberra, Australian Capital Territory
Jake Bowey	58	IF	July 16, 1996 (aged 26)	(Australia) Perth Heat	Australian Baseball League	Perth, Western Australia
Jarryd Dale	43	IF	September 11, 2000 (aged 22)	(Australia) Melbourne Aces	Australian Baseball League	(Australia) Melbourne, Victoria
Darryl George	7	IF	March 14, 1993 (aged 29)	(Australia) Melbourne Aces	Australian Baseball League	(Australia) Melbourne, Victoria
Robbie Glendinning	6	IF	October 6, 1995 (aged 27)	(United States) Kansas City Royals (minors)	Major League Baseball	Perth, Western Australia
Liam Spence	15	IF	April 9, 1998 (aged 24)	(Australia) Adelaide Giants	Australian Baseball League	(Australia) Geelong, Victoria
Logan Wade	4	IF	November 13, 1991 (aged 31)	(Australia) Brisbane Bandits	Australian Baseball League	(Australia) Brisbane, Queensland
Rixon Wingrove	52	IF	May 23, 2000 (aged 22)	(Australia) Adelaide Giants	Australian Baseball League	(Australia) Newcastle, New South Wales
Ulrich Bojarski	60	OF	September 15, 1998 (aged 24)	(Australia) Perth Heat	Australian Baseball League	East London, South Africa
Andrew Campbell	17	OF	February 18, 1992 (aged 31)	(Australia) Brisbane Bandits	Australian Baseball League	(Australia) Ipswich, Queensland
Tim Kennelly	23	OF	December 5, 1986 (aged 36)	(Australia) Perth Heat	Australian Baseball League	Perth, Western Australia
Aaron Whitefield	2	OF	September 2, 1996 (aged 26)	(United States) Los Angeles Angels	Major League Baseball	(Australia) Brisbane, Queensland

=== Japan ===
Japan announced their squad on January 26, 2023. Seiya Suzuki withdrew due to oblique injury on February 28, then added Taisei Makihara as a replacement member of Suzuki.

Manager: 89 Hideki Kuriyama

Coaches: Bench 90 Kazuyuki Shirai, Hitting 77 Sadaaki Yoshimura, First base 87 Masaji Shimizu, Pitching 81 Masato Yoshii, Bullpen 75 Kazuyuki Atsuzawa, Infield 79 Noriyuki Shiroishi, Catching 74 Yoshinori Murata

Player	No.	Pos.	Date of birth (age)	Team	League	Birthplace
Yu Darvish	11	P	August 16, 1986 (aged 36)	(United States) San Diego Padres	Major League Baseball	(Japan) Habikino, Osaka
Shosei Togo	12	P	April 4, 2000 (aged 22)	(Japan) Yomiuri Giants	Nippon Professional Baseball	(Japan) Miyakonojō, Miyazaki
Yuki Matsui	13	P	October 30, 1995 (aged 27)	(Japan) Tohoku Rakuten Golden Eagles	Nippon Professional Baseball	(Japan) Aoba-ku, Yokohama, Kanagawa
Roki Sasaki	14	P	November 3, 2001 (aged 21)	(Japan) Chiba Lotte Marines	Nippon Professional Baseball	(Japan) Rikuzentakata, Iwate
Taisei Ota	15	P	June 29, 1999 (aged 23)	(Japan) Yomiuri Giants	Nippon Professional Baseball	(Japan) Taka, Hyōgo
Shohei Ohtani	16	P	July 5, 1994 (aged 28)	(United States) Los Angeles Angels	Major League Baseball	(Japan) Ōshū, Iwate
Hiromi Itoh	17	P	August 31, 1997 (aged 25)	(Japan) Hokkaido Nippon-Ham Fighters	Nippon Professional Baseball	(Japan) Shikabe, Hokkaido
Yoshinobu Yamamoto	18	P	August 17, 1998 (aged 24)	(Japan) Orix Buffaloes	Nippon Professional Baseball	(Japan) Bizen, Okayama
Ryoji Kuribayashi	20	P	July 9, 1996 (aged 26)	(Japan) Hiroshima Toyo Carp	Nippon Professional Baseball	(Japan) Aisai, Aichi
Shota Imanaga	21	P	September 1, 1993 (aged 29)	(Japan) Yokohama DeNA BayStars	Nippon Professional Baseball	(Japan) Kitakyushu, Fukuoka
Atsuki Yuasa	22	P	July 17, 1999 (aged 23)	(Japan) Hanshin Tigers	Nippon Professional Baseball	(Japan) Owase, Mie
Yuki Udagawa	26	P	November 10, 1998 (aged 24)	(Japan) Orix Buffaloes	Nippon Professional Baseball	(Japan) Koshigaya, Saitama
Hiroto Takahashi	28	P	August 9, 2002 (aged 20)	(Japan) Chunichi Dragons	Nippon Professional Baseball	(Japan) Owariasahi, Aichi
Hiroya Miyagi	29	P	August 25, 2001 (aged 21)	(Japan) Orix Buffaloes	Nippon Professional Baseball	(Japan) Ginowan, Okinawa
Keiji Takahashi	47	P	May 14, 1997 (aged 25)	(Japan) Tokyo Yakult Swallows	Nippon Professional Baseball	(Japan) Kameoka, Kyoto
Soichiro Yamazaki	63	P	June 15, 1998 (aged 24)	(Japan) Orix Buffaloes	Nippon Professional Baseball	(Japan) Kaga, Ishikawa
Takuya Kai	10	C	November 5, 1992 (aged 30)	(Japan) Fukuoka SoftBank Hawks	Nippon Professional Baseball	(Japan) Ōita, Ōita
Takumi Ohshiro	24	C	February 11, 1993 (aged 30)	(Japan) Yomiuri Giants	Nippon Professional Baseball	(Japan) Naha, Okinawa
Yuhei Nakamura	27	C	June 17, 1990 (aged 32)	(Japan) Tokyo Yakult Swallows	Nippon Professional Baseball	(Japan) Ōno, Fukui
Tetsuto Yamada	1	IF	July 16, 1992 (aged 30)	(Japan) Tokyo Yakult Swallows	Nippon Professional Baseball	(Japan) Toyooka, Hyōgo
Sosuke Genda	2	IF	February 16, 1993 (aged 30)	(Japan) Saitama Seibu Lions	Nippon Professional Baseball	(Japan) Ōita, Ōita
Shugo Maki	3	IF	April 21, 1998 (aged 24)	(Japan) Yokohama DeNA BayStars	Nippon Professional Baseball	(Japan) Nakano, Nagano
Taisei Makihara	5	IF	October 15, 1992 (aged 30)	(Japan) Fukuoka SoftBank Hawks	Nippon Professional Baseball	(Japan) Kurume, Fukuoka
Takumu Nakano	7	IF	June 28, 1996 (aged 26)	(Japan) Hanshin Tigers	Nippon Professional Baseball	(Japan) Tendō, Yamagata
Kazuma Okamoto	25	IF	June 30, 1996 (aged 26)	(Japan) Yomiuri Giants	Nippon Professional Baseball	(Japan) Gojō, Nara
Hotaka Yamakawa	33	IF	November 23, 1991 (aged 31)	(Japan) Saitama Seibu Lions	Nippon Professional Baseball	(Japan) Naha, Okinawa
Munetaka Murakami	55	IF	February 2, 2000 (aged 23)	(Japan) Tokyo Yakult Swallows	Nippon Professional Baseball	(Japan) Kumamoto, Kumamoto
Kensuke Kondoh	8	OF	August 9, 1993 (aged 29)	(Japan) Fukuoka SoftBank Hawks	Nippon Professional Baseball	(Japan) Midori-ku, Chiba, Chiba
Ukyo Shuto	9	OF	February 10, 1996 (aged 27)	(Japan) Fukuoka SoftBank Hawks	Nippon Professional Baseball	(Japan) Ōta, Gunma
Lars Nootbaar	23	OF	September 8, 1997 (aged 25)	(United States) St. Louis Cardinals	Major League Baseball	El Segundo, California, United States
Masataka Yoshida	34	OF	July 15, 1993 (aged 29)	(United States) Boston Red Sox	Major League Baseball	(Japan) Fukui, Fukui

=== South Korea ===
South Korea announced their squad on January 4, 2023.

Manager: 71 Lee Kang-chul

Coaches: Hitting 77 Kim Ki-tai, Third base 72 Kim Min-ho, First base 76 Kim Min-jae, Catching 70 Jin Kab-yong, Pitching 91 Jong Hyun-wook, Bullpen 81 Bae Young-soo, Quality control 88 Shim Jae-hak

Player	No.	Pos.	Date of birth (age)	Team	League	Birthplace
Go Woo-suk	19	P	August 6, 1998 (aged 24)	(South Korea) LG Twins	KBO League	(South Korea) Incheon
Gwak Been	61	P	May 28, 1999 (aged 23)	(South Korea) Doosan Bears	KBO League	(South Korea) Seoul
Jeong Cheol-won	65	P	March 27, 1999 (aged 23)	(South Korea) Doosan Bears	KBO League	(South Korea) Ansan
Jung Woo-young	18	P	August 19, 1999 (aged 23)	(South Korea) LG Twins	KBO League	(South Korea) Seoul
Kim Kwang-hyun	29	P	July 22, 1988 (aged 34)	(South Korea) SSG Landers	KBO League	(South Korea) Seoul
Kim Won-jung	34	P	June 14, 1993 (aged 29)	(South Korea) Lotte Giants	KBO League	(South Korea) Gwangju
Kim Yun-sik	57	P	April 3, 2000 (aged 22)	(South Korea) LG Twins	KBO League	(South Korea) Gwangju
Ko Young-pyo	1	P	September 16, 1991 (aged 31)	(South Korea) KT Wiz	KBO League	(South Korea) Naju
Koo Chang-mo	59	P	February 17, 1997 (aged 26)	(South Korea) NC Dinos	KBO League	(South Korea) Cheonan
Lee Eui-lee	48	P	June 16, 2002 (aged 20)	(South Korea) Kia Tigers	KBO League	(South Korea) Gwangju
Lee Yong-chan	45	P	January 2, 1989 (aged 34)	(South Korea) NC Dinos	KBO League	(South Korea) Seoul
Park Se-woong	21	P	November 30, 1995 (aged 27)	(South Korea) Lotte Giants	KBO League	(South Korea) Daegu
So Hyeong-jun	30	P	September 16, 2001 (aged 21)	(South Korea) KT Wiz	KBO League	(South Korea) Suwon
Won Tae-in	46	P	April 6, 2000 (aged 22)	(South Korea) Samsung Lions	KBO League	(South Korea) Daegu
Yang Hyeon-jong	54	P	March 1, 1988 (aged 35)	(South Korea) Kia Tigers	KBO League	(South Korea) Gwangju
Lee Ji-young	56	C	February 27, 1986 (aged 37)	(South Korea) Kiwoom Heroes	KBO League	(South Korea) Incheon
Yang Eui-ji	25	C	June 5, 1987 (aged 35)	(South Korea) Doosan Bears	KBO League	(South Korea) Gwangju
Choi Jeong	14	IF	February 28, 1987 (aged 36)	(South Korea) SSG Landers	KBO League	(South Korea) Icheon
Tommy Edman	11	IF	May 9, 1995 (aged 27)	(United States) St. Louis Cardinals	Major League Baseball	(United States) Pontiac, Michigan
Kang Baek-ho	50	IF	July 29, 1999 (aged 23)	(South Korea) KT Wiz	KBO League	(South Korea) Incheon
Kim Ha-seong	7	IF	October 17, 1995 (aged 27)	(United States) San Diego Padres	Major League Baseball	(South Korea) Bucheon
Kim Hye-seong	2	IF	January 27, 1999 (aged 24)	(South Korea) Kiwoom Heroes	KBO League	(South Korea) Goyang
Oh Ji-hwan	10	IF	July 2, 1990 (aged 32)	(South Korea) LG Twins	KBO League	(South Korea) Gunsan
Park Byung-ho	52	IF	July 10, 1986 (aged 36)	(South Korea) KT Wiz	KBO League	(South Korea) Seoul
Choi Ji-hoon	53	OF	July 23, 1997 (aged 25)	(South Korea) SSG Landers	KBO League	(South Korea) Gwangju
Kim Hyun-soo	22	OF	January 12, 1988 (aged 35)	(South Korea) LG Twins	KBO League	(South Korea) Seoul
Lee Jung-hoo	51	OF	August 20, 1998 (aged 24)	(South Korea) Kiwoom Heroes	KBO League	(Japan) Nagoya
Na Sung-bum	47	OF	October 3, 1989 (aged 33)	(South Korea) Kia Tigers	KBO League	(South Korea) Gwangju
Park Hae-min	17	OF	February 24, 1990 (aged 33)	(South Korea) LG Twins	KBO League	(South Korea) Seoul
Park Kun-woo	37	OF	September 8, 1990 (aged 32)	(South Korea) NC Dinos	KBO League	(South Korea) Seoul

=== China ===
China announced their squad on February 10, 2023.

Manager: (United States) 41 Dean Treanor

Coaches: Defensive 86 Chen Biao, Hitting and catching 56 Wang Wei, Infield 25 Chen Jiaji, Third base 16 Tarrik Brock, Baserunning 51 Zhu Xudong, Outfield 24 Chen Yanpeng, 3 Du Nan

Player	No.	Pos.	Date of birth (age)	Team	League	Birthplace
Alan Carter	38	P	December 16, 1997 (aged 25)	(United States) Los Angeles Angels (minors)	Major League Baseball	Singapore, Singapore
Hai-Cheng Gong	11	P	December 28, 1998 (aged 24)	(China) Shanghai Golden Eagles	China National Baseball League	(China) Bengbu, Anhui
Ju Kwon	68	P	May 31, 1995 (aged 27)	(South Korea) KT Wiz	KBO League	(China) Jilin Province
Lin Qiang	32	P		(China) Henan Elephants	China National Baseball League	(China)
Qi Xin	12	P	February 13, 1997 (aged 26)	(China) Beijing Tigers	China National Baseball League	(China) Beijing
Su Changlong	58	P	January 28, 1982 (aged 41)	(China) Tianjin Lions	China National Baseball League	(China) Tianjin
Sun Hailong	18	P		(China) Shanghai Golden Eagles	China National Baseball League	(China)
Wang Weiyi	13	P	July 7, 2002 (aged 20)	(China) Jiangsu Pegasus	China National Baseball League	(China) Shaanxi
Wang Xiang	42	P	November 28, 2003 (aged 19)	(China) Shanghai Golden Eagles	China National Baseball League	(China) Shanghai
Wang Yuchen	5	P		(China) Shanghai Golden Eagles	China National Baseball League	(China)
Yi Jian	15	P	February 9, 2001 (aged 22)	(China) Guangdong Leopards	China National Baseball League	(China) Langfang
Zhang Hao	59	P		(China) Sichuan Dragons	China National Baseball League	(China) Sichuan
Zhao Fuyang	17	P		(China) Jiangsu Pegasus	China National Baseball League	(China) Jiangsu
Zheng Chaoqun	23	P	February 9, 1993 (aged 30)	(China) Jiangsu Pegasus	China National Baseball League	(China) Jiangsu
Chen Chen	33	C		(China) Jiangsu Pegasus	China National Baseball League	(China)
Li Ning	9	C	November 12, 1994 (aged 28)	(China) Shanghai Golden Eagles	China National Baseball League	(China) Inner Mongolia
Li Yifan	69	C		(China) Beijing Tigers	China National Baseball League	(China)
Lu Yun	2	C	February 7, 1997 (aged 26)	(China) Beijing Tigers	China National Baseball League	(China)
Cao Jie	20	IF	February 17, 1998 (aged 25)	(China) Jiangsu Pegasus	China National Baseball League	(China) Jiangsu
Ray Chang	21	IF	August 24, 1983 (aged 39)			(United States) Kansas City, Missouri
Chen Chen	19	IF	March 18, 1995 (aged 27)	(China) Jiangsu Pegasus	China National Baseball League	(China) Jiangsu
Luan Chenchen	52	IF	January 16, 1996 (aged 27)	(China) Jiangsu Pegasus	China National Baseball League	(China) Jiangsu
Kou Yongkang	8	IF	January 29, 2001 (aged 22)	(China) Shanghai Eagles	China National Baseball League	(China) Suzhou
Yang Jin	7	IF	November 18, 1998 (aged 24)	(China) Shanghai Eagles	China National Baseball League	(China) Shanghai
Xudong Zhu	51	IF	December 5, 2002 (aged 20)			(China) Guangdong
Han Xiao	22	OF	April 11, 1996 (aged 26)	(China) Shanghai Eagles	China National Baseball League	(China)
Liang Pei	6	OF	April 14, 1998 (aged 24)	(China) Beijing Tigers	China National Baseball League	(China)
Liang Rongji	27	OF		MLB Development Center China		(China)
Luo Jinjun	29	OF	January 8, 1995 (aged 28)	(China) Guangdong Leopards	China National Baseball League	(China) Guangdong
Lyu Yuheng	1	OF	November 11, 1995 (aged 27)	(China) Beijing Tigers	China National Baseball League	(China)
Yusuke Masago	10	OF	May 4, 1994 (aged 28)	(Japan) Hitachi	Japanese Industrial League	(Japan) Kyoto City, Kyoto

=== Czech Republic ===
Czech Republic announced their squad on September 13, 2022.

Manager: 13 Pavel Chadim

Coaches: Quality control Joe Truesdale, Pitching 22 John Hussey, Hitting Alex Derhak, Third base 17 David Winkler, First base Michael Griffin, Bullpen 25 Dusan Randak, Catching David Neveril

Player	No.	Pos.	Date of birth (age)	Team	League	Birthplace
Jeff Barto	18	P	September 15, 1989 (aged 33)	(Czech Republic) Třebíč Nuclears	Extraliga	(United States) Boise, Idaho
Filip Čapka	14	P	November 4, 1998 (aged 24)	(Czech Republic) Draci Brno	Extraliga	(Czech Republic) Brno
Tomáš Duffek	7	P	September 12, 1989 (aged 33)	(Czech Republic) Eagles Praha	Extraliga	(Czech Republic) Prague
Lukáš Ercoli	63	P	April 17, 1996 (aged 26)	(Czech Republic) Hroši Brno	Extraliga	(Czech Republic) Roudnice
Lukáš Hlouch	60	P	December 12, 2000 (aged 22)	(Czech Republic) Hroši Brno	Extraliga	(Czech Republic) Třebíč
Michal Kovala	1	P	December 28, 2003 (aged 19)	(Czech Republic) Arrows Ostrava	Extraliga	(Czech Republic) Ostrava
David Mergans	43	P	February 27, 2002 (aged 21)	(Italy) Milano Baseball	Serie B	(Czech Republic) Brno
Marek Minařík	15	P	June 28, 1993 (aged 29)	(Czech Republic) Tempo Praha	Extraliga	(Czech Republic) Louny
Jan Novák	34	P	January 19, 1994 (aged 29)	(Czech Republic) Sokol Hluboká	Extraliga	(Czech Republic) Prague
Daniel Padyšák	23	P	July 2, 2000 (aged 22)	(United States) Charleston Southern Buccaneers	Big South Conference	(Czech Republic) Prague
Ondřej Satoria	35	P	February 26, 1997 (aged 26)	(Czech Republic) Arrows Ostrava	Extraliga	(Czech Republic) Ostrava
Martin Schneider	13	P	March 4, 1986 (aged 37)	(Czech Republic) Draci Brno	Extraliga	(Czech Republic) Olomouc
Jan Tomek	8	P	January 29, 1992 (aged 31)	(Germany) Regensburg Legionäre	Bundesliga	(Czech Republic) Frýdek-Místek
Boris Večerka		P	August 11, 2003 (aged 19)	(United States) Arizona Diamondbacks (minors)	Major League Baseball	(Czech Republic) Brno
Marek Krejčiřík	97	P	June 27, 2001 (aged 21)	(Czech Republic) Hroši Brno	Extraliga	(Czech Republic) Brno
Jake Rabinowitz	42	P	October 29, 1987 (aged 35)	(Czech Republic) Tempo Praha	Extraliga	New York, New York, United States
Martin Červenka	55	C	August 3, 1992 (aged 30)	(Czech Republic) Eagles Praha	Extraliga	(Czech Republic) Prague
Daniel Vavruša	32	C	July 9, 1991 (aged 31)	(Germany) Heidenheim Heideköpfe	Bundesliga	(Czech Republic) Prague
Willie Escala	5	IF	December 11, 1998 (aged 24)	(United States) Sussex County Miners	Frontier League	Miami, Florida, United States
Jakub Hajtmar	2	IF	June 14, 1987 (aged 35)	(Czech Republic) Draci Brno	Extraliga	(Czech Republic) Brno
Jakub Kubica	40	IF	March 13, 1998 (aged 24)	(Czech Republic) Arrows Ostrava	Extraliga	(Czech Republic) Ostrava
Vojtěch Menšík	77	IF	May 24, 1998 (aged 24)	(Czech Republic) Hroši Brno	Extraliga	(Czech Republic) Brno
Milan Prokop	31	IF	February 12, 2003 (aged 20)	(Czech Republic) Draci Brno	Extraliga	(Czech Republic) Brno
Filip Smola	16	IF	October 4, 1997 (aged 25)	(Czech Republic) Tempo Praha	Extraliga	(Czech Republic) Prague
Eric Sogard	9	IF	May 22, 1986 (aged 36)			Phoenix, Arizona, United States
Petr Zýma	99	IF	July 28, 1989 (aged 33)	(Czech Republic) Eagles Praha	Extraliga	(Czech Republic) Prague
Marek Chlup	73	OF	January 9, 1999 (aged 24)	(Czech Republic) Eagles Praha	Extraliga	(Czech Republic) Turnov
Arnošt Dubový	20	OF	April 1, 1992 (aged 30)	(Czech Republic) Draci Brno	Extraliga	(Czech Republic) Brno
Jakub Grepl	30	OF	October 14, 1999 (aged 23)	(Czech Republic) Arrows Ostrava	Extraliga	(Czech Republic) Ostrava
Matěj Menšík	33	OF	May 11, 1992 (aged 30)	(Czech Republic) Technika Brno	Extraliga	(Czech Republic) Brno
Martin Mužík	49	OF	April 23, 1996 (aged 26)	(Czech Republic) Sokol Hluboká	Extraliga	(Czech Republic) České Budějovice

== Pool C ==
=== United States ===
United States announced their squad on January 18, 2023.

Manager: 4 Mark DeRosa

Coaches: Bench 11 Jerry Manuel, 34 Brian McCann, Pitching 13 Andy Pettitte, Hitting 24 Ken Griffey Jr., First Base 6 Lou Collier, Third Base 14 Dino Ebel, Bullpen 19 Dave Righetti

Player	No.	Pos.	Date of birth (age)	Team	League	Birthplace
Jason Adam	47	P	August 4, 1991 (aged 31)	(United States) Tampa Bay Rays	Major League Baseball	(United States) Omaha, Nebraska
Daniel Bard	52	P	June 25, 1985 (aged 37)	(United States) Colorado Rockies	Major League Baseball	(United States) Houston, Texas
David Bednar	53	P	October 10, 1994 (aged 28)	(United States) Pittsburgh Pirates	Major League Baseball	(United States) Pittsburgh, Pennsylvania
Kyle Freeland	21	P	May 14, 1993 (aged 29)	(United States) Colorado Rockies	Major League Baseball	(United States) Denver, Colorado
Kendall Graveman	49	P	December 21, 1990 (aged 32)	(United States) Chicago White Sox	Major League Baseball	(United States) Alexander City, Alabama
Merrill Kelly	29	P	October 14, 1988 (aged 34)	(United States) Arizona Diamondbacks	Major League Baseball	(United States) Houston, Texas
Aaron Loup	26	P	December 19, 1987 (aged 35)	(United States) Los Angeles Angels	Major League Baseball	(United States) Raceland, Louisiana
Lance Lynn	33	P	May 12, 1987 (aged 35)	(United States) Chicago White Sox	Major League Baseball	(United States) Indianapolis, Indiana
Nick Martinez	22	P	August 5, 1990 (aged 32)	(United States) San Diego Padres	Major League Baseball	(United States) Miami, Florida
Miles Mikolas	39	P	August 23, 1988 (aged 34)	(United States) St. Louis Cardinals	Major League Baseball	(United States) Jupiter, Florida
Adam Ottavino	0	P	November 22, 1985 (aged 37)	(United States) New York Mets	Major League Baseball	(United States) New York City, New York
Ryan Pressly	55	P	December 15, 1988 (aged 34)	(United States) Houston Astros	Major League Baseball	(United States) Dallas, Texas
Brady Singer	51	P	August 4, 1996 (aged 26)	(United States) Kansas City Royals	Major League Baseball	(United States) Leesburg, Florida
Adam Wainwright	50	P	August 30, 1981 (aged 41)	(United States) St. Louis Cardinals	Major League Baseball	(United States) Brunswick, Georgia
Devin Williams	38	P	September 21, 1994 (aged 28)	(United States) Milwaukee Brewers	Major League Baseball	(United States) St. Louis, Missouri
Kyle Higashioka	66	C	April 20, 1990 (aged 32)	(United States) New York Yankees	Major League Baseball	(United States) Huntington Beach, California
J. T. Realmuto	10	C	March 18, 1991 (aged 31)	(United States) Philadelphia Phillies	Major League Baseball	(United States) Del City, Oklahoma
Will Smith	16	C	March 28, 1995 (aged 27)	(United States) Los Angeles Dodgers	Major League Baseball	(United States) Louisville, Kentucky
Pete Alonso	20	IF	December 7, 1994 (aged 28)	(United States) New York Mets	Major League Baseball	(United States) Tampa, Florida
Tim Anderson	7	IF	June 23, 1993 (aged 29)	(United States) Chicago White Sox	Major League Baseball	(United States) Tuscaloosa, Alabama
Nolan Arenado	28	IF	April 16, 1991 (aged 31)	(United States) St. Louis Cardinals	Major League Baseball	(United States) Newport Beach, California
Paul Goldschmidt	46	IF	September 10, 1987 (aged 35)	(United States) St. Louis Cardinals	Major League Baseball	(United States) Wilmington, Delaware
Trea Turner	8	IF	June 30, 1993 (aged 29)	(United States) Philadelphia Phillies	Major League Baseball	(United States) Boynton Beach, Florida
Bobby Witt Jr.	15	IF	June 14, 2000 (aged 22)	(United States) Kansas City Royals	Major League Baseball	(United States) Colleyville, Texas
Mookie Betts	3	OF	October 7, 1992 (aged 30)	(United States) Los Angeles Dodgers	Major League Baseball	(United States) Nashville, Tennessee
Jeff McNeil	1	OF	August 23, 1988 (aged 34)	(United States) New York Mets	Major League Baseball	(United States) Santa Barbara, California
Cedric Mullins	31	OF	October 1, 1994 (aged 28)	(United States) Baltimore Orioles	Major League Baseball	(United States) Greensboro, North Carolina
Kyle Schwarber	12	OF	March 5, 1993 (aged 30)	(United States) Philadelphia Phillies	Major League Baseball	(United States) Middletown, Ohio
Mike Trout	27	OF	August 7, 1991 (aged 31)	(United States) Los Angeles Angels	Major League Baseball	(United States) Vineland, New Jersey
Kyle Tucker	30	OF	January 17, 1997 (aged 26)	(United States) Houston Astros	Major League Baseball	(United States) Tampa, Florida

=== Mexico ===
Mexico announced their squad on February 9, 2023.

Manager: 30 Benji Gil

Coaches: Bench 9 Vinny Castilla, Hitting 18 Jacob Cruz, 70 Bobby Magallanes, Pitching 26 Horacio Ramírez, First base 12 Gil Velazquez, Third base 21 Tony Perezchica, Bullpen 45 Elmer Dessens

Player	No.	Pos.	Date of birth (age)	Team	League	Birthplace
Jaime Arias	8	P	January 21, 1999 (aged 24)	(United States) Cleveland Guardians (minors)	Major League Baseball	(United States) Woodland, California
Erubiel Armenta	23	P	March 11, 2000 (aged 22)	(United States) Philadelphia Phillies (minors)	Major League Baseball	(Mexico) Tijuana
Javier Assad	77	P	July 30, 1997 (aged 25)	(United States) Chicago Cubs	Major League Baseball	(Mexico) Tijuana
Manny Barreda	50	P	October 8, 1988 (aged 34)	(Mexico) Toros de Tijuana	Mexican League	(United States) Prescott, Arizona
Victor Castaneda	82	P	August 27, 1998 (aged 24)	(United States) Milwaukee Brewers (minors)	Major League Baseball	(Mexico) Culiacán
Luis Cessa	85	P	April 25, 1992 (aged 30)	(United States) Cincinnati Reds	Major League Baseball	(Mexico) Córdoba
Jesús Cruz	49	P	April 15, 1995 (aged 27)	(United States) Philadelphia Phillies (minors)	Major League Baseball	(Mexico) Salinas de Hidalgo
Giovanny Gallegos	65	P	August 14, 1991 (aged 31)	(United States) St. Louis Cardinals	Major League Baseball	(Mexico) Ciudad Obregón
Felipe González	1	P	August 15, 1991 (aged 31)	(Mexico) Sultanes de Monterrey	Mexican League	(Mexico) Guadalupe, Nuevo León
Adrián Martínez	55	P	December 10, 1996 (aged 26)	(United States) Oakland Athletics	Major League Baseball	(Mexico) Mexicali
Óliver Pérez	29	P	August 15, 1981 (aged 41)	(Mexico) Toros de Tijuana	Mexican League	(Mexico) Culiacán
Roel Ramírez	53	P	May 26, 1995 (aged 27)	(United States) Atlanta Braves (minors)	Major League Baseball	(United States) Laredo, Texas
Alan Rangel	84	P	August 21, 1997 (aged 25)	(United States) Atlanta Braves (minors)	Major League Baseball	(Mexico) Hermosillo
Gerardo Reyes	33	P	May 13, 1993 (aged 29)	(United States) Los Angeles Angels (minors)	Major League Baseball	(Mexico) Ciudad Victoria
Wilmer Rios	20	P	March 3, 1994 (aged 29)	(Mexico) Acereros de Monclova	Mexican League	(Mexico) Guasave
JoJo Romero	59	P	September 9, 1996 (aged 26)	(United States) St. Louis Cardinals	Major League Baseball	(United States) Camarillo, California
Jake Sanchez	14	P	August 19, 1989 (aged 33)	(United States) San Diego Padres (minors)	Major League Baseball	(United States) Brawley, California
Patrick Sandoval	43	P	October 18, 1996 (aged 26)	(United States) Los Angeles Angels	Major League Baseball	(United States) Mission Viejo, California
Julio Urías	7	P	August 12, 1996 (aged 26)	(United States) Los Angeles Dodgers	Major League Baseball	(Mexico) Culiacán
José Urquidy	59	P	May 1, 1995 (aged 27)	(United States) Houston Astros	Major League Baseball	(Mexico) Mazatlán
César Vargas	46	P	December 30, 1991 (aged 31)	(Mexico) Sultanes de Monterrey	Mexican League	(Mexico) Puebla City
Taijuan Walker	99	P	August 13, 1992 (aged 30)	(United States) Philadelphia Phillies	Major League Baseball	(United States) Shreveport, Louisiana
Samuel Zazueta	16	P	November 21, 1996 (aged 26)	(Mexico) Toros de Tijuana	Mexican League	(Mexico) Ciudad Obregón
Austin Barnes	15	C	December 28, 1989 (aged 33)	(United States) Los Angeles Dodgers	Major League Baseball	(United States) Fullerton, California
Alexis Wilson	51	C	August 13, 1996 (aged 26)	(Mexico) Tigres de Quintana Roo	Mexican League	(Mexico) Los Mochis
Jonathan Aranda	62	IF	May 23, 1998 (aged 24)	(United States) Tampa Bay Rays	Major League Baseball	(Mexico) Tijuana
Joey Meneses	32	IF	May 6, 1992 (aged 30)	(United States) Washington Nationals	Major League Baseball	(Mexico) Culiacán
Isaac Paredes	17	IF	February 18, 1999 (aged 24)	(United States) Tampa Bay Rays	Major League Baseball	(Mexico) Hermosillo
Rowdy Tellez	11	IF	March 16, 1995 (aged 27)	(United States) Milwaukee Brewers	Major League Baseball	(United States) Sacramento, California
Alan Trejo	13	IF	May 30, 1996 (aged 26)	(United States) Colorado Rockies	Major League Baseball	(United States) Downey, California
Luis Urías	3	IF	June 3, 1997 (aged 25)	(United States) Milwaukee Brewers	Major League Baseball	(Mexico) Magdalena de Kino
Roberto Valenzuela	38	IF	March 3, 1995 (aged 28)	(Mexico) Sultanes de Monterrey	Mexican League	(Mexico) Ciudad Obregón
Randy Arozarena	56	OF	February 28, 1995 (aged 28)	(United States) Tampa Bay Rays	Major League Baseball	Havana, Cuba
José Cardona	24	OF	March 16, 1994 (aged 28)	(Mexico) Sultanes de Monterrey	Mexican League	(Mexico) San Nicolás de los Garza
Jarren Duran	2	OF	September 5, 1996 (aged 26)	(United States) Boston Red Sox	Major League Baseball	(United States) Corona, California
Alek Thomas	5	OF	April 28, 2000 (aged 22)	(United States) Arizona Diamondbacks	Major League Baseball	(United States) Chicago, Illinois
Alex Verdugo	27	OF	May 15, 1996 (aged 26)	(United States) Boston Red Sox	Major League Baseball	(United States) Tucson, Arizona

=== Colombia ===
Colombia announced their squad on February 9, 2023.

Manager: 8 Jolbert Cabrera

Coaches: Bench 15 Jose Mosquera, Hitting 23 Jorge Cortés, Pitching 44 Walter Miranda, First base 10 Ronald Ramirez, Third base 5 Jair Fernandez, Assistant 18 Orlando Cabrera, Assistant 16 Édgar Rentería

Player	No.	Pos.	Date of birth (age)	Team	League	Birthplace
Adrian Almeida	22	P	February 25, 1995 (aged 28)	(Mexico) Piratas de Campeche	Mexican League	(Venezuela) Puerto Cabello
Danis Correa	41	P	August 26, 1999 (aged 23)	(United States) Chicago Cubs (minors)	Major League Baseball	(Colombia) Cartagena
Nabil Crismatt	74	P	December 25, 1994 (aged 28)	(United States) San Diego Padres	Major League Baseball	(Colombia) Barranquilla
William Cuevas	32	P	October 14, 1990 (aged 32)	(Mexico) Diablos Rojos del México	Mexican League	(Venezuela) Caracas
Luis De Avila	34	P	May 29, 2001 (aged 21)	(United States) Atlanta Braves (minors)	Major League Baseball	(Colombia) San Estanislao
Santiago Florez	50	P	May 9, 2000 (aged 22)	(United States) Pittsburgh Pirates (minors)	Major League Baseball	(Colombia) Barranquilla
Ruben Galindo	53	P	January 24, 2001 (aged 22)	(United States) San Diego Padres (minors)	Major League Baseball	(Colombia) San Juan de Urabá
Pedro García	72	P	March 21, 1995 (aged 27)	(United States) Cincinnati Reds (minors)	Major League Baseball	(Venezuela) Maracaibo
Rio Gomez	29	P	October 20, 1994 (aged 28)	(United States) Boston Red Sox (minors)	Major League Baseball	(United States) Miami
Yapson Gomez	30	P	October 2, 1993 (aged 29)	(Mexico) El Águila de Veracruz	Mexican League	(Venezuela) San Cristóbal
Tayron Guerrero	56	P	January 9, 1991 (aged 32)	(United States) Cincinnati Reds (minors)	Major League Baseball	(Colombia) Tierra Bomba Island
Jasier Herrera	98	P	January 1, 1998 (aged 25)	(Venezuela) Tiburones de La Guaira	Venezuelan Professional Baseball League	(Colombia) Cartagena
Jeffry Niño	19	P	September 26, 1996 (aged 26)	(Mexico) Diablos Rojos del México	Mexican League	(Colombia) Barranquilla
Carlos Ocampo	41	P	September 3, 1998 (aged 24)	(United States) New York Mets (minors)	Major League Baseball	(Colombia) Cartagena
Jhon Romero	26	P	January 17, 1995 (aged 28)			(Colombia) Cartagena
Reiver Sanmartín	52	P	April 15, 1996 (aged 26)	(United States) Cincinnati Reds	Major League Baseball	(Colombia) Cartagena
Julio Teherán	47	P	January 27, 1991 (aged 32)	(United States) San Diego Padres	Major League Baseball	(Colombia) Cartagena
Julio Vivas	90	P	October 1, 1993 (aged 29)	(Colombia) Vaqueros de Montería	Colombian Professional Baseball League	(Venezuela) Táchira
Ezequiel Zabaleta	48	P	August 20, 1995 (aged 27)	(United States) Gastonia Honey Hunters	Atlantic League	(Colombia) Bolívar
Guillermo Zuñiga	66	P	October 10, 1998 (aged 24)	(United States) St. Louis Cardinals (minors)	Major League Baseball	(Colombia) Cartagena
Jorge Alfaro	38	C	June 11, 1993 (aged 29)	(United States) Boston Red Sox (minors)	Major League Baseball	(Colombia) Sincelejo
Gustavo Campero	12	C	September 20, 1997 (aged 25)	(United States) Los Angeles Angels (minors)	Major League Baseball	(Colombia) Santa Cruz de Lorica
Elías Díaz	35	C	November 17, 1990 (aged 32)	(United States) Colorado Rockies	Major League Baseball	(Venezuela) Maracaibo
Jhonatan Solano	21	C	August 12, 1985 (aged 37)			(Colombia) Barranquilla
Meibrys Viloria	20	C	February 15, 1997 (aged 26)	(United States) Cleveland Guardians (minors)	Major League Baseball	(Colombia) Cartagena
Jordan Díaz	13	IF	August 13, 2000 (aged 22)	(United States) Oakland Athletics	Major League Baseball	(Colombia) Montería
Dayan Frías	77	IF	June 25, 2002 (aged 20)	(United States) Cleveland Guardians (minors)	Major League Baseball	(Colombia) Cartagena
Dilson Herrera	3	IF	March 3, 1994 (aged 29)	(United States) Staten Island FerryHawks	Atlantic League of Professional Baseball	(Colombia) Cartagena
Evan Mendoza	27	IF	June 28, 1996 (aged 26)	(United States) San Diego Padres (minors)	Major League Baseball	Sarasota, Florida, United States
Fabián Pertuz	11	IF	September 1, 2000 (aged 22)	(United States) Chicago Cubs (minors)	Major League Baseball	(Colombia) Barranquilla
Reynaldo Rodríguez	16	IF	July 2, 1986 (aged 36)	(Mexico) Tigres de Quintana Roo	Mexican League	(Colombia) Cartagena
Adrián Sánchez	9	IF	September 6, 1994 (aged 28)			(Venezuela) Maracaibo
Gio Urshela	39	IF	October 11, 1991 (aged 31)	(United States) Los Angeles Angels	Major League Baseball	(Colombia) Cartagena
Jesús Marriaga	6	OF	December 17, 1998 (aged 24)	(United States) Gary SouthShore RailCats	American Association of Professional Baseball	(Colombia) Cartagena
Óscar Mercado	36	OF	December 16, 1994 (aged 28)	(United States) St. Louis Cardinals (minors)	Major League Baseball	(Colombia) Cartagena
Harold Ramírez	43	OF	September 6, 1994 (aged 28)	(United States) Tampa Bay Rays	Major League Baseball	(Colombia) Cartagena

=== Canada ===
Canada announced their squad on 2023.

Manager: (United States) 12 Ernie Whitt

Coaches: Pitching 35 Denis Boucher, Coach 8 Greg Hamilton, Third base 34 Tim Leiper, Bullpen 45 Paul Quantrill, First base 33 Larry Walker, Bullpen 22 Jordan Procyshen

Player	No.	Pos.	Date of birth (age)	Team	League	Birthplace
Andrew Albers	63	P	October 6, 1985 (aged 37)			(Canada) North Battleford, Saskatchewan
Phillippe Aumont	37	P	January 7, 1989 (aged 34)			(Canada) Gatineau, Quebec
John Axford	59	P	April 1, 1983 (aged 39)			(Canada) Simcoe, Ontario
Matt Brash	6	P	May 12, 1998 (aged 24)	(United States) Seattle Mariners	Major League Baseball	(Canada) Kingston, Ontario
Mitch Bratt	28	P	July 3, 2003 (aged 19)	(United States) Texas Rangers (minors)	Major League Baseball	(Canada) Newmarket, Ontario
Trevor Brigden	39	P	September 20, 1995 (aged 27)	(United States) Tampa Bay Rays (minors)	Major League Baseball	(Canada) North York, Ontario
Indigo Diaz	52	P	October 14, 1998 (aged 24)	(United States) New York Yankees (minors)	Major League Baseball	(Canada) North Vancouver, British Columbia
R.J. Freure	24	P	July 6, 1997 (aged 25)	(United States) Lincoln Saltdogs	American Association	(Canada) Burlington, Ontario
Adam Loewen	20	P	April 9, 1984 (aged 38)			(Canada) Surrey, British Columbia
Scott Mathieson	48	P	February 27, 1984 (aged 39)			(Canada) Vancouver, British Columbia
Ben Onyshko	38	P	October 18, 1996 (aged 26)	(United States) Seattle Mariners (minors)	Major League Baseball	(Canada) Winnipeg, Manitoba
Cal Quantrill	47	P	February 10, 1995 (aged 28)	(United States) Cleveland Guardians	Major League Baseball	(Canada) Port Hope, Ontario
Evan Rutckyj	32	P	January 31, 1992 (aged 31)	(Japan) Niigata Albirex	Baseball Challenge League	(Canada) Windsor, Ontario
Noah Skirrow	25	P	July 21, 1998 (aged 24)	(United States) Philadelphia Phillies (minors)	Major League Baseball	(Canada) Cambridge, Ontario
Cade Smith	30	P	May 9, 1999 (aged 23)	(United States) Cleveland Guardians (minors)	Major League Baseball	(Canada) Abbotsford, British Columbia
Curtis Taylor	56	P	July 25, 1995 (aged 27)	(United States) Chicago Cubs (minors)	Major League Baseball	(Canada) Port Coquitlam, British Columbia
Rob Zastryzny	40	P	March 26, 1992 (aged 30)	(United States) Pittsburgh Pirates (minors)	Major League Baseball	(Canada) Edmonton, Alberta
Kellin Deglan	14	C	May 13, 1992 (aged 30)			(Canada) Langley, British Columbia
Bo Naylor	44	C	February 21, 2000 (aged 23)	(United States) Cleveland Guardians	Major League Baseball	(Canada) Mississauga, Ontario
Freddie Freeman	5	IF	September 12, 1989 (aged 33)	(United States) Los Angeles Dodgers	Major League Baseball	(United States) Fountain Valley, California
Edouard Julien	15	IF	April 30, 1999 (aged 23)	(United States) Minnesota Twins (minors)	Major League Baseball	(Canada) Ancienne-Lorette, Quebec
Otto Lopez	51	IF	October 1, 1998 (aged 24)	(Canada) Toronto Blue Jays	Major League Baseball	Santo Domingo, Dominican Republic
Damiano Palmegiani	18	IF	January 24, 2000 (aged 23)	(Canada) Toronto Blue Jays (minors)	Major League Baseball	Caracas, Venezuela
Abraham Toro	13	IF	December 20, 1996 (aged 26)	(United States) Milwaukee Brewers	Major League Baseball	(Canada) Longueuil, Quebec
Jared Young	74	IF	July 9, 1995 (aged 27)	(United States) Chicago Cubs (minors)	Major League Baseball	(Canada) Prince George, British Columbia
Dasan Brown	7	OF	September 25, 2001 (aged 21)	(Canada) Toronto Blue Jays (minors)	Major League Baseball	(Canada) Oakville, Ontario
Owen Caissie	21	OF	July 8, 2002 (aged 20)	(United States) Chicago Cubs (minors)	Major League Baseball	(Canada) Burlington, Ontario
Denzel Clarke	23	OF	May 1, 2000 (aged 22)	(United States) Oakland Athletics (minors)	Major League Baseball	(Canada) Toronto, Ontario
Tyler O'Neill	27	OF	June 22, 1995 (aged 27)	(United States) St. Louis Cardinals	Major League Baseball	(Canada) Burnaby, British Columbia
Jacob Robson	8	OF	November 20, 1994 (aged 28)	(United States) Kansas City Monarchs	American Association	(Canada) London, Ontario

=== Great Britain ===
Great Britain announced their squad on 2023.

Manager: (United States) 13 Drew Spencer

Coaches: First base 34 Albert Cartwright, Pitching 36 Zach Graefser, Third base 21 TS Reed, Bench 7 Brad Marcelino, 0 Antoan Richardson, Bullpen 51 Conor Brooks, Associate hitting 3 Jonathon Cramman

Player	No.	Pos.	Date of birth (age)	Team	League	Birthplace
Donovan Benoit	18	P	January 22, 1999 (aged 24)	(United States) Cincinnati Reds (minors)	Major League Baseball	Key West, Florida, United States
Malik Binns		P	January 15, 1999 (aged 24)	(United States) Philadelphia Phillies (minors)	Major League Baseball	Chicago, Illinois, United States
Richard Brereton		P	June 27, 1998 (aged 24)			(United Kingdom) London
Daniel Cooper	33	P	November 6, 1986 (aged 36)			Newport Beach, California, United States
Jake Esch	67	P	March 27, 1990 (aged 32)			Saint Paul, Minnesota, United States
Chavez Fernander	34	P	July 7, 1997 (aged 25)	(United States) Detroit Tigers (minors)	Major League Baseball	(The Bahamas) Freeport, Bahamas
Ian Gibaut	79	P	November 19, 1993 (aged 29)	(United States) Cincinnati Reds	Major League Baseball	Houston, Texas, United States
Gunnar Groen		P	July 1, 1997 (aged 25)	(United States) Arizona Diamondbacks (minors)	Arizona Complex League	(United Kingdom) London
Joseph King	44	P	February 23, 2001 (aged 22)	(United States) St. Louis Cardinals (minors)	Major League Baseball	Redwood City, California, United States
Ryan Long	35	P	October 19, 1999 (aged 23)	(United States) Baltimore Orioles (minors)	Major League Baseball	Woodinville, Washington, United States
McKenzie Mills	50	P	November 19, 1995 (aged 27)	(Mexico) Tigres de Quintana Roo	Mexican League	Marietta, Georgia, United States
Akeel Morris	23	P	November 14, 1992 (aged 30)	(United States) Long Island Ducks	Atlantic League	(United States Virgin Islands) Saint Thomas, U.S. Virgin Islands
Branden Noriega		P	July 9, 2001 (aged 21)	(United States) Chicago Cubs (minors)	Major League Baseball	Miami, Florida, United States
Cam Opp	19	P	November 4, 1995 (aged 27)	(United States) New York Mets (minors)	Major League Baseball	Denver, Colorado, United States
Michael Petersen	25	P	May 16, 1994 (aged 28)	(United States) Colorado Rockies (minors)	Major League Baseball	(United Kingdom) London
Michael Roth	29	P	February 15, 1990 (aged 33)			Greenville, South Carolina, United States
Andre Scrubb	70	P	January 13, 1995 (aged 28)			Fort Bragg, North Carolina, United States
Jack Seppings		P	July 3, 2002 (aged 20)	(United States) Brown Bears	Ivy League	Newnan, Georgia, United States
Matteo Sollecito	27	P	December 26, 2000 (aged 22)	(United States) Swarthmore Garnet	Centennial Conference	(United Kingdom) London
Graham Spraker	30	P	March 19, 1995 (aged 27)			Tucson, Arizona, United States
Tahnaj Thomas	17	P	June 16, 1999 (aged 23)	(United States) Pittsburgh Pirates (minors)	Major League Baseball	(The Bahamas) Freeport, Bahamas
Tyler Viza	21	P	October 21, 1994 (aged 28)			Phoenix, Arizona, United States
Alex Webb	32	P	July 19, 1994 (aged 28)			Surrey, British Columbia, Canada
Vance Worley	49	P	September 25, 1987 (aged 35)	(United States) Kane County Cougars	American Association	Sacramento, California, United States
Ural Forbes	20	C	April 13, 1998 (aged 24)	Free agent		(The Bahamas) Freeport, Bahamas
Harry Ford	1	C	February 21, 2003 (aged 20)	(United States) Seattle Mariners (minors)	Major League Baseball	Atlanta, Georgia, United States
B. J. Murray	4	IF	January 5, 2000 (aged 23)	(United States) Chicago Cubs (minors)	Major League Baseball	(The Bahamas) Nassau, Bahamas
Nick Ward	5	IF	October 19, 1995 (aged 27)	(United States) Washington Wild Things	Frontier League	Kennett Square, Pennsylvania, United States
Justin Wylie	2	IF	August 26, 1996 (aged 26)	(United States) New Jersey Jackals	Frontier League	Lancaster, Pennsylvania, United States
Alex Crosby	15	OF	July 30, 1993 (aged 29)	(United States) Southern Maryland Blue Crabs	Atlantic League	Vacaville, California, United States
Chavez Young	12	OF	July 8, 1997 (aged 25)	(United States) Pittsburgh Pirates (minors)	Major League Baseball	(The Bahamas) Freeport, Bahamas
D'Shawn Knowles	8	OF	January 16, 2001 (aged 22)	(United States) Los Angeles Angels (minors)	Major League Baseball	(The Bahamas) New Providence, Bahamas
Matt Koperniak	18	OF	February 8, 1998 (aged 25)	(United States) St. Louis Cardinals (minors)	Major League Baseball	(United Kingdom) London
Jaden Rudd	3	OF	August 16, 2002 (aged 20)	(Canada) Toronto Blue Jays (minors)	Major League Baseball	(United Kingdom) RAF Lakenheath, Suffolk
Anfernee Seymour	9	OF	June 24, 1995 (aged 27)	(United States) Long Island Ducks	Atlantic League	(The Bahamas) Nassau, Bahamas
Darnell Sweeney	24	OF	February 1, 1991 (aged 32)			Hollywood, Florida, United States
Trayce Thompson	43	OF	March 15, 1991 (aged 31)	(United States) Los Angeles Dodgers	Major League Baseball	Portland, Oregon, United States

== Pool D ==
=== Israel ===
Israel announced their squad on 2023.

Manager: 3 Ian Kinsler

Coaches: Hitting 20 Kevin Youkilis, Bench 12 Brad Ausmus, 48 Jerry Narron, Pitching 28 Josh Zeid, First base 5 Tyger Pederson, Third base 2 Blake Gailen, Bullpen 16 Nate Fish

Pos.	No.	Player	Date of birth (age)	Bats	Throws	Club
P	35	Richard Bleier	April 16, 1987 (aged 35)	L	L	Boston Red Sox
P	99	Daniel Federman	September 18, 1998 (aged 24)	L	R	Baltimore Orioles (minors)
P	31	Jake Fishman	February 8, 1995 (aged 28)	L	L	Oakland Athletics (minors)
P	10	Brandon Gold	September 16, 1994 (aged 28)	R	R	
P	26	Colton Gordon	December 20, 1998 (aged 24)	L	L	Houston Astros (minors)
P	66	Andrew Gross	September 19, 1996 (aged 26)	R	R	Tampa Bay Rays (minors)
P	37	Jake Kalish	July 9, 1991 (aged 31)	S	L	Los Angeles Angels
P	22	Rob Kaminsky	September 2, 1994 (aged 28)	R	L	Colorado Rockies
P	47	Alex Katz	October 12, 1994 (aged 28)	L	L	Staten Island FerryHawks
P	56	Adam Kolarek	January 14, 1989 (aged 34)	L	L	Oakland Athletics (minors)
P	32	Evan Kravetz	December 19, 1996 (aged 26)	L	L	Cincinnati Reds (minors)
P	17	Dean Kremer	January 7, 1996 (aged 27)	R	R	Baltimore Orioles
P	25	Shlomo Lipetz	February 11, 1979 (aged 44)	R	R	
P	53	Jake Miednik	May 1, 1996 (aged 26)	L	L	
P	41	Kyle Molnar	November 14, 1996 (aged 26)	R	R	
P	0	Bubby Rossman	June 29, 1992 (aged 30)	S	R	Adelaide Giants
P	45	Jacob Steinmetz	July 19, 2003 (aged 19)	R	R	Arizona Diamondbacks (minors)
P	89	Robert Stock	November 21, 1989 (aged 33)	L	R	Milwaukee Brewers (minors)
P	14	Joey Wagman	July 25, 1991 (aged 31)	L	R	Bravos de León
P	57	Zack Weiss	June 16, 1992 (aged 30)	R	R	Los Angeles Angels
P	30	Josh Wolf	September 1, 2000 (aged 22)	R	R	Cleveland Guardians (minors)
C	8	Jakub Goldfarb	June 23, 1996 (aged 26)	L	R	Tri-City Valley Cats
C	36	Ryan Lavarnway	August 7, 1987 (aged 35)	R	R	Melbourne Aces
C	21	Garrett Stubbs	May 26, 1993 (aged 29)	L	R	Philadelphia Phillies
IF	18	Zack Gelof	October 19, 1999 (aged 23)	R	R	Oakland Athletics (minors)
IF	4	Spencer Horwitz	November 14, 1997 (aged 25)	L	R	Toronto Blue Jays (minors)
IF	55	Ty Kelly	July 20, 1988 (aged 34)	S	R	
IF	6	Noah Mendlinger	August 9, 2000 (aged 22)	L	R	St. Louis Cardinals (minors)
IF	27	Matt Mervis	April 16, 1998 (aged 24)	L	R	Chicago Cubs (minors)
IF	19	Danny Valencia	September 19, 1984 (aged 38)	R	R	
IF	38	Michael Wielansky	March 18, 1997 (aged 25)	R	R	Southern Maryland Blue Crabs
OF	40	Alex Dickerson	May 26, 1990 (aged 32)	L	L	Chunichi Dragons
OF	23	Joc Pederson	April 21, 1992 (aged 30)	L	L	San Francisco Giants

=== Nicaragua ===
Nicaragua announced their squad on 2023.

Manager: 7 Sandor Guido

Coaches: Bench 26 Julio Sanchez, Hitting 18 Luis Alen, Pitching 57 Jorge DePaula, 4 Cairo Murillo, First base 59 Jenrry Roa, Third base 2 Franklin Lopez, Batting practice 23 Yader Roa

Pos.	No.	Player	Date of birth (age)	Bats	Throws	Club
P	79	Joaquín Acuña	April 18, 1998 (aged 24)	L	R	Tiburones de La Guaira
P	94	Leo Crawford	February 2, 1997 (aged 26)	L	L	Tri-City Valley Cats
P	30	Fidencio Flores	September 10, 1991 (aged 31)	R	R	Gigantes de Rivas
P	18	Kevin Gadea	December 6, 1994 (aged 28)	R	R	Leones de León
P	41	Osman Gutiérrez	December 15, 1994 (aged 28)	R	R	Tiburones de La Guaira
P	62	Duque Hebbert	October 29, 2001 (aged 21)	R	R	Tren del Norte
P	43	Jonathan Loáisiga	November 2, 1994 (aged 28)	R	R	New York Yankees
P	36	Ronald Medrano	September 17, 1995 (aged 27)	R	R	Gigantes de Rivas
P	32	Dilmer Mejia	July 9, 1997 (aged 25)	L	L	Bravos de Margarita
P	61	Erasmo Ramírez	May 2, 1990 (aged 32)	R	R	Washington Nationals
P	66	J. C. Ramírez	August 16, 1988 (aged 34)	R	R	Leones del Caracas
P	55	Roniel Raudes	January 16, 1998 (aged 25)	R	R	York Revolution
P	12	Carlos Rodríguez	November 27, 2001 (aged 21)	R	R	Milwaukee Brewers (minors)
P	88	Carlos Teller	November 3, 1986 (aged 36)	L	L	Gigantes de Rivas
P	77	Junior Tellez	July 1, 1990 (aged 32)	R	R	Leones de León
P	14	Rodney Theophile	September 16, 1999 (aged 23)	R	R	Washington Nationals (minors)
C	85	Rodolfo Bone	March 22, 2000 (aged 22)	R	R	Tren del Norte
C	91	Melvin Novoa	June 17, 1996 (aged 26)	R	R	Indios del Bóer
IF	1	Benjamín Alegría	August 6, 1997 (aged 25)	R	R	Leones de León
IF	10	Alex Blandino	November 6, 1992 (aged 30)	R	R	Free agent
IF	24	Cheslor Cuthbert	November 16, 1992 (aged 30)	R	R	Gigantes de Rivas
IF	5	Steven Leyton	December 17, 1998 (aged 24)	R	R	Cincinnati Reds (minors)
IF	8	Iván Marín	December 21, 1988 (aged 34)	R	R	Gigantes de Rivas
IF	28	Elian Miranda	May 31, 1999 (aged 23)	R	R	Lake Erie Crushers
IF	17	Milkar Pérez	October 16, 2001 (aged 21)	S	R	Seattle Mariners (minors)
IF	38	Wuillians Vásquez	July 23, 1983 (aged 39)	S	R	Gigantes de Rivas
OF	44	Isaac Benard	January 2, 1996 (aged 27)	L	R	Gateway Grizzlies
OF	9	Sandy Bermúdez	September 8, 1994 (aged 28)	R	R	Tren del Norte
OF	3	Dwight Britton	July 17, 1987 (aged 35)	R	R	Leones de León
IF	99	Juan Montes	May 15, 1995 (aged 27)	S	R	Tren del Norte
OF	19	Norlando Valle	August 2, 1994 (aged 28)	L	L	Tigres de Chinandega

=== Puerto Rico ===
Puerto Rico announced their squad on 2023.

Manager: 4 Yadier Molina

Coaches: Bench 73 Alex Cintrón, Hitting 23 Victor Rodriguez, Assistant hitting 19 Juan González, Pitching 27 Ricky Bones, First base 6 José Molina, Third base 2 Luis Rivera, Bullpen 50 José Rosado

Pos.	No.	Player	Date of birth (age)	Bats	Throws	Club
P	54	Jonathan Bermúdez	September 28, 1996 (aged 26)	L	L	San Francisco Giants (minors)
P	37	José Berríos	May 27, 1994 (aged 28)	R	R	Toronto Blue Jays
P	58	Alex Claudio	January 31, 1992 (aged 31)	L	L	Milwaukee Brewers (minors)
P	28	Fernando Cruz	March 28, 1990 (aged 32)	R	R	Cincinnati Reds
P	87	José De León	August 7, 1992 (aged 30)	R	R	Minnesota Twins (minors)
P	43	Alexis Díaz	September 28, 1996 (aged 26)	R	R	Cincinnati Reds
P	39	Edwin Díaz	March 22, 1994 (aged 28)	R	R	New York Mets
P	35	José Espada	February 22, 1997 (aged 26)	R	R	San Diego Padres (minors)
P	52	Dominic Hamel	March 2, 1999 (aged 24)	R	R	New York Mets (minors)
P	48	Jorge López	February 10, 1993 (aged 30)	R	R	Minnesota Twins
P	64	Anthony Maldonado	February 6, 1998 (aged 25)	R	R	Miami Marlins (minors)
P	16	Jovani Morán	April 24, 1997 (aged 25)	L	L	Minnesota Twins
P	41	Nicholas Padilla	December 24, 1996 (aged 26)	R	R	Chicago White Sox
P	13	Emilio Pagán	May 7, 1991 (aged 31)	L	R	Minnesota Twins
P	45	Luis Quiñones	July 2, 1997 (aged 25)	R	R	Toronto Blue Jays (minors)
P	75	Yacksel Ríos	June 27, 1993 (aged 29)	R	R	Atlanta Braves (minors)
P	30	Dereck Rodríguez	June 5, 1992 (aged 30)	R	R	Minnesota Twins (minors)
P	53	Hector Santiago	December 16, 1987 (aged 35)	R	L	Gigantes de Carolina
P	0	Marcus Stroman	May 1, 1991 (aged 31)	R	R	Chicago Cubs
P	56	Duane Underwood Jr.	July 20, 1994 (aged 28)	R	R	Pittsburgh Pirates
C	15	Martín Maldonado	August 16, 1986 (aged 36)	R	R	Houston Astros
C	10	MJ Melendez	November 29, 1998 (aged 24)	L	R	Kansas City Royals
C	7	Christian Vázquez	August 21, 1990 (aged 32)	R	R	Minnesota Twins
IF	9	Javier Báez	December 1, 1992 (aged 30)	R	R	Detroit Tigers
IF	18	Edwin Díaz	August 25, 1995 (aged 27)	R	R	Boston Red Sox (minors)
IF	5	Enrique Hernández	August 24, 1991 (aged 31)	R	R	Boston Red Sox
IF	12	Francisco Lindor	November 14, 1993 (aged 29)	S	R	New York Mets
IF	31	Vimael Machín	September 25, 1993 (aged 29)	L	R	Philadelphia Phillies (minors)
IF	26	Emmanuel Rivera	June 29, 1996 (aged 26)	R	R	Arizona Diamondbacks
IF	99	Neftalí Soto	February 28, 1989 (aged 34)	R	R	Yokohama DeNA BayStars
OF	14	Henry Ramos	April 15, 1992 (aged 30)	S	R	Cincinnati Reds (minors)
OF	17	Eddie Rosario	September 28, 1991 (aged 31)	L	R	Atlanta Braves
OF	40	Nelson Velázquez	December 26, 1998 (aged 24)	R	R	Chicago Cubs
OF	32	Johneshwy Fargas	December 15, 1994 (aged 28)	R	R	Free agent

=== Venezuela ===
Venezuela announced their squad on 2023.

Manager: 22 Omar López

Coaches: Pitching 72 Iván Arteaga, Third base 23 Ramón Borrego, Hitting 63 Rodolfo Hernández, Bench 64 Carlos Mendoza, First base 12 Rouglas Odor, Bullpen 19 Luis Ramírez, Assistant hitting 52 Wilfredo Romero

Pos.	No.	Player	Date of birth (age)	Bats	Throws	Club
P	46	José Alvarado	May 21, 1995 (aged 27)	L	L	Philadelphia Phillies
P	56	Silvino Bracho	July 17, 1992 (aged 30)	R	R	Cincinnati Reds (minors)
P	58	Endrys Briceño	February 7, 1992 (aged 31)	R	R	Arizona Diamondbacks (minors)
P	5	Max Castillo	May 4, 1999 (aged 23)	R	R	Kansas City Royals
P	45	Jhoulys Chacín	January 7, 1988 (aged 35)	R	R	Leones del Caracas
P	37	Enmanuel De Jesus	December 10, 1996 (aged 26)	L	L	Miami Marlins (minors)
P	47	Edwin Escobar	April 22, 1992 (aged 30)	L	L	Yokohama DeNA BayStars
P	77	Luis García	December 13, 1996 (aged 26)	R	R	Houston Astros
P	38	Norwith Gudiño	November 22, 1995 (aged 27)	R	R	Boston Red Sox (minors)
P	43	Carlos Hernández	March 11, 1997 (aged 25)	R	R	Kansas City Royals
P	60	Darwinzon Hernández	December 17, 1996 (aged 26)	L	L	Baltimore Orioles (minors)
P	3	Elieser Hernández	May 3, 1995 (aged 27)	R	R	New York Mets
P	35	Erick Leal	March 17, 1995 (aged 27)	R	R	Navegantes del Magallanes
P	49	Pablo López	March 7, 1996 (aged 27)	L	R	Minnesota Twins
P	44	Jesús Luzardo	September 30, 1997 (aged 25)	L	L	Miami Marlins
P	59	Andrés Machado	April 22, 1993 (aged 29)	R	R	Washington Nationals (minors)
P	54	Martín Pérez	April 4, 1991 (aged 31)	L	L	Texas Rangers
P	65	José Quijada	November 9, 1995 (aged 27)	L	L	Los Angeles Angels
P	8	Alexis Rivero	October 18, 1994 (aged 28)	R	R	Leones de Ponce
P	57	Eduardo Rodríguez	April 7, 1993 (aged 29)	L	L	Detroit Tigers
P	66	José Ruiz	October 21, 1994 (aged 28)	R	R	Chicago White Sox
P	55	Ranger Suárez	August 26, 1995 (aged 27)	L	L	Philadelphia Phillies
P	18	Anthony Vizcaya	October 24, 1993 (aged 29)	R	R	Navegantes del Magallanes
C	28	Robinson Chirinos	June 5, 1984 (aged 38)	R	R	Navegantes del Magallanes
C	16	Omar Narváez	January 2, 1990 (aged 33)	L	R	New York Mets
C	13	Salvador Pérez	May 10, 1990 (aged 32)	R	R	Kansas City Royals
IF	27	Jose Altuve	May 6, 1990 (aged 32)	R	R	Houston Astros
IF	2	Luis Arráez	April 9, 1997 (aged 25)	L	R	Miami Marlins
IF	24	Miguel Cabrera	April 18, 1983 (aged 39)	R	R	Detroit Tigers
IF	10	Eduardo Escobar	January 5, 1988 (aged 35)	S	R	New York Mets
IF	0	Andrés Giménez	September 4, 1998 (aged 24)	L	R	Cleveland Guardians
IF	15	Hernán Pérez	March 26, 1991 (aged 31)	R	R	Cardenales de Lara
IF	1	Luis Rengifo	February 26, 1997 (aged 26)	S	R	Los Angeles Angels
IF	7	Eugenio Suárez	July 18, 1991 (aged 31)	R	R	Seattle Mariners
IF	14	Gleyber Torres	December 13, 1996 (aged 26)	R	R	New York Yankees
OF	42	Ronald Acuña Jr.	December 18, 1997 (aged 25)	R	R	Atlanta Braves
OF	6	David Peralta	August 14, 1987 (aged 35)	L	L	Los Angeles Dodgers
OF	25	Anthony Santander	October 19, 1994 (aged 28)	S	R	Baltimore Orioles

=== Dominican Republic ===
Dominican Republic announced their squad on January 18, 2023.

Manager: 10 Rodney Linares

Coaches: Bench 46 Tony Diaz, Hitting 54 Luis Ortiz, Assistant hitting 90 Frank Valdez, Pitching 68 Wellington Cepeda, Assistant pitching 45 José Canó, First base 29 Julio Borbón, Third base 39 Ramón Santiago

Pos.	No.	Player	Date of birth (age)	Bats	Throws	Club
P	52	Bryan Abreu	April 22, 1997 (aged 25)	R	R	Houston Astros
P	20	Sandy Alcántara	September 7, 1995 (aged 27)	R	R	Miami Marlins
P	92	Génesis Cabrera	October 10, 1996 (aged 26)	L	L	St. Louis Cardinals
P	63	Diego Castillo	January 18, 1994 (aged 29)	R	R	Seattle Mariners
P	59	Roansy Contreras	November 17, 1999 (aged 23)	R	R	Pittsburgh Pirates
P	47	Johnny Cueto	February 15, 1986 (aged 37)	R	R	Miami Marlins
P	75	Camilo Doval	July 4, 1997 (aged 25)	R	R	San Francisco Giants
P	66	Luis García	January 30, 1987 (aged 36)	R	R	San Diego Padres
P	93	Yimi García	August 18, 1990 (aged 32)	R	R	(Canada) Toronto Blue Jays
P	53	Cristian Javier	March 26, 1997 (aged 25)	R	R	(United States) Houston Astros
P	48	Rafael Montero	October 17, 1990 (aged 32)	R	R	(United States) Houston Astros
P	50	Héctor Neris	June 14, 1989 (aged 33)	R	R	(United States) Houston Astros
P	72	Luis Ortiz	January 27, 1999 (aged 24)	R	R	(United States) Pittsburgh Pirates
P	30	César Valdez	March 17, 1985 (aged 37)	R	R	(United States) Los Angeles Angels
C	21	Francisco Mejía	October 27, 1995 (aged 27)	S	R	(United States) Tampa Bay Rays
C	35	Gary Sánchez	December 2, 1992 (aged 30)	R	R	Free agent
IF	27	Willy Adames	September 25, 1995 (aged 27)	R	R	(United States) Milwaukee Brewers
IF	7	Jeimer Candelario	November 24, 1993 (aged 29)	S	R	(United States) Washington Nationals
IF	24	Robinson Canó	October 22, 1982 (aged 40)	L	R	Free agent
IF	11	Rafael Devers	October 24, 1996 (aged 26)	L	R	(United States) Boston Red Sox
IF	5	Wander Franco	February 1, 2001 (aged 22)	S	R	(United States) Tampa Bay Rays
IF	13	Manny Machado	July 6, 1992 (aged 30)	R	R	(United States) San Diego Padres
IF	4	Ketel Marte	October 12, 1993 (aged 29)	S	R	(United States) Arizona Diamondbacks
IF	3	Jeremy Peña	September 22, 1997 (aged 25)	R	R	(United States) Houston Astros
IF	9	Jean Segura	March 17, 1990 (aged 32)	R	R	(United States) Miami Marlins
OF	37	Teoscar Hernández	October 15, 1992 (aged 30)	R	R	(United States) Seattle Mariners
OF	74	Eloy Jiménez	November 27, 1996 (aged 26)	R	R	(United States) Chicago White Sox
OF	44	Julio Rodríguez	December 29, 2000 (aged 22)	R	R	(United States) Seattle Mariners
OF	22	Juan Soto	October 25, 1998 (aged 24)	L	L	(United States) San Diego Padres
DH	23	Nelson Cruz	June 1, 1980 (aged 42)	R	R	(United States) San Diego Padres

Preceded by 2017	World Baseball Classic rosters	Succeeded by 2026
