= 2026 World Baseball Classic qualification rosters =

Rosters for 2026 World Baseball Classic Qualification tournament

This article shows the rosters of all participating teams in the 2026 World Baseball Classic qualification tournament. The rosters for the pool in Taipei, Taiwan were officially announced on February 3, 2025. Rosters for the pool in Tucson, Arizona were announced on February 13, 2025.

== Pool A ==
=== Chinese Taipei ===
Chinese Taipei's roster was announced on February 3, 2025. The roster was updated on February 19, 2025.

Manager
(Taiwan) 99 Tseng Hao-jiu
Coaches
66 Chien-Ming Chang (first base/outfield), 31 Chiang-Ho Chen (third base), 34 Chih-Kang Kao (bench/catching), 70 Yueh-Ping Lin, 23 Cheng-Min Peng (hitting)

Player	No.	Pos.	Date of birth (age)	Team	League	Birthplace
Bo-Hao Chen	9	P	January 28, 1999 (aged 26)	(Taiwan) Rakuten Monkeys	Chinese Professional Baseball League	(Taiwan)
Po-Yu Chen	44	P	October 2, 2001 (aged 23)	(United States) Pittsburgh Pirates (minors)	Major League Baseball	(Taiwan) Taoyuan City
Yu-Hung Chen	77	P	May 12, 2001 (aged 23)	(Taiwan) TSG Hawks	Chinese Professional Baseball League	(Taiwan)
Yun-Wen Chen	12	P	November 28, 1995 (aged 29)	(Taiwan) Uni-President 7-Eleven Lions	Chinese Professional Baseball League	(Taiwan) Pingtung County
Jo-Hsi Hsu	69	P	November 1, 2000 (aged 24)	(Taiwan) Wei Chuan Dragons	Chinese Professional Baseball League	(Taiwan)
Siang-Sheng Hsu	29	P	December 17, 2005 (aged 19)	(Japan) Yakult Swallows	Nippon Professional Baseball	(Taiwan)
Dong-Ming Li	16	P	December 29, 1999 (aged 25)	(Taiwan) Fubon Guardians	Chinese Professional Baseball League	(Taiwan)
Ruei-Yang Gu Lin	11	P	June 12, 2000 (aged 24)	(Taiwan) Uni-President 7-Eleven Lions	Chinese Professional Baseball League	(Taiwan)
Wei-En Lin	45	P	November 4, 2005 (aged 19)	(United States) Oakland Athletics (minors)	Major League Baseball	(Taiwan) Taoyuan
Yen-Ching Lu	58	P	March 10, 1996 (aged 28)	(Taiwan) CTBC Brothers	Chinese Professional Baseball League	(Taiwan)
Yung-Chen Lu	37	P	December 24, 1998 (aged 26)	(Taiwan) Rakuten Monkeys	Chinese Professional Baseball League	(Taiwan)
Tzu-Chen Sha	98	P	October 15, 2003 (aged 21)	(United States) Oakland Athletics (minors)	Major League Baseball	(Taiwan) Taipei
Sun Yi-Lei	96	P	February 10, 2005 (aged 20)	(Japan) Hokkaido Nippon Ham Fighters	Nippon Professional Baseball	(Taiwan) Taipei
Jyun-Yue Tseng	60	P	November 7, 2001 (aged 23)	(Taiwan) Fubon Guardians	Chinese Professional Baseball League	(Taiwan)
Yu-Cheng Wu	55	P	February 15, 2004 (aged 21)	(Taiwan) TSG Hawks	Chinese Professional Baseball League	(Taiwan)
Chen Zhong-ao Zhuang	48	P	August 25, 2000 (aged 24)	(United States) Oakland Athletics (minors)	Major League Baseball	(Taiwan) Taipei
Chung-Yu Chen	65	C	September 14, 1995 (aged 29)	(Taiwan) Uni-President 7-Eleven Lions	Chinese Professional Baseball League	(Taiwan)
Shao-Hong Jiang	63	C	July 13, 1997 (aged 27)	(Taiwan) Wei Chuan Dragons	Chinese Professional Baseball League	(Taiwan)
Yu-Chieh Kao	17	C	July 17, 1997 (aged 27)	(Taiwan) CTBC Brothers	Chinese Professional Baseball League	(Taiwan)
Yu Chang	18	IF	August 18, 1995 (aged 29)	(Taiwan) Fubon Guardians	Chinese Professional Baseball League	(Taiwan) Taitung County
Tzu-Yu Tseng	8	IF	September 16, 2003 (aged 21)	(Taiwan) TSG Hawks	Chinese Professional Baseball League	(Taiwan)
Tsung-Hsien Lee	22	IF	June 17, 1994 (aged 30)	(Taiwan) Fubon Guardians	Chinese Professional Baseball League	(Taiwan)
Tzu-Wei Lin	15	IF	February 15, 1994 (aged 31)	(Taiwan) Rakuten Monkeys	Chinese Professional Baseball League	(Taiwan) Kaohsiung County
Po-Hsuan Wang	6	IF	April 1, 2000 (aged 24)	(Taiwan) TSG Hawks	Chinese Professional Baseball League	(Taiwan)
Nien-Ting Wu	39	IF	June 7, 1993 (aged 31)	(Taiwan) TSG Hawks	Chinese Professional Baseball League	(Taiwan) Taipei
Chieh-Hsien Chen	24	OF	January 7, 1994 (aged 31)	(Taiwan) Uni-President 7-Eleven Lions	Chinese Professional Baseball League	(Taiwan) Kaohsiung City
Tzu-Hao Chen	1	OF	July 29, 1995 (aged 29)	(Taiwan) CTBC Brothers	Chinese Professional Baseball League	(Taiwan)
Wun-Jie Chen	3	OF	October 11, 1997 (aged 27)	(Taiwan) TSG Hawks	Chinese Professional Baseball League	(Taiwan)
Cheng-Jui Sung	88	OF	August 14, 2002 (aged 22)	(Taiwan) CTBC Brothers	Chinese Professional Baseball League	(Taiwan)

=== Nicaragua ===
Nicaragua's roster was announced on February 3, 2025. Cheslor Cuthbert was originally announced as part of the Nicaraguan team, but was replaced by Chase Dawson due to injury. Rodolfo Bone was originally announced on the team roster, but was revealed to be on the team's coaching staff as a bullpen catcher and was replaced by Freddvil Chevez.

Manager
(Nicaragua) 7 Sandor Guido
Coaches
26 Julio Sánchez (bench), 56 Lenin Picota (pitching), 4 Cairo Murillo (bullpen) 33 Anibal Vega (first base), 3 Dorian García (third base), 22 Rodolfo Bone (bullpen catcher)

Player	No.	Pos.	Date of birth (age)	Team	League	Birthplace
Kenword Burton	10	P	February 2, 1997 (aged 28)	(Nicaragua) Indios del Bóer	Nicaraguan Professional Baseball League	(Nicaragua) Bluefields, RACCS
Leonardo Crawford	72	P	February 2, 1997 (aged 28)	(Mexico) Rieleros de Aguascalientes	Mexican Baseball League	(Nicaragua) Puerto Cabezas
Fidencio Flores	30	P	October 9, 1991 (aged 33)	(Nicaragua) Gigantes de Rivas	Nicaraguan Professional Baseball League	(Nicaragua) El Sauce, León
Jesús Garrido	77	P	May 10, 1995 (aged 29)	(Nicaragua) Gigantes de Rivas	Nicaraguan Professional Baseball League	(Nicaragua) Chinandega
Ernesto Glasgon	29	P	September 14, 1991 (aged 33)	(Nicaragua) Leones de Leon	Nicaraguan Professional Baseball League	(Nicaragua) Managua
Yeris Gonzalez	44	P	July 4, 1996 (aged 28)	(Nicaragua) Tigres de Chinandega	Nicaraguan Professional Baseball League	(Nicaragua) Jinotega
Ronald Medrano	36	P	September 17, 1995 (aged 29)	(Mexico) Rieleros de Aguascalientes	Mexican Baseball League	(Nicaragua) Managua
Dilmer Mejia	32	P	July 9, 1997 (aged 27)	(Nicaragua) Leones de León	Nicaraguan Professional Baseball League	(Nicaragua) El Sauce, León
Angel Obando	31	P	January 19, 1999 (aged 26)	(Nicaragua) Gigantes de Rivas	Nicaraguan Professional Baseball League	(Nicaragua) El Sauce, Managua
J. C. Ramirez	66	P	August 16, 1988 (aged 36)	(Venezuela) Navegantes del Magallanes	Venezuelan Professional Baseball League	(Nicaragua) Managua
Carlos Teller	37	P	October 3, 1986 (aged 38)	(Nicaragua) Gigantes de Rivas	Nicaraguan Professional Baseball League	(Nicaragua) Managua
Bryan Torres	78	P	April 12, 2001 (aged 23)	(Nicaragua) Gigantes de Rivas	Nicaraguan Professional Baseball League	(Nicaragua) León
Axel Zapata	88	P	April 29, 2001 (aged 23)	(Nicaragua) Tigres de Chinandega	Nicaraguan Professional Baseball League	(Nicaragua) Chinandega
Melvin Novoa	27	C	June 17, 1996 (aged 28)	(Nicaragua) Indios del Bóer	Nicaraguan Professional Baseball League	(Nicaragua) Nandaime, Granada
Ronald Rivera	25	C	November 28, 1993 (aged 31)	(Nicaragua) Tigres de Chinandega	Nicaraguan Professional Baseball League	(Nicaragua) Chinandega
Bejamin Alegria	1	IF	August 6, 1997 (aged 27)	(Nicaragua) Gigantes de Rivas	Major League Baseball	(Nicaragua) Managua
Freddvil Chevez	14	IF	March 15, 2000 (aged 24)	(Nicaragua) Indios del Bóer	Nicaraguan Professional Baseball League	(Nicaragua) Masaya
Brandon Leyton	5	IF	December 17, 1998 (aged 26)	(Nicaragua) Tigres de Chinandega	Nicaraguan Professional Baseball League	(Nicaragua) Managua
Elian Miranda	28	IF	May 31, 1996 (aged 28)	(Nicaragua) Tren del Norte	Nicaraguan Professional Baseball League	(Nicaragua) El Viejo, Chinandega
Emanuel Trujillo	18	IF	October 19, 2001 (aged 23)	(Nicaragua) Tigres de Chinandega	Nicaraguan Professional Baseball League	(Nicaragua) Chinandega
Freddy Zamora	23	IF	November 1, 1998 (aged 26)	(United States) Milwaukee Brewers (minors)	Major League Baseball	(Nicaragua) León Department
Chase Dawson	97	OF	June 12, 1997 (aged 27)	(Nicaragua) Leones de León	Nicaraguan Professional Baseball League	(United States) Chesterton, Indiana
Omar Mendoza	45	OF	October 30, 1997 (aged 27)	(Nicaragua) Tigres de Chinandega	Nicaraguan Professional Baseball League	(Nicaragua) Managua
Juan Montes	99	OF	May 15, 1995 (aged 29)	(Nicaragua) Tren del Norte	Nicaraguan Professional Baseball League	Guatemala City
Jose Orozco	20	OF	June 3, 1993 (aged 31)	Free agent		(Nicaragua) Matagalpa
Elian Rayo	48	OF	March 4, 2003 (aged 21)	(United States) San Francisco Giants (minors)	Major League Baseball	(Nicaragua) Ciudad Dario, Matagalpa
Cristhian Sandoval	95	OF	May 9, 2000 (aged 24)	(Nicaragua) Gigantes de Rivas	Nicaraguan Professional Baseball League	(Nicaragua) Juigalpa

=== South Africa ===
South Africa's roster was announced on February 3, 2025.

Manager
(South Africa) Neil Adonis
Coaches
Jody Burch, Dean McKinnon, Darryn Smith, Erick Threets, Paul Van der Merwe

Player	No.	Pos.	Date of birth (age)	Team	League	Birthplace
Vince Deyzel	26	P	February 9, 1998 (aged 27)			(South Africa) Durban, KwaZulu-Natal
Rowan Ebersohn	32	P	April 16, 1996 (aged 28)	(South Africa) Benoni Indians	South African Baseball League	(South Africa) Johannesburg, Gauteng
Jared Elario	27	P	October 14, 1988 (aged 36)			(South Africa) Cape Town, Western Cape
Justin Erasmus	22	P	January 22, 1990 (aged 35)			(South Africa) Johannesburg, Gauteng
Dean Jacobs	12	P	September 21, 1991 (aged 33)	(South Africa) Athlone A’s	Cape Town Baseball Federation	(South Africa) Cape Town, Western Cape
Damon King	28	P	August 21, 1997 (aged 27)	(South Africa) Benoni Indians	South African Baseball League	(South Africa) Johannesburg, Gauteng
Daniel Mendelsohn	54	P	February 9, 1996 (aged 26)			(South Africa) Pietermaritzburg, KwaZulu-Natal
Anthony Sayers	48	P	December 6, 2000 (aged 24)			(South Africa) Benoni, Gauteng
Brandon Smith	1	P	February 12, 2000 (aged 25)	(Czech Republic) Arrows Ostrava	Extraliga	(South Africa) Durban, KwaZulu-Natal
Lloyd Stevens	7	P	March 24, 1998 (aged 26)			(South Africa) Cape Town, Western Cape
Josh Tribe	18	P	August 20, 2003 (aged 21)			(South Africa) Durban, KwaZulu-Natal
Dylan Unsworth	50	P	September 23, 1992 (aged 32)			(South Africa) Durban, KwaZulu-Natal
Jarryd White	3	P	April 8, 2002 (aged 22)			(South Africa) Johannesburg, Gauteng
Dayle Feldtman	31	C	February 4, 1991 (aged 31)	(South Africa) Western Cape	South African Baseball League	(South Africa) Cape Town, Western Cape
Tyrone Milne	10	C	February 20, 1997 (aged 28)	(South Africa) Bellville Tygers	Cape Town Baseball Federation	(South Africa) Cape Town, Western Cape
Luke November	34	C	March 14, 2001 (aged 23)			(South Africa) Cape Town, Western Cape
Matthew Diedericks	6	IF	May 13, 1998 (aged 26)			(South Africa) Cape Town, Western Cape
Victor Ngoepe	9	IF	February 9, 1998 (aged 24)			(South Africa) Polokwane, Limpopo
Josh November	5	IF	November 30, 2005 (aged 19)			(South Africa) Cape Town, Western Cape
Anthony Phillips	23	IF	April 11, 1990 (aged 34)	Free agent		(South Africa) Bellville, Western Cape
Jonathan Phillips	14	IF	April 16, 1986 (aged 38)	(South Africa) Western Cape	South African Baseball League	(South Africa) Cape Town, Western Cape
Tyler Smith	2	IF	November 4, 1997 (aged 27)	(Czech Republic) Hrosi Brno	Extraliga	(South Africa) Durban, KwaZulu-Natal
Christiaan Beyers	17	OF	May 17, 1995 (aged 29)	(Germany) Bonn Capitals	Bundesliga	(South Africa) Cape Town,Western Cape
Brandon Bouillon	21	OF	March 21, 1989 (aged 35)	(South Africa) Gauteng	South African Baseball League	(South Africa) Johannesburg, Gauteng
Jason Carelse	20	OF	April 16, 1996 (aged 26)	(South Africa) Athlone A’s	Cape Town Baseball Federation	(South Africa) Cape Town, Western Cape
Brandon Edmunds	11	OF	January 9, 1989 (aged 36)			(South Africa) Johannesburg, Gauteng
Joshua Wentzel	29	OF	May 16, 2000 (aged 24)			(South Africa) Cape Town, Western Cape

=== Spain ===
Spain's roster was announced on February 3, 2025. Luis Guillorme was officially announced as part of the team, but was later replaced by Yancarlo Franco.

Manager
(Venezuela) Nelson Prada
Coaches
Candelario Diaz, Eduardo Dominguez, Aritz Garcia Goni, Nestor Pérez, Manu Olivera, Adam Jones

Player	No.	Pos.	Date of birth (age)	Team	League	Birthplace
Daniel Álvarez	32	P	June 28, 1996 (aged 28)	(Venezuela) Tigres de Aragua	Venezuelan Professional Baseball League	(Venezuela) Barquisimeto
Fernando Báez	12	P	February 1, 1992 (aged 33)	San Marino Baseball	Serie A	(Dominican Republic) Sabana Grande de Palenque
Jorge Balboa	23	P	July 15, 2004 (aged 20)	(Spain) CB Viladecans	División de Honor de Béisbol	(Spain) San Sebastián
Vicente Campos	34	P	July 27, 1992 (aged 32)	Free agent		(Venezuela) La Guaira
Rhiner Cruz	55	P	November 1, 1986 (aged 38)	Free agent		(Dominican Republic) Santo Domingo
Anderson De Leon	3	P	July 27, 1996 (aged 28)	San Marino Baseball	Serie A	(United States) Brooklyn, New York
Yeudy García	20	P	October 6, 1992 (aged 32)	(United States) Hagerstown Flying Boxcars	Atlantic League	(Dominican Republic) Sabana Yegua
Pablo Guillén	27	P	June 21, 1998 (aged 26)	Free agent		(Cuba) Villa Clara
Elián Leyva	53	P	March 17, 1989 (aged 35)	(Mexico) Leones de Yucatán	Mexican League	(Cuba) Havana
Yoanner Negrín	37	P	April 29, 1984 (aged 40)	(Mexico) Leones de Yucatán	Mexican League	(Cuba) Havana
Andrés Perez	36	P	October 22, 1999 (aged 25)	Free agent		(Venezuela) Caracas
Orlando Rodríguez	42	P	December 16, 1995 (aged 29)	(Mexico) Dorados de Chihuahua	Mexican League	(United States) Miami Gardens, Florida
Ramon Rosso	26	P	June 9, 1996 (aged 28)	Free agent		(Dominican Republic) Santo Domingo
Lowuin Sacramento	45	P	September 17, 1995 (aged 26)	(Spain) Astros de Valencia	División de Honor de Béisbol	(Venezuela) El Tigre
Elio Silva	28	P	August 21, 1995 (aged 27)	(Spain) San Inazio Beisbol	División de Honor de Béisbol	(Venezuela) Maracay
Andres Angulo	2	C	September 25, 1997 (aged 27)	Free agent		(Colombia) Cali
Gabriel Lino	43	C	May 17, 1993 (aged 31)	(Mexico) Guerreros de Oaxaca	Mexican League	(Venezuela) Maracay
Carlos Colmenarez	1	IF	November 15, 2003 (aged 21)	(United States) Tampa Bay Rays (minors)	Major League Baseball	(Venezuela) San Felipe, Yaracuy
Wander Encarnacion	11	IF	January 25, 2000 (aged 25)	(Italy) Parma Clima	Serie A	(Dominican Republic) Santo Domingo
Yancarlo Franco	5	IF	August 29, 1988 (aged 36)	Free agent		(Dominican Republic) Ansonia
Edgar Rondon	24	IF	August 20, 1994 (aged 30)	Free agent		(Dominican Republic) San Pedro de Macoris
Jesús Ustariz	16	IF	April 26, 1993 (aged 31)	San Marino Baseball	Serie A	(Venezuela) Caracas
Edison Valerio	19	IF	August 20, 1994 (aged 30)	(Spain) Astros de Valencia	División de Honor de Béisbol	(Dominican Republic) Santo Domingo
Engel Beltré	7	OF	November 1, 1989 (aged 32)	Free agent		(Dominican Republic) Santo Domingo
Frank Hernández	29	OF	December 10, 2001 (aged 23)	(United States) Chicago Cubs (minors)	Major League Baseball	(Cuba) Havana
Daniel Jiménez	10	OF	April 23, 1996 (aged 28)	Free agent		(Venezuela) Caracas
Chris Kwitzer	14	OF	January 26, 1995 (aged 30)	(United States) New York Boulders	Frontier League	(United States) Buffalo, New York
Félix Stevens	9	OF	July 30, 1999 (aged 25)	(United States) Chicago Cubs (minors)	Major League Baseball	(Cuba) Havana

== Pool B ==
=== Brazil ===
Brazil announced their coaching staff on January 25, 2025. The full roster was announced on February 15, 2025.

Manager
(Brazil) 82 Yuichi Matsumoto
Coaches
23 Thiago Caldeira (bench), 25 André Rienzo (pitching), 36 Reinaldo Sato (hitting/infield), 16 Paulo Orlando (hitting/outfield), 74 Kléber Ojima (bullpen)

Player	No.	Pos.	Date of birth (age)	Team	League	Birthplace
Tiago Da Silva	22	P	March 28, 1985 (aged 39)	(Mexico) Caliente de Durango	Mexican League	(Brazil) São Paulo, São Paulo
Caio de Araujo	28	P	February 7, 2002 (aged 23)	(United States) Alabama State Hornets	NCAA	(Brazil) Jundiaí, São Paulo
Murilo Gouvea	34	P	September 15, 1988 (aged 36)	(Brazil) Atibaia	Brazilian Baseball Championship	(Brazil) Santo André, São Paulo
Hugo Kanabushi	66	P	May 22, 1989 (aged 35)	(Brazil) Marília	Brazilian Baseball Championship	(Brazil) Alto Parana
Pedro Lemos	39	P	May 22, 2003 (aged 21)	(United States) Seattle Mariners (minors)	Major League Baseball	(Brazil) Santo André, São Paulo
Oscar Nakaoshi	14	P	March 28, 1991 (aged 33)	(Australia) Adelaide Giants	Australian Baseball League	(Brazil) São Paulo, São Paulo
Joao Gabriel Marostica	21	P	November 8, 2004 (aged 20)	(Japan) Tochigi Golden Braves	Baseball Challenge League	(Brazil) Mirandópolis, São Paulo
Rafael Ohashi	2	P	October 8, 2002 (aged 22)	Free agent		(Brazil) Mogi Guaçu, São Paulo
Eric Pardinho	43	P	January 5, 2001 (aged 24)	(Canada) Toronto Blue Jays (minors)	Major League Baseball	(Brazil) Lucélia, São Paulo
Enzo Sawayama	19	P	October 15, 2003 (aged 21)	(Japan) Yamaha	Industrial League	(Japan) Hamamatsu
Bo Takahashi	18	P	January 23, 1997 (aged 28)	(Japan) Seibu Lions	Nippon Professional Baseball	(Brazil) Presidente Prudente, São Paulo
Heitor Tokar	41	P	October 25, 2000 (aged 24)	(Mexico) Dorados de Chihuahua	Mexican League	(Brazil) Marília, São Paulo
Arthur Tsujiguchi	11	P	August 12, 1995 (aged 29)	(Japan) Nihon Wellness Sports University		(Japan) Tokyo
Hector Villarroel	4	P	August 12, 1995 (aged 29)	(Brazil) Atibaia	Brazilian Baseball Championship	(Venezuela) El Tigre, Anzoátegui
Gabriel do Carmo	7	C	March 31, 2004 (aged 20)	(France) Cougars de Montigny	Championnat de France de baseball	(Brazil) Atibaia, São Paulo
Gabriel Gomes	10	C	March 31, 2004 (aged 20)	(United States) Cincinnati Reds (minors)	Major League Baseball	(Brazil) Atibaia, São Paulo
Matheus Lelis	9	C	June 12, 2002 (aged 22)	(Brazil) Nippon Blue Jays	Brazilian Baseball Championship	(Brazil) Bastos, São Paulo
Vitor Ito	1	IF	February 16, 1995 (aged 30)	(Brazil) Marília	Brazilian Baseball Championship	(Brazil) Marília, São Paulo
Felipe Mizukosi	54	IF	November 26, 1994 (aged 30)	(Brazil) Gecebs	Brazilian Baseball Championship	(Brazil) São Paulo, São Paulo
Tiago Nishyama	12	IF	November 20, 2005 (aged 19)	(Japan) Nittaidai		(Brazil) São Paulo, São Paulo
Leonardo Reginatto	5	IF	April 10, 1990 (aged 34)	(Mexico) Tigres de Quintana Roo	Mexican League	(Brazil) Curitiba, Paraná
Lucas Rojo	15	IF	April 4, 1994 (aged 30)	(Japan) Kitakyushu Shimonoseki Phoenix	Kyushu Asian League	(Brazil) São Roque, São Paulo
Dante Bichette Jr.	77	OF	September 26, 1992 (aged 32)	Free agent		(United States) Orlando, Florida
Gabriel Maciel	3	OF	January 10, 1999 (aged 26)	(United States) Sussex County Miners	Frontier League	(Brazil) Londrina, Paraná
Victor Mascai	17	OF	February 10, 2001 (aged 24)	(Japan) Tochigi Golden Braves	Baseball Challenge League	(Brazil) Marília, São Paulo
Lucas Ramirez	24	OF	January 16, 2006 (aged 19)	(United States) Los Angeles Angels (minors)	Major League Baseball	(United States) Weston, Florida
Daniel Yonemura	70	OF	May 11, 1991 (aged 33)	Free agent		(Brazil) Porto Velho, Rondônia

=== China ===
China's full roster was announced on February 15, 2025.

Manager
(China) 66 Li Wei

Coaches
67 Han Guojun (bench), 57 Zhang Jian (pitching), 21 Ray Chang (hitting), 56 Wang Wei (bullpen),

Player	No.	Pos.	Date of birth (age)	Team	League	Birthplace
Roger Rang	99	P	January 16, 2002 (aged 23)	(China) Guangdong Leopards	China National Baseball League	(China) Qinghai
Li Yuyang	27	P	February 7, 2001 (aged 24)	(China) Sichuan Dragons	China National Baseball League	(China) Sichuan
Sun Guangxuang	32	P	August 3, 2006 (aged 18)	(China) Tianjin Lions	China National Baseball League	(China) Tianjin
Tom Sun	35	P	December 14, 2000 (aged 24)	(United States) Augustana Vikings	NCAA Division II	(China) Beijing
Suo Xudi	10	P	April 1, 2002 (aged 22)	(China) Beijing Tigers	China National Baseball League	(China) Hebei
Wang Xiang	42	P	November 28, 2003 (aged 21)	(China) Shanghai Golden Eagles	China National Baseball League	(China) Jilin Province
Wu Haizheng	11	P	June 27, 2000 (aged 24)	(China) Beijing Tigers	China National Baseball League	(China) Beijing
Jeremy Wu-Yelland	18	P	June 24, 1999 (aged 25)	(United States) Boston Red Sox (minors)	Major League Baseball	(United States) Seattle, Washington
Yi Jian	15	P	February 9, 2001 (aged 24)	(China) Guangdong Leopards	China National Baseball League	(China) Guangdong Province
Zhang Mingxin	34	P	November 13, 2001 (aged 23)	(China) Shandong Blue Whales	China National Baseball League	(China) Heilongjiang
Alan Zhang Carter	38	P	December 16, 1997 (aged 27)	(United States) Lake Country DockHounds	American Association	Singapore, Singapore
Zhao Lun	1	P	August 29, 2001 (aged 23)	MLB DC China	China National Baseball League	(China) Henan
Zhao Wei	12	P	September 20, 2002 (aged 22)	(China) Sichuan Dragons	China National Baseball League	(China) Inner Mongolia
Zhou Jie	37	P	July 9, 2001 (aged 23)	(China) Taijin Lions	China National Baseball League	(China) Tianjin
Li Ning	9	C	November 12, 1994 (aged 30)	(China) Shanghai Golden Eagles	China National Baseball League	(China) Inner Mongolia
Wang Shuai	52	C	January 7, 2002 (aged 23)	(China) Tianjin Lions	China National Baseball League	(China) Tianjin
Zhou Yi	55	C	November 8, 2004 (aged 20)	(China) Guangdong Leopards	China National Baseball League	(China) Beijing
Chen Jiaji	25	IF	December 1, 1999 (aged 25)	(China) Tianjin Lions	China National Baseball League	(China) Tianjin
Hu Tianyuan	40	IF	February 6, 2000 (aged 25)	(China) Beijing Tigers	China National Baseball League	(China) Beijing
Lu Yun	2	IF	February 7, 1997 (aged 28)	(China) Beijing Tigers	China National Baseball League	(China) Beijing
Luo Jinjun	29	IF	January 8, 1995 (aged 30)	(China) Guangdong Leopards	China National Baseball League	(China) Guangdong
Wu Qirui	14	IF	April 30, 2002 (aged 22)	(China) Guangdong Leopards	China National Baseball League	(China) Anhui
Yang Jin	7	IF	November 18, 1998 (aged 26)	(China) Shanghai Eagles	China National Baseball League	(China) Shanghai
Samuel Benjamin	4	OF	April 1, 2002 (aged 22)	(United States) Lake Country DockHounds	American Association	(United States) Walnut Creek, California
Du Nan	3	OF	October 18, 1997 (aged 27)	(China) Tianjin Lions	China National Baseball League	(China) Tianjin
Liang Pei	6	OF	April 14, 1998 (aged 26)	(China) Beijing Tigers	China National Baseball League	(China) Beijing
Xing Wenbin	43	OF	August 8, 2001 (aged 23)	(China) Sichuan Dragons	China National Baseball League	(China) Sichuan
Zhu Xudong	51	OF	December 5, 2002 (aged 22)	(China) Jiangsu Pegasus	China National Baseball League	(China) Jiangsu Province

=== Colombia ===
Colombia's full roster was announced on February 15, 2025. A roster update was announced on February 24, 2025. Guillermo Moscoso replaced Nabil Crismatt, Guillermo Quintana replaced Jorge Alfaro, and Jose Ramos replaced Carlos Arroyo. The next day, José Quintana withdrew due to signing with an MLB organization, replaced by Carlos Ocampo.

Manager
(Colombia) 15 José Mosquera
Coaches
19 Jhonatan Solano (bench), 14 Dayan Diaz (pitching), 18 Jair Fernandez (hitting), 5 Jaime Del Valle (first base), 10 Ronald Ramirez (third base)

Player	No.	Pos.	Date of birth (age)	Team	League	Birthplace
Adrian Almeida	32	P	February 25, 1995 (aged 30)	(United States) Charleston Dirty Birds	Atlantic League	(Venezuela) Puerto Cabello
Danis Correa	53	P	August 26, 1999 (aged 25)	(United States) Oakland Athletics (minors)	Major League Baseball	(Colombia) Cartagena
Luis Escobar	78	P	May 30, 1996 (aged 28)	(Colombia) Tigres de Cartagena	Colombian Professional Baseball League	(Colombia) Cartagena
Pedro García	72	P	March 21, 1995 (aged 29)	(United States) Cincinnati Reds (minors)	Major League Baseball	(Venezuela) Maracaibo
Rio Gomez	47	P	October 20, 1994 (aged 30)	(Taiwan) Wei Chuan Dragons	Chinese Professional Baseball League	(United States) Miami
Yapson Gomez	30	P	October 2, 1993 (aged 31)	(Mexico) Caliente de Durango	Mexican League	(Venezuela) San Cristóbal
Jean Herrera	61	P	November 14, 2000 (aged 24)	(Colombia) Caimanes de Barranquilla	Colombian Professional Baseball League	(Colombia) Cartagena
David Lorduy	31	P	October 15, 2003 (aged 21)	(United States) Cincinnati Reds (minors)	Major League Baseball	(Colombia) Sincelejo
Guillermo Moscoso	74	P	November 14, 1983 (aged 41)	(Venezuela) Tigres de Aragua	Venezuelan Professional Baseball League	(Venezuela) Maracay
Carlos Ocampo	62	P	September 3, 1998 (aged 26)	(Colombia) Vaqueros de Montería	Colombian Professional Baseball League	(Colombia) Cartagena
Jhon Romero	26	P	January 17, 1995 (aged 30)	(Venezuela) Leones del Caracas	Venezuelan Professional Baseball League	(Colombia) Cartagena
Reiver Sanmartín	52	P	April 15, 1996 (aged 28)	(United States) Cincinnati Reds (minors)	Major League Baseball	(Colombia) Cartagena
Julio Teherán	49	P	January 27, 1991 (aged 34)	(Mexico) Sultanes de Monterrey	Mexican League	(Colombia) Cartagena
Ezequiel Zabaleta	39	P	August 20, 1995 (aged 29)	(Colombia) Caimanes de Barranquilla	Colombian Professional Baseball League	(Colombia) Bolívar
Jair Camargo	77	C	July 1, 1999 (aged 25)	(United States) Minnesota Twins	Major League Baseball	(Colombia) Barranquilla
Carlos Martínez	27	C	May 2, 1995 (aged 29)	(Dominican Republic) Estrellas Orientales	Dominican Professional Baseball League	(Colombia) Cartagena
Guillermo Quintana	4	C	March 16, 2001 (aged 23)	(United States) Gary SouthShore RailCats	American Association	(Colombia) Cartagena
Francisco Acuña	10	IF	January 12, 2000 (aged 25)	(United States) San Diego Padres (minors)	Major League Baseball	(Colombia) Barranquilla
Jose Ramos	1	IF	October 25, 2002 (aged 22)	(United States) San Francisco Giants (minors)	Major League Baseball	(Colombia) Monteria
Michael Arroyo	8	IF	October 22, 2004 (aged 20)	(United States) Seattle Mariners (minors)	Major League Baseball	(Colombia) Cartagena
Fabián Pertuz	11	IF	September 1, 2000 (aged 24)	(United States) Chicago Cubs (minors)	Major League Baseball	(Colombia) Barranquilla
Reynaldo Rodríguez	16	IF	July 2, 1986 (aged 38)	(Mexico) Guerreros de Oaxaca	Mexican League	(Colombia) Cartagena
Gio Urshela	29	IF	October 11, 1991 (aged 33)	(United States) Oakland Athletics	Major League Baseball	(Colombia) Cartagena
Brayan Buelvas	12	OF	June 8, 2002 (aged 20)	(United States) Oakland Athletics (minors)	Major League Baseball	(Colombia) Cartagena
Dilson Herrera	3	OF	March 3, 1994 (aged 29)	(Mexico) Venados de Mazatlan	Mexican Pacific League	(Colombia) Cartagena
Jesús Marriaga	17	OF	December 17, 1998 (aged 26)	(Colombia) Caimanes de Barranquilla	Colombian Professional Baseball League	(Colombia) Cartagena
Óscar Mercado	35	OF	December 16, 1994 (aged 30)	(United States) Philadelphia Phillies (minors)	Major League Baseball	(Colombia) Cartagena
Harold Ramírez	43	OF	September 6, 1994 (aged 30)	(Mexico) (United States) Tecolotes de los Dos Laredos	Mexican League	(Colombia) Cartagena

=== Germany ===
Germany's full roster was announced on February 15, 2025.

Manager
(Germany) 14 Jendrick Speer
Coaches
31 Maurice Wilhelm (bench), 39 Alexander Baham (hitting), 32 Clemens Cichocki (pitching), 11 Mike Bolsenbroek (bullpen), 1 Octavio Medina (infield), 8 Maurice Biendrin (bullpen catcher)

Player	No.	Pos.	Date of birth (age)	Team	League	Birthplace
Jaden Agassi	25	P	October 1, 2001 (aged 23)	(United States) Mahoning Valley Scrappers	MLB Draft League	(United States) Las Vegas, Nevada
Joe Cedano de Leon	12	P	January 13, 2000 (aged 25)	(Germany) Regensburg Legionäre	Bundesliga	(Germany) Bad Homburg
Jake Gilbert	50	P	December 1, 1996 (aged 28)	(United States) Cincinnati Reds (minors)	Major League Baseball	(United States) Evans, Georgia
Marcel Giraud	37	P	September 29, 1999 (aged 25)	(Germany) Bonn Capitals	Bundesliga	(Germany) Karlsruhe
Simon Gross	17	P	December 1, 2001 (aged 23)	(Germany) Bonn Capitals	Bundesliga	(Germany) Berlin
Mark Harrison	28	P	October 18, 1999 (aged 25)	(Germany) Paderborn Untouchables	Bundesliga	(Germany) Paderborn
Sascha Koch	9	P	November 30, 1997 (aged 27)	(Germany) Bonn Capitals	Bundesliga	(Germany) Troisdorf
Jordan Martinson	23	P	March 7, 1997 (aged 27)	(United States) Kane County Cougars	American Association	(United States) Bedford, Texas
Christian Pedrol	24	P	June 15, 2000 (aged 24)	(Germany) Regensburg Legionäre	Bundesliga	(Brazil) São Paulo, São Paulo
Niklas Rimmel	41	P	July 5, 1999 (aged 25)	(Germany) Regensburg Legionäre	Bundesliga	(Germany) Berlin
Sven Schuller	34	P	January 17, 1996 (aged 29)	(Germany) Heidenheim Heideköpfe	Bundesliga	(Germany) Wuppertal
Markus Solbach	19	P	August 26, 1991 (aged 33)	(Germany) Bonn Capitals	Bundesliga	(Germany) Dormagen
Tommy Sommer	26	P	September 25, 1998 (aged 26)	(United States) Kane County Cougars	American Association	(United States) Carmel, Indiana
Duke von Schamann	29	P	June 3, 1991 (aged 33)	(Germany) Heidenheim Heideköpfe	Bundesliga	(United States) Tulsa, Oklahoma
Nick Wittgren	62	P	May 29, 1991 (aged 33)	(Dominican Republic) Aguilas Cibaenas	Dominican Professional Baseball League	(United States) Torrance, California
Vincent Ahrens	5	C	October 27, 1993 (aged 31)	(Germany) Cologne Cardinals	Bundesliga	(Germany) Cologne
Yannic Walther	15	C	April 12, 2004 (aged 20)	(United States) Milwaukee Brewers (minors)	Major League Baseball	(Germany) Heidelberg
Simon Baeumer	35	IF	January 16, 2002 (aged 23)	(Germany) Regensburg Legionäre	Bundesliga	(Germany) Hamburg
Simon Baumgart	3	IF	October 19, 2000 (aged 24)	(United States) Notre Dame Fighting Irish	NCAA	(United States) Washington, D.C.
Finn Bergman	33	IF	February 13, 2000 (aged 25)	(Germany) Paderborn Untouchables	Bundesliga	(Germany) Garmisch-Partenkirchen
Eric Brenk	30	IF	March 22, 1992 (aged 32)	(Germany) Bonn Capitals	Bundesliga	(United States) Long Beach, California
Tristan Russell	18	IF	October 19, 2000 (aged 24)	(United States) Houston Cougars	NCAA	(United States) Arlington, Texas
Alex Schmidt	6	IF	April 2, 1999 (aged 25)	(Germany) Regensburg Legionäre	Bundesliga	(Australia) Canberra
Lucas Dunn	10	OF	April 30, 1999 (aged 25)	(United States) San Diego Padres (minors)	Major League Baseball	(United States) Panama City, Florida
Lou Helmig	13	OF	May 1, 2003 (aged 21)	(Germany) Regensburg Legionäre	Bundesliga	(Germany) Paderborn
Shawn Larry	7	OF	September 2, 1991 (aged 33)	(Germany) Heidenheim Heideköpfe	Bundesliga	(Germany) Bad Windsheim
Donald Lutz	61	OF	September 2, 1991 (aged 33)	(Australia) Brisbane Bandits	Australian Baseball League	(United States) Watertown, New York
Luca Rammelman	27	OF	July 25, 2002 (aged 22)	(Germany) Paderborn Untouchables	Bundesliga	(Germany) Hamm
