= Lee Ji-young (baseball) =

South Korean baseball player (born 1986)

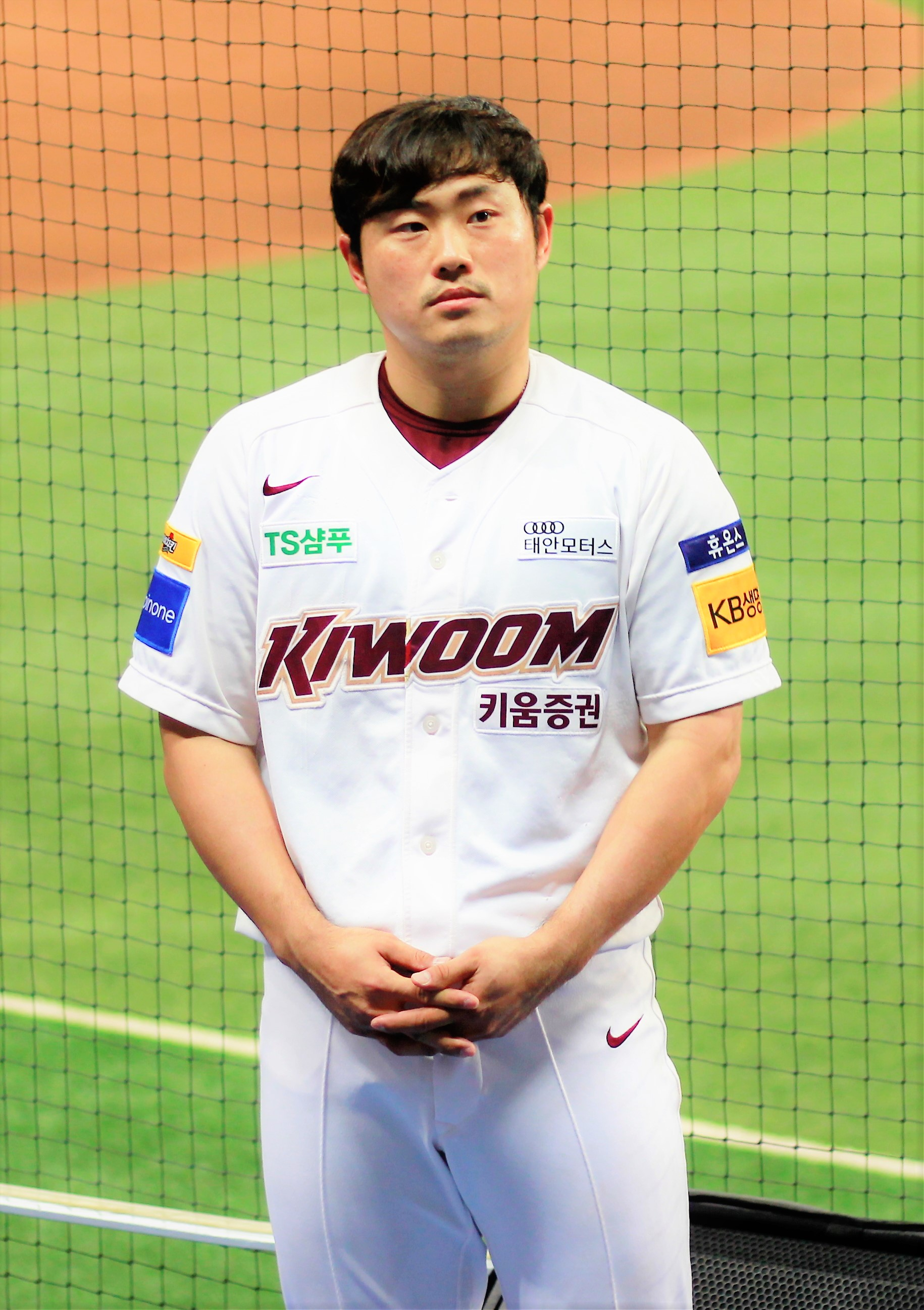

SSG Landers – No. 59
- Catcher
- Born: February 27, 1986 (age 40)
- Bats: Right Throws: Right

KBO debut
- June 18, 2009, for the Samsung Lions

KBO statistics (through 2025)
- Batting average: .278
- Home runs: 24
- Runs batted in: 436
- Stats at Baseball Reference

Teams
- Samsung Lions (2009, 2012–2018); Kiwoom Heroes (2019–2023); SSG Landers (2024–present)

Lee Ji-young (Korean: 이지영; Hanja: 李知栄; born February 27, 1986, in Incheon) is a South Korean catcher for the SSG Landers of the KBO League. He bats and throws right-handed.

== Amateur career ==
After graduating from Jemulpo High School in Incheon, Lee entered Kyungsung University in Busan. As a sophomore in 2005, Lee led his team to the collegiate championship twice (National Championship and Fall League Championship) alongside battery mate Jang Won-Sam. In August 2005, Lee was first called up to the South Korea national baseball team as an amateur player and participated in the Baseball World Cup held in the Netherlands where Team Korea eventually won the silver medal. At the World Cup, he appeared as a starting catcher in the preliminary game against Sweden.

As a senior in 2007, Lee helped the team to win two collegiate championships (Fall League Championship and President's Flag Championship) as a captain and starting catcher of the team.

=== Notable international careers ===
Year	Venue	Competition	Team	Individual note
2005	Netherlands	Baseball World Cup	Silver medal	.000 BA (0-for-3)

== Professional career ==
After graduation from college, Lee went undrafted in the 2008 KBO Entry Draft and signed as an original free agent with the Samsung Lions. He played no games his first year but made a positive impact next season, playing in 23 games as a backup catcher and driving in 4 runs out of 6 hits.

Lee joined the two-year military service after the 2009 season and was discharged in September 2011. In October 2011, Lee was selected for the South Korean national baseball team for the 2011 Baseball World Cup. In the tourney, he batted .289 with 13 hits including a solo home run off of Eliecer Navarro of Panama appearing in all 12 games as a fixture at first base for Team Korea.

On December 7, 2018, he moved through a triangular trade between Kim Dong-yup, who was a member of the SK Wyverns, and Ko Jong-wook, who was a member of the Nexen Heroes.

=== Notable international careers ===
Year	Venue	Competition	Team	Individual note
2010	Chinese Taipei	Intercontinental Cup	6th	.421 (8-for-19), 1 HR, 5 RBI, 3 R
2011	Panama	Baseball World Cup	6th	.289 (13-for-45), 1 HR, 5 RBI, 3 R

== Filmography ==
=== Television show ===
Year	Title	Role	Notes	Ref.
2023	Golf Match Swing Star	Contestant		
