= Damiano Palmegiani =

Venezuelan baseball player (born 2000)

Lexington Legends
- Third baseman / First baseman
- Born: January 24, 2000 (age 26); Caracas, Venezuela
- Bats: Right Throws: Right

Damiano Palmegiani (born January 24, 2000) is a Venezuelan-Canadian professional baseball infielder for the Lexington Legends of the Atlantic League of Professional Baseball. He has played for the Canada national baseball team.

== Early life ==
Palmegiani was born in Caracas, Venezuela and moved with his family to Surrey, British Columbia, Canada, when he was six.

== Professional career ==
=== Toronto Blue Jays ===
Palmegiani was selected by the Toronto Blue Jays in the 35th round of the 2018 Major League Baseball draft out of Vauxhall High School. He did not sign with the Blue Jays and played college baseball at California State University, Northridge before transferring to the College of Southern Nevada. He was then selected by the Blue Jays in the 14th round of the 2021 Major League Baseball draft, and signed.

Palmegiani made his professional debut with the Rookie-level Florida Complex League Blue Jays, appearing in 17 games and batting .333 with two home runs and nine runs batted in (RBI). He spent 2022 with the Low-A Dunedin Blue Jays and High-A Vancouver Canadians. In a combined 119 games, Palmegiani hit .239 with 24 home runs and 83 RBI. He continued to progress through the Blue Jays' minor league organization in 2023, beginning the season with the Double-A New Hampshire Fisher Cats before earning a late-season promotion to the Triple-A Buffalo Bisons. In 128 total games, Palmegiani hit .255 with 23 home runs and 93 RBI. During the offseason, he played in 22 games for the Surprise Saguaros of the Arizona Fall League (AFL).

Palmegiani made 123 appearances for Triple-A Buffalo during the 2024 campaign, slashing .210/.311/.381 with 19 home runs and 69 RBI. In 2025, he made 64 appearances split between Buffalo, New Hampshire, and Dunedin, batting a cumulative .159/.306/.233 with one home run and 18 RBI. Palmegiani was released by the Blue Jays organization on March 17, 2026.

=== Lexington Legends ===
On June 16, 2026, Palmegiani signed with the Lexington Legends of the Atlantic League of Professional Baseball.

== International career ==
In 2023, he was selected to play for the Canadian national baseball team in the 2023 World Baseball Classic.
