= Lorenzo Quintana =

Cuban baseball player (born 1989)

Free agent
- Catcher / First baseman
- Born: March 1, 1989 (age 37); Pinar del Río, Cuba
- Bats: Right Throws: Right

Lorenzo Quintana Fernández (born March 1, 1989) is a Cuban professional baseball catcher and first baseman who is a free agent. He is a member of the Cuban national baseball team in the 2023 World Baseball Classic.

== Career ==
Quintana played in the Cuban National Series from 2008 to 2015 with Pinar del Río.

=== Houston Astros ===
On October 4, 2017, Quintana signed with the Houston Astros as an international free agent. He made his organizational debut in 2018 with the Double-A Corpus Christi Hooks, appearing in 70 games and hitting .254/.316/.484 with 11 home runs and 42 RBI. The next year, Quintana played in 76 games split between Corpus Christi and the Triple-A Round Rock Express, slashing .299/.342/.547 with 17 home runs and 56 RBI.

Quintana did not play in a game in 2020 due to the cancellation of the minor league season because of the COVID-19 pandemic. In 2021, he played in 28 games for the Triple-A Sugar Land Skeeters, hitting .311/.372/.340 with no home runs and 4 RBI.

=== Miami Marlins ===
On June 13, 2021, Quintana was traded to the Miami Marlins. He finished out the year playing in 64 games for the Triple-A Jacksonville Jumbo Shrimp, hitting .294/.354/.525 with 9 home runs and 34 RBI.

In 2022, Quintana played in 60 games for Triple-A Jacksonville, batting .246/.306/.479 with 14 home runs and 54 RBI. He was released by the Marlins organization on August 3, 2022.
