= China National Baseball League =

Former men's baseball league in China

China National Baseball League (CNBL)
- Sport: Baseball
- Founded: 2019
- Folded: n.t.l. 2023
- No. of teams: 4
- Country: China
- Continent: Asia
- Most titles: Beijing Tigers (1)
- Level on pyramid: Professional

The China National Baseball League (Chinese: 中国棒球职业联赛, CNBL) was a short-lived professional baseball league in mainland China which represented the highest level of professional baseball in the nation between the 2019 and 2023 seasons. Created as a replacement/rebranding of the China Baseball League (CBL); the CNBL only ever played their inaugural 2019 season as the following seasons were cancelled due to restrictions related to the COVID-19 pandemic in mainland China. Upon the lifting of restrictions in 2023; the CBL was revived, replacing the CNBL.

== History ==
Following the folding of its predecessor, China Baseball League (CBL), after the 2018 season, the CNBL was launched to represent the highest level of professional baseball in the nation for the 2019 season; with its inaugural game being played on 15 August. The season's league was ultimately won by the Beijing Tigers. After this inaugural season, the CNBL was forced to take a three-year pause due to restrictions related to the COVID-19 pandemic in mainland China, only being allowed to practice and hold scrimmages. As a result, many players from the CNBL only played their first professional game again in the 2023 World Baseball Classic, where China lost all four consecutive matches in their pool before being eliminated.

Even though the CNBL was reportedly ready to relaunch for the 2023 season, it is both unclear and unlikely the CNBL still existed by the time the 2023 World Baseball Classic took place. A restructuring of professional baseball in the nation took place in 2021, and during the 2023 World Baseball Classic, Chinese players were represented by the parenting Chinese Baseball Association because a professional system was reportedly not in operation. Regardless, the 2023 season was ultimately played by a revived CBL, the league the CNBL had once replaced. As of 2026, another professional league named the Chinese Professional Baseball (CPB), started the same year, now co-exists with the CBL as the main professional league in the nation.

== Teams ==
The league launched in 2019 with the following four teams.

Team	City	Province	Stadium	Capacity	Joined
Beijing Tigers	Beijing	–	Lucheng Field	5,000	2019
Guangdong Leopards	Zhongshan	Guangdong	Zhongshan Sports Center Stadium	12,000	2019
Jiangsu Huge Horses	Wuxi	Jiangsu	Wuxi Baseball Stadium	3,000	2019
Tianjin Lions	Tianjin	–	Tian Ti Dodger Stadium	2,000	2019
