= 2017 World Baseball Classic rosters =

2017 World Baseball Classic

The 2017 World Baseball Classic (WBC) was an international professional baseball competition in which sixteen nations competed.

== Key ==
Pos.	Position
P	Pitcher
C	Catcher
IF	Infielder
OF	Outfielder

== Pool A ==
=== South Korea ===
Manager
(South Korea) Kim In-sik
Coaches
Lee Soon-chul, Sun Dong-yol, Song Jin-woo, Kim Pyoung-ho, Kim Kwang-soo, Song Kwon-il

Player	No.	Pos.	DOB and age	Team	League	Birthplace
Jang Si-hwan	28	P	1 November 1987 (aged 29)	(South Korea) KT Wiz	KBO League	(South Korea) Taean County
Chang Won-jun	29	P	31 July 1985 (aged 31)	(South Korea) Doosan Bears	KBO League	(South Korea) Seoul
Lee Hyun-seung	48	P	11 October 1983 (aged 33)	(South Korea) Doosan Bears	KBO League	(South Korea) Incheon
Lim Chang-yong	12	P	4 June 1976 (aged 40)	(South Korea) Kia Tigers	KBO League	(South Korea) Gwangju
Lim Jung-woo	20	P	2 April 1991 (aged 25)	(South Korea) LG Twins	KBO League	(South Korea) Iksan
Oh Seung-hwan	26	P	15 July 1982 (aged 34)	(United States) St. Louis Cardinals	Major League Baseball	(South Korea) Jeongeup
Park Hee-soo	21	P	13 July 1983 (aged 33)	(South Korea) SK Wyverns	KBO League	(South Korea) Daejeon
Rhee Dae-eun	11	P	23 March 1989 (aged 27)	(South Korea) Korean Police Baseball Team	KBO Futures League	(South Korea) Seoul
Sim Chang-min	19	P	1 February 1993 (aged 24)	(South Korea) Samsung Lions	KBO League	(South Korea) Seoul
Won Jong-hyun	46	P	31 July 1987 (aged 29)	(South Korea) NC Dinos	KBO League	(South Korea) Gunsan
Woo Kyu-min	1	P	21 January 1985 (aged 32)	(South Korea) Samsung Lions	KBO League	(South Korea) Seoul
Yang Hyeon-jong	54	P	1 March 1988 (aged 29)	(South Korea) Kia Tigers	KBO League	(South Korea) Gwangju
Kim Tae-gun	42	C	30 December 1989 (aged 27)	(South Korea) NC Dinos	KBO League	(South Korea) Busan
Yang Eui-ji	25	C	5 June 1987 (aged 29)	(South Korea) Doosan Bears	KBO League	(South Korea) Gwangju
Hur Kyoung-min	13	IF	26 August 1990 (aged 26)	(South Korea) Doosan Bears	KBO League	(South Korea) Gwangju
Kim Ha-seong	7	IF	17 October 1995 (aged 21)	(South Korea) Nexen Heroes	KBO League	(South Korea) Bucheon
Kim Jae-ho	3	IF	21 March 1985 (aged 31)	(South Korea) Doosan Bears	KBO League	(South Korea) Seoul
Kim Tae-kyun	52	IF	29 May 1982 (aged 34)	(South Korea) Hanwha Eagles	KBO League	(South Korea) Cheonan
Lee Dae-ho	10	IF	21 June 1982 (aged 34)	(South Korea) Lotte Giants	KBO League	(South Korea) Busan
Oh Jae-won	24	IF	9 February 1985 (aged 32)	(South Korea) Doosan Bears	KBO League	(South Korea) Seoul
Park Sok-min	18	IF	22 June 1985 (aged 31)	(South Korea) NC Dinos	KBO League	(South Korea) Daegu
Seo Geon-chang	14	IF	24 February 1988 (aged 29)	(South Korea) Nexen Heroes	KBO League	(South Korea) Gwangju
Choi Hyoung-woo	34	OF	16 December 1983 (aged 33)	(South Korea) Kia Tigers	KBO League	(South Korea) Jeonju
Lee Yong-kyu	15	OF	26 August 1985 (aged 31)	(South Korea) Hanwha Eagles	KBO League	(South Korea) Gunsan
Min Byung-hun	49	OF	10 March 1987 (aged 29)	(South Korea) Doosan Bears	KBO League	(South Korea) Seoul
Park Kun-woo	37	OF	8 September 1990 (aged 26)	(South Korea) Doosan Bears	KBO League	(South Korea) Seoul
Son Ah-seop	31	OF	18 March 1988 (aged 28)	(South Korea) Lotte Giants	KBO League	(South Korea) Busan

=== Chinese Taipei ===
Manager
(Chinese Taipei) (88) Kuo Tai-yuan
Coaches
(5) Wu Fu-lian, (12) Huang Chin-chih, (27) Yeh Chun-chang, (52) Chen Chin-feng, (79) Lee An-hsi, (87) Chen Lien-hung, (91) Chiang Yi-chang

Player	No.	Pos.	DOB and age	Team	League	Birthplace
Chen Hung-wen	17	P	3 February 1986 (aged 31)	(Taiwan) Chinatrust Brothers	Chinese Professional Baseball	(Taiwan) Hualien County
Chen Kuan-yu	47	P	29 October 1990 (aged 26)	(Japan) Chiba Lotte Marines	Nippon Professional Baseball	(Taiwan) New Taipei City
Chen Ping-hsueh**	33	P	8 July 1994 (aged 22)	(United States) Cleveland Indians (minors)	Minor League Baseball	(Taiwan) Taipei
Chen Yun-wen*	34	P	28 November 1995 (aged 21)	(Taiwan) Uni-President 7-Eleven Lions	Chinese Professional Baseball	(Taiwan) Pingtung County
Chiang Shao-ching	30	P	10 November 1993 (aged 23)	(United States) Cleveland Indians (minors)	Minor League Baseball	(Taiwan) Hualien County
Huang Sheng-hsiung	56	P	3 December 1990 (aged 26)	(Taiwan) Fubon Guardians	Chinese Professional Baseball	(Taiwan) Taitung County
Kuo Chun-lin	75	P	2 February 1992 (aged 25)	(Japan) Saitama Seibu Lions	Nippon Professional Baseball	(Taiwan) Hsinchu
Lai Hung-cheng**	48	P	26 April 1988 (aged 28)	(Taiwan) Fubon Guardians	Chinese Professional Baseball	(Taiwan) Taoyuan
Lin Chen-hua	16	P	16 December 1988 (aged 28)	(Taiwan) Fubon Guardians	Chinese Professional Baseball	(Taiwan) Kaohsiung
Lo Ko-hua*	37	P	28 October 1992 (aged 24)	(Japan) Kōchi Fighting Dogs	Shikoku Island League Plus	(Taiwan) Chiayi
Lu Yen-ching**	21	P	10 March 1996 (aged 20)			
Ni Fu-te	36	P	14 November 1982 (aged 34)	(Taiwan) Fubon Guardians	Chinese Professional Baseball	(Taiwan) Pingtung County
Pan Wei-lun	18	P	5 March 1982 (aged 35)	(Taiwan) Uni-President 7-Eleven Lions	Chinese Professional Baseball	(Taiwan) Pingtung County
Sung Chia-hao	43	P	6 September 1992 (aged 24)	(Japan) Tohoku Rakuten Golden Eagles (farm)	Eastern League	(Taiwan) Taitung County
Tsai Ming-chin	19	P	28 September 1984 (aged 32)	(Taiwan) Fubon Guardians	Chinese Professional Baseball	(Taiwan) Tainan
Wang Cheng-hao**	70	P	25 September 1989 (aged 27)	(Taiwan) Taitung Chii Lih Coral		(Taiwan) Taitung County
Wang Chien-ming**	40	P	31 March 1980 (aged 36)			(Taiwan) Tainan
Wang Ching-ming	41	P	16 January 1986 (aged 31)	(Taiwan) Uni-President 7-Eleven Lions	Chinese Professional Baseball	(Taiwan) Taitung County
Wang Wei-chung**	22	P	25 April 1992 (aged 24)	(United States) Milwaukee Brewers (minors)	Minor League Baseball	(Taiwan) Taitung County
Wu Chun-chieh**	71	P	7 November 1996 (aged 20)			
Yang Chien-fu**	46	P	22 April 1979 (aged 37)	(Taiwan) Uni-President 7-Eleven Lions	Chinese Professional Baseball	(Taiwan) Taitung County
Cheng Da-hung	77	C	12 January 1981 (aged 36)	(Taiwan) Chinatrust Brothers	Chinese Professional Baseball	(Taiwan) Taitung County
Lin Kun-sheng	20	C	8 March 1987 (aged 29)	(Taiwan) Fubon Guardians	Chinese Professional Baseball	(Taiwan) Taichung County
Chen Yung-chi	13	IF	13 July 1983 (aged 33)	(Taiwan) Uni-President 7-Eleven Lions	Chinese Professional Baseball	(Taiwan) Taitung County
Chiang Chih-hsien	11	IF	21 February 1988 (aged 29)	(Taiwan) Chinatrust Brothers	Chinese Professional Baseball	(Taiwan) Taitung County
Hsu Chi-hung	74	IF	22 July 1992 (aged 24)	(Taiwan) Chinatrust Brothers	Chinese Professional Baseball	(Taiwan) Kaohsiung County
Lin Chih-hsiang	69	IF	8 March 1987 (aged 29)	(Taiwan) Uni-President 7-Eleven Lions	Chinese Professional Baseball	(Taiwan) Taitung County
Lin Chih-sheng	1	IF	1 January 1982 (aged 35)	(Taiwan) Chinatrust Brothers	Chinese Professional Baseball	(Taiwan) Taitung County
Lin Yi-chuan	9	IF	11 November 1985 (aged 31)	(Taiwan) Fubon Guardians	Chinese Professional Baseball	(Taiwan) Tainan
Wang Sheng-wei	14	IF	1 April 1984 (aged 32)	(Taiwan) Chinatrust Brothers	Chinese Professional Baseball	(Taiwan) Taitung County
Chang Cheng-wei	59	OF	5 August 1986 (aged 30)	(Taiwan) Chinatrust Brothers	Chinese Professional Baseball	(Taiwan) Taitung County
Chang Chih-hao	7	OF	15 May 1987 (aged 29)	(Taiwan) Chinatrust Brothers	Chinese Professional Baseball	(Taiwan) Taitung County
Hu Chin-lung	15	OF	2 February 1984 (aged 33)	(Taiwan) Fubon Guardians	Chinese Professional Baseball	(Taiwan) Tainan
Kao Kuo-hui	28	OF	26 September 1985 (aged 31)	(Taiwan) Fubon Guardians	Chinese Professional Baseball	(Taiwan) Hualien County
Lin Che-hsuan	24	OF	21 September 1988 (aged 28)	(Taiwan) Fubon Guardians	Chinese Professional Baseball	(Taiwan) Hualien County
Luo Kuo-long	8	OF	24 June 1989 (aged 27)	(Taiwan) Uni-President 7-Eleven Lions	Chinese Professional Baseball	(Taiwan) Hualien County

=== Netherlands ===
Manager
(Netherlands) Hensley Meulens
Coaches
Hitting Coach (24) Sidney de Jong, Pitching Coach (28) Bert Blyleven, First Base Coach (34) Wim Martinus, Third Base Coach (44) Ben Thijssen, Bench Coach (25) Andruw Jones, Bullpen Coach (15) Steve Janssen, Bullpen Catcher (66) Chadwick Tromp

Player	No.	Pos.	DOB and age	Team	League	Birthplace
Nelmerson Xavier Angela**	9	P	20 February 1998 (aged 19)	(United States) New York Mets (minors)	Minor League Baseball	Willemstad, Curaçao
Mike Bolsenbroek*	20	P	11 March 1987 (aged 29)	(Germany) Buchbinder Legionäre	Bundesliga	Apeldoorn, Netherlands
Rob Cordemans	19	P	31 October 1974 (aged 42)	(Netherlands) Amsterdam Pirates	Honkbal Hoofdklasse	Schiedam, Netherlands
Tom de Blok	53	P	8 May 1996 (aged 20)	(Netherlands) Amsterdam Pirates	Honkbal Hoofdklasse	Amstelveen, Netherlands
Kevin Heijstek**	13	P	19 April 1988 (aged 28)	(Netherlands) Amsterdam Pirates	Honkbal Hoofdklasse	Dordrecht, Netherlands
Lars Huijer	29	P	22 September 1993 (aged 23)	(Netherlands) Vaeseen Pioniers	Honkbal Hoofdklasse	Haarlem, Netherlands
Kenley Jansen*	74	P	30 September 1987 (aged 29)	(United States) Los Angeles Dodgers	Major League Baseball	Willemstad, Curaçao
Jair Jurrjens	49	P	29 January 1986 (aged 31)			Willemstad, Curaçao
Kevin Kelly**	33	P	27 May 1990 (aged 26)	(Netherlands) Curaçao Neptunus	Honkbal Hoofdklasse	Willemstad, Curaçao
Ruderly Manuel**	48	P	26 August 1990 (aged 26)			Willemstad, Curaçao
Diego Markwell	36	P	8 August 1980 (aged 36)	(Netherlands) Curaçao Neptunus	Honkbal Hoofdklasse	Willemstad, Curaçao
Shairon Martis	39	P	30 March 1987 (aged 29)	(Venezuela) Aguilas de Zulia	Liga Venezolana de Béisbol Profesional	Willemstad, Curaçao
Ryan Oduber**	60	P	16 August 1997 (aged 19)	(United States) Boston Red Sox (minors)	Minor League Baseball	Oranjestad, Aruba
Mark Pawelek**	38	P	18 August 1986 (aged 30)			Springville, United States
Jim Ploeger	50	P	21 June 1991 (aged 25)	(Netherlands) HCAW	Honkbal Hoofdklasse	Almere, Netherlands
Tom Stuifbergen	26	P	26 September 1988 (aged 28)	(Netherlands) Corendon Kinheim	Honkbal Hoofdklasse	Breda, Netherlands
J. C. Sulbaran	45	P	9 November 1989 (aged 27)	(United States) St. Louis Cardinals (minors)	Minor League Baseball	Willemstad, Curaçao
Rick van den Hurk	44	P	22 May 1985 (aged 31)	(Japan) Fukuoka SoftBank Hawks	Nippon Professional Baseball	Eindhoven, Netherlands
Berry van Driel**	3	P	26 December 1984 (aged 32)	(Netherlands) Curaçao Neptunus	Honkbal Hoofdklasse	The Hague, Netherlands
Loek van Mil	46	P	15 September 1984 (aged 32)	(Netherlands) Curaçao Neptunus	Honkbal Hoofdklasse	Oss, Netherlands
Orlando Yntema*	40	P	21 February 1986 (aged 31)	(Netherlands) Curaçao Neptunus	Honkbal Hoofdklasse	Puerto Plata, Dominican Republic
Dashenko Ricardo	21	C	1 March 1990 (aged 27)	(Netherlands) Curaçao Neptunus	Honkbal Hoofdklasse	Willemstad, Curaçao
Shawn Zarraga	37	C	21 January 1989 (aged 28)	(United States) Cincinnati Reds (minors)	Minor League Baseball	Madiki, Aruba
Xander Bogaerts	1	IF	1 October 1992 (aged 24)	(United States) Boston Red Sox	Major League Baseball	San Nicolas, Aruba
Yurendell DeCaster	7	IF	26 September 1979 (aged 37)	(Nicaragua) Tigres del Chinandega	Liga Nicaragüense de Béisbol	Brievengat, Curaçao
Didi Gregorius	18	IF	18 February 1990 (aged 27)	(United States) New York Yankees	Major League Baseball	Amsterdam, Netherlands
Dwayne Kemp	12	IF	24 February 1988 (aged 29)	(Netherlands) Curaçao Neptunus	Honkbal Hoofdklasse	Rotterdam, Netherlands
Jurickson Profar	10	IF	20 February 1993 (aged 24)	(United States) Texas Rangers	Major League Baseball	Willemstad, Curaçao
Jonathan Schoop	6	IF	16 October 1991 (aged 25)	(United States) Baltimore Orioles	Major League Baseball	Willemstad, Curaçao
Sharlon Schoop	15	IF	15 April 1987 (aged 29)	(United States) Baltimore Orioles (minors)	Minor League Baseball	Willemstad, Curaçao
Andrelton Simmons	2	IF	4 September 1989 (aged 27)	(United States) Los Angeles Angels	Major League Baseball	Willemstad, Curaçao
Curt Smith	30	IF	9 September 1986 (aged 30)	(United States) Lincoln Saltdogs	American Association	Willemstad, Curaçao
Stijn van der Meer	27	IF	1 May 1993 (aged 23)	(United States) Houston Astros (minors)	Minor League Baseball	Rosmalen, Netherlands
Wladimir Balentien	4	OF	2 July 1984 (aged 32)	(Japan) Tokyo Yakult Swallows	Nippon Professional Baseball	Willemstad, Curaçao
Randolph Oduber	14	OF	15 March 1989 (aged 27)	(Netherlands) Curaçao Neptunus	Honkbal Hoofdklasse	Paradera, Aruba
Kalian Sams	35	OF	25 August 1986 (aged 30)	(Canada) Québec Capitales	Can-Am League	The Hague, Netherlands

=== Israel ===
Manager
(United States) Jerry Weinstein
Coaches
Tom Gamboa, Andrew Lorraine, Alon Leichman, Pat Doyle, Nate Fish

Player	No.	Pos.	DOB and age	Team	League	Birthplace
Dylan Axelrod	19	P	30 July 1985 (aged 31)			Santa Barbara, United States
Corey Baker	38	P	23 November 1989 (aged 27)	(United States) St. Louis Cardinals (minors)	Minor League Baseball	New York City, United States
Jeremy Bleich	27	P	18 June 1987 (aged 29)	(United States) Arizona Diamondbacks (minors)	Minor League Baseball	Metairie, United States
Richard Bleier**	54	P	16 April 1987 (aged 29)	(United States) Baltimore Orioles	Major League Baseball	Davie, United States
Craig Breslow**	32	P	8 August 1980 (aged 36)	(United States) Minnesota Twins (minors)	Minor League Baseball	New Haven, United States
Danny Burawa	41	P	30 December 1988 (aged 28)	(United States) Long Island Ducks	Atlantic League	Rocky Point, United States
Gabe Cramer	11	P	1 November 1994 (aged 22)	(United States) Kansas City Royals (minors)	Minor League Baseball	Santa Rosa, United States
Scott Feldman**	47	P	7 February 1983 (aged 34)	(United States) Cincinnati Reds	Major League Baseball	Kailua, United States
Jake Fishman**	39	P	8 February 1995 (aged 22)	(Canada) Toronto Blue Jays (minors)	Minor League Baseball	Newton, United States
Brad Goldberg**	24	P	21 February 1991 (aged 26)	(United States) Chicago White Sox	Major League Baseball	Cleveland, United States
Tyler Herron	33	P	5 August 1986 (aged 30)	(United States) Lincoln Saltdogs	American Association	West Palm Beach, United States
Jake Kalish	35	P	9 July 1991 (aged 25)	(United States) Kansas City Royals (minors)	Minor League Baseball	Red Bank, United States
Alex Katz	25	P	12 October 1994 (aged 22)	(United States) Chicago White Sox (minors)	Minor League Baseball	Manhasset, United States
Kenny Koplove**	4	P	2 August 1992 (aged 24)	(United States) Philadelphia Phillies (minors)	Minor League Baseball	Philadelphia, United States
Dean Kremer	17	P	7 January 1996 (aged 21)	(United States) Los Angeles Dodgers (minors)	Minor League Baseball	Stockton, United States
Jared Lakind**	26	P	9 March 1992 (aged 24)	(United States) Pittsburgh Pirates (minors)	Minor League Baseball	Cypress, United States
Shlomo Lipetz*	12	P	11 February 1979 (aged 38)			(Israel) Tel Aviv
Jason Marquis	21	P	21 August 1978 (aged 38)			Manhasset, United States
Troy Neiman	44	P	13 November 1990 (aged 26)	(United States) Colorado Rockies (minors)	Minor League Baseball	Castaic, United States
R. C. Orlan	16	P	28 September 1990 (aged 26)	(United States) Cleveland Indians (minors)	Minor League Baseball	Glen Allen, United States
Ryan Sherriff**	72	P	25 May 1990 (aged 26)	(United States) St. Louis Cardinals (minors)	Minor League Baseball	Culver City, United States
Zack Thornton*	46	P	19 May 1988 (aged 28)			Los Angeles, United States
Joey Wagman*	6	P	25 July 1991 (aged 25)	(United States) Oakland Athletics (minors)	Minor League Baseball	Walnut Creek, United States
Josh Zeid	28	P	24 March 1987 (aged 29)			New Haven, United States
Ryan Lavarnway	36	C	7 August 1987 (aged 29)	(United States) Oakland Athletics (minors)	Minor League Baseball	Burbank, United States
Nick Rickles	9	C	2 February 1990 (aged 27)	(United States) Washington Nationals (minors)	Minor League Baseball	Fort Lauderdale, United States
Scott Burcham	5	IF	17 June 1993 (aged 23)	(United States) Colorado Rockies (minors)	Minor League Baseball	La Quinta, United States
Ike Davis	29	IF	22 March 1987 (aged 29)	(United States) Los Angeles Dodgers (minors)	Minor League Baseball	Edina, United States
Cody Decker	14	IF	17 January 1987 (aged 30)	(United States) Milwaukee Brewers (minors)	Minor League Baseball	Santa Monica, United States
Nate Freiman	45	IF	31 December 1986 (aged 30)			Washington, D.C., United States
Ty Kelly	56	IF	20 July 1988 (aged 28)	(United States) New York Mets	Major League Baseball	Dallas, United States
Tyler Krieger	22	IF	16 January 1994 (aged 23)	(United States) Cleveland Indians (minors)	Minor League Baseball	Laguna Hills, United States
Zach Borenstein	18	OF	23 July 1990 (aged 26)	(United States) Arizona Diamondbacks (minors)	Minor League Baseball	Buffalo Grove, United States
Sam Fuld	23	OF	19 September 1984 (aged 32)			Durham, United States
Blake Gailen	13	OF	27 March 1985 (aged 31)	(United States) Lancaster Barnstormers	Atlantic League	Verdugo Hills, United States
Mike Meyers	7	OF	28 December 1993 (aged 23)	(United States) Boston Red Sox (minors)	Minor League Baseball	Las Vegas, United States

== Pool B ==
=== Japan ===
Manager
(Japan) (90) Hiroki Kokubo
Coaches
(72) Hiroshi Gondoh, (73) Hiroshi Narahara, (79) Takayuki Ohnishi, (87) Toshihisa Nishi, (80) Atsunori Inaba, (84) Yoshinori Murata

Player	No.	Pos.	DOB and age	Team	League	Birthplace
Ryo Akiyoshi	12	P	21 March 1989 (aged 27)	(Japan) Tokyo Yakult Swallows	Nippon Professional Baseball	(Japan) Adachi, Tokyo
Shintaro Fujinami	17	P	12 April 1994 (aged 22)	(Japan) Hanshin Tigers	Nippon Professional Baseball	(Japan) Sakai, Osaka
Yoshihisa Hirano*	66	P	8 March 1984 (aged 32)	(Japan) Orix Buffaloes	Nippon Professional Baseball	(Japan) Uji, Kyoto
Kenta Ishida**	26	P	1 March 1993 (aged 24)	(Japan) Yokohama DeNA BayStars	Nippon Professional Baseball	(Japan) Minami-ku, Hiroshima
Ayumu Ishikawa	20	P	4 November 1988 (aged 28)	(Japan) Chiba Lotte Marines	Nippon Professional Baseball	(Japan) Uozu, Toyama
Yuta Iwasada**	47	P	5 September 1991 (aged 25)	(Japan) Hanshin Tigers	Nippon Professional Baseball	(Japan) Higashi-ku, Kumamoto
Kazuhisa Makita	35	P	10 November 1984 (aged 32)	(Japan) Saitama Seibu Lions	Nippon Professional Baseball	(Japan) Yaizu, Shizuoka
Tatsushi Masuda**	48	P	23 April 1988 (aged 28)	(Japan) Saitama Seibu Lions	Nippon Professional Baseball	(Japan) Sumoto, Hyōgo
Hirotoshi Masui	19	P	26 June 1984 (aged 32)	(Japan) Hokkaido Nippon-Ham Fighters	Nippon Professional Baseball	(Japan) Yaizu, Shizuoka
Yuki Matsui	10	P	30 October 1995 (aged 21)	(Japan) Tohoku Rakuten Golden Eagles	Nippon Professional Baseball	(Japan) Aoba-ku, Yokohama
Naoki Miyanishi	15	P	2 June 1985 (aged 31)	(Japan) Hokkaido Nippon-Ham Fighters	Nippon Professional Baseball	(Japan) Nishinomiya, Hyōgo
Masahiko Morifuku**	21	P	29 July 1986 (aged 30)	(Japan) Fukuoka SoftBank Hawks	Nippon Professional Baseball	(Japan) Toyohashi, Aichi
Yusuke Nomura**	28	P	24 June 1989 (aged 27)	(Japan) Hiroshima Toyo Carp	Nippon Professional Baseball	(Japan) Kurashiki, Okayama
Takahiro Norimoto	14	P	17 December 1990 (aged 26)	(Japan) Tohoku Rakuten Golden Eagles	Nippon Professional Baseball	(Japan) Taga, Shiga
Daichi Ohsera**	29	P	17 June 1991 (aged 25)	(Japan) Hiroshima Toyo Carp	Nippon Professional Baseball	(Japan) Ōmura, Nagasaki
Toshiya Okada	34	P	5 December 1991 (aged 25)	(Japan) Chunichi Dragons	Nippon Professional Baseball	(Japan) Mihama, Wakayama
Hirokazu Sawamura**	18	P	3 April 1988 (aged 28)	(Japan) Yomiuri Giants	Nippon Professional Baseball	(Japan) Tochigi, Tochigi
Kodai Senga	41	P	30 January 1993 (aged 24)	(Japan) Fukuoka SoftBank Hawks	Nippon Professional Baseball	(Japan) Gamagōri, Aichi
Tomoyuki Sugano	11	P	11 October 1989 (aged 27)	(Japan) Yomiuri Giants	Nippon Professional Baseball	(Japan) Sagamihara, Kanagawa
Shota Takeda	30	P	3 April 1993 (aged 23)	(Japan) Fukuoka SoftBank Hawks	Nippon Professional Baseball	(Japan) Miyazaki, Miyazaki
Yasuaki Yamasaki**	24	P	2 October 1992 (aged 24)	(Japan) Yokohama DeNA BayStars	Nippon Professional Baseball	(Japan) Arakawa, Tokyo
Seiji Kobayashi	22	C	7 June 1989 (aged 27)	(Japan) Yomiuri Giants	Nippon Professional Baseball	(Japan) Sakai, Osaka
Shota Ohno	27	C	13 January 1987 (aged 30)	(Japan) Hokkaido Nippon-Ham Fighters	Nippon Professional Baseball	(Japan) Ōgaki, Gifu
Motohiro Shima	37	C	13 December 1984 (aged 32)	(Japan) Tohoku Rakuten Golden Eagles	Nippon Professional Baseball	(Japan) Kaizu, Gifu
Ryosuke Kikuchi	4	IF	11 March 1990 (aged 26)	(Japan) Hiroshima Toyo Carp	Nippon Professional Baseball	(Japan) Higashiyamato, Tokyo
Nobuhiro Matsuda	3	IF	17 May 1983 (aged 33)	(Japan) Fukuoka SoftBank Hawks	Nippon Professional Baseball	(Japan) Kusatsu, Shiga
Sho Nakata	13	IF	22 April 1989 (aged 27)	(Japan) Hokkaido Nippon-Ham Fighters	Nippon Professional Baseball	(Japan) Naka-ku, Hiroshima
Hayato Sakamoto	6	IF	14 December 1988 (aged 28)	(Japan) Yomiuri Giants	Nippon Professional Baseball	(Japan) Itami, Hyōgo
Kosuke Tanaka	2	IF	3 July 1989 (aged 27)	(Japan) Hiroshima Toyo Carp	Nippon Professional Baseball	(Japan) Atsugi, Kanagawa
Tetsuto Yamada	23	IF	16 July 1992 (aged 24)	(Japan) Tokyo Yakult Swallows	Nippon Professional Baseball	(Japan) Toyooka, Hyōgo
Shogo Akiyama	55	OF	16 April 1988 (aged 28)	(Japan) Saitama Seibu Lions	Nippon Professional Baseball	(Japan) Yokosuka, Kanagawa
Nori Aoki	7	OF	5 January 1982 (aged 35)	(United States) Houston Astros	Major League Baseball	(Japan) Hyūga, Miyazaki
Ryosuke Hirata	8	OF	23 March 1988 (aged 28)	(Japan) Chunichi Dragons	Nippon Professional Baseball	(Japan) Jōtō-ku, Osaka
Seiya Suzuki	51	OF	18 August 1994 (aged 22)	(Japan) Hiroshima Toyo Carp	Nippon Professional Baseball	(Japan) Arakawa, Tokyo
Yoshitomo Tsutsugo	25	OF	26 November 1991 (aged 25)	(Japan) Yokohama DeNA BayStars	Nippon Professional Baseball	(Japan) Hashimoto, Wakayama
Seiichi Uchikawa	1	OF	4 August 1982 (aged 34)	(Japan) Fukuoka SoftBank Hawks	Nippon Professional Baseball	(Japan) Ōita, Ōita

=== Australia ===
Manager
(Australia) Jon Deeble
Coaches

Player	No.	Pos.	DOB and age	Team	League	Birthplace
Tim Atherton	37	P	14 September 1991 (aged 25)	(Australia) Canberra Cavalry	Australian Baseball League	(Australia) Kempsey, New South Wales
Tom Bailey*	49	P	15 August 1992 (aged 24)	(Australia) Perth Heat	Australian Baseball League	Perth, Western Australia
Travis Blackley	54	P	4 November 1982 (aged 34)	(United States) Detroit Tigers (minors)	Minor League Baseball	(Australia) Melbourne
Justin Erasmus*	36	P	22 January 1990 (aged 27)	(Germany) Haar Disciples	Bundesliga	Johannesburg, South Africa
Josh Guyer*	40	P	27 May 1994 (aged 22)	(Australia) Sydney Blue Sox	Australian Baseball League	(Australia) Tamworth, New South Wales
Samuel Holland*	46	P	20 February 1994 (aged 23)	(United States) Los Angeles Angels (minors)	Minor League Baseball	(Australia) Brisbane, Queensland
Jon Kennedy	50	P	20 September 1995 (aged 21)	(United States) Atlanta Braves (minors)	Minor League Baseball	(Australia) Melbourne
Steven Kent	25	P	8 May 1989 (aged 27)	(United States) Atlanta Braves (minors)	Minor League Baseball	(Australia) Canberra, Australian Capital Territory
Daniel McGrath*	52	P	7 July 1994 (aged 22)	(United States) Boston Red Sox (minors)	Minor League Baseball	(Australia) Melbourne
Peter Moylan	47	P	2 December 1978 (aged 38)	(Australia) Melbourne Aces	Australian Baseball League	Perth, Western Australia
Chris Oxspring*	35	P	13 May 1977 (aged 39)	(Australia) Sydney Blue Sox	Australian Baseball League	(Australia) Ipswich, Queensland
Ryan Rowland-Smith	18	P	26 January 1983 (aged 34)	(Australia) Brisbane Bandits	Australian Baseball League	(Australia) Sydney
Dushan Ruzic	38	P	5 January 1982 (aged 35)	(Australia) Melbourne Aces	Australian Baseball League	(Australia) Darwin, Northern Territory
Warwick Saupold	30	P	16 January 1990 (aged 27)	(United States) Detroit Tigers	Major League Baseball	Perth, Western Australia
Ryan Searle	44	P	22 June 1989 (aged 27)	(Italy) Fortitudo Baseball Bologna	Italian Baseball League	(Australia) Brisbane, Queensland
Sam Street*	59	P	18 March 1992 (aged 24)	(United States) Pittsburgh Pirates (minors)	Minor League Baseball	(Australia) Melbourne
Josh Tols	13	P	6 October 1989 (aged 27)	(United States) Kansas City T-Bones	American Association	Adelaide, South Australia
Todd Van Steensel	21	P	14 November 1991 (aged 25)	(United States) Minnesota Twins (minors)	Minor League Baseball	(Australia) Sydney
Alex Wells	56	P	27 February 1997 (aged 20)	(United States) Baltimore Orioles (minors)	Minor League Baseball	(Australia) Newcastle, New South Wales
Lachlan Wells	68	P	27 February 1997 (aged 20)	(United States) Minnesota Twins (minors)	Minor League Baseball	(Australia) Newcastle, New South Wales
Matthew Williams	19	P	28 February 1987 (aged 30)	(Australia) Adelaide Bite	Australian Baseball League	(Australia) Camden, New South Wales
Allan de San Miguel	11	C	13 December 1984 (aged 32)	(United States) Kansas City Royals (minors)	Minor League Baseball	Bentley, Western Australia
Robbie Perkins	9	C	29 May 1994 (aged 22)	(United States) Colorado Rockies (minors)	Minor League Baseball	(Australia) Canberra, Australian Capital Territory
James Beresford	5	IF	19 January 1989 (aged 28)	(Australia) Melbourne Aces	Australian Baseball League	(Australia) Monash, Victoria
Brad Harman	12	IF	19 November 1985 (aged 31)	(Australia) Melbourne Aces	Australian Baseball League	(Australia) Melbourne
Luke Hughes	16	IF	2 August 1984 (aged 32)	(Australia) Perth Heat	Australian Baseball League	Perth, Western Australia
Tim Kennelly	23	IF	5 December 1986 (aged 30)	(Australia) Perth Heat	Australian Baseball League	Perth, Western Australia
Mitch Nilsson	15	IF	24 May 1991 (aged 25)	(Australia) Brisbane Bandits	Australian Baseball League	(Australia) Brisbane, Queensland
Logan Wade	4	IF	13 November 1991 (aged 25)	(Australia) Brisbane Bandits	Australian Baseball League	(Australia) Brisbane, Queensland
Stefan Welch	22	IF	12 August 1988 (aged 28)	(Australia) Adelaide Bite	Australian Baseball League	(Australia) Alice Springs, Northern Territory
Mitch Dening	17	OF	17 August 1988 (aged 28)	(Australia) Adelaide Bite	Australian Baseball League	(Australia) Toowoon Bay, New South Wales
David Kandilas	29	OF	14 September 1990 (aged 26)	(Australia) Sydney Blue Sox	Australian Baseball League	(Australia) Sydney
Trent Oeltjen	10	OF	28 February 1983 (aged 34)	(Australia) Brisbane Bandits	Australian Baseball League	(Australia) Sydney
Aaron Whitefield	48	OF	2 September 1996 (aged 20)	(United States) Minnesota Twins (minors)	Minor League Baseball	(Australia) Brisbane, Queensland

=== China ===
Manager
(United States) (7) John McLaren
Coaches
(49) Dave Bush, Jimmy Johnson, (78) Luo Weijun, (29) Yi Sheng, Zhang Xiaotian, (71) Zhou Wanbi

Player	No.	Pos.	DOB and age	Team	League	Birthplace
Bruce Chen	52	P	19 June 1977 (aged 39)			Panama City, Panama
Chen Kun	33	P	5 March 1980 (aged 37)	(China) Sichuan Dragons	China Baseball League	(China) Panzhihua
Andrew Chin	28	P	22 September 1992 (aged 24)			Newton, United States
Gan Quan	23	P	17 June 1996 (aged 20)	(China) Sichuan Dragons	China Baseball League	(China) Sichuan
Gong Haicheng	35	P	28 December 1998 (aged 18)	(China) MLB Development Center		(China) Bengbu
Ju Kwon	60	P	31 May 1995 (aged 21)	(South Korea) KT Wiz	KBO League	(China) Jilin
Li Xin	11	P	17 April 1992 (aged 24)	(China) Tianjin Lions	China Baseball League	(China) Tianjin
Liu Yu	8	P	15 September 1991 (aged 25)	(China) Beijing Tigers	China Baseball League	(China) Beijing
Lu Chao	5	P	9 October 1988 (aged 28)	(China) Guangdong Leopards	China Baseball League	
Lu Yusong	68	P	6 February 1992 (aged 25)	(China) Henan Elephants	China Baseball League	
Luo Xia	36	P	14 July 1992 (aged 24)	(China) Sichuan Dragons	China Baseball League	(China) Sichuan
Qi Jiping	19	P	5 December 1995 (aged 21)	(China) Shanghai Golden Eagles	China Baseball League	
Wang Menghao	31	P	25 September 1992 (aged 24)	(China) Sichuan Dragons	China Baseball League	
Zheng Chaoqun	15	P	9 February 1993 (aged 24)	(China) Jiangsu Pegasus	China Baseball League	
Li Ning	10	C	12 November 1994 (aged 22)	(China) Shanghai Golden Eagles	China Baseball League	
Meng Weiqiang	2	C	31 May 1989 (aged 27)	(China) Guangdong Leopards	China Baseball League	(China) Guangdong
Wang Wei	56	C	25 December 1978 (aged 38)	(China) Beijing Tigers	China Baseball League	(China) Beijing
Ray Chang	21	IF	24 August 1983 (aged 33)			Kansas City, United States
Chen Yanpeng	62	IF	26 May 1996 (aged 20)	(China) MLB Development Center		(China) Guangdong
Chu Fujia	30	IF	10 September 1989 (aged 27)	(China) Jiangsu Pegasus	China Baseball League	(China) Jiangsu
Du Xiaolei	12	IF	25 May 1990 (aged 26)	(China) Jiangsu Pegasus	China Baseball League	(China) Wuxi
Li Zeyuan	38	IF	23 April 1986 (aged 30)	(China) Beijing Tigers	China Baseball League	(China) Beijing
Joey Wong	16	IF	12 April 1988 (aged 28)	(Australia) Perth Heat	Australian Baseball League	Salem, United States
Xu Guiyuan	51	IF	29 January 1996 (aged 21)	(United States) Baltimore Orioles (minors)	Minor League Baseball	(China) Puning
Lu Zhenhong	65	OF	15 April 1991 (aged 25)	(China) Jiangsu Pegasus	China Baseball League	(China) Jiangsu
Na Chuang	66	OF	15 March 1987 (aged 29)	(China) Guangdong Leopards	China Baseball League	(China) Guangdong
Yang Shunyi	26	OF	1 January 1993 (aged 24)	(China) Guangdong Leopards	China Baseball League	(China) Tianjin
Yang Yanyong	6	OF	5 May 1994 (aged 22)	(China) Shanghai Golden Eagles	China Baseball League	Mongolia

=== Cuba ===
Manager
25 Carlos Martí
Coaches
23 Orelvis Ávila (pitching), 46 Orestes Kindelán (hitting), 62 Ciro Licea (pitching), Carlos Louis, 77 Ramón Rodríguez (third base), 37 Mario Vega (first base)

Player	No.	Pos.	DOB and age	Team	League	Birthplace
Freddy Álvarez*	–	P	29 April 1989 (aged 27)	(Cuba) Cocodrilos de Matanzas	Cuban National Series	(Cuba) Sagua La Grande
Vladimir Baños	59	P	17 January 1983 (aged 34)	(Cuba) Ciego de Ávila	Cuban National Series	(Cuba) Pinar del Río
Lázaro Blanco	79	P	3 February 1986 (aged 31)	(Cuba) Granma	Cuban National Series	(Cuba) Yara
Erly Casanova**	–	P	25 July 1985 (aged 31)	(Cuba) Camagüey	Cuban National Series	(Cuba) Pinar del Río
Yoalkis Cruz**	–	P	28 May 1979 (aged 37)	(Cuba) Granma	Cuban National Series	(Cuba) Las Tunas
Dachel Duquesne**	–	P	1 January 1988 (aged 29)	(Cuba) Ciego de Ávila	Cuban National Series	(Cuba) Ciego de Ávila
Vladimir García	34	P	4 July 1982 (aged 34)	(Cuba) Ciego de Ávila	Cuban National Series	(Cuba) Ciego de Ávila
Liomil González	–	P	24 August 1990 (aged 26)	(Cuba) Ciego de Ávila	Cuban National Series	(Cuba) Ciego de Ávila
Yasmany Hernández**	–	P	1 January 1985 (aged 32)	(Cuba) Villa Clara	Cuban National Series	(Cuba) Villa Clara
Miguel Lahera	44	P	24 January 1985 (aged 32)	(Cuba) Granma	Cuban National Series	(Cuba) Artemisa
Jonder Martínez**	27	P	22 June 1978 (aged 38)	(Cuba) Matanzas	Cuban National Series	(Cuba) Mariel
Leandro Martínez*	71	P	30 November 1980 (aged 36)	(Cuba) Granma	Cuban National Series	(Cuba) Campechuela
Raidel Martínez	95	P	11 October 1996 (aged 20)	(Cuba) Pinar del Río	Cuban National Series	(Cuba) Pinar del Río
Frank Medina**	–	P	1 January 1988 (aged 29)	(Cuba) Pinar del Río	Cuban National Series	(Cuba) Pinar del Río
Noelvis Entenza	90	P	1 January 1989 (aged 28)	(Cuba) Holguín	Cuban National Series	(Cuba) Palmira
José García	99	P	23 February 1981 (aged 36)	(Cuba) Ciego de Ávila	Cuban National Series	(Cuba) Artemisa
Liván Moinelo	89	P	8 December 1995 (aged 21)	(Cuba) Holguín	Cuban National Series	(Cuba) Pinar del Río
José Rodríguez**	–	P	1 January 1992 (aged 25)	(Cuba) Isla de la Juventud	Cuban National Series	(Cuba) Camagüey
Alain Sánchez	41	P	1 January 1986 (aged 31)	(Cuba) Villa Clara	Cuban National Series	(Cuba) Cifuentes
Yosvani Torres	56	P	14 June 1980 (aged 36)	(Cuba) Villa Clara	Cuban National Series	(Cuba) Viñales
Yoanni Yera	58	P	18 October 1989 (aged 27)	(Cuba) Matanzas	Cuban National Series	(Cuba) Martí
Yosvany Alarcón	11	C	5 October 1984 (aged 32)	(Cuba) Las Tunas	Cuban National Series	(Cuba) Jobabo
Frank Morejón	45	C	25 January 1986 (aged 31)	(Cuba) Industriales	Cuban National Series	(Cuba) Havana
Osvaldo Vázquez	31	C	20 May 1990 (aged 26)	(Cuba) Ciego de Ávila	Cuban National Series	(Cuba) Ciego de Ávila
Guillermo Avilés	21	IF	20 January 1993 (aged 24)	(Cuba) Granma	Cuban National Series	(Cuba) Bayamo
Alexander Ayala	43	IF	1 January 1982 (aged 35)	(Cuba) Camagüey	Cuban National Series	(Cuba) Camagüey
Carlos Benítez	5	IF	1 January 1987 (aged 30)	(Cuba) Granma	Cuban National Series	(Cuba) Yara
Jefferson Delgado	12	IF	30 November 1982 (aged 34)	(Cuba) Matanzas	Cuban National Series	(Cuba) Santo Domingo
Yurisbel Gracial	47	IF	14 August 1985 (aged 31)	(Cuba) Matanzas	Cuban National Series	(Cuba) Guantánamo
Yordan Manduley	42	IF	9 February 1986 (aged 31)	(Cuba) Holguín	Cuban National Series	(Cuba) Calixto García
William Saavedra	28	IF	23 January 1981 (aged 36)	(Cuba) Matanzas	Cuban National Series	(Cuba) Pinar del Río
Frederich Cepeda	24	OF	8 April 1980 (aged 36)	(Cuba) Sancti Spíritus	Cuban National Series	(Cuba) Trinidad
Yoelqui Céspedes	16	OF	24 September 1997 (aged 19)	(Cuba) Granma	Cuban National Series	(Cuba) Yara
Alfredo Despaigne	54	OF	17 June 1986 (aged 30)	(Japan) Fukuoka SoftBank Hawks	Nippon Professional Baseball	(Cuba) Palma Soriano
Víctor Víctor Mesa	32	OF	1 January 1996 (aged 21)	(Cuba) Matanzas	Cuban National Series	(Cuba) Santa Clara
Roel Santos	10	OF	15 September 1987 (aged 29)	(Cuba) Granma	Cuban National Series	(Cuba) Niquero

== Pool C ==
=== United States ===
Manager
(United States) (11) Jim Leyland
Coaches

(61) Tom Brookens, (38) Jeff Jones, (53) Marcel Lachemann, (9) Tino Martinez, (42) Willie Randolph, (1) Alan Trammell

Player	No.	Pos.	DOB and age	Team	League	Birthplace
Chris Archer	4	P	26 August 1988 (aged 28)	(United States) Tampa Bay Rays	Major League Baseball	(United States) Raleigh, North Carolina
Brett Cecil**	21	P	2 July 1986 (aged 30)	(United States) St. Louis Cardinals	Major League Baseball	(United States) Dunkirk, Maryland
Tyler Clippard	29	P	14 February 1985 (aged 32)	(United States) New York Yankees	Major League Baseball	(United States) Lexington, Kentucky
Danny Duffy*	41	P	21 December 1988 (aged 28)	(United States) Kansas City Royals	Major League Baseball	(United States) Goleta, California
Sam Dyson	47	P	7 May 1988 (aged 28)	(United States) Texas Rangers	Major League Baseball	(United States) Tampa, Florida
Michael Fulmer**	32	P	15 March 1993 (aged 23)	(United States) Detroit Tigers	Major League Baseball	(United States) Oklahoma City, Oklahoma
Mychal Givens	60	P	13 May 1990 (aged 26)	(United States) Baltimore Orioles	Major League Baseball	(United States) Tampa, Florida
Luke Gregerson	18	P	14 May 1984 (aged 32)	(United States) Houston Astros	Major League Baseball	(United States) Park Ridge, Illinois
J. A. Happ**	33	P	19 October 1982 (aged 34)	(Canada) Toronto Blue Jays	Major League Baseball	(United States) Peru, Illinois
Nate Jones	65	P	28 January 1986 (aged 31)	(United States) Chicago White Sox	Major League Baseball	(United States) Covington, Kentucky
Jake McGee	51	P	6 August 1986 (aged 30)	(United States) Colorado Rockies	Major League Baseball	(United States) San Jose, California
Andrew Miller	24	P	21 May 1985 (aged 31)	(United States) Cleveland Indians	Major League Baseball	(United States) Gainesville, Florida
Pat Neshek	17	P	4 September 1980 (aged 36)	(United States) Philadelphia Phillies	Major League Baseball	(United States) Madison, Wisconsin
Tanner Roark*	57	P	5 October 1986 (aged 30)	(United States) Washington Nationals	Major League Baseball	(United States) Wilmington, Illinois
David Robertson	30	P	9 April 1985 (aged 31)	(United States) Chicago White Sox	Major League Baseball	(United States) Birmingham, Alabama
Drew Smyly**	34	P	13 June 1989 (aged 27)	(United States) Seattle Mariners	Major League Baseball	(United States) Maumelle, Arkansas
Marcus Stroman	6	P	1 May 1991 (aged 25)	(Canada) Toronto Blue Jays	Major League Baseball	(United States) Medford, New York
Alex Wilson**	–	P	3 November 1986 (aged 30)	(United States) Detroit Tigers	Major League Baseball	Dhahran, Saudi Arabia
Jonathan Lucroy	25	C	13 June 1986 (aged 30)	(United States) Texas Rangers	Major League Baseball	(United States) Eustis, Florida
Buster Posey	28	C	27 March 1987 (aged 29)	(United States) San Francisco Giants	Major League Baseball	(United States) Leesburg, Georgia
Nolan Arenado	12	IF	16 April 1991 (aged 25)	(United States) Colorado Rockies	Major League Baseball	(United States) Newport Beach, California
Alex Bregman	2	IF	30 March 1994 (aged 22)	(United States) Houston Astros	Major League Baseball	(United States) Albuquerque, New Mexico
Brandon Crawford	26	IF	21 January 1987 (aged 30)	(United States) San Francisco Giants	Major League Baseball	(United States) Mountain View, California
Paul Goldschmidt	44	IF	10 September 1987 (aged 29)	(United States) Arizona Diamondbacks	Major League Baseball	(United States) Wilmington, Delaware
Josh Harrison	5	IF	8 July 1987 (aged 29)	(United States) Pittsburgh Pirates	Major League Baseball	(United States) Cincinnati, Ohio
Eric Hosmer	35	IF	October 24, 1989 (aged 27)	(United States) Kansas City Royals	Major League Baseball	(United States) Cooper City, Florida
Ian Kinsler	3	IF	22 June 1982 (aged 34)	(United States) Detroit Tigers	Major League Baseball	(United States) Tucson, Arizona
Daniel Murphy	31	IF	1 April 1985 (aged 31)	(United States) Washington Nationals	Major League Baseball	(United States) Jacksonville, Florida
Adam Jones	10	OF	1 August 1985 (aged 31)	(United States) Baltimore Orioles	Major League Baseball	(United States) San Diego, California
Andrew McCutchen	22	OF	10 October 1986 (aged 30)	(United States) Pittsburgh Pirates	Major League Baseball	(United States) Fort Meade, Florida
Giancarlo Stanton	27	OF	8 November 1989 (aged 27)	(United States) Miami Marlins	Major League Baseball	(United States) Los Angeles, California
Christian Yelich	7	OF	5 December 1991 (aged 25)	(United States) Miami Marlins	Major League Baseball	(United States) Thousand Oaks, California

=== Canada ===
Manager
(United States) (12) Ernie Whitt
Coaches
(36) Denis Boucher, (8) Greg Hamilton, (34) Tim Leiper, (45) Paul Quantrill, (3) Larry Walker

Player	No.	Pos.	DOB and age	Team	League	Birthplace
Andrew Albers	27	P	6 October 1985 (aged 31)	(United States) Atlanta Braves (minors)	Minor League Baseball	(Canada) North Battleford, Saskatchewan
Andrew Case	75	P	6 January 1993 (aged 24)	(Canada) Toronto Blue Jays (minors)	Minor League Baseball	(Canada) Saint John, New Brunswick
Kevin Chapman	50	P	19 February 1988 (aged 29)	(United States) Atlanta Braves (minors)	Minor League Baseball	Coral Springs, United States
Shane Dawson	25	P	9 September 1993 (aged 23)	(Canada) Toronto Blue Jays (minors)	Minor League Baseball	(Canada) Drayton Valley, Alberta
Ryan Dempster	46	P	3 May 1977 (aged 39)			(Canada) Gibsons, British Columbia
Éric Gagné	38	P	7 January 1976 (aged 41)	(Canada) Ottawa Champions	Can-Am League	(Canada) Montreal, Quebec
Jim Henderson	51	P	21 October 1982 (aged 34)	(United States) Chicago Cubs (minors)	Minor League Baseball	(Canada) Calgary, Alberta
Ryan Kellogg	21	P	4 February 1994 (aged 23)	(United States) Chicago Cubs (minors)	Minor League Baseball	(Canada) Whitby, Ontario
Chris Leroux	63	P	14 April 1984 (aged 32)			(Canada) Montreal, Quebec
Scott Mathieson	47	P	27 February 1984 (aged 33)	(Japan) Yomiuri Giants	Nippon Professional Baseball	(Canada) Vancouver, British Columbia
Dustin Molleken	35	P	21 August 1984 (aged 32)	(United States) Detroit Tigers (minors)	Minor League Baseball	(Canada) Regina, Saskatchewan
Nick Pivetta	16	P	14 February 1993 (aged 24)	(United States) Philadelphia Phillies (minors)	Minor League Baseball	(Canada) Victoria, British Columbia
Scott Richmond	48	P	30 August 1979 (aged 37)	(Taiwan) Fubon Guardians	Chinese Professional Baseball	(Canada) North Vancouver, British Columbia
Jesen Therrien	22	P	18 March 1993 (aged 23)	(United States) Philadelphia Phillies (minors)	Minor League Baseball	(Canada) Montreal, Quebec
Rowan Wick	44	P	9 November 1992 (aged 24)	(United States) St. Louis Cardinals	Major League Baseball	(Canada) Langley, British Columbia
George Kottaras	22	C	10 May 1983 (aged 33)			(Canada) Scarborough, Ontario
Mike Reeves	24	C	16 September 1990 (aged 26)	(Canada) Toronto Blue Jays (minors)	Minor League Baseball	(Canada) Peterborough, Ontario
Freddie Freeman	5	IF	12 September 1989 (aged 27)	(United States) Atlanta Braves	Major League Baseball	Fountain Valley, United States
Jonathan Malo	11	IF	29 September 1983 (aged 33)	(Canada) Québec Capitales	Can-Am League	(Canada) Joliette, Quebec
Josh Naylor	32	IF	22 June 1997 (aged 19)	(United States) San Diego Padres (minors)	Minor League Baseball	(Canada) Mississauga, Ontario
Justin Morneau	33	IF	15 May 1981 (aged 35)			(Canada) New Westminster, British Columbia
Pete Orr	4	IF	8 June 1979 (aged 37)			(Canada) Richmond Hill, Ontario
Daniel Pinero	56	IF	2 May 1994 (aged 22)	(United States) Detroit Tigers (minors)	Minor League Baseball	(Canada) Toronto
Jamie Romak	26	IF	30 September 1985 (aged 31)	(United States) San Diego Padres (minors)	Minor League Baseball	(Canada) London, Ontario
Eric Wood	17	IF	22 November 1992 (aged 24)	(United States) Pittsburgh Pirates (minors)	Minor League Baseball	(Canada) Oshawa, Ontario
Michael Crouse	30	OF	22 November 1990 (aged 26)	(United States) Lancaster Barnstormers	Atlantic League	(Canada) Port Moody, British Columbia
Tyler O'Neill	13	OF	22 June 1995 (aged 21)	(United States) Seattle Mariners (minors)	Minor League Baseball	(Canada) Maple Ridge, British Columbia
Dalton Pompey	23	OF	11 December 1992 (aged 24)	(Canada) Toronto Blue Jays	Major League Baseball	(Canada) Mississauga, Ontario
Rene Tosoni	9	OF	2 July 1986 (aged 30)	(United States) Sugar Land Skeeters	Atlantic League	(Canada) Toronto

Ryan Kellogg replaced Adam Loewen, (who was originally named to the team), on 1 March 2017.

=== Colombia ===
Manager
(Colombia) (40) Luis Urueta
Coaches
Jolbert Cabrera, (5) Jair Fernández, (33) Néder Horta, (44) Walter Miranda, (16) Édgar Rentería, (7) Luis Sierra

Player	No.	Pos.	DOB and age	Team	League	Birthplace
Horacio Acosta*	30	P	24 October 1990 (aged 26)	(United States) Normal CornBelters	Frontier League	Miami, United States
Kendy Batista**	52	P	5 July 1981 (aged 35)	(Venezuela) Cardenales de Lara	Liga Venezolana de Béisbol	Santa Bárbara, Venezuela
Randy Consuegra**	27	P	14 October 1989 (aged 27)	(Colombia) Caimanes de Barranquilla	Liga Colombiana de Béisbol	(Colombia) Barranquilla, Bolívar
Nabil Crismatt	34	P	25 December 1994 (aged 22)	(United States) New York Mets (minors)	Minor League Baseball	(Colombia) Barranquilla, Bolívar
William Cuevas	63	P	14 October 1990 (aged 26)	(United States) Detroit Tigers (minors)	Minor League Baseball	Turmero, Venezuela
Dayán Díaz	50	P	10 February 1989 (aged 28)	(United States) Houston Astros (minors)	Minor League Baseball	(Colombia) Cartagena, Bolívar
Luis Escobar**	64	P	30 May 1996 (aged 20)	(United States) Pittsburgh Pirates (minors)	Minor League Baseball	(Colombia) Cartagena, Bolívar
Ernesto Frieri	25	P	19 July 1985 (aged 31)	(Colombia) Leones de Montería	Liga Colombiana de Béisbol	(Colombia) Arjona, Bolívar
Tayron Guerrero	55	P	9 January 1991 (aged 26)	(United States) Miami Marlins	Major League Baseball	(Colombia) Bocachica, Bolívar
Sugar Ray Marimón	54	P	30 September 1988 (aged 28)	(Colombia) Tigres de Cartagena	Liga Colombiana de Béisbol	(Colombia) Cartagena, Bolívar
Erling Moreno**	65	P	13 January 1997 (aged 20)	(United States) Chicago Cubs (minors)	Minor League Baseball	(Colombia) Cartagena, Bolívar
Guillermo Moscoso	70	P	14 November 1983 (aged 33)	(Japan) Yokohama Bay Stars	Japan Central League	Maracay, Venezuela
Greg Nappo*	14	P	25 August 1988 (aged 28)	(United States) Miami Marlins (minors)	Minor League Baseball	Madison, United States
Javier Ortiz	43	P	28 November 1979 (aged 37)	(Colombia) Leones de Montería	Liga Colombiana de Béisbol	(Colombia) Cartagena, Bolívar
Yohan Pino	45	P	26 December 1983 (aged 33)	(United States) Minnesota Twins (minors)	Minor League Baseball	Turmero, Venezuela
José Quintana	62	P	24 January 1989 (aged 28)	(United States) Chicago White Sox	Major League Baseball	(Colombia) Arjona, Bolívar
Reiver Sanmartín**	28	P	15 April 1996 (aged 20)	(United States) Texas Rangers (minors)	Minor League Baseball	(Colombia) Cartagena, Bolívar
Julio Teherán	49	P	27 January 1991 (aged 26)	(United States) Atlanta Braves	Major League Baseball	(Colombia) Cartagena, Bolívar
Karl Triana	32	P	7 November 1992 (aged 24)	(Colombia) Leones de Montería	Liga Colombiana de Béisbol	(Colombia) Cartagena, Bolívar
Ángel Vílchez**	60	P	7 November 1992 (aged 24)	(Colombia) Caimanes de Barranquilla	Liga Colombiana de Béisbol	Maracaibo, Venezuela
Ezequiel Zabaleta**	41	P	20 August 1995 (aged 21)	(United States) New York Mets (minors)	Minor League Baseball	(Colombia) Bolívar, Bolívar
Jorge Alfaro	38	C	11 June 1993 (aged 23)	(United States) Philadelphia Phillies	Major League Baseball	(Colombia) Sincelejo, Sucre
Jhonatan Solano	21	C	12 August 1985 (aged 31)	(United States) Washington Nationals (minors)	Minor League Baseball	(Colombia) Barranquilla, Bolívar
Meibrys Viloria	4	C	15 February 1997 (aged 20)	(United States) Kansas City Royals (minors)	Minor League Baseball	(Colombia) Cartagena, Bolívar
Mauricio Ramos	22	IF	2 February 1992 (aged 25)	(United States) Kansas City Royals (minors)	Minor League Baseball	(Colombia) Cartagena, Bolívar
Reynaldo Rodriguez	6	IF	2 July 1986 (aged 30)	(United States) Minnesota Twins (minors)	Minor League Baseball	(Colombia) Cartagena, Bolívar
Adrián Sánchez	13	IF	16 August 1990 (aged 26)	(United States) Washington Nationals (minors)	Minor League Baseball	Maracaibo, Venezuela
Donovan Solano	17	IF	17 December 1987 (aged 29)	(United States) New York Yankees (minors)	Minor League Baseball	(Colombia) Barranquilla, Bolívar
Giovanny Urshela	39	IF	11 October 1991 (aged 25)	(United States) Cleveland Indians	Major League Baseball	(Colombia) Cartagena, Bolívar
Efrain Contreras	18	OF	6 February 1987 (aged 30)	(Colombia) Caimanes de Barranquilla	Liga Colombiana de Béisbol	Maracay, Venezuela
Oscar Mercado	12	OF	16 December 1994 (aged 22)	(United States) St. Louis Cardinals (minors)	Minor League Baseball	(Colombia) Cartagena, Bolívar
Tito Polo	9	OF	23 August 1994 (aged 22)	(United States) New York Yankees (minors)	Minor League Baseball	(Colombia) San Andrés, San Andrés y Providencia
Jesús Valdez	25	OF	2 November 1984 (aged 32)	(Mexico) Leones de Yucatán	Liga Mexicana de Béisbol	San Cristóbal, Dominican Republic

=== Dominican Republic ===
Manager
(Dominican Republic) Tony Peña
Coaches

Player	No.	Pos.	DOB and age	Team	League	Birthplace
Fernando Abad*	58	P	17 December 1985 (aged 31)	(United States) Boston Red Sox	Major League Baseball	La Romana, Dominican Republic
Dellin Betances	68	P	23 March 1988 (aged 28)	(United States) New York Yankees	Major League Baseball	(United States) New York City
Álex Colomé	37	P	31 December 1988 (aged 28)	(United States) Tampa Bay Rays	Major League Baseball	Santo Domingo, Dominican Republic
Bartolo Colón**	40	P	24 May 1973 (aged 43)	(United States) Atlanta Braves	Major League Baseball	Altamira, Dominican Republic
Samuel Deduno*	21	P	2 July 1983 (aged 33)			La Romana, Dominican Republic
Jumbo Díaz	70	P	27 February 1984 (aged 33)	(United States) Tampa Bay Rays	Major League Baseball	La Romana, Dominican Republic
Jeurys Familia	27	P	10 August 1989 (aged 27)	(United States) New York Mets	Major League Baseball	San Cristobal, Dominican Republic
Édgar García**	–	P	20 September 1987 (aged 29)			Las Matas de Farfán, Dominican Republic
Héctor Neris	50	P	14 June 1989 (aged 27)	(United States) Philadelphia Phillies	Major League Baseball	San Cristobal, Dominican Republic
Iván Nova**	–	P	12 January 1987 (aged 30)	(United States) Pittsburgh Pirates	Major League Baseball	San Cristóbal, Dominican Republic
Carlos Martínez	18	P	21 September 1991 (aged 25)	(United States) St. Louis Cardinals	Major League Baseball	Puerto Plata, Dominican Republic
Wily Peralta*	38	P	8 May 1989 (aged 27)	(United States) Milwaukee Brewers	Major League Baseball	Samaná, Dominican Republic
Alex Reyes**	61	P	29 August 1994 (aged 22)	(United States) St. Louis Cardinals	Major League Baseball	(United States) Elizabeth, New Jersey
Hansel Robles	74	P	13 August 1990 (aged 26)	(United States) New York Mets	Major League Baseball	Bonao, Dominican Republic
Fernando Rodney	56	P	18 March 1977 (aged 39)	(United States) Arizona Diamondbacks	Major League Baseball	Samaná, Dominican Republic
Bryan Rodriguez**	–	P	6 July 1991 (aged 25)	(United States) San Diego Padres (minors)	Minor League Baseball	San Pedro de Macorís, Dominican Republic
Enny Romero	45	P	24 January 1991 (aged 26)	(United States) Washington Nationals	Major League Baseball	Santo Domingo, Dominican Republic
Luis Severino**	–	P	20 February 1994 (aged 23)	(United States) New York Yankees	Major League Baseball	Sabana de la Mar, Dominican Republic
César Valdez	76	P	17 March 1985 (aged 31)	(United States) Oakland Athletics (minors)	Minor League Baseball	Santo Domingo, Dominican Republic
Edinson Vólquez	36	P	3 July 1983 (aged 33)	(United States) Miami Marlins	Major League Baseball	Barahona, Dominican Republic
Welington Castillo	35	C	24 April 1987 (aged 29)	(United States) Baltimore Orioles	Major League Baseball	San Isidro, Dominican Republic
Alberto Rosario	86	C	10 January 1987 (aged 30)	(United States) St. Louis Cardinals	Major League Baseball	Bonao, Dominican Republic
Adrián Beltré	29	IF	7 April 1979 (aged 37)	(United States) Texas Rangers	Major League Baseball	Santo Domingo, Dominican Republic
Robinson Canó	22	IF	22 October 1982 (aged 34)	(United States) Seattle Mariners	Major League Baseball	San Pedro de Macorís, Dominican Republic
Manny Machado	3	IF	6 July 1992 (aged 24)	(United States) Baltimore Orioles	Major League Baseball	(United States) Hialeah, Florida
José Reyes	7	IF	11 June 1983 (aged 33)	(United States) New York Mets	Major League Baseball	Villa González, Dominican Republic
Carlos Santana	41	IF	8 April 1986 (aged 30)	(United States) Cleveland Indians	Major League Baseball	Santo Domingo, Dominican Republic
Jean Segura	2	IF	17 March 1990 (aged 26)	(United States) Seattle Mariners	Major League Baseball	San Juan, Dominican Republic
Jonathan Villar	5	IF	2 May 1991 (aged 25)	(United States) Milwaukee Brewers	Major League Baseball	La Vega, Dominican Republic
José Bautista	19	OF	19 October 1980 (aged 36)	(Canada) Toronto Blue Jays	Major League Baseball	Santo Domingo, Dominican Republic
Nelson Cruz	23	OF	1 July 1980 (aged 36)	(United States) Seattle Mariners	Major League Baseball	Monte Cristi, Dominican Republic
Starling Marte	6	OF	9 October 1988 (aged 28)	(United States) Pittsburgh Pirates	Major League Baseball	Santo Domingo, Dominican Republic
Gregory Polanco	25	OF	14 September 1991 (aged 25)	(United States) Pittsburgh Pirates	Major League Baseball	Santo Domingo, Dominican Republic
Mel Rojas, Jr.	48	OF	24 May 1990 (aged 26)	(United States) Atlanta Braves (minors)	Minor League Baseball	(United States) Indianapolis, Indiana

== Pool D ==
=== Mexico ===
Manager
(Mexico) (9) Edgar González
Coaches
(53) Rigoberto Beltrán, (16) Nick Leyva, (37) Bobby Magallanes, (12) Anthony Medrano, (26) Alex Pelaez, (56) José Silva, (34) Fernando Valenzuela

Player	No.	Pos.	DOB and age	Team	League	Birthplace
Miguel Aguilar*	31	P	26 September 1991 (aged 25)	(United States) Arizona Diamondbacks (minors)	Minor League Baseball	(Mexico) Ciudad Obregón, Sonora
Andrés Ávila**	33	P	20 June 1990 (aged 26)	(United States) Atlanta Braves (minors)	Minor League Baseball	(Mexico) Guaymas, Sonora
Marco Estrada**	25	P	5 July 1983 (aged 33)	(Canada) Toronto Blue Jays	Major League Baseball	(Mexico) Ciudad Obregón, Sonora
Carlos Fisher**	21	P	22 February 1983 (aged 34)	(United States) San Diego Padres (minors)	Minor League Baseball	West Covina, United States
Yovani Gallardo	49	P	27 February 1986 (aged 31)	(United States) Seattle Mariners	Major League Baseball	(Mexico) Penjamillo, Michoacán
Giovanny Gallegos	28	P	14 August 1991 (aged 25)	(United States) New York Yankees	Major League Baseball	(Mexico) Ciudad Obregón, Sonora
Miguel González	58	P	27 May 1984 (aged 32)	(United States) Chicago White Sox	Major League Baseball	(Mexico) Tepatitlán de Morelos, Jalisco
Rafael Martin**	30	P	16 May 1984 (aged 32)	(United States) Washington Nationals	Major League Baseball	San Fernando, United States
Luis Mendoza*	39	P	31 August 1983 (aged 33)	(Japan) Hokkaido Nippon-Ham Fighters	Nippon Professional Baseball	(Mexico) Veracruz, Veracruz
Mario Meza**	43	P	24 November 1990 (aged 26)	(United States) Chicago Cubs (minors)	Minor League Baseball	(Mexico) Culiacán, Sinaloa
Vidal Nuño	38	P	26 July 1987 (aged 29)	(United States) Baltimore Orioles	Major League Baseball	National City, United States
Roberto Osuna*	18	P	7 February 1995 (aged 22)	(Canada) Toronto Blue Jays	Major League Baseball	(Mexico) Juan José Ríos, Sinaloa
Óliver Pérez	46	P	15 August 1981 (aged 35)	(United States) Washington Nationals	Major League Baseball	(Mexico) Culiacán, Sinaloa
Daniel Rodríguez	10	P	11 December 1984 (aged 32)	(Mexico) Saraperos de Saltillo	Liga Mexicana de Beisbol	(Mexico) Culiacán, Sinaloa
Sergio Romo	54	P	4 March 1983 (aged 34)	(United States) Los Angeles Dodgers	Major League Baseball	Brawley, United States
Fernando Salas	59	P	30 May 1985 (aged 31)	(United States) New York Mets	Major League Baseball	(Mexico) Huatabampo, Sonora
Iván Salas**	40	P	30 December 1990 (aged 26)	(Mexico) Piratas de Campeche	Liga Mexicana de Béisbol	(Mexico) Navojoa, Sonora
Jake Sanchez	55	P	19 August 1989 (aged 27)	(United States) Oakland Athletics (minors)	Minor League Baseball	Brawley, United States
Joakim Soria	48	P	18 May 1984 (aged 32)	(United States) Kansas City Royals	Major League Baseball	(Mexico) Monclova, Coahuila
Carlos Torres	72	P	22 November 1982 (aged 34)	(United States) Milwaukee Brewers	Major League Baseball	Santa Cruz, United States
Julio Urías**	7	P	12 August 1996 (aged 20)	(United States) Los Angeles Dodgers	Major League Baseball	(Mexico) Culiacán, Sinaloa
Xorge Carrillo	14	C	12 April 1989 (aged 27)	(United States) New York Mets (minors)	Minor League Baseball	(Mexico) Tijuana, Baja California
Sebastián Valle	52	C	24 July 1990 (aged 26)	(United States) Seattle Mariners (minors)	Minor League Baseball	(Mexico) Los Mochis, Sinaloa
Japhet Amador	42	IF	19 January 1987 (aged 30)	(Japan) Tohoku Rakuten Golden Eagles	Nippon Professional Baseball	(Mexico) Mulegé, Baja California Sur
Luis Cruz	47	IF	10 February 1984 (aged 33)	(Japan) Yomiuri Giants	Nippon Professional Baseball	(Mexico) Navojoa, Sonora
Adrián González	23	IF	8 May 1982 (aged 34)	(United States) Los Angeles Dodgers	Major League Baseball	San Diego, United States
Brandon Laird	5	IF	11 September 1987 (aged 29)	(Japan) Hokkaido Nippon-Ham Fighters	Nippon Professional Baseball	Cypress, United States
Esteban Quiroz	17	IF	17 February 1992 (aged 25)	(Mexico) Leones de Yucatán	Liga Mexicana de Béisbol	(Mexico) Ciudad Obregón, Sonora
José Manuel Rodríguez	13	IF	28 July 1982 (aged 34)	(Mexico) Acereros de Monclova	Liga Mexicana de Béisbol	(Mexico) Guasave, Sinaloa
Luis Urías	3	IF	3 June 1997 (aged 19)	(United States) San Diego Padres (minors)	Minor League Baseball	(Mexico) Magdalena de Kino, Sonora
Sebastián Elizalde	20	OF	20 November 1991 (aged 25)	(United States) Cincinnati Reds (minors)	Minor League Baseball	(Mexico) Guaymas, Sonora
Efren Navarro	24	OF	14 May 1986 (aged 30)	(United States) Detroit Tigers (minors)	Minor League Baseball	Lynwood, United States
Chris Roberson	15	OF	23 August 1979 (aged 37)	(Mexico) Sultanes de Monterrey	Liga Mexicana de Béisbol	Oakland, United States
Alex Verdugo	27	F	15 May 1996 (aged 20)	(United States) Los Angeles Dodgers (minors)	Minor League Baseball	Tucson, United States

=== Italy ===
Manager
(Italy) Marco Mazzieri
Coaches

Player	No.	Pos.	DOB and age	Team	League	Birthplace
Filippo Crepaldi**	33	P	19 February 1992 (aged 25)	(Italy) UnipolSai Bologna	Italian Baseball League	Rovigo, Italy
Tiago da Silva	35	P	28 March 1985 (aged 31)	(Mexico) Generales de Durango	Liga Mexicana de Béisbol	Sao Paulo, Brazil
Frank DeJiulio**	23	P	22 August 1989 (aged 27)			Fort Lauderdale, Florida, United States
Mike DeMark	25	P	20 May 1983 (aged 33)	(United States) York Revolution	Atlantic League	Greensburg, Pennsylvania, United States
Jose Escalona**	57	P	7 January 1986 (aged 31)	(Italy) Rimini Baseball	Italian Baseball League	Lara, Venezuela
Nick Fanti	22	P	30 December 1996 (aged 20)	(United States) Philadelphia Phillies (minors)	Minor League Baseball	Hauppauge, New York, United States
Frailyn Florian	59	P	25 July 1982 (aged 34)	T&A San Marino	Italian Baseball League	Gaspar Hernández, Dominican Republic
Sam Gaviglio	32	P	22 May 1990 (aged 26)	(Canada) Toronto Blue Jays (minors)	Minor League Baseball	Ashland, Oregon, United States
Tommy Layne	39	P	2 November 1984 (aged 32)	(United States) New York Yankees	Major League Baseball	St. Louis, Missouri, United States
Luis Lugo	47	P	5 March 1994 (aged 23)	(United States) Cleveland Indians (minors)	Minor League Baseball	Barquisimeto, Venezuela
Alessandro Maestri	17	P	1 June 1985 (aged 31)	(Japan) Gunma Diamond Pegasus	Baseball Challenge League	Cesena, Italy
A. J. Morris	30	P	1 December 1986 (aged 30)			Houston, Texas, United States
Trey Nielsen	41	P	1 September 1991 (aged 25)	(United States) St. Louis Cardinals (minors)	Minor League Baseball	Salt Lake City, Utah, United States
Junior Oberto*	38	P	30 December 1980 (aged 36)	T&A San Marino	Italian Baseball League	Barquisimeto, Venezuela
Luca Panerati**	54	P	2 December 1989 (aged 27)	(Italy) UnipolSai Bologna	Italian Baseball League	Grosseto, Italy
Jordan Romano	28	P	21 April 1993 (aged 23)	(Canada) Toronto Blue Jays (minors)	Minor League Baseball	Markham, Ontario, Canada
Pat Venditte	20	P	30 October 1985 (aged 31)	(United States) Seattle Mariners (minors)	Minor League Baseball	Omaha, Nebraska, United States
Drew Butera	9	C	9 August 1983 (aged 33)	(United States) Kansas City Royals	Major League Baseball	Evansville, Indiana, United States
Francisco Cervelli	29	C	6 March 1986 (aged 31)	(United States) Pittsburgh Pirates	Major League Baseball	Valencia, Venezuela
Marco Sabbatani	14	C	13 April 1989 (aged 27)	(Italy) UnipolSai Bologna	Italian Baseball League	Ravenna, Italy
Gavin Cecchini	2	IF	22 December 1993 (aged 23)	(United States) New York Mets	Major League Baseball	Lake Charles, Louisiana, United States
Chris Colabello	12	IF	24 October 1983 (aged 33)	(United States) Cleveland Indians (minors)	Minor League Baseball	Framingham, Massachusetts, United States
Daniel Descalso	3	IF	19 October 1986 (aged 30)	(United States) Arizona Diamondbacks	Major League Baseball	Redwood City, California, United States
Alex Liddi	10	IF	14 August 1988 (aged 28)	(Mexico) Tigres de Quintana Roo	Liga Mexicana de Béisbol	San Remo, Italy
Drew Maggi	37	IF	16 May 1989 (aged 27)	(United States) Los Angeles Dodgers (minors)	Minor League Baseball	Phoenix, Arizona, United States
Rob Segedin	21	IF	10 November 1988 (aged 28)	(United States) Los Angeles Dodgers	Major League Baseball	Old Tappan, New Jersey, United States
Alessandro Vaglio	18	IF	28 January 1989 (aged 28)	(Italy) UnipolSai Bologna	Italian Baseball League	Montefiascone, Italy
John Andreoli	77	OF	9 June 1990 (aged 26)	(United States) Chicago Cubs (minors)	Minor League Baseball	Worcester, Massachusetts, United States
Mario Chiarini	45	OF	7 January 1981 (aged 36)	T&A San Marino	Italian Baseball League	Rimini, Italy
Brandon Nimmo	24	OF	27 March 1993 (aged 23)	(United States) New York Mets	Major League Baseball	Cheyenne, Wyoming, United States
Sebastiano Poma	26	OF	13 June 1993 (aged 23)	T&A San Marino	Italian Baseball League	Parma, Italy

=== Puerto Rico ===
Manager
(Puerto Rico) (36) Edwin Rodríguez
Coaches
(8) Carlos Baerga, (27) Ricky Bones, (25) Carlos Delgado, (6) Joe Espada, (19) Juan González, (26) José Molina, (50) José Rosado, (22) José Valentín

Player	No.	Pos.	DOB and age	Team	League	Birthplace
Andrew Barbosa no**	51	P	18 November 1987 (aged 29)	(United States) Milwaukee Brewers (minors)	Minor League Baseball	San Juan, Puerto Rico
José Berríos	37	P	27 May 1994 (aged 22)	(United States) Minnesota Twins	Major League Baseball	Bayamón, Puerto Rico
Hiram Burgos	54	P	4 August 1987 (aged 29)	(United States) Milwaukee Brewers (minors)	Minor League Baseball	Cayey, Puerto Rico
Alex Claudio	58	P	31 January 1992 (aged 25)	(United States) Texas Rangers	Major League Baseball	San Juan, Puerto Rico
Joe Colón*	29	P	18 February 1990 (aged 27)	(United States) Cleveland Indians	Major League Baseball	Caguas, Puerto Rico
José De La Torre**	52	P	17 October 1985 (aged 31)	(Mexico) Piratas de Campeche	Liga Mexicana de Béisbol	San Juan, Puerto Rico
José De León*	87	P	7 August 1992 (aged 24)	(United States) Tampa Bay Rays	Major League Baseball	Isabela, Puerto Rico
Edwin Díaz	39	P	22 March 1994 (aged 22)	(United States) Seattle Mariners	Major League Baseball	Naguabo, Puerto Rico
Joe Jiménez	43	P	17 January 1995 (aged 22)	(United States) Detroit Tigers (minors)	Minor League Baseball	San Juan, Puerto Rico
Jorge López	28	P	10 February 1993 (aged 24)	(United States) Milwaukee Brewers	Major League Baseball	Cayey, Puerto Rico
Seth Lugo	67	P	17 November 1989 (aged 27)	(United States) New York Mets	Major League Baseball	(United States) Shreveport, Louisiana
Emilio Pagan	13	P	7 May 1991 (aged 25)	(United States) Seattle Mariners (minors)	Minor League Baseball	(United States) Simpsonville, South Carolina
Joel Piñeiro**	38	P	25 September 1978 (aged 38)	(Puerto Rico) Criollos de Caguas	Liga Roberto Clemente	Río Piedras, Puerto Rico
Dereck Rodríguez**	30	P	5 June 1992 (aged 24)	(United States) Minnesota Twins (minors)	Minor League Baseball	(United States) Arlington, Texas
Orlando Román	34	P	28 November 1978 (aged 38)	(Taiwan) Lamigo Monkeys	Chinese Professional Baseball	Bayamón, Puerto Rico
J. C. Romero	32	P	4 June 1976 (aged 40)	(Puerto Rico) Criollos de Caguas	Liga Roberto Clemente	Río Piedras, Puerto Rico
Andrés Santiago**	48	P	26 October 1989 (aged 27)	(Puerto Rico) Criollos de Caguas	Liga Roberto Clemente	Cataño, Puerto Rico
Hector Santiago	56	P	16 December 1987 (aged 29)	(United States) Minnesota Twins	Major League Baseball	(United States) Newark, New Jersey
Mario Santiago**	41	P	16 December 1984 (aged 32)	(Puerto Rico) Cardenales de Lajas	Béisbol Doble A	Guayama, Puerto Rico
Giovanni Soto	35	P	18 May 1991 (aged 25)	(United States) Chicago White Sox (minors)	Minor League Baseball	Carolina, Puerto Rico
Yadier Molina	4	C	13 July 1982 (aged 34)	(United States) St. Louis Cardinals	Major League Baseball	Bayamón, Puerto Rico
Roberto Pérez	55	C	23 December 1988 (aged 28)	(United States) Cleveland Indians	Major League Baseball	Mayagüez, Puerto Rico
René Rivera	44	C	31 July 1983 (aged 33)	(United States) New York Mets	Major League Baseball	Bayamón, Puerto Rico
Javier Báez	9	IF	1 December 1992 (aged 24)	(United States) Chicago Cubs	Major League Baseball	Bayamón, Puerto Rico
Carlos Correa	1	IF	22 September 1994 (aged 22)	(United States) Houston Astros	Major League Baseball	Santa Isabel, Puerto Rico
Francisco Lindor	12	IF	14 November 1993 (aged 23)	(United States) Cleveland Indians	Major League Baseball	Caguas, Puerto Rico
T. J. Rivera	5	IF	27 October 1988 (aged 28)	(United States) New York Mets	Major League Baseball	(United States) The Bronx, New York
Kennys Vargas	20	IF	1 August 1990 (aged 26)	(United States) Minnesota Twins	Major League Baseball	Canóvanas, Puerto Rico
Carlos Beltrán	15	OF	24 April 1977 (aged 39)	(United States) Houston Astros	Major League Baseball	Manatí, Puerto Rico
Reymond Fuentes	3	OF	12 February 1991 (aged 26)	(United States) Arizona Diamondbacks (minors)	Minor League Baseball	(United States) Orlando, Florida
Ángel Pagán	16	OF	2 July 1981 (aged 35)			Río Piedras, Puerto Rico
Eddie Rosario	17	OF	28 September 1991 (aged 25)	(United States) Minnesota Twins	Major League Baseball	Guayama, Puerto Rico
Mike Avilés	14	U	13 March 1981 (aged 35)			(United States) New York City
Enrique Hernández	7	U	24 August 1991 (aged 25)	(United States) Los Angeles Dodgers	Major League Baseball	San Juan, Puerto Rico

=== Venezuela ===
Manager
(Venezuela) (13) Omar Vizquel
Coaches
(23) Rouglas Odor, (26) Roberto Espinoza, (31) Carlos Subero, (16) Carlos García, (6) Eddie Pérez, (25) Henry Blanco, (35) Jesús Flores, (22) Omar Lopez

Player	No.	Pos.	DOB and age	Team	League	Birthplace
José Alvarado	51	P	21 May 1995 (aged 21)	(United States) Tampa Bay Rays	Major League Baseball	Maracaibo, Venezuela
José Álvarez*	48	P	6 May 1989 (aged 27)	(United States) Los Angeles Angels	Major League Baseball	Barcelona, Venezuela
Omar Bencomo	40	P	10 February 1989 (aged 28)	(Venezuela) Bravos de Margarita	Liga Venezolana de Béisbol Profesional	Valencia, Venezuela
Silvino Bracho	18	P	17 July 1992 (aged 24)	(United States) Arizona Diamondbacks	Major League Baseball	Maracaibo, Venezuela
Leonel Campos**	44	P	28 December 1987 (aged 29)	(Canada) Toronto Blue Jays (minors)	Minor League Baseball	Valera, Venezuela
José Castillo*	66	P	10 January 1996 (aged 21)	(United States) San Diego Padres (minors)	Minor League Baseball	Valencia, Venezuela
Jhoulys Chacín	45	P	7 January 1988 (aged 29)	(United States) San Diego Padres	Major League Baseball	Maracaibo, Venezuela
Jeanmar Gómez	–	P	10 February 1988 (aged 29)	(United States) Philadelphia Phillies	Major League Baseball	Caracas, Venezuela
Deolis Guerra	54	P	17 April 1989 (aged 27)	(United States) Los Angeles Angels	Major League Baseball	San Felix, Venezuela
Félix Hernández	34	P	8 April 1986 (aged 30)	(United States) Seattle Mariners	Major League Baseball	Valencia, Venezuela
Gregory Infante**	50	P	10 July 1987 (aged 29)	(Venezuela) Tiburones de La Guaira	Liga Venezolana de Béisbol Profesional	Caracas, Venezuela
Wil Ledezma	49	P	21 January 1981 (aged 36)	(Venezuela) Caribes de Anzoátegui	Liga Venezolana de Béisbol Profesional	Guárico, Venezuela
Arcenio León**	39	P	22 September 1986 (aged 30)	(United States) Detroit Tigers (minors)	Minor League Baseball	Maracaibo, Venezuela
Jhondaniel Medina**	32	P	8 February 1993 (aged 24)	(United States) Chicago Cubs (minors)	Minor League Baseball	Maracay, Venezuela
Franklin Morales**	47	P	24 January 1986 (aged 31)	(Venezuela) Leones del Caracas	Liga Venezolana de Béisbol Profesional	San Juan de los Morros, Venezuela
Martín Pérez	33	P	4 April 1991 (aged 25)	(United States) Texas Rangers	Major League Baseball	Guanare, Venezuela
Yusmeiro Petit	36	P	22 November 1984 (aged 32)	(United States) Los Angeles Angels (minors)	Minor League Baseball	Maracaibo, Venezuela
Edubray Ramos**	–	P	19 December 1992 (aged 24)	(United States) Philadelphia Phillies	Major League Baseball	Caracas, Venezuela
Eduardo Rodríguez**	52	P	7 April 1993 (aged 23)	(United States) Boston Red Sox	Major League Baseball	Valencia, Venezuela
Francisco Rodríguez	57	P	7 January 1982 (aged 35)	(United States) Detroit Tigers	Major League Baseball	Caracas, Venezuela
Bruce Rondón	43	P	9 December 1990 (aged 26)	(United States) Detroit Tigers	Major League Baseball	Valencia, Venezuela
Héctor Rondón**	56	P	26 February 1988 (aged 29)	(United States) Chicago Cubs	Major League Baseball	Guatire, Venezuela
Robert Suárez	30	P	1 March 1991 (aged 26)	(Japan) Fukuoka SoftBank Hawks	Nippon Professional Baseball	Bolívar, Venezuela
Robinson Chirinos	28	C	5 June 1984 (aged 32)	(United States) Texas Rangers	Major League Baseball	Punto Fijo, Venezuela
Salvador Pérez	15	C	10 May 1990 (aged 26)	(United States) Kansas City Royals	Major League Baseball	Valencia, Venezuela
Jose Altuve	27	IF	6 May 1990 (aged 26)	(United States) Houston Astros	Major League Baseball	Maracay, Venezuela
Miguel Cabrera	24	IF	18 April 1983 (aged 33)	(United States) Detroit Tigers	Major League Baseball	Maracay, Venezuela
Alcides Escobar	2	IF	16 December 1986 (aged 30)	(United States) Kansas City Royals	Major League Baseball	La Sabana, Venezuela
Víctor Martínez	41	IF	23 December 1978 (aged 38)	(United States) Detroit Tigers	Major League Baseball	Bolívar, Venezuela
Rougned Odor	12	IF	3 February 1994 (aged 23)	(United States) Texas Rangers	Major League Baseball	Maracaibo, Venezuela
Hernán Pérez	21	IF	26 March 1991 (aged 25)	(United States) Milwaukee Brewers	Major League Baseball	Zamora, Venezuela
Martín Prado	14	IF	27 October 1983 (aged 33)	(United States) Miami Marlins	Major League Baseball	Maracay, Venezuela
Yangervis Solarte	10	IF	7 July 1987 (aged 29)	(United States) San Diego Padres	Major League Baseball	Valencia, Venezuela
Carlos González	5	OF	17 October 1985 (aged 31)	(United States) Colorado Rockies	Major League Baseball	Maracaibo, Venezuela
Odubel Herrera	37	OF	29 December 1991 (aged 25)	(United States) Philadelphia Phillies	Major League Baseball	San José de Guanipa, Venezuela
Ender Inciarte	11	OF	29 October 1990 (aged 26)	(United States) Atlanta Braves	Major League Baseball	Maracaibo, Venezuela

== Notes ==
- [* Designated pitchers pool, on active roster]
- [** Designated pitchers pool, not on active roster]

Preceded by 2013	World Baseball Classic rosters	Succeeded by 2023
