= Javier Ortiz =

Javier Ortiz may refer to:

- Xavier Ortiz, Mexican actor and singer
- Javier Ortiz (outfielder) (born 1963), former American Major League Baseball player
- Javier Ortiz (pitcher) (born 1979), Colombian baseball pitcher
