= Mauricio Ramos =

Mauricio Ramos may refer to:

- Mauricio Ramos (Bolivian footballer) (born 1969), Bolivian football midfielder
- Maurício Ramos (Brazilian footballer) (born 1985), Brazilian football centre-back
- Mauricio Ramos (baseball) (born 1992), Colombian baseball player
