= Oduber =

Oduber is a surname. Notable people with the surname include:

- Dangui Oduber (born 1978), Aruban Politician, Minister of Tourism and Public Health in the Second Wever-Croes Cabinet
- Marjorie Elliott de Oduber (1925–2015), Canadian-born Costa Rican musician and public figure
- Marvin Oduber (born 1976), Dutch financial advisor and serial entrepreneur
- Nelson Oduber (born 1947), Aruban politician, the 2nd Prime Minister of Aruba
- Randolph Oduber (born 1989), professional baseball outfielder
- Ryan Oduber (born 1997), Arubian professional baseball baseball pitcher
- Daniel Oduber Quirós (1921–1991), Costa Rican politician, lawyer, philosopher, poet, and essayist

== See also ==
- Daniel Oduber Airport or Guanacaste Airport, one of four international airports in Costa Rica
- Dr. Horacio E. Oduber Hospital, 320-bed Catholic hospital on the island of Aruba
- Boduberu
