= Lu Chao =

Lu Chao may refer to:

- Lu Chao (artist), Chinese artist
- Chao Lu (boxer) (born 1970), Chinese boxer
- Lu Chao (baseball) (born 1988), Chinese baseball pitcher
- Lü Chao (1890–1951), military and political figure
