= Mike Reeves =

Mike Reeves may refer to:

- Mike Reeves (footballer)
- Mike Reeves (baseball)
