= Lim Jung-woo =

Lim Jung-woo may refer to:

- Lim Jung-woo (field hockey) (born 1978), field hockey player
- Lim Jung-woo (baseball) (born 1991)
