= Luo Guo-long =

Taiwanese baseball player

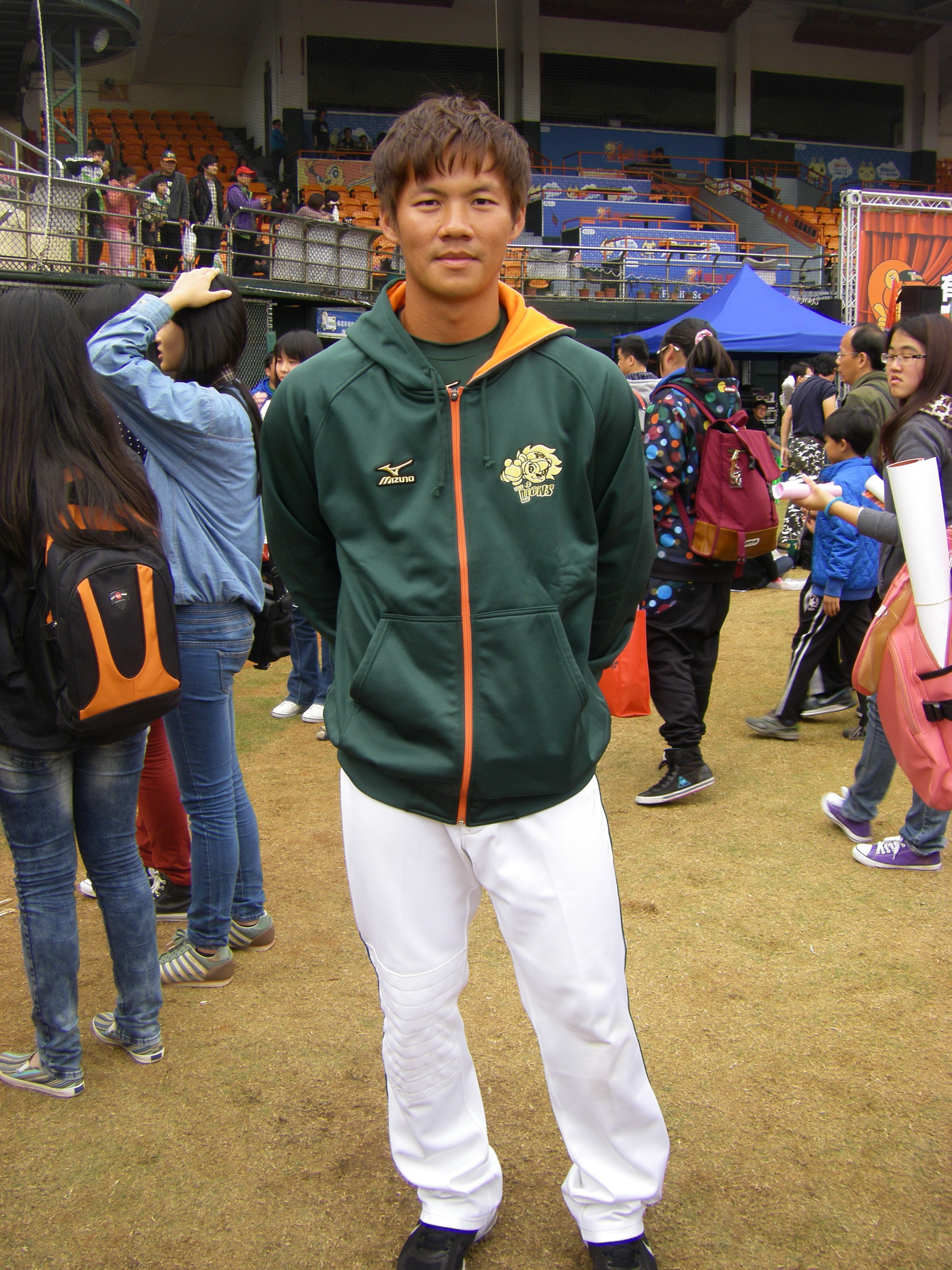
- Luo with the Uni-President 7-Eleven Lions
- Outfielder
- Born: 24 June 1989 (age 36); Guangfu, Hualien, Hualien County, Taiwan
- Batted: Right Threw: Right

CPBL debut
- May 24, 2014, for the Uni-President Lions

Last CPBL appearance
- November 20, 2021, for the Uni-President Lions

CPBL statistics
- Batting average: .279
- Home runs: 30
- Runs batted in: 185
- Stats at Baseball Reference

Teams
- Uni-President Lions (2014–2021)

Career highlights and awards
- Taiwan Series champion (2020)

Luo Guo-long (born 24 June 1989) is a Taiwanese former professional baseball outfielder. He played in the Chinese Professional Baseball League (CPBL) for the Uni-President Lions from 2014 to 2021. He is the younger brother of Kuo-Hui Kao.

He represented Taiwan at the 2011 and 2013 World Port Tournaments and the 2017 World Baseball Classic.

Luo began his career with the Uni-President 7-Eleven Lions in 2014 and has played for the club through the 2020 season.
