= Chen Yanpeng =

Chinese baseball player (born 1996)

- Outfielder
- Born: May 26, 1996 (age 30); Guangdong, China
- Bats: Right Throws: Right

Chen Yanpeng (born May 26, 1996) is a Chinese baseball outfielder who represented China at the 2017 World Baseball Classic.
