= Huang Sheng-hsiung =

Taiwanese baseball player

- Pitcher
- Born: 3 December 1990 (age 35); Taitung County, Taiwan
- Bats: Left Throws: Left

CPBL debut
- March 23, 2014, for the EDA Rhinos

CPBL statistics
- Win–loss record: 13–21
- Earned run average: 4.94
- Strikeouts: 220
- Stats at Baseball Reference

Teams
- EDA Rhinos (2014–2016); Fubon Guardians (2017–2018)

Huang Sheng-hsiung (born 3 December 1990) is a Taiwanese baseball pitcher. He was drafted by the EDA Rhinos with the third overall pick in the 2013 CPBL draft.

Huang represented Taiwan at the 2012 Haarlem Baseball Week, 2014 Haarlem Baseball Week, 2012 Italian Baseball Week, 2013 East Asian Games and 2017 World Baseball Classic.
