= Wang Menghao =

Chinese baseball player

Sichuan Dragons
- Pitcher
- Born: September 25, 1992 (age 33)
- Bats: Right Throws: Right

Wang Menghao (born September 25, 1992) is a Chinese baseball pitcher who plays with the Sichuan Dragons in the China Baseball League.

Wang represented China at the 2017 World Baseball Classic.
