= Ju Kwon =

South Korean-Chinese baseball player

KT Wiz – No. 38
- Pitcher
- Born: May 31, 1995 (age 30); Jilin Province, China
- Bats: Right Throws: Right

KBO debut
- May 23, 2015, for the KT Wiz

KBO statistics (through May 30, 2024)
- Win–loss record: 34–39
- Earned run average: 5.18
- Strikeouts: 345
- Stats at Baseball Reference

Teams
- KT Wiz (2015–present)

Ju Kwon (also known as Joo Kwan, born May 31, 1995) is a South Korean-Chinese baseball pitcher who plays with the KT Wiz in the KBO League.

Ju was born in the Jilin province to a Chinese father and a Korean mother in 1995.

Ju became a South Korean citizen in 2007 and played youth baseball in South Korea.

On May 27, 2016, he recorded nine scoreless innings, four hits, and four strikeouts against Nexen, recording his first complete victory in his debut.

Ju represented China at the 2017 World Baseball Classic. He faced criticism from fans for his decision which he said hurt him deeply.

Ju announced prior to the 2023 World Baseball Classic that, while he would play for China, he would not pitch against South Korea if the two teams faced each other. He further said that he would have preferred to play for South Korea if he had been selected.
