= Jefferson Delgado =

Cuban baseball player (born 1977)

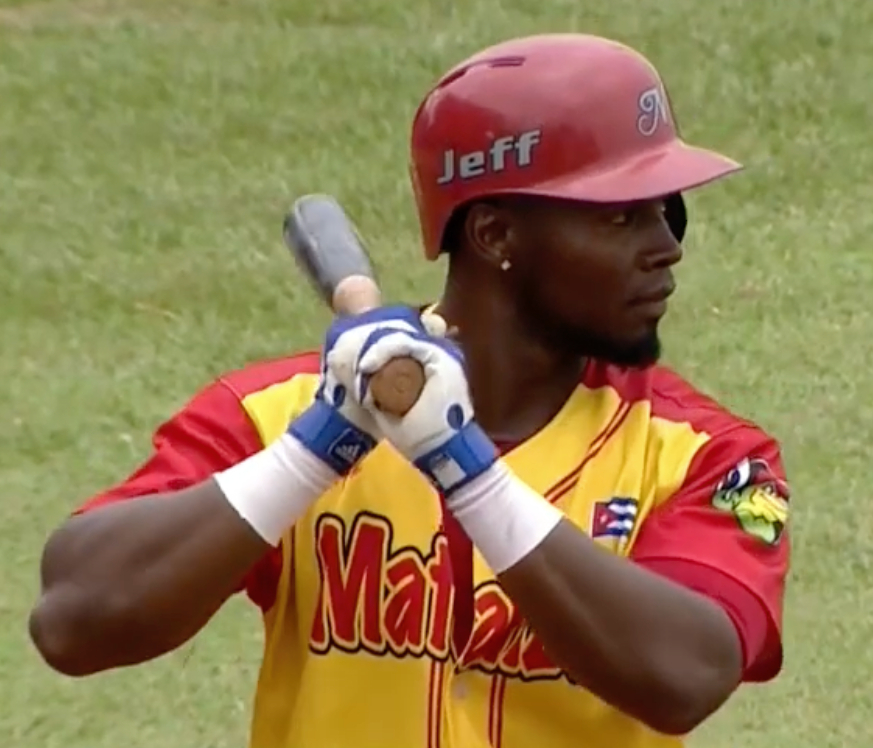
- Delgado in 2022
- Infielder
- Born: 30 November 1982 (age 43); Santo Domingo, Villa Clara Province, Cuba
- Bats: Right Throws: Right

Jefferson Delgado Castañeda (born 30 November 1982) is a Cuban retired baseball infielder. Delgado played 15 seasons in the Cuban National Series, most of them with the Cocodrilos de Matanzas. He was part of the Cuban team that participated in the 2017 World Baseball Classic.

== Early life ==
Delgado was born on 30 November 1982 in Santo Domingo, Villa Clara Province, Cuba. As a schoolboy, Delgado was not initially considered by talent scouts and coaches for youth teams. He later had to take on other jobs while pursuing his baseball career.

In 2000, he was selected to represent the Villa Clara provincial team. Later, he moved to Varadero in Matanzas Province, where he worked as a secondary school physical education instructor.

== Career ==
Delgado made his Cuban National Series in November 2004 with the Cocodrilos de Matanzas during the 2004–05 Cuban National Series. That season he appeared in 55 games, recording a .297/.337/.389 batting line.

In 2009, Delgado was transferred to the Naranjas de Villa Clara, where he spent two seasons until 2011. In 2014, he returned to play with Matanzas. He split the 2018–19 season between Matanzas and the Tigres de Ciego de Ávila. He last played in the Cuban National Series during the 2021–22 season.

In September 2022, Delgado left Cuba, citing the low salary he received as a baseball player, which he said amounted to 3,500 Cuban pesos. He subsequently settled in Jacksonville, Florida. He began working for an electrical panel company and continued playing amateur baseball.

== International career ==
In 2017, Delgado was selected to represent Cuba at the 2017 World Baseball Classic. He appeared in five games, recording nine at bats, two hits, one double, and a .222/.222/.333 batting line.
