= Frank DeJiulio =

American baseball player (born 1989)

Frank De Jiulio, Jr.
- Pitcher
- Born: August 22, 1989 (age 36); Fort Lauderdale, Florida, U.S.
- Bats: Right Throws: Right
- Stats at Baseball Reference

Frank M. De Jiulio, Jr (born August 22, 1989) is an American former professional baseball pitcher. He attended Daytona Beach Community College and the University of Tampa.

== Career ==
De Jiulio was selected three different times in the Major League Baseball draft. In the 44th round of the 2009 Draft by the Chicago Cubs, in the 45th round of the 2010 Draft by the Cleveland Indians and in the 38th round of the 2011 Draft by the Los Angeles Angels of Anaheim.

De Jiulio played in the Angels farm system in 2011 and 2012, playing in a combined 48 games (15 starts) with a 6–9 record and 7.21 ERA. After his release by the Angels, he played in the United League Baseball for the Edinburg Roadrunners (2013), Frontier League for the Frontier Greys (2014), and Atlantic League of Professional Baseball for the Long Island Ducks (2015–2016) and Bridgeport Bluefish (2016). He re-signed with Bridgeport for the 2017 season. On November 1, 2017, DeJiulio was drafted by the York Revolution in the Bridgeport Bluefish dispersal draft. On February 7, 2018, he signed with the York Revolution for the 2018 season. He became a free agent following the 2018 season.

De Jiulio was selected as a member of the Italy national baseball team at the 2017 World Baseball Classic.
