= Guiyuan Xu =

Chinese baseball player (born 1996)

Xu Guiyuan
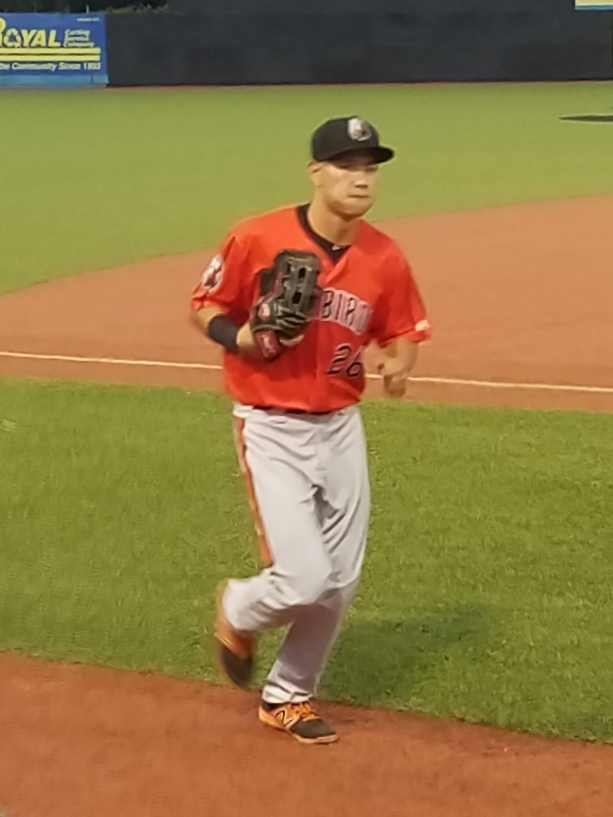
- Xu with the Aberdeen IronBirds in 2018
- First baseman/Outfielder
- Born: January 29, 1996 (age 30); Puning, Guangdong, China
- Bats: Left Throws: Left
- Stats at Baseball Reference

Xu Guiyuan (simplified Chinese: 许桂源; traditional Chinese: 許桂源; pinyin: Xǔ Guìyuán; born January 29, 1996) is a Chinese former professional baseball first baseman and outfielder. He became the first player signed out of MLB's developmental center in China when he signed with the Baltimore Orioles organization in 2015.

== Career ==
=== Baltimore Orioles ===
Xu signed with the Baltimore Orioles as a free agent on July 20, 2015 from the MLB Development Center in Wuxi, Jiangsu, China, making him the first player from one of MLB's three development centers in China to sign with a major league team.

In 2016, Xu made his professional debut with the Gulf Coast League Orioles, where he slashed .247/.271/.284 with no home runs and nine RBI in 33 games. Xu returned to the GCL Orioles in 2017, playing in 15 games and batting .180/.267/.256 with no home runs, seven RBI, and three stolen bases.

In 2018, Xu was promoted to the Low-A Aberdeen IronBirds, where he spent the entirety of the season. In 25 games for the IronBirds, he hit .167/.250/.222 with no home runs and five RBI. After the 2018 season, he signed with the Auckland Tuatara of the Australian Baseball League for the 2018/19 season.

On March 25, 2019, Xu was released by the Orioles organization.

=== Kōchi Fighting Dogs ===
On May 27, 2019, Xu signed with the Kōchi Fighting Dogs of the Shikoku Island League Plus.

== International ==
Xu played in the 2017 World Baseball Classic with China.
