= Erling Moreno =

Colombian baseball player (born 1997)

Free agent
- Pitcher
- Born: January 13, 1997 (age 29); Cartagena, Colombia
- Bats: Right Throws: Right
- Stats at Baseball Reference

Erling Enrique Moreno Álvarez (born January 13, 1997) is a Colombian professional baseball pitcher who is a free agent.

== Career ==
Moreno signed with the Chicago Cubs as an international free agent on July 2, 2013. After signing, Moreno was assigned to the Venezuelan Summer League Cubs, and after throwing three scoreless innings in his debut for them, he was reassigned to the Dominican Summer League Cubs where he finished the season, going 0-1 with a 1.08 ERA in 8 1/3 innings pitched. Moreno spent 2015 with the Arizona League Cubs where he posted a 1.93 ERA in 4 2/3 innings pitched. In 2016, he split time between the AZL Cubs and the Eugene Emeralds. In 62 1/3 innings pitched between both teams, Moreno pitched to a 4-3 record, 1.88 ERA, and a .90 WHIP. He spent 2017 with the South Bend Cubs where he posted a 2-4 record with a 4.22 ERA in a career high 64 innings pitched.

Moreno did not play in a game in 2020 due to the cancellation of the minor league season because of the COVID-19 pandemic. On November 2, 2020, Moreno elected free agency.

== International career ==
Moreno was on Colombia's roster for the 2017 World Baseball Classic.
