= Édgar García (baseball, born 1987) =

Dominican baseball player

Free agent
- Pitcher
- Born: September 20, 1987 (age 38); Las Matas de Farfan, San Juan Province, Dominican Republic
- Bats: Right Throws: Right
- Stats at Baseball Reference

Édgar Alberto García (born September 20, 1987) is a Dominican professional baseball pitcher who is currently a free agent.

== Career ==
=== Philadelphia Phillies ===
He began his career in 2005 at 17 years old in the Philadelphia Phillies system, remaining there until 2010, reaching as high as the Double-A Reading Phillies in 2008. He played 2010 with the Clearwater Threshers and became a free agent after the season.

=== Kansas City Royals ===
On June 14, 2011, García signed a minor league contract with the Kansas City Royals organization. He split the season between the advanced Single-A Wilmington Blue Rocks and the Double-A Northwest Arkansas Naturals. He was assigned to the Idaho Falls Chukars for the 2012 season.

=== El Paso Diablos ===
García signed with the El Paso Diablos of the American Association of Independent Professional Baseball partway through the 2012 season, appearing in 4 games for the club, allowing 21 runs in 20.2 innings.

=== Philadelphia Phillies (second stint) ===
On December 19, 2012, García signed a minor league contract with the Philadelphia Phillies, the team who originally signed him. García was assigned to Reading to begin the season but was released on April 27, 2013.

=== Arizona Diamondbacks ===
On December 16, 2014, García signed a minor league contract with the Arizona Diamondbacks organization. He split the 2015 season with the Double-A Mobile BayBears and the Triple-A Reno Aces. He elected free agency on November 6, 2015 and re-signed with the Diamondbacks on a minor league contract on November 19. On May 14, 2016, García pitched a complete-game shutout for the Mobile BayBears. García split 2016 with Mobile and Reno and elected free agency after the season.

=== Sultanes de Monterrey ===
On March 30, 2017, García signed with the Sultanes de Monterrey of the Mexican League. On April 13, 2017, he was released.

=== Piratas de Campeche ===
On June 19, 2017, García signed with the Piratas de Campeche of the Mexican League. On January 4, 2018, he was released by the team.

== International career ==
He represented the Dominican in the 2017 World Baseball Classic. In the 2017 regular season, he pitched in the Mexican League.
