= Omar Bencomo =

Venezuelan baseball player (born 1989)

- Pitcher
- Born: February 10, 1989 (age 37); Valencia, Venezuela
- Bats: Right Throws: Right
- Stats at Baseball Reference

Omar David Bencomo Lamas (born February 10, 1989) is a Venezuelan former professional baseball pitcher who is a free agent. He was signed by the Tampa Bay Rays in 2007 as an undrafted free agent.

== Career ==
=== Tampa Bay Rays ===
Bencomo signed with the Tampa Bay Rays as an undrafted free agent on January 29, 2007. He made his professional debut with the VSL Devil Rays, and played for the club in 2008 as well. In 2009, he played for the rookie ball Princeton Rays, pitching to a 2-1 record and 3.47 ERA in 9 appearances. He spent the 2010 season in Low-A with the Hudson Valley Renegades, recording a 1-3 record and 4.60 ERA with 41 strikeouts. In 2011, he played for the Single-A Bowling Green Hot Rods, registering a 4-5 record and 3.97 ERA in 38 games. He became a free agent after the 2011 season. Bencomo did not play in affiliated ball in 2012 and played only in the Venezuelan Winter League in 2013 and 2014

=== Wichita Wingnuts ===
On December 8, 2014, Bencomo signed with the Wichita Wingnuts of the American Association of Independent Professional Baseball for the 2015 season. Bencomo pitched to a 4-1 record and 3.81 ERA in 9 appearances for Wichita.

=== Laredo Lemurs ===
On June 4, 2015, Bencomo was traded to the Laredo Lemurs of the American Association of Professional Baseball in exchange for Matt Padgett. He recorded a 2-0 record and 1.93 ERA in 4 games for Laredo, including a victory against his former team.

=== Minnesota Twins ===
On August 7, 2015, Bencomo signed a minor league contract with the Minnesota Twins organization. He finished the season with the High-A Fort Myers Miracle, and recorded a 1.50 ERA in 3 games. In 2016, Bencomo split the year between the Triple-A Rochester Red Wings and the Double-A Chattanooga Lookouts, registering a 7-7 record and 3.74 ERA between the two teams. On November 7, 2016, he elected free agency.

=== Miami Marlins ===
On February 8, 2017, Bencomo signed a minor league contract with the Miami Marlins organization and was selected as a member of the Venezuela national baseball team at the 2017 World Baseball Classic. He split the season between the Triple-A New Orleans Baby Cakes and the Double-A Jacksonville Jumbo Shrimp, pitching to a 5-6 record and 4.95 ERA in 22 appearances. He elected free agency following the season on November 6.

=== Minnesota Twins (second stint) ===
On January 19, 2018, Bencomo signed a minor league deal to return to the Minnesota Twins organization. He split the season between the Triple-A Rochester Red Wings and Double-A Chattanooga Lookouts, accumulating a 9-6 record and 3.45 ERA between the two teams. Bencomo elected free agency following the season on November 2.

=== Tecolotes de los Dos Laredos ===
On January 19, 2019, Bencomo signed a minor league contract with the Baltimore Orioles organization. He was released prior to the start of the season on March 20.

On April 3, 2019, Bencomo signed with the Tecolotes de los Dos Laredos of the Mexican League. In two starts for Dos Laredos, he struggled to a 1-1 record and 6.97 ERA with eight strikeouts across 10 1/3 innings pitched. Bencomo was released by the Tecolotes on April 18.

=== Sultanes de Monterrey ===
On April 22, 2019, Bencomo signed with the Sultanes de Monterrey of the Mexican League. In 11 games for Monterrey, Bencomo pitched to a 3-2 record and 4.87 ERA with 20 strikeouts and one save across 40 2/3 innings pitched.

=== Bravos de León ===
On July 2, 2019, Bencomo was traded to the Bravos de León of the Mexican League. In three starts for León, Bencomo posted a 1-0 record and 2.93 ERA with nine strikeouts across 15 1/3 innings pitched. Bencomo was released by the Bravos on July 29.

On February 19, 2020, Bencomo signed with the Sugar Land Skeeters of the Atlantic League of Professional Baseball. He did not play a game for the team due to the cancellation of the ALPB season because of the COVID-19 pandemic and became a free agent after the year.
