= Lim Jung-woo (baseball) =

South Korean baseball player (born 1991)

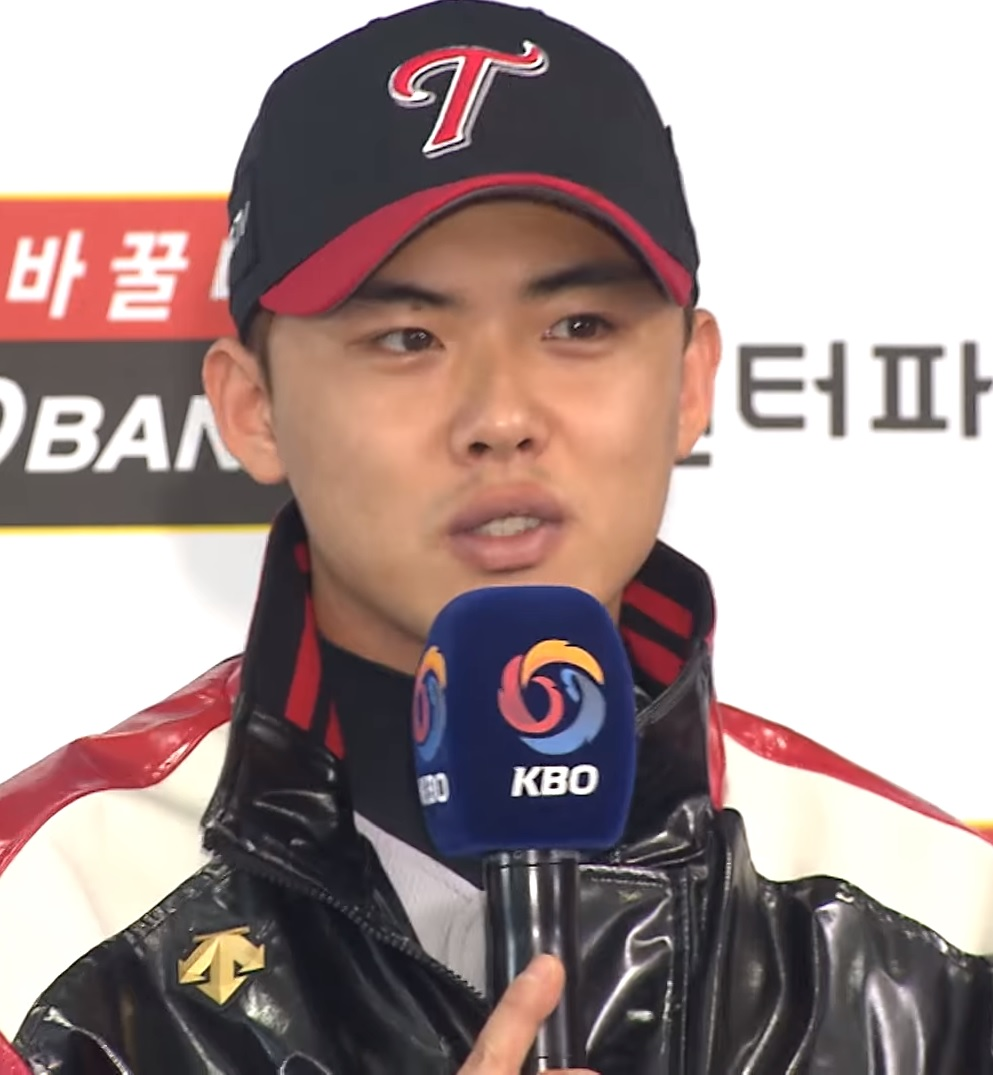

LG Twins – No. 20
- Relief pitcher
- Born: April 2, 1991 (age 35); Iksan, North Jeolla
- Bats: Right Throws: Right

KBO debut
- September 9, 2011, for the SK Wyverns

KBO statistics (through 2018 season)
- Win–loss record: 14–25
- Earned run average: 4.50
- Strikeouts: 327
- Holds: 7
- Saves: 34
- Stats at Baseball Reference

Teams
- SK Wyverns (2011); LG Twins (2012–present)

- Lim Jung-woo
- Hangul: 임정우
- Hanja: 林廷宇
- RR: Im Jeongu
- MR: Im Chŏngu

Lim Jung-woo (born April 2, 1991) is a South Korean professional baseball pitcher for the LG Twins of the KBO League.
