= Kuo-Hui Kao =

Taiwanese baseball player (born 1985)

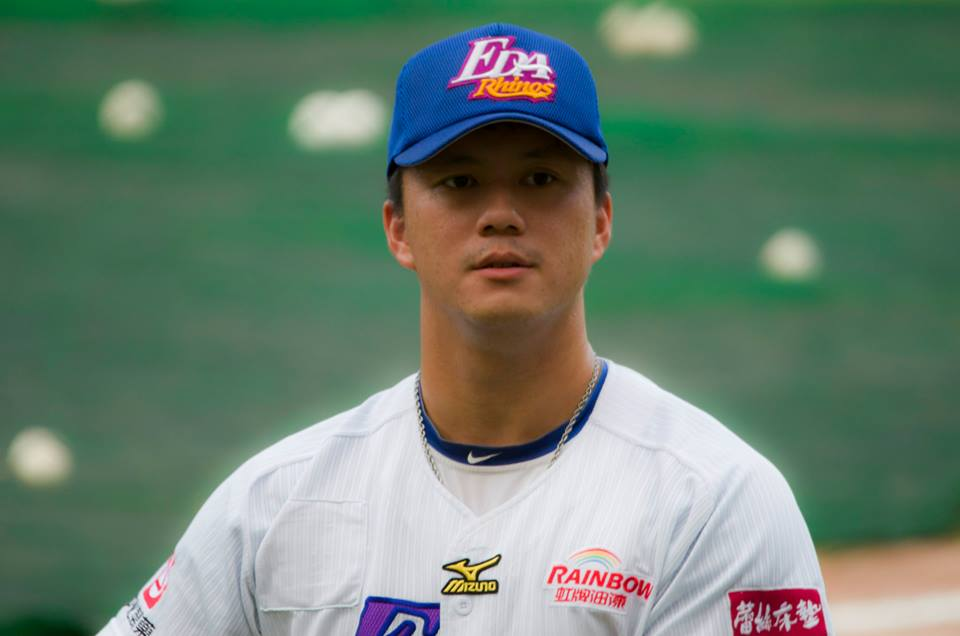
- Left fielder
- Born: September 26, 1985 (age 40); Hualien County, Taiwan
- Batted: Right Threw: Right

CPBL debut
- March 24, 2013, for the EDA Rhinos

Last CPBL appearance
- October 14, 2023, for the Fubon Guardians

CPBL statistics
- Batting average: .290
- Home runs: 171
- Runs batted in: 555
- Stats at Baseball Reference

Teams
- EDA Rhinos/Fubon Guardians (2013–2023)

Career highlights and awards
- 3× CPBL home run champion (2014, 2015, 2016); Taiwan Series champion (2016)

Kuo-Hui Kao (Chinese: 高國輝; also known as Kuo-Hui Lo 羅國輝; born September 26, 1985, in Hualien County, Taiwan) is a Taiwanese former professional baseball outfielder. He played in the Chinese Professional Baseball League (CPBL) for the Fubon Guardians. He graduated from Kao-Yuan Technical High School in Kaohsiung County, Taiwan in June 2003. He attended Taipei Physical Education College in Taipei City, Taiwan. for Chinese Taipei in the 2005 World Cup in the Netherlands. He was on the provisional roster for Chinese Tapei for the inaugural World Baseball Classic.

Lo is able to generate average power and get good wood on the bat because of a fundamental level swing, quick wrists, and strong hips which help generate good bat speed and torque. As a baserunner, Lo shows good instincts but does not rely on his speed. Defensively, Lo covers adequate range in the outfield.

== Professional career ==
=== Seattle Mariners ===
On July 28, 2005, the Seattle Mariners announced that they had signed Lo to a minor league contract. He was said to have wowed scouts from numerous organizations with his combination of power and speed. Lo participated in 2005 Arizona Fall League. He made his pro debut in 2006 with the Short-season Everett AquaSox. He hit .435 during a six-game hitting streak from June 23 to 28. He hit .414 in seven games on the road, compared to .138 in six games at home. He was promoted to the Single-A Wisconsin Timber Rattlers on July 8. Lo recorded a season-high seven-game hit streak, hitting .370 from July 8 to 16. He stole a base in 13 of his 29 games he appeared, including three multi-stolen base games. He was placed on the disabled list with a right calf strain on August 21.

In 2007, he appeared in 104 games with Wisconsin. He finished second among all Mariners farmhands with 32 stolen bases. He had a season-high 12-game hit streak, hitting .349 from May 8 to 19. He hit .330 with 14 runs, seven extra-base hits and 16 RBIs in May. He had a stolen base in four consecutive games twice, while also recording two steals in a game three times. Lo hit .600 with five multi-hit games, seven runs scored, three extra-base hits and four RBIs during a seven-game hit streak from June 13 to 25. He recorded 21 multi-hit games, including three three-hit games and four four-hit games.

He spent the season with the Single–A High Desert Mavericks in 2008, appearing in games in all three outfield positions. He hit safely in 15 of 16 games, batting .385 with 16 runs, nine extra-base hits and 13 RBI from May 21 to June 27. He recorded 20 multi-hit games, including a season-high 4 hit game on July 24 against the Inland Empire 66ers.

He competed in the 2008 Summer Olympics. Lo played for the Mavericks in 2009. He primarily played left field. He hit .277 with 14 home runs and 70 RBI. In the next two years, Lo played between Single–A and Double–A. Several minor injuries held back his development. He didn't play any professional game in the entire 2012 due to leg fracture and severe ankle dislocation.

=== EDA Rhinos/Fubon Guardians ===
After his contract expired in the end of 2012, Lo came back to his hometown Taiwan and joined the newly formed EDA Rhinos of Chinese Professional Baseball League.

In 2015 season, Kuo-Hui Kao hit 39 home runs, which set the new record of most home runs in a single season of Chinese Professional Baseball League. (Former record was Tilson Brito's 33 home runs in the 2007 season.)

In 2016 season, Kuo-Hui Kao hit 34 home runs, and achieved home run titles in 3 seasons in a row during 2014 to 2016, its first time in CPBL's history. He helped EDA Rhinos win the championship of Taiwan Series in the same year.

Kao was in the Opening Day lineup for the Fubon Guardians in 2021, and hit .231/.284/.469 with 12 home runs and 42 RBI across 79 games.

Kao played in 38 games for the Guardians in 2023, batting .209/.281/.382 with four home runs and 14 RBI. On September 3, 2023, Kao announced that he would be retiring following the conclusion of the season.
