= Lu Chao (baseball) =

Chinese baseball player

Guangdong Leopards
- Pitcher
- Born: October 9, 1988 (age 37)
- Bats: Right Throws: Right

Lu Chao (born October 9, 1988) is a Chinese baseball pitcher who plays with the Guangdong Leopards in the China Baseball League.

Chao represented China at the 2017 World Baseball Classic.
