= Javier Ortiz (pitcher) =

Colombian baseball player

- Pitcher
- Born: November 28, 1979 (age 46); Cartagena, Colombia
- Bats: Right Throws: Right
- Stats at Baseball Reference

Javier Jesús Ortiz Ángulo (born November 28, 1979) is a Colombian professional baseball pitcher.He played for the Colombian Mayor League. He played in the minor league organizations of the New York Yankees and Chicago White Sox from 1997 to 2005. After that he played in independent ball in the Northern League and Golden Baseball League and in foreign leagues in Italy and Mexico. Currently married and living with the Cuban Quenia. His son Yalier and his stepdaughters Nathalia and Aynek

Ortiz was selected to the roster for the Colombia national baseball team at the 2006 Central American and Caribbean Games, 2010 South American Games, 2010 Pan American Games Qualifying Tournament, 2015 Pan American Games and 2017 World Baseball Classic.
