= Mauricio Ramos (baseball) =

Colombian baseball player (born 1992)

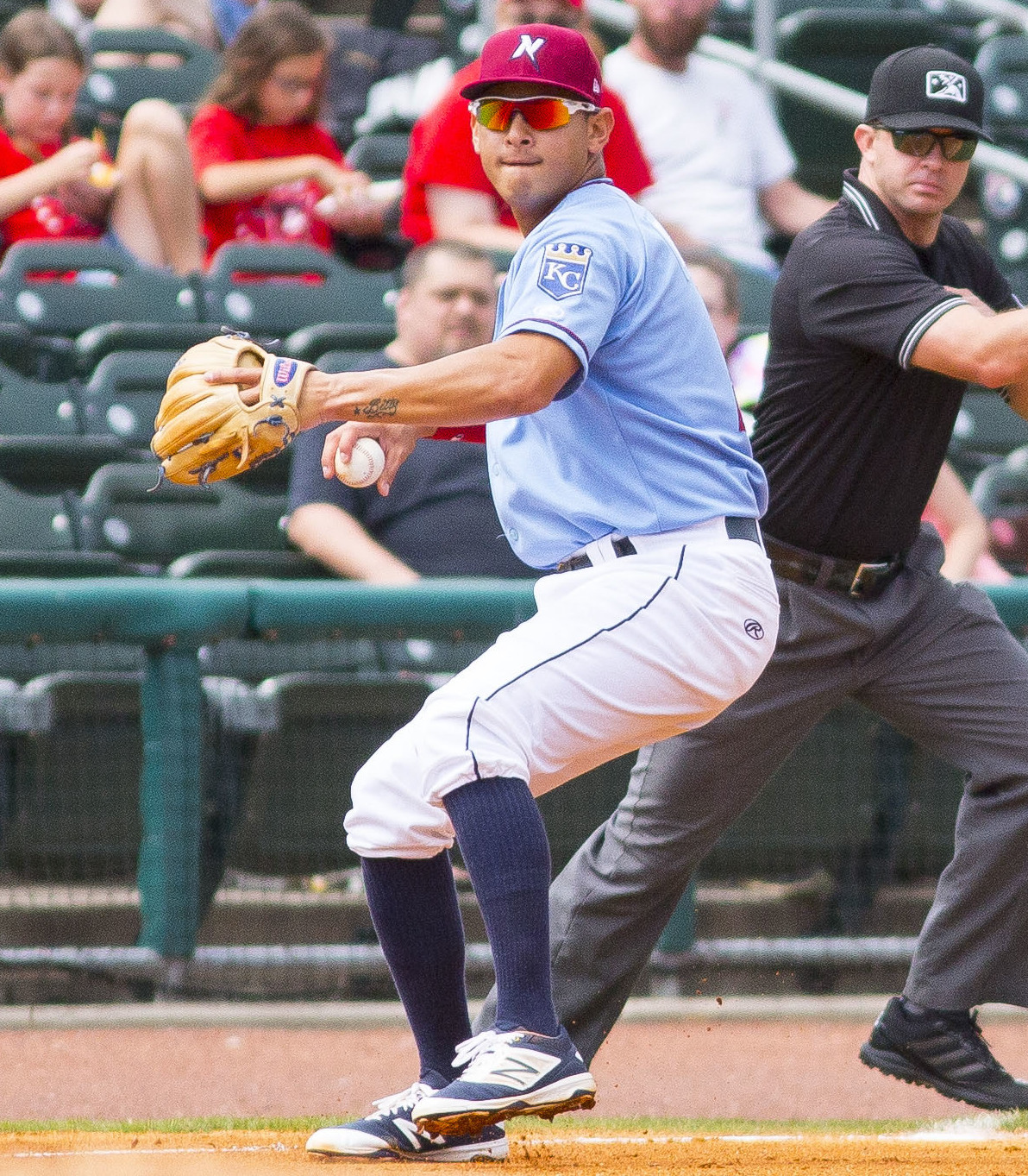
- Ramos with the Northwest Arkansas Naturals in 2016

Free agent
- Third baseman
- Born: February 2, 1992 (age 34); Cartagena, Colombia
- Bats: Right Throws: Right
- Stats at Baseball Reference

Mauricio (Garrido) Ramos (born February 2, 1992) is a Colombian professional baseball third baseman who is a free agent.

== Career ==
=== Kansas City Royals ===
Ramos was signed by the Kansas City Royals at 18 years old as an amateur free agent on November 20, 2010. He made his professional debut in 2011 with the Dominican Summer League Royals. Ramos spent the 2012 season with the rookie-level Arizona League Royals, playing in 48 games and batting .283/.332/.393 with two home runs and 31 RBI.

Ramos split the 2013 campaign between the rookie-level Idaho Falls Chukars and rookie-level Burlington Royals, hitting a cumulative .318/.351/.441 with one home run, 28 RBI, and two stolen bases across 58 total appearances. He made 109 appearances for the Single-A Lexington Legends during the 2014 season, batting .279/.335/.422 with nine home runs and 54 RBI. Ramos played in 123 games for the High-A Wilmington Blue Rocks in 2015, slashing .265/.313/.372 with eight home runs and 59 RBI.

In 2016, Ramos was a Texas League all-star and finished second in the league in hits and third in batting average. In 2017, Ramos played in 92 games for the Double–A Northwest Arkansas Naturals, hitting .258/.299/.388 with 11 home runs and 47 RBI. Ramos elected free agency following the season on November 6, 2017.

=== Sugar Land Skeeters ===
On April 26, 2018, Ramos signed with the Sugar Land Skeeters of the Atlantic League of Professional Baseball. He played in one game for the team, going 0-for-3 with two strikeouts. Ramos became a free agent following the season.

On February 19, 2020, Ramos signed with the Evansville Otters of the Frontier League. However, he did not play in a game for the team. On April 14, 2021, Ramos was released by the Otters.

== International career ==
Ramos was selected to the roster for the Colombia national baseball team at the 2017 World Baseball Classic.

== Personal life ==
As of 2019, he lived in Idaho Falls, Idaho.
