= Mike Reeves (baseball) =

Canadian baseball player (born 1990)

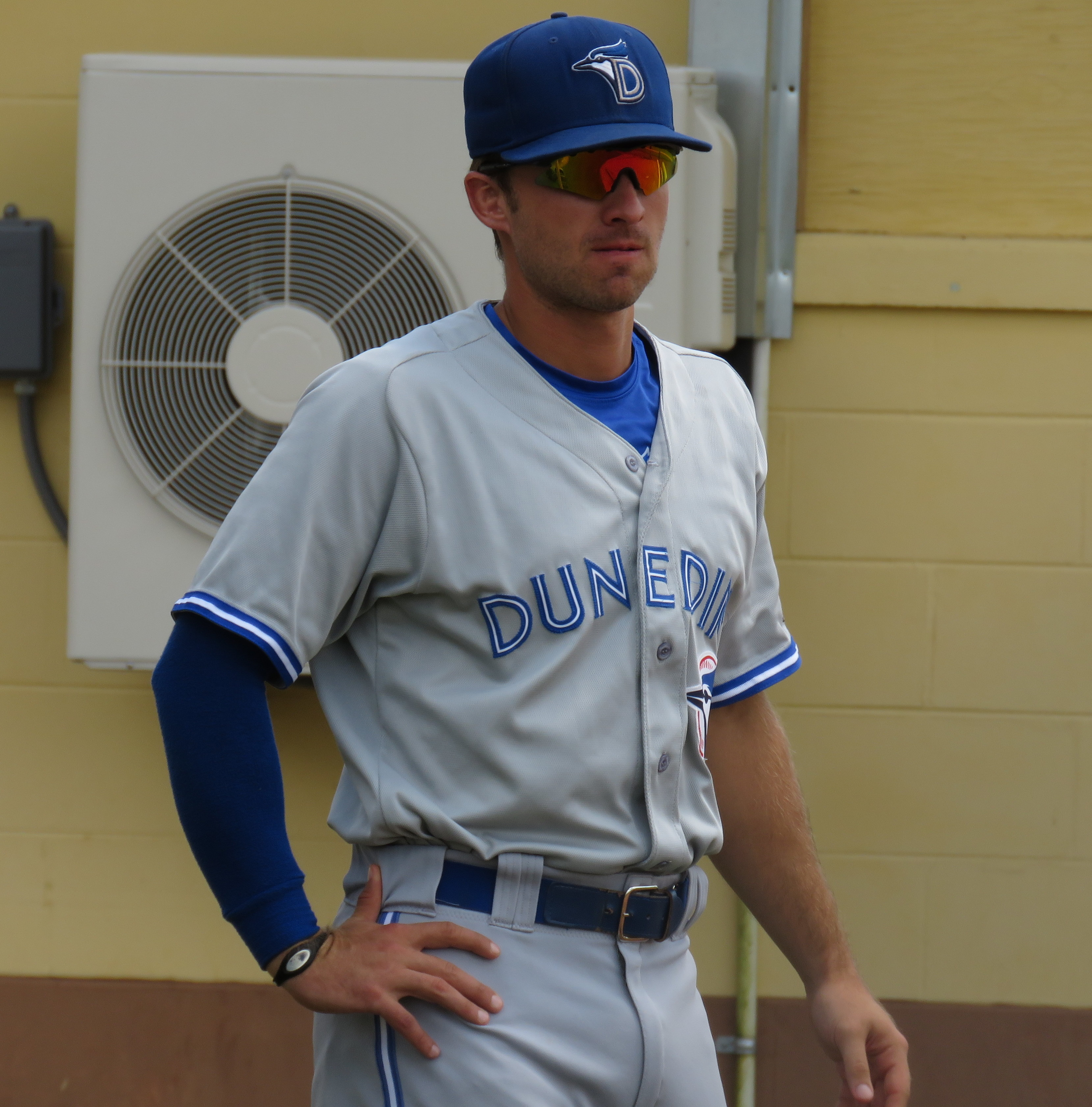
- Catcher
- Born: September 16, 1990 (age 35); Peterborough, Ontario, Canada
- Bats: Left Throws: Right
- Stats at Baseball Reference

Michael G. Reeves (born September 16, 1990) is a Canadian former professional baseball catcher.

== High school and college ==
Reeves attended St. Peter Catholic Secondary School in his home town of Peterborough, Ontario. He was selected in the 42nd round of the 2009 MLB draft by the Toronto Blue Jays, but did not sign. Reeves then attended Florida Gulf Coast University for four years, majoring in criminal justice. In his first season with the Eagles, Reeves batted .301 with two home runs and 21 runs batted in (RBI) in 27 games. He was named to Perfect Game Mid Season Standouts. The following year, Reeves split time at catcher and designated hitter, appearing in 48 games and hitting .314 with two home runs and 29 RBI. In the offseason, he played in 62 games for the La Crosse Loggers of the Northwoods League. As a junior, Reeves appeared in 55 games and batted .250 with 14 RBI. In his final collegiate season, Reeves hit .330 while starting all 57 games in the year, and was named to the College Sports Madness A-Sun All-Conference First Team.

== Professional career ==
Reeves was selected in the 21st round of the 2013 MLB draft by the Blue Jays, and was assigned to the Low-A Vancouver Canadians. In 55 games for Vancouver, Reeves hit .275 with one home run and 25 RBI. Reeves was named to the Northwest League All-Star Game, after leading the league in hitting through the first half. He split the 2014 season with the Vancouver Canadians, the Single-A Lansing Lugnuts, and the High-A Dunedin Blue Jays. In 63 total games played, Reeves batted .213 with one home run and 16 RBI. Reeves played for both Lansing and Dunedin in 2015 and struggled at the plate, hitting .206 with 21 RBI in 75 games. He was known for his defensive skills, throwing out 36% of attempted base stealers and only allowing 21 passed balls in a total of 2,202 1/3 innings played.

Reeves played the entire 2016 season with Dunedin, appearing in 53 games and batting .244 with three home runs and 16 RBI. In the offseason, he played 21 games for the Canberra Cavalry of the Australian Baseball League (ABL) and batted .275 with five home runs and 16 RBI. Reeves appeared in 27 games for Dunedin and seven games for the Double-A New Hampshire Fisher Cats in 2017, hitting a combined .192 before announcing his retirement from professional baseball on July 21.

== International baseball ==
On March 2, 2017, it was announced that Reeves would play for Team Canada at the 2017 World Baseball Classic.
