= Ryan Oduber =

Aruban baseball player (born 1997)

Hoofddorp Pioniers
- Pitcher
- Born: August 16, 1997 (age 28); Oranjestad, Aruba
- Bats: Left Throws: Left
- Stats at Baseball Reference

Ryan Luis Horacio Oduber (August 16, 1997) is an Arubian former professional baseball pitcher. Oduber spent time in the Boston Red Sox minor league organization from 2014 until his release in early 2018. He spent the 2015 season in the Dominican Summer League, 2016 in the Gulf Coast League, and 2017 in the New York–Penn League. He then pitched for the Hoofddorp Pioniers of the Honkbal Hoofdklasse in 2018.

Oduber was named to the Netherlands national baseball team's "designated player pool" for the 2017 World Baseball Classic but was not on the team's active roster for the tournament.
