= 2024 U-18 Baseball European Championship =

Tournament details
- Country: Germany
- Dates: July 8 – 14
- Teams: 12
- Defending champions: Spain

Final positions
- Champions: Italy (15th title)
- Runners-up: Germany
- Third place: Netherlands
- Fourth place: Great Britain

Tournament statistics
- Games played: 42

The 2024 U-18 Baseball European Championship was the 33rd edition of the U-18 Baseball European Championship, organised by Europe's governing baseball body, the WBSC Europe. The tournament was held in Regensburg, Germany from 8 to 14 July 2024. The top two teams of the tournament will qualify for the 2025 U-18 Baseball World Cup.

Italy defeated Germany 3–1 to win the championship. Both Italy and Germany have qualified for the 2025 U-18 Baseball World Cup.

== Participating teams ==
- Austria
- Belgium
- Croatia ▲ (Winners, 2023 U-18 European Championship Qualification Pool 2)
- Czech Republic
- France
- Germany
- Great Britain
- Israel
- Italy
- Netherlands
- Spain
- Sweden ▲ (Winners, 2023 U-18 European Championship Qualification Pool 1)

== Round robin ==
=== Group A ===
Pos	Team	Pld	W	L	RF	RA	PCT	GB	Qualification
1	Italy	5	5	0	42	4	1.000	—	Advance to semi final
2	Germany (H)	5	4	1	50	13	.800	1	Advance to semi final
3	Spain	5	3	2	36	15	.600	2	Advance to 5th–8th classification round
4	Austria	5	2	3	15	47	.400	3	Advance to 5th–8th classification round
5	Israel	5	1	4	29	40	.200	4	Advance to 9th–12th classification round
6	Croatia	5	0	5	11	64	.000	5	Advance to 9th–12th classification round

Source: WBSC Europe
(H) Hosts

Date	Local time	Road team	Score	Home team	Inn.	Venue	Game duration	Attendance	Boxscore
Jul 8, 2024	10:00	Spain	12–3	Austria		Armin-Wolf-Arena	2:54	230	Boxscore
Jul 8, 2024	14:00	Italy	7–0	Israel		Armin-Wolf-Arena	2:31	270	Boxscore
Jul 8, 2024	18:00	Croatia	0–15	Germany	F/4	Armin-Wolf-Arena	1:22	850	Boxscore
Jul 9, 2024	11:30	Austria	0–10	Italy	F/6	Regensburg Legionäre - Field 1	2:19	70	Boxscore
Jul 9, 2024	15;30	Israel	18–8	Croatia		Regensburg Legionäre - Field 1	3:29	17	Boxscore
Jul 9, 2024	18:00	Germany	7–1	Spain		Armin-Wolf-Arena	2:42	280	Boxscore
Jul 10, 2024	10:00	Croatia	0–14	Italy	F/5	Armin-Wolf-Arena	1:46	180	Boxscore
Jul 10, 2024	18:00	Austria	1–16	Germany	F/4	Armin-Wolf-Arena	1:32	315	Boxscore
Jul 10, 2024	19:30	Israel	3–9	Spain		Regensburg Legionäre - Field 1	2:12	320	Boxscore
Jul 11, 2024	17:15	Croatia	3–4	Austria		Regensburg Legionäre - Field 1	2:26	43	Boxscore
Jul 11, 2024	18:00	Israel	2–9	Germany		Armin-Wolf-Arena	2:17	340	Boxscore
Jul 11, 2024	20:30	Italy	2–1	Spain		Regensburg Legionäre - Field 1	2:15	220	Boxscore
Jul 12, 2024	11:30	Austria	7–6	Israel		Regensburg Legionäre - Field 1	2:30	85	Boxscore
Jul 12, 2024	18:00	Germany	3–9	Italy		Armin-Wolf-Arena	2:19	250	Boxscore
Jul 12, 2024	19:30	Spain	13–0	Croatia	F/5	Regensburg Legionäre - Field 1	1:22	17	Boxscore

=== Group B ===
Pos	Team	Pld	W	L	RF	RA	PCT	GB	Qualification
1	Netherlands	5	5	0	59	7	1.000	—	Advance to semi final
2	Great Britain	5	3	2	28	22	.600 (Note: Head-to-head result: Great Britain 11–5 France)	2	Advance to semi final
3	France	5	3	2	35	40	.600	2	Advance to 5th–8th classification round
4	Czech Republic	5	2	3	32	24	.400 (Note: Head-to-head result: Czech Republic 8–2 Belgium)	3	Advance to 5th–8th classification round
5	Belgium	5	2	3	28	33	.400	3	Advance to 9th–12th classification round
6	Sweden	5	0	5	7	63	.000	5	Advance to 9th–12th classification round

Source: WBSC Europe
Notes:

Date	Local time	Road team	Score	Home team	Inn.	Venue	Game duration	Attendance	Boxscore
Jul 8, 2024	11:30	Netherlands	13–3	Belgium	F/6	Regensburg Legionäre - Field 1	2:11	127	Boxscore
Jul 8, 2024	15:30	Sweden	5–11	France		Regensburg Legionäre - Field 1	2:23	96	Boxscore
Jul 8, 2024	19:30	Czech Republic	2–4	Great Britain		Regensburg Legionäre - Field 1	1:55	120	Boxscore
Jul 9, 2024	10:00	France	0–10	Netherlands	F/5	Armin-Wolf-Arena	1:43	90	Boxscore
Jul 9, 2024	14:00	Great Britain	10–0	Sweden	F/5	Armin-Wolf-Arena	1:48	127	Boxscore
Jul 9, 2024	19:30	Belgium	2–8	Czech Republic		Regensburg Legionäre - Field 1	2:46	60	Boxscore
Jul 10, 2024	11:30	Great Britain	1–9	Netherlands		Regensburg Legionäre - Field 1	2:23	150	Boxscore
Jul 10, 2024	14:00	Sweden	0–12	Czech Republic	F/5	Armin-Wolf-Arena	1:35	120	Boxscore
Jul 10, 2024	15:30	Belgium	6–9	France		Regensburg Legionäre - Field 1	2:45	72	Boxscore
Jul 11, 2024	10:00	Sweden	1–11	Belgium	F/5	Armin-Wolf-Arena	1:52	170	Boxscore
Jul 11, 2024	11:30	Great Britain	11–5	France	F/6	Regensburg Legionäre - Field 1	2:25	73	Boxscore
Jul 11, 2024	16:40	Czech Republic	2–8	Netherlands		Armin-Wolf-Arena	2:08	100	Boxscore
Jul 12, 2024	10:00	France	10–8	Czech Republic		Armin-Wolf-Arena	2:51	67	Boxscore
Jul 12, 2024	14:00	Belgium	6–2	Great Britain		Armin-Wolf-Arena	2:39	80	Boxscore
Jul 12, 2024	15:30	Netherlands	19–1	Sweden	F/5	Regensburg Legionäre - Field 1	2:22	50	Boxscore

== 9th–12th classification round ==
9th–12th place semifinals
13 July – Regensburg
Israel	9
Sweden	6
13 July – Regensburg
Belgium	7
Croatia	4

9th place match
14 July – Regensburg
Israel	11
Belgium	7
11th place match
14 July – Regensburg
Sweden	15
Croatia	2

=== 9th–12th place semifinals ===
Date	Local time	Road team	Score	Home team	Inn.	Venue	Game duration	Attendance	Boxscore
Jul 13, 2024	10:00	Sweden	6–9	Israel		Armin-Wolf-Arena	2:19	70	Boxscore
Jul 13, 2024	11:30	Croatia	4–7	Belgium		Regensburg Legionäre - Field 1	2:20	50	Boxscore

=== 11th place match ===
Date	Local time	Road team	Score	Home team	Inn.	Venue	Game duration	Attendance	Boxscore
Jul 14, 2024	11:30	Sweden	15–2	Croatia	F/5	Regensburg Legionäre - Field 1	2:00	46	Boxscore

=== 9th place match ===
Date	Local time	Road team	Score	Home team	Inn.	Venue	Game duration	Attendance	Boxscore
Jul 14, 2024	10:00	Belgium	7–11	Israel		Armin-Wolf-Arena	2:58	20	Boxscore

== 5th–8th classification round ==
5th–8th place semifinals
13 July – Regensburg
Spain	6
Czech Republic	5
13 July – Regensburg
France	10
Austria	0

5th place match
14 July – Regensburg
Spain	3
France	13
7th place match
14 July – Regensburg
Czech Republic	11
Austria	2

=== 5th–8th place semifinals ===
Date	Local time	Road team	Score	Home team	Inn.	Venue	Game duration	Attendance	Boxscore
Jul 13, 2024	14:00	Czech Republic	5–6	Spain		Armin-Wolf-Arena	2:39	75	Boxscore
Jul 13, 2024	15:30	Austria	0–10	France	F/6	Regensburg Legionäre - Field 1	1:55	75	Boxscore

=== 7th place match ===
Date	Local time	Road team	Score	Home team	Inn.	Venue	Game duration	Attendance	Boxscore
Jul 14, 2024	14;30	Czech Republic	11–2	Austria		Regensburg Legionäre - Field 1	2:20	60	Boxscore

=== 5th place match ===
Date	Local time	Road team	Score	Home team	Inn.	Venue	Game duration	Attendance	Boxscore
Jul 14, 2024	17:30	Spain	3–13	France	F/5	Regensburg Legionäre - Field 1	1:51	75	Boxscore

== Final round ==
Semifinals
13 July – Regensburg
Italy	6
Great Britain	1
13 July – Regensburg
Netherlands	5
Germany	6

Final
14 July – Regensburg
Italy	3
Germany	1
3rd place match
14 July – Regensburg
Great Britain	3
Netherlands	5

=== Semifinals ===
Date	Local time	Road team	Score	Home team	Inn.	Venue	Game duration	Attendance	Boxscore
Jul 13, 2024	18:00	Germany	6–1	Netherlands		Armin-Wolf-Arena	2:17	500	Boxscore
Jul 13, 2024	19:30	Great Britain	5–6	Italy	F/8	Regensburg Legionäre - Field 1	3:01	317	Boxscore

=== 3rd place match ===
Date	Local time	Road team	Score	Home team	Inn.	Venue	Game duration	Attendance	Boxscore
Jul 14, 2024	14:00	Great Britain	3–5	Netherlands		Armin-Wolf-Arena	2:39	90	Boxscore

=== Final ===
Date	Local time	Road team	Score	Home team	Inn.	Venue	Game duration	Attendance	Boxscore
Jul 14, 2024	19:00	Germany	1–3	Italy		Armin-Wolf-Arena	2:15	550	Boxscore

== Final standing ==
Rank	Team
1st place, gold medalist(s)	Italy
2nd place, silver medalist(s)	Germany
3rd place, bronze medalist(s)	Netherlands
4	Great Britain
5	France
6	Spain
7	Czech Republic
8	Austria
9	Israel
10	Belgium
11	Sweden
12	Croatia

Qualified for the 2025 U-18 World Cup
Relegated to the 2025 U-18 European Championship B Pool

== External websites ==
- Official website
