= 2026 U-18 Baseball European Championship =

Tournament details
- Country: Italy
- Dates: July 13 – 19
- Teams: 12
- Defending champions: Italy

Final positions
- Champions: Italy (16th title)
- Runners-up: Germany
- Third place: Netherlands
- Fourth place: France

Tournament statistics
- Games played: 42

The 2026 U-18 Baseball European Championship is the 34th edition of the U-18 Baseball European Championship, organised by Europe's governing baseball body, the WBSC Europe. The tournament is held in Ronchi dei Legionari and Trieste, Italy from 13 to 19 July 2026. The top two teams of the tournament will qualify for the 2027 U-18 Baseball World Cup.

== Participating teams ==
- Austria
- Belgium
- Czech Republic
- France
- Germany
- Great Britain
- Hungary ▲ (Winners, 2025 U-18 European Championship B Pool Group Bulgaria)
- Israel
- Italy
- Netherlands
- Poland ▲ (Winners, 2025 U-18 European Championship B Pool Group Poland)
- Spain

== Round robin ==
=== Group A ===
Pos	Team	Pld	W	L	RF	RA	PCT	GB	Qualification
1	Italy (H)	5	5	0	61	17	1.000	—	Advance to semifinal
2	France	5	4	1	45	24	.800	1	Advance to semifinal
3	Austria	5	2	3	32	41	.400	3	Advance to 5th–8th classification round
4	Great Britain	5	2	3	44	47	.400	3	Advance to 5th–8th classification round
5	Hungary	5	2	3	25	47	.400	3	Advance to 9th–12th classification round
6	Israel	5	0	5	10	41	.000	5	Advance to 9th–12th classification round

Source: WBSC Europe
(H) Hosts

Date	Local time	Road team	Score	Home team	Inn.	Venue	Game duration	Attendance	Boxscore
Jul 13, 2026	10:00	Great Britain	4–14	Austria	5	Stadio di Prosecco	2:02	105	Boxscore
Jul 13, 2026	14:00	Hungary	7–8	France		Stadio di Prosecco	2:43	50	Boxscore
Jul 13, 2026	18:00	Italy	11–0	Israel	5	Stadio di Prosecco	1:54	125	Boxscore
Jul 14, 2026	14:30	Israel	4–14	Great Britain	6	Campo Comunale Gaspardis	2:23	110	Boxscore
Jul 14, 2026	19:30	Austria	9–10	Hungary		Campo Comunale Gaspardis	2:46	50	Boxscore
Jul 14, 2026	19:30	France	5–6	Italy		Stadio di Prosecco	2:43	220	Boxscore
Jul 15, 2026	10:30	Hungary	1–11	Great Britain	6	Stadio di Prosecco	2:07	80	Boxscore
Jul 15, 2026	14:30	Israel	1–7	France		Stadio di Prosecco	1:47	50	Boxscore
Jul 15, 2026	19:30	Austria	4–12	Italy		Stadio di Prosecco	2:37	250	Boxscore
Jul 16, 2026	14:30	Austria	1–13	France	5	Campo Comunale Gaspardis	1:35	120	Boxscore
Jul 16, 2026	19:30	Hungary	5–3	Israel		Stadio di Prosecco	2:13	130	Boxscore
Jul 16, 2026	19:30	Great Britain	6–16	Italy	6	Campo Comunale Gaspardis	3:18	235	Boxscore
Jul 17, 2026	10:30	France	12–9	Great Britain		Campo Comunale Gaspardis	3:33	110	Boxscore
Jul 17, 2026	14:30	Israel	2–4	Austria		Stadio di Prosecco	2:00	45	Boxscore
Jul 17, 2026	19:30	Italy	16–2	Hungary		Stadio di Prosecco	2:44	160	Boxscore

=== Group B ===
Pos	Team	Pld	W	L	RF	RA	PCT	GB	Qualification
1	Germany	5	5	0	55	14	1.000	—	Advance to semifinal
2	Netherlands	5	4	1	39	11	.800	1	Advance to semifinal
3	Czech Republic	5	3	2	47	33	.600	2	Advance to 5th–8th classification round
4	Spain	5	2	3	23	32	.400	3	Advance to 5th–8th classification round
5	Belgium	5	1	4	14	51	.200	4	Advance to 9th–12th classification round
6	Poland	5	0	5	17	54	.000	5	Advance to 9th–12th classification round

Source: WBSC Europe

Date	Local time	Road team	Score	Home team	Inn.	Venue	Game duration	Attendance	Boxscore
Jul 13, 2026	10:30	Germany	17–2	Belgium	5	Campo Comunale Gaspardis	2:06	50	Boxscore
Jul 13, 2026	14:30	Netherlands	6–1	Czech Republic		Campo Comunale Gaspardis	2:34	120	Boxscore
Jul 13, 2026	19:30	Poland	1–5	Spain		Campo Comunale Gaspardis	2:30	60	Boxscore
Jul 14, 2026	10:30	Czech Republic	18–11	Poland		Campo Comunale Gaspardis	3:13	50	Boxscore
Jul 14, 2026	10:30	Belgium	1–11	Netherlands	5	Stadio di Prosecco	1:53	60	Boxscore
Jul 14, 2026	14:30	Spain	5–9	Germany	8	Stadio di Prosecco	2:56	95	Boxscore
Jul 15, 2026	10:30	Czech Republic	2–10	Germany		Campo Comunale Gaspardis	2:26	60	Boxscore
Jul 15, 2026	14:30	Poland	1–12	Netherlands	5	Campo Comunale Gaspardis	1:47	75	Boxscore
Jul 15, 2026	19:30	Belgium	0–10	Spain	5	Campo Comunale Gaspardis	2:02	105	Boxscore
Jul 16, 2026	10:30	Netherlands	3–5	Germany		Campo Comunale Gaspardis	2:35	200	Boxscore
Jul 16, 2026	10:30	Czech Republic	15–0	Spain	5	Stadio di Prosecco	2:03	55	Boxscore
Jul 16, 2026	14:30	Poland	2–5	Belgium		Stadio di Prosecco	2:14	40	Boxscore
Jul 17, 2026	10:30	Spain	3–7	Netherlands		Stadio di Prosecco	2:18	60	Boxscore
Jul 17, 2026	14:30	Germany	14–2	Poland	5	Campo Comunale Gaspardis	1:57	50	Boxscore
Jul 17, 2026	19:30	Belgium	6–11	Czech Republic		Campo Comunale Gaspardis	2:45	65	Boxscore

== 9th–12th classification round ==
9th–12th place semifinals
18 July –
Hungary	6
Poland	10
18 July –
Belgium	12
Israel	2

9th place match
19 July – Ronchi dei Legionari
Poland	7
Belgium	20
11th place match
19 July – Ronchi dei Legionari
Hungary	2
Israel	4

=== 9th–12th place semifinals ===
Date	Local time	Road team	Score	Home team	Inn.	Venue	Game duration	Attendance	Boxscore
July 18, 2026	10:30	Poland	10–6	Hungary		Stadio di Prosecco	2:38	25	Boxscore
July 18, 2026	10:30	Israel	2–12	Belgium	5	Campo Comunale Gaspardis	1:37	65	Boxscore

=== 11th place match ===
Date	Local time	Road team	Score	Home team	Inn.	Venue	Game duration	Attendance	Boxscore
July 19, 2026	10:00	Israel	4–2	Hungary		Campo Comunale Gaspardis	1:57	43	Boxscore

=== 9th place match ===
Date	Local time	Road team	Score	Home team	Inn.	Venue	Game duration	Attendance	Boxscore
July 19, 2026	14:00	Belgium	20–7	Poland	5	Campo Comunale Gaspardis	2:34	40	Boxscore

== 5th–8th classification round ==
5th–8th place semifinals
18 July –
Austria	0
Spain	12
18 July –
Czech Republic	13
Great Britain	1

5th place match
19 July – Trieste
Spain	9
Czech Republic	7
7th place match
19 July – Ronchi dei Legionari
Austria	5
Great Britain	14

=== 5th–8th place semifinals ===
Date	Local time	Road team	Score	Home team	Inn.	Venue	Game duration	Attendance	Boxscore
July 18, 2026	14:30	Spain	12–0	Austria	5	Campo Comunale Gaspardis	1:52	40	Boxscore
July 18, 2026	14:30	Great Britain	1–13	Czech Republic	5	Stadio di Prosecco	1:23	70	Boxscore

=== 7th place match ===
Date	Local time	Road team	Score	Home team	Inn.	Venue	Game duration	Attendance	Boxscore
July 19, 2026	18:00	Great Britain	14–5	Austria		Campo Comunale Gaspardis	2:38	50	Boxscore

=== 5th place match ===
Date	Local time	Road team	Score	Home team	Inn.	Venue	Game duration	Attendance	Boxscore
July 19, 2026	10:30	Spain	9–7	Czech Republic		Stadio di Prosecco	2:43	40	Boxscore

== Final round ==
Semifinals
18 July –
Italy	4
Netherlands	3
18 July –
Germany	8
France	1

Final
19 July – Trieste
Italy	6
Germany	4
3rd place match
19 July – Trieste
Netherlands	12
France	3

=== Semifinals ===
Date	Local time	Road team	Score	Home team	Inn.	Venue	Game duration	Attendance	Boxscore
July 18, 2026	19:30	France	1–8	Germany		Campo Comunale Gaspardis	2:20	100	Boxscore
July 18, 2026	19:30	Netherlands	3–4	Italy		Stadio di Prosecco	3:02	300	Boxscore

=== 3rd place match ===
Date	Local time	Road team	Score	Home team	Inn.	Venue	Game duration	Attendance	Boxscore
July 19, 2026	14:30	France	3–12	Netherlands		Stadio di Prosecco	2:34	90	Boxscore

=== Final ===
Date	Local time	Road team	Score	Home team	Inn.	Venue	Game duration	Attendance	Boxscore
July 19, 2026	19:30	Italy	6–4	Germany		Stadio di Prosecco	2:51	550	Boxscore

== Final standing ==
Rank	Team
1st place, gold medalist(s)	Italy
2nd place, silver medalist(s)	Germany
3rd place, bronze medalist(s)	Netherlands
4	France
5	Spain
6	Czech Republic
7	Great Britain
8	Austria
9	Belgium
10	Poland
11	Israel
12	Hungary

Qualified for the 2027 U-18 World Cup
Relegated to the 2027 U-18 European Championship B Pool

== External websites ==
- Official website
