= 2007 European Junior Baseball Championship =

International baseball competition held in 2007

Tournament details
- Country: Netherlands
- Dates: 30 July - 5 August
- Teams: 10

Final positions
- Champions: Italy
- Runners-up: Russia
- Third place: Netherlands
- Fourth place: Czech Republic

The 2007 European Junior Baseball Championship was an international baseball competition held at Sportpark De Groote Wielen in Rosmalen, The Netherlands from July 30 to August 5, 2007. It featured teams from Belgium, Czech Republic, France, Germany, Italy, Netherlands, Poland, Russia, Slovakia and Spain.

In the end the team from Italy won the tournament.

== Group stage ==
=== Pool A ===
==== Standings ====
Qualified for the semi-finals
Did not qualify for the semi-finals

#	Team	Games	Wins	Losses
1	Netherlands	4	4	0
2	Czech Republic	4	3	1
3	France	4	2	2
4	Slovakia	4	1	3
5	Poland	4	0	4

==== Game results ====
July 30, 2007	Poland	4 – 10	France	Rosmalen, Netherlands
July 30, 2007		Boxscore		Rosmalen, Netherlands

July 30, 2007	Netherlands	13 – 4	Slovakia	Rosmalen, Netherlands
July 30, 2007		Boxscore		Rosmalen, Netherlands

July 31, 2007	Slovakia	10 – 0 (F/7)	Poland	Rosmalen, Netherlands
July 31, 2007		Boxscore		Rosmalen, Netherlands

July 31, 2007	Czech Republic	4 – 0	France	Rosmalen, Netherlands
July 31, 2007		Boxscore		Rosmalen, Netherlands

August 1, 2007	France	8 – 1	Slovakia	Rosmalen, Netherlands
August 1, 2007		Boxscore		Rosmalen, Netherlands

August 1, 2007	Netherlands	3 – 1	Czech Republic	Rosmalen, Netherlands
August 1, 2007		Boxscore		Rosmalen, Netherlands

August 2, 2007	Czech Republic	11 – 1 (F/8)	Poland	Rosmalen, Netherlands
August 2, 2007		Boxscore		Rosmalen, Netherlands

August 2, 2007	France	1 – 13 (F/8)	Netherlands	Rosmalen, Netherlands
August 2, 2007		Boxscore		Rosmalen, Netherlands

August 3, 2007	Slovakia	0 – 18 (F/7)	Czech Republic	Rosmalen, Netherlands
August 3, 2007		Boxscore		Rosmalen, Netherlands

August 3, 2007	Poland	0 – 11	Netherlands	Rosmalen, Netherlands
August 3, 2007		Boxscore		Rosmalen, Netherlands

=== Pool B ===
==== Standings ====
Qualified for the semi-finals
Did not qualify for the semi-finals

#	Team	Games	Wins	Losses
1	Russia	4	4	0
2	Italy	4	3	1
3	Germany	4	1	3
4	Spain	4	1	3
5	Belgium	4	1	3

==== Game results ====
July 30, 2007	Belgium	4 – 10	Russia	Rosmalen, Netherlands
July 30, 2007		Boxscore		Rosmalen, Netherlands

July 30, 2007	Italy	9 – 3	Germany	Rosmalen, Netherlands
July 30, 2007		Boxscore		Rosmalen, Netherlands

July 31, 2007	Germany	5 – 6	Belgium	Rosmalen, Netherlands
July 31, 2007		Boxscore		Rosmalen, Netherlands

July 31, 2007	Spain	3 – 7	Russia	Rosmalen, Netherlands
July 31, 2007		Boxscore		Rosmalen, Netherlands

August 1, 2007	Russia	3 – 1	Germany	Rosmalen, Netherlands
August 1, 2007		Boxscore		Rosmalen, Netherlands

August 1, 2007	Italy	8 – 0	Spain	Rosmalen, Netherlands
August 1, 2007		Boxscore		Rosmalen, Netherlands

August 2, 2007	Spain	15 – 11	Belgium	Rosmalen, Netherlands
August 2, 2007		Boxscore		Rosmalen, Netherlands

August 2, 2007	Russia	10 – 4	Italy	Rosmalen, Netherlands
August 2, 2007		Boxscore		Rosmalen, Netherlands

August 3, 2007	Germany	3 – 1	Spain	Rosmalen, Netherlands
August 3, 2007		Boxscore		Rosmalen, Netherlands

August 3, 2007	Belgium	11 – 13	Italy	Rosmalen, Netherlands
August 3, 2007		Boxscore		Rosmalen, Netherlands

== Final round ==
=== 9th place ===
August 4, 2007	Belgium	4 – 0	Poland	Rosmalen, Netherlands
August 4, 2007		Boxscore		Rosmalen, Netherlands

=== 7th place ===
August 4, 2007	France	11 – 8	Germany	Rosmalen, Netherlands
August 4, 2007		Boxscore		Rosmalen, Netherlands

=== 5th place ===
August 4, 2007	Slovakia	3 – 2	Spain	Rosmalen, Netherlands
August 4, 2007		Boxscore		Rosmalen, Netherlands

=== Semi-finals ===
August 4, 2007	Netherlands	1 – 8	Italy	Rosmalen, Netherlands
August 4, 2007		Boxscore		Rosmalen, Netherlands

August 4, 2007	Russia	13 – 8	Czech Republic	Rosmalen, Netherlands
August 4, 2007		Boxscore		Rosmalen, Netherlands

=== 3rd place ===
August 5, 2007	Czech Republic	1 – 3	Netherlands	Rosmalen, Netherlands
August 5, 2007		Boxscore		Rosmalen, Netherlands

=== Final ===
August 5, 2007	Italy	4 – 2	Russia	Rosmalen, Netherlands
August 5, 2007		Boxscore		Rosmalen, Netherlands

== Final standings ==
Rk	Team
1	Italy
Lost in final
2	Russia
Failed to qualify for the Final
3	Netherlands
4	Czech Republic
Failed to qualify for the semi-finals
5	France
6	Germany
7	Slovakia
8	Spain
9	Belgium
10	Poland

2007 European Junior Baseball Championship

Italy
