= 2009 European Junior Baseball Championship =

Tournament details
- Country: Germany
- Dates: 3 August - 9 August
- Teams: 10
- Defending champions: Italy

Final positions
- Champions: Italy
- Runners-up: Netherlands
- Third place: France
- Fourth place: Russia

The 2009 European Junior Baseball Championship was an international baseball competition held at Baseballstadion Bonn-Rheinaue in Bonn, Germany from August 3 to August 9, 2009. It features teams from Belgium, Czech Republic, France, Germany, Italy, Netherlands, Russia, Slovakia, Spain and Ukraine.

In the end, the team from Italy won the tournament.

== Group stage ==
=== Pool A ===
==== Standings ====
Qualified for the semi-finals
Did not qualify for the semi-finals

#	Team	Games	Wins	Losses	Tiebreaker
1	Italy	4	4	0	-
2	France	4	2	2	1-1 (4.00 RA/9)
3	Spain	4	2	2	1-1 (5.82 RA/9)
4	Czech Republic	4	2	2	1-1 (8.47 RA/9)
5	Belgium	4	0	4	-

==== Game results ====
August 3, 2009	Italy	10 – 1	Spain	Bonn, Germany
August 3, 2009		Boxscore		Bonn, Germany

August 3, 2009	Belgium	7 – 10	France	Bonn, Germany
August 3, 2009		Boxscore		Bonn, Germany

August 4, 2009	Czech Republic	8 – 7	France	Bonn, Germany
August 4, 2009		Boxscore		Bonn, Germany

August 4, 2009	Spain	9 – 8	Belgium	Bonn, Germany
August 4, 2009		Boxscore		Bonn, Germany

August 5, 2009	France	7 – 0	Spain	Bonn, Germany
August 5, 2009		Boxscore		Bonn, Germany

August 5, 2009	Italy	10 – 1	Czech Republic	Bonn, Germany
August 5, 2009		Boxscore		Bonn, Germany

August 6, 2009	Czech Republic	10 – 2	Belgium	Bonn, Germany
August 6, 2009		Boxscore		Bonn, Germany

August 6, 2009	France	6 – 7	Italy	Bonn, Germany
August 6, 2009		Boxscore		Bonn, Germany

August 7, 2009	Spain	9 – 4	Czech Republic	Bonn, Germany
August 7, 2009		Boxscore		Bonn, Germany

August 7, 2009	Belgium	1 – 17 (F/7)	Italy	Bonn, Germany
August 7, 2009		Boxscore		Bonn, Germany

=== Pool B ===
==== Standings ====
Qualified for the semi-finals
Did not qualify for the semi-finals

#	Team	Games	Wins	Losses	Tiebreaker
1	Netherlands	4	4	0	-
2	Russia	4	2	2	1-1 (3.50 RA/9)
3	Germany	4	2	2	1-1 (3.94 RA/9)
4	Slovakia	4	2	2	1-1 (10.12 RA/9)
5	Ukraine	4	0	4	-

==== Game results ====
August 3, 2009	Russia	5 – 6	Slovakia	Bonn, Germany
August 3, 2009		Boxscore		Bonn, Germany

August 3, 2009	Ukraine	2 – 11	Germany	Bonn, Germany
August 3, 2009		Boxscore		Bonn, Germany

August 4, 2009	Slovakia	6 – 4	Ukraine	Bonn, Germany
August 4, 2009		Boxscore		Bonn, Germany

August 4, 2009	Netherlands	3 – 1	Germany	Bonn, Germany
August 4, 2009		Boxscore		Bonn, Germany

August 5, 2009	Russia	3 – 10	Netherlands	Bonn, Germany
August 5, 2009		Boxscore		Bonn, Germany

August 5, 2009	Germany	13 – 3 (F/7)	Slovakia	Bonn, Germany
August 5, 2009		Boxscore		Bonn, Germany

August 6, 2009	Netherlands	12 – 2 (F/7)	Ukraine	Bonn, Germany
August 6, 2009		Boxscore		Bonn, Germany

August 6, 2009	Germany	1 – 4	Russia	Bonn, Germany
August 6, 2009		Boxscore		Bonn, Germany

August 7, 2009	Ukraine	1– 10	Russia	Bonn, Germany
August 7, 2009		Boxscore		Bonn, Germany

August 7, 2009	Slovakia	1 – 11 (F/8)	Netherlands	Bonn, Germany
August 7, 2009		Boxscore		Bonn, Germany

== Final round ==
=== Pool C ===
==== Standings ====
#	Team	Games	Wins	Losses	Tiebreaker
1	Czech Republic	3	3	0	-
2	Ukraine	3	1	2	1-1 (4.20 RA/9)
3	Slovakia	3	1	2	1-1 (9.53 RA/9)
4	Belgium	3	1	2	1-1 (11.57 RA/9)

==== Game results ====
August 8, 2009	Czech Republic	8 – 1	Ukraine	Bonn, Germany
August 8, 2009		Boxscore		Bonn, Germany

August 8, 2009	Slovakia	4 – 14 (F/8)	Belgium	Bonn, Germany
August 8, 2009		Boxscore		Bonn, Germany

August 9, 2009	Ukraine	14 – 1 (F/7)	Belgium	Bonn, Germany
August 9, 2009		Boxscore		Bonn, Germany

August 9, 2009	Czech Republic	7 – 3	Slovakia	Bonn, Germany
August 9, 2009		Boxscore		Bonn, Germany

=== 5th place ===
August 8, 2009	Spain	2 – 8	Germany	Bonn, Germany
August 8, 2009		Boxscore		Bonn, Germany

=== Semi-finals ===
August 8, 2009	Netherlands	9 – 3	France	Bonn, Germany
August 8, 2009		Boxscore		Bonn, Germany

August 8, 2009	Italy	5 – 2	Russia	Bonn, Germany
August 8, 2009		Boxscore		Bonn, Germany

=== 3rd place ===
August 9, 2009	Russia	0 – 11 (F/8)	France	Bonn, Germany
August 9, 2009		Boxscore		Bonn, Germany

=== Final ===
August 9, 2009	Italy	4 – 3	Netherlands	Bonn, Germany
August 9, 2009		Boxscore		Bonn, Germany

== Final standings ==
Rk	Team
1	Italy
Lost in final
2	Netherlands
Failed to qualify for the Final
3	France
4	Russia
Failed to qualify for the semi-finals
5	Germany
6	Spain
7	Czech Republic
8	Ukraine
9	Slovakia
10	Belgium

2009 European Junior Baseball Championship

Italy
