= 2021 U-18 European Baseball Championship =

Tournament details
- Country: Italy
- Dates: 5–11 July
- Teams: 9
- Defending champions: Netherlands

Final positions
- Champions: Netherlands (4th title)
- Runners-up: Italy
- Third place: Germany
- Fourth place: Spain

The 2021 U-18 European Baseball Championship was the eighth edition of the U-18 European Baseball Championship, the biennial international men's youth football championship contested by the under-18 national teams of the member associations of WBSC Europe, since its inception in 2007 as the European Junior Baseball Championship. The tournament was hosted by the Italy from 5–11 July.

A total of nine teams played in the final tournament, with players born on or after 1 January 2003 eligible to participate.

In the final, the Netherlands defeated Italy 6–2 for their fourth title. Italy and the Netherlands qualified for the 2021 U-18 Baseball World Cup as the top two finishers in the tournament.

== First round ==
=== Group A ===
Pos	Team	Pld	W	L	RF	RA	RD	PCT	GB	Qualification or relegation
1	Italy (H)	4	4	0	51	13	+38	1.000	—	Advance to Semifinal round
2	Netherlands	4	3	1	40	16	+24	.750	1	Advance to Semifinal round
3	France	4	2	2	38	35	+3	.500	2	Advance to 5th-place game
4	Israel	4	1	3	18	35	−17	.250	3	Advance to relegation round
5	Lithuania	4	0	4	12	60	−48	.000	4	Advance to relegation round

Source: WBSC Europe
(H) Hosts

=== Group B ===
Pos	Team	Pld	W	L	RF	RA	RD	PCT	GB	Qualification or relegation
1	Germany	3	3	0	17	5	+12	1.000	—	Advance to Semifinal round
2	Spain	3	2	1	22	1	+21	.667	1	Advance to Semifinal round
3	Czech Republic	3	1	2	13	20	−7	.333	2	Advance to 5th-place game
4	Austria	3	0	3	8	34	−26	.000	3	Advance to relegation round

Source: WBSC Europe

== Relegation round ==
Pos	Team	Pld	W	L	RF	RA	RD	PCT	GB	Qualification or relegation
1	Israel (Note: The match between Israel and Lithuania in Group A carries over to the relegation round. Israel won 14–1.)	2	2	0	23	2	+21	1.000	—	
2	Austria	2	1	1	13	11	+2	.500	1	Relegation to lower division
3	Lithuania	2	0	2	3	26	−23	.000	2	Relegation to lower division

Source: WBSC Europe

== Knockout stage ==
Semi-finals
10 July
Germany	2
Netherlands	4
10 July
Spain	5
Italy	7

Gold medal game
11 July
Netherlands	6
Italy	2
Bronze medal game
11 July
Germany	10
Spain	0

Fifth place game
11 July
Czech Republic	7
France	10
