= 2022 U-18 European Baseball Championship =

Tournament details
- Country: Czech Republic
- Dates: August 13 – 20
- Teams: 12
- Defending champions: Netherlands

Final positions
- Champions: Spain (1st title)
- Runners-up: Netherlands
- Third place: Czech Republic
- Fourth place: Italy

Tournament statistics
- Games played: 42

The 2022 U-18 Baseball European Championship was the 32nd edition of the U-18 Baseball European Championship, organised by Europe's governing baseball body, the WBSC Europe. The tournament was held in Brno, Czech Republic from 13 to 19 July 2026. The top two teams of the tournament will qualify for the 2023 U-18 Baseball World Cup.

Spain defeated Netherlands 6–2 to win the championship. Spain won the title for the first time. Both Spain and Netherlands have qualified for the 2023 U-18 Baseball World Cup.

== Participating teams ==
- Austria
- Belgium ▲ (Winners, 2022 U-18 European Championship Qualification Group Trnava)
- Czech Republic
- France
- Germany
- Great Britain ▲ (Winners, 2022 U-18 European Championship Qualification Group Sundbyberg)
- Ireland
- Israel
- Italy
- Lithuania
- Netherlands
- Spain

== Round robin ==
=== Group A ===
Pos	Team	Pld	W	L	RF	RA	PCT	GB	Qualification
1	Spain	5	5	0	34	15	1.000	—	Advance to semi final
2	Netherlands	5	4	1	56	13	.800	1	Advance to semi final
3	France	5	3	2	43	20	.600	2	Advance to 5th–8th classification round
4	Great Britain	5	2	3	27	43	.400	3	Advance to 5th–8th classification round
5	Austria	5	1	4	26	42	.200	4	Advance to 9th–12th classification round
6	Lithuania	5	0	5	10	63	.000	5	Advance to 9th–12th classification round

Source: WBSC Europe

Date	Local time	Road team	Score	Home team	Inn.	Venue	Game duration	Attendance	Boxscore
Aug 13, 2022	11:00	Netherlands	20–0	Lithuania	4	Hluboká Baseball & Softball Club	1:32	50	Boxscore
Aug 13, 2022	15;00	Spain	12–0	Austria	5	Hluboká Baseball & Softball Club	1:56	100	Boxscore
Aug 13, 2022	19:00	Great Britain	0–15	France	4	Hluboká Baseball & Softball Club	3:14	100	Boxscore
Aug 14, 2022	11:00	Lithuania	5–7	Spain		Hluboká Baseball & Softball Club	2:45	70	Boxscore
Aug 14, 2022	15:00	France	4–8	Netherlands		Hluboká Baseball & Softball Club	2:29	100	Boxscore
Aug 14, 2022	19:00	Austria	5–7	Great Britain		Hluboká Baseball & Softball Club	2:44	100	Boxscore
Aug 15, 2022	11:00	Lithuania	0–10	France	6	Hluboká Baseball & Softball Club	1:44	50	Boxscore
Aug 15, 2022	15:00	Austria	2–12	Netherlands	5	Hluboká Baseball & Softball Club	1:40	100	Boxscore
Aug 15, 2022	19:00	Great Britain	3–6	Spain		Hluboká Baseball & Softball Club	2:24	120	Boxscore
Aug 16, 2022	11:00	Austria	7–10	France		Hluboká Baseball & Softball Club	3:05	50	Boxscore
Aug 16, 2022	15:00	Great Britain	14–4	Lithuania	6	Hluboká Baseball & Softball Club	2:10	60	Boxscore
Aug 16, 2022	19:00	Spain	4–3	Netherlands	8	Hluboká Baseball & Softball Club	2:58	250	Boxscore
Aug 17, 2022	11:00	Netherlands	13–3	Great Britain	5	MBS Brno	2:14	100	Boxscore
Aug 17, 2022	15:00	France	4–5	Spain	8	MBS Brno	2:37	52	Boxscore
Aug 17, 2022	17:00	Lithuania	1–12	Austria	5	Olympia Blansko	1:31	45	Boxscore

=== Group B ===
Pos	Team	Pld	W	L	RF	RA	PCT	GB	Qualification
1	Czech Republic (H)	5	5	0	70	23	1.000	—	Advance to semi final
2	Italy	5	4	1	45	17	.800	1	Advance to semi final
3	Germany	5	3	2	41	37	.600	2	Advance to 5th–8th classification round
4	Israel	5	2	3	4	62	.400	3	Advance to 5th–8th classification round
5	Belgium	5	1	4	31	43	.200	4	Advance to 9th–12th classification round
6	Ireland	5	0	5	26	35	.000	5	Advance to 9th–12th classification round

Source: WBSC Europe
(H) Hosts

Date	Local time	Road team	Score	Home team	Inn.	Venue	Game duration	Attendance	Boxscore
Aug 13, 2022	11:00	Italy	15–0	Ireland	4	Arrows Park Ostrava	1:42	75	Boxscore
Aug 13, 2022	15:00	Belgium	5–15	Czech Republic	6	Arrows Park Ostrava	2:27	224	Boxscore
Aug 14, 2022	10:00	Germany	12–7	Israel	6	Arrows Park Ostrava	2:25	116	Boxscore
Aug 14, 2022	13:00	Israel	6–1	Belgium		Arrows Park Ostrava	2:12	150	Boxscore
Aug 14, 2022	16:00	Ireland	1–3	Germany		Arrows Park Ostrava	1:53	94	Boxscore
Aug 14, 2022	19:00	Czech Republic	9–3	Italy	6	Arrows Park Ostrava	2:01	455	Boxscore
Aug 15, 2022	11:00	Belgium	7–10	Germany		Arrows Park Ostrava	2:29	41	Boxscore
Aug 15, 2022	15:00	Israel	0–9	Italy		Arrows Park Ostrava	2:08	65	Boxscore
Aug 15, 2022	19:00	Ireland	2–18	Czech Republic	4	Arrows Park Ostrava	1:37	45	Boxscore
Aug 16, 2022	11:00	Germany	6–7	Italy		Arrows Park Ostrava	2:55	222	Boxscore
Aug 16, 2022	15:00	Belgium	16–1	Ireland	5	Arrows Park Ostrava	1:54	75	Boxscore
Aug 16, 2022	19:00	Israel	3–13	Czech Republic	5	Arrows Park Ostrava	2:12	263	Boxscore
Aug 18, 2022	12:00	Ireland	0–10	Israel	5	BrnoField –"Sportovní areál Hroch"	1:37	74	Boxscore
Aug 18, 2022	16:00	Italy	11–2	Belgium		BrnoField –"Sportovní areál Hroch"	2:29	85	Boxscore
Aug 18, 2022	19:00	Czech Republic	15–10	Germany		MBS Brno	3:05	365	Boxscore

== 9th–12th classification round ==
9th–12th place semifinals
18 July –
Austria	12
Ireland	2
18 July –
Belgium	7
Lithuania	0

9th place match
19 July
Austria	4
Belgium	3
11th place match
19 July
Ireland	11
Lithuania	3

=== 9th–12th place semifinals ===
Date	Local time	Road team	Score	Home team	Inn.	Venue	Game duration	Attendance	Boxscore
Aug 19, 2022	12:00	Ireland	2–12	Austria	6	BrnoField –"Sportovní areál Hroch"	1:59	52	Boxscore
Aug 19, 2022	16:00	Lithuania	0–7	Belgium		BrnoField –"Sportovní areál Hroch"			Forfeit

=== 11th place match ===
Date	Local time	Road team	Score	Home team	Inn.	Venue	Game duration	Attendance	Boxscore
Aug 20, 2022	13:00	Lithuania	3–11	Ireland		Hřiště Technika Brno	2:18	40	Boxscore

=== 9th place match ===
Date	Local time	Road team	Score	Home team	Inn.	Venue	Game duration	Attendance	Boxscore
Aug 20, 2022	12:00	Belgium	3–4	Austria		BrnoField –"Sportovní areál Hroch"	2:14	50	Boxscore

== 5th–8th classification round ==
5th–8th place semifinals
18 July –
France	6
Israel	3
18 July –
Germany	3
Great Britain	0

5th place match
19 July
France	1
Germany	14
7th place match
19 July
Israel	3
Great Britain	9

=== 5th–8th place semifinals ===
Date	Local time	Road team	Score	Home team	Inn.	Venue	Game duration	Attendance	Boxscore
Aug 19, 2022	11:00	Great Britain	0–3	Germany		MBS Brno	1:48	71	Boxscore
Aug 19, 2022	17:00	Israel	3–6	France		Olympia Blansko	1:55	30	Boxscore

=== 7th place match ===
Date	Local time	Road team	Score	Home team	Inn.	Venue	Game duration	Attendance	Boxscore
Aug 20, 2022	16:00	Great Britain	9–3	Israel		BrnoField –"Sportovní areál Hroch"	2:48	50	Boxscore

=== 5th place match ===
Date	Local time	Road team	Score	Home team	Inn.	Venue	Game duration	Attendance	Boxscore
Aug 20, 2022	10:00	Germany	14–1	France	5	MBS Brno	2:03	57	Boxscore

== Final round ==
Semifinals
18 July –
Spain	3
Italy	2
18 July –
Czech Republic	2
Netherlands	8

Final
19 July
Spain	6
Netherlands	2
3rd place match
19 July
Italy	2
Czech Republic	4

=== Semifinals ===
Date	Local time	Road team	Score	Home team	Inn.	Venue	Game duration	Attendance	Boxscore
Aug 19, 2022	15:00	Italy	2–3	Spain		MBS Brno	2:17	225	Boxscore
Aug 19, 2022	19:00	Netherlands	8–2	Czech Republic		MBS Brno	2:07	425	Boxscore

=== 3rd place match ===
Date	Local time	Road team	Score	Home team	Inn.	Venue	Game duration	Attendance	Boxscore
Aug 20, 2022	14:00	Italy	2–4	Czech Republic		MBS Brno	1:58	300	Boxscore

=== Final ===
Date	Local time	Road team	Score	Home team	Inn.	Venue	Game duration	Attendance	Boxscore
Aug 20, 2022	19:40	Netherlands	2–6	Spain	5	MBS Brno	1:56	300	Boxscore

== Final standing ==
Rank	Team
1st place, gold medalist(s)	Spain
2nd place, silver medalist(s)	Netherlands
3rd place, bronze medalist(s)	Czech Republic
4	Italy
5	Germany
6	France
7	Great Britain
8	Israel
9	Austria
10	Belgium
11	Ireland
12	Lithuania

Qualified for the 2023 U-18 World Cup
Relegated to the 2023 U-18 European Championship Qualification

== External websites ==
- Official website
