= U-18 Baseball European Championship =

International youth baseball tournament

- Current season, competition or edition: 2026 U-18 Baseball European Championship
- Sport: Baseball
- Founded: 1974
- No. of teams: 10 (Finals)
- Continent: Europe
- Most recent champion: Italy (16th title)
- Most titles: Netherlands (17 titles)

The U-18 Baseball European Championship, sometimes referred to as the U-18 European Baseball Championship and formerly the European Junior Baseball Championship, is a biennial, under-18 international baseball tournament sanctioned and created by the WBSC Europe. The tournament is conducted in the year prior to the 18U Baseball World Cup (formerly called the World Junior Baseball Championship), which is likewise held every other year. The top 2 teams in the European Junior Baseball Championship qualify for the World Cup.

== Results ==
Ed.	Year	Final Host	Final			Semifinalists	
Ed.	Year	Final Host	Champions	Score	Runners-up	3rd place	4th place
1	1974; Details	(Netherlands); Apeldoorn	Netherlands	-	Italy	Spain	France
2	1976; Details	(Italy); Parma	Italy	-	Netherlands	Spain	
3	1978; Details	(Netherlands); Oosterhout	Italy	3-1 7-0	Netherlands	Belgium	Sweden
4	1980; Details	(Belgium); Antwerp	Italy	16-1 14-3	Belgium	Sweden	Netherlands
5	1982; Details	(Sweden); Stockholm	Netherlands	3-2 10-5	Italy	Spain	Sweden
6	1984; Details	(Spain); Sant Boi de Llobregat	Italy	2-0 5-2	Netherlands	Spain	France
7	1986; Details	(Belgium); Antwerp	Netherlands	12-1	Italy	Spain	Belgium
8	1987; Details	(Italy); Roma/Nettuno/Anzio	Italy	-	Netherlands	Spain	Belgium
9	1988; Details	(France); Pineuilh	Netherlands	6-5 8-10 12-8	Italy	France	Sweden
10	1989; Details	(Netherlands); Leeuwarden	Netherlands	-	Italy	Spain France Czechoslovakia	
11	1990; Details	(Belgium); Antwerp	Italy	15-3	Spain	France	Netherlands
12	1991; Details	(Italy); Livorno	Italy	5-0 16-3	Spain	Netherlands	Czechoslovakia
13	1992; Details	(Belgium); Antwerp	Netherlands	25-0	Italy	Belgium	France
14	1993; Details	(Spain); Barcelona	Netherlands	5-3	Italy	Spain	Czech Republic
15	1994; Details	(Netherlands); Oosterhout	Italy	9-6	Netherlands	Spain	Czech Republic
16	1995; Details	(Italy); Trieste	Italy	6-3 8-0	Netherlands	Spain	Russia
17	1996; Details	(Netherlands); Almere	Netherlands	4-1	Spain	Russia	Italy
18	1997; Details	(Italy); Livorno	Netherlands	7-2	Italy	Russia	Germany
19	1998; Details	(Czech Republic); Ostrava	Netherlands	10-2	Italy	Czech Republic	Ukraine
20	1999; Details	(Germany); Mainz/Wiesbaden	Netherlands	14-13	Russia	Italy	Germany
21	2001; Details	(Spain); Viladecans	Italy	13-3	Spain	Netherlands	France
22	2003; Details	(Netherlands); Capelle aan den IJssel	Netherlands	3-2	Italy	Germany	Spain
23	2005; Details	(Spain); Pamplona	Netherlands	10-8	Italy	Spain	Czech Republic
24	2007; Details	(Netherlands); Rosmalen	Italy	4–2	Russia	Netherlands	Czech Republic
25	2009; Details	(Germany); Bonn	Italy	4–3	Netherlands	France	Russia
26	2011; Details	(Spain); Gijón	Netherlands	10–4	Czech Republic	Italy	Germany
27	2013; Details	(Czech Republic); Prague	Italy	10–5	Czech Republic	Netherlands	Spain
28	2015; Details	(Czech Republic); Ostrava	Italy	10–6	Netherlands	Czech Republic	France
29	2016; Details	(Spain); Gijón	Netherlands	7–3	Italy	Germany	Czech Republic
30	2018; Details	(Italy); Grosseto	Netherlands	6–3	Spain	Czech Republic	Italy
31	2021; Details	(Italy); Macerata	Netherlands	6–2	Italy	Germany	Spain
32	2022; Details	(Czech Republic); Brno	Spain	6–2	Netherlands	Czech Republic	Italy
33	2024; Details	(Germany); Regensburg	Italy	3–1	Germany	Netherlands	Great Britain
34	2026; Details	(Italy); Trieste/Ronchi dei Legionari	Italy	6–4	Germany	Netherlands	France

== Medals ==
Rank	Nation	Gold	Silver	Bronze	Total
1	Netherlands	17	9	6	32
2	Italy	16	13	2	31
3	Spain	1	5	11	17
4	Czech Republic	0	2	5	7
5	Germany	0	2	3	5
6	Russia	0	2	2	4
7	Belgium	0	1	2	3
8	France	0	0	4	4
9	Sweden	0	0	1	1
Totals (9 entries)		34	34	36	104

- 3 Bronze awarded in 1989 (CZE, FRA, ESP).

== See also ==
- U-18 Baseball World Cup
- European Baseball Championship
- U-23 Baseball European Championship
- U-15 Baseball European Championship
