= 2010 World Junior Baseball Championship =

Tournament details
- Country: Canada
- Dates: 23 July - 1 August
- Teams: 12
- Defending champions: South Korea

Final positions
- Champions: Chinese Taipei (2nd title)
- Runners-up: Australia
- Third place: Cuba
- Fourth place: Canada

Tournament statistics
- Games played: 45
- Attendance: 48,500 (1,078 per game)
- Best BA: (Chinese Taipei) Tzu Wei Lin (.607)
- Most HRs: (Australia) Ryan Battaglia (3)
- Most SBs: (Czech Republic) Petr Sila (4 out 6)
- Best ERA: (United States) John Simms (0.00)
- Most Ks (as pitcher): (South Korea) Chang Sik Yoo (31)

The 2010 World Junior Baseball Championship was an international baseball competition being held at the Port Arthur Stadium and Central Ball Park in Thunder Bay, Ontario, Canada from July 23 to August 1, 2010.

== Teams ==
Just before the tournament started on July 23, the organization had to announce that the team from Venezuela would not attend the tournament. However, on the second day of the tournament it was announced that Venezuela has joined the other 11 nations. The original schedule remained in place, and Venezuela forfeited its first scheduled game on July 23, giving a 9–0 win to Australia. That game will not be made up.

The following 12 teams qualified for the tournament.

Pool A		Pool B	
Australia	Representation of Oceania	Canada	Host nation
Chinese Taipei	Asian qualifier	Cuba	Americas qualifier
France	European qualifier	Czech Republic	Replaced South Africa
Italy	European qualifier	Netherlands	European qualifier
United States	Americas qualifier	Panama	Replaced Japan
Venezuela	Americas qualifier	South Korea	Asian qualifier

== Preliminaries ==
=== Pool A ===
==== Standings ====
Teams	W	L	Pct.	GB	R	RA .
United States	5	0	1.000	–	54	9
Chinese Taipei	4	1	.800	1	46	26
Australia	3	2	.600	2	52	22
Italy	2	3	.400	3	28	50
Venezuela	1	4	.200	4	20	40
France	0	5	.000	5	12	65

==== Schedule ====
July 23, 2010	Australia	9 – 0 (Forfeit)	Venezuela	Port Arthur Stadium, Thunder Bay

July 24, 2010	France	1 – 11 (F/7)	Chinese Taipei	Baseball Central Fields, Thunder Bay; Attendance: 300
July 24, 2010		Boxscore		Baseball Central Fields, Thunder Bay; Attendance: 300

July 24, 2010	United States	4 – 2	Australia	Port Arthur Stadium, Thunder Bay; Attendance: 1,000
July 24, 2010		Boxscore		Port Arthur Stadium, Thunder Bay; Attendance: 1,000

July 24, 2010	Venezuela	5 – 6 (F/11)	Italy	Baseball Central Fields, Thunder Bay; Attendance: 100
July 24, 2010		Boxscore		Baseball Central Fields, Thunder Bay; Attendance: 100

July 25, 2010	France	2 – 8	Venezuela	Port Arthur Stadium, Thunder Bay; Attendance: 350
July 25, 2010		Boxscore		Port Arthur Stadium, Thunder Bay; Attendance: 350

July 25, 2010	Australia	11 – 13	Chinese Taipei	Baseball Central Fields, Thunder Bay; Attendance: 450
July 25, 2010		Boxscore		Baseball Central Fields, Thunder Bay; Attendance: 450

July 25, 2010	Italy	0 – 10 (F/7)	United States	Port Arthur Stadium, Thunder Bay; Attendance: 1,500
July 25, 2010		Boxscore		Port Arthur Stadium, Thunder Bay; Attendance: 1,500

July 26, 2010	Italy	14 – 8	France	Port Arthur Stadium, Thunder Bay; Attendance: 400
July 26, 2010		Boxscore		Port Arthur Stadium, Thunder Bay; Attendance: 400

July 26, 2010	Chinese Taipei	0 – 10 (F/7)	United States	Port Arthur Stadium, Thunder Bay; Attendance: 0
July 26, 2010		Boxscore		Port Arthur Stadium, Thunder Bay; Attendance: 0

July 27, 2010	France	1 – 16 (F/6)	Australia	Baseball Central Fields, Thunder Bay; Attendance: 275
July 27, 2010		Boxscore		Baseball Central Fields, Thunder Bay; Attendance: 275

July 27, 2010	Chinese Taipei	13 – 4	Italy	Baseball Central Fields, Thunder Bay; Attendance: 0
July 27, 2010		Boxscore		Baseball Central Fields, Thunder Bay; Attendance: 0

July 27, 2010	Venezuela	7 – 14	United States	Baseball Central Fields, Thunder Bay; Attendance: 0
July 27, 2010		Boxscore		Baseball Central Fields, Thunder Bay; Attendance: 0

July 28, 2010	Italy	4 – 14 (F/7)	Australia	Baseball Central Fields, Thunder Bay; Attendance: 125
July 28, 2010		Boxscore		Baseball Central Fields, Thunder Bay; Attendance: 125

July 28, 2010	United States	16 – 0 (F/5)	France	Port Arthur Stadium, Thunder Bay; Attendance: 225
July 28, 2010		Boxscore		Port Arthur Stadium, Thunder Bay; Attendance: 225

July 28, 2010	Venezuela	0 – 9	Chinese Taipei	Baseball Central Fields, Thunder Bay; Attendance: 350
July 28, 2010		Boxscore		Baseball Central Fields, Thunder Bay; Attendance: 350

=== Pool B ===
==== Standings ====
Teams	W	L	Pct.	GB	R	RA
Canada	4	1	.800	–	31	18
South Korea	4	1	.800	–	35	10
Netherlands	3	2	.600	1	29	33
Cuba	3	2	.600	1	40	15
Panama	1	4	.200	3	13	41
Czech Republic	0	5	.000	4	17	48

==== Schedule ====
July 23, 2010	Panama	0 – 10 (F/7)	Cuba	Port Arthur Stadium, Thunder Bay; Attendance: 500
July 23, 2010		Boxscore		Port Arthur Stadium, Thunder Bay; Attendance: 500

July 23, 2010	Canada	9 – 2	Netherlands	Port Arthur Stadium, Thunder Bay; Attendance: 2,000
July 23, 2010		Boxscore		Port Arthur Stadium, Thunder Bay; Attendance: 2,000

July 24, 2010	Netherlands	0 – 10 (F/8)	South Korea	Baseball Central Fields, Thunder Bay; Attendance: 300
July 24, 2010		Boxscore		Baseball Central Fields, Thunder Bay; Attendance: 300

July 24, 2010	Czech Republic	5 – 7	Panama	Baseball Central Fields, Thunder Bay; Attendance: 225
July 24, 2010		Boxscore		Baseball Central Fields, Thunder Bay; Attendance: 225

July 24, 2010	Cuba	3 – 0	Canada	Port Arthur Stadium, Thunder Bay; Attendance: 4,500
July 24, 2010		Boxscore		Port Arthur Stadium, Thunder Bay; Attendance: 4,500

July 25, 2010	Netherlands	5 – 2	Panama	Baseball Central Fields, Thunder Bay; Attendance: 150
July 25, 2010		Boxscore		Baseball Central Fields, Thunder Bay; Attendance: 150

July 25, 2010	Cuba	16 – 1 (F/7)	Czech Republic	Baseball Central Fields, Thunder Bay; Attendance: 0
July 25, 2010		Boxscore		Baseball Central Fields, Thunder Bay; Attendance: 0

July 25, 2010	Canada	5 – 4	South Korea	Port Arthur Stadium, Thunder Bay; Attendance: 2,500
July 25, 2010		Boxscore		Port Arthur Stadium, Thunder Bay; Attendance: 2,500

July 26, 2010	Czech Republic	0 – 4	South Korea	Port Arthur Stadium, Thunder Bay; Attendance: 200
July 26, 2010		Boxscore		Port Arthur Stadium, Thunder Bay; Attendance: 200

July 27, 2010	Netherlands	13 – 4	Czech Republic	Baseball Central Fields, Thunder Bay; Attendance: 0
July 27, 2010		Boxscore		Baseball Central Fields, Thunder Bay; Attendance: 0

July 27, 2010	South Korea	5 – 3	Cuba	Port Arthur Stadium, Thunder Bay; Attendance: 1,200
July 27, 2010		Boxscore		Port Arthur Stadium, Thunder Bay; Attendance: 1,200

July 27, 2010	Panama	2 – 9	Canada	Port Arthur Stadium, Thunder Bay; Attendance: 4,200
July 27, 2010		Boxscore		Port Arthur Stadium, Thunder Bay; Attendance: 4,200

July 28, 2010	Cuba	8 – 9 (F/10)	Netherlands	Baseball Central Fields, Thunder Bay; Attendance: 500
July 28, 2010		Boxscore		Baseball Central Fields, Thunder Bay; Attendance: 500

July 28, 2010	South Korea	12 – 2 (F/7)	Panama	Port Arthur Stadium, Thunder Bay; Attendance: 475
July 28, 2010		Boxscore		Port Arthur Stadium, Thunder Bay; Attendance: 475

July 28, 2010	Czech Republic	7 – 8	Canada	Port Arthur Stadium, Thunder Bay; Attendance: 3,500
July 28, 2010		Boxscore		Port Arthur Stadium, Thunder Bay; Attendance: 3,500

== Playoffs ==
July 30, 2010	France	3 – 5	Panama	Baseball Central Fields, Thunder Bay; Attendance: 100
July 30, 2010		Boxscore		Baseball Central Fields, Thunder Bay; Attendance: 100

July 30, 2010	Czech Republic	6 – 9	Venezuela	Port Arthur Stadium, Thunder Bay; Attendance: 0
July 30, 2010		Boxscore		Port Arthur Stadium, Thunder Bay; Attendance: 0

=== 11th place game ===
July 31, 2010	France	8 – 5 (F/10)	Czech Republic	Baseball Central Fields, Thunder Bay; Attendance: 325
July 31, 2010		Boxscore		Baseball Central Fields, Thunder Bay; Attendance: 325

=== 9th place game ===
July 31, 2010	Venezuela	7 – 5	Panama	Port Arthur Stadium, Thunder Bay; Attendance: 300
July 31, 2010		Boxscore		Port Arthur Stadium, Thunder Bay; Attendance: 300

== Finals ==
Quarterfinals
B3	Netherlands	2
A2	Chinese Taipei	4
A4	Italy	1
B1	Canada	11
A3	Australia	5
B2	South Korea	4
B4	Cuba	3
A1	United States	2

Semifinals
WQF1	Chinese Taipei	3
WQF4	Canada	1
WQF3	Australia	2
WQF2	Cuba	1

Finals
WSF2	Australia	4
WSF1	Chinese Taipei	8
Third place
LSF2	Cuba	8
LSF1	Canada	2

=== Quarterfinals ===
July 30, 2010	Netherlands	2 – 4	Chinese Taipei	Baseball Central Fields, Thunder Bay; Attendance: 500
July 30, 2010		Boxscore		Baseball Central Fields, Thunder Bay; Attendance: 500

July 30, 2010	Cuba	3 – 2	United States	Port Arthur Stadium, Thunder Bay; Attendance: 2,000
July 30, 2010		Boxscore		Port Arthur Stadium, Thunder Bay; Attendance: 2,000

July 30, 2010	Australia	5 – 4	South Korea	Fort William Gardens, Thunder Bay; Attendance: 500
July 30, 2010		Boxscore		Fort William Gardens, Thunder Bay; Attendance: 500

July 30, 2010	Italy	1 – 11 (F/7)	Canada	Port Arthur Stadium, Thunder Bay; Attendance: 5,000
July 30, 2010		Boxscore		Port Arthur Stadium, Thunder Bay; Attendance: 5,000

=== Losers Semifinals ===
July 31, 2010	Netherlands	8 – 5	Italy	Baseball Central Fields, Thunder Bay; Attendance: 300
July 31, 2010		Boxscore		Baseball Central Fields, Thunder Bay; Attendance: 300

July 31, 2010	United States	4 – 2	South Korea	Baseball Central Fields, Thunder Bay; Attendance: 500
July 31, 2010		Boxscore		Baseball Central Fields, Thunder Bay; Attendance: 500

=== Semifinals ===
July 31, 2010	Chinese Taipei	3 – 1	Canada	Port Arthur Stadium, Thunder Bay; Attendance: 5,000
July 31, 2010		Boxscore		Port Arthur Stadium, Thunder Bay; Attendance: 5,000

July 31, 2010	Australia	2 – 1	Cuba	Port Arthur Stadium, Thunder Bay; Attendance: 1,200
July 31, 2010		Boxscore		Port Arthur Stadium, Thunder Bay; Attendance: 1,200

=== 7th place game ===
August 1, 2010	Italy	1 – 3	South Korea	Baseball Central Fields, Thunder Bay; Attendance: 100
August 1, 2010		Boxscore		Baseball Central Fields, Thunder Bay; Attendance: 100

=== 5th place game ===
August 1, 2010	Netherlands	2 – 18 (F/6)	United States	Baseball Central Fields, Thunder Bay; Attendance: 150
August 1, 2010		Boxscore		Baseball Central Fields, Thunder Bay; Attendance: 150

=== Bronze medal game ===
August 1, 2010	Cuba	8 – 2	Canada	Port Arthur Stadium, Thunder Bay; Attendance: 1,700
August 1, 2010		Boxscore		Port Arthur Stadium, Thunder Bay; Attendance: 1,700

=== Gold medal game ===
August 1, 2010	Australia	4 – 8	Chinese Taipei	Port Arthur Stadium, Thunder Bay; Attendance: 5,500
August 1, 2010		Boxscore		Port Arthur Stadium, Thunder Bay; Attendance: 5,500

== Final standings ==
Rk	Team	W	L
1st place, gold medalist(s)	Chinese Taipei	7	1
Lost in Final
2nd place, silver medalist(s)	Australia	5	3
Failed to qualify for Final
3rd place, bronze medalist(s)	Cuba	5	3
4	Canada	5	3
Failed to qualify for the Semifinals
5	United States	7	1
6	Netherlands	4	4
Failed to qualify for the 5th place game
7	South Korea	5	3
8	Italy	2	6
Failed to qualify for the Quarterfinals
9	Venezuela	3	4
10	Panama	2	5
Failed to qualify for the 9th place game
11	France	1	6
12	Czech Republic	0	7

2010 World Junior Baseball champions

Chinese Taipei
2nd title

== Awards ==
Following the final, the IBAF World Juniors Baseball Championship Technical Commission announced the All-IBAF 2010 World Juniors Baseball Championship Team. Only pool games were used to determine the players selected.

All-IBAF Juniors Team
Position	Player
Starting Pitcher	(Cuba) Omar Luis Rodriguez
Relief Pitcher	(South Korea) Chang Sik Yoo
Catcher	(Australia) Ryan Battaglia
First Base	(Cuba) Guilermo Aviles
Second Base	(Chinese Taipei) Hong Sheng Yang
Third Base	(Chinese Taipei) Tzu-Wei Lin
Short Stop	(United States) Francisco Lindor
Outfield	(United States) Michael Lorenzen
Outfield	(Cuba) Geikis Jimenez
Outfield	(Canada) Alexander Calbick
Designated Hitter	(Canada) Phillip Diedrick

Tournament Awards
Award	Player
MVP	(Chinese Taipei) Tzu Wei Lin
Leading Batter	(Chinese Taipei) Tzu Wei Lin
Best Earned Run Average (Pitcher)	(United States) John Simms
Best Won/Loss Average (Pitcher)	(Cuba) Omar Luis Rodriguez (Venezuela) Darwin Ramirez
Most Runs Batted In	(Chinese Taipei) Hong Sheng Yang
Most Home Runs	(Australia) Ryan Battaglia
Most Stolen Bases	(Czech Republic) Petr Sila
Most Runs Scored	(Chinese Taipei) Tzu Wei Lin
Outstanding Defensive Player	(Italy) Luca Ainger
