= 2011 European Junior Baseball Championship =

Tournament details
- Country: Spain
- Dates: 4 July - 10 July
- Teams: 10
- Defending champions: Italy

Final positions
- Champions: Netherlands
- Runners-up: Czech Republic
- Third place: Italy
- Fourth place: Germany

Tournament statistics
- Games played: 29
- Attendance: 3,637 (125 per game)

The 2011 European Junior Baseball Championship was an under-18 international baseball competition held in Gijón, Spain from July 4 to July 10, 2011. It featured teams from Belgium, Czech Republic, France, Germany, Italy, Lithuania, Netherlands, Russia, Spain and Ukraine.

== Round 1 ==
=== Pool A ===
==== Standings ====
Teams	W	L	Pct.	GB	R	RA
Germany	3	1	.750	—	40	17
Italy	3	1	.750	—	29	9
Russia	2	2	.500	1	13	25
Ukraine	2	2	.500	1	15	22
Belgium	0	4	.000	3	18	42

==== Schedule and results ====
July 4, 2011	Italy	11 – 1 (F/8)	Ukraine	La Morgal, Spain; Attendance: 225
July 4, 2011		Boxscore		La Morgal, Spain; Attendance: 225

July 4, 2011	Belgium	7 – 17 (F/8)	Germany	La Morgal, Spain; Attendance: 150
July 4, 2011		Boxscore		La Morgal, Spain; Attendance: 150

July 5, 2011	Russia	0 – 13 (F/7)	Germany	La Morgal, Spain; Attendance: 104
July 5, 2011		Boxscore		La Morgal, Spain; Attendance: 104

July 5, 2011	Ukraine	3 – 1	Belgium	La Morgal, Spain; Attendance: 82
July 5, 2011		Boxscore		La Morgal, Spain; Attendance: 82

July 6, 2011	Germany	6 – 9 (F/10)	Ukraine	La Morgal, Spain; Attendance: 12
July 6, 2011		Boxscore		La Morgal, Spain; Attendance: 12

July 6, 2011	Italy	3 – 1	Russia	La Morgal, Spain; Attendance: 62
July 6, 2011		Boxscore		La Morgal, Spain; Attendance: 62

July 7, 2011	Russia	8 – 7	Belgium	La Morgal, Spain; Attendance: 84
July 7, 2011		Boxscore		La Morgal, Spain; Attendance: 84

July 7, 2011	Germany	4 – 1	Italy	La Morgal, Spain; Attendance: 150
July 7, 2011		Boxscore		La Morgal, Spain; Attendance: 150

July 8, 2011	Ukraine	2 – 4	Russia	La Morgal, Spain; Attendance: 45
July 8, 2011		Boxscore		La Morgal, Spain; Attendance: 45

July 8, 2011	Belgium	3 – 14 (F/7)	Italy	La Morgal, Spain; Attendance: 70
July 8, 2011		Boxscore		La Morgal, Spain; Attendance: 70

=== Pool B ===
==== Standings ====
Teams	W	L	Pct.	GB	R	RA
Netherlands	4	0	1.000	—	34	2
Czech Republic	2	2	.500	2	25	22
Spain	2	2	.500	2	21	18
France	2	2	.500	2	16	30
Lithuania	0	4	.000	4	14	38

==== Schedule and results ====
July 4, 2011	Netherlands	10 – 0 (F/8)	Czech Republic	Gijón, Spain; Attendance: 154
July 4, 2011		Boxscore		Gijón, Spain; Attendance: 154

July 4, 2011	Lithuania	5 – 8	Spain	Gijón, Spain; Attendance: 250
July 4, 2011		Boxscore		Gijón, Spain; Attendance: 250

July 5, 2011	Czech Republic	7 – 2	Lithuania	Gijón, Spain; Attendance: 58
July 5, 2011		Boxscore		Gijón, Spain; Attendance: 58

July 5, 2011	France	6 – 5	Spain	Gijón, Spain; Attendance: 226
July 5, 2011		Boxscore		Gijón, Spain; Attendance: 226

July 6, 2011	Netherlands	7 – 1	France	Gijón, Spain; Attendance: 147
July 6, 2011		Boxscore		Gijón, Spain; Attendance: 147

July 6, 2011	Spain	8 – 6	Czech Republic	Gijón, Spain; Attendance: 175
July 6, 2011		Boxscore		Gijón, Spain; Attendance: 175

July 7, 2011	France	7 – 6 (F/10)	Lithuania	Gijón, Spain; Attendance: 78
July 7, 2011		Boxscore		Gijón, Spain; Attendance: 78

July 7, 2011	Spain	0 – 1	Netherlands	Gijón, Spain; Attendance: 243
July 7, 2011		Boxscore		Gijón, Spain; Attendance: 243

July 8, 2011	Lithuania	1 – 16 (F/5)	Netherlands	Gijón, Spain; Attendance: 28
July 8, 2011		Boxscore		Gijón, Spain; Attendance: 28

July 8, 2011	Czech Republic	12 – 2 (F/7)	France	Gijón, Spain; Attendance: 173
July 8, 2011		Boxscore		Gijón, Spain; Attendance: 173

== Round 2 ==
=== Pool C ===
==== Standings ====
Teams	W	L	Pct.	GB	R	RA
Belgium	2	1	.667	—	24	6
Ukraine	2	1	.667	—	16	12
France	2	1	.667	—	19	22
Lithuania	0	3	.000	2	8	27

==== Schedule and results ====
July 9, 2011	Ukraine	5 – 2	Lithuania	Gijón, Spain; Attendance: 21
July 9, 2011		Boxscore		Gijón, Spain; Attendance: 21

July 9, 2011	France	3 – 8	Belgium	La Morgal, Spain; Attendance: 46
July 9, 2011		Boxscore		La Morgal, Spain; Attendance: 46

July 10, 2011	Ukraine	8 – 9 (F/10)	France	La Morgal, Spain; Attendance: 47
July 10, 2011		Boxscore		La Morgal, Spain; Attendance: 47

July 10, 2011	Belgium	15 – 0 (F/6)	Lithuania	La Morgal, Spain; Attendance: 53
July 10, 2011		Boxscore		La Morgal, Spain; Attendance: 53

=== Semi-finals ===
July 9, 2011	Netherlands	4 – 2	Italy	Gijón, Spain; Attendance: 184
July 9, 2011		Boxscore		Gijón, Spain; Attendance: 184

July 9, 2011	Germany	3 – 8	Czech Republic	Gijón, Spain; Attendance: 150
July 9, 2011		Boxscore		Gijón, Spain; Attendance: 150

== Final round ==
=== 5th place game ===
July 9, 2011	Russia	1 – 2	Spain	Gijón, Spain; Attendance: 165
July 9, 2011		Boxscore		Gijón, Spain; Attendance: 165

=== Bronze medal game ===
July 10, 2011	Germany	0 – 5	Italy	Gijón, Spain; Attendance: 83
July 10, 2011		Boxscore		Gijón, Spain; Attendance: 83

=== Gold medal game ===
July 10, 2011	Czech Republic	4 – 10	Netherlands	Gijón, Spain; Attendance: 372
July 10, 2011		Boxscore		Gijón, Spain; Attendance: 372

== Final standings ==
Rk	Team	W	L
1	Netherlands	6	0
Lost in the Final
2	Czech Republic	3	3
Failed to qualify for Final
3	Italy	4	2
4	Germany	3	3
Failed to qualify for Bronze medal game
5	Spain	3	2
6	Russia	2	3
Failed to qualify for the final round
7	France	3	3
8	Ukraine	3	3
9	Belgium	2	4
10	Lithuania	0	6

2011 European Junior Baseball champions

Netherlands
