= Yoimer Camacho =

Venezuelan baseball player (born 1990)

Pericos de Puebla – No. 74
- Pitcher
- Born: 24 February 1990 (age 36); Santa Teresa del Tuy, Miranda, Venezuela
- Bats: Right Throws: Right

Career highlights and awards
- Pitched a no-hitter on 3 June 2023 (LMB)

Yoimer Daniel Camacho Infante (born 24 February 1990) is a Venezuelan professional baseball pitcher for the Pericos de Puebla of the Mexican League. He has also played for the Leones del Caracas of the Venezuelan Professional Baseball League. Camacho represented France in the 2023 World Baseball Classic qualification.

== Career ==
=== Arizona Diamondbacks ===
Camacho was signed by the Arizona Diamondbacks organization in September 2007. He was subsequently assigned to the Dominican Summer League Diamondbacks, where he played from 2008 to 2010. In 2011, Camacho played for the rookie-level Arizona League Diamondbacks, the Yakima Bears of the Northwest League Low-A and the Visalia Rawhide of the High-A California League. In 2012, he played for the Missoula Osprey of the Pioneer League. In 2013, Camacho played for the Hillsboro Hops of the Northwest League and the South Bend Silver Hawks of the Midwest League. On 30 January 2014, Camacho was released by the Diamondbacks organization.

=== Parma Baseball ===
On 15 February 2015, Camacho joined Parma Baseball Club of the Italian Baseball League. He appeared in 14 games with the team, logging a 1–2 record and 3.67 ERA with one save and 47 strikeouts across 41 2/3 innings pitched.

=== San Marino Baseball ===
On 29 January 2016, Camacho signed with San Marino Baseball Club of the Italian Baseball League. He remained with the team through the 2017 season, appearing in 23 games and posting an 8–3 record with two saves, 95 strikeouts, and a 1.96 ERA over 82 2/3 innings pitched.

=== Huskies de Rouen ===
On 1 March 2019, Camacho joined the Huskies de Rouen of the ahead of the 2019 season of the French Division 1 Baseball Championship.

=== Pericos de Puebla ===
On 21 April 2022, after four years of playing only in winter leagues, Camacho joined the Pericos de Puebla of the Mexican League. He finished the season with 35 appearances, a 6–2 record and a 3.13 over 46 innings pitched.

On 3 June 2023, Camacho threw a no-hitter against the Guerreros de Oaxaca in a game that was called after six innings due to inclement weather. It was the fifth no-hitter in the team's history. He later won the 2023 Mexican League championship with the Pericos. In 17 total starts for the Pericos, he compiled an 11–2 record and 3.05 ERA with 75 strikeouts across 97 1/3 innings pitched. Camacho's 11 victories were tied for most in tue league alongside Brandon Brennan of the Tecolotes de los Dos Laredos.

On 20 January 2024, Camacho signed a contract extension with Puebla for the ensuing season. However, in March of the same year, he underwent a shoulder cleaning procedure and missed the entire season. On 4 February 2025, it was reported that Camacho was ready to return to play with Puebla.

== International career ==
Camacho was eligible to represent the France national baseball team as a French resident, having played in the French league. He was selected to be part of the French squad for the 2023 World Baseball Classic qualification. He appeared as a reliever in both of the team's defeats against Great Britain and the Czech Republic, allowing two runs in 2.1 innings pitched for a 7.71 ERA.

== Career statistics ==
=== International ===
Team	Year	G	W	L	IP	H	R	ER	BB	SO	HR	ERA
France	2022	2	0	0	2.1	3	2	2	3	5	0	7.71
Total		2	0	0	2.1	3	2	2	3	5	0	7.71
