= World Baseball Classic qualification =

World Baseball Classic qualification is the process that determines which nations will compete at the World Baseball Classic. Qualification takes place the year prior to the tournament, which itself is played every four years.

Currently, the World Baseball Classic's main tournament includes 20 nations, an expansion from the 16-team fields of the first four WBCs held between 2006 and 2017. For the fifth edition of the WBC, to be held in 2023, the 16 participating nations from 2017 all received automatic berths; the remaining four slots were filled by the winners and runners-up of two six-team qualifying tournaments. Therefore, twenty-eight nations enter the tournament at any point. To date, thirty nations have entered either qualifying or the main tournament, with Argentina becoming the 30th different nation to participate in a WBC event when it debuted in the qualifying round for 2023.

Unlike other international tournaments such as the Olympic baseball, Baseball World Cup, and Premier12, the qualifying tournaments are not arranged on a regional or geographic basis.

== History ==
The 2006 and 2009 tournaments each had the same 16–team field, chosen by invitation. Starting with the 2013 tournament, the top 12 teams from the previous tournament qualified automatically and a qualifying round was added to determine the remaining 4 teams. The qualifiers were organized as four independent modified double-elimination tournaments featuring four teams each. The final game was winner-take-all, even if won by the team emerging from the loser's bracket. That is, the team emerging from the winner's bracket might be eliminated despite losing only one game.

For the 2013 tournament, qualifying tournaments were held in late 2012. The four nations – (Canada, Chinese Taipei, Panama, and South Africa) – that had failed to win games in the 2009 tournament were joined by twelve new invited nations. Canada and Chinese Taipei won their qualifying tournaments to return to the main tournament, while Spain and Brazil qualified to make their World Baseball Classic debuts.

For 2017 qualifying, Australia, Mexico, Spain, and Brazil were relegated to the qualification stage. Previous entrants Panama and South Africa returned, joined by the other invited nations, with the exception of Thailand, who was replaced by Pakistan, who was invited following its 5th-place finish at the 2015 Asian Baseball Championship.

With the fifth edition of the WBC's main tournament expanding from 16 teams to 20, there was no relegation as all 16 participating nations from 2017 were given automatic berths. The qualifying round was reorganized into two six-team tournaments, with the winners and runners-up advancing to the main event. Qualifying for the fifth WBC was originally scheduled for March 2020, with both tournaments planned to take place in Tucson, Arizona. However, the qualifiers, along with the main WBC tournament, were cancelled due to the COVID-19 pandemic.

When the fifth WBC was rescheduled for 2023, the qualifying round was also rescheduled and took place in September and October 2022. However, the composition of the teams changed, with Argentina replacing the Philippines, and the two tournaments were instead hosted in Regensburg, Germany, and Panama City, Panama. The 2023 qualifying tournaments produced three first-time entrants to the WBC in the Czech Republic, Great Britain, and Nicaragua, while Panama earned its first trip back to the main tournament since being relegated in 2009.

Coming out of the 2023 WBC, the qualification setup returned to a relegation model similar to 2013 and 2017. The top 16 finishers from 2023 again received automatic bids to the 2026 WBC, while the four teams which finished in last place in their first-round pools were relegated to the qualifying round. The number of teams competing in the 2026 WBC qualifiers was reduced from 12 to eight, split into two four-team, round-robin tournaments. Three of the four teams relegated from the 2023 WBC successfully re-qualified – Colombia, Nicaragua, and Chinese Taipei. Brazil was the final team to qualify, earning its first WBC berth since 2013. With all qualifying teams having previously appeared in a WBC, the 2026 tournament was the first WBC since 2009 with no first-time entrants.

== First appearance in qualification by team ==
| WBC | Relegated | Invitee | Total |
|---|---|---|---|
| 2013 | Canada; Chinese Taipei; Panama; South Africa | Brazil; Colombia; Czech Republic; France; Germany; Great Britain; Israel; New Zealand; Nicaragua; Philippines; Spain; Thailand | 16 |
| 2017 | Australia; Mexico | Pakistan | 3 |
| 2023 | None | Argentina | 1 |
| 2026 | China | None | 1 |

== National teams results in World Baseball Classic qualification ==
The table is accurate through the completion of 2026 World Baseball Classic qualification.

| Team | Part | Pld | W | L | PCT |
|---|---|---|---|---|---|
| Australia | 1 | 3 | 3 | 0 | 1.000 |
| Canada | 1 | 3 | 3 | 0 | 1.000 |
| Mexico | 1 | 3 | 3 | 0 | 1.000 |
| Israel | 2 | 6 | 5 | 1 | .833 |
| Colombia | 3 | 9 | 7 | 2 | .778 |
| Chinese Taipei | 2 | 7 | 5 | 2 | .714 |
| Brazil | 4 | 14 | 9 | 5 | .643 |
| Nicaragua | 4 | 13 | 8 | 5 | .615 |
| Panama | 3 | 10 | 6 | 4 | .600 |
| Great Britain | 3 | 10 | 6 | 4 | .600 |
| Spain | 4 | 14 | 7 | 7 | .500 |
| Argentina | 1 | 4 | 2 | 2 | .500 |
| Czech Republic | 3 | 9 | 4 | 5 | .444 |
| New Zealand | 3 | 9 | 3 | 6 | .333 |
| Germany | 4 | 13 | 4 | 9 | .308 |
| South Africa | 4 | 12 | 3 | 9 | .250 |
| Philippines | 2 | 5 | 1 | 4 | .200 |
| France | 3 | 7 | 1 | 6 | .143 |
| Thailand | 1 | 2 | 0 | 2 | .000 |
| China | 1 | 3 | 0 | 3 | .000 |
| Pakistan | 2 | 4 | 0 | 4 | .000 |
