= 2023 World Baseball Classic qualification =

International baseball event

World Baseball Classic 2022 Qualifiers

Tournament details
- Countries: Panama; Germany
- Cities: Panama City and Regensburg
- Dates: September 16 – October 5, 2022
- Teams: 12

The qualifying round of the 2023 World Baseball Classic, officially called The World Baseball Classic 2022 Qualifiers was held from 16 September 2022 to 5 October 2022. Teams which participated at the 2017 World Baseball Classic automatically qualified for the 2023 tournament. The qualifying round consisted of two tournaments participated in by six teams each. The qualifiers were planned to be hosted in Tucson, Arizona in the United States but after the delay, the qualifier hosts were changed to the cities of Regensburg, Germany at Armin-Wolf-Arena and Panamá City, Panama at Estadio Rod Carew. Winners and runners-up of each of the two tournaments qualified for the 2023 World Baseball Classic.

The first qualifying tournament was originally scheduled to be held from March 13–18, 2020 and the second from March 20–25, 2020, before the qualifiers' postponement was announced on March 12, 2020, by Major League Baseball due to the COVID-19 pandemic. As the 2021–22 Major League Baseball lockout was resolved in March 2022, Major League Baseball (MLB) and the MLB Players Association agreed that the World Baseball Classic would return in 2023 and that qualifiers would begin in September 2022. MLB announced the schedule of the format in July 2022.

== Qualified teams ==
Qualification status: Qualified for the 2023 World Baseball Classic Participated in the qualifier but failed to qualify

Note: Numbers in parentheses indicate positions in the WBSC World Rankings as of December 31, 2021.

Team	World ranking	Method of qualification	Classic appearance	Previous best position
Australia	10th	2017 World Baseball Classic	5th	Round 1
Canada	12th	2017 World Baseball Classic	5th	Round 1
China	21st	2017 World Baseball Classic	5th	Round 1
Chinese Taipei	2nd	2017 World Baseball Classic	5th	Round 2 (2013)
Colombia	11th	2017 World Baseball Classic	2nd	Round 1
Cuba	9th	2017 World Baseball Classic	5th	Runners-up (2006)
Dominican Republic	7th	2017 World Baseball Classic	5th	Champions (2013)
Italy	17th	2017 World Baseball Classic	5th	Round 2 (2013)
Israel	20th	2017 World Baseball Classic	2nd	Round 2 (2017)
Japan	1st	2017 World Baseball Classic	5th	Champions (2006, 2009)
Mexico	4th	2017 World Baseball Classic	5th	Round 2 (2006, 2009)
Netherlands	8th	2017 World Baseball Classic	5th	Fourth place (2013, 2017)
Puerto Rico	16th	2017 World Baseball Classic	5th	Runners-up (2013, 2017)
South Korea	3rd	2017 World Baseball Classic	5th	Runners-up (2009)
United States	5th	2017 World Baseball Classic	5th	Champions (2017)
Venezuela	6th	2017 World Baseball Classic	5th	Third place (2009)
Great Britain	23rd	Qualifier 1 Winners	1st	
Czech Republic	14th	Qualifier 1 Runners-up	1st	
Panama	13th	Qualifier 2 Winners	3rd	Round 1
Nicaragua	15th	Qualifier 2 Runners-up	1st	

== Venues ==
Pool A	2023 World Baseball Classic qualification is located in Germany	2023 World Baseball Classic qualification is located in Panama	Pool B
Regensburg, Germany	2023 World Baseball Classic qualification is located in Germany	2023 World Baseball Classic qualification is located in Panama	Panama City, Panama
Armin-Wolf-Arena	2023 World Baseball Classic qualification is located in Germany	2023 World Baseball Classic qualification is located in Panama	Rod Carew Stadium
Capacity: 3,200	2023 World Baseball Classic qualification is located in Germany	2023 World Baseball Classic qualification is located in Panama	Capacity: 27,000

== Pools composition ==
Note: Numbers in parentheses indicate positions in the WBSC World Rankings as of July 2022.

Pool A	Pool B
Germany (18) (hosts)	Panama (13) (hosts)
Czech Republic (14)	Nicaragua (15)
Spain (19)	Brazil (25)
France (22)	Argentina (27)
Great Britain (23)	Pakistan (31)
South Africa (26)	New Zealand (46)

The format was double-elimination. Each pool contained six teams, two of which are given a bye to the second round. The highest ranked teams in the WBSC World Rankings (the Czech Republic and Germany in Pool A, and Panama and Nicaragua in Pool B) received the byes.

Four of the teams had previously participated in the main WBC tournament: Panama and South Africa in 2006 and 2009 (which were by invitation), and Brazil and Spain in 2013. All four had participated in all qualifying tournaments.

Argentina played in WBC qualifiers for the first time, replacing the Philippines, which appeared in previous qualifying tournaments held in 2012 and 2016. The other 11 teams had all previously participated in WBC qualifying. Two have previously won their qualifying group and qualified for the main tournament (Brazil, Spain), six have previously finished as high as second in their qualifying group (Germany, Great Britain, New Zealand, Nicaragua, Panama, South Africa), Two have previously finished as high as third in their qualifying group (Czech Republic, France), and one has previously finished last in its qualifying group (Pakistan).

== Qualifying round ==
=== Pool A ===
Opening Round
–	South Africa	4
–	Spain	5
–	Great Britain	14
–	France	4
Lower round 1
L2	France	1
L3	Czech Republic	7
L1	South Africa	5
L4	Germany	11

Semifinals
–	Czech Republic	7
W1	Spain	21
–	Germany	1
W2	Great Britain	8
Lower round 2
W5	Czech Republic	8
W6	Germany	4

Qualifier
W3	Spain	9
W4	Great Britain	10
Lower final
L8	Spain	1
W7	Czech Republic	3

Date	Local time	Road team	Score	Home team	Inn.	Venue	Game duration	Attendance	Boxscore
Sept. 16, 2022	13:00	South Africa	4–5	Spain		Armin-Wolf-Arena	3:10	883	Boxscore
Sept. 16, 2022	19:00	Great Britain	14–4	France	8	Armin-Wolf-Arena	3:49	897	Boxscore
Sept. 17, 2022	13:00	Spain	21–7	Czech Republic	7	Armin-Wolf-Arena	3:05	1,725	Boxscore
Sept. 17, 2022	19:00	Great Britain	8–1	Germany		Armin-Wolf-Arena	3:28	2,216	Boxscore
Sept. 18, 2022	13:00	France	1–7	Czech Republic		Armin-Wolf-Arena	3:14	911	Boxscore
Sept. 19, 2022	12:00	South Africa	5–11	Germany		Armin-Wolf-Arena	3:11	920	Boxscore
Sept. 20, 2022	13:00	Germany	4–8	Czech Republic*		Armin-Wolf-Arena	3:00	1,102	Boxscore
Sept. 20, 2022	19:00	Spain	9–10	Great Britain*	10	Armin-Wolf-Arena	4:15	1,186	Boxscore
Sept. 21, 2022	19:00	Czech Republic	3–1	Spain		Armin-Wolf-Arena	2:52	1,229	Boxscore

*Home team designation determined by coin toss.

=== Pool B ===
Opening Round
–	New Zealand	7
–	Brazil	12
–	Pakistan	4
–	Argentina	7
Lower round 1
L2	Pakistan	0
L3	Nicaragua	12
L1	New Zealand	1
L4	Argentina	4

Semifinals
–	Nicaragua	1
W1	Brazil	4
–	Panama	11
W2	Argentina	0
Lower round 2
W5	Nicaragua	6
W6	Argentina	5

Qualifier
W3	Brazil	0
W4	Panama	4
Lower final
L8	Brazil	1
W7	Nicaragua	3

Date	Local time	Road team	Score	Home team	Inn.	Venue	Game duration	Attendance	Boxscore
Sept. 30, 2022	12:00	New Zealand	7–12	Brazil		Estadio Nacional de Panamá	3:17	105	Boxscore
Sept. 30, 2022	19:00	Pakistan	4–7	Argentina		Estadio Nacional de Panamá	3:33	466	Boxscore
Oct. 1, 2022	12:00	Brazil	4–1	Nicaragua		Estadio Nacional de Panamá	3:48	695	Boxscore
Oct. 1, 2022	20:00	Argentina	0–11	Panama	7	Estadio Nacional de Panamá	2:24	5,314	Boxscore
Oct. 2, 2022	12:00	Pakistan	0–12	Nicaragua	7	Estadio Nacional de Panamá	2:32	495	Boxscore
Oct. 2, 2022	19:00	New Zealand	1–4	Argentina		Estadio Nacional de Panamá	2:43	193	Boxscore
Oct. 4, 2022	10:00	Argentina	5–6	Nicaragua*		Estadio Nacional de Panamá	3:20	185	Boxscore
Oct. 4, 2022	20:00	Brazil	0–4	Panama*		Estadio Nacional de Panamá	3:09	6,789	Boxscore
Oct. 5, 2022	19:00	Nicaragua	3–1	Brazil		Estadio Nacional de Panamá	3:21	769	Boxscore

*Home team designation determined by coin toss.
