= 2013 World Baseball Classic qualification =

Tournament details
- Countries: Germany; Panama; Taiwan; United States
- Dates: September 19 – November 19, 2012
- Teams: 16

Tournament statistics
- Games played: 24
- Attendance: 103,774 (4,324 per game)

The qualifying round of the 2013 World Baseball Classic was held from September 19 to November 19, 2012. It was the first ever qualifiers for the tournament.

Although the 2006 and 2009 editions of the World Baseball Classic were contested by the same pre-selected field of 16 teams, for the 2013 tournament only the 12 teams that won at least one game in 2009 were guaranteed a berth in the main tournament. Due to an agreement with then International Baseball Federation (now World Baseball Softball Confederation), other four (Canada, Chinese Taipei, Panama, and South Africa) contested the qualifying round along with 12 additional teams invited by the confederation.

The qualifiers were organized as four independent modified double-elimination tournaments featuring four teams each. The final game was winner-take-all, even if won by the team emerging from the loser's bracket. That is, the team emerging from the winner's bracket might be eliminated despite losing only one game (as, in fact, happened to Israel in Qualifier 1).

Canada and Chinese Taipei dominated in Qualifiers 2 and 4 to advance easily. In Qualifier 1, Spain and Israel both won in the first round, then Israel beat Spain in the winner's bracket. Spain then eliminated South Africa (the only team in the qualifier to have previously contested the WBC) to earn a rematch with Israel, which was without its several Major League players due to the qualifier taking place during the MLB season. Spain won the winner-take-all final game, 9–7 in 10 innings, to advance to the main tournament.

In Qualifier 3, favorites Panama and Nicaragua lost in the first round, and Panama then eliminated Nicaragua. After both teams defeated Colombia, underdog Brazil defeated Panama 1–0 to advance to the main tournament.

== Players ==
Under the Classic's rules, Team Israel was entitled to have non-Israeli citizens of Jewish heritage play for the team. Such players included major leaguers catcher Ryan Lavarnway, first baseman Ike Davis, second basemen Ian Kinsler and Josh Satin, third basemen Kevin Youkilis and Danny Valencia, outfielders Ryan Braun (whose father is Israeli), Sam Fuld, Ryan Kalish, and Gabe Kapler, and pitchers Jason Marquis, Scott Feldman, Craig Breslow, and John Grabow, as well as what were then recent major leaguers catcher Brad Ausmus and pitcher Scott Schoeneweis. Kinsler said:

"Wow, I would be happy to play for Team Israel.... The truth is that if a proposal comes from Team USA to play for them, I will have a very difficult decision to make. Yuk [Kevin Youkilis], Braun [Ryan Braun], and I could make a fantastic team. I am sure that I'll talk it over with Yuk – we always laugh about things like this."

Outfielder Shawn Green, who retired in 2007, was also eligible because he is Jewish. In early June 2011 he said it "would be an honor" and he "would love to" play for Israel in the Classic.

Because they were held in September, while the Major League Baseball season was still in progress, Qualifiers 1 and 2 could not feature major league players. Kevin Youkilis announced that he would play for the team if they made it past the qualifying round.

The highest-level players involved in Qualifiers 1 and 2 were minor-league prospects ranked among the top 20 in their respective organizations. Team Israel, managed by former major league All Star Brad Ausmus, included minor league pitchers Eric Berger (1–0) and Brett Lorin, first baseman Nate Freiman (.417; 4 HR in 12 AB), second baseman Josh Satin (.273), shortstops Jake Lemmerman and Ben Orloff, and outfielders Adam Greenberg, Ben Guez, Joc Pederson (.308), and Robbie Widlansky. Retired major leaguer Shawn Green played for Israel (.333).

Similarly, Joey Votto and Justin Morneau were unable to play for Canada. They were led by minor league first baseman Jimmy Van Ostrand (.538; 10 RBIs in 13 at-bats). Although Canada advanced easily despite the unavailability of its Major Leaguers, Israel was eliminated after narrowly losing the final game to Spain.

By contrast, all four teams in Qualifier 3 boasted Major League players, as it took place in November and did not conflict with the MLB season. Established Major Leaguers included Carlos Ruiz, Rubén Tejada, Manny Acosta, Manny Corpas, and Carlos Lee of Panama; and Everth Cabrera and J. C. Ramírez of Nicaragua. Major League rookies and prospects included Erasmo Ramírez and Cheslor Cuthbert of Nicaragua; Yan Gomes of Brazil; and Luis Martinez and brothers Donavan and Jhonatan Solano of Colombia. Retired Major Leaguers included Ramiro Mendoza of Panama and Édgar Rentería of Colombia.

Although Qualifier 4 also took place in November, it did not feature any current MLB players, as both Wei-Yin Chen and Chien-Ming Wang of Chinese Taipei elected to skip the qualifier. Chinese Taipei did feature Japanese major leaguer Yao-Hsun Yang as well as Taiwanese league players such as Peng Cheng-min and Lin Chih-sheng, and qualified easily. Both New Zealand and the Philippines included minor league players, while Thailand included former Major Leaguer Johnny Damon.

== Venues ==
Four stadiums were used during the qualifying round:

Qualifier 1	Qualifier 2	Qualifier 3	Qualifier 4
Jupiter, United States	Regensburg, Germany	Panama City, Panama	New Taipei City, Taiwan
Roger Dean Stadium	Armin-Wolf-Arena	Rod Carew Stadium	Xinzhuang Baseball Stadium
Capacity: 6,871	Capacity: 10,000	Capacity: 27,000	Capacity: 12,500

== Pools composition ==
Note: Numbers in parentheses indicate positions in the WBSC World Rankings at the time of the tournament.

Qualifier 1	Qualifier 2	Qualifier 3	Qualifier 4
France (30)	Canada (6)	Brazil (20)	Chinese Taipei (5)
Israel (74)	Czech Republic (25)	Colombia (19)	New Zealand (28)
South Africa (27)	Germany (17)	Nicaragua (15)	Philippines (22)
Spain (16)	Great Britain (21)	Panama (14)	Thailand (23)

== Qualifying round ==
=== Qualifier 1 ===
Preliminaries
–	Israel	7
–	South Africa	3
–	France	0
–	Spain	8
Lower round 1
L1	South Africa	5
L2	France	2

Semifinals
W1	Israel	4
W2	Spain	2
Lower final
W4	South Africa	3
L3	Spain	13

Qualifier
W3	Israel	7
W5	Spain	9

Date	Local time	Road team	Score	Home team	Inn.	Venue	Game duration	Attendance	Boxscore
Sep 19, 2012	19:00	Israel	7–3	South Africa		Roger Dean Stadium	3:16	1,581	Boxscore
Sep 20, 2012	19:00	France	0–8	Spain		Roger Dean Stadium	2:51	975	Boxscore
Sep 21, 2012	13:00	Israel	4–2	Spain		Roger Dean Stadium	2:43	814	Boxscore
Sep 21, 2012	19:00	South Africa	5–2	France	11	Roger Dean Stadium	3:57	922	Boxscore
Sep 22, 2012	19:00	Spain	13–3	South Africa		Roger Dean Stadium	3:11	1,183	Boxscore
Sep 23, 2012	17:00	Spain	9–7	Israel	10	Roger Dean Stadium	4:50	4,463	Boxscore

=== Qualifier 2 ===
Preliminaries
–	Great Britain	1
–	Canada	11
–	Czech Republic	1
–	Germany	16
Lower round 1
L1	Great Britain	12
L2	Czech Republic	5

Semifinals
W1	Canada	16
W2	Germany	7
Lower final
W3	Great Britain	1
L4	Germany	16

Qualifier
W4	Canada	11
W5	Germany	1

Date	Local time	Road team	Score	Home team	Inn.	Venue	Game duration	Attendance	Boxscore
Sep 20, 2012	19:00	Great Britain	1–11	Canada	7	Armin-Wolf-Arena	2:28	3,704	Boxscore
Sep 21, 2012	19:00	Czech Republic	1–16	Germany	6	Armin-Wolf-Arena	2:15	3,019	Boxscore
Sep 22, 2012	13:00	Great Britain	12–5	Czech Republic		Armin-Wolf-Arena	3:10	1,806	Boxscore
Sep 22, 2012	19:00	Canada	16–7	Germany		Armin-Wolf-Arena	4:00	4,085	Boxscore
Sep 23, 2012	14:00	Germany	16–1	Great Britain	7	Armin-Wolf-Arena	2:35	1,452	Boxscore
Sep 24, 2012	19:00	Germany	1–11	Canada	8	Armin-Wolf-Arena	2:33	3,120	Boxscore

=== Qualifier 3 ===
Preliminaries
–	Brazil	3
–	Panama	2
–	Nicaragua	1
–	Colombia	8
Lower round 1
L1	Panama	6
L2	Nicaragua	2

Semifinals
W1	Brazil	7
W2	Colombia	1
Lower final
W4	Panama	9
L3	Colombia	7

Qualifier
W3	Brazil	1
W5	Panama	0

Date	Local time	Road team	Score	Home team	Inn.	Venue	Game duration	Attendance	Boxscore
Nov 15, 2012	20:00	Brazil	3–2	Panama		Rod Carew Stadium	3:23	13,728	Boxscore
Nov 16, 2012	20:00	Nicaragua	1–8	Colombia		Rod Carew Stadium	3:31	4,028	Boxscore
Nov 17, 2012	14:00	Colombia	1–7	Brazil		Rod Carew Stadium	3:33	2,952	Boxscore
Nov 17, 2012	20:00	Nicaragua	2–6	Panama		Rod Carew Stadium	3:46	8,531	Boxscore
Nov 18, 2012	19:00	Panama	9–7	Colombia		Rod Carew Stadium	3:30	5,317	Boxscore
Nov 19, 2012	20:00	Panama	0–1	Brazil		Rod Carew Stadium	2:38	10,638	Boxscore

=== Qualifier 4 ===
Preliminaries
–	Philippines	8
–	Thailand	2
–	New Zealand	0
–	Chinese Taipei	10
Lower round 1
L1	Thailand	2
L2	New Zealand	12

Semifinals
W1	Philippines	0
W2	Chinese Taipei	16
Lower final
W3	New Zealand	10
L4	Philippines	6

Qualifier
W4	Chinese Taipei	9
W5	New Zealand	0

Date	Local time	Road team	Score	Home team	Inn.	Venue	Game duration	Attendance	Boxscore
Nov 15, 2012	11:30	Philippines	8–2	Thailand		Xinzhuang Baseball Stadium	3:10	923	Boxscore
Nov 15, 2012	18:30	New Zealand	0–10	Chinese Taipei	7	Xinzhuang Baseball Stadium	2:29	9,788	Boxscore
Nov 16, 2012	11:30	New Zealand	12–2	Thailand	8	Xinzhuang Baseball Stadium	3:05	1,168	Boxscore
Nov 16, 2012	18:30	Chinese Taipei	16–0	Philippines	7	Xinzhuang Baseball Stadium	2:56	10,911	Boxscore
Nov 17, 2012	14:00	New Zealand	10–6	Philippines		Xinzhuang Baseball Stadium	3:13	503	Boxscore
Nov 18, 2012	14:00	New Zealand	0–9	Chinese Taipei		Xinzhuang Baseball Stadium	3:31	8,163	Boxscore

== Attendance ==
103,774 (avg. 4,324; pct. 30.7%)

- Qualifier 1 – 9,938 (avg. 1,656; pct. 24.1%)
- Qualifier 2 – 17,186 (avg. 2,864; pct. 28.6%)
- Qualifier 3 – 45,194 (avg. 7,532; pct. 27.9%)
- Qualifier 4 – 31,456 (avg. 5,243; pct. 41.9%)

== Statistics leaders ==
=== Batting ===
Statistic	Name	Total/Avg
Batting average*	(Czech Republic) Mike Cervenak	.714
Hits	7 Players	7
Runs	(Canada) Jimmy Van Ostrand	9
Home runs	(Israel) Nate Freiman (Canada) Jimmy Van Ostrand	4
RBI	(Canada) Jimmy Van Ostrand	10
Walks	(Chinese Taipei) Szu-Chi Chou (South Africa) Gift Ngoepe	6
Strikeouts	(New Zealand) Boss Moanaroa	7
Stolen bases	(New Zealand) Alan Schoenberger	5
On-base percentage*	(Czech Republic) Mike Cervenak	.750
Slugging percentage*	(Canada) Jimmy Van Ostrand	1.538
OPS*	(Canada) Jimmy Van Ostrand	2.138

* Minimum 2.7 plate appearances per game

=== Pitching ===
Statistic	Name	Total/Avg
Wins	24 Players	1
Losses	24 Players	1
Saves	(Brazil) Thyago Vieira	2
Innings pitched	(Panama) Ramiro Mendoza	8.2
Hits allowed	(Israel) Eric Berger	10
Runs allowed	(Philippines) Charlie Labrador (South Africa) Kieran Lovegrove (Czech Republic) Michael Sobotka	7
Earned runs allowed	(South Africa) Kieran Lovegrove	7
ERA*	(Panama) Ramiro Mendoza	0.00**
Walks	(Thailand) Siraphop Nadee (Brazil) Andre Rienzo	5
Strikeouts	(Germany) Enorbel Marquez	8
WHIP*	(Germany) Enorbel Marquez	0.29

* Minimum 0.8 innings pitched per game
** Mendoza is tied with 27 others with a 0.00 ERA but he pitched the most innings with 8.2

== Additional rules ==
A pitcher threw no more than 85 pitches per game in the qualifying round unless the pitcher needed more to complete a batter's plate appearance.

A pitcher must:

- Not pitch until a minimum of four days have passed since he last pitched, if he threw 50 or more pitches when he last pitched;
- Not pitch until a minimum of one day has passed since he last pitched, if he threw 30 or more pitches when he last pitched;
- Not pitch until a minimum of one day has passed since any second consecutive day on which the pitcher pitched;

A mercy rule came into effect when one team led by either fifteen runs after five innings, or ten runs after seven innings.

An alternative version of the IBAF's extra inning rule was also used. If after 12 innings the score was still tied, each half inning thereafter would have started with runners on second and first base. The runners would have been the eighth and ninth hitters due in that inning respectively. For example, if the number five hitter was due to lead off the inning, the number three hitter would have been on second base, and the number four hitter on first base. However, this rule was never actually employed in this year's qualifiers, as the two extra-inning games in the qualifying round ended prior to a 13th inning.
