= Poland national under-18 baseball team =

Poland Baseball U-18

Information
- Country: Poland
- Confederation: WBSC Europe

WBSC ranking
- Current: 54 (26 October 2026)

The Poland national under-18 baseball team is the national under-18 team representing Poland in international baseball competitions. The organization is currently ranked 58th in the world by the World Baseball Softball Confederation. They compete in the bi-annual European Junior Baseball Championship.

== See also ==
- Poland national baseball team
- U-18 Baseball World Cup
