= Lithuania national under-18 baseball team =

Lithuania Baseball U-18

Information
- Country: Lithuania
- Confederation: WBSC Europe

WBSC ranking
- Current: 51 (26 October 2026)

The Lithuania national under-18 baseball team is the national under-18 team representing Lithuania in international baseball competitions. The organization is currently ranked 37th in the world by the World Baseball Softball Confederation. They compete in the bi-annual U-18 European Baseball Championship.

== See also ==
- Lithuania national baseball team
- U-18 Baseball World Cup
