= Ukraine national under-18 baseball team =

Ukraine Baseball U-18

Information
- Country: Ukraine
- Confederation: WBSC Europe

WBSC ranking
- Current: 74 ▼1 (26 October 2026)

The Ukraine national under-18 baseball team is the national under-18 team representing Ukraine in international baseball competitions. The organization is currently ranked 29th in the world by the World Baseball Softball Confederation. They compete in the bi-annual European Junior Baseball Championship.

== See also ==
- Ukraine national baseball team
- U-18 Baseball World Cup
