= Slovakia national under-18 baseball team =

Slovakia Baseball U-18

Information
- Country: Slovakia
- Confederation: WBSC Europe

WBSC ranking
- Current: 45 (26 October 2026)

The Slovakia national under-18 baseball team is the national under-18 team representing Slovakia in international baseball competitions. The organization is currently ranked 35th in the world by the World Baseball Softball Confederation. They compete in the bi-annual U-18 Baseball World Cup.

== See also ==
- Slovakia national baseball team
- U-18 Baseball World Cup
