= Darwín Ramírez =

Uruguayan footballer (born 1988)

Jesús Darwin Ramírez Umpierrez (born 12 July 1988) is a Uruguayan former professional footballer who played as a forward.

== Career ==
Ramirez was born in Montevideo. He played in Peru with Club Universidad Técnica de Cajamarca and Sport Rosario.

== Teams ==
- (Uruguay) Central Español 2008–2009
- (Uruguay) Defensor Sporting 2010
- (Uruguay) Central Español 2011
- (Uruguay) El Tanque Sisley 2011
- (Belgium) Visé 2011
- (Uruguay) El Tanque Sisley 2012
- (Mexico) Estudiantes Tecos 2012
- (Uruguay) Villa Teresa 2012–2013
- (Guatemala) Cobán Imperial 2014
- (Guatemala) Cobán Imperial 2015
- (Uruguay) El Tanque Sisley 2016
- (Peru) UTC Cajamarca 2016
- (Peru) Sport Rosario 2017
- Villa Española 2019
