= Russia national under-18 baseball team =

Russia Baseball U-18

Information
- Country: Russia
- Confederation: WBSC Europe

WBSC ranking
- Current: NR (26 October 2026)

The Russia national under-18 baseball team is the national under-18 team representing Russia in international baseball competitions. The organization is currently ranked 28th in the world by the World Baseball Softball Confederation. They compete in the bi-annual U-18 Baseball World Cup. In reaction to the 2022 Russian invasion of Ukraine, WBSC Europe relocated competitions that had been scheduled to be held in Russia during 2022, and excluded Russian teams from all its competitions for both national and club teams to be held in Europe in 2022.

== See also ==
- Russia national baseball team
