= Armin-Wolf-Arena =

Baseball stadium in Regensburg, Germany

Coordinates: 49°01′33″N 12°08′22″E

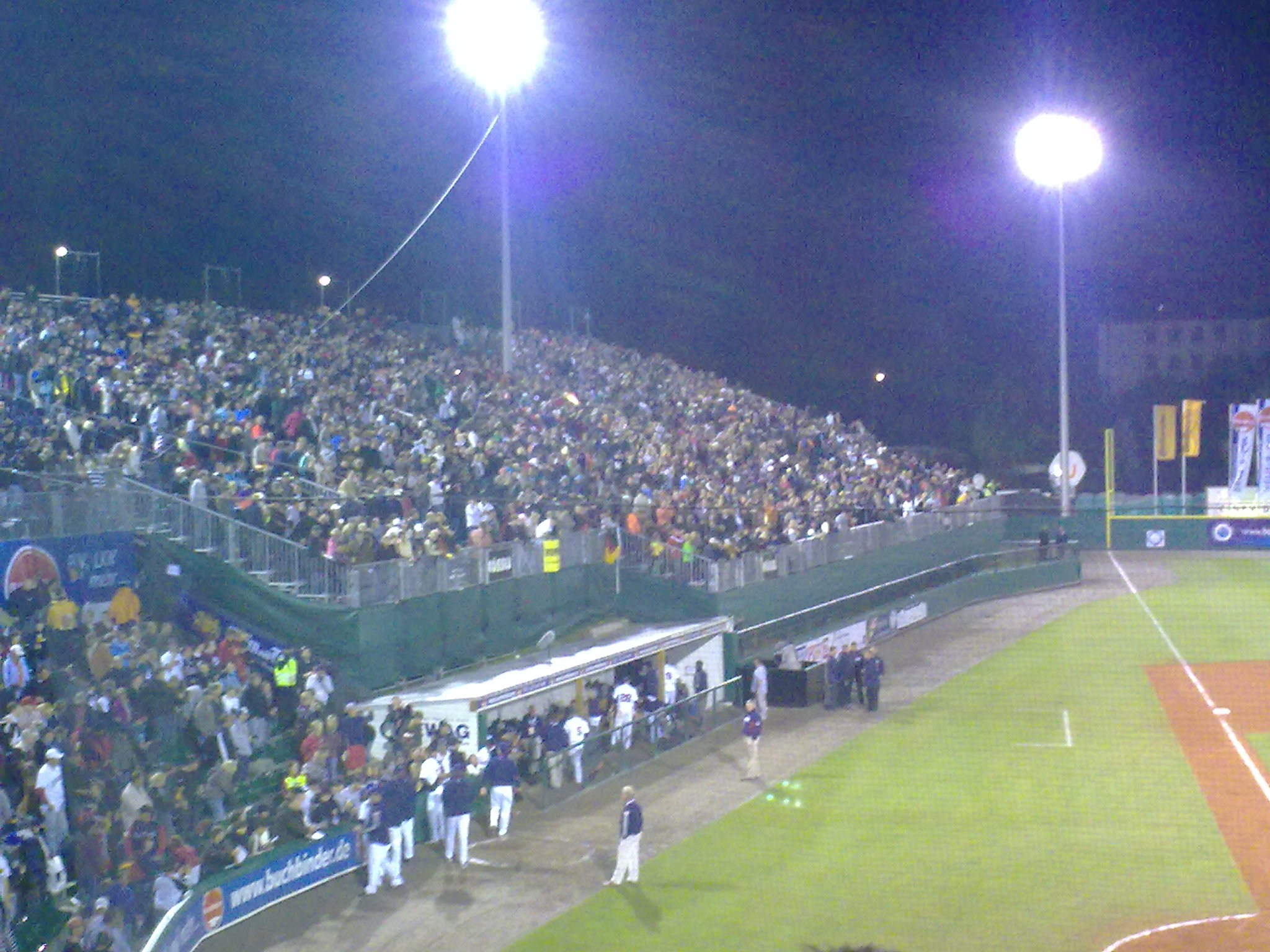
- Interactive map of Armin-Wolf-Arena
- Location: Regensburg, Germany
- Capacity: 3,100 (11,548 during the 2009 Baseball World Cup)
- Field size: Left Field Line - 98m Center Field - 123m Right Field Line - 98m

Construction
- Opened: 1998

Tenants
- Guggenberger Legionäre Regensburg (Bundesliga Baseball)

Armin-Wolf-Arena is a baseball stadium located in Regensburg, Germany. It was built in 1996 and has a capacity of 3,100 spectators. It hosts the home games of Guggenberger Legionäre Regensburg of the Bundesliga Baseball and has hosted the 2009 Baseball World Cup and the German qualifying round of the 2013 and 2023 editions of the World Baseball Classic.

== See also ==
- 2013 World Baseball Classic
- 2023 World Baseball Classic
