= France national baseball team =

Information
- Country: France
- Federation: FFBS
- Confederation: CEB
- Manager: Bruce Bochy

WBSC ranking
- Current: 25 (26 March 2026)
- Highest: 21 (latest in December 2023)
- Lowest: 30 (December 2012)

Uniforms
Home	Away

World Cup
- Appearances: 3 (first in 1994)
- Best result: 15th

Intercontinental Cup
- Appearances: 3 (first in 1991)
- Best result: 7th

European Championship
- Appearances: 24 (first in 1955)
- Best result: (bronze) 3rd (1 time, in 1999)

The France national baseball team (French: Équipe de France de baseball), also known as Les Bleus (The Blues), represents the French Federation of Baseball and Softball in international competitions, such as the World Baseball Classic, the European Baseball Championship, and the World Cup of Baseball. They are currently ranked 21st in the world.

== Roster ==
France roster – 2023 World Baseball Classic Qualification
Players		Coaches
Pitchers: 27 Yoimer Camacho; 22 Kevin Canelon; 34 Gédéon Coste; 28 Jhon Garcia; 38 Marc-André Habeck; 6 Mathias Lacombe; 29 Yorfrank López; 26 Robinson Maestre; 11 Quentin Moulin; 23 Owen Ozanich; 20 José Paula; 8 Shane Priest; 17 Esteban Prioul; 31 Keivi Rojas; 10 Kenjiro Sugiura	Catchers: 24 Iván Acuña; 12 Fabian Kovacs; 13 Nolan Soliveres; Infielders: 7 Alfredo Angarita; 14 Daniel Patrice; 4 Alexander Perdomo; 3 Daniel Rosell; 2 Yeixon Ruíz; 19 Ariel Soriano; Outfielders: 9 Paolo Brossier; 30 Bastien Dagneau; 21 Léo Jiminian; 16 Maël Zan	Manager: Bruce Bochy; Coaches: Joe Bochy (Bench); Keino Pérez (Pitching); Boris Rothermundt (Coach); Steve Smith (First Base); Ron Wotus (Third Base)

== History ==
The history of the French team began in 1929 with their first official game against Spain in Barcelona with a 10–6 victory. The team made its debut in competition in 1955 when it played in the finals of the second European Baseball Championship, finishing fifth out of five teams.

The French team has qualified for the World Cup finals three times, the first time in 1994. In order to qualify for the finals a playoff game was played against South Africa. France lost seven games during the competition, and finished in 16th place out of 16 teams. In 2001, as well as 2003, les Bleus (the nickname of the team) made their way into the World Cup finals. During the 2001 edition the French team finished in 15th place, tied for last with the Philippines. They also finished in 15th place in 2003, out of 15 teams.

In the fall of 2012, France participated in their first World Baseball Classic Qualifier. The team played in the Jupiter, Florida, pool alongside South Africa, Spain, and Israel. France lost both its games to Spain and South Africa.

In September 2013, France named former MLB pitcher Éric Gagné new head coach. The team played a series of trial games in Florida in October 2013 and in Phoenix, Arizona, in March 2014 in preparation for the 2014 European Championships. In early September 2014, France hosted the inaugural France International Baseball Tournament. France won the first exhibition game 8–7 vs. Japan before claiming game 1 6–3 over Belgium and game 2 10–5, again over Japan. "Les Bleus" claimed their first-ever victory over the Netherlands with a 12–8 win on 8 September 2014, before falling 3–2 against the Dutch in the championship game the following night.

Every two years, France participates in the European Baseball Championship. France's best result came in 1999 when the team finished third. The French National team finished 6th in the 2014 European Championships, going 4–1 in Regensburg, GER before falling to Czech Republic, Holland and Spain in the Brno, CZ.

In March 2015 French pitcher Owen Ozanich was France's lone representative on Team Europe, which split two contests at the Tokyo Dome against Samurai Japan.

In July 2015 France sent many of its national team players to participate in the 2015 World University Summer Games in South Korea. Rouen manager Keino Perez was the manager for this competition. France finished in 8th place. Once back in Europe, the national team played a series of games in Antwerp, Belgium, 23–24 July against Sweden and the host country, Belgium. With a 2–0 record, France won the Flanders invitational tournament with Belgium coming in second and Sweden third.

In November and December 2015 Ozanich along with Leonel Cespedes represented France on Team Europe during the Asian Winter League held in Taichung, Taiwan. Cespedes had a 4.50 ERA out of the bullpen. Ozanich led the team in innings pitched, strikeouts, and ERA.

The French National Team competed in the 2016 World Baseball Classic Qualifiers held in March 2016 in Panama. In game one, Panama beat France behind long-time MLB catcher Carlos Ruiz's two home runs in front of a crowd of over 11,000. In game two, Cespedes pitched France to a victory over European rival Spain at Rod Carew Stadium. The 5–3 victory marked the first win in four tries at the WBC Qualifiers for the French. In the semi-final game, France, led by offensively by first baseman Rene Leveret's home run in the fifth inning, found themselves tied with Panama in the fifth inning, but were not able to close out the game, falling 7–4, ending their hopes of qualifying for the 2017 WBC.

In April 2016 Kieran Mattison replaced Eric Gagne as French National Team Manager. In September 2016, the French Federation hosted the second edition of the France International Baseball Tournament (also known as the Yoshida Challenge), featuring France, Germany, Netherlands, and International Stars. France finished in third place behind Germany and the Netherlands. France finished in 7th place in the 2016 European Championships which were held in Hoofddorp, NL. They beat Croatia, Greece, and Sweden, while falling to Italy, Belgium, and Spain. Third baseman Maxime Lefevre hit .500 for the tournament while P/OF Leonel Cespedes posted a 2–0 record with a 0.64 ERA. French pitchers Owen Ozanich and Marc-Andre Habeck represented France at the 2016 Asian Winter League with Team Europe.

In July 2017 French/Cuban 1B/OF Ernesto Martinez Jr. signed with the Milwaukee Brewers for $880,000, the largest-ever bonus for a French player. The big lefty served as France's designated hitter at just 16 years old in the 2016 WBC Qualifier where he played alongside his father, Ernesto Martinez Sr. a longtime star in the French D1 for Senart. Through the 2025 MiLB season, Martinez, now 26, has hit .262 with 56 HR, 263 RBI and 86 SB and will head to New York Yankees spring training after signing with the club this offseason as a free agent.

In August 2017, the French University team participated in the Summer Universiades in Taipei, Taiwan. The team had a surprise win over the highly favored Chinese Taipei, before falling to Korea and Czech Republic. Overall the team, again coached by Keino Perez finished 7th out of 8.

In November 2018 les bleus, still at that time managed by Kieran Mattison, headed to South Africa for a 7-game series against the South African National Team where they went 2–5 in the seven contests held in Johannesburg, Durban, and Cape Town. Minor league pitcher Yoan Antonac (Phillies) made his national team debut for France. Jose Paula was named to the all series team where he took home best defensive player for the week, Maxime Lefevre led all players in stolen bases.

In September 2019 the French National Team competed in the 2019 European Championships. Maxime Lefevre led the team with a .435 average, followed by Bastien Dagneau (.429), Andy Paz (.400) and Fred Hanvi (.350). France finished in 7th place, beating Austria, Belgium and Croatia, while falling to Italy, Spain, Israel and Germany. On the mound, Marc-Andre Habeck led France in innings pitched (11.0), Leonel Cespedes logged 7.2, and Owen Ozanich 6.0. Habeck also led the staff in strikeouts (12), ahead of Ozanich (5), Yoann Vaugelade (4) and Franklin de la Rosa (4). Daniel Camou and Lilian Amoros each logged three scoreless innings to lead the staff in ERA.

The FFBS shocked the European baseball community when they announced Bruce Bochy would take over as manager of the national team. The announcement came in late 2019, and confirmed rumors that the future Hall of Fame skipper would lead the team in the 2020 World Baseball Classic Qualifier. Due to the worldwide Coronavirus outbreak in March 2020, the WBC qualifiers were postponed to September 2022.

The French national team finished a disappointing 15th (out of 16) in the 2021 European Championships held in Turin, Italy. France lost to Great Britain, Israel, Germany, and Greece. They beat Russia and Slovakia. The team struggled under newly appointed manager Keino Perez, who took over for Bochy. Offensively, only Andy Paz (.364) hit over .300 for a team that hit a collective .167 over 6 games. On the mound, the French did slightly better, with Ozanich leading the team in innings (10.0) and strikeouts (13) while 17 year-old Mathis Nayral allowed just 1 run over 7.1 IP (1.23 ERA) while punching out 7 batters. Outfielder Jose Paula also contributed on the mound, giving up 2 ER in 5.0 IP, striking out 9.

In July 2022, the French national team headed to Bulgaria for the 'B' pool qualifier. France, which needed to win the qualifier in order to again participate in the 2023 European Championships, did just that, sweeping through the competition. Les bleus won the final against host Bulgaria. French flamethrower Mathias LaCombe took home the tournament best pitcher award.

In the fall of 2022, Future Hall of Frame manager Bruce Bochy finally debuted in an official competition at the helm of Les Bleus. The World Baseball Classic qualifier, held in Regensburg, Germany saw France lose in the opening round to Great Britain and Czech Republic, both of whom advanced to the 2023 World Baseball Classic. Ivan Acuna was France's top hitter, going 3-for-5 with a home run and 3 RBI in the two games. On the mound, Esteban Prioul and Jose Paula had scoreless outings, while Yoimer Camacho struck out five batters.

The French national team, managed by Keino Perez, headed to Spain for a series of exhibition games prior to the 2023 European Championships. The 2023 Euros, held in several cities in the Czech Republic, saw France finish 3-3, good for 7th place overall. France could have made a run at a medal if not for a late inning comeback by Germany in the quarterfinals against the French bullpen. Milwaukee Brewers top prospect Ernesto Martinez participated in his first European Championships with France, batting .286 with a homer and 3 RBI. Newly signed White Sox pitcher Mathias LaCombe was one of many French pitchers not available (Habeck, Ozanich and Nayral were also not on the roster). Montpellier lefty Ben Couvreur took home the best pitcher award at just 16 years of age. The 2023 French Series MVP posted a 0.00 ERA in 11.0 innings pitched, striking out 11 batters.

In early November 2023, Bruce Bochy, France's WBC manager, took home the 2023 World Series in his first season at the helm of the Texas Rangers, cementing his future spot in Cooperstown's Baseball Hall of Fame.

In 2025, the French national team competed in the European Championships in Rotterdam, Netherlands. Keino Perez's team finished 0-6. The French did not participate in the 2025 WBC qualifiers after having participated in the 2012, 2016 and 2022 editions.

The 2026 season features three French players in minor league baseball (MILB): Mathias LaCombe (Chicago White Sox organization), Ernesto Martinez Jr. (New York Yankees organization) and Jordan Ouanyou (Cincinnati Reds organization). Mathis Nayral, who played for Kansas University in 2026, was drafted by the Toronto Blue Jays. and Mathis Meurant (Arizona) will lace up the spikes in NCAA Division 1. Owen Ozanich, Julien Monks and Thibault Mercadier all played in the Canadian Baseball League (CBL).

== Results and fixtures ==
The following is a list of professional baseball match results currently active in the latest version of the WBSC World Rankings, as well as any future matches that have been scheduled.

Legend

Win Lose Void or postponed Fixture

=== 2022 ===
World Baseball Classic Q	September 16	Great Britain	14–4 (F/8)	France	Armin-Wolf-Arena, Germany
World Baseball Classic Q	19:00 CET	WP: McKenzie Mills (1-0); HR: Harry Ford (1)	Boxscore	LP: Kevin Canelon (0-1); HR: Ivan Acuna (1)	Attendance: 897; Umpires: Jon Byrne

World Baseball Classic Q	September 18	France	1–7	Czech Republic	Armin-Wolf-Arena, Germany
World Baseball Classic Q	13:00 CET	LP: Marc-Andre Habeck (0-1)	Boxscore	WP: Lukas Ercoli (1-0); HR: Vojtech Mensik (2)	Attendance: 911; Umpires: Mark Winters (HP), Roberto LaMadrid (1B), Kyohei Makita (2B), Young Chou Kwon (3B)

=== 2021 ===
Euro Championship GS	September 12	France	2–7	Great Britain	Avigliana, Italy
Euro Championship GS			Boxscore

Euro Championship GS	September 13	Israel	10–0	France	Avigliana, Italy
Euro Championship GS			Boxscore

Euro Championship GS	September 14	Russia	4–5	France	Turin, Italy
Euro Championship GS			Boxscore

Euro Championship RR	September 15	Germany	3–2	France	Turin, Italy
Euro Championship RR			Boxscore

Euro Championship RR	September 17	Greece	12–9	France	Turin, Italy
Euro Championship RR			Boxscore

Euro Championship 15th	September 18	Slovakia	5–6	France	Settimo Torinese, Italy
Euro Championship 15th			Boxscore

=== 2019 ===
Friendly	August 28	Japan	15–2	France	Hall de Saint-Exupery, Rouen
Friendly			Boxscore

Friendly	August 30	Japan	22–0	France	Gymnase Maréchal, Montigny
Friendly			Boxscore

Friendly	August 31	Japan	15–5	France	Templiers Stadium, Sénart
Friendly			Boxscore

Friendly	September 1	Japan	6–7	France	Templiers Stadium, Sénart
Friendly			Boxscore

Friendly	September 1	Japan	18–8	France	Templiers Stadium, Sénart
Friendly			Boxscore

Euro Championship GS	September 7	France	2–16	Italy	Bonn, Germany
Euro Championship GS	15:30 CET		Boxscore		Attendance: 850

Euro Championship GS	September 8	Austria	6–12	France	Bonn, Germany
Euro Championship GS	13:00 CET		Boxscore		Attendance: 100

Euro Championship GS	September 9	Spain	6–3	France	Solingen, Germany
Euro Championship GS	16:30 CET		Boxscore		Attendance: 150

Euro Championship GS	September 10	Belgium	2–12 (F/8)	France	Bonn, Germany
Euro Championship GS	11:00 CET		Boxscore		Attendance: 80

Euro Championship GS	September 11	France	23–0 (F/5)	Croatia	Solingen, Germany
Euro Championship GS	15:45 CET		Boxscore		Attendance: 150

Euro Championship QF	September 13	Israel	8–2	France	Bonn, Germany
Euro Championship QF	11:00 CET		Boxscore		Attendance: 200

Euro Championship CG	September 14	France	4–14 (F/7)	Germany	Bonn, Germany
Euro Championship CG	11:00 CET		Boxscore		Attendance: 800

=== 2018 ===
Friendly	November 3	France	13–24	South Africa	Boksburg, South Africa
Friendly			Boxscore

Friendly	November 4	France	8–14	South Africa	Boksburg, South Africa
Friendly			Boxscore

Friendly	November 7	France	11–9	South Africa	Durban, South Africa
Friendly			Boxscore

Friendly	November 8	France	5–4	South Africa	Durban, South Africa
Friendly			Boxscore

Friendly	November 9	France	1–7	South Africa	Cape Town, South Africa
Friendly			Boxscore

Friendly	November 10	France	1–13	South Africa	Cape Town, South Africa
Friendly			Boxscore

Friendly	November 11	France	4–11	South Africa	Cape Town, South Africa
Friendly			Boxscore

== Medal count ==
Event	Editions	1st edition	Total				Notes
Event	Editions	1st edition	Gold medal	Silver medal	Bronze medal	Tot.	Notes
World Baseball Classic	0	—N/a	0	0	0	0	
World Cup	3	1994	0	0	0	0	
WBSC Premier12	0	—N/a	0	0	0	0	
Intercontinental Cup	3	1991	0	0	0	0	
Olympic Games	0	—N/a	0	0	0	0	
European Championship	27	1955	0	0	1	1	

== Results ==
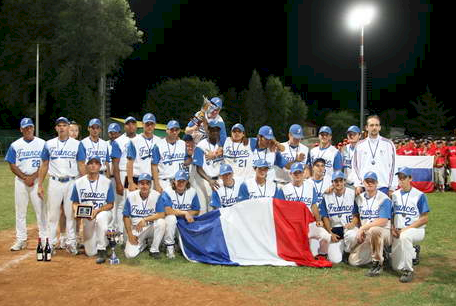
France U22 team, runner-up of the 2006 U22 European Championship

World Baseball Classic record							Qualification record			
Year	Round	Position	W	L	RS	RA	W	L	RS	RA
2006	did not enter						No qualifiers held			
2009	did not enter						No qualifiers held			
2013	did not qualify						0	2	2	13
2017	did not qualify						1	2	11	19
2023	did not qualify						0	2	5	21
2026	did not enter						did not enter			
Total	-	0/6	-	-	-	-	1	6	18	53

France World Baseball Classic Qualifiers Record by opponent
Opponent	Tournaments met	W-L record	Largest victory		Largest defeat		Current streak
Opponent	Tournaments met	W-L record	Score	Tournament	Score	Tournament	Current streak
Czech Republic	1	0-1	–		7–1	Germany 2023	L1
Great Britain	1	0-1	–		14–4 (F/8)	Germany 2023	L1
Panama	1	0-2	–		9–2	Panama 2017	L2
South Africa	1	0-1	–		5–2 (F/11)	United States 2013	L1
Spain	2	1-1	5–3	Panama 2017	8–3	United States 2013	W1
Overall	3	1–6	Against SPA		Against GBR		L3
Overall	3	1–6	5–3	Panama 2017	14–4 (F/8)	Germany 2023	L3

=== Baseball World Cup ===
- 1994 : 16th
- 2001 : 15th
- 2003 : 15th

=== Intercontinental Cup ===
- 1991 : 10th
- 1993 : 10th
- 1997 : 7th

=== European Baseball Championship ===
- 1954 : did not qualify
- 1955 : 5th
- 1956 : did not qualify
- 1957 : did not qualify
- 1958 : 6th
- 1960 : did not qualify
- 1962 : 6th
- 1964 : 5th
- 1965 : did not qualify
- 1967 : did not qualify
- 1969 : 7th
- 1971 : 9th
- 1973 : 6th
- 1975 : 6th
- 1977 : did not qualify
- 1979 : did not qualify
- 1981 : did not qualify
- 1983 : 6th
- 1985 : did not qualify
- 1987 : 4th
- 1989 : 5th
- 1991 : 4th
- 1993 : 4th
- 1995 : 5th
- 1997 : 5th
- 1999 : (bronze) 3rd
- 2001 : 4th
- 2003 : 7th
- 2005 : 6th
- 2007 : 5th
- 2010 : 6th
- 2012 : 8th
- 2014 : 6th
- 2016 : 7th
- 2019 : 7th
- 2021 : 15th
- 2023 : 7th
- 2025 : 12th

== French players in professional baseball ==
French players who have played minor league affiliated baseball:

- Rene Leveret: Minnesota Twins (RK/A) (2006-2009)
- Joris Bert: Los Angeles Dodgers (RK) (2007–2008)
- Fred Hanvi: Minnesota Twins (RK) (2008-2010)
- Alex Roy: Seattle Mariners (RK) (2012–2014)
- Andy Paz: Oakland Athletics (A/AA) (2011-2017)
- Jose Paula: Oakland Athletics (RK) (2016–2017)
- Yoan Antonac: Philadelphia Phillies (RK/A) (2018–2021)
- Ernesto Martínez Jr.: Milwaukee Brewers (A-AAA) & New York Yankees (AAA) (2017–present)
- Mathias LaCombe: Chicago White Sox (A/AA) (2023-present)
- Jordan Ouanyou: Cincinnati Reds (DSL) (2025-present)
