= Belgium national under-18 baseball team =

Belgium Baseball U-18

Information
- Country: Belgium
- Federation: Royal Belgian Baseball and Softball Federation
- Confederation: WBSC Europe

WBSC ranking
- Current: 28 (26 October 2026)

The Belgium national under-18 baseball team is the national under-18 team representing Belgium in international baseball competitions. The organization is currently ranked 24th in the world by the World Baseball Softball Confederation. They compete in the bi-annual European Junior Baseball Championship.

== See also ==
- Belgium national baseball team
- U-18 Baseball World Cup
