= Germany national under-18 baseball team =

Germany Baseball U-18

Information
- Country: Germany
- Federation: German Baseball and Softball Federation
- Confederation: WBSC Europe

WBSC ranking
- Current: 17 (26 October 2026)

The Germany national under-18 baseball team is the national under-18 team representing Germany in international baseball competitions. The organization is currently ranked 18th in the world by the World Baseball Softball Confederation. They compete in the bi-annual U-18 Baseball World Cup.

== See also ==
- Germany national baseball team
- U-18 Baseball World Cup
