= Netherlands national under-18 baseball team =

Information
- Country: Netherlands
- Federation: Royal Netherlands Baseball and Softball Federation
- Confederation: WBSC Europe

WBSC ranking
- Current: 11 (26 October 2026)

The Netherlands national under-18 baseball team is the national under-18 team representing the Netherlands in international baseball competitions. The organization, which includes the Dutch national team, is currently ranked 10th in the world by the World Baseball Softball Confederation. They compete in the bi-annual U-18 Baseball World Cup. The team has competed in the World Cup and its predecessor 21 times, with their best finish being fifth place in 2022.

== Results ==
=== Baseball World Junior Championship ===
- 1981: 8th
- 1989: 11th
- 1990: 10th
- 1991: 8th
- 1992: 10th
- 1993, 1994: 6th (tied)
- 1995, 1996: 7th
- 1997: 10th
- 1999: 11th
- 2002, 2004: 9th
- 2006: 8th
- 2008: 9th
- 2010: 6th

=== U-18 Baseball World Cup ===
- 2012: 11th
- 2017: 8th
- 2019: 7th
- 2022: 5th
- 2023: 6th

== See also ==
- Netherlands national baseball team
- Royal Netherlands Baseball and Softball Federation
- U-18 Baseball World Cup
