= France national under-18 baseball team =

France Baseball U-18

Information
- Country: France
- Federation: French Federation of Baseball and Softball
- Confederation: WBSC Europe

WBSC ranking
- Current: 26 (26 October 2026)

The France national under-18 baseball team is the national under-18 team representing France in international baseball competitions. The organization is currently ranked 22nd in the world by the World Baseball Softball Confederation. They compete in the bi-annual U-18 Baseball World Cup.

== See also ==
- France national baseball team
- U-18 Baseball World Cup
