= Czech Republic national under-18 baseball team =

Czech Republic Baseball U-18

Information
- Country: Czech Republic
- Confederation: WBSC Europe

WBSC ranking
- Current: 15 (31 December 2025)

The Czech Republic national under-18 baseball team is the national under-18 team representing the Czech Republic in international baseball competitions. The organization is currently ranked 14th in the world by the World Baseball Softball Confederation. They compete in the bi-annual U-18 Baseball World Cup.

== See also ==
- Czech Republic national baseball team
- U-18 Baseball World Cup
