= Italy national under-18 baseball team =

Italy Baseball U-18

Information
- Country: Italy
- Confederation: WBSC Europe

WBSC ranking
- Current: 13 ▲1 (26 October 2026)

The Italy national under-18 baseball team is the national under-18 team representing Italy in international baseball competitions. The organization is currently ranked 17th in the world by the World Baseball Softball Confederation. They compete in the bi-annual U-18 Baseball World Cup.

== See also ==
- Italy national baseball team
- U-18 Baseball World Cup
