= National sports team =

Team that represents a nation in a sport

A national sports team (commonly known as a national team or a national side) is a team that represents a nation, rather than a particular club or region, in an international sport.

The term is most commonly associated with team sports, for example association football (soccer), baseball, curling, ice hockey or basketball. However, it can be applied to groups of individuals representing a country where regular play is done by individuals, and individual scores are aggregated to a get a team result. Examples of this association are found in artistic gymnastics, archery, or figure Skating.

National teams often compete at various levels and age groups, and have a number of different selection criteria based on national and their respective federations' rules. For various reasons, National teams may not always composed of the best available individual players.

National teams, like other sporting teams, are often grouped by sex, age and/or other criteria. The most prestigious national teams are often the senior men's and women's teams. However, they may not be the most popular or successful.

In most cases, a national sports team represents a single sovereign state, though there are some exceptions to the rule. In several sports, the United Kingdom and wider British Isles divide along internal boundaries: England, Northern Ireland, Scotland and Wales are represented by separate national teams, while in Baseball and the Olympic Games they combine to form a Great Britain baseball and olympic teams. The Ireland national rugby union team represents the Republic of Ireland and Northern Ireland in rugby union, and all-island teams are fielded in a number of other sports. Some Olympic teams represent dependent territories, including Bermuda, the British Virgin Islands and the Cook Islands. In baseball, Dutch Antilles players play for both their home islands or for Kingdom of Netherlands, as their islands still are de jure still part of the Kingdom. The Iroquois Nationals (men) and Haudenosaunee Nationals (women) lacrosse teams of the First Nations Lacrosse Association are the only teams representing any group of Indigenous people of the Americas that plays in an international level.

== Popularity and notability ==
The popularity and notability of a national team depend on a number of factors:

=== Popularity and participation ===
Popularity of a national team also depends on the popularity of the sport in that country. In some countries a particular sport is very popular and may be a national sport but it does not always mean their national team is the most popular. Also, the national team's own league may be popular but the international competition it competes in is not. For example, the Papua New Guinea national rugby league team (PNGL) is extremely popular because the sport is popular in the country, even though the highest competition it competes in - the Rugby League World Cup - is not. In this case, there are numerous reasons for the lack of popularity of the World cup in Papua New Guinea. One is that the country is relatively small, population 8 million, and the expense of travel around the world to follow their team is too great for most. Another reason is that, because 75% of the professionals in the PNGL are not national citizens and therefore only eligible to play for their home country's national team, the Papua New Guinea National Team is not as successful internationally. Therefore, because the national league is inner territorial and more accessible to residents of Papua New Guinea and because spectators feel more invested and closer to their national town clubs, explains why a country's national sport's National Team may not be the most popular team in said area.

The exact opposite may be true as well where the national team is more popular than its respective league. For example, the Korean National Handball League is not extremely popular because handball is not a popular sport in Korea. But the South Korean National Team is popular because it internationally wins medals in the Olympics or World Cup Events.

==== Demographics ====
A particular sport in a country may be more popular among certain groups. For example, a women's team may be more popular than a men's team if there is a greater participation in the sport. Also, certain ethic groups may play the sport more than others, example is while asian-brazilians and venezuelan-brazilians historically make majority of the Baseball national teams, german-brazilians historically make majority of the fistball national teams.

=== Popularity of the competition ===
The popularity of the international competition that a team participates in has the biggest influence on the popularity of national sports team. There is a certain amount of prestige which is associated with competing on the "world stage".

Competitions with the most teams involved offer the most international competition and are often most popular. The most popular multi-sport international competitions that include team sports include the Olympic Games, Asian Games are relatively open for participation. Other competitions that are specific to sports, such as the FIFA World Cup (Association football), Rugby World Cup (rugby union) and Cricket World Cup (cricket) allow many countries to qualify. For instance, the popularity of the Socceroos is heightened during the FIFA World Cup simply due to participation in a global event.

However, how even the competition is also matters. Even if there are a large number of participants, if a handful of teams dominate or if many of the teams are from countries where the sport lack sufficient depth to field a quality side, then the overall competition will not be taken seriously.

=== Competitiveness or success of a team ===
The popularity of a national team can also be due to a team being successful even if the sport itself is not popular in a country, an example is the growing popularity of the Brazilian Baseball Team, due its recent results such as the silver medal at 2023 Pan-Am Games, and being able to qualify once again for the World Baseball Classic.

On the other hand, the streak of bad results and/or lack of titles may affect the popularity of a team, the Brazilian Football Association Team, has decreased in popularity, among other reasons, due to the drought of 24 years without a FIFA World Cup title.

=== Strength of domestic competition ===
In many countries, the national team is the highest level of play available and as a result, it is often most popular with fans and spectators from that country.

In other countries, domestic competitions may be more competitive and offer a higher standard of play and reward.

== Individual selection and participation ==
Depending on the sport, nation, and era in question, membership on the national team may be earned through individual play (as is the case for an Olympic athletics team or a Davis Cup team), players may be selected by a managers and coaches appointed by a national sport association, or a team may have to win a national championship in order to receive the right to represent their nation (as in the World Curling Championships).

=== Eligibility ===
Various rules are used to determine who is eligible to play for which national team.

==== Association football ====
Under FIFA regulations, a player primarily qualifies for a national team by "holding a permanent nationality that is not dependent on residence in a certain country"—i.e., being a passport-carrying citizen of said country.

If a player's single nationality enables him or her to play for more than one FIFA member, any of the following will be sufficient to establish eligibility for a specific association under that nationality:

1. Birth "on the territory governed by the relevant association."
2. The birth of a biological parent or grandparent in said territory.
3. Two years of continuous residence in said territory at the time of their first appearance.

However, FIFA allows associations that share a common nationality to make an agreement among themselves, subject to FIFA approval, by which the residency criterion is deleted completely or amended to require a longer time limit. The most notable example of this situation is the United Kingdom, which has four national associations on its territory (England, Northern Ireland, Scotland, Wales).

Players become permanently tied to a national association, with one exception to be outlined below, once they play in "an official competition of any category or any type of football". This includes any competition for national teams governed by FIFA, including qualifying matches for said competitions; international friendlies cannot tie players to a country under any circumstances.

Players who have more than one nationality, regardless of the method of acquisition, have slightly different eligibility requirements from those who have a single nationality, whether or not it is shared by multiple associations. In addition to holding the relevant nationality, any of the following will qualify a player to appear for said country:

1. Birth in that country.
2. Birth of a biological parent or grandparent in that country.
3. Five years of residence in that country after turning age 18.

This last rule is intended to prevent associations from naturalising players who lack birth or familial ties in that country, and immediately fielding them in international matches. FIFA will issue waivers to this last requirement if an association can show to FIFA's satisfaction that the player had significant ties to that country prior to naturalisation. A recent example of such a waiver is that of Gedion Zelalem, a German-born player of Ethiopian descent who has represented the U.S. at under-23 level. He emigrated with his father to the U.S. at age 9 in 2006, and left the country at age 16 to join Arsenal's youth academy. In 2014, he automatically became a U.S. citizen outside the normal naturalisation process when his father became a U.S. citizen, and the United States Soccer Federation applied for a waiver of the adult residency requirement, citing Zelalem's extended childhood residence in the U.S. He was approved to play for the U.S. several months later.

Separate from the above rules, a player who holds multiple nationalities may petition FIFA for a one-time change of nationality if they have never appeared in an official senior international match for any country, and holds the nationality of the second country prior to appearing for said country. The aforementioned Zelalem case falls within the scope of these rules, since he had played for Germany at youth level.

==== Basketball ====
FIBA's national team eligibility rules are broadly similar to those of FIFA. Holding nationality is mandatory (but not sufficient) for eligibility to represent a country. Players with multiple nationalities may choose to play for one of those countries at any age by making a written request to FIBA. However, if the player has yet to make a choice and one of those countries formally calls the player to international duty after they reach age 18, that player is required to make a choice at that time. As in association football, playing in an international friendly cannot tie a player to any country; only participation in an official FIBA competition is sufficient for this purpose.

Unlike association football, FIBA does not have a "grandparent rule" for most players. The method by which a player obtains citizenship is irrelevant to national team eligibility, as long as it has been legally acquired. The only use of the grandparent rule is to determine a player's eligibility to represent the national team of a country's dependent territory, with two notable examples being those of Puerto Rico and the US Virgin Islands, both US insular areas with their own national federations, and whose native-born residents are US citizens by birth.

While the method by which a player becomes a citizen does not affect their eligibility for a national team, it can affect the player's ability to participate in a given FIBA competition. FIBA mandates that in official competitions, no national team can have more than one player on its roster who acquired citizenship by any means after reaching age 16. This also applies to individuals who had the right to a second nationality at birth (such as individuals born in Northern Ireland, who are generally born with UK citizenship but also have the right to citizenship in the Republic of Ireland from birth), but did not exercise that right until age 16 or later.

==== Baseball ====
While eligibility rules may differ in some small details from WBSC rules, The eligibility rules of World Baseball Classic provide a very similar qualifying criteria, as follows:

1. Citizenship of the nation the player represents.
2. Holding a passport of the nation the player represents
3. Holding a permanent legal resident of the nation the player represents.
4. Being born in the nation the player represents.
5. One of the Parents being citizen in the nation the player represents.
6. One of the Parents being born in the nation the player represents

==== Cricket ====
The eligibility rules of the International Cricket Council provide three qualifying criteria for prospective national team players, (Note: In the context of cricket, "national team" includes teams such as the West Indies cricket team, which encompasses several countries and territories in the English-speaking Caribbean.) all linked to the country governed by a specific national federation:

1. Birth.
2. Nationality, defined as holding a valid passport.
3. Three years of permanent residence.

Players can only be tied to a given national team by being named to that country's squad, either in the first XI or as a substitute (playing or non-playing), in an official ICC match—defined as a Test, ODI, or Twenty20 match that involves a national federation's senior side. Playing at under-19 level, or for a senior developmental team, does not bind an individual to that country.

Unlike many sports, which make changes of nationality difficult or impossible, cricket allows players to represent more than one country during their careers. However, a player is limited to representing two countries in their lifetime, and a three-year stand-down period is enforced—unless the player who has previously represented an ICC associate member is seeking to play for an ICC full member (i.e., a Test-playing nation), in which case there is no stand-down period. The player may represent their original country after representing the second country, but only after the full three-year stand-down period.

==== Rugby union ====
Unlike the situation in association football and basketball, in which holding nationality in a country is a requirement for representing that country, or cricket, in which nationality is one of several means by which a player can qualify for a national team, eligibility regulations in rugby union do not mention nationality at all. Players can qualify for a given country in one of four ways:

1. Birth in the country.
2. Having a parent or grandparent born in that country. Note that unlike FIFA, which defines "parent" and "grandparent" to include only blood relations, World Rugby replaces blood relations with adoptive relations if the player has been legally adopted under the laws of the relevant country. This replacement also applies if the player was not adopted, but one or both of the birth parents had been adopted.
3. Residing in the country for a set period of time prior to their first appearance for that country. The required period was most recently expanded from three years to five years effective 31 December 2020. The five-year rule affects players who moved to a new country after 31 December 2017 and cannot qualify by another method.
4. Completion of 10 years of cumulative residency in the country, regardless of whether any of the other criteria have been met. This particular criterion went into effect in May 2017.

This does not prevent a national union from requiring that its representative players hold that country's nationality. For example, since December 2016, the French Rugby Federation has required French nationality as a precondition for national team selection, with players who had represented France before the policy change exempt from said requirement.

Through 2021, if a player has ever played for one national team then they may not play for the team of a different nation at same or at the next-higher level of seniority. However, the addition of rugby sevens to the Olympics created a loophole due to the IOC's different eligibility criteria. Players who had been "captured" by one country but held the passport of another country could make a one-time change of allegiance to the second country under the following conditions:

- The player had not represented the capturing country for three years at the time of their first appearance for the second country. Special rules in place only for the 2016 Olympic qualifying process shortened this period to 18 months.
- The player represented their new country in four Olympic qualifying events. This included events in the World Rugby Sevens Series for men and World Rugby Women's Sevens Series in seasons immediately preceding the Summer Olympics, which double as Olympic qualifiers, plus regional Olympic qualifying tournaments.

Effective 1 January 2022, a change to the World Rugby eligibility rules will allow a one-time change of nationality for captured players that applies to both 15s and sevens, replacing the former provisions regarding change of nationality for Olympic sevens. Features of the new rules are:

- A 36-month "stand-down" period from any international rugby is enforced.
- The player must have a birthright connection to the new country—either by the player's own birth, or that of a parent or grandparent. (The rule that replaces biological parents with adoptive parents remains in force.)
- Also, the change of nationality must be approved by World Rugby.

As for the concept of "capturing"—i.e., being tied to a specific country—the criteria have evolved over the years. Under current World Rugby regulations, a player is captured once they play for one of three specific teams:

1. A union's 15-a-side senior national team.
2. A union's "next senior" 15-a-side national team. Each union may, but is not required to, designate one of its teams as the "next senior" team. This side is usually designated as an "A" national team, though a number of nations have special brand names for their "next senior" side, such as Argentina XV, England Saxons, Ireland Wolfhounds, or Junior All Blacks (New Zealand). Notably, many unions have not designated a "next senior" women's team. Prior to 1 January 2018, a union could designate its under-20 national side as its "next senior" team, but this is no longer allowed.
3. A union's senior national sevens team. No player can be captured by playing on a senior sevens team before turning 18 under any circumstances; before 2022, capture in this manner prior to age 20 was impossible unless the player participated in the Olympics or Rugby World Cup Sevens after turning 18.

Starting in 2022, players will be captured if they are members of any of the country's aforementioned sides after turning 18.

Note that unlike association football or basketball, players can be captured by appearing in international friendlies, such as the traditional mid-year and end-of-year Tests.

However, capture only occurs when the opponent is also one of the above-mentioned sides. This can sometimes cause apparently counterintuitive results. For example, Mike Haley has represented England twice—first for England Saxons against South Africa A in 2016, and then for a non-capped England XV against the Barbarians in 2017. However, neither match tied him to England, and he has remained eligible for selection to Ireland, for which he qualified by ancestry. Even though the 2016 match involved two national "A" sides, it did not qualify to capture Haley (or any other player on either team who had not previously been captured) because at the time, South Africa's designated "next senior" side was its U-20 national team. As for the 2017 match, WR classifies the Barbarians as a club team, putting them outside the scope of this regulation.

Various controversies have involved the participation of players whose eligibility has been challenged. One famous example was Grannygate. More recently, questions have been raised about the eligibility of two players who participated in the European qualifying process for the 2019 Rugby World Cup, one for Belgium and the other for Romania.

=== Professionalism vs. amateurism ===
In some national teams, representatives play just for the love of their sport and country. However, in others, individual players are paid to represent their country.

In some cases, players are either deliberately excluded or choose not to represent their national team on the basis of not being remunerated. This can affect the relative performance of a team.

In other cases, players may be contracted to a club, at home or abroad. As a result, their primary loyalty may be to their club rather than their country, especially if the competition that the national team is playing in does not offer the same prestige.

=== Controversy ===
Communist countries were accused of having an advantage by having state-sponsored "full-time amateurs" because of their economic system. Their Olympic athletes were given everything they needed to live prosperously and train, but were not technically paid to do it because it was sponsored by the state. With the decline and fall of the Soviet Union and its influence, Western countries demanded to allow professionals to compete at the Olympics and the current status quo came into order.

== See also ==
- International cricket
- Test match (rugby union)
- Test match (rugby league)
- Test match (netball)
