= List of Major League Baseball umpires (A–F) =

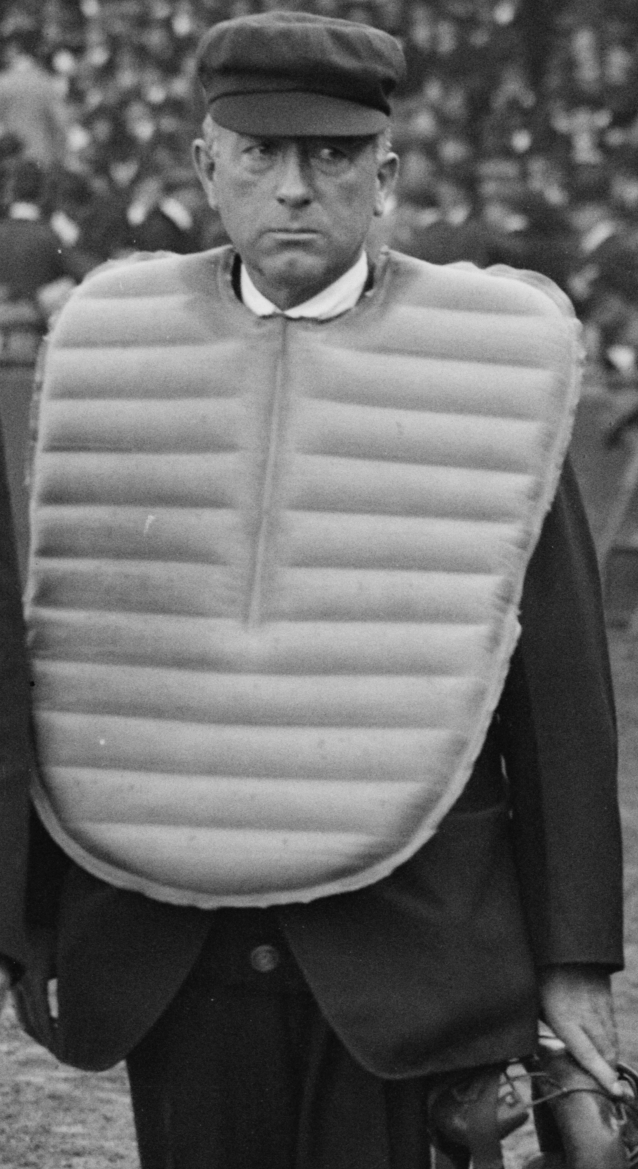
Umpire Tom Connolly, an inductee of the National Baseball Hall of Fame

The following is a list of baseball umpires with surnames beginning with the letters A through F who officiated in Major League Baseball (MLB). The list includes those who worked in any of four 19th-century major leagues (American Association, National Association, Players' League, Union Association), one defunct 20th century major league (Federal League), the currently active MLB, or either of its leagues (American League, National League) when they maintained separate umpiring staffs. All of the above leagues, with the exception of the National Association, are recognized by MLB’s Special Baseball Records Committee. The NA’s status as a major league is disputed, with some researchers such as those involved with Retrosheet including it in their major league statistics.

In the early days of organized baseball, umpires were unpaid volunteers. When the National Association formed in 1871, the home team would select a game’s umpire from a list provided by the away team. In 1878, the newly formed National League mandated that home teams pay their umpires, and provided them with a list to choose from. This is considered the first league organized umpiring staff, although the American Association became the first major league to pay their staff and assign them to games upon its founding in 1882.

Until the new American League popularized the two man system in 1902, all major leagues employed the use of the one man umpiring system. As the pace of baseball increased, umpires struggled to keep up, and it was not uncommon for players to be called in as substitute umpires in case of illness or injury. Adding a second umpire to games reduced this and the NL followed in 1912. The three man system became the standard in the 1930s, and the four man crew was instituted in 1952. The expansion of umpiring staffs in the American and National Leagues coincided with more stability, and less substitute umpires and call-ups from minor leagues.

In the 1960s, umpires in the National League began concentrated efforts to unionize, establishing a union in 1964. American League umpires joined in 1968, forming the Major League Umpires Association (MLUA). Prior to its dissolution, there were five instances of union action leading to MLB hiring substitute umpires in 1970, 1979, 1984, 1991 and 1995. The MLUA was replaced in 2000 by what is currently known as the Major League Baseball Umpires Association (MLBUA).

In 2020, MLB recognized seven leagues within Negro league baseball as major leagues: the first and second Negro National Leagues (1920–1931 and 1933–1948), the Eastern Colored League (1923–1928), the American Negro League (1929), the East–West League (1932), the Negro Southern League (1932), and the Negro American League (1937–1948). The Society for American Baseball Research considers the NAL’s 1949 and 1950 seasons to also be major league seasons, with Retrosheet including 1949 in their statistics. Records of the Negro major leagues are not as complete compared to other major leagues, and therefore information about the umpires who worked in those leagues is often unavailable.

Umpires who worked in the National Association are considered MLB umpires for the purposes of this list. Umpires who worked in the recognized Negro major leagues may also be added.

== Key ==
Name
^	Currently active
*	Hall of Fame inductee, for umpiring
§	Hall of Fame inductee, for playing career
†	Former major league player
‡	Substitute umpire (as an active player/manager/coach)

League
AA	American Association (1882–1891)
AL	American League (1901–1999)
ANL	American Negro League (1929)
ECL	Eastern Colored League (1923–1928)
EWL	East–West League (1932)
FL	Federal League (1914–1915)
MLB	Major League Baseball (2000–present)
NA	National Association (1871–1875)
NAL	Negro American League (1937–1948)
NL	National League (1876–1999)
NNL I	Negro National League (1920–1931)
NNL II	Negro National League (1933–1948)
NSL	Negro Southern League (1932)
PL	Players' League (1890)
UA	Union Association (1884)

Years
Years, or range of years, that the umpire was active.

Games
Number of regular season games umpired (through end of 2024). If the umpire has worked in multiple major leagues, the total is inclusive of all leagues.

== Umpires (A–F) ==
=== A ===
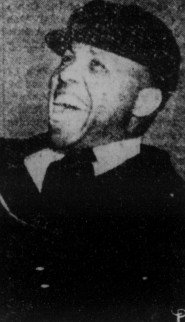
Emmett Ashford worked 810 AL games and was the first African-American major league umpire to work outside the Negro leagues

A
Name	League(s)	Years	Games	Ref(s)
Charlie Abbey‡	NL	1897	2	
Fred Abbott‡	NL	1905	2	
Clarence Adams	NL	1976	1	
Harry Adams	NL, AL	1897, 1903	16 (Note: 1 (NL, 1897), 15 (AL, 1903))	
Ryan Additon^	MLB	2017–present	851	
Bob Addy‡	NA	1875	1	
Adler	UA	1884	2	
Ham Allen†	NL	1876	1	
Andy Allison†‡	NA	1872, 1874	3	
Art Allison‡	NA	1871–1872, 1875	3	
Doug Allison‡	NA	1872–1873, 1875	4	
Dave Alston	NA	1871–1872, 1875	4	
Nick Altrock‡	AL	1907	1	
Andy Anderson	NL	1978–1979	19	
Dave Anderson‡	NL	1890	1	
Ollie Anderson	FL	1914	152	
Bill Andress	NL	1979	3	
Ed Andrews†‡	NL	1889, 1895, 1898–1899	206	
Bill Annan	NA	1873	1	
Merle Anthony	AL	1969–1975	965	
Mark Arata	AL	1991	1	
Ramon Armendariz	MLB	2004–2007	61	
Billy Arnold†	NA	1875	1	
Frank Arnold	AA	1889	1	
David Arrieta^	MLB	2020–present	127	
Tug Arundel‡	NL	1888	1	
Dave Aschwege	MLB	2003–2004	47	
Emmett Ashford	AL	1966–1970	810	
Ed Austin	AA	1890	1	
Nick Avants	AL	1970–1971	18	
Ham Avery	NA	1874–1875	9	
A.D. Ayers	NL	1876	1	

=== B ===
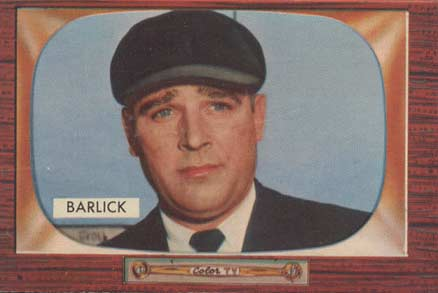
National Baseball Hall of Fame inductee Al Barlick worked 4231 games over 28 NL seasons

B
Name	League(s)	Years	Games	Ref(s)
Erich Bacchus^	MLB	2020–present	579	
John Bacon^	MLB	2019–present	426	
John Baird	NL	1979, 1981	14	
Bill Baker†	NL	1957	153	
Charles Baker	NL	1884	1	
Jordan Baker^	MLB	2012–present	1522	
Phil Baker†	NL	1889	5	
Jersey Bakley‡	AA, PL	1888, 1890	2 (Note: 1 (AA, 1888), 1 (PL, 1890))	
Kid Baldwin‡	AA	1887	1	
Mark Baldwin‡	AA	1892	1	
Lee Ballanfant	NL	1936–1957	3214	
Frank Ballina	NL	1991, 1995	7	
Brock Ballou^	MLB	2022–present	254	
Jimmy Bannon‡	NL	1894	1	
Sean Barber^	MLB	2014–present	1165	
Al Barker†	NL	1881	3	
Lance Barksdale^	MLB	2000–present	3095	
Al Barlick*	NL	1940–1971	4231	
Tom Barlow‡	NA	1875	2	
Ron Barnes	NL, MLB	1990–1997, 2001–2002	352 (Note: 295 (NL, 1990–97), 57 (MLB, 2001–02))	
Ross Barnes†‡	NA, PL	1874, 1890	58 (Note: 2 (NA, 1874), 56 (PL, 1890))	
Larry Barnett	AL	1969–1999	4281	
Billy Barnie†	AA, NL	1882, 1884, 1887, 1889, 1892	17 (Note: 5 (AA, 1882, 1884, 1887, 1889), 12 (NL, 1882, 1892))	
George Barnum	AA, NL	1890, 1896	48 (Note: 47 (AA, 1890), 1 (NL, 1896))	
George Barr	NL	1931–1949	2759	
Bill Barrett†‡	NA	1872, 1874	4	
Lance Barrett^	MLB	2010–present	1559	
Ted Barrett	AL, MLB	1994–2022	3400 (Note: 524 (AL, 1994–99), 2876 (MLB, 2000–22))	
Jim Barron	NA	1875	4	
Mark Barron	NL, MLB	1992–1997, 2001–2002	310 (Note: 188 (NL, 1992–97), 122 (MLB, 2001–02))	
Frank Barrows†	NA	1872	3	
Dan Barry	AL	1928	132	
Scott Barry^	MLB	2006–present	1897	
Mike Barston	NL	1979	1	
Steve Basil	AL	1936–1942	1037	
Toby Basner	MLB	2012–2017	349	
Jack Baswell	NL	1979	1	
Joe Battin†‡	NA, AA, NL	1874, 1882, 1886, 1891, 1895–1896	55 (Note: 1 (NA, 1874), 6 (AA, 1882, 1886), 48 (NL, 1891, 1895–96))	
Al Bauer†	AA	1887, 1890	32	
George Bausewine†	NL	1905	123	
Damien Beal	MLB	2007–2010	74	
Tommy Beals‡	NA	1872, 1874–1875	8	
Ed Bean	AL	1994	36	
Ollie Beard†	NL	1894	2	
John Beardsley	NA	1871–1873	14	
Ed Beatin‡	NL	1889	1	
Billy Becannon	AA	1883	12	
Buck Becannon‡	AA, NL	1884–1885	2 (Note: 1 (AA, 1884), 1 (NL, 1885))	
George Bechtel‡	NA	1874	2	
Adam Beck^	MLB	2020–present	605	
Bob Beck	NL	1979	6	
Erve Beck‡	NL	1902	1	
Jake Beckley^{§}‡	NL	1906	1	
Fred Beebe‡	NL	1907	1	
W. S. Beebe	NA	1872	1	
Frank Behle	NL	1895–1896, 1901	8	
Ollie Bejma‡	AL	1935	1	
Frank Bell†	AA	1889	2	
Wally Bell	NL, MLB	1992–2013	2760 (Note: 899 (NL, 1992–99), 1861 (MLB, 2000–13))	
Dan Bellino^	MLB	2008–present	1854	
Joe Bendekovits	NL	1979	1	
Chief Bender^{§}‡	AL	1907	1	
Jack Bennett	NL	1893	2	
Frederick Berger	NL	1886	1	
Tun Berger‡	NL	1891	1	
Bill Bernhard‡	AL	1903, 1907	4	
Charlie Berry†	AL	1942–1962	3080	
Henry Berthrong‡	NA	1872	1	
Ralph Betcher	NL	1976	1	
William Betts	NL, AL	1894–1896, 1898–1899, 1901, 1903	133 (Note: 121 (NL, 1894–96, 1898–99), 12 (AL, 1901, 1903))	
Monte Beville‡	AL	1903–1904	2	
Larry Bialorucki	AL	1995	7	
Jon Bible	AL	1984	0 (Note: Umpire did not work any regular season games, but did appear in postseason or all-star games.)	
Oscar Bielaski‡	NA	1874–1875	2	
Bits Bierhalter	AL	1918–1919, 1922, 1924	4	
W. J. Bigelow	NA, NL	1875, 1877	2 (Note: 1 (NA, 1875), 1 (NL, 1877))	
Dave Birdsall‡	NA	1873–1874	4	
Homer Bishop	AL	1979	1	
Red Bittmann†‡	AA, NL	1889, 1892, 1894–1895, 1897	9 (Note: 1 (AA, 1889), 8 (NL, 1892, 1894–95, 1897))	
William Blair	NA	1873	1	
Bob Blakiston‡	NL	1884	2	
Ryan Blakney^	MLB	2015–present	1235	
Fred Blandford	NL	1970	1	
Cliff Blankenship‡	AL	1907	1	
Cory Blaser^	MLB	2010–present	1682	
William Blodgett	NA, NL	1875–1876	15 (Note: 9 (NA, 1875), 6 (NL, 1876))	
Wes Blogg†	AA	1886	1	
Ed Bloom	AA	1887	1	
Ossie Bluege‡	AL	1938	1	
Virgil Blueitt	NAL	1937–1948 (Note: With few exceptions, game logs noting umpires for the Negro major leagues currently only date back to the 1937 season.)	(Note: Game totals for Negro league umpires do not currently exist.)	
John Boake	NA	1871	2	
Frederick Boardman†	NA	1875	7	
Dusty Boggess	NL	1944–1962	2590	
Matt Bohn	AL	1995	6	
Charles Boles	NL	1877	5	
Theo Bomeisler	NA	1871–1875	23	
Tommy Bond‡	NA, NL, AA	1875, 1883–1885, 1891	28 (Note: 1 (NA, 1875), 25 (NL, 1883, 1885), 2 (AA, 1884, 1891))	
Greg Bonin	NL, MLB	1984–2001	1746 (Note: 1660 (NL, 1984–99), 86 (MLB, 2000–01))	
Frank Bonner‡	NL	1894	1	
Amos Booth‡	AA	1882	1	
Steve Borga	AL	1979	3	
Nicholas Bouse	NA	1871	1	
Terry Bovey	NL	1979, 1984, 1995	22	
Bill Boyd‡	NA	1873, 1875	21	
Jim Boyer	AL	1944–1950	1026	
Henry Boyle‡	NL	1886	1	
Jack Boyle‡	AA, NL	1888, 1892, 1897	5 (Note: 1 (AA, 1888), 4 (NL, 1892, 1897))	
Foghorn Bradley†	NA, NL, AA	1875, 1879–1883, 1886	345 (Note: 1 (NA, 1875), 266 (NL, 1879–83), 78 (AA, 1886))	
George Bradley‡	UA	1884	1	
Brady	NL	1877	3	
Jackson Brady	NL	1887	7	
Asa Brainard†‡	NA	1872, 1875	2	
Kitty Bransfield†	NL	1917	156	
A. C. Bredberg	NL	1877–1879	12	
Ted Breitenstein‡	NL	1900	2	
Nick Bremigan	AL	1974–1988	2122	
Bill Brennan	NL, FL	1909–1915, 1921	1093 (Note: 772 (NL, 1909–13, 1921), 321 (FL, 1914–15))	
Jack Brennan‡ (catcher)	AA	1888	2	
Jack Brennan (umpire)	AA, NL	1884, 1887, 1899	79 (Note: 54 (AA, 1884), 25 (NL, 1887, 1899))	
Warren Briggs	NA	1874	1	
Joe Brinkman	AL, MLB	1972–2006	4505 (Note: 3782 (AL, 1972–99), 723 (MLB, 2000–06))	
Fatty Briody†	NL	1881	1	
Mike Briscese	AL	1979	10	
Fred Brocklander	NL	1979–1990	1514	
John Brockway	NL	1877, 1879	3	
Bud Brown	AL	1979	3	
Doug Brown	AL	1979	7	
J. Brown	AA	1887	1	
Jeff Brown	AL	1978–1979	10	
Sam Brown‡	NL	1907	1	
Tom Brown†	NL, AL	1898–1899, 1901–1902, 1907	318 (Note: 306 (NL, 1898–99, 1901–02), 12 (AL, 1907))	
William Brown	NA	1872	1	
David Bruce	NA	1875	1	
Randy Bruns	NL	1991	1	
William Buchanan	NL	1998	1	
William Buck	NA	1871	1	
Al Buckenberger	NL	1890	1	
Seth Buckminster	MLB	2014–2015	67	
C. B. Bucknor^	NL, MLB	1996–present	3384 (Note: 231 (NL, 1996–99), 3153 (MLB, 2000–present))	
Charlie Buelow‡	NL	1901	1	
Fritz Buelow‡	AL	1906	1	
Charlie Buffinton‡	NL	1883, 1888–1889, 1892	4	
Charles Bullymore	NL	1882	2	
Fred Bunce	NA	1874	1	
H. C. Bunce	NA	1872	1	
Josh Bunce‡	NL	1877	7	
Jack Burdock‡	NA, NL, AA	1872–1874, 1881, 1887	22 (Note: 20 (NA, 1872–74), 1 (NL, 1881), 1 (AA, 1887))	
Ken Burkhart†	NL	1957–1973	2700	
Frank Burlingame	NL, UA	1878, 1884	2 (Note: 1 (NL, 1878), 1 (UA, 1884))	
Watch Burnham	NL	1883, 1886–1887, 1889, 1895	107	
John Burns	NL	1884	71	
Oyster Burns†‡	AA, NL	1888, 1895, 1899	54 (Note: 1 (AA, 1888), 53 (NL, 1895, 1899))	
Tom Burns†	NL	1892	35	
Warren Burtis	NL	1876–1877	25	
Archie Bush	NA	1871	2	
Garnet Bush	NL, FL	1911–1912, 1914	145 (Note: 100 (NL, 1911–12), 45 (FL, 1914))	
Doc Bushong‡	NL, AA	1880–1881, 1888–1890	12 (Note: 6 (NL, 1880–81, 1890), 6 (AA, 1888–89))	
Dick Butler‡	NL	1897	5	
Nathan Butler	AA	1889	1	
Ormond Butler	AA	1883, 1886	15	
Jon Byrne	MLB	2014	9	
Walter Byrne	AA	1882	1	
Lord Byron	NL	1913–1919	1010	

=== C ===
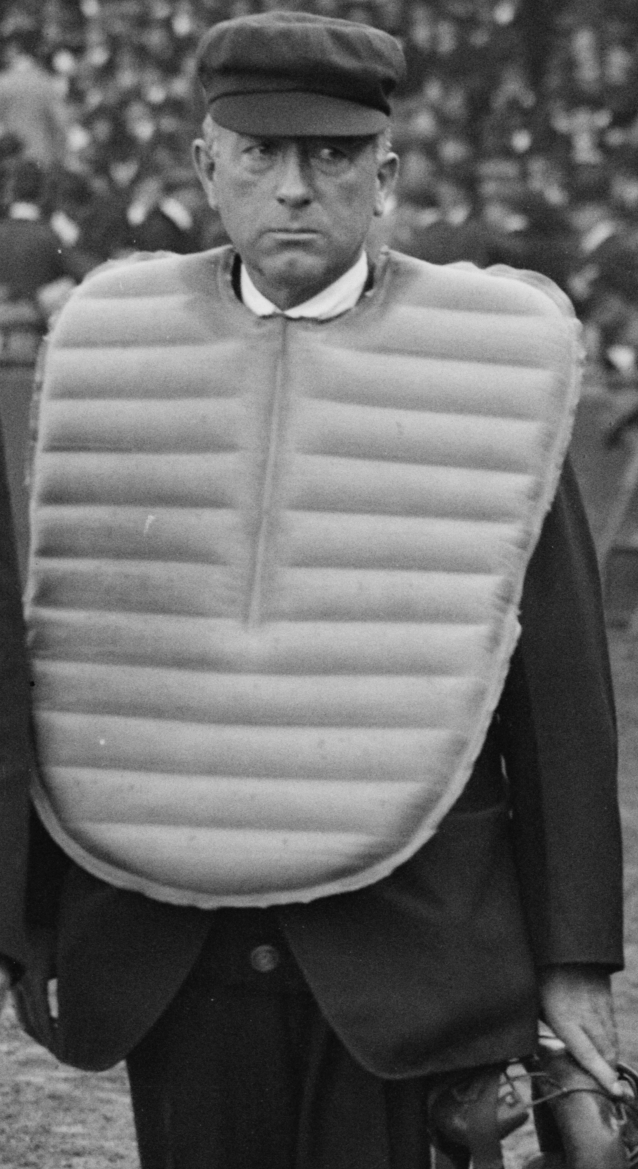
National Baseball Hall of Fame inductee Tom Connolly worked 4770 games between the AL and NL, including the first game in AL history

C
Name	League(s)	Years	Games	Ref(s)
Ed Callahan†‡	NL, UA	1881, 1884	30 (Note: 29 (NL, 1881), 1 (UA, 1884))	
Nixey Callahan‡	AL	1901	1	
Frank Campagna	NL	1979, 1984	18	
Bick Campbell	AL, NL	1928–1931, 1938–1940	936 (Note: 618 (AL, 1928–31), 318 (NL, 1938–40))	
Bob Campbell	AL	1979	4	
Dan Campbell	AA, NL	1890, 1894–1897	67 (Note: 1 (AA, 1890), 66 (NL, 1894–97))	
Angel Campos	MLB	2007–2014	585	
Joe Cantillon	AL, NL	1901–1902	207 (Note: 125 (AL, 1901), 82 (NL, 1902))	
Joe Caraco	AL	1995	7	
Vic Carapazza^	MLB	2010–present	1802	
Tom Carey†‡	NA, AA	1873–1875, 1882	38 (Note: 9 (NA, 1873–75), 29 (AA, 1882))	
Billy Carlin	AA	1885–1886, 1888–1889	49	
Mark Carlson^	NL, MLB	1999–2025	3017 (Note: 44 (NL, 1999), 2973 (MLB, 2000–2025))	
John Carney‡	PL	1890	1	
Red Carney	AL	1924	1	
Bill Carpenter	NL, AL	1897, 1904, 1906–1907	486 (Note: 431 (NL, 1897, 1904, 1906–07), 55 (AL, 1904))	
John Carpenter	NA	1874	1	
Bill Carrick‡	NL	1900	1	
Sam Carrigan	AL	1961–1964	627	
Fred Carroll‡	NL	1887	1	
Pat Carroll‡	UA	1884	3	
Kid Carsey‡	AA, NL	1891, 1894, 1896, 1901	5 (Note: 1 (AA, 1891), 4 (NL, 1894, 1896, 1901))	
Bob Caruthers†‡	NL, AL	1886, 1891, 1893, 1902–1903	204 (Note: 11 (NL, 1886, 1891, 1893), 193 (AL, 1902–03))	
Dan Casey‡	NL	1888	1	
Ed Caskin†‡	NL, PL	1884, 1890	2 (Note: 1 (NL, 1884), 1 (PL, 1890))	
John Cassidy‡	NA, NL, AA	1875, 1882, 1884	3 (Note: 1 (NA, 1875), 1 (NL, 1882), 1 (AA, 1884))	
Kevin Causey	MLB	2006–2009	81	
Harry Cavanaugh	NA	1875	1	
Dick Cavenaugh	NL	1979, 1984	16	
Gary Cederstrom	AL, MLB	1989–2019	3579 (Note: 1067 (AL, 1989–99), 2512 (MLB, 2000–19))	
Nestor Ceja^	MLB	2020–present	596	
Ice Box Chamberlain‡	AA, NL	1887, 1891, 1894	3 (Note: 2 (AA, 1887, 1891), 1 (NL, 1894))	
Frank Chance^{§}‡	NL	1902	1	
Moses Chandler	NA, NL	1872–1874, 1877	6 (Note: 3 (NA, 1872–74), 3 (NL, 1877))	
Jack Chapman†‡	NA, NL	1871, 1873–1874, 1876, 1880, 1882	30 (Note: 7 (NA, 1873–74, 1876), 23 (NL, 1876, 1880, 1882))	
John Cheppu	NL	1876	1	
Ollie Chill	AL	1914–1916, 1919–1922	1028	
Harry Chipman	NL	1883, 1885–1886	9	
Randy Christal	AL	1984	0	
Nestor Chylak*	AL	1954–1978	3857	
Bobby Clack‡	NL	1876	5	
John Clapp‡	NA	1874–1875	14	
Al Clark	AL, MLB	1976–2001	3392 (Note: 3213 (AL, 1976–99), 179 (MLB, 2000–01))	
Bob Clark†	NL	1897	1	
Artie Clarke‡	NL	1890	1	
Bob Clarke	NL	1930–1931	244	
Boileryard Clarke‡	NL	1893–1894, 1896	4	
Dad Clarkson‡	NL	1893–1896	7	
John Clarkson‡	NL	1888, 1890, 1892–1893	4	
Dick Clegg	AL	1979	20	
Curly Clement	AL	1978–1979	2	
Paul Clemons^	MLB	2020–present	370	
Jim Clinton‡	NA, AA	1873, 1875, 1886	19 (Note: 7 (NA, 1873, 1875), 12 (AA, 1886))	
Drew Coble	AL	1982–1999	2303	
George Cockill	NL	1915	61	
Al Cohen	NL	1976	2	
Colby	NA	1873	1	
John Coleman‡	NL	1884	1	
Harry Colgan	NL	1899, 1901	13	
Harry Colliflower†	AL	1910	46	
Dan Collins†‡	NA, NL	1875–1876	2 (Note: 1 (NA, 1875), 1 (NL, 1876))	
Delfin Colon	MLB	2008–2009	46	
Nick Colosi	NL	1968–1982	2063	
Charlie Comiskey^{§}‡	PL	1890	1	
Craig Compton	AL	1995	5	
Ed Conahan	NL	1896	10	
Fred Cone†	NA, NL	1873–1877	23 (Note: 12 (NA, 1873–75), 11 (NL, 1876–77))	
Jocko Conlan*†	AL, NL	1935, 1941–1965	3623 (Note: 2 (AL, 1935), 3621 (NL, 1941–65))	
Jack Conn	NL	1979	1	
Connell	AA	1891	1	
Terry Connell†	AA, NL	1884–1887, 1889–1890	76 (Note: 64 (AA, 1884–86, 1889–90), 12 (NL, 1885, 1887))	
Red Connolly	AA, NL	1884–1887, 1892–1893	193 (Note: 132 (AA, 1884–85, 1887), 61 (NL, 1885–87, 1892–93))	
Tom Connolly*	NL, AL	1898–1931	4770 (Note: 317 (NL, 1898–1900), 4453 (AL, 1901–31))	
Tom Connor	AL	1905–1906	163	
Pat Connors	NL	1998	42	
Chris Conroy^	MLB	2010–present	1546	
Alan Contant	AL	1978–1979	14	
John Conway	NL	1906	155	
Dan Coogan‡	NL	1895	1	
R. F. Cook	NL	1879	1	
Rob Cook	NL, MLB	1999–2000	31 (Note: 10 (NL, 1999), 21 (MLB, 2000))	
Johnny Cooney‡	NL	1941	1	
Terry Cooney	AL	1974–1992	2233	
Eric Cooper	AL, MLB	1996–2019	2804 (Note: 254 (AL, 1996–99), 2204 (MLB, 2000–19))	
Elias Cope	NA	1871	1	
Tommy Corcoran†	FL	1915	46	
Doug Cossey	AL	1978–1979, 1984	11	
Perry Costello	NL	1995	2	
Emilien Cote	NL	1979	7	
Bill Coughlin‡	AL	1904	5	
Derryl Cousins	AL, MLB	1979–2012	4496 (Note: 2855 (AL, 1979–99), 1641 (MLB, 2000–12))	
Terry Craft	AL, MLB	1987–2006	1734 (Note: 1140 (AL, 1987–99), 594 (MLB, 2000–06))	
Robert Crandall	NL, AA	1876–1878, 1882	17 (Note: 14 (NL, 1876–78), 3 (AA, 1882))	
Ed Crane‡	NL	1892–1893	5	
Sam Crane‡	NL	1879, 1886–1887, 1890	8	
Bill Craver‡	NA	1873	2	
Alexander Crawford	UA, NL	1884, 1886	26 (Note: 25 (UA, 1884), 1 (NL, 1886))	
Jerry Crawford	NL, MLB	1976–2010	4371 (Note: 3178 (NL, 1976–99), 1193 (MLB, 2000–10))	
Shag Crawford	NL	1956–1975	3120	
P. C. Cray	NL	1893	1	
Ed Creighton	AA	1889–1890	3	
Morrie Critchley†	AA	1884–1885	5	
Fred Crolius‡	NL	1901	1	
Charles Cromwell	ECL, NNL II	1923–1927, 1937—1947		
Jack Cronin	AL, NL	1901–1902	4 (Note: 2 (AL, 1901), 2 (NL, 1902))	
John Cross	NL	1876, 1878	10	
Lave Cross	AA, NL	1889, 1892	2 (Note: 1 (AA, 1889), 1 (NL, 1892))	
Monte Cross†	FL	1914	141	
Billy Crowell‡	AA	1888	1	
Jim Cudworth†	NL	1880	1	
Fieldin Culbreth	AL, MLB	1993–2021	3140 (Note: 531 (AL, 1993–99), 2609 (MLB, 2000–18, 2021))	
Dick Culler‡	NL	1947	1	
Jim Cuneo	NL, AL	1978–1979	32 (Note: 21 (NL, 1978–79), 11 (AL, 1979))	
Bert Cunningham†‡	NL	1896–1897, 1900–1901	50	
George Cuppy‡	NL	1894	2	
John Curran‡	NL	1876	1	
Frank Curry	AA	1886	2	
Wes Curry†‡	AA, NL	1884–1887, 1889–1890, 1898	383 (Note: 121 (AA, 1884, 1887, 1890), 262 (NL, 1885–86, 1889, 1898))	
Steve Cusack	NL, FL	1909, 1914	192 (Note: 51 (NL, 1909), 141 (FL, 1914))	
Charlie Cushman	NL	1885, 1894, 1898	110	
Andy Cusick‡	NL	1886–1887	4	
Ned Cuthbert†‡	NA, UA, AA	1875, 1884, 1887–1888	42 (Note: 3 (NA, 1875), 1 (UA, 1884), 38 (AA, 1887–88))	
Phil Cuzzi^	NL, MLB	1991–1993, 1999–present	3243 (Note: 120 (NL, 1991–93, 1999), 3123 (MLB, 2000–present))	

=== D ===
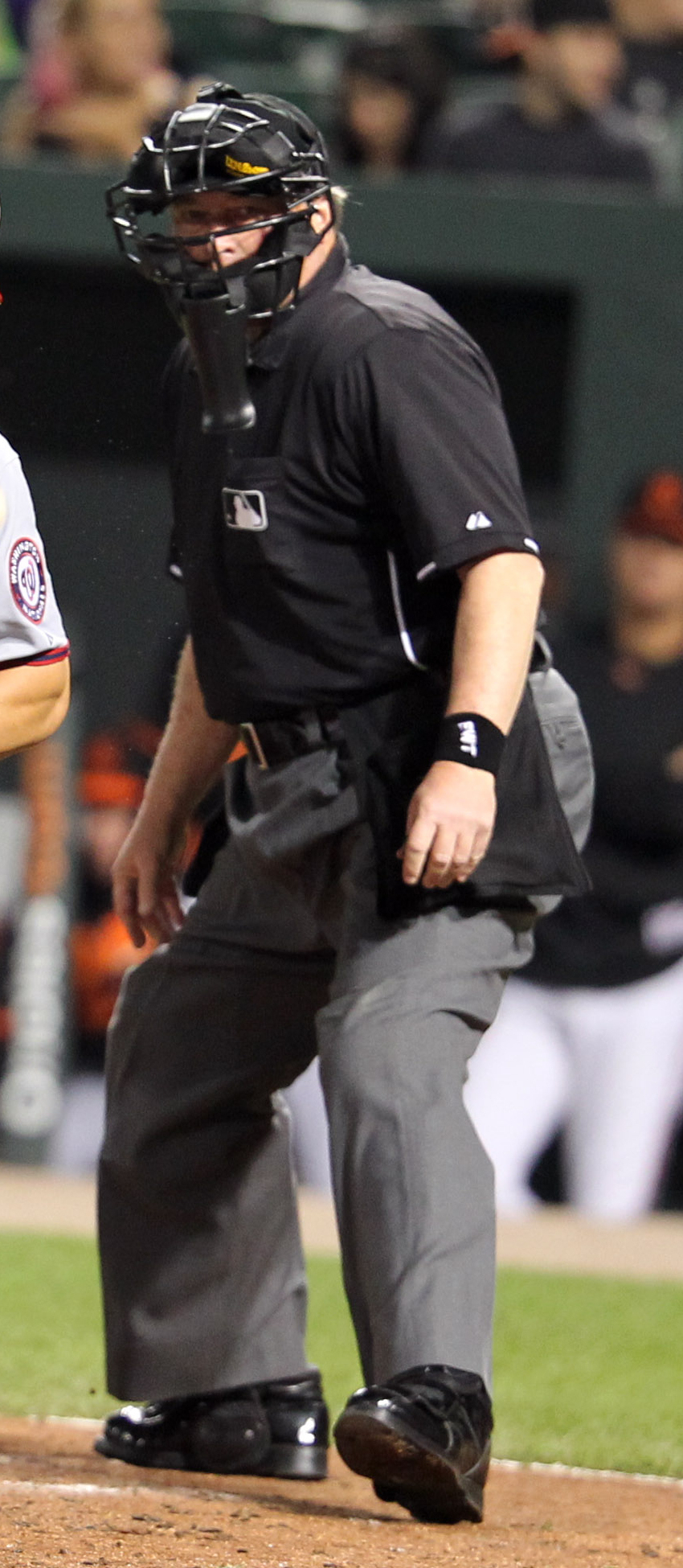
Gerry Davis worked 4849 games between the NL and the unified MLB, and holds the record for most postseason appearances as of 2025

D
Name	League(s)	Years	Games	Ref(s)
John Dailey†	NL, AA	1882, 1884, 1889	37 (Note: 12 (NL, 1882), 25 (AA, 1884, 1889))	
Con Daily‡	PL, NL	1890–1891, 1894, 1896	4 (Note: 1 (PL, 1890), 3 (NL, 1891, 1894, 1896))	
Jerry Dale	NL	1970–1985	1987	
Tom Daly‡	NL	1901	2	
Charles F. Daniels	NA, NL, AA	1874–1876, 1878–1880, 1883–1885, 1887–1889	512 (Note: 28 (NA, 1874–75), 278 (NL, 1876, 1878–80, 1885, 1887–88), 206 (AA, 1883–85, 1889))	
Law Daniels‡	AA	1887	2	
Kerwin Danley	NL, MLB	1992–2021	2656 (Note: 398 (NL, 1992–99), 2258 (MLB, 2000–19, 2021))	
Dell Darling‡	NL, AA	1887, 1891	4 (Note: 2 (NL, 1887), 2 (AA, 1891))	
Gary Darling	NL, MLB	1986–1999, 2002–2013	3270 (Note: 1674 (NL, 1986–99), 1596 (MLB, 2002–13))	
Frank Dascoli	NL	1948–1961	2057	
Thomas Daubney	NA	1871	1	
L. N. David	NA	1874	1	
Bob Davidson	NL, MLB	1982–1999, 2005–2016	3908 (Note: 2339 (NL, 1982–99), 1572 (MLB, 2005–16))	
Dale Davidson	AL	1979	6	
Satch Davidson	NL	1969–1984	2262	
Bill Davis	NL	1995	7	
Bob Davis	NL	1979	3	
Gerry Davis	NL, MLB	1982–2021	4849 (Note: 2227 (NL, 1982–99), 2622 (MLB, 2000–21))	
Harry Davis‡	AL	1903	1	
Jumbo Davis†	AA	1891	68	
Mort Dawson		1871	1	
Pat Dealy‡	NL	1886	2	
Harry Deane†‡	NA, NL	1871, 1874, 1876, 1878	7 (Note: 3 (NA, 1871, 1874), 4 (NL, 1876, 1878))	
Stewart Decker	NL	1883–1885, 1888	287	
Bill Deegan	AL	1971–1980, 1984, 1991, 1995	1428	
Pete DeFlesco	AL	1991	1	
Herman Dehlman†	NA	1873–1875	14	
Ramon De Jesus^	MLB	2016–present	993	
Dusty Dellinger	MLB	2005–2007	30	
Vic Delmore	NL	1956–1959	618	
D. P. Demorest	NA	1872–1873	3	
Dana DeMuth	NL, MLB	1983–2019	4283 (Note: 2171 (NL, 1983–99), 1927 (MLB, 2000–18, 2019))	
Shan Deniston	NL	1978	1	
Don Denkinger	AL	1969–1998	3824	
Richard Denny	AL	1984	0	
Doll Derr	NL	1923	28	
Jim Devine	AA	1890	2	
Dan Devinney	NL, AA, UA	1876–1877, 1884, 1887	111 (Note: 26 (NL, 1876–77), 28 (AA, 1884, 1887), 57 (UA, 1884))	
Charlie Devlin	AA	1888	2	
Charlie Dexter‡	NL	1896–1897	3	
Frank Dezelan	NL	1966–1970	370	
Laz Díaz^	AL, MLB	1995, 1997–present	3338 (Note: 135 (AL, 1995, 1997–99), 3203 (MLB, 2000–present))	
Roger Dierking	NL	1978	1	
Lou DiMuro	AL	1963–1982	2659	
Mike DiMuro	AL, MLB	1997, 1999–2018	1877 (Note: 87 (AL, 1997, 1999), 1790 (MLB, 2000–18))	
Ray DiMuro	AL	1996–1998	99	
Bill Dinneen†‡	AL	1907, 1909–1937	4217	
Hal Dixon	NL	1953–1959	989	
Henry Dobson	NA	1871	1	
Tom Dolan†	AA	1890–1891	6	
W. C. Dole	NA	1875	6	
Jim Donahue‡	AA	1888	2	
Red Donahue‡	NL, AL	1897, 1903, 1906	6 (Note: 3 (NL, 1897), 3 (AL, 1903, 1906))	
Tim Donahue‡	NL	1895–1896	2	
Augie Donatelli	NL	1950–1973	3776	
Mike Donlin†‡	NL, AL	1900, 1918	2 (Note: 1 (NL, 1900), 1 (AL, 1918))	
Joe Donnegan	NL	1881–1882	42	
Charles Donnelly	NL, AL	1931–1932, 1934–1935	566 (Note: 272 (NL, 1931–32), 294 (AL, 1934–35))	
Jim Donnelly‡	NL	1896	3	
Michael Donohue	NL	1930	90	
Bill Donovan‡	NL, AL	1902–1903, 1906	3 (Note: 1 (NL, 1902), 2 (AL, 1903, 1906))	
Timothy Donovan	UA	1884	2	
Red Dooin‡	NL	1904	1	
T. E. Dornlach	NA	1872	1	
Herm Doscher†‡	NL, AA	1879–1881, 1887–1888, 1890	463 (Note: 233 (NL, 1879–81, 1887), 230 (AA, 1887–88, 1890))	
Klondike Douglass‡	NL	1903	1	
Clarence Dow†	AA	1891	1	
Adam Dowdy	MLB	2002–2007	326	
Tom Dowse‡	NL	1890	3	
Jack Doyle†	NL	1911	42	
Rob Drake^	NL, MLB	1999–present	2872 (Note: 3 (NL, 1999), 2869 (MLB, 2000–present))	
Doc Draper	NA, NL	1871, 1877	3 (Note: 2 (NA, 1871), 1 (NL, 1877))	
Bruce Dreckman^	NL, MLB	1996–1999, 2002–present	2655 (Note: 357 (NL, 1996–99) 2298 (MLB, 2002–11, 2013, 2015, 2017–19, 2021–present))	
Roy Dreke	AL	1979	5	
Al Dresser	AL	1995	1	
Lew Drill‡	AL	1903–1904	7	
Joe Driscoll	AL	1978	1	
Cal Drummond	AL	1960–1969	1357	
Ed Ducharme	NL	1876–1877	30	
Jim Duffy	AL	1951–1953	449	
Ed Dugan†	AA	1887	1	
Bill Duggleby‡		1905	1	
Martin Duke†	AA	1890	1	
Dennis Duncan	AL, NL	1995, 1998	7 (Note: 6 (AL, 1995), 1 (NL, 1998))	
Fred Dunlap†	NL	1879	1	
Hugh Dunlevy	AA	1887	3	
Tom Dunn	NL	1939–1946	1142	
Jim Dunne	AL	1978–1979	4	
Peter Durfee	MLB	2005	4	
Patrick Dutton	UA	1884	39	
Frank Dwyer†‡	NL, AL	1889, 1893–1894, 1896–1897, 1899, 1901, 1904	345 (Note: 193 (NL, 1889, 1893–94, 1896–97, 1899, 1901), 152 (AL, 1904))	
John Dyler†	AA, NL	1883–1885, 1892, 1897	44 (Note: 42 (AA, 1883–85), 2 (NL, 1892, 1897))	

=== E ===
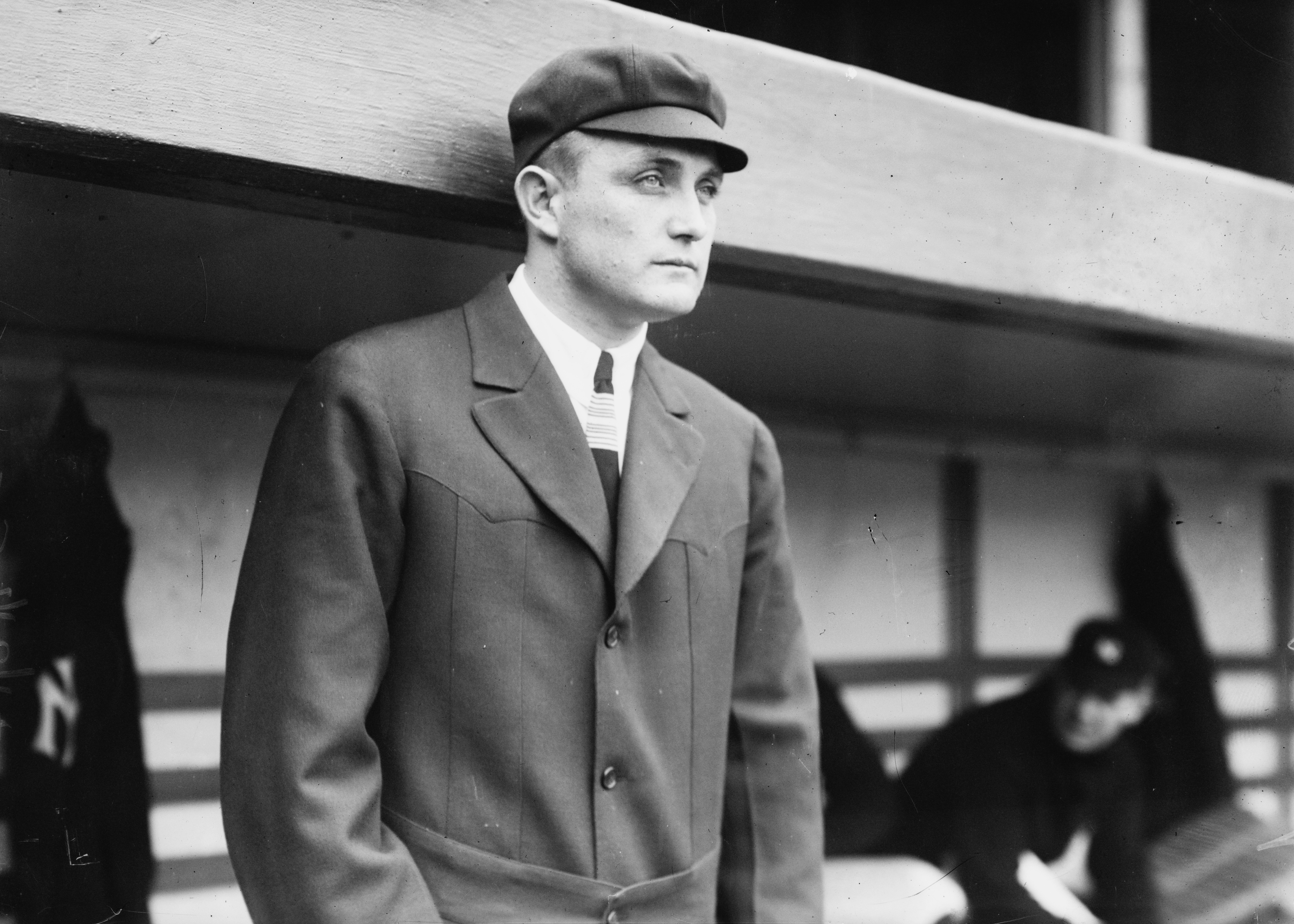
National Baseball Hall of Fame inductee Billy Evans worked 3319 games in the AL and was the youngest umpire in major league history

E
Name	League(s)	Years	Games	Ref(s)
John Eagan	NL	1878–1879, 1886	45	
Billy Earle‡	NL	1892, 1894	2	
Harold Easley	AL	1979	11	
Mal Eason†‡	NL	1902, 1910–1917	992	
Jack Easton‡	AA	1891	1	
Doug Eddings^	AL, MLB	1998–present	3316 (Note: 87 (AL, 1998–99), 3229 (MLB, 2000–present))	
Larry Edwards	NL	1978	1	
Rip Egan†	AL	1903, 1907–1914	1048	
Red Ehret‡	AA, NL	1890, 1892, 1895–1897	7 (Note: 1 (AA, 1890), 6 (NL, 1892, 1895–97))	
Clarence Eldridge	AL	1914–1915	6	
Joe Ellick†	NL, AA	1886, 1888–1889	20 (Note: 17 (NL, 1886), 3 (AA, 1888–89))	
William Ellis	NA	1871–1872, 1875	4	
Paul Emmel	AL, MLB	1999–2023	2514 (Note: 30 (AL, 1999), 2484 (MLB, 2000–17, 2019, 2022–23))	
Bob Emslie†	AA, NL	1890–1924	4229 (Note: 137 (AA, 1890), 4092 (NL, 1891–1924))	
Bob Engel	NL	1965–1990	3630	
Bill Engeln	NL	1952–1956	751	
John English	NA, NL	1874–1876	10 (Note: 9 (NA, 1874–75), 1 (NL, 1876))	
Fred Erby	NA	1872	5	
George Eshelman	AL	1979	19	
Mike Estabrook^	MLB	2006–present	1973	
Billy Evans*	AL	1906–1927	3320	
George Evans	NA	1872	1	
Jake Evans‡	NL	1886	1	
Jeff Evans	AL	1991	1	
Jim Evans	AL	1971–1999	3896	
Mike Everitt	AL, MLB	1996–2019	2633 (Note: 199 (AL, 1996–99), 2434 (MLB, 2000–19))	
Buck Ewing^{§}‡	AA	1882	2	
John Ewing‡	AA	1889	1	

=== F ===
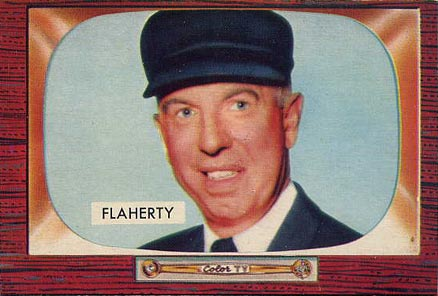
Red Flaherty worked 3208 AL games over 21 years

F
Name	League(s)	Years	Games	Ref(s)
Clint Fagan	MLB	2011–2017	522	
Chad Fairchild^	MLB	2004–present	2345	
Anton Falch‡	UA	1884	1	
Mike Farmer	AL	1979	3	
Harry Farnsworth	AL	1979	14	
Duke Farrell‡	NL	1901–1902	3	
Dick Feaser	AL	1979	5	
Fell	AA	1885	1	
T. E. Fellows	NA	1871	1	
Norman Fenno	NL	1876	1	
Bob Ferguson†‡	NA, NL, AA, PL	1871–1875, 1879, 1884–1891	829 (Note: 43 (NA, 1871–75), 147 (NL, 1879, 1884–85), 503 (AA, 1886–89, 1891), 136 (PL, 1890))	
Charlie Ferguson‡ (1880s pitcher)	NL	1886	1	
Charlie Ferguson† (1900s pitcher)	AL	1913–1914	122	
Wallace Fessenden	NL	1889–1890	53	
Mike Fichter	AL, MLB	1999–2005	557 (Note: 3 (AL, 1999) 554 (MLB, 2000–05))	
Jerry Fick	NL	1978–1979	5	
Steve Fields	NL	1979–1981	373	
Bill Finneran	NL, FL	1911–1912, 1915, 1923	582 (Note: 437 (NL, 1911–12, 1923), 145 (FL, 1915))	
Cherokee Fisher‡	NA, NL	1871, 1875–1876	4 (Note: 3 (NA, 1871, 1875), 1 (NL, 1876))	
Frank Fisher	NL	1979, 1984	18	
Mike Fitzpatrick	AL	1979	31	
Freddie Fitzsimmons‡	NL	1941	1	
Martin Flaherty†	NL	1882	1	
Patsy Flaherty‡	AL, NL	1903–1904, 1907	5 (Note: 2 (AL, 1903), 3 (NL, 1904, 1907))	
Red Flaherty	AL	1953–1973	3207	
Tom Fleming	NL	1979	1	
Andy Fletcher^	NL, MLB	1999–present	3019 (Note: 35 (NL, 1999), 2984 (MLB, 2000–present))	
John Floras	NL	1991, 1995	7	
Jocko Flynn†	NL	1893	1	
Tom Foley†	NA	1874–1875	4	
Bill Follmer	AL	1979	5	
Davy Force‡	NA, NL	1873, 1881	2 (Note: 1 (NA, 1873), 1 (NL, 1881))	
Dale Ford	AL	1976–1999	3137	
Wade Ford	NL	1995	6	
Brownie Foreman‡	NL	1896	2	
Frank Foreman‡	NL, AL	1895, 1901	2 (Note: 1 (NL, 1895), 1 (AL, 1901))	
Al Forman	NL	1961–1965	781	
Marty Foster	AL, MLB	1996–2022	2745 (Note: 219 (AL, 1996–99), 2526 (MLB, 2000–22))	
Pop Foster‡	NL	1900	2	
Edward Fountain	NL	1879	9	
Henry Fountain	AA	1888	1	
Bill Fouser‡	NL	1876	2	
Gene Fowler	AL	1979	1	
Wheeler Fowler	NL	1978	2	
Art Frantz	AL	1969–1977	1386	
Ralph Frary	NL	1911	17	
Bob Freels	NL	1979	8	
Buck Freeman‡	NL	1900	1	
Todd Freese	AL	1995	6	
Bill Friel†	AL	1920	56	
Bruce Froemming	NL, MLB	1971–2009	5163 (Note: 4107 (NL, 1971–99), 1056 (MLB, 2000–09))	
Grover Froese	AL	1952–1953	258	
Lester Fuchs	AL	1978–1979	3	
Joseph Fugere	NL	1998	1	
Troy Fullwood	MLB	2004–2007	72	
Chick Fulmer†‡	NA, NL, AA	1872–1875, 1881, 1886, 1888	78 (Note: 12 (NA, 1872–75), 65 (NL, 1881, 1886), 1 (AA, 1888))	
Chris Fulmer‡	AA	1887	2	
Tyler Funneman	MLB	2011	1	
Bill Furlong	NL, UA	1877–1880, 1883–1884, 1888	146 (Note: 144 (NL, 1877–80, 1883–84, 1888), 2 (UA, 1884))	
Lee Fyfe	FL, NL, ECL or NNL I	1915, 1920, 1926	89 (Note: 84 (FL, 1915), 5 (NL, 1920))	

== See also ==
- List of Major League Baseball umpires (G–M)
- List of Major League Baseball umpires (N–Z)
- List of Major League Baseball umpiring leaders
