= 2013 World Baseball Classic – Qualifier 3 =

Qualifier 3 of the Qualifying Round of the 2013 World Baseball Classic was held at Rod Carew Stadium, Panama City, Panama from November 15 to 19, 2012.

Qualifier 3 was a modified double-elimination tournament. The winners for the first games matched up in the second game, while the losers faced each other in an elimination game. The winners of the elimination game then played the losers of the non-elimination game in another elimination game. The remaining two teams then played each other to determine the winners of the Qualifier 3.

== Bracket ==
Preliminaries
– | Brazil | 3
– | Panama | 2
– | Nicaragua | 1
– | Colombia | 8
Lower round 1
L1 | Panama | 6
L2 | Nicaragua | 2

Semifinals
W1 | Brazil | 7
W2 | Colombia | 1
Lower final
W4 | Panama | 9
L3 | Colombia | 7

Qualifier
W3 | Brazil | 1
W5 | Panama | 0

== Results ==
- All times are Eastern Standard Time (UTC−05:00).

=== Brazil 3, Panama 2 ===
November 15 20:00 at Rod Carew Stadium
| Team | 1 | 2 | 3 | 4 | 5 | 6 | 7 | 8 | 9 | R | H | E |
|---|---|---|---|---|---|---|---|---|---|---|---|---|
| Brazil | 0 | 0 | 2 | 0 | 1 | 0 | 0 | 0 | 0 | 3 | 10 | 2 |
| Panama | 0 | 1 | 1 | 0 | 0 | 0 | 0 | 0 | 0 | 2 | 6 | 1 |
WP: Noris Chacon (1−0) LP: Ernesto Silva (0−1) Sv: Thyago Vieira (1); Attendance: 13,728 (50.8%); Umpires: HP − Toby Basner, 1B − Domingo Polanco, 2B − Angel Campos, 3B − Jair Fernandez; Boxscore

=== Colombia 8, Nicaragua 1 ===
November 16 20:00 at Rod Carew Stadium
| Team | 1 | 2 | 3 | 4 | 5 | 6 | 7 | 8 | 9 | R | H | E |
|---|---|---|---|---|---|---|---|---|---|---|---|---|
| Nicaragua | 0 | 0 | 0 | 1 | 0 | 0 | 0 | 0 | 0 | 1 | 8 | 1 |
| Colombia | 0 | 5 | 0 | 1 | 0 | 0 | 0 | 2 | X | 8 | 9 | 0 |
WP: Sugar Ray Marimón (1–0) LP: Erasmo Ramírez (0–1); Home runs: NCA: Cheslor Cuthbert (1); COL: Giovanny Urshela (1), Steve Brown (1); Attendance: 4,028 (14.9%); Umpires: HP − Clint Fagan, 1B − Cesar Valdes, 2B − Toby Basner, 3B − Domingo Polanco; Boxscore

=== Brazil 7, Colombia 1 ===
November 17 14:00 at Rod Carew Stadium
| Team | 1 | 2 | 3 | 4 | 5 | 6 | 7 | 8 | 9 | R | H | E |
|---|---|---|---|---|---|---|---|---|---|---|---|---|
| Colombia | 0 | 0 | 0 | 0 | 1 | 0 | 0 | 0 | 0 | 1 | 11 | 0 |
| Brazil | 0 | 0 | 0 | 1 | 1 | 1 | 3 | 1 | X | 7 | 11 | 0 |
WP: Carlos Yoshimura (1–0) LP: Cristian Mendoza (0–1); Attendance: 2,952 (10.9%); Umpires: HP − Angel Campos, 1B − Jair Fernandez, 2B − Clint Fagan, 3B − Cesar Valdes; Boxscore

=== Panama 6, Nicaragua 2 ===
November 17 20:00 at Rod Carew Stadium
| Team | 1 | 2 | 3 | 4 | 5 | 6 | 7 | 8 | 9 | R | H | E |
|---|---|---|---|---|---|---|---|---|---|---|---|---|
| Nicaragua | 0 | 0 | 0 | 0 | 0 | 1 | 1 | 0 | 0 | 2 | 12 | 2 |
| Panama | 1 | 1 | 0 | 2 | 0 | 0 | 1 | 1 | X | 6 | 9 | 1 |
WP: Gilberto Mendez (1–0) LP: Edgar Ramirez (0–1); Attendance: 8,531 (31.6%); Umpires: HP − Toby Basner, 1B − Clint Fagan, 2B − Domingo Polanco, 3B − Jair Fernandez; Boxscore

=== Panama 9, Colombia 7 ===
November 18 19:00 at Rod Carew Stadium
| Team | 1 | 2 | 3 | 4 | 5 | 6 | 7 | 8 | 9 | R | H | E |
|---|---|---|---|---|---|---|---|---|---|---|---|---|
| Panama | 0 | 5 | 0 | 1 | 0 | 1 | 2 | 0 | 0 | 9 | 11 | 1 |
| Colombia | 0 | 0 | 0 | 3 | 1 | 0 | 0 | 3 | 0 | 7 | 8 | 0 |
WP: Ramiro Mendoza (1–0) LP: Karl Triana (0–1); Home runs: PAN: Carlos Lee (1), Ruben Rivera (1); COL: None; Attendance: 5,317 (19.7%); Umpires: HP − Clint Fagan, 1B − Angel Campos, 2B − Jair Fernandez, 3B − Cesar Valdes; Boxscore

=== Brazil 1, Panama 0 ===
November 19 20:00 at Rod Carew Stadium
| Team | 1 | 2 | 3 | 4 | 5 | 6 | 7 | 8 | 9 | R | H | E |
|---|---|---|---|---|---|---|---|---|---|---|---|---|
| Panama | 0 | 0 | 0 | 0 | 0 | 0 | 0 | 0 | 0 | 0 | 3 | 0 |
| Brazil | 0 | 0 | 1 | 0 | 0 | 0 | 0 | 0 | X | 1 | 10 | 2 |
WP: Rafael Fernandes (1–0) LP: Angel Cuan (0−1) Sv: Thyago Vieira (2); Attendance: 10,638 (39.4%); Umpires: HP − Angel Campos, 1B − Toby Basner, 2B − Cesar Valdes, 3B − Domingo Polanco; Boxscore
