= Dowdy =

Dowdy is a surname. Common anglicisation of the ancient Irish surname Ó Dubhda (English: O'Dowd). Other anglicised variants are Dowd, Dawdy, Dowdy, O'Dowda and Dowds, with Doody and Duddy, found around Killarney, where a branch of the Connacht family settled. All are Ó Dubhda (pronounced O Dooda) in Irish, the root word being "dubh" black. A quite distinct minor sept of Ó Dubhda was located in County Londonderry.

Dowdy also means plain and unfashionable in style or dress. Lacking stylishness or neatness; shabby. Comparative is "dowdier", superlative "dowdiest".

== Notable people ==
Notable people with the surname include:

- Adam Dowdy (born 1975), American baseball umpire
- Bill Dowdy (1932–2017), American musician
- Cecil Dowdy (1945–2002), American football player, University of Alabama
- David Astor Dowdy Jr. (1933–2019), American businessman and sculptor
- Helen Dowdy, American actress
- Homer Dowdy (1922–2002), American writer
- John Dowdy (1912–1995), American politician
- Kyle Dowdy (born 1993), American baseball player
- Nancy M. Dowdy, American nuclear physicist
- Wayne Dowdy (born 1943), American politician

== See also ==
- O'Dowd, detailed history of the Irish Gaelic clan
- Dowdy–Ficklen Stadium, named after Ronald and Mary Ellen Dowdy
