= 2006 World Baseball Classic Pool C =

Pool C of the First Round of the 2006 World Baseball Classic was held at Hiram Bithorn Stadium, San Juan, Puerto Rico from March 7 to 10, 2006.

Pool C was a round-robin tournament. Each team played the other three teams once, with the top two teams advancing to Pool 2.

== Standings ==
Pos	Team	Pld	W	L	RF	RA	RD	PCT	GB	Qualification
1	Puerto Rico (H)	3	3	0	22	6	+16	1.000	—	Advance to second round
2	Cuba	3	2	1	21	20	+1	.667	1	Advance to second round
3	Netherlands	3	1	2	15	19	−4	.333	2	
4	Panama	3	0	3	7	20	−13	.000	3	

(H) Hosts

== Results ==
- All times are Atlantic Standard Time (UTC−04:00).

=== Puerto Rico 2, Panama 1 ===
March 7 20:00 at Hiram Bithorn Stadium
Team	1	2	3	4	5	6	7	8	9	R	H	E
Panama	0	0	0	1	0	0	0	0	0	1	5	1
Puerto Rico	0	0	0	0	2	0	0	0	X	2	5	0
WP: José Santiago (1–0) LP: Manny Acosta (0–1) Sv: Fernando Cabrera (1); Home runs: PAN: None; PUR: Alex Ríos (1); Attendance: 19,043 (105.8%); Umpires: HP − Tom Hallion, 1B − James Hoye, 2B − Kevin Causey, 3B − Ian McCabe; Boxscore

=== Cuba 8, Panama 6 ===
March 8 14:00 at Hiram Bithorn Stadium
Team	1	2	3	4	5	6	7	8	9	10	11	R	H	E
Cuba	0	0	2	0	0	0	2	0	2	0	2	8	11	0
Panama	0	1	0	0	0	3	0	0	2	0	0	6	10	0
WP: Yunesky Maya (1–0) LP: Jorge Cortez (0–1) Sv: Yadel Martí (1); Home runs: CUB: Yulieski Gourriel (1); PAN: Rubén Rivera (1); Attendance: 6,129 (34.1%); Umpires: HP − Adam Dowdy, 1B − Chad Fairchild, 2B − Rob Drake, 3B − Leone Pierfranco; Boxscore

=== Puerto Rico 8, Netherlands 3 ===
March 8 20:30 at Hiram Bithorn Stadium
Team	1	2	3	4	5	6	7	8	9	R	H	E
Puerto Rico	1	0	1	1	0	2	2	0	1	8	14	4
Netherlands	0	0	0	1	2	0	0	0	0	3	5	1
WP: Orlando Román (1–0) LP: Jair Jurrjens (0–1); Home runs: PUR: Javy López (1), Iván Rodríguez (1), Carlos Beltrán (1); NED: None; Attendance: 15,570 (86.5%); Umpires: HP − Kevin Causey, 1B − Tom Hallion, 2B − James Hoye, 3B − Ian McCabe; Boxscore

=== Cuba 11, Netherlands 2 ===
March 9 20:00 at Hiram Bithorn Stadium
Team	1	2	3	4	5	6	7	8	9	R	H	E
Cuba	2	0	0	4	0	0	4	0	1	11	16	1
Netherlands	0	0	0	0	0	2	0	0	0	2	5	3
WP: Ormari Romero (1–0) LP: Diego Markwell (0–1) Sv: Yadel Martí (2); Home runs: CUB: Yoandry Garlobo (1), Osmani Urrutia (1); NED: None; Attendance: 7,657 (42.5%); Umpires: HP − Chad Fairchild, 1B − Rob Drake, 2B − Adam Dowdy, 3B − Leone Pierfranco; Boxscore

=== Netherlands 10, Panama 0 ===
March 10 14:00 at Hiram Bithorn Stadium
Team	1	2	3	4	5	6	7	8	9	R	H	E
Netherlands	5	0	1	1	3	0	0	X	X	10	16	0
Panama	0	0	0	0	0	0	0	X	X	0	0	2
WP: Shairon Martis (1–0) LP: Miguel Gómez (0–1); Attendance: 6,337 (35.2%); Umpires: HP − James Hoye, 1B − Kevin Causey, 2B − Tom Hallion, 3B − Ian McCabe; Notes: Completed early due to 10–run mercy rule after 7 innings. Boxscore

=== Puerto Rico 12, Cuba 2 ===
March 10 20:30 at Hiram Bithorn Stadium
Team	1	2	3	4	5	6	7	8	9	R	H	E
Puerto Rico	0	2	0	5	5	0	0	X	X	12	10	2
Cuba	0	1	0	0	0	0	1	X	X	2	5	1
WP: Dicky Gonzalez (1–0) LP: Luis Borroto (0–1); Home runs: PUR: Bernie Williams (1), Alex Cintrón (1), Carlos Beltrán (2); CUB: None; Attendance: 19,736 (109.6%); Umpires: HP − Rob Drake, 1B − Adam Dowdy, 2B − Chad Fairchild, 3B − Leone Pierfranco; Notes: Completed early due to 10–run mercy rule after 7 innings. Boxscore
