= 2006 World Baseball Classic Pool 2 =

Pool 2 of the Second Round of the 2006 World Baseball Classic was held at Hiram Bithorn Stadium, San Juan, Puerto Rico from March 12 to 15, 2006.

Like the first round, Pool 2 was a round-robin tournament. The final two teams advanced to the semifinals.

== Standings ==
Pos	Team	Pld	W	L	RF	RA	RD	PCT	GB	Qualification
1	Dominican Republic	3	2	1	10	11	−1	.667 (Note: Dominican Republic defeated Cuba 7–3.)	—	Advance to championship round
2	Cuba	3	2	1	14	12	+2	.667	—	Advance to championship round
3	Venezuela	3	1	2	9	9	0	.333 (Note: Venezuela defeated Puerto Rico 6–0.)	1	
4	Puerto Rico (H)	3	1	2	10	11	−1	.333	1	

(H) Hosts

== Results ==
- All times are Atlantic Standard Time (UTC−04:00).

=== Cuba 7, Venezuela 2 ===
March 12 14:00 at Hiram Bithorn Stadium
Team	1	2	3	4	5	6	7	8	9	R	H	E
Cuba	0	1	0	0	0	5	1	0	0	7	10	1
Venezuela	0	0	0	0	0	0	2	0	0	2	5	0
WP: Yadel Martí (1–0) LP: Johan Santana (0–2) Sv: Pedro Luis Lazo (1); Home runs: CUB: Frederich Cepeda (1), Ariel Pestano (1); VEN: Endy Chávez (1); Attendance: 13,697 (76.1%); Umpires: HP − Tom Hallion, 1B − Lance Barksdale, 2B − Chad Fairchild, 3B − Ian McCabe; Boxscore

=== Puerto Rico 7, Dominican Republic 1 ===
March 12 21:00 at Hiram Bithorn Stadium
Team	1	2	3	4	5	6	7	8	9	R	H	E
Puerto Rico	0	0	0	1	0	3	3	0	0	7	13	1
Dominican Republic	0	1	0	0	0	0	0	0	0	1	6	2
WP: Javier Vázquez (1–0) LP: Dámaso Marte (0–1); Home runs: PUR: None; DOM: Adrián Beltré (4); Attendance: 19,692 (109.4%); Umpires: HP − Rob Drake, 1B − James Hoye, 2B − Adam Dowdy, 3B − Fred van Groningen; Boxscore

=== Dominican Republic 7, Cuba 3 ===
March 13 14:00 at Hiram Bithorn Stadium
Team	1	2	3	4	5	6	7	8	9	R	H	E
Dominican Republic	0	0	4	1	1	1	0	0	0	7	9	1
Cuba	0	0	0	0	0	0	1	0	2	3	8	2
WP: Odalis Pérez (2–0) LP: Vicyohandry Odelín (0–1) Sv: Fernando Rodney (1); Home runs: DOM: David Ortiz (3); CUB: Yulieski Gourriel (2); Attendance: 6,594 (36.6%); Umpires: HP − Lance Barksdale, 1B − Chad Fairchild, 2B − Tom Hallion, 3B − Ian McCabe; Boxscore

=== Venezuela 6, Puerto Rico 0 ===
March 13 20:00 at Hiram Bithorn Stadium
Team	1	2	3	4	5	6	7	8	9	R	H	E
Venezuela	0	0	0	0	2	0	0	4	0	6	6	2
Puerto Rico	0	0	0	0	0	0	0	0	0	0	7	0
WP: Carlos Zambrano (1–0) LP: Joel Piñeiro (0–1); Home runs: VEN: Endy Chávez (2), Víctor Martínez (1); PUR: None; Attendance: 19,400 (107.8%); Umpires: HP − James Hoye, 1B − Adam Dowdy, 2B − Rob Drake, 3B − Fred van Groningen; Boxscore

=== Dominican Republic 2, Venezuela 1 ===
March 14 20:00 at Hiram Bithorn Stadium
Team	1	2	3	4	5	6	7	8	9	R	H	E
Venezuela	0	0	0	0	0	1	0	0	0	1	1	1
Dominican Republic	1	0	0	0	0	0	1	0	X	2	6	1
WP: Miguel Batista (1–0) LP: Kelvim Escobar (1–1) Sv: Duaner Sánchez (1); Attendance: 13,007 (72.3%); Umpires: HP − Chad Fairchild, 1B − Tom Hallion, 2B − Lance Barksdale, 3B − Ian McCabe; Boxscore

=== Cuba 4, Puerto Rico 3 ===
March 15 20:00 at Hiram Bithorn Stadium
Team	1	2	3	4	5	6	7	8	9	R	H	E
Cuba	1	0	0	3	0	0	0	0	0	4	6	2
Puerto Rico	1	0	0	0	0	0	2	0	0	3	9	1
WP: Ormari Romero (2–0) LP: Dicky Gonzalez (1–1) Sv: Vicyohandry Odelín (1); Home runs: CUB: None; PUR: Bernie Williams (2); Attendance: 19,773 (109.9%); Umpires: HP − Adam Dowdy, 1B − Rob Drake, 2B − James Hoye, 3B − Fred van Groningen; Boxscore
