= 2013 World Baseball Classic Pool B =

Baseball competition

Pool B of the First Round of the 2013 World Baseball Classic was held at Intercontinental Baseball Stadium, Taichung, Taiwan from March 2 to 5, 2013.

Pool B was a round-robin tournament. Each team played the other three teams once, with the top two teams advancing to Pool 1.

== Standings ==
Pos	Team	Pld	W	L	RF	RA	RD	PCT	GB	Qualification
1	Chinese Taipei (H)	3	2	1	14	7	+7	.667 (Note: Chinese Taipei 0.235 TQB, Netherlands 0.000 TQB, South Korea -0.235 TQB)	—	Advance to second round Qualification for 2017 World Baseball Classic
2	Netherlands	3	2	1	12	9	+3	.667	—	Advance to second round Qualification for 2017 World Baseball Classic
3	South Korea	3	2	1	9	7	+2	.667	—	Qualification for 2017 World Baseball Classic
4	Australia	3	0	3	2	14	−12	.000	2	

Rules for classification: Tiebreakers
(H) Hosts
Notes:

Pool B MVP: (Chinese Taipei) Dai-Kang Yang

== Results ==
- All times are Taiwan National Standard Time (UTC+08:00).

=== Chinese Taipei 4, Australia 1 ===
March 2 12:30 at Intercontinental Baseball Stadium
Team	1	2	3	4	5	6	7	8	9	R	H	E
Australia	0	0	0	0	0	0	1	0	0	1	5	0
Chinese Taipei	1	0	2	0	1	0	0	0	X	4	10	0
WP: Chien-Ming Wang (1−0) LP: Chris Oxspring (0−1) Sv: Hung-wen Chen (1); Home runs: AUS: Stefan Welch (1); TPE: Cheng-min Peng (1); Attendance: 20,035 (100.2%); Umpires: HP − Kenjiro Mori, 1B − Lance Barksdale, 2B − Greg Gibson, 3B − Cesar Valdes; Boxscore

=== Netherlands 5, South Korea 0 ===
March 2 19:30 at Intercontinental Baseball Stadium
Team	1	2	3	4	5	6	7	8	9	R	H	E
South Korea	0	0	0	0	0	0	0	0	0	0	4	4
Netherlands	0	1	0	0	2	0	2	0	X	5	10	0
WP: Diego Markwell (1−0) LP: Suk-min Yoon (0−1); Attendance: 1,085 (5.4%); Umpires: HP − Paul Emmel, 1B − Lance Barksdale, 2B − Trevor Grieve, 3B − Cesar Valdes; Boxscore

The Netherlands earned their first win against 2009 finalists South Korea. South Korea committed four errors while accumulating a run deficit in the pool that would eventually lead to their elimination on tiebreakers.

=== Chinese Taipei 8, Netherlands 3 ===
March 3 14:30 at Intercontinental Baseball Stadium
Team	1	2	3	4	5	6	7	8	9	R	H	E
Netherlands	0	3	0	0	0	0	0	0	0	3	1	1
Chinese Taipei	0	1	0	4	0	3	0	0	X	8	7	1
WP: Wei-lun Pan (1–0) LP: Tom Stuifbergen (0–1); Home runs: NED: None; TPE: Dai-Kang Yang (1); Attendance: 22,689 (113.4%); Umpires: HP − Lance Barksdale, 1B − Cesar Valdes, 2B − Paul Emmel, 3B − Kenjiro Mori; Boxscore

Overcoming an early deficit, Chinese Taipei scored a convincing win over the Netherlands, putting it into a commanding position as it went into the pool's final game against South Korea.

=== South Korea 6, Australia 0 ===
March 4 18:30 at Intercontinental Baseball Stadium
Team	1	2	3	4	5	6	7	8	9	R	H	E
South Korea	3	1	0	0	0	0	1	0	1	6	11	0
Australia	0	0	0	0	0	0	0	0	0	0	6	1
WP: Seung-jun Song (1–0) LP: Ryan Searle (0–1); Attendance: 1,481 (7.4%); Umpires: HP − Greg Gibson, 1B − Paul Emmel, 2B − Trevor Grieve, 3B − Cesar Valdes; Boxscore

=== Netherlands 4, Australia 1 ===
March 5 12:30 at Intercontinental Baseball Stadium
Team	1	2	3	4	5	6	7	8	9	R	H	E
Australia	0	0	0	0	0	0	1	0	0	1	8	2
Netherlands	1	3	0	0	0	0	0	0	X	4	8	1
WP: Rob Cordemans (1–0) LP: Dushan Ruzic (0–1) Sv: Loek van Mil (1); Home runs: AUS: None; NED: Jonathan Schoop (1); Attendance: 1,113 (5.6%); Umpires: HP − Lance Barksdale, 1B − Kenjiro Mori, 2B − Greg Gibson, 3B − Trevor Grieve; Boxscore

The Netherlands took an early lead and did not relinquish it. With the win, the Netherlands clinched at least a three-way tie for the two second-round berths, and its favorable position with respect to tiebreakers meant that it was assured of advancing regardless of the outcome of the final game between Chinese Taipei and South Korea.

=== South Korea 3, Chinese Taipei 2 ===
March 5 19:30 at Intercontinental Baseball Stadium
Team	1	2	3	4	5	6	7	8	9	R	H	E
Chinese Taipei	0	0	1	1	0	0	0	0	0	2	9	1
South Korea	0	0	0	0	0	0	0	3	X	3	8	1
WP: Won-sam Jang (1–0) LP: Hong-Chih Kuo (0–1) Sv: Seung-hwan Oh (1); Home runs: TPE: None; KOR: Jung-ho Kang (1); Attendance: 23,431 (117.2%); Umpires: HP − Paul Emmel, 1B − Greg Gibson, 2B − Kenjiro Mori, 3B − Trevor Grieve; Boxscore

South Korea went into the final game needing not only to win (which would cause a three-way tie for the two second-round berths) but to win by at least five runs in order to have a chance of advancing on tiebreakers. Although Chinese Taipei lost its 2−0 lead in Korea's three-run eighth-inning rally, and then lost the game, they emerged as winners of the pool and of the second-round berth since Korea's margin of victory was only one run.

== See also ==
- List of sporting events in Taiwan
