= Hiram Bithorn Stadium =

Baseball stadium in San Juan, Puerto Rico

- Estadio Hiram Birthorn
- Bithorn
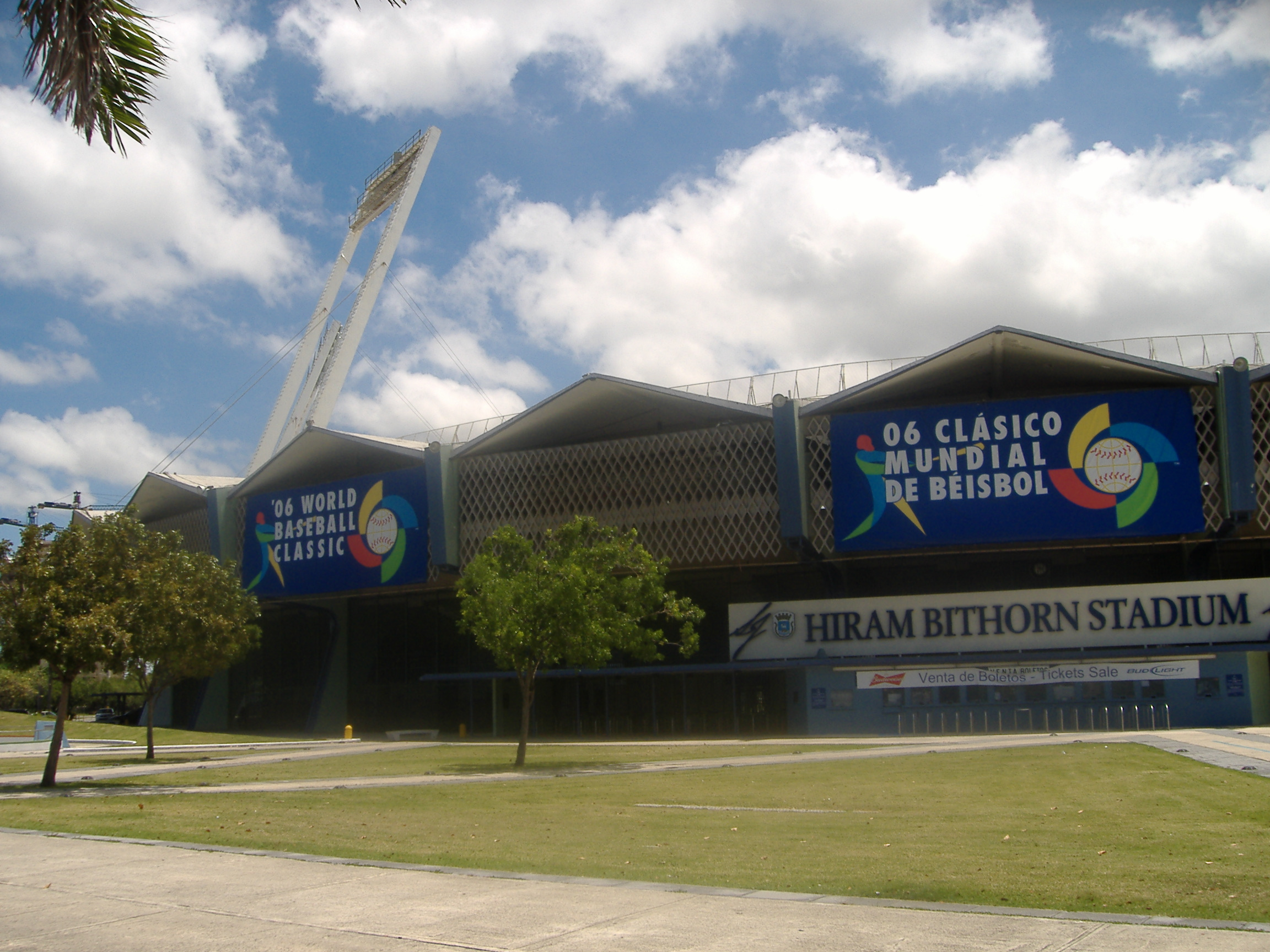
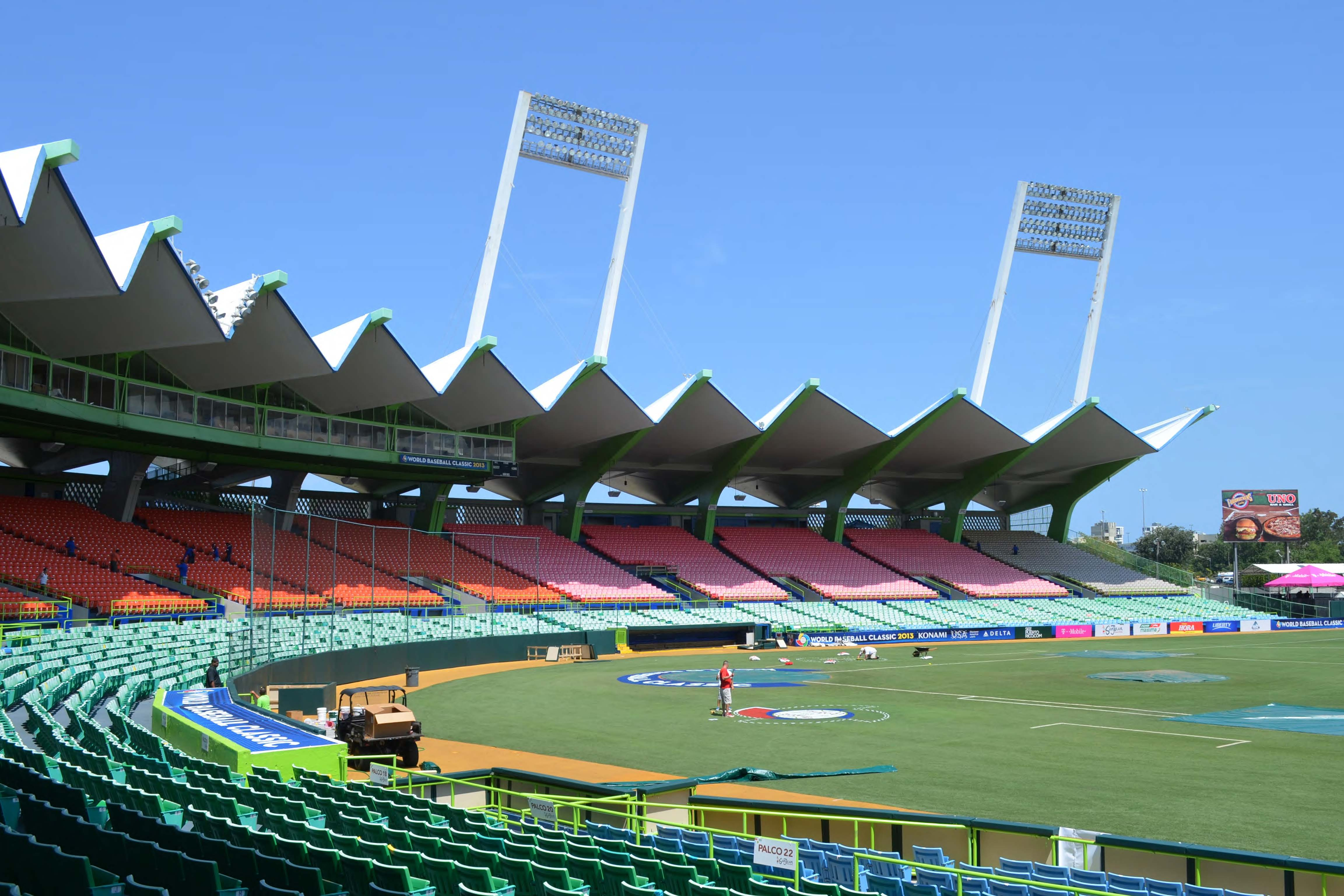
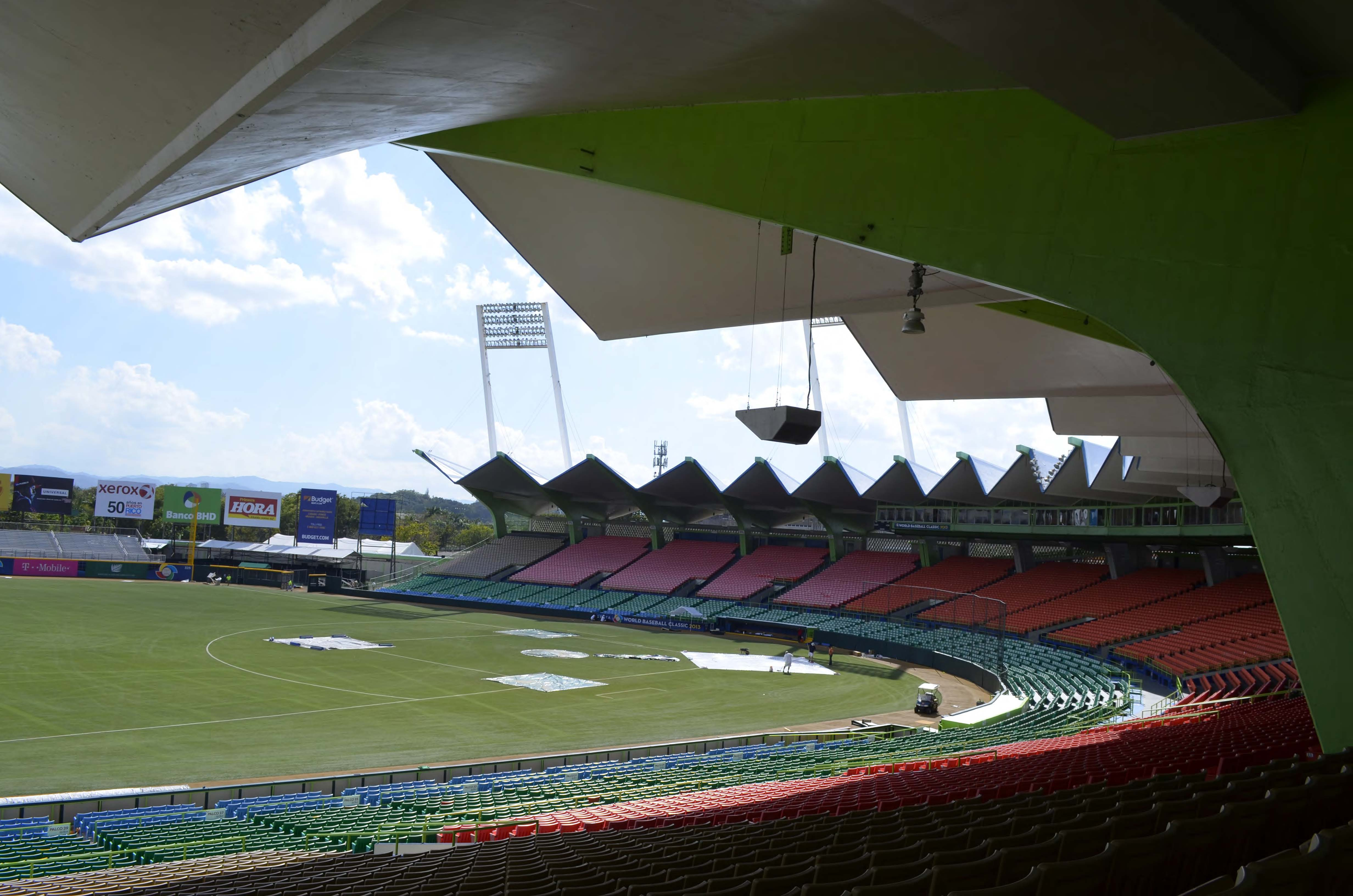
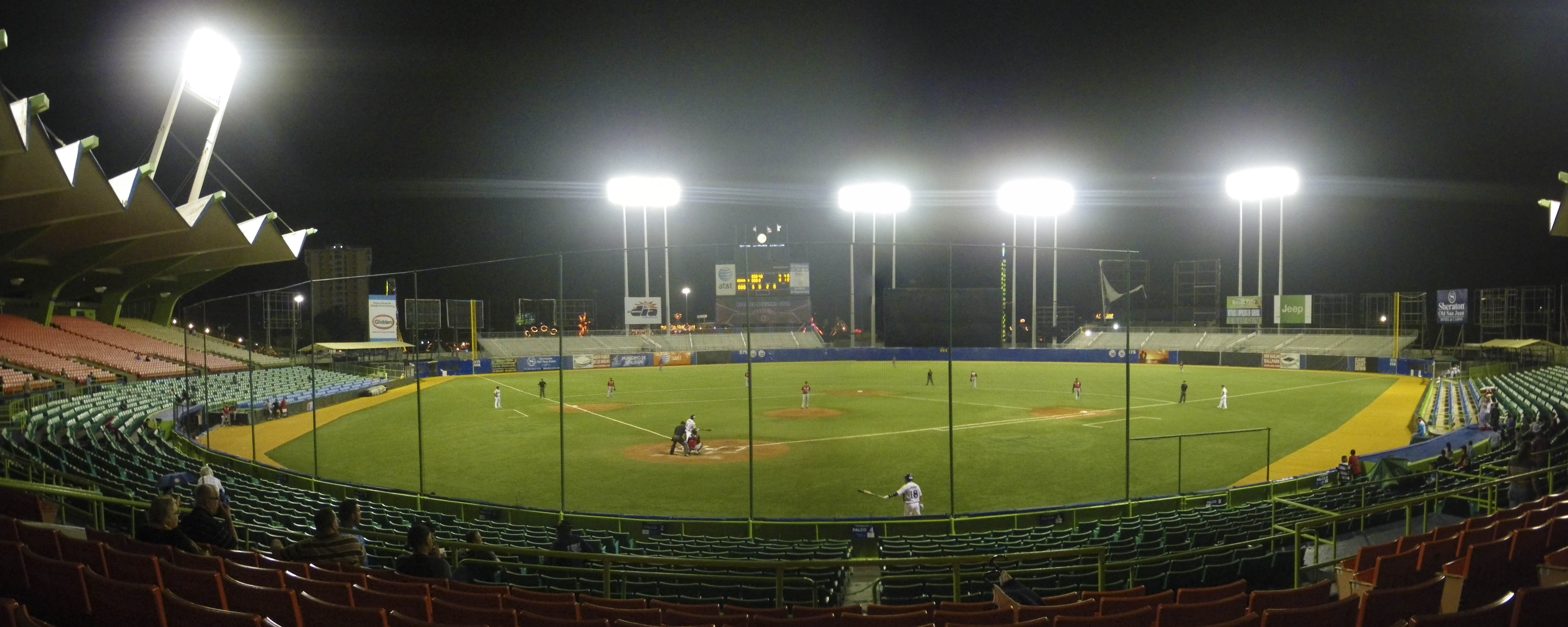
- Main entrance, 2007 Grandstand and pitch, 2010–2013

- Aerial view of Hiram Bithorn Stadium (center) and Roberto Clemente Coliseum (right), 2010
- Interactive map of Hiram Bithorn Stadium
- Location: Hato Rey Norte, San Juan, Puerto Rico
- Coordinates: 18°25′0″N 66°4′23″W
- Owner: San Juan Municipality
- Capacity: +19,125 (baseball) +35,000 (concerts)
- Surface: Natural grass (1962–1994); AstroTurf (1995–2003); FieldTurf (2004–2015); Turf Nation (2015–present)
- Field size: Left Field – 325 ft (99 m); Left-Center – 375 ft (114 m); Center Field – 404 ft (123 m); Right-Center – 375 ft (114 m); Right Field – 325 ft (99 m); Backstop – 60 ft (18 m)
- Acreage: 91,035 m^{2} (979,890 sq ft)

Construction
- Built: 1962
- Opened: October 24, 1962
- Cost: 4.3M
- Architects: Orval E. Sifontes and Alexander Papesh under Pedro A. Miranda & Associates
- Structural engineer: Martinez y Costa
- General contractors: R.P. Farnsworth & Co.

Tenants
- Senadores de San Juan (LBPRC) (1962–1974, 1984–2000, 2003–2004, 2010–2011, 2014–2015, 2024–present); Cangrejeros de Santurce (LBPRC) (1962–1982, 1989–2004, 2008–2009, 2012–present); RA12 (LBPRC) (2020–2024); Montreal Expos (MLB)(2003–2004; secondary); Atléticos de San Juan (PRSL) (2008–2011); Academia Quintana (PRSL) (2008–2011)
- Hiram Bithorn Municipal Stadium
- U.S. National Register of Historic Places
- NRHP reference No.: 13001118
- Added to NRHP: 22 January 2014

Hiram Bithorn Stadium (Spanish: Estadio Hiram Bithorn), popularly known as the Bithorn, is the largest multi-purpose baseball stadium in Puerto Rico since opening in 1962. Located nearby the José Miguel Agrelot Coliseum and in same complex as the Roberto Clemente Coliseum in the Hato Rey business center of San Juan, the capital city and municipality of the archipelago and island, the stadium is named after the first Puerto Rican to play in Major League Baseball, pitcher Hiram Bithorn, who debuted with the Chicago Cubs in 1942. It has a capacity of at least 19,125 spectators for baseball games and 35,000 spectators for concerts, making it the seventh biggest in the insular Caribbean, after six stadiums in Cuba. The Tropical Modern style edifice was added to the National Register of Historic Places in 2014.

Owned and operated by the municipal government of San Juan, the stadium serves as home field for the Cangrejeros de Santurce and the Senadores de San Juan, two Puerto Rican Baseball League teams based in San Juan who have intermittently used it as their home since 1962. It was also a secondary home to the Montreal Expos of Major League Baseball in 2003 and 2004.

The stadium has hosted various major baseball events, including the World Baseball Classic in 2006, 2009, 2013, and 2026, and the Caribbean Series in 1999, 2015, and 2020. It has also housed concerts by various artists, including Whitney Houston, Shakira, Rihanna, and Bad Bunny.

== Capacity ==
The Hiram Bithorn Stadium has a capacity of at least 19,125 spectators for baseball games. It accommodated a record 19,736 people during the Puerto Rico vs. Cuba first round game of the World Baseball Classic in 2006. The stadium also has a capacity of at least 35,000 spectators for concerts, as it was confirmed during the "P FKN R" shows by Bad Bunny in 2021.

== Dimensions ==
The Hiram Bithorn Stadium is 325 feet (99 m) down the left-field line, 325 feet (99 m) down the right-field line and 404 feet (123 m) to center field. The fences are 8 feet (2.5 m) high. When the Montreal Expos played home games at the stadium, the field dimensions were set to match Olympic Stadium in Montreal.

== History ==
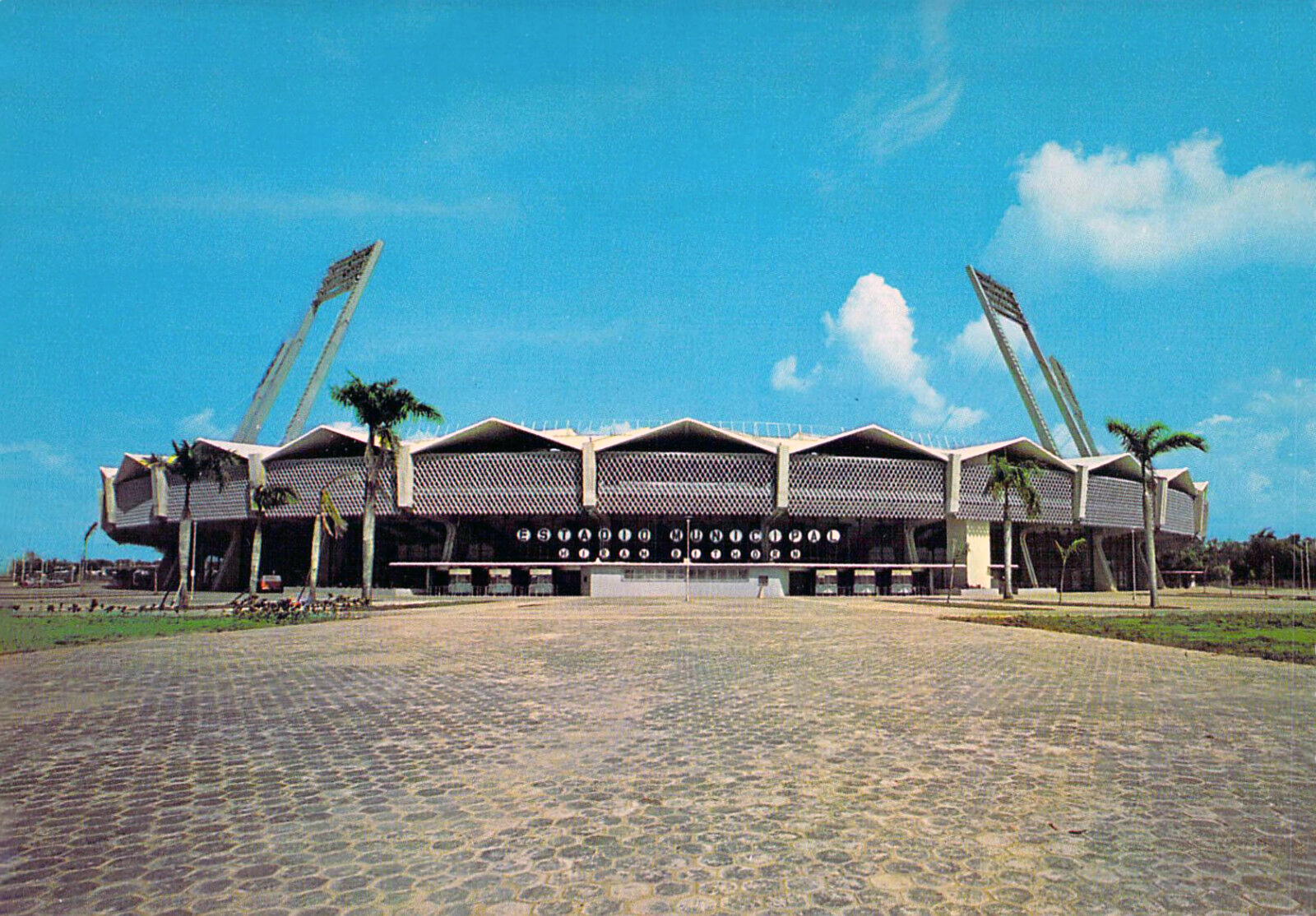
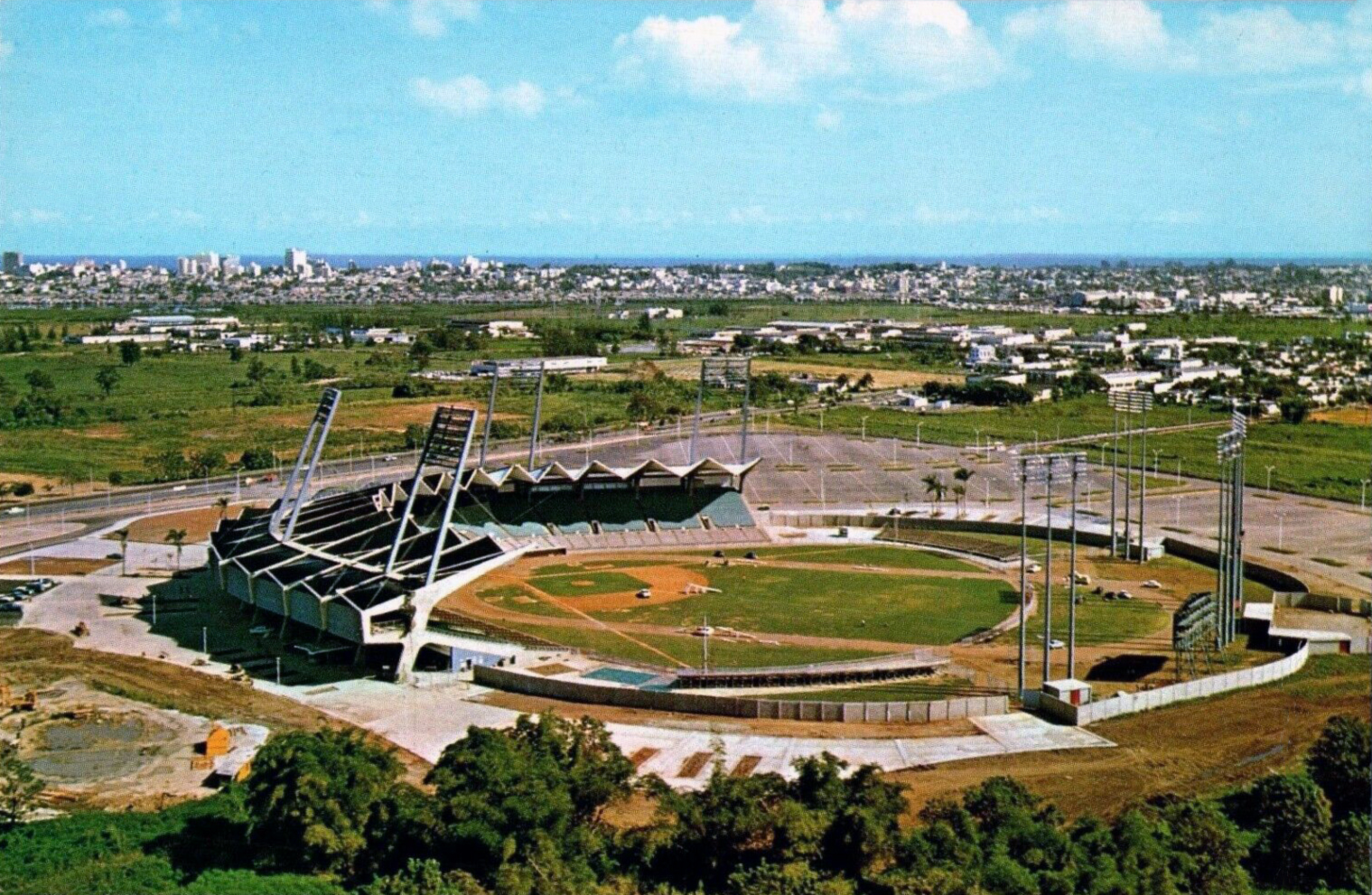
Hiram Bithorn Stadium in 1964

The Hiram Bithorn Stadium was opened on October 24, 1962 in San Juan, Puerto Rico. It was built in the Hato Rey barrio under the mayoral administration of Felisa Rincón de Gautier as a replacement for the Estadio Sixto Escobar in the nearby San Juan Islet, which had served the area since 1932.

The first outdoor National Basketball Association game was played between the Phoenix Suns and the Milwaukee Bucks on September 24, 1972, during that year's preseason. The Suns defeated the Bucks, 116–103.

In the mid-1990s, Hiram Bithorn Stadium was planned to be the home of the yet-to-be-named Puerto Rico team, a charter franchise of the United League (UL) which was a planned third league of Major League Baseball (MLB).

The stadium hosted Major League Baseball's Opening Day Game on April 1, 2001, in which the Toronto Blue Jays defeated the Texas Rangers, 8–1. However, 4,000 fans who purchased tickets to the game were denied entry when the police determined the safe capacity of the park had been vastly exceeded.

It was the object of a major overhaul under the mayoral administration of Jorge Santini, before becoming the part-time home of the Montreal Expos of the National League in 2003 and 2004 before their move to Washington, D.C. as the Washington Nationals. The Expos played 20 "home" games across the two seasons as a result of poor attendance at their home Olympic Stadium in Montreal. Before Major League Baseball's announcement of the Montreal Expos' move to Washington, Puerto Rico and San Juan made an effort to lure the Expos franchise to the island territory permanently.

Hiram Bithorn Stadium hosted parts of the first two rounds of the 2006 World Baseball Classic. Pool C, which included the teams of Puerto Rico, Cuba, Panama, and the Netherlands. It also hosted Pool 2 of the second round of the Classic which featured Cuba, Puerto Rico, the Dominican Republic, and Venezuela, the top two finishers from Pool C and Pool D. Pool D games of the 2009 World Baseball Classic were played there between March 7 and March 11, 2009. The Hiram Bithorn Stadium hosted the 2013 World Baseball Classic with Puerto Rico, Venezuela, the Dominican Republic and newcomers Spain in Pool C.

In 2008, it served as the stadium for Atléticos de San Juan and Academia Quintana, two soccer teams in the Puerto Rico Soccer League, Puerto Rico's first-ever professional soccer league.

At the end of June 2010, Major League Baseball returned to the stadium, as the Florida Marlins faced the New York Mets in a three-game series; the Marlins took two out of three games from the Mets.

The Marlins were to play the Pittsburgh Pirates on May 30 and 31, 2016 in honor of Roberto Clemente Day. However, on May 6, 2016, it was announced that the Puerto Rico games would be postponed due to the Zika virus outbreak, and moved to Marlins Park.

The Hiram Bithorn Stadium was damaged as a result of Hurricane Maria on September 20, 2017.

The Cleveland Indians and Minnesota Twins split a two-game series at Hiram Bithorn Stadium in April 2018. It was the first time since 2010 that a Major League Baseball regular-season game was played in Puerto Rico. Furthermore, the league announced in August 2019 that they would be returning for a three-game series in April 2020 between the Miami Marlins and New York Mets. This series was later cancelled as a result of the COVID-19 pandemic.

There have been, as of June 2020, 71 professional boxing events that have been held at the stadium, including many world championship fights. Two-time World Lightweight Champion Carlos Ortíz won four Lightweight title bouts in the stadium, regaining his championship from Ismael Laguna in 1965 and retaining it against Doug Valiant in 1963, Kenny Lane in 1964, and Sugar Ramos in 1967. Also, former world heavyweight champion Floyd Patterson fought there late in his career.

In 2025, the stadium underwent renovations to accommodate the 2026 World Baseball Classic.

== Other uses ==
Along with sporting events, the stadium has hosted concerts by many popular artists.

Metallica were scheduled to perform during their Nowhere Else to Roam Tour on April 28, 1993, but it was rained out and never rescheduled.

Shakira has performed twice, during her Tour Anfibio, on April 9, 2000, and during the Tour of the Mongoose, on March 22, 2003.

On March 10, 11, and 12 of 2023, the Colombian singer Karol G performed three special shows at the stadium, in support of her 2023 album Mañana Será Bonito. Special guests included Bad Gyal, Feid, Maldy, Romeo Santos, and Sean Paul.

Some of the concerts that have been held at the venue:

- The Byrds – April 30, 1967
- Los Ángeles Negros – May 4, 1971
- Santana – October 31, 1971
- The Jackson Five – July 17, 1973
- Blue Angel/Peter Frampton – August 22, 1981
- Blue Öyster Cult – October 28, 1983
- Bon Jovi/Scorpions: Love At First Sting Tour – July 13, 1984
- Black Jack/Ozzy Osbourne: Bark At The Moon Tour – August 4, 1984
- The Motels/Men At Work – August 2, 1985
- Sting – November 9, 1985
- Cinderella/Bon Jovi: Slippery When Wet Tour – February 21, 1987
- The Beach Boys – April 4, 1987
- Poison/Ratt: Dancing Undercover Tour – June 12, 1987
- Toto/Rod Stewart: Out of Order Tour – July 1, 1988
- Stryper: In God We Trust Tour – January 14, 1989
- Whitney Houston: The Bodyguard World Tour – April 24, 1994
- Phil Collins: Both Sides Tour – April 29, 1995
- Laura Pausini: World Wide Tour – May 10, 1997
- Olga Tañón - Ardiente - October 11, 1997
- Billy Joel – February 11, 1999
- Maná: Unplugged – May 6, 2000
- Backstreet Boys – May 19 & 20, 2001 - Black & Blue Tour
- Mega Electronic Fest: March 19, 2011, March 17, 2012, and March 16, 2013
- Rihanna: Diamonds World Tour – October 29, 2013
- Bad Bunny: P FKN R – December 10–11, 2021
- Daddy Yankee: La Última Vuelta World Tour – January 6–8, 2023 (final performances of Daddy Yankee's career)
- Karol G: Mañana Será Bonito - March 10, 11 & 12, 2023
- Rauw Alejandro: Saturno World Tour - March 31, 2023 and April 1, 2023
- Romeo Santos: Formula, Vol. 3: The Tour — May 20–21, 2023

Professional Wrestling:

- WWC Anniversary Show 1984 - September 14, 1984 (Attendance: 34,383)
- WWF – October 19, 1985

== See also ==
- National Register of Historic Places listings in metropolitan San Juan, Puerto Rico
