= 2006 World Baseball Classic Pool D =

Pool D of the First Round of the 2006 World Baseball Classic was held at Cracker Jack Stadium, Kissimmee, Florida, United States from March 7 to 10, 2006.

Pool D was a round-robin tournament. Each team played the other three teams once, with the top two teams advancing to Pool 2.

== Standings ==
Pos	Team	Pld	W	L	RF	RA	RD	PCT	GB	Qualification
1	Dominican Republic	3	3	0	25	12	+13	1.000	—	Advance to second round
2	Venezuela	3	2	1	13	11	+2	.667	1	Advance to second round
3	Italy	3	1	2	13	14	−1	.333	2	
4	Australia	3	0	3	4	18	−14	.000	3	

== Results ==
- All times are Eastern Standard Time (UTC−05:00).

=== Dominican Republic 11, Venezuela 5 ===
March 7 13:00 at Cracker Jack Stadium
Team	1	2	3	4	5	6	7	8	9	R	H	E
Dominican Republic	0	2	0	0	4	0	0	0	5	11	13	1
Venezuela	0	0	0	1	2	1	1	0	0	5	10	1
WP: Bartolo Colón (1–0) LP: Johan Santana (0–1); Home runs: DOM: David Ortiz 2 (2), Adrián Beltré 2 (2); VEN: Miguel Cabrera (1), Edgardo Alfonzo (1); Attendance: 10,645 (112.1%); Umpires: HP − Lance Barksdale, 1B − Troy Fullwood, 2B − Dusty Dellinger, 3B − Fred van Groningen; Boxscore

=== Italy 10, Australia 0 ===
March 7 20:00 at Cracker Jack Stadium
Team	1	2	3	4	5	6	7	8	9	R	H	E
Australia	0	0	0	0	0	0	0	X	X	0	1	2
Italy	0	3	1	1	2	2	1	X	X	10	12	0
WP: Jason Grilli (1–0) LP: John Stephens (0–1); Home runs: AUS: None; ITA: Mark Saccomanno (1), Vince Sinisi (1); Attendance: 8,099 (85.3%); Umpires: HP − Casey Moser, 1B − Scott Barry, 2B − Ed Hickox, 3B − Carlos Rey; Notes: Completed early due to 10–run mercy rule after 7 innings. Two outs when last run scored. Boxscore

=== Venezuela 6, Italy 0 ===
March 8 19:00 at Cracker Jack Stadium
Team	1	2	3	4	5	6	7	8	9	R	H	E
Italy	0	0	0	0	0	0	0	0	0	0	2	1
Venezuela	1	0	1	1	1	0	2	0	X	6	9	2
WP: Freddy García (1–0) LP: Lenny DiNardo (0–1); Home runs: ITA: None; VEN: Miguel Cabrera (2); Attendance: 10,101 (106.3%); Umpires: HP − Ed Hickox, 1B − Casey Moser, 2B − Scott Barry, 3B − Carlos Rey; Boxscore

=== Dominican Republic 8, Italy 3 ===
March 9 13:00 at Cracker Jack Stadium
Team	1	2	3	4	5	6	7	8	9	R	H	E
Italy	1	0	2	0	0	0	0	0	0	3	5	2
Dominican Republic	2	0	2	0	3	0	1	0	X	8	11	0
WP: Odalis Pérez (1–0) LP: Lenny DiNardo (0–1); Home runs: ITA: None; DOM: Albert Pujols (1), Adrián Beltré (3), Moisés Alou (1); Attendance: 9,949 (104.7%); Umpires: HP − Troy Fullwood, 1B − Dusty Dellinger, 2B − Lance Barksdale, 3B − Fred van Groningen; Boxscore

=== Venezuela 2, Australia 0 ===
March 9 20:00 at Cracker Jack Stadium
Team	1	2	3	4	5	6	7	8	9	R	H	E
Venezuela	0	1	0	0	0	1	0	0	0	2	4	0
Australia	0	0	0	0	0	0	0	0	0	0	1	0
WP: Kelvim Escobar (1–0) LP: Phil Brassington (0–1) Sv: Francisco Rodríguez (1); Home runs: VEN: Ramón Hernández (1); AUS: None; Attendance: 10,111 (106.4%); Umpires: HP − Scott Barry, 1B − Ed Hickox, 2B − Casey Moser, 3B − Carlos Rey; Boxscore

=== Dominican Republic 6, Australia 4 ===
March 10 19:00 at Cracker Jack Stadium
Team	1	2	3	4	5	6	7	8	9	R	H	E
Australia	1	0	0	0	0	1	0	0	2	4	7	1
Dominican Republic	0	3	1	1	0	1	0	0	X	6	8	2
WP: Daniel Cabrera (1–0) LP: Damian Moss (0–1) Sv: Dámaso Marte (1); Attendance: 11,083 (116.7%); Umpires: HP − Dusty Dellinger, 1B − Lance Barksdale, 2B − Troy Fullwood, 3B − Fred van Groningen; Boxscore
