= Dai-Kang Yang =

Taiwanese baseball player (born 1987)

Yang Dai-Kang
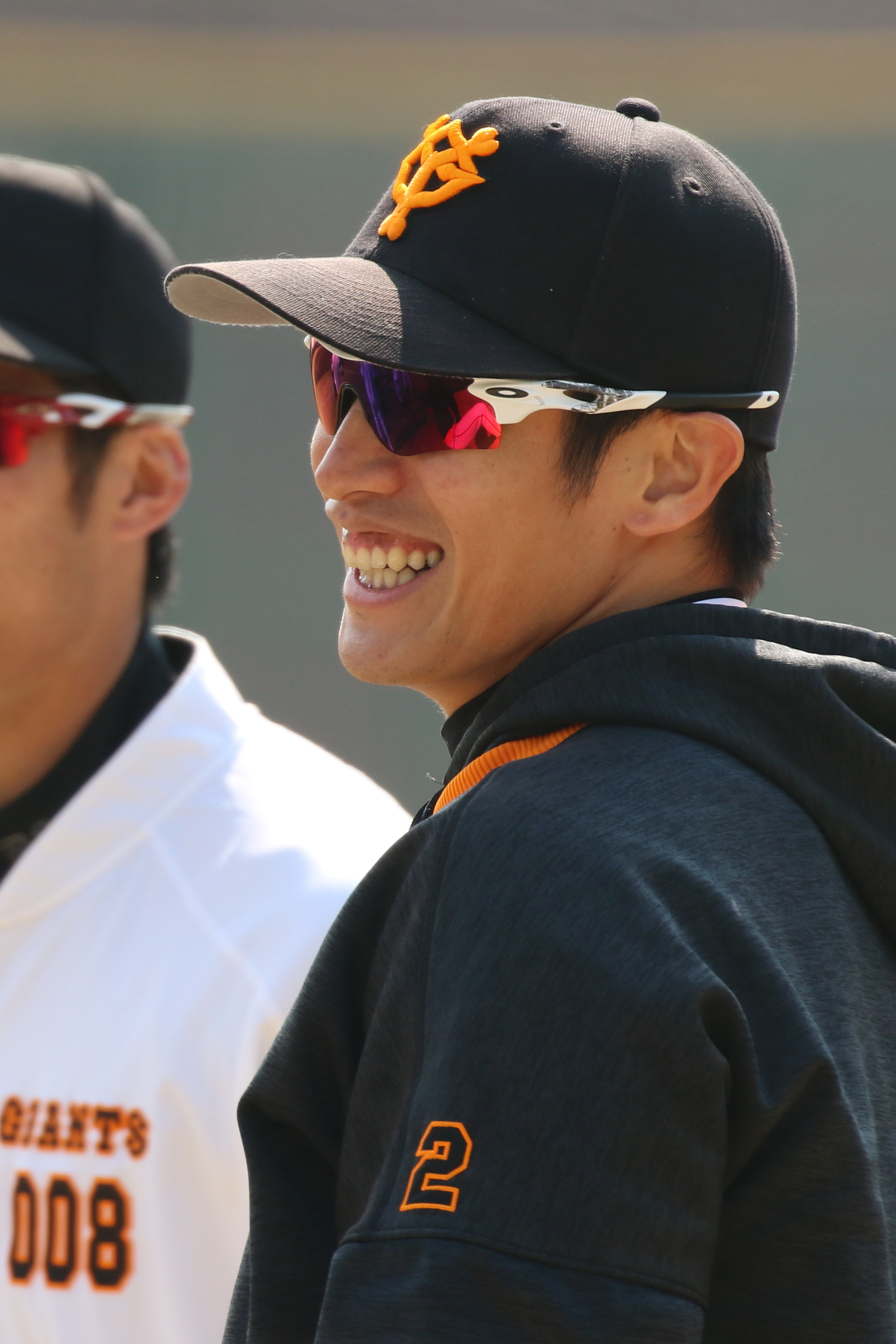
- Yang with the Yomiuri Giants in 2017

Oisix Niigata Albirex – No. 1
- Outfielder
- Born: January 17, 1987 (age 39); Taitung, Taiwan
- Batted: Right Threw: Right

NPB debut
- April 20, 2007, for the Hokkaido Nippon-Ham Fighters

Last NPB appearance
- September 11, 2021, for the Yomiuri Giants

NPB statistics
- Batting average: .270
- Home runs: 105
- Runs batted in: 482
- Stolen bases: 141
- Stats at Baseball Reference

Teams
- Hokkaido Nippon-Ham Fighters (2007–2016); Yomiuri Giants (2017–2021)

Career highlights and awards
- Japan Series champion (2016); 3× NPB All-Star (2012–2014); 3× Pacific League Golden Glove Award (2012–2014); Pacific League stolen base champion (2013)

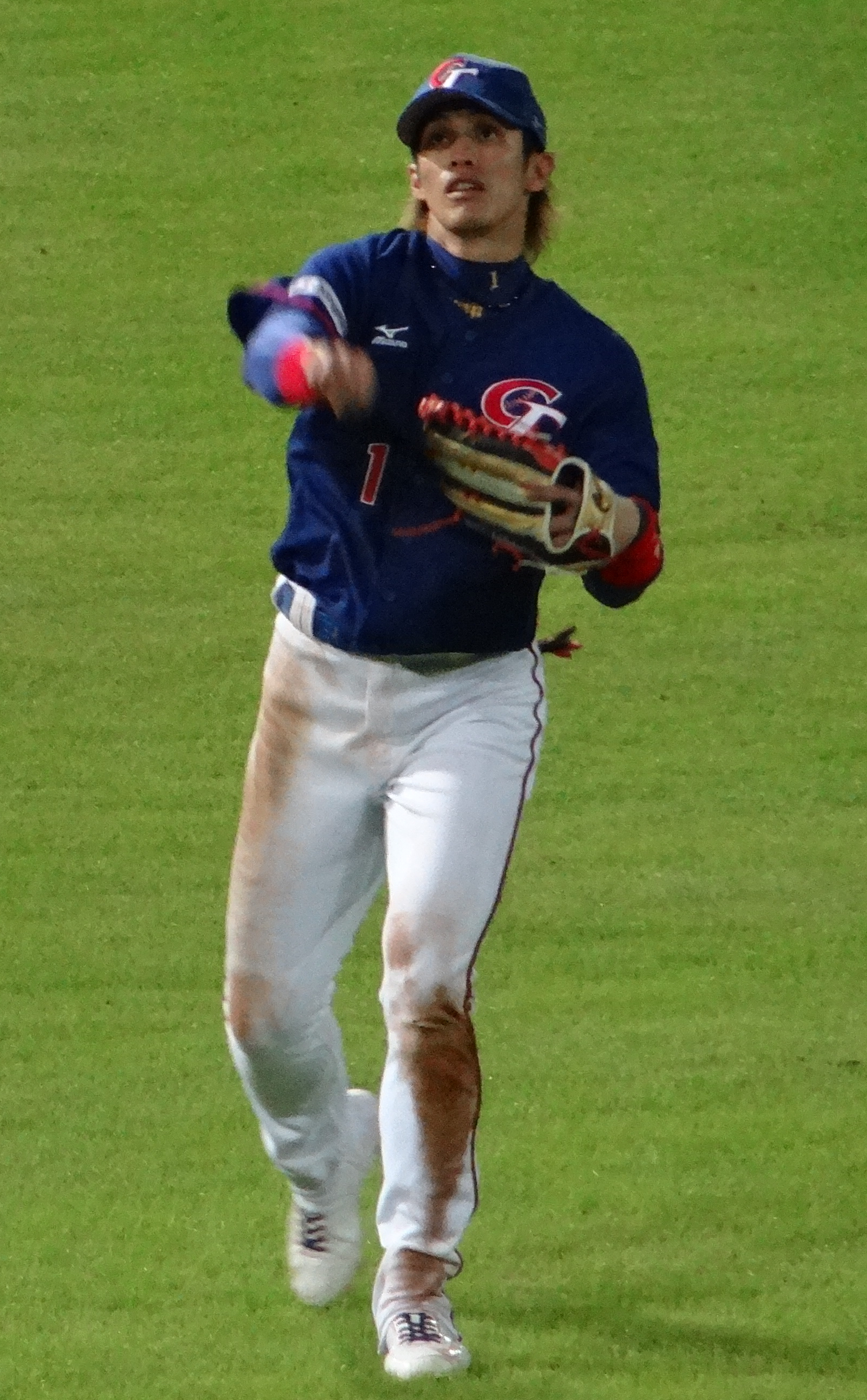
Yang playing for the Chinese Taipei national team in 2015 WBSC Premier12 warm-up game

Yang Dai-Kang (Chinese: 陽岱鋼; pinyin: Yáng Dàigāng, a.k.a. Daikan Yoh (Japanese: 陽岱鋼, Hepburn: Yō Daikan); born January 17, 1987, Taitung City, Taitung County, Taiwan; previously known as Yang Chung-shou or Chung-Shou Yang 陽仲壽) is a Taiwanese professional baseball outfielder for the Oisix Niigata Albirex. He previously played in Nippon Professional Baseball (NPB) for the Hokkaido Nippon-Ham Fighters and Yomiuri Giants.

== Early life ==
Yang was born in Taitung City, Taitung County, Taiwan on January 17, 1987. After graduating from National Taitung University Affiliated Physical Education Senior High School's middle school, he attended Fukuoka Daiichi High School in Japan.

During his three years in high school, he hit a total of 39 home runs. This, along with his speed (running 50m in 5.9 seconds) and arm strength (capable of throwing up to 110m) earned him the nickname of "High Schools' Number One Shortstop".

== Career ==
=== Nippon Ham Fighters ===
The Hokkaido Nippon-Ham Fighters of Nippon Professional Baseball selected Yang in the first round of the 2006 NPB Draft. Yang was called up to the Fighters from the reserve team on April 19, 2007.

Yang is a two-time Nippon Professional Baseball All-Star Series Game MVP, winning the honour in Game 3 of 2012 and Game 2 of 2014.

Yang has won the Nippon Professional Baseball Gold Glove Award twice in 2012 and 2013.

2013 was the best season of Yang's career, where he batted .282 along with 18 homeruns, 67 RBIs, and a league-leading 47 stolen bases.

At the end of the 2016 season after helping the Fighters to victory in the Pacific League and Japan Series, Yang elected for free agency.

=== Yomiuri Giants ===
On 14 December 2016 it was announced that Yang would be joining the Yomiuri Giants. Yang departed the NPB after the 2021 season, having recorded a batting average of .270 over 1,322 games played, as well as 1,164 hits, 105 home runs, 141 stolen bases, and 482 runs batted in.

=== Lake Country DockHounds ===
On February 23, 2022, Yang signed with the Lake Country DockHounds of the American Association of Professional Baseball. He played in 79 games for the DockHounds, slashing .260/.357/.432 with 9 home runs, 35 RBI, and 7 stolen bases. On February 14, 2023, Yang was released by Lake Country.

=== High Point Rockers ===
On March 6, 2023, Yang signed with the High Point Rockers of the Atlantic League of Professional Baseball. In 98 games for the Rockers, Yang hit .271/.384/.409 with 10 home runs, 58 RBI, and 6 stolen bases.

=== Oisix Niigata Albirex ===
On February 3, 2024, Yang signed with the Oisix Niigata Albirex of the Baseball Challenge League. In July 2026, Yang announced his retirement from professional baseball.

== International career ==
Yang played for the Chinese Taipei national baseball team at the 2006 World Baseball Classic. He went 0 for 3 with two strikeouts as the backup SS to Chin-Lung Hu.

In the 2006 Intercontinental Cup, Yang batted .267/.371/.567 and scored 9 runs, tying Michel Enriquez and Yulieski Gourriel for the tournament lead.

Yang was 1 for 1 for Taiwan in the 2007 Asian Championship, backing up Tai-Shan Chang at third base.

Yang batted 4-for-12 with a home run and four RBI in the first round of the 2013 World Baseball Classic. Yang was the Most Valuable Player of Pool B.

Yang batted 4 for 17 with a home run and three RBI during the 2015 WBSC Premier12.

During the 2017 Asia Professional Baseball Championship, Yang batted 2 for 7.

And also, on November 16, 2018, he was selected for the Yomiuri Giants roster at the 2018 MLB Japan All-Star Series exhibition game against MLB All-Stars.

== Personal ==
Yang is the brother of Yao-Hsun Yang, a cousin of Chih-Yuan Chen and a nephew of Tai-Shan Chang. He is also related more distantly to Chien-Fu Yang, Cheng-Wei Chang and Sen Yang.
