= Toby Basner =

American baseball umpire (born 1984)

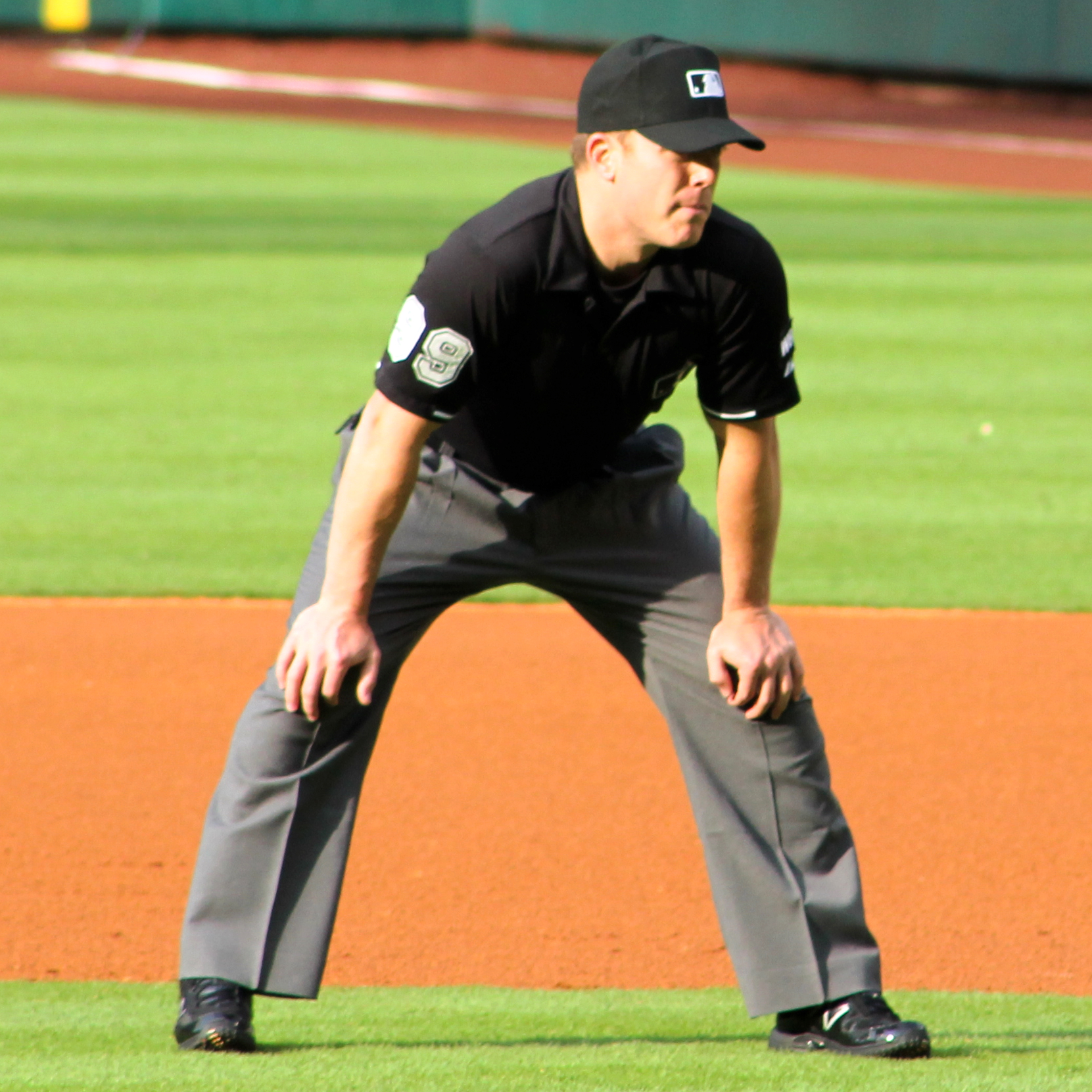
- Basner in 2014
- Born: July 29, 1984 (age 41); Bowling Green, Ohio, U.S.

debut
- June 24, 2012

Career highlights and awards
- Special Assignments: World Baseball Classic Qualifiers (2012)

Toby David Basner (born July 29, 1984) is an American professional baseball umpire. He umpired his first Major League Baseball (MLB) game on June 24, 2012.

== Early life and career ==
Basner was born on July 29, 1984, in Bowling Green, Ohio. He graduated from Brookwood High School in Georgia. He had been umpiring baseball games since the age of 12. He attended the Harry Wendelstedt Umpire School at the age of 19, where he was identified as an umpiring prospect by a professional evaluation course. He reported to the rookie-level Gulf Coast League. He spent several seasons in the lower minor leagues. He worked his first full season in Triple-A in 2010.

Basner debuted in the major leagues on June 24, 2012. Through the end of the 2016 season, Basner has umpired 323 MLB games, and has issued 11 ejections.

=== Notable games ===
During a game between the Toronto Blue Jays and Minnesota Twins on May 21, 2016, Toronto third baseman and reigning American League MVP Josh Donaldson made a comment towards the Minnesota dugout after a first-inning groundout. Basner, thinking Donaldson was addressing him, ejected him from the game, a game Toronto would go on to lose. Basner's wife later bragged about the incident on social media, referring to her husband as a "boss"; she closed all of her social media accounts soon after. Crew chief Joe West referred to the incident as "the funniest darn ejection I’ve ever seen."

== Personal life ==
Basner's father, Alan, is an umpire at the high school and college levels.

== See also ==
- List of Major League Baseball umpires (disambiguation)
