= Ron Barnes (umpire) =

American baseball umpire (born 1958)

- Born: December 27, 1958 (age 66); Albany, California, U.S.
- Occupation: Former MLB umpire

Ronald Ellis Barnes (born December 27, 1958) is an American former professional baseball umpire. He served as a reserve umpire in the National League from 1990 to 1997 and in both major leagues from 2001 to 2002.

== Early career ==
Barnes umpired in the Northwest League, the California League and the Texas League before being promoted to the Pacific Coast League. In 1988, Barnes was one of several umpires (including Pam Postema) who received major league tryouts. He was not promoted, but began filling in at the major league level in 1990.

== MLB career ==
=== Notable games ===
On August 20, 1990, Barnes called Lenny Dykstra out on strikes. Dykstra accused catcher Rick Dempsey of brown-nosing Barnes. In response, Dempsey struck Dykstra and a bench-clearing fight ensued.

=== Lawsuit ===
In 2000, Barnes filed a $20 million age discrimination lawsuit against Major League Baseball. He alleged that the MLB passed him over for promotions, instead boosting younger umpires with inferior evaluations. At age 39, Barnes was snubbed in favor of five umpires between the ages of 28 and 35 and ultimately lost his job in the Pacific Coast League. In addition to the monetary award, the suit also sought reinstatement of that position. As part of the settlement of that suit, Barnes returned to the Pacific Coast League in 2001 and was again designated a major league replacement umpire.

== Later career ==
In 2005, Barnes began umpiring in the Golden Baseball League. He assumed the role of Umpire-in-Chief for the league in 2008. In this position, he also coordinated umpire development in the Arizona Winter League.

== See also ==
- List of Major League Baseball umpires (disambiguation)
