= Virgil Blueitt =

American baseball player

- Third baseman / Umpire
- Born: March 18, 1896; Bowling Green, Kentucky, U.S.
- Died: April 29, 1952 (aged 56); Chicago, Illinois, U.S.

Negro league baseball debut
- 1916, for the Leland Giants

Last appearance
- 1916, for the Leland Giants

Teams
- Leland Giants (1916)

Virgil Finley Blueitt (March 18, 1896 – April 29, 1952) was an American Negro league third baseman and umpire.

A native of Bowling Green, Kentucky, Blueitt played for the Leland Giants in 1916. By 1937, he was umpiring in the Negro American League, and continued through at least the 1949 season. He died in Chicago, Illinois in 1952 at age 56.
