= Dave Aschwege =

American baseball umpire and executive

- Born: David Paul Aschwege; May 21, 1969 (age 56); Vienna, Virginia, U.S.
- Occupation: Umpire

David Paul Aschwege (born May 21, 1969) is an American former Major League Baseball (MLB) umpire and an executive for the Lincoln Saltdogs minor league baseball team. After umpiring in the minor leagues for several years, he served as a substitute umpire in MLB during 2003 and 2004. Aschwege joined the Lincoln front office after leaving minor league umpiring in 2007.

== Career ==
Aschwege umpired in the minor leagues for thirteen seasons in the 1990s and 2000s, including eight years at the Triple-A level. In 2001, Aschwege was promoted to be a crew chief in the Pacific Coast League. He was used as an MLB substitute umpire in 2003 and 2004, umpiring a total of 47 games in the major leagues. After his minor league umpiring career ended, Aschwege became a ticket account executive with the Lincoln Saltdogs in 2007. He became the team's director of stadium operations the following season.

== See also ==
- List of Major League Baseball umpires (disambiguation)
