= David Astor Dowdy Jr. =

American sculptor (1933–2019)

David Astor Dowdy Jr. (March 9, 1933 – April 24, 2019) was an American businessman who in later life became a sculptor.

== Early life and education ==
Dowdy attended High Point Public Schools and Oak Ridge Military Institute before entering pharmacy school. After obtaining a B.S. in Pharmacy from the University of North Carolina in 1954, Dowdy served in the United States Navy. Upon discharge in 1956, he entered the business world.

== Sculpture ==
For most of his life, Dowdy sculpted primarily as a hobby, rendering portrait work of men, women, children, and historical and religious figures at the request of friends and business associates. Most of his commissions are privately owned, but a number are on public display, including Albert Schweitzer (1966) at the Duke University Medical Center Eye Center, John Wesley (1990) at the First United Methodist Church of High Point, Dr. James A, Johnson (1991) at the High Point Regional Hospital, George Watts Hill (1993) Alumni Center, University of North Carolina at Chapel Hill, Hargrove 'Skipper' Bowles (1993) in the Thurston – Bowles Building, University of North Carolina at Chapel Hill, and Senator Jesse Helms at the Helms Center in Wingate, North Carolina. One of his works is a three-part, life-size bronze on display outside the BellSouth state headquarters in Charlotte, North Carolina. This piece consists of a life-size statue of Alexander Graham Bell observing a lineman pulling fiber-optic cable around the globe, and is entitled "Bringing the World Together". His latest major work is the "Plank Road Foreman" at the Depot in High Point.

== Personal life and death ==
In later life, Dowdy developed Parkinson's disease. He died at home on April 24, 2019, at the age of 86.
