= Nancy M. Dowdy =

American physicist

Nancy M. O'Fallon Dowdy is an American nuclear physicist who was instrumental in nuclear disarmament negotiations between the U.S. and the Soviet Union after the Cold War. She received her doctorate in physics in 1966. After she developed her career as a nuclear physicist, she turned to politics, where she served as a representative of the United States on a commission for arms control. In 1992 she was nominated by Pres. George H. W. Bush to be Special Representative for Arms Control Negotiation and Disarmament in the aftermath of the Cold War. She has been designated a Fellow of the American Physical Society, in recognition of her role on treaty verification, her research accomplishments and leadership in research, and leadership and service on behalf of women in physics.

== Education ==
Dowdy received her B.S. in electrical engineering from St. Louis University in 1960. She then received her M.S. in nuclear engineering from University of Illinois, Urbana-Champaign in 1961, where she stayed to earn her doctorate in physics in 1966.

== Career ==
Upon finishing her graduate studies, she was appointed a teaching position at the University of Missouri-St. Louis as an assistant professor of physics in 1967. From 1974 to 1976 she was an assistant physicist at Argonne National Laboratory. In 1976 she was promoted to physicist at Argonne, where she worked until 1983, when she was appointed to be the assistant vice president for research at the University of Chicago In 1989 she turned to politics, becoming a representative to the Strategic Arms Reduction Treaties delegation for the Arms Control and Disarmament Agency for three years. She was also the chief science advisor at the Arms Control and Disarmament Agency. Starting in 1991, she was also a representative to the Joint Compliance and Inspection Commission in Geneva. From 1992 to 1993 she was the special representative for arms control and disarmament negotiations, a position for which she was nominated by President George H.W. Bush. In 1993 she returned to industry and joined Battelle-Pacific Northwest Laboratory as senior program manager. She retired in 1995 and runs a national security consulting service with her husband under the name Dowdy Associates.

She was a William C. Foster Fellow for the United States Arms Control and Disarmament Agency from 1987–1989. In 1992, she received the Superior Honor Award from the Arms Control and Disarmament Agency. The next year, she was awarded the Meritorious Honor Award, also from the U.S. Arms Control and Disarmament Agency. In 1996 she was appointed a fellow of the American Physical Society.

== Publications ==
Dowdy has collaborated on several journal articles throughout her career. In one article entitled "Instrumentation and Monitoring" written by Bernard R. Cooper and William A. Ellingson, she "provided leadership in development of synthetic fuels instrumentation".

== See also ==
- United Nations Office for Disarmament Affairs
- Agency for the Prohibition of Nuclear Weapons in Latin America and the Caribbean
- Comprehensive Test Ban Treaty
- International Court of Justice advisory opinion on legality of nuclear weapons
- Nuclear Non-Proliferation Treaty
- Nuclear weapons and the United States
- Strategic Arms Limitation Talks
