= César Valdés =

Cuban basketball player

Personal information
- Born: 26 April 1942 (age 82); San Juan y Martínez, Republic of Cuba

Sport
- Sport: Basketball

César Valdés (born 26 April 1942) is a Cuban basketball player. He competed in the men's tournament at the 1968 Summer Olympics.
