= Kevin Causey =

American baseball umpire (born 1978)

- Born: August 13, 1978 (age 46); Little Rock, Arkansas, U.S.
- Occupation: Former MLB umpire
- Height: 6 ft 3 in (191 cm)

Kevin Michael Causey (born August 13, 1978) is an American former Major League Baseball umpire. He made his first Major League umpiring appearance on September 2, 2006, and his last on September 13, 2009. He officiated in a total of 81 games in his Major League career. Causey had two ejections during this stint, both coming in August 2008. He ejected Jay Payton and Jim Leyland over calls on the bases.

== See also ==
- List of Major League Baseball umpires (disambiguation)
