= Dusty Dellinger =

American baseball umpire (born 1973)

Duston "Dusty" Dellinger
- Born: April 4, 1973 (age 52); Charlotte, North Carolina, U.S.
- Occupation(s): Director, Minor League Baseball
- Height: 6 ft 0 in (183 cm)

Duston "Dusty" Eugene Dellinger (born April 4, 1973) is an American former Major League Baseball umpire. He made his first Major League umpiring appearance on July 4, 2005, and his last on June 3, 2007. Currently, he serves as the Director of Minor League Baseball Umpire Development and the Minor League Baseball Umpire Training Academy.

== Umpiring career ==
Prior to joining Minor League Baseball Umpire Development, Dellinger umpired in the New York–Penn League (1997), South Atlantic League (1998), Carolina League (1999), Southern League (2000–02), International League (2003–07), and Arizona Fall League (2003-04). He also umpired in the Major League Baseball (2004–07) and the Puerto Rican Winter League (2002, 2006) and was selected to umpire in the first World Baseball Classic in 2006.

=== Notable games ===
Dellinger was the first base umpire in a September 2, 2006, game between the Seattle Mariners and Tampa Bay Devil Rays. This game was notable for one of the great rarities in baseball, a triple play without the batter touching the ball. With runners on first and third, Mariner Raúl Ibañez was called out on strikes. The runner on first tried to steal and was thrown out by catcher Dioner Navarro. Then the runner on third broke for home and was thrown out at the plate by shortstop Ben Zobrist. It was the first 2-6-2 triple play in baseball history.

=== Education ===
Dellinger holds a Bachelor of Arts degree from Catawba College.
