= Angel Campos =

American baseball umpire (born 1973)

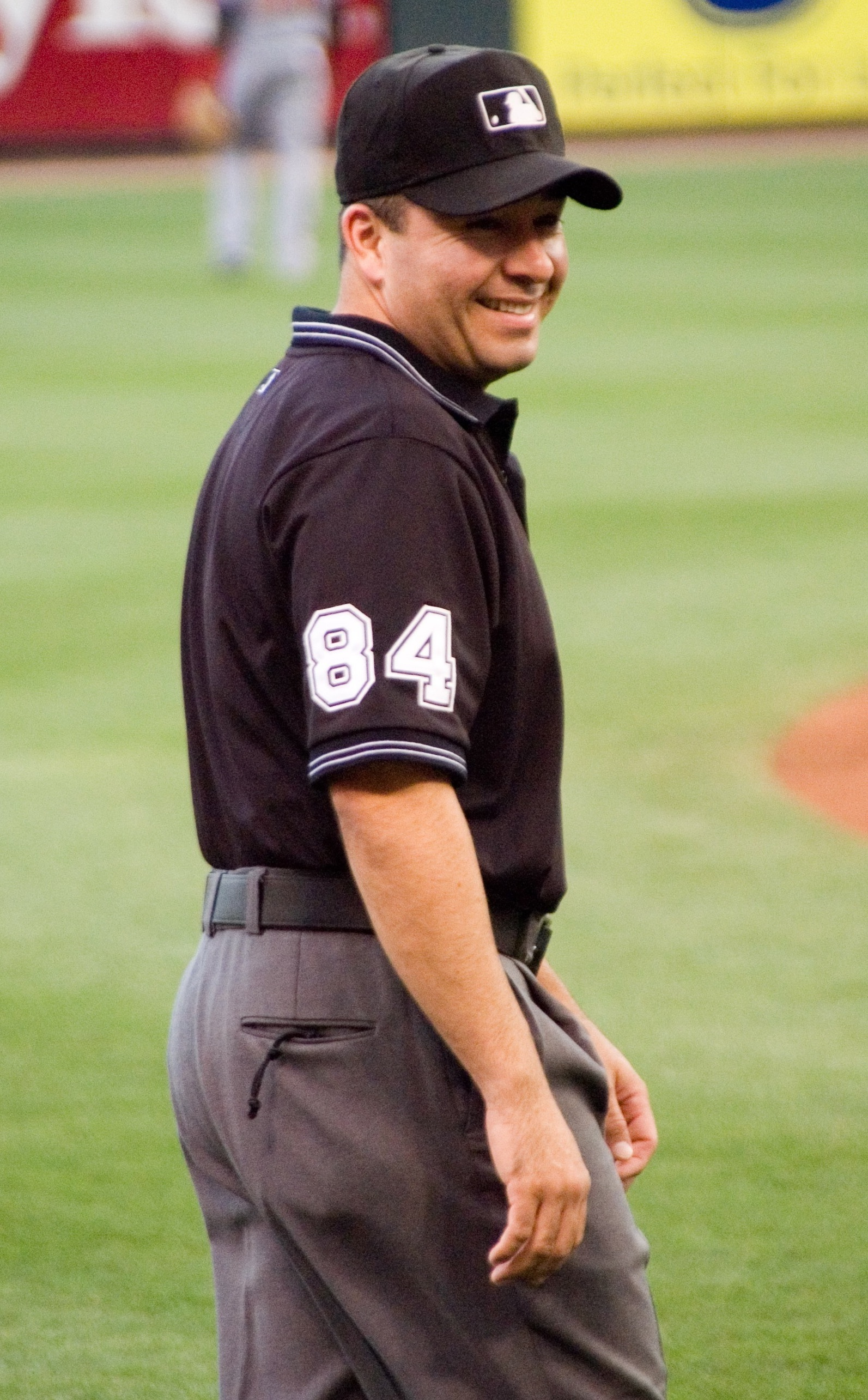
- Campos in 2009
- Born: August 22, 1973 (age 51); Montclair, California, U.S.
- Occupation: NCAA Division I Baseball Umpire & Former MLB umpire
- Height: 5 ft 9 in (175 cm)

Angel Hernandez Campos (born August 22, 1973) is an American baseball umpire who umpired in Major League Baseball (MLB) from 2007 to 2014 and has also umpired in college baseball.

== Umpiring career ==
Angel Campos began his professional umpiring career in the minor leagues in 2000. He umpired his first MLB game on May 3, 2007. He last umpired in MLB on September 14, 2014.

=== Incidents and notable games ===
In May 2011, Campos ejected Kansas City Royals catcher Matt Treanor from a game against the St. Louis Cardinals. Although the two were exchanging words, Treanor was not facing Campos at the time he was thrown out. Royals manager Ned Yost, who was also ejected, later said, "Nobody in the park knew that they were arguing. Nobody. And to eject the guy under those circumstances isn't right."

In August 2012, Campos ejected Los Angeles Dodgers outfielder Matt Kemp, who was in the dugout, in the second inning of a game against the Pittsburgh Pirates. Dodgers players admitted to arguing with Campos concerning the strike zone earlier. After a called strike from Pirates pitcher A. J. Burnett was contested, Campos said that he had had enough but moments later, Kemp yelled to teammate Andre Ethier "let's go, Dre," and was ejected by Campos. Los Angeles manager Don Mattingly was subsequently ejected by first base umpire Tim Tschida, and Campos ejected Dodger starting pitcher Joe Blanton in the fifth inning.

Campos was the second base umpire when San Francisco Giants pitcher Jonathan Sánchez no-hit the San Diego Padres on July 10, 2009.

Campos was also at second base on June 13, 2012, when Giants pitcher Matt Cain threw a perfect game against the Houston Astros.

Campos was also roundly criticized for ejecting Clemson’s Cam Canarella in the 13th inning of a 2023 NCAA super regional game between Clemson and Tennessee for words from Canarella to a Tennessee player on his way to the dugout. "You cannot do that," said ESPN broadcaster Kyle Peterson. "There's zero, zero way you can throw a kid out for doing that. Either one of them. I don't know what was said, but they were going the other way, guys. We're not face-to-face. We're not imitating anything. They are fired up, running off the field. This has got to stop."

Campos was the home plate umpire for Game 2 of the 2025 College World Series. He ejected Coastal Carolina head coach Kevin Schnall for arguing balls and strikes in violation of NCAA rules in the first inning. Campos also ejected first base coach Matt Schilling, who had also previously been warned, 3 minutes later. This followed first base umpire Casey Moser tripping during a confrontation with Schnall, though Schnall denied bumping Moser. ESPN reporter Jeff Passan called Schnall's ejection "absurd."

=== Health emergency ===
In September 2010, Campos became ill while a rain delay postponed the start of a regular season game between the Minnesota Twins and Cleveland Indians. He was taken to a Cleveland hospital and underwent an emergency appendectomy.

== See also ==
- List of Major League Baseball umpires (disambiguation)
