= Clint Fagan =

American baseball umpire (born 1981)

- Born: October 21, 1981 (age 44); Houston, Texas, U.S.

debut
- June 27, 2011

Career highlights and awards
- Special Assignments: 2013 World Baseball Classic; 2025 NCAA Division-I College World Series

Clint Michael Fagan (born October 21, 1981) is the coordinator of baseball umpires for the NCAA Southeastern Conference, and is a former Major League Baseball (MLB) and NCAA Division I umpire. He worked in MLB between 2011 and 2017, and wore number 82 on his uniform.

== Career ==
Fagan umpired his first MLB game on June 27, 2011. He worked a total of 90 games during his first three MLB seasons, and worked over 100 games during each of the next three seasons. Fagan umpired a total of 522 major league games.

After his career in professional baseball ended, Fagan umpired college baseball in the Southeastern Conference and the Big XII Conference, and was selected to work the 2025 Division I College World Series. In August 2026, he left his role as an on-field umpire to become the SEC's coordinator of baseball umpires.

== Notable games ==
Fagan was an umpire for the 2012 Triple-A All-Star Game, and for the 2013 World Baseball Classic.

On June 2, 2013, Fagan ejected Yadier Molina of the St. Louis Cardinals after Molina threw his helmet upon being called out at first base by Fagan; Molina became irate, and St. Louis manager Mike Matheny was subsequently ejected by Fagan while arguing. On June 11, 2013, Fagan issued six ejections in a game between the Los Angeles Dodgers and the Arizona Diamondbacks; two due to an intentional hit by pitch, and four due to a brawl.

== Personal life ==
Fagan resides in Georgetown, Texas, with his family; he additionally works as an attorney.

== See also ==
- List of Major League Baseball umpires (disambiguation)
