= Adam Dowdy =

American baseball umpire (born 1975)

- Born: Adam Matthew Dowdy; January 9, 1975 (age 50); Streator, Illinois, U.S.
- Occupation: Umpire
- Years active: 2002-2007
- Employer: Major League Baseball

Adam Matthew Dowdy (born January 9, 1975) is an American former professional baseball umpire. He worked more than 400 games as a Major League Baseball reserve umpire between 2002 and 2007.

== Professional umpiring career ==
Dowdy graduated from the Jim Evans Academy of Professional Umpiring in 1995, where he would return as an instructor from 1996 to 2004. Dowdy worked in Class A baseball from 1995 to 1998, umpiring in the Gulf Coast League, Northwest League, Midwest League and Florida State League. In 1999 and 2000, Dowdy umpired in the Class Double-A Eastern League before a promotion to Triple-A baseball. Dowdy was contracted to the Pacific Coast League 2001-2005 and International League 2006–2008. Dowdy umpired the Florida Instructional League in 2000 and the Arizona Fall League 2001–2003.

== Notable games ==
Dowdy was selected to umpire minor league championships in 1996, 1997, 1998, 2000, and 2008. Dowdy was selected to umpire All-Star Games in 1997, 2000, and 2005. Dowdy was at 3rd base for a no-hitter thrown by Brett Tomko on July 4, 2001, in Oklahoma City (PCL). Dowdy was behind home plate for the first 9-inning perfect game in PCL history on July 7, 2001 (John Halama in Tacoma, Washington). Dowdy umpired his first Major League game working 3rd base on June 18, 2002, in Atlanta (Detroit Tigers v. Atlanta Braves). Dowdy umpired the 2006 World Baseball Classic. Dowdy was umpiring 1st base for Alex Rodriguez's 500th home run on August 4, 2007, at Yankee Stadium.

== After professional baseball ==
Since 2009, Dowdy has umpired college baseball across several athletic conferences, including the Western Athletic Conference, Big 12 Conference and Pac-12 Conference. Dowdy umpired behind home plate in the gold medal game of the 2011 Baseball World Cup in Panama. Dowdy was awarded the 2011 IBAF Umpire of the Year. Dowdy umpired behind home plate for the 2012 WAC championship game in Mesa, Arizona. Dowdy umpired the 2012 NCAA Baseball Championship Regional in Gary, Indiana.

== See also ==
- List of Major League Baseball umpires (disambiguation)
