= 2017 World Baseball Classic Pool A =

First round

Pool A of the first round of the 2017 World Baseball Classic was held at Gocheok Sky Dome, Seoul, South Korea from March 6 to 9, 2017, between Israel and the Netherlands (the top two teams in the pool, who advanced to the next round in Japan) and South Korea and Taiwan. Pool A was a round-robin tournament. Each team played the other three teams once, with the top two teams advancing to Pool E.

Prior to the start of the tournament, ESPN considered Team Israel, ranked 41st in the world, to be the biggest underdog in the tournament, referring to them as the "Jamaican bobsled team of the WBC".

Team Israel (3−0) and Team Netherlands (2−1) qualified for the next round, in Japan. Israel became the first baseball team to go undefeated in the first round of the WBC’s main draw after entering the main draw by winning in a qualifying round. Israel's catcher, Ryan Lavarnway, was named Pool A MVP, after going 5-for-9 (.556/.692/.889), with four walks, a home run, and three RBIs.

== Standings ==
Pos	Team	Pld	W	L	RF	RA	RD	PCT	GB	Qualification
1	Israel	3	3	0	21	10	+11	1.000	—	Advance to second round
2	Netherlands	3	2	1	13	9	+4	.667	1	Advance to second round
3	South Korea (H)	3	1	2	12	15	−3	.333	2	
4	Chinese Taipei	3	0	3	20	32	−12	.000	3	

Rules for classification: Tiebreakers
(H) Hosts

Pool A MVP: (Israel) Ryan Lavarnway

== Results ==
- All times are Korea Standard Time (UTC+09:00).

=== Israel 2, South Korea 1 ===
March 6, 18:30 at Gocheok Sky Dome (F/10)
Team	1	2	3	4	5	6	7	8	9	10	R	H	E
Israel	0	1	0	0	0	0	0	0	0	1	2	8	0
South Korea	0	0	0	0	1	0	0	0	0	0	1	7	0
WP: Josh Zeid (1−0) LP: Chang-yong Lim (0−1); Attendance: 15,470 (92.1%); Umpires: HP − Brian Knight, 1B − Frantisek Pribyl, 2B − Brett Robson, 3B − D. J. Reyburn; Boxscore

In their first game Israel defeated the Pool A favorite South Korea, ranked # 3 in the world, in 10 innings by a score of 2−1. Israel's winning pitcher Josh Zeid said the win was the pinnacle of his career: "This has to be it. This has to be the top, top win as a team, I think in my career. I’ve been lucky enough to be part of a couple of championships in the lower levels in the minor leagues and in high school, but nothing compares to this stage. Israel's third baseman Ty Kelly tweeted: "Definitely the most stressful game I’ve ever been a part of. But it was worth it." Israel's catcher Ryan Lavarnway noted after the win: "two generations ago, the way that this team was put together, would have meant that we were being killed... It means a lot more than that we're here."

=== Israel 15, Chinese Taipei 7 ===
March 7, 12:00 at Gocheok Sky Dome
Team	1	2	3	4	5	6	7	8	9	R	H	E
Israel	4	0	2	0	0	0	5	1	3	15	20	1
Chinese Taipei	0	0	0	0	0	3	0	0	4	7	12	2
WP: Corey Baker (1−0) LP: Chun-lin Kuo (0−1); Home runs: ISR: Ryan Lavarnway (1), Nate Freiman (1); TPE: None; Attendance: 3,287 (19.6%); Umpires: HP − Chikara Tsugawa, 1B − Ted Barrett, 2B − Brian Knight, 3B − Frantisek Pribyl; Boxscore

Against Chinese Taipei, ranked # 4 in the world, Israel won again, this time by the score of 15−7. Israel's 15 runs were the most Taiwan had ever given up in a game in World Baseball Classic play. Taiwan manager Kuo Tai-yuan said of Israel: "That's a very scary team."

=== Netherlands 5, South Korea 0 ===
March 7, 18:30 at Gocheok Sky Dome
Team	1	2	3	4	5	6	7	8	9	R	H	E
South Korea	0	0	0	0	0	0	0	0	0	0	6	1
Netherlands	2	1	0	0	0	2	0	0	X	5	11	0
WP: Rick VandenHurk (1−0) LP: Kyu-min Woo (0−1); Home runs: KOR: None; NED: Jurickson Profar (1), Randolph Oduber (1); Attendance: 15,184 (90.4%); Umpires: HP − D. J. Reyburn, 1B − Brian Knight, 2B − Brett Robson, 3B − Frantisek Pribyl; Boxscore

The Netherlands shut out South Korea, 5−0, handing the host team its second loss and raising the prospect of South Korea's second early exit since 2013 World Baseball Classic.

=== Netherlands 6, Chinese Taipei 5 ===
March 8, 18:30 at Gocheok Sky Dome
Team	1	2	3	4	5	6	7	8	9	R	H	E
Chinese Taipei	0	0	2	0	3	0	0	0	0	5	10	1
Netherlands	0	1	0	3	0	0	0	1	1	6	13	0
WP: Shairon Martis (1−0) LP: Hung-wen Chen (0−1); Home runs: TPE: Chih-hao Chang (1); NED: None; Attendance: 3,606 (21.5%); Umpires: HP − Ted Barrett, 1B − Brett Robson, 2B − D. J. Reyburn, 3B − Chikara Tsugawa; Notes: No outs when winning run scored. Boxscore

The Netherlands defeated Chinese Taipei in the ninth inning with a walk-off walk, keeping Taipei from advancing to the next round since the 2013 World Baseball Classic.

=== Israel 4, Netherlands 2 ===
March 9, 12:00 at Gocheok Sky Dome
Team	1	2	3	4	5	6	7	8	9	R	H	E
Netherlands	0	0	1	0	0	0	0	1	0	2	5	1
Israel	3	0	0	0	0	1	0	0	X	4	8	2
WP: Jason Marquis (1−0) LP: Rob Cordemans (0−1) Sv: Josh Zeid (1); Attendance: 2,739 (16.3%); Umpires: HP − Brian Knight, 1B − Chikara Tsugawa, 2B − Ted Barrett, 3B − Frantisek Pribyl; Boxscore

Israel beat the Netherlands, ranked # 9 in the world and including a number of prominent Major Leaguers, 4−2 as Israeli relief pitcher Josh Zeid got the save. In what NBC reported was thought to be the tallest batter-pitcher matchup in baseball history, the Dutch team’s 7-foot-1-inch (2.16 m) pitcher Loek van Mil walked Israel's 6-foot-8-inch (2.03 m) first baseman Nate Freiman.

=== South Korea 11, Chinese Taipei 8 ===
March 9, 18:30 at Gocheok Sky Dome (F/10)
Team	1	2	3	4	5	6	7	8	9	10	R	H	E
South Korea	1	5	0	2	0	0	0	0	0	3	11	18	0
Chinese Taipei	0	3	0	2	0	2	1	0	0	0	8	13	1
WP: Seung-hwan Oh (1−0) LP: Hung-wen Chen (0−2); Home runs: KOR: Tae-kyun Kim (1); TPE: Che-hsuan Lin (1); Attendance: 12,000 (71.4%); Umpires: HP − D. J. Reyburn, 1B − Ted Barrett, 2B − Brett Robson, 3B − Chikara Tsugawa; Boxscore

South Korea took third place in the pool, as it beat Taiwan in 10 innings, 11−8. Taiwan, which came in last in the pool, will now need to play qualification games in order to qualify for the next WBC tournament.
