= 2009 World Baseball Classic Pool D =

Pool D of the First Round of the 2009 World Baseball Classic was held at Hiram Bithorn Stadium, San Juan, Puerto Rico from March 7 to 11, 2009.

Pool D was a modified double-elimination tournament. The winners for the first games matched up in the second game, while the losers faced each other in an elimination game. The winners of the elimination game then played the losers of the non-elimination game in another elimination game. The remaining two teams then played each other to determine seeding for the Pool 2.

== Bracket ==
Preliminaries
–	Netherlands	3
–	Dominican Rep.	2
–	Panama	0
–	Puerto Rico	7
Lower round 1
L1	Dominican Rep.	9
L2	Panama	0

Qualifiers
W1	Netherlands	1
W2	Puerto Rico	3
Lower final
W3	Dominican Rep.	1
L4	Netherlands	2

Seeding
W4	Puerto Rico	5
W5	Netherlands	0

== Results ==
- All times are Atlantic Standard Time (UTC−04:00).

=== Netherlands 3, Dominican Republic 2 ===
March 7 12:00 at Hiram Bithorn Stadium
Team	1	2	3	4	5	6	7	8	9	R	H	E
Netherlands	3	0	0	0	0	0	0	0	0	3	3	0
Dominican Republic	0	0	0	1	1	0	0	0	0	2	8	3
WP: Sidney Ponson (1−0) LP: Edinson Vólquez (0−1) Sv: Leon Boyd (1); Home runs: NED: None; DOM: Miguel Tejada (1); Attendance: 9,335 (51.9%); Umpires: HP − Larry Vanover, 1B − Corrie Davis, 2B − Eric Cooper, 3B − Stephan Dupont; Boxscore

=== Puerto Rico 7, Panama 0 ===
March 7 18:00 at Hiram Bithorn Stadium
Team	1	2	3	4	5	6	7	8	9	R	H	E
Panama	0	0	0	0	0	0	0	0	0	0	5	2
Puerto Rico	0	1	0	1	1	1	3	0	X	7	13	0
WP: Javier Vázquez (1−0) LP: Bruce Chen (0−1); Home runs: PAN: None; PUR: Carlos Delgado (1), Iván Rodríguez 2 (2); Attendance: 17,348 (96.4%); Umpires: HP − Laz Díaz, 1B − Stephan Dupont, 2B − Eric Cooper, 3B − Luis Ramírez; Boxscore

=== Dominican Republic 9, Panama 0 ===
March 8 16:30 at Hiram Bithorn Stadium
Team	1	2	3	4	5	6	7	8	9	R	H	E
Panama	0	0	0	0	0	0	0	0	0	0	6	2
Dominican Republic	0	0	3	2	0	1	0	3	X	9	8	0
WP: Johnny Cueto (1−0) LP: Ramiro Mendoza (0−1); Home runs: PAN: None; DOM: Miguel Olivo 2 (2), Nelson Cruz (1); Attendance: 9,221 (51.2%); Umpires: HP − Eric Cooper, 1B − Luis Ramírez, 2B − Larry Vanover, 3B − Corrie Davis; Boxscore

=== Puerto Rico 3, Netherlands 1 ===
March 9 18:30 at Hiram Bithorn Stadium
Team	1	2	3	4	5	6	7	8	9	R	H	E
Netherlands	0	1	0	0	0	0	0	0	0	1	5	1
Puerto Rico	0	0	0	0	0	0	0	3	X	3	8	0
WP: J. C. Romero (1−0) LP: Dennis Neuman (0−1) Sv: Fernando Cabrera (1); Attendance: 19,479 (108.2%); Umpires: HP − Larry Vanover, 1B − Corrie Davis, 2B − Laz Díaz, 3B − Stephan Dupont; Boxscore

=== Netherlands 2, Dominican Republic 1 ===
March 10 18:30 at Hiram Bithorn Stadium
Team	1	2	3	4	5	6	7	8	9	10	11	R	H	E
Dominican Republic	0	0	0	0	0	0	0	0	0	0	1	1	7	3
Netherlands	0	0	0	0	0	0	0	0	0	0	2	2	5	1
WP: Leon Boyd (1−0) LP: Carlos Mármol (0−1); Attendance: 11,814 (65.6%); Umpires: HP − Laz Díaz, 1B − Stephan Dupont, 2B − Larry Vanover, 3B − Luis Ramírez; Notes: Two outs when winning run scored. Boxscore

=== Puerto Rico 5, Netherlands 0 ===
March 11 17:30 at Hiram Bithorn Stadium
Team	1	2	3	4	5	6	7	8	9	R	H	E
Netherlands	0	0	0	0	0	0	0	0	0	0	6	0
Puerto Rico	1	0	0	0	2	1	0	1	X	5	10	0
WP: Jonathan Sánchez (1−0) LP: Pim Walsma (0−1); Attendance: 19,501 (108.3%); Umpires: HP − Eric Cooper, 1B − Luis Ramírez, 2B − Laz Díaz, 3B − Corrie Davis; Boxscore
