= Time in the Netherlands =

Time in the Kingdom of the Netherlands
- Time zone: Central European Time (Netherlands); Atlantic Standard Time (Caribbean Netherlands)
- UTC offset: UTC+01:00 (Netherlands); UTC−04:00 (Caribbean Netherlands)
- Time notation: 24-hour clock

Daylight saving time
- Name: Central European Summer Time (Netherlands)
- Initials: CEST
- UTC offset: UTC+02:00
- Start: Last Sunday in March (02:00 CET)
- End: Last Sunday in October (03:00 CEST)

tz database
- Europe/Amsterdam; America/Kralendijk

Time in the Kingdom of the Netherlands is denoted by Central European Time (CET; Midden-Europese Tijd) during the winter as standard time in the Netherlands, which is one hour ahead of coordinated universal time (UTC+01:00), and Central European Summer Time (CEST) during the summer as daylight saving time, which is two hours ahead of coordinated universal time (UTC+02:00). The Caribbean Netherlands – which consist of the islands of Bonaire, Sint Eustatius and Saba – all observe Atlantic Standard Time (AST) year-round, which is four hours behind coordinated universal time (UTC−04:00).

== History ==
=== Early history ===
Christiaan Huygens, who was Dutch, invented the revolutionary pendulum clock

Before the 19th century, there was no need for a standard time zone across the country. Instead, sundials were historically used to measure the mean solar time. But they could not function at night or if the sky was cloudy, in which case other methods such as the clepsydra were used, which measured time by the regulated flow of water into or out from a vessel. Sundials, which divide a day into 24 hours, were subject to inaccuracies, as Earth's rotation around the Sun does not follow a uniform time of 24 hours. On a sundial, the position of the sun would be 14 minutes behind around 11 February, and 16½ minutes ahead around 3 November. From the 13th century, mechanical clocks began to be used across Europe. However, they too remained imprecise, and had to be adjusted almost daily on the basis of the position of the Sun with a sundial in order to remain accurate. In 1656, Christiaan Huygens invented the pendulum clock, a clock that uses a pendulum swinging weight as its timekeeping element. It was immensely accurate, misaligning only about one second per year, and soon became the world's standard timekeeper until it was superseded as a time standard by the quartz clock in the 1930s.

=== Advent of the railway and telegraph ===
In the mid-19th century, the need for a standard time zone across the country began to be realised with the advent of the railway, which would follow precise timetables – sailing ships and stage-coaches could not – and with the telegraph, which allowed near real-time communication.

While a mean time was proposed as early as 1835, the first law relating to a standardised time zone was the Telegraph Act of 1852, which stipulated that the national telegraph service adjust the clocks in its offices to "the central time of Amsterdam", which would later become known as "Amsterdam Time" (Dutch: Amsterdamse Tijd) the mean time of Amsterdam (UTC+00:19:32.13). Later amendments to the Telegraph Act allowed telegraph offices to indicate their opening hours in local mean time, but Amsterdam Time always had to be stated when the telegrams were sent. From 1 January 1866, both the opening hours and the times stated on the telegrams had to be given in both local time and Amsterdam Time.

According to the General Regulations for Railway Services Act, passed on 12 May 1863, each station had to be "provided with a well-running clock, regulated according to the mean time after which the service on the railway takes place", the choice of the maintained time being left to the railway companies themselves. Most railway stations chose to observe Amsterdam Time, and in a government decree dated 31 July 1866 to amend the railway regulations, it was stipulated that the time at all stations and in all timetables should henceforth be given according to Amsterdam Time.

The International Meridian Conference was held in Washington, D.C. in October 1884, which was attended by a delegate from the Netherlands. Geographically, the Netherlands is located closer to the prime meridian in Greenwich Mean Time (GMT; UTC+00:00; also called Western European Time) than to the 15th meridian east in Central European Time (CET; UTC+01:00). However, a government decree dated 19 April 1892 proclaimed that from 1 May the Dutch railways would legally be required to observe GMT whilst the telegraph companies would have to observe CET. The latter decision came as to convenience shipping between the Netherlands and the rest of continental Europe, where the bordering countries observed CET. The ship's chronometers were also adjusted accordingly.

=== Nationwide standard times and the introduction of daylight saving time ===
On 1 May 1909, a government decree stipulated that the entirety of the Netherlands (including the Dutch railways) would be required by law to observe Amsterdam Time.

Daylight saving time was first introduced on 1 May 1916; the clock moved forwards one hour at 00:00 to UTC+01:19:32.13, and moved back on 1 October at 00:00. Daylight saving time continued the following year, this time moving forwards on 16 April at 02:00 and back on 17 September at 03:00. The government found the results pleasing, and formally implemented daylight saving time into law on 23 March 1918. Between 1918 and 1925 (Note: Except for the years 1923 and 1925, when daylight saving time began on the first Friday in June.) daylight saving time began on the first Monday in April at 02:00 and ended on the last Monday in September at 03:00 until 1921, when the end date was changed to the Sunday in the first weekend of October. Between 1926 and 1939, daylight saving time began on 15 May – one week later if it fell on Whitsun – at 02:00, and ended at 03:00 at Sunday in the first weekend of October.

On 1 July 1937, the time zone of the Netherlands was simplified to UTC+00:20, and became generally known as "Dutch Time" (Dutch: Nederlandse Tijd).

In 1940 when Germany occupied the Netherlands in World War II, Berlin Time (UTC+01:00) was adopted. During the German occupation daylight saving was observed following the first and last dates as observed in Germany.

The Netherlands has retained UTC+01:00 ever since, today known as Central European Time (CET; Dutch: Midden-Europese Tijd (MET)).

== Daylight saving time ==
In-line with the EU directive, the Netherlands observes daylight saving time yearly by advancing the clock forward one hour from Central European Time in UTC+01:00 to Central European Summer Time in UTC+02:00 at 02:00 on the last Sunday in March and back at 03:00 on the last Sunday in October.

== Geography and solar time ==
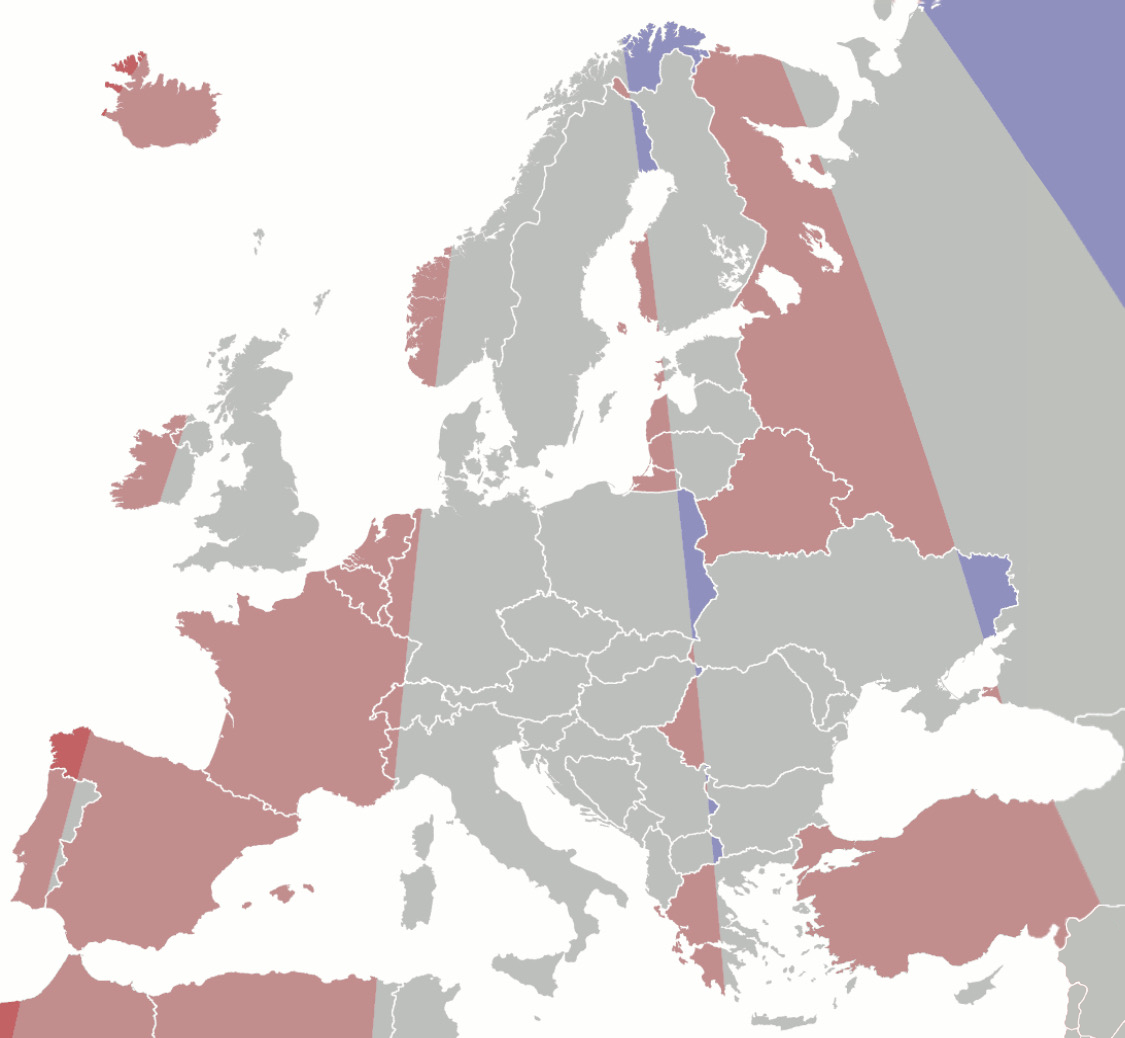
Map of Europe with differences between time zones and UTC offsets, showing the Netherlands 0 h ± 30 m 1 h ± 30 m ahead

Geographically, the Netherlands lies within the UTC+00:00 offset. The difference of longitude between the western (3°21′30″E) and easternmost points (7°13′40″E) of the Netherlands results in a difference of approximately 16 minutes of solar time.

== IANA time zone database ==
In the IANA time zone database, the Netherlands is given two zones in the file zone.tab – Europe/Amsterdam and America/Kralendijk for the Caribbean Netherlands. (Note: Kralendijk, the capital of Bonaire, is the largest city in the Caribbean Netherlands.) "NL" and "BQ" refer to the country's ISO 3166-1 alpha-2 country codes, the latter being for the Caribbean Netherlands and the former for the country in general. Data for the Netherlands directly from zone.tab of the IANA time zone database; columns marked with * are the columns from zone.tab itself:

c.c.*	coordinates*	TZ*	Comments	UTC offset	DST
NL	+5222+00454	Europe/Amsterdam		+01:00	+02:00
BQ	+120903−0681636	America/Kralendijk		−04:00	−04:00

Computers which do not support "Europe/Amsterdam" or "America/Kralendijk" may use the POSIX syntax: TZ="CET-1CEST,M3.5.0,M10.5.0/3" or TZ="AST4" respectively.

== See also ==
- Time in Europe
- List of time zones by country
- List of time zones by UTC offset
- UTC+00:20
