= Netherlands national baseball team =

Information
- Country: Kingdom of the Netherlands
- Federation: Royal Netherlands Baseball and Softball Federation
- Confederation: WBSC Europe
- Manager: (Curaçao) Andruw Jones (WBC) (Netherlands) Evert-Jan 't Hoen (WBSC)
- Captain: (Aruba) Xander Bogaerts

WBSC ranking
- Current: 11 (26 October 2026)
- Highest: 5 (December 2014)
- Lowest: 10

Uniforms

Olympic Games
- Appearances: 4 (first in 1996)
- Best result: 5th (2 times, most recent in 2000)

World Baseball Classic
- Appearances: 5 (first in 2006)
- Best result: 4th (2013, 2017)

World Cup
- Appearances: 17 (first in 1970)
- Best result: (gold) 1st (1 time, in 2011)

Intercontinental Cup
- Appearances: 5 (first in 1983)
- Best result: (silver) 2nd (2 times, most recent in 2010)

European Championship
- Appearances: 35 (first in 1956)
- Best result: (gold) 1st (25 times, most recent in 2025)

The Netherlands national baseball team (Dutch: Nederlands honkbalteam), also known as "Kingdom of the Netherlands" and "Team Oranje", is the national baseball team of the Kingdom of the Netherlands, representing the country in international men's baseball. They are the most successful team in Europe, consistently ranked in the top 10 globally by the World Baseball Softball Confederation (WBSC). The team is governed by the Royal Netherlands Baseball and Softball Federation, which is a member of WBSC Europe.

The Netherlands participated in four Summer Olympic Games from 1996 to 2008. The team has also participated in other major international baseball tournaments, including the World Baseball Classic (WBC), Baseball World Cup, and WBSC Premier12. The Netherlands' best finish was winning the 2011 World Cup, defeating 25-time champion Cuba in the finals. More recently, the Dutch finished fourth in the 2013 and 2017 WBC.

The team is made up primarily of players from Dutch territories and islands in the Caribbean that are part of the Kingdom of the Netherlands. Baseball is popular in Aruba and Curaçao, which were part of the former Netherlands Antilles. Some players from the Netherlands in Europe and foreign-born players of Dutch descent from the United States and Canada have also been members of the team. The Dutch team has won 25 European Baseball Championships and finished second six times, with its worst result in the competition placing third in 2023.

== History ==
=== Early history ===
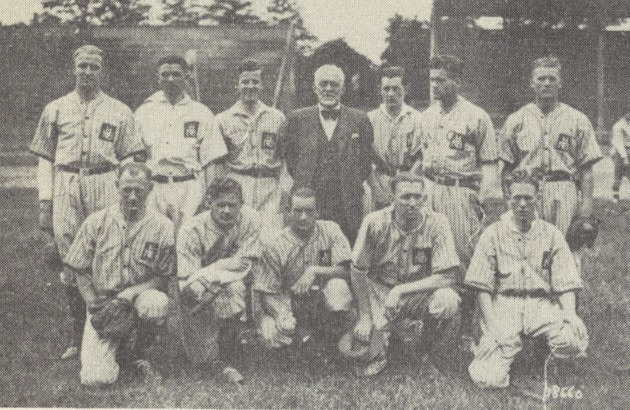
The Dutch national baseball team in 1937

The Netherlands national team played its first international game on August 26, 1934 in Heemstede; the Dutch side lost to Belgium by a score of 21–12. In a rematch later that summer, the Netherlands notched its first-ever win, defeating Belgium 19–17 in Antwerp. The Dutch won an early international baseball tournament over France and a team from Hawaii in Paris in 1937. Throughout the 1930s, the Netherlands would play regular games against Belgium and France, accumulating a record of 7–2 against the two opponents between 1937 and 1939, and emerging as the strongest European baseball power. The Netherlands was one of the 12 inaugural members of the International Baseball Federation in 1938.

Joining the European Baseball Federation in 1955, the Netherlands won the 1956 European Baseball Championship. From that point on, they won all 10 continental championship they entered through 1973, not losing a game until 1971. Also in 1956, the Dutch appeared at the 1956 Global World Series held at Milwaukee County Stadium in the United States. They lost both games they played, against Puerto Rico (14–2) and Colombia (7–1). Nevertheless, the Dutch team continued to dominate at the European championships, thanks to the pitching of Han Urbanus, the first Dutch player to be scouted by a Major League Baseball team. (He reportedly declined a contract with the New York Giants.) The Dutch team also won a three-team tournament over Spain and Belgium in September 1957 commemorating the opening of Camp Nou in Barcelona.

The Dutch national team began including players from the Netherlands Antilles, the Dutch colonial possessions in the Caribbean, in the 1960s and 1970s, even though the Netherlands Antilles maintained its own national team at the time. This practice was maintained despite complaints from Italy. The Dutch federation defended its players of Caribbean ancestry as "possessing the nationality 100%". The Italians dropped their complaint allowing Caribbean-born players to make up an integral part of its squad. Both the Dutch and Italians also began using American-born players with European heritage in international tournaments.

The Dutch team has also regularly had managers from the United States. Ron Fraser, who later coached the Miami Hurricanes, managed the team in parts of the 1960s and 1970s. Jim Stoeckel, later the Davidson Wildcats coach, also managed the team, as did Pat Murphy, who later managed the Milwaukee Brewers. In the World Baseball Classic era, the team has primarily been managed by former Dutch team players, including Hensley Meulens, Evert-Jan 't Hoen, and Andruw Jones, though Americans Davey Johnson and Rod Delmonico also helmed the team.

=== World Baseball Classic ===
The Netherlands has competed in each edition of the World Baseball Classic (WBC), the top international baseball tournament. The team has twice finished fourth.

==== 2006 ====
Prior to the 2006 WBC, the Netherlands played four exhibition games in Florida. They beat Eckerd College twice in February, then lost to the University of Tampa college team and an Atlanta Braves spring training squad. Andruw Jones competed against his MLB team in the final exhibition.

The Netherlands competed in Pool C, along with reigning world champion Cuba, Panama, and Puerto Rico, in the first round at the Hiram Bithorn Stadium in San Juan, Puerto Rico.

After losing to Cuba and Puerto Rico in their round-robin pool games, they finished third in their pool and were eliminated along with Panama. Shairon Martis threw a 7-inning no-hitter against Panama.

==== 2009 ====
Prior to the 2009 WBC, the Netherlands played seven exhibition games, including games against the Pittsburgh Pirates, Cincinnati Reds, and Minnesota Twins. The Netherlands team lost all three games against these MLB opponents.

The Netherlands competed in Pool D, along with 2006 WBC semi-finalist Dominican Republic, Panama, and Puerto Rico, in the first round, again at Hiram Bithorn Stadium in Puerto Rico. The team won both games against the strong Dominican Republic team. As result, the team made it through the first double-elimination round along with Puerto Rico. In the second round, the Dutch lost to Venezuela then the United States. The Dutch finished seventh in the competition.

==== 2013 ====
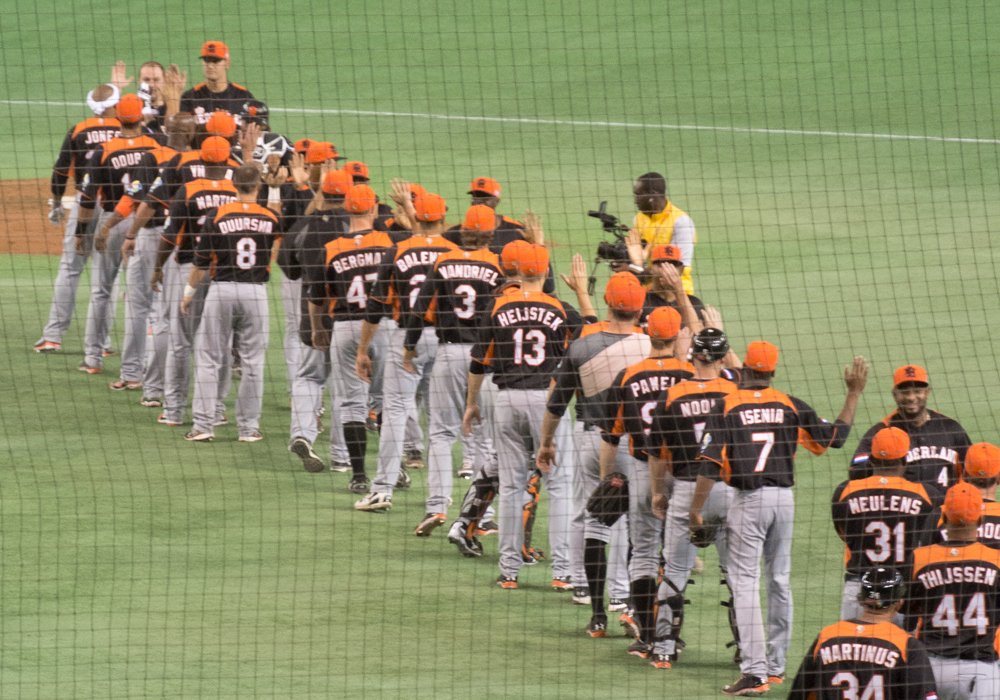
Netherlands at the 2013 WBC

The Netherlands competed in Pool B against Chinese Taipei, South Korea, and Australia at Taichung Intercontinental Baseball Stadium in Taichung, Taiwan. The Dutch team won their first game against South Korea 5–0, but lost to Chinese Taipei 8–3. However, the Netherlands defeated Australia 4–1, thus securing a position for the second round in the Tokyo Dome to face off against Japan and Cuba.

The Dutch team defeated Cuba 6–2 before facing two-time defending champion Japan, suffering a 16–4 loss stopped after 7 innings due to the mercy rule. This forced a rematch with Cuba. The Dutch narrowly beat Cuba 7–6 to advance to the championship round, then lost a seeding match, again falling to Japan, 10–6. They faced the Dominican Republic in the semi-finals, losing 4–1. The Netherlands finished fourth in the tournament.

==== 2017 ====
The Netherlands, ranked ninth in the world, included major league stars, many of whom were raised in islands in the Caribbean that are part of the Kingdom of the Netherlands. The players included All-Star shortstop Xander Bogaerts (from Aruba), 20-home-run hitter shortstop Didi Gregorius (born in the Netherlands and raised in Curaçao), 20-home-run hitter second baseman Jonathan Schoop (born in Curaçao), Gold Glove shortstop Andrelton Simmons (born in Curaçao), and infielder/outfielder Jurickson Profar (born in Curaçao). Sports Illustrated wrote that the Dutch team "boasts arguably the most talented infield in the entire tournament."

In the first round, the Netherlands lost to Israel, 4–2. In what NBC reported was thought to be the tallest batter-pitcher matchup in baseball history, the Dutch team's 7-foot-1-inch (2.16 m) pitcher Loek van Mil walked Israel's 6-foot-8-inch (2.03 m) first baseman Nate Freiman. The Dutch then beat South Korea (5–0) and Taiwan (6–5). Along with Israel, which finished first in the pool, the Netherlands qualified for the next round in Japan.

In the second round, an extra innings loss against Japan was followed by two mercy rule wins over Israel and Cuba. Together with Japan, which had finished top of the pool, the Netherlands advanced to the championship round. All-Star closer Kenley Jansen joined the Dutch team for the championship round.

The Netherlands semifinal match against Puerto Rico ended in a loss with an 11th inning walk-off sacrifice fly by Eddie Rosario. The final score was 4–3. Outfielder Wladimir Balentien was chosen in the All-WBC team after leading the tournament in hits, home runs, and RBI.

==== 2023 ====
After two runs to the prior WBC semi-finals, the Netherlands failed to advance past the first round in 2023. All five teams in its pool finished with a 2–2 record, but Cuba and Italy advanced on tiebreakers while the Dutch, Chinese Taipei, and Panama were eliminated.

==== 2026 ====
The Netherlands finished fourth in Pool D of the 2026 WBC on March 6–11, 2026, at LoanDepot Park in Miami, Florida. Ozzie Albies hit a walk-off home run to defeat Nicaragua, but the team lost to Israel, the Dominican Republic, and eventual champions Venezuela.

Hall of Famer Andruw Jones managed the team, which included All-Stars Ozzie Albies, Bogaerts, Gregorius, and Jansen as well as Gold Glove center fielder Ceddanne Rafaela. Several former team members could not participate, with Profar suspended by MLB for failing a performance-enhancing substance test and Schoop recently arrested in Curaçao on suspicion of possession of prohibited firearms.

== Results and fixtures ==
The following is a list of professional baseball match results currently active in the latest version of the WBSC World Rankings, as well as any future matches that have been scheduled.

Legend

Win Lose Void or postponed Fixture

=== 2019 ===
Euro Championship GS	September 8	Netherlands	6–8	Czech Republic	Bonn 1, Germany
Euro Championship GS	15:30 CET	LP: Tom de Blok (0–1); HR: Calten Daal (1)	Boxscore	WP: Marek Minarik (1–0); Sv: Martin Schneider (1); HR: Martin Cervenka (1)	Attendance: 1,200; Umpires: HP – Taurelli, 1B – Arevalo, 3B – Jankovic

Euro Championship GS	September 9	Netherlands	9–0	Sweden	Bonn 1, Germany
Euro Championship GS	15:00 CET	WP: Donny Breek (1–0); HR: Roger Bernadina (1), Curt Smith (1), Sharlon Schoop (1)	Boxscore	LP: Jakob Claessen (0–1)	Attendance: 300; Umpires: HP – Meyer, 1B – Kroupa, 3B – Tscharf

Euro Championship GS	September 10	Netherlands	8–1	Germany	Bonn 1, Germany
Euro Championship GS	19:00 CET	WP: Lars Huijer (1–0); HR: Ademar Rifaela (3)	Boxscore	LP: Daniel Thieben (0–1)	Attendance: 1,100; Umpires: HP – Fabrizi, 1B – Taurelli, 3B – Arevalo

Euro Championship GS	September 11	Israel	4–13	Netherlands	Bonn 1, Germany
Euro Championship GS	15:00 CET	LP: Shlomo Lipetz (0–1); HR: Daniel Valencia (1)	Boxscore	WP: Tom Stuifbergen (1–0); HR: Ademar Rifaela (2), Hendrik Clementina (1), Kalian Sams (1)	Attendance: 250; Umpires: HP – Waider, 1B – Ozimec, 3B – Tscharf

Euro Championship GS	September 11	Great Britain	2–10	Netherlands	Solingen, Germany
Euro Championship GS	17:00 CET	LP: Ethan Solomon (0–1)	Boxscore	WP: Orlando Yntema (1–0); Sv: Shairon Martis (1)	Attendance: 150; Umpires: HP – Waider, 1B – Tscharf, 3B – Ozimec

Euro Championship QF	September 13	Netherlands	17–2 (F/5)	Belgium	Bonn 1, Germany
Euro Championship QF	15:00 CET	WP: Orlando Yntema (2–0); HR: Hendrik Clementina (2), Calten Daal (1), Roger Bernadina (1), Curt Smith (1), Ademar Rifaela (1), Dashenko Ricardo (1), Kalian Sams (1)	Boxscore	LP: Artuur Driessens (0–2)	Attendance: 350; Umpires: HP – Makouchetchev, 1B – Roloff, 3B – Kroupa

Euro Championship SF	September 14	Netherlands	1–0	Spain	Bonn 1, Germany
Euro Championship SF	15:00 CET	WP: Tom de Blok (1–1); Sv: J. C. Sulbaran (1)	Boxscore	LP: Lowuin Sacramento (1–1)	Attendance: 350; Umpires: HP – Fabrizi, 1B – Jankovic, 2B – Waider, 3B – Jones

Euro Championship F	September 15	Italy	1–5	Netherlands	Bonn 1, Germany
Euro Championship F	19:00 CET	LP: Luis Lugo (1–1); HR: Alberto Mineo (1)	Boxscore	LP: Kevin Kelly (1–0); HR: Kalian Sams (3), John Polonius (1)	Attendance: 2,000; Umpires: HP – Waider, 1B – Kroupa, 2B – Makouchetchev

WBSC Premier12 GS	November 2	Netherlands	0–9	United States	Estadio Panamericano, Mexico
WBSC Premier12 GS	12:00 CT	LP: Rob Cordemans (0–1)	Boxscore	WP: Cody Ponce (1–0); HR: Drew Waters (1), Jordon Adell (1), Robert Dalbec (1), Brent Rooker (1)	Attendance: 3,015; Umpires: HP – Maikol Tibabijo, 1B – Ki Joong Lee, 2B – Aaron Roberts, 3B – Hsu-Kuang Chu

WBSC Premier12 GS	November 3	Dominican Republic	14–4 (F/7)	Netherlands	Estadio Panamericano, Mexico
WBSC Premier12 GS	12:00 CT	WP: Henry Henry (1–0); HR: Carlos Peguero (1), Charlie Valerio (1), Jeison Guzman (1)	Boxscore	LP: Orlando Yntema (0–1); HR: Roger Bernadina (1), Chadwick Tromp (1)	Attendance: 5,132; Umpires: HP – Ruben Ramos, 1B – Jeff Macias, 2B – Hsu-Kuang Chu, 3B – Ki Joong Lee

WBSC Premier12 GS	November 5	Netherlands	2–10	Mexico	Estadio Panamericano, Mexico
WBSC Premier12 GS	19:00 CT	LP: Tom Stuifbergen (0–1)	Boxscore	WP: Manuel Barreda (1–0)	Attendance: 6,895; Umpires: HP – Aaron Roberts, 1B – Jeff Macias, 2B – Maikol Tibabijo, 3B – Tomo Yamaguchi

=== 2021 ===
Euro Championship GS	September 12	Slovakia	0–11 (F/7)	Netherlands	Paschetto Stadium, Italy
Euro Championship GS	15:30 CET	LP: Marko Vykoukal (0–1)	Boxscore	WP: Mike Bolsenbroek (1–0)	Attendance: 60; Umpires: HP – Cuauhtemoc Suarez, 1B – Alessandro Spera, 3B – Jiri Kroupa

Euro Championship GS	September 13	Netherlands	11–1	Czech Republic	Paolo II Palace, Italy
Euro Championship GS	20:30 CET	WP: Kevin Kelly (1–0); HR: Ray-Patrick Didder (1)	Boxscore	LP: Marek Minařík (0–1); HR: Matěj Hejma (1)	Attendance: 85; Umpires: HP – Oswald Tscharf, 1B – Marco Taurelli, 3B – Cuauhtemoc Suarez

Euro Championship GS	September 14	Sweden	5–15 (F/8)	Netherlands	Aluffi Stadium, Italy
Euro Championship GS	15:00 CET	LP: Erik Marqvardsen (0–1)	Boxscore	WP: Jayden Gonesh (1–0); HR: Ray-Patrick Didder (1), Dashenko Ricardo (1), John Polonius (1)	Attendance: 85; Umpires: HP – Oswald Tscharf, 1B – Tomislav Ozimec, 3B – Christopher Feuerecker

Euro Championship QF	September 16	Netherlands	7–5	Great Britain	Paschetto Stadium, Italy
Euro Championship QF	20:30 CET	WP: Lars Huijer (1–0); Sv: Wendell Floranus (1)	Boxscore	LP: Daniel Cooper (0–1)	Attendance: 132; Umpires: HP – Mojmír Jankovič, 1B – Marco Taurelli, 3B – Christopher Feuerecker

Euro Championship SF	September 17	Spain	8–9	Netherlands	Paolo II Palace, Italy
Euro Championship SF	15:00 CET	LP: Carlos Sierra (0–1); HR: Edison Valerio (1), Lesther Galvan (1)	Boxscore	WP: Kevin Kelly (2–0); Sv: Wendell Floranus (2); HR: Dashenko Ricardo (1)	Attendance: 220; Umpires: HP – Marco Taurelli, 1B – Mojmír Jankovič, 3B – Jens Waider

Euro Championship F	September 19	Israel	4–9	Netherlands	Paschetto Stadium, Italy
Euro Championship F	20:30 CET	LP: Charles Rossman (0–1); HR: Assaf Lowengart (1)	Boxscore	WP: Mike Groen (1–0); Sv: Wendell Floranus (3); HR: Roger Bernadina (1), Dashenko Ricardo (1)	Attendance: 570; Umpires: HP – Alessandro Spera, 1B – Mojmír Jankovič, 2B – Jens Waider, 3B – Serge Makouchetchev

=== 2022 ===
Haarlem Week GS	July 8	Italy	1–2	Netherlands	Mulier Stadium, Netherlands
Haarlem Week GS	19:30 CET	LP: Christian Paul Scafidi (0–1)	Boxscore	WP: Lars Huijer (1–0); Sv: Kevin Kelly (1)	Umpires: HP – Marco Taurelli, 1B – Aad Otsen, 2B – Roy Van de Wateringen, 3B – Jeffrey Bentsnijder

Haarlem Week GS	July 9	Netherlands	5–1	Cuba	Mulier Stadium, Netherlands
Haarlem Week GS	19:30 CET	WP: Mike Groen (1–0); HR: Roger Bernadina (1)	Boxscore	LP: Yoel Machado Mojena (0–1)	Umpires: HP – Edwin Louisa, 1B – Niek Elshof, 2B – Marek Vičar, 3B – John Beltman

Haarlem Week GS	July 10	Curaçao	8–6	Netherlands	Mulier Stadium, Netherlands
Haarlem Week GS	15:30 CET	WP: Témesh Lourens (1–0); Sv: Risandro Pastor (1)	Boxscore	LP: Shairon Martis (0–1)	Umpires: HP – Niek Elshof, 1B – Marek Vičar, 2B – John Beltman, 3B – Edwin Louisa

Haarlem Week GS	July 12	Netherlands	0–10 (F/6)	United States	Mulier Stadium, Netherlands
Haarlem Week GS	19:30 CET	LP: Ryan Huntington (0–1)	Boxscore	WP: Carson Montgomery (1–0); Sv: Wyatt Crowell (1); HR: Jacob Gonzalez (1)	Umpires: HP – Marco Taurelli, 1B – Aad Otsen, 2B – Jeffrey Bentsnijder, 3B – Roy Van de Wateringen

Haarlem Week GS	July 13	Netherlands	0–5	Japan	Mulier Stadium, Netherlands
Haarlem Week GS	19:30 CET	LP: Chris Stuart (0–1)	Boxscore	WP: Shota Watanabe (1–0)	Umpires: HP – John Beltman, 1B – Marek Vičar, 2B – Edwin Louisa, 3B – Niek Elshof

Haarlem Week SF	July 14	Netherlands	2–1	Japan	Mulier Stadium, Netherlands
Haarlem Week SF	19:30 CET	WP: Lars Huijer (2–0)	Boxscore	LP: Minato Aoyama (1–1)	Umpires: HP – Edwin Louisa, 1B – John Beltman, 2B – Jeffrey Bentsnijder, 3B – Marek Vičar

Haarlem Week F	July 15	Curaçao	1–6	Netherlands	Mulier Stadium, Netherlands
Haarlem Week F	19:00 CET	LP: Ruderly Manuel (0–2)	Boxscore	WP: Shairon Martis (1–1)	Umpires: HP – Edwin Louisa, 1B – Aad Otsen, 2B – Roy Van de Wateringen, 3B – John Beltman

=== 2023 ===
World Baseball Classic GS	March 8	Cuba	2–4	Netherlands	Taichung Stadium, Taiwan
World Baseball Classic GS	12:00 NST	LP: Onelki García (0–1)	Boxscore	WP: Eric Méndez (1–0); Sv: Wendell Floranus (1)	Attendance: 6,501; Umpires: HP – Nic Lentz, 1B – Shoji Arisumi, 2B – Dan Iassogna, 3B – Serge Makouchetev

World Baseball Classic GS	March 9	Panama	1–3	Netherlands	Taichung Stadium, Taiwan
World Baseball Classic GS	12:00 NST	LP: Jaime Barría (0–1)	Boxscore	WP: Shairon Martis (1–0); Sv: Wendell Floranus (2); HR: Xander Bogaerts (1), Jurickson Profar (1)	Attendance: 6,048; Umpires: HP – Larry Vanover, 1B – Roberto Ortiz, 2B – Trent Thomas, 3B – Shōji Arisumi.

World Baseball Classic GS	March 11	Netherlands	5–9	Chinese Taipei	Taichung Stadium, Taiwan
World Baseball Classic GS	19:00 NST	LP: Lars Huijer (0–1); HR: Ray-Patrick Didder (1)	Boxscore	WP: Huang Tzu-peng (1–0); Sv: Chia-Hao Sung (2); HR: Yu Chang (2)	Attendance: 18,826; Umpires: HP – Mark Carlson, 1B – Ki Talk Park, 2B – Dan Iassogna, 3B – Serge Makouchetev

World Baseball Classic GS	March 12	Netherlands	1–7	Italy	Taichung Stadium, Taiwan
World Baseball Classic GS	19:00 NST	LP: Mike Bolsenbroek (0–1); HR: Chadwick Tromp (1)	Boxscore	WP: Matt Harvey (1–0)	Attendance: 4,985; Umpires: HP – Roberto Ortiz, 1B – Dan Iassogna, 2B – Serge Makouchetev, 3B – Trent Thomas

Euro Championship GS	September 24	France	0–9	Netherlands	MBS Stadium, Brno
Euro Championship GS	17:30 CEST	LP: Antoine Nicolas (0–1)	Boxscore	WP: Shairon Martis (1–0); HR: Sicnarf Loopstok (1)	Attendance: 210; Umpires: HP – David Kulhanek, 1B – Jean-Paul Jacobs, 3B – Andreas Danielzick

Euro Championship GS	September 25	Netherlands	16–3	Ukraine	MBS Stadium, Brno
Euro Championship GS	11:00 CEST	WP: Aaron de Groot (1–0); HR: Roger Bernadina (1), Ray-Patrick Didder (1), Juremi Profar (1), Ademar Rifaela (1)	Boxscore	LP: Mykyta Liabakh (0–1)	Attendance: 250; Umpires: HP – Andreas Danielzick, 1B – Gabor Erdos Jacobs, 3B – Alessandro SPERA

Euro Championship GS	September 26	Croatia	2–15 (F/7)	Netherlands	MBS Stadium, Brno
Euro Championship GS	17:30 CEST	LP: Justin Olic (0–1); HR: Antonio Horvatić (1)	Boxscore	WP: J. C. Sulbaran (1–0); HR: Ray-Patrick Didder (1)	Attendance: 197; Umpires: HP – Andreas Danielzick, 1B – Jean-Paul Jacobs, 3B – David Kulhanek

Euro Championship QF	September 28	Israel	2–12 (F/8)	Netherlands	MBS Stadium, Brno
Euro Championship QF	17:30 CEST	LP: Alex Katz (0–1)	Boxscore	WP: Lars Huijer (1–0)	Attendance: 490; Umpires: HP – Christopher Feuerecker, 1B – Sergii Bolilyi, 3B – Gabor Erdos

Euro Championship SF	September 29	Spain	7–6	Netherlands	MBS Stadium, Brno
Euro Championship SF	17:30 CEST	WP: Rhiner Cruz (1–0)	Boxscore	LP: Wendell Floranus (0–1); HR: Juremi Profar (1), Sicnarf Loopstok (1)	Attendance: 400; Umpires: HP – Alessandro Spera, 1B – Christopher Feuereckers, 2B – Mojmír Jankovič, 3B – Jiri Kroupa

Euro Championship Bronze	October 1	Germany	2–15 (F/10)	Netherlands	MBS Stadium, Brno
Euro Championship Bronze	17:30 CEST	LP: Mark Harrison (0–1); HR: Shawn Larry (1)	Boxscore	WP: Kevin Kelly (1–0); HR: Dashenko Ricardo (2), Juremi Profar (1)	Attendance: 978; Umpires: HP – Miroslav Kaigl, 1B – Gabor Erdos, 2B – Alessandro Spera, 3B – Fabien Carrette-Legrand

=== 2024 ===
WBSC Premier12 GS	9 November	Panama	8–9	Netherlands	Estadio Panamericano, Mexico
WBSC Premier12 GS	13:00	LP: Alberto Baldonado (0–1); HR: Ruben Tejada (1), José Ramos (1)	Boxscore	WP: J. C. Sulbaran (1–0); HR: Sharlon Schoop (1), Denzel Richardson (1)	Attendance: 347; Umpires: HP – Kelvin Bultron, 1B – Shane Vincent Cannon, 2B – Omar Peralta, 3B – Ramiro Alfaro

WBSC Premier12 GS	10 November	Netherlands	2–12	United States	Santa Teresita Stadium, Mexico
WBSC Premier12 GS	16:00	LP: Kaj Timmermans (0–1); HR: Matt Shaw (1), Luke Ritter (1), Ryan Ward (1)	Boxscore	WP: Antonio Menendez (1-0); HR: Didi Gregorius (1)	Attendance: 5,133; Umpires: HP – Tim Martin Meyer, 1B – Hideto Fuke, 2B – Kengo Iwashita, 3B – Alan Izaguirre

WBSC Premier12 GS	12 November	Netherlands	20–8 (F/7)	Puerto Rico	Estadio Panamericano, Mexico
WBSC Premier12 GS	20:00	WP: Tom de Blok (1–0); HR: Hendrik Clementina (2), Didi Gregorius (1), Sharlon Schoop (1)	Boxscore	LP: Agnel Miranda (1–0); HR: Ezequiel Pagan (1),John Montes (1)	Attendance: 622; Umpires: HP – Gye Sung Lee, 1B – Omar Peralta, 2B – Shane Vincent Cannon, 3B – Keith McConkey

WBSC Premier12 GS	13 November	Mexico	8–6	Netherlands	Estadio Panamericano, Mexico
WBSC Premier12 GS	20:00	WP: Jesus Cruz (1–0); Sv: R. J. Alaniz (2); HR: Juan Perez (1)	Boxscore	LP: Eric Mendez (0–1); HR: Denzel Richardson (1), Ray-Patrick Didder (1), Dwayne Kemp (1)	Attendance: 2,257; Umpires: HP – Omar Peralta, 1B – Gye Sung Lee, 2B – Kelvin Bultron, 3B – Shane Vincent Cannon

WBSC Premier12 GS	14 November	Netherlands	0–11 (F/7)	Venezuela	Estadio Panamericano, Mexico
WBSC Premier12 GS	13:00	LP: Shairon Martis (0–1)	Boxscore	WP: Ricardo Pinto (1–0); HR: Hernán Pérez (1), Herlis Rodriguez (1), Ehire Adrianza (1)	Attendance: 239; Umpires: HP – Shane Vincent Cannon, 1B – Ramiro Alfaro, 2B – Omar Peralta, 3B – Kelvin Bultron

=== 2025 ===
Friendly	March 5	Netherlands	0–5	Japan	Kyocera Dome, Japan
Friendly	19:00 JT	LP: Kevin Kelly (0–1)	Boxscore	WP: Hiroya Miyagi (1–0); HR: Shun Mizutani (1)	Attendance: 28,618

Friendly	March 6	Netherlands	0–9	Japan	Kyocera Dome, Japan
Friendly	18:30 JT	LP: Koen Postelmans (0–1)	Boxscore	WP: Ryosuke Otsu (1–0); HR: Yusuke Oyama (1)	Attendance: 21,747

Euro Championship GS	September 20	Netherlands	9–3	Great Britain	Neptunus Familiestadion, Rotterdam
Euro Championship GS	20:30 CEST	WP: Lars Huijer (1–0); Sv: Kevin Kelly (1); HR: Didi Gregorius (1), Jonathan Schoop (1), Hendrik Clementina (1), Sharlon Schoop (1), Eugene Helder (1)	Boxscore	LP: Ryan Long (0–1)	Attendance: 3,000; Umpires: HP – Tim Martin Meyer, 1B – Cesar Quintana, 3B – Alessandro Spera

Euro Championship GS	September 21	Netherlands	13–4	France	Neptunus Familiestadion, Rotterdam
Euro Championship GS	15:00 CEST	WP: Shairon Martis (1–0)	Boxscore	LP: Gédéon Coste (0–1)	Attendance: 3,000; Umpires: HP – Jiri Kroupa, 1B – Alessandro Spera, 3B – Tim Martin Meyer

Euro Championship GS	September 22	Israel	1–9	Netherlands	Neptunus Familiestadion, Rotterdam
Euro Championship GS	19:30 CEST	LP: Jake Fishman (0–1)	Boxscore	WP: Scott Prins (1–0); HR: Juremi Profar (1)	Attendance: 820; Umpires: HP – Jason Lillebo, 1B – Tim Martin Meyer, 3B – Jiri Kroupa

Euro Championship QF	September 25	Croatia	1–3	Netherlands	Neptunus Familiestadion, Rotterdam
Euro Championship QF	19:30 CEST	LP: Frank Plesac (0–1)	Boxscore	WP: Lars Huijer (2–0); Sv: Kevin Kelly (2); HR: Delano Selassa (1)	Attendance: 1,450; Umpires: HP – Tim Martin Meyer, 1B – Cesar Quintana, 3B – Marek Vičar

Euro Championship SF	September 26	Spain	1–6	Netherlands	Neptunus Familiestadion, Rotterdam
Euro Championship SF	19:30 CEST	LP: José Gómez Bolívar (0–1)	Boxscore	WP: Kevin Kelly (1–0); HR: Jonathan Schoop (1), Ray-Patrick Didder (1), Jiandido Tromp (1)	Attendance: 2,463; Umpires: HP – Mojmír Jankovič, 1B – Filip Havlik, 2B – Nathan Polis, 3B – Alessandro Spera

Euro Championship Final	September 27	Italy	5–6	Netherlands	Neptunus Familiestadion, Rotterdam
Euro Championship Final	19:30 CEST	LP: Fandino Hidalgo-Javier Jose (0–1); HR: Giaconino Lasaracina (1)	Boxscore	WP: Shairon Martis (2–0); Sv: Jaydenn Estanista (1); HR: Sharlon Schoop (1)	Attendance: 3,000; Umpires: HP – Kevin Music, 1B – v, 2B – Nathan Polis, 3B – Cesar Quintana

=== 2026 ===
World Baseball Classic GS	March 6	Netherlands	2–6	Venezuela	loanDepot Park, United States
World Baseball Classic GS	12:00 EST	LP: Antwone Kelly (0-1)	Boxscore	WP: Ranger Suárez (1-0); HR: Javier Sanoja (1)	Attendance: 19,542; Umpires: HP – Shane Livensparger, 1B – Michael Ulloa, 2B – Gabe Morales, 3B – Trent Thomas

World Baseball Classic GS	7 March	Nicaragua	3–4	Netherlands	LoanDepot Park, Miami, United States
World Baseball Classic GS	12:00 UTC−5	LP: Ángel Obando (0-1); HR: Jeter Downs (1)	Boxscore	WP: Lars Huijer (1-0); HR: Ozzie Albies (1)	Attendance: 16,897; Umpires: HP – Trent Thomas, 1B – Quinn Wolcott, 2B – Shane Livensparger, 3B – Alejandro Percero

World Baseball Classic GS	March 8	Netherlands	1–12 (F/7)	Dominican Republic	LoanDepot Park, Miami, United States
World Baseball Classic GS	12:00 EDT	LP: Arij Fransen (0-1)	Boxscore	WP: Luis Severino (1-0); HR: Vladimir Guerrero Jr. (1), Junior Caminero (2), Austin Wells (1), Juan Soto (1)	Attendance: 32,324; Umpires: HP – Lance Barksdale, 1B – Serge Makouchetchev, 2B – Paul Clemons, 3B – Marek Vicar

World Baseball Classic GS	March 10	Israel	6 – 2	Netherlands	LoanDepot Park, Miami, United States
World Baseball Classic GS	19:00 ET	WP: Josh Mallitz (1-0)	Boxscore	LP: Kevin Kelly (0-1)	Attendance: 13,565; Umpires: HP – Shane Livensparger, 1B – Quinn Wolcott, 2B – Marek Vicar, 3B – Michael Ulloa

== Current roster ==
2026 World Baseball Classic roster
Players		Coaching staff
Pitchers: 30 Jamdrick Cornelia; 32 Jaydenn Estanista; 99 Wendell Floranus; 17 Arij Fransen; 16 Lars Huijer; 74 Kenley Jansen; 58 Antwone Kelly; 34 Jaitoine Kelly; 33 Kevin Kelly; 39 Shairon Martis; 29 Eric Mendez; 52 Ryjeteri Merite; 46 Justin Morales; 35 Shawndrick Oduber; 45 Juan Carlos Sulbaran; 00 Derek West; 20 Dylan Wilson	Catchers: 12 Hendrik Clementina; 14 Chadwick Tromp; Infielders: 1 Ozzie Albies; 2 Xander Bogaerts; 18 Didi Gregorius; 13 Juremi Profar; 15 Sharlon Schoop; Outfielders: 5 Dayson Croes; 11 Ray-Patrick Didder; 4 Druw Jones; 37 Jakey Josepha; 3 Ceddanne Rafaela; 22 Delano Selassa	Manager: 25 Andruw Jones; Coaches: 23 Sharnol Adriana (hitting); 8 Michael Duursma (coach); 26 Bart Hanegraaff (hitting); 9 Evert Jan 't Hoen (bench); 49 Jair Jurrjens (pitching); 36 Sem Kuijper (bullpen catcher); 28 Randolph Oduber (first base); 21 Dashenko Ricardo (bullpen catcher); 19 Hainley Statia (bench); 80 Nick Stuifbergen (pitching); 44 Ben Thijssen (third base)

== Tournament record ==
=== World Baseball Classic ===
The Netherlands has competed in all five World Baseball Classic (WBC) tournaments. All 16 teams that played in the 2006 edition were invited to compete in the second in 2009. The Netherlands was an automatic qualifier for each subsequent tournament, beginning in 2013.

The Netherlands progressed to the second round of competition in 2009, and achieved its highest finish, fourth, in both 2013 and 2017. Unusual for international competition in baseball, the squads selected in the WBC feature active Major League Baseball players in addition to Minor League, Nippon Professional Baseball, and local players. Generally, major league players are unavailable for international tournaments due to their contracts with their respective clubs.

The Netherlands teams in the WBC have featured many major leaguers, including Wladimir Balentien, Roger Bernadina, Xander Bogaerts, Didi Gregorius, Greg Halman, Kenley Jansen, Andruw Jones, Shairon Martis, Sidney Ponson, Jurickson Profar, Jonathan Schoop, Andrelton Simmons, and Randall Simon, most of whom are from Aruba or Curaçao.

World Baseball Classic record							Qualification record			
Year	Round	Position	W	L	RS	RA	W	L	RS	RA
(Puerto Rico) 2006	Group stage	11th	1	2	15	19	No qualifiers held			
(Puerto Rico) (United States) 2009	Quarterfinals	7th	2	4	10	23	No qualifiers held			
(Japan) (Taiwan) (United States) 2013	Fourth place	4th	4	4	36	47	Automatically qualified			
(Japan) (South Korea) (United States) 2017	Fourth place	4th	4	3	48	24	Automatically qualified			
(Taiwan) 2023	Group stage	10th	2	2	13	19	Automatically qualified			
(United States) 2026	Group stage	16th	1	3	9	27	Automatically qualified			
Total	Semifinals	6/6	14	18	131	159	—	—	—	—

World Baseball Classic record by opponent
Opponent	Tournaments met	W-L record	Largest victory		Largest defeat		Current streak
Opponent	Tournaments met	W-L record	Score	Tournament	Score	Tournament	Current streak
Australia	1	1–0	4–1	2013	–		W1
Chinese Taipei	3	1–2	6–5	2017	3–8	2013	L1
Cuba	4	4–1	14–1 (F/7)	2017	2–11	2006	W4
Dominican Republic	3	2-2	3–2	2009	1-12 (F/7)	2026	L2
Israel	2	1-2	12–2 (F/8)	2017	2-6	2026	L1
Italy	1	0–1	–		1–7	2023	L1
Japan	2	0–3	–		4–16 (F/7)	2013	L3
Nicaragua	1	1-0	4-3	2026	–		W1
Panama	2	2–0	10–0 (F/7)	2006	–		W2
Puerto Rico	3	0–4	–		3–8	2006	L4
South Korea	2	2–0	5–0	2013; 2017	–		W2
United States	1	0–1	–		3–9	2009	L1
Venezuela	2	0-2	–		2-6	2026	L2
Overall	4	11–13	Against CUB		Against JPN		L1
Overall	4	11–13	14–1 (F/7)	2017	4–16 (F/7)	2013	L1

2006 WBC

March 8; 20:30 AST; First Round, Pool C, Game 3	Puerto Rico	8–3	Netherlands	Hiram Bithorn Stadium, Puerto Rico; Attendance: 15,570
March 8; 20:30 AST; First Round, Pool C, Game 3		Boxscore		Hiram Bithorn Stadium, Puerto Rico; Attendance: 15,570

March 9; 20:00 AST; First Round, Pool C, Game 4	Cuba	11–2	Netherlands	Hiram Bithorn Stadium, Puerto Rico; Attendance: 7,657
March 9; 20:00 AST; First Round, Pool C, Game 4		Boxscore		Hiram Bithorn Stadium, Puerto Rico; Attendance: 7,657

March 10; 14:00 AST; First Round, Pool C, Game 5	Netherlands	10–0 (F/7)	Panama	Hiram Bithorn Stadium, Puerto Rico; Attendance: 6,337
March 10; 14:00 AST; First Round, Pool C, Game 5		Boxscore		Hiram Bithorn Stadium, Puerto Rico; Attendance: 6,337

2009 WBC

March 7; 12:00 AST; First Round, Pool D, Game 1	Netherlands	3–2	Dominican Republic	Hiram Bithorn Stadium, Puerto Rico; Attendance: 9,335
March 7; 12:00 AST; First Round, Pool D, Game 1		Boxscore		Hiram Bithorn Stadium, Puerto Rico; Attendance: 9,335

March 9; 18:30 AST; First Round, Pool D, Game 4	Netherlands	1–3	Puerto Rico	Hiram Bithorn Stadium, Puerto Rico; Attendance: 19,479
March 9; 18:30 AST; First Round, Pool D, Game 4		Boxscore		Hiram Bithorn Stadium, Puerto Rico; Attendance: 19,479

March 10; 18:30 AST; First Round, Pool D, Game 5	Dominican Republic	1–2 (F/11)	Netherlands	Hiram Bithorn Stadium, Puerto Rico; Attendance: 11,814
March 10; 18:30 AST; First Round, Pool D, Game 5		Boxscore		Hiram Bithorn Stadium, Puerto Rico; Attendance: 11,814

March 11; 17:30 AST; First Round, Pool D, Game 6	Netherlands	0–5	Puerto Rico	Hiram Bithorn Stadium, Puerto Rico; Attendance: 19,501
March 11; 17:30 AST; First Round, Pool D, Game 6		Boxscore		Hiram Bithorn Stadium, Puerto Rico; Attendance: 19,501

March 14; 13:00 EDT; Second Round, Pool 2, Game 1	Netherlands	1–3	Venezuela	Dolphin Stadium, United States; Attendance: 17,345
March 14; 13:00 EDT; Second Round, Pool 2, Game 1		Boxscore		Dolphin Stadium, United States; Attendance: 17,345

March 15; 19:30 EDT; Second Round, Pool 2, Game 3	Netherlands	3–9	United States	Dolphin Stadium, United States; Attendance: 11,059
March 15; 19:30 EDT; Second Round, Pool 2, Game 3		Boxscore		Dolphin Stadium, United States; Attendance: 11,059

2013 WBC

March 2; 12:30 NST; First Round, Pool B, Game 2	South Korea	0–5	Netherlands	Taichung Intercontinental Baseball Stadium, Taiwan; Attendance: 1,085
March 2; 12:30 NST; First Round, Pool B, Game 2		Boxscore		Taichung Intercontinental Baseball Stadium, Taiwan; Attendance: 1,085

March 3; 14:30 NST; First Round, Pool B, Game 3	Netherlands	3–8	Chinese Taipei	Taichung Intercontinental Baseball Stadium, Taiwan; Attendance: 22,689
March 3; 14:30 NST; First Round, Pool B, Game 3		Boxscore		Taichung Intercontinental Baseball Stadium, Taiwan; Attendance: 22,689

March 5; 12:30 NST; First Round, Pool B, Game 5	Australia	1–4	Netherlands	Taichung Intercontinental Baseball Stadium, Taiwan; Attendance: 1,113
March 5; 12:30 NST; First Round, Pool B, Game 5		Boxscore		Taichung Intercontinental Baseball Stadium, Taiwan; Attendance: 1,113

March 8; 12:00 JST; Second Round, Pool 1, Game 1	Netherlands	6–2	Cuba	Tokyo Dome, Japan; Attendance: 38,588
March 8; 12:00 JST; Second Round, Pool 1, Game 1		Boxscore		Tokyo Dome, Japan; Attendance: 38,588

March 10; 19:00 JST; Second Round, Pool 1, Game 4	Japan	16–4 (F/7)	Netherlands	Tokyo Dome, Japan; Attendance: 37,745
March 10; 19:00 JST; Second Round, Pool 1, Game 4		Boxscore		Tokyo Dome, Japan; Attendance: 37,745

March 11; 19:00 JST; Second Round, Pool 1, Game 5	Cuba	6–7	Netherlands	Tokyo Dome, Japan; Attendance: 7,613
March 11; 19:00 JST; Second Round, Pool 1, Game 5		Boxscore		Tokyo Dome, Japan; Attendance: 7,613

March 12; 19:00 JST; Second Round, Pool 1, Game 6	Netherlands	6–10	Japan	Tokyo Dome, Japan; Attendance: 30,301
March 12; 19:00 JST; Second Round, Pool 1, Game 6		Boxscore		Tokyo Dome, Japan; Attendance: 30,301

March 18; 18:00 PDT; Championship Round, SF	Netherlands	1–4	Dominican Republic	AT&T Park, United States; Attendance: 27,527
March 18; 18:00 PDT; Championship Round, SF		Boxscore		AT&T Park, United States; Attendance: 27,527

2017 WBC

March 7; 18:30 KST; First Round, Pool A, Game 3	South Korea	0–5	Netherlands	Gocheok Sky Dome, South Korea; Attendance: 15,184
March 7; 18:30 KST; First Round, Pool A, Game 3		Boxscore		Gocheok Sky Dome, South Korea; Attendance: 15,184

March 8; 18:30 KST; First Round, Pool A, Game 4	Chinese Taipei	5–6	Netherlands	Gocheok Sky Dome, South Korea; Attendance: 3,606
March 8; 18:30 KST; First Round, Pool A, Game 4		Boxscore		Gocheok Sky Dome, South Korea; Attendance: 3,606

March 9; 12:00 KST; First Round, Pool A, Game 5	Netherlands	2–4	Israel	Gocheok Sky Dome, South Korea; Attendance: 2,739
March 9; 12:00 KST; First Round, Pool A, Game 5		Boxscore		Gocheok Sky Dome, South Korea; Attendance: 2,739

March 12; 19:00 JST; Second Round, Pool E, Game 2	Japan	8–6 (F/11)	Netherlands	Tokyo Dome, Japan; Attendance: 44,326
March 12; 19:00 JST; Second Round, Pool E, Game 2		Boxscore		Tokyo Dome, Japan; Attendance: 44,326

March 13; 19:00 JST; Second Round, Pool E, Game 3	Netherlands	12–2 (F/8)	Israel	Tokyo Dome, Japan; Attendance: 5,017
March 13; 19:00 JST; Second Round, Pool E, Game 3		Boxscore		Tokyo Dome, Japan; Attendance: 5,017

March 15; 12:00 JST; Second Round, Pool E, Game 5	Netherlands	14–1 (F/7)	Cuba	Tokyo Dome, Japan; Attendance: 40,680
March 15; 12:00 JST; Second Round, Pool E, Game 5		Boxscore		Tokyo Dome, Japan; Attendance: 40,680

March 20; 18:00 PDT; Championship Round, SF	Netherlands	3–4 (F/11)	Puerto Rico	Dodger Stadium, United States; Attendance: 24,865
March 20; 18:00 PDT; Championship Round, SF		Boxscore		Dodger Stadium, United States; Attendance: 24,865

2023 WBC

March 8; 12:00 TST; GS, Pool A, Game 1	Cuba	2–4	Netherlands	Taichung Intercontinental Baseball Stadium, Taiwan; Attendance: 6,501
March 8; 12:00 TST; GS, Pool A, Game 1		Boxscore		Taichung Intercontinental Baseball Stadium, Taiwan; Attendance: 6,501

March 9; 12:00 TST; GS, Pool A, Game 3	Panama	1–3	Netherlands	Taichung Intercontinental Baseball Stadium, Taiwan; Attendance: 6,048
March 9; 12:00 TST; GS, Pool A, Game 3		Boxscore		Taichung Intercontinental Baseball Stadium, Taiwan; Attendance: 6,048

March 11; 19:00 TST; GS, Pool A, Game 8	Netherlands	5–9	Chinese Taipei	Taichung Intercontinental Baseball Stadium, Taiwan; Attendance: 18,826
March 11; 19:00 TST; GS, Pool A, Game 8		Boxscore		Taichung Intercontinental Baseball Stadium, Taiwan; Attendance: 18,826

March 12; 19:00 TST; GS, Pool A, Game 10	Netherlands	1–7	Italy	Taichung Intercontinental Baseball Stadium, Taiwan; Attendance: 4,985
March 12; 19:00 TST; GS, Pool A, Game 10		Boxscore		Taichung Intercontinental Baseball Stadium, Taiwan; Attendance: 4,985

=== Olympic Games ===
Summer Olympics record							Qualification
Year	Round	Position	W	L	RS	RA	Method
(United States) 1984	Did not qualify						1983 European Baseball Championship
(South Korea) 1988	Preliminary	5th (tied) (Note: No medals awarded; baseball was a demonstration sport in 1988)	1	2	11	14	1987 European Baseball Championship
(Spain) 1992	Did not qualify						1991 European Baseball Championship
(United States) 1996	Preliminary	5th	2	5	32	76	1995 European Baseball Championship
(Australia) 2000	Preliminary	5th	3	4	18	30	1999 European Baseball Championship
(Greece) 2004	Preliminary	6th	2	5	29	55	2003 European Baseball Championship
(China) 2008	Preliminary	7th	1	6	9	50	2007 European Baseball Championship
(Japan) 2020	Did not qualify						(silver) Africa/Europe Qualifying Event / (bronze) Final Qualifying Tournament
(United States) 2028							2027 WBSC Premier12 / Qualifying tournament
Total (Note: Totals only include years 1992 to 2008, during which baseball was an official medal sport.)	Preliminary	4/6	11	20	88	211	

The Dutch's best finish in the Summer Olympics is fifth place, which they did in both 1996 and 2000. The first time the Netherlands participated in a baseball tournament at the Olympics was in 1988. Netherlands finished with a 1–2 record, with its only victory coming against Chinese Taipei. There was no official placing, as baseball was a demonstration sport at the 1988 Summer Olympics.

After fifth-place finishes in 1996 and 2000, including an upset victory over Cuba in Sydney, the Dutch fell off, finishing in sixth in 2004 and seventh in 2008.

The Netherlands were not able to return to the Olympics when the sport came back at the 2020 games. They won the 2019 European Baseball Championship, earning entry to the Africa/Europe 2020 Olympic Qualification tournament, held in September 2019. The Dutch finished second behind Israel, receiving another opportunity to qualify, at the Final qualifying tournament. Facing the Dominican Republic and Venezuela, the Netherlands finished last and did not qualify for the Olympics.

The Netherlands can qualify for the 2028 Olympics by placing highly at the 2027 WBSC Premier12 or winning a qualifying tournament.

Olympics Record by Opponent
Opponent	Tournaments met	W-L record	Largest victory		Largest defeat		Current streak
Opponent	Tournaments met	W-L record	Score	Tournament	Score	Tournament	Current streak
Australia	3	2–1	16–6 (F/8)	United States 1996	22–2 (F/7)	Greece 2004	L1
Canada	2	0–2	–		7–0	Greece 2004	L2
China	1	1–0	6–4	China 2008	–		W1
Chinese Taipei	3	1–2	6–1	South Korea 1988	16–0	China 2008	L2
Cuba	4	1–3	4–2	Australia 2000	18–2 (F/7)	United States 1996	L2
Greece	1	1–0	11–0	Greece 2004	–		W1
Italy	3	3–0	10–4	Greece 2004	–		W3
Japan	5	0–5	–		12–2 (F/7)	United States 1996	L5
Nicaragua	1	0–1	–		5–0	United States 1996	L1
Puerto Rico	1	0–1	–		7–4	South Korea 1988	L1
South Africa	1	0–1	–		3–2	Australia 2000	L1
South Korea	3	0–3	–		10–0	China 2008	L3
United States	3	0–3	–		17–1 (F/7)	United States 1996	L3
Overall	5	9–22	Against AUS		Against AUS		L3
Overall	5	9–22	16–6 (F/8)	United States 1996	22–2 (F/7)	Greece 2004	L3

=== WBSC Premier12 ===
WBSC Premier12 record
Year	Result	Position	Pld	W	L	RS	RA	WBSC Rank
(Taiwan) 2015	Quarterfinals	7th	6	3	3	41	27	5th
(Mexico) 2019	Opening Round	10th	3	0	3	6	33	8th
(Mexico) 2024	Opening Round	9th	5	2	3	37	47	7th
2027	To be determined							
Total	Quarterfinals	3/3	14	5	9	84	107	

=== Baseball World Cup ===
Netherlands Baseball World Cup

Amateur World Series
- Colombia, 1970: 12th
- Cuba, 1973: 7th
- Colombia, 1976: 11th
- Italy, 1978: 7th
- Japan, 1980: 12th
- South Korea, 1982: 6th
- Cuba, 1984: 13th
- Netherlands, 1986: 9th

World Cup
- Italy, 1988: 10th
- Canada, 1990: 9th
- Nicaragua, 1994: 10th
- Italy, 1998: 6th
- Taiwan, 2001: 7th
- Cuba, 2003: 9th
- Netherlands, 2005: 4th
- Taiwan, 2007: 4th
- Europe, 2009: 6th
- Panama, 2011: 1st (gold)

The Netherlands' best finish in the Baseball World Cup was first place in 2011. The country hosted the tournament twice, in 1986 and 2005. In 2009, the Netherlands was one of the eight European nations to host the World Cup. It marked the only time that the World Cup was hosted by a continent rather than one country.

World Cup record by opponent (since 1998)
Opponent	Tournaments met	W-L record	Largest victory		Largest defeat		Current streak
Opponent	Tournaments met	W-L record	Score	Tournament	Score	Tournament	Current streak
Australia	5	2–4	6–0	Taiwan 2001	4–1	Italy 2009	W1
Brazil	2	1–1	7–0	Netherlands 2005	2–1	Cuba 2003	W1
Canada	6	3–3	7–3	Netherlands 2005	11–5	Italy 2009	L3
China	2	2–0	13–3 (F/8)	Netherlands 2005	–		W2
Chinese Taipei	5	3–2	11–2	Italy 2009	12–6	Italy 1998	W3
Cuba	6	3–4	4–1 (F/7)	Panama 2011	12–1 (F/7)	Italy 1998	W2
Dominican Republic	2	2–0	7–3	Taiwan 2001	–		W2
Germany	1	1–0	15–5 (F/8)	Taiwan 2007	–		W1
Great Britain	1	1–0	6–0	Netherlands 2009	–		W1
Greece	1	1–0	19–0 (F/5)	Panama 2011	–		W1
France	1	1–0	12–0 (F/7)	Cuba 2003	–		W1
Japan	5	1–4	5–2	Panama 2011	12–2 (F/7)	Cuba 2003	W1
Mexico	1	1–0	6–3	Cuba 2003	–		W1
Nicaragua	2	1–1	8–4	Netherlands 2009	13–2	Italy 1998	W1
Panama	4	2–4	9–5	Netherlands 2005	5–0	Taiwan 2001	W1
Philippines	1	1–0	6–0	Taiwan 2001	–		W1
Puerto Rico	3	3–0	10–0 (F/8)	Netherlands 2005	–		W3
Russia	2	2–0	18–0 (F/7)	Taiwan 2001	–		W2
South Africa	1	1–0	20–2 (F/7)	Netherlands 2005	–		W1
South Korea	5	4–2	6–2	Netherlands 2005	7–0	Netherlands 2005	W3
Spain	1	1–0	10–5	Netherlands 2009	–		W1
Sweden	1	1–0	18–0 (F/8)	Netherlands 2005	–		W1
Thailand	1	1–0	16–0 (F/7)	Taiwan 2007	–		W1
United States	4	2–2	7–5	Panama 2011	8–2	Italy 2009	W1
Venezuela	3	3–0	12–2 (F/7)	Panama 2011	–		W3
Overall	7	44 – 27	Against GRE		Against CUB		W6
Overall	7	44 – 27	19 – 0 (F/5)	Panama 2011	12 – 1 (F/7)	Italy 1998	W6

=== European Baseball Championship ===
The Netherlands won the first European Baseball Championship it competed in, in 1956, and has won 25 tournaments. The team won all of its games in the tournament until losing once in 1971. The only time the team did not play in the finals was 2023, when they lost to Spain in the semifinals.

European Baseball Championship

- 1956: (gold) 1st
- 1957: (gold) 1st
- 1958: (gold) 1st
- 1960: (gold) 1st
- 1962: (gold) 1st
- 1964: (gold) 1st
- 1965: (gold) 1st
- 1969: (gold) 1st
- 1971: (gold) 1st
- 1973: (gold) 1st
- 1975: (silver) 2nd
- 1977: (silver) 2nd
- 1979: (silver) 2nd
- 1981: (gold) 1st
- 1983: (silver) 2nd
- 1985: (gold) 1st
- 1987: (gold) 1st
- 1989: (silver) 2nd
- 1991: (silver) 2nd
- 1993: (gold) 1st
- 1995: (gold) 1st
- 1997: (silver) 2nd
- 1999: (gold) 1st
- 2001: (gold) 1st
- 2003: (gold) 1st
- 2005: (gold) 1st
- 2007: (gold) 1st
- 2010: (silver) 2nd
- 2012: (silver) 2nd
- 2014: (gold) 1st
- 2016: (gold) 1st
- 2019: (gold) 1st
- 2021: (gold) 1st
- 2023: (bronze) 3rd
- 2025: (gold) 1st

=== Other tournament results ===
Intercontinental Cup

- 1983: 4th
- 1999: 8th
- 2002: 8th
- 2006: (silver) 2nd
- 2010: (silver) 2nd

Haarlem Baseball Week

- 1961: 4th
- 1963: (silver) 2nd
- 1966: (silver) 2nd
- 1968: (silver) 2nd
- 1969: (bronze) 3rd
- 1971: 5th
- 1972 B: (silver) 2nd
- 1974: 4th
- 1976: 4th
- 1978: 4th
- 1980: 5th
- 1982: (bronze) 3rd
- 1984: (silver) 2nd
- 1988: (bronze) 3rd
- 1990: (bronze) 3rd
- 1992: (bronze) 3rd
- 1994: (bronze) 3rd
- 1996: (silver) 2nd
- 1998: 4th
- 2000: (bronze) 3rd
- 2002: (silver) 2nd
- 2004: (gold) 1st
- 2006: (gold) 1st
- 2008: 5th
- 2010: (gold) 1st
- 2012: 4th
- 2014: (bronze) 3rd
- 2016: (gold) 1st
- 2018: (bronze) 3rd
- 2022: (gold) 1st
- 2024: (bronze) 3rd

World Port Tournament

- 1985: 4th
- 1987: (bronze) 3rd
- 1989: (gold) 1st
- 1991: 5th
- 1993: (bronze) 3rd
- 1995: (silver) 2nd
- 1997: (silver) 2nd
- 1999: (gold) 1st
- 2001: (silver) 2nd
- 2003: (silver) 2nd
- 2007: 4th
- 2009: (silver) 2nd
- 2011: (bronze) 3rd
- 2013: (silver) 2nd
- 2015: (silver) 2nd
- 2017: 4th
- 2019: (gold) 1st

U-18 Baseball World Cup

- 1989: 11th
- 1990: 10th
- 1991: 8th
- 1992: 10th (tied w/ 3 teams)
- 1993: 6th (tied)
- 1994: 6th (tied)
- 1995: 7th
- 1996: 7th
- 1997: 10th
- 1999: 11th (tied)
- 2000: 9th
- 2002: 9th
- 2004: 9th
- 2006: 8th
- 2008: 9th
- 2010: 6th
- 2012: 11th
- 2017: 8th
- 2019: 7th
- 2021: 5th
- 2023: 6th

U-18 Baseball European Championship

- 2007: (bronze) 3rd
- 2009: (silver) 2nd
- 2011: (gold) 1st
- 2013: (bronze) 3rd
- 2015: (silver) 2nd
- 2016: (gold) 1st
- 2018: (gold) 1st
- 2021: (gold) 1st
- 2022: (silver) 2nd
- 2024: (bronze) 3rd

U-15 Baseball World Cup

- 2009: 8th
- 2011: 7th
- 2018: 8th
- 2024: 10th

U-15 Baseball European Championship

- 2006: (gold) 1st
- 2007: (silver) 2nd
- 2008: (gold) 1st
- 2009: 4th
- 2010: (gold) 1st
- 2011: 4th
- 2012: (gold) 1st
- 2013: (gold) 1st
- 2014: (gold) 1st
- 2017: (bronze) 2nd
- 2019: (bronze) 3rd
- 2021: (bronze) 3rd
- 2023: (gold) 1st
- 2025: (bronze) 3rd

== Players ==
The Dutch Caribbean has very strong baseball traditions. A team from Willemstad, Curaçao, "Liga Pabou" won the 2004 Little League World Series and was runner-up in 2005. Each territory has its own baseball federation, and in the past, the Netherlands Antilles and Aruba have fielded their own teams in international competitions. In recent years, however, players from the Dutch Caribbean have played on the national team of the Netherlands itself, alongside players from continental Europe and a handful of Americans of Dutch descent, resulting in a team with a stronger concentration of talent. For example, Richie Palacios and Joshua Palacios were born and raised in Brooklyn, New York, and Leon Boyd was born and raised in Canada, but all of them have played for the Netherlands due to their having Dutch heritage. Since the 2013 World Baseball Classic, the Netherlands participates as the Kingdom of the Netherlands, the formal name of the sovereign state that includes both the Dutch Caribbean and the Netherlands proper.

== World ranking ==
In January 2009, the International Baseball Federation created a ranking system so that the nations involved in international competition could be compared independently. Teams receive points based on the position they finish at the end of tournaments. The system takes into account results not only of the senior men's teams but also of junior teams. Weightings that emphasise the importance of certain tournaments are based on the number of teams competing, the number of continents represented (or eligible to be represented), and, in the case of continental tournaments such as the European Baseball Championship, the relative strength of teams eligible. Only results from the most recent edition of any tournament within the previous four years are used, so points are added and removed over time. Since the system began, the rankings have been adjusted after the completion of tournaments qualifying for the ranking process.

Date Released	Tournament	Tournament Result	Ranking	Points	Position Above			Position Below		
Date Released	Tournament	Tournament Result	Ranking	Points	Rank	Team	Points Difference	Rank	Team	Points Difference
13 January 2009	2008 Summer Olympics^{*}	7th	6th	336.57	5th	Chinese Taipei	+121.93	7th	Canada	-74.38
24 March 2009	2009 World Baseball Classic	7th	6th	382.57	5th	Chinese Taipei	+89.25	7th	Mexico	-102.32
12 August 2009^{**}	2009 World Port Tournament	2nd	6th	412.57	5th	Chinese Taipei	+179.25	7th	Mexico	-109.82
19 October 2009^{**}	2009 World Youth Baseball Championship	8th	6th	405.33	5th	Chinese Taipei	+156.30	7th	Canada	-45.14
19 October 2009^{**}	2009 Baseball World Cup	6th	6th	405.33	5th	Chinese Taipei	+156.30	7th	Canada	-45.14
6 December 2010^{**}	2010 Haarlem Baseball Week	1st	6th	374.51	5th	Chinese Taipei	+149.85	7th	Venezuela	-22.20
6 December 2010^{**}	2010 European Baseball Championship	2nd	6th	374.51	5th	Chinese Taipei	+149.85	7th	Venezuela	-22.20
6 December 2010^{**}	2010 World Junior Baseball Championship	6th	6th	374.51	5th	Chinese Taipei	+149.85	7th	Venezuela	-22.20
6 December 2010^{**}	2010 Intercontinental Cup	2nd	6th	374.51	5th	Chinese Taipei	+149.85	7th	Venezuela	-22.20
31 October 2011^{**}	2011 World Port Tournament	3rd	5th	483.51	4th	Japan	+172.91	6th	Canada	-24.68
31 October 2011^{**}	2011 Baseball World Cup	1st	5th	483.51	4th	Japan	+172.91	6th	Canada	-24.68
18 September 2012^{**}	2012 Haarlem Baseball Week	4th	6th	476.76	5th	Canada	+8.24	7th	Venezuela	-17.13
18 September 2012^{**}	2012 18U Baseball World Championship	11th	6th	476.76	5th	Canada	+8.24	7th	Venezuela	-17.13
18 September 2012^{**}	2012 European Baseball Championship	2nd	6th	476.76	5th	Canada	+8.24	7th	Venezuela	-17.13
20 March 2013^{**}	2013 World Port Tournament	2nd	5th	497.76	4th	Chinese Taipei	+44.03	6th	Canada	-5.74
20 March 2013^{**}	2013 World Baseball Classic	4th	5th	497.76	4th	Chinese Taipei	+44.03	6th	Canada	-5.74

* When the rankings were first released, the 2008 Summer Olympics was the most recent tournament completed by the Netherlands that had any bearing on the rankings themselves.
** Multiple tournaments were held since the previous release of the rankings.

== See also ==
- Baseball in the Netherlands
- Netherlands women's national baseball team
- Dutch Roster in 2006 World Baseball Classic
- Dutch Roster in 2009 World Baseball Classic
- Dutch Roster in 2009 Baseball World Cup
