= Dashenko Ricardo =

Dutch baseball player (born 1990)

- Catcher
- Born: March 1, 1990 (age 36); Willemstad, Curaçao
- Bats: Right Throws: Right
- Stats at Baseball Reference
Medals
Men's baseball
Representing Netherlands
European Baseball Championship
Gold medal – first place	2014 Brno	National team
Gold medal – first place	2016 Hoofddorp	National team
Gold medal – first place	2019 Bonn	National team
Gold medal – first place	2021 Turin	National team
Bronze medal – third place	2023 Czechia	National team
Haarlem Baseball Week
Gold medal – first place	2016 Haarlem	National team
World Port Tournament
Silver medal – second place	2015 Netherlands	National team
France International Baseball Tournament
Gold medal – first place	2014 Sénart	National team
Gold medal – first place	2016 Sénart	National team

Dashenko Adriano Ricardo (born March 1, 1990) is a Dutch-Curaçaoan professional baseball catcher. He played for the Netherlands national team in three World Baseball Classics and several European Baseball Championships. He played in Minor League Baseball from 2007 to 2013 and in 2019, then played in the Honkbal Hoofdklasse from 2014 to 2022.

== Career ==
=== Baltimore Orioles ===
Ricardo signed as an undrafted free agent with the Baltimore Orioles on July 18, 2006. He made his professional debut in 2007 with the Dominican Summer League Orioles, batting .297 and hitting his only home run with the organization. In 2008, he played for the rookie ball GCL Orioles, slashing .169/.199/.199 in 39 games. In 2009, Ricardo played for the Rookie-level Bluefield Orioles and the Single-A Delmarva Shorebirds, hitting .234/.266/.304 between the two teams. He split the 2010 season between Bluefield and the Low-A Aberdeen IronBirds, batting .187/.230/.262 with one home run and 6 runs batted in (RBI).

=== San Francisco Giants ===
The San Francisco Giants selected Ricardo in the minor league phase of the Rule 5 draft after the 2010 season. He pitched for the Arizona League Giants in 2011, recording a 9.00 ERA in 3 appearances. In 2012, Ricardo hit for the Low-A Salem-Keizer Volcanoes, slashing .253/.268/.333 with 2 home runs and 17 RBI. On January 24, 2013, the Giants released Ricardo.

=== Los Angeles Dodgers ===
Ricardo signed a minor league contract with the Los Angeles Dodgers on March 17, 2013. He again was converted to a pitcher to start the season, returning to catcher by the end of April. He bounced around the Dodgers' system, appearing in 26 games for the Single-A Great Lakes Loons, nine for the Double-A Chattanooga Lookouts and two for the Triple-A Albuquerque Isotopes. On March 9, 2014, the Dodgers released Ricardo.

=== Kinheim ===
In March 2014, Ricardo signed with Kinheim of the Honkbal Hoofdklasse. He hit .266/.307/.424 with 3 home runs and 28 RBI in 2014. Ricardo greatly improved in 2015, slashing .420/.441/.609 with four home runs and a career-high 40 RBI in 42 games. He won the league's Most Valuable Player Award, leading the league in hits, total bases, and batting average with runners in scoring position.

=== Neptunus ===
On November 2, 2015, Ricardo joined Neptunus of the Honkbal Hoofdklasse. In 25 games for the team in 2016, he hit .404/.448/.543. On June 7, Ricardo retired from professional baseball, stating that "he cannot motivate himself anymore to play baseball."

=== Lincoln Saltdogs ===
Ricardo's retirement was short lived as he signed with the Lincoln Saltdogs of the American Association of Independent Professional Baseball on November 2, 2016. In 69 games for Lincoln in 2017, Ricardo slashed .270/.309/.371. On January 11, 2018, Ricardo re-signed with Lincoln. Ricardo batted .269/.307/.379 with 5 home runs and 35 RBI in 2018.

=== Tampa Bay Rays ===
On December 18, 2018, Ricardo signed with the Sioux Falls Canaries of the American Association of Independent Professional Baseball. On March 22, 2019, Ricardo's contract was sold to the Tampa Bay Rays. He played in Triple-A with the Durham Bulls, hitting a three-run home run in his first game with the team. In 16 games through the end of July, he slashed .171/.211/.314. Ricardo elected free agency following the season on November 4.

=== Neptunus (second stint) ===
On December 29, 2019, Ricardo signed with the Gateway Grizzlies of the Frontier League. On July 20, 2020, he joined Neptunus of the Honkbal Hoofdklasse after the Frontier League season was cancelled due to the COVID-19 pandemic. He hit .271/.325/.386 in 18 games in 2020. He played with the Rotterdam club through the 2022 season.

=== Royal Scorpions ===
Ricardo played for Royal Scorpions in the Curaçao National Championship AA League from 2023 to 2025. He played for the Curaçao team in the 2023 Caribbean Series.

== International career ==
As a member of the Netherlands national team Ricardo played in the 2013, 2017, and 2023 World Baseball Classics (WBC). In the 2017 WBC, he scored the winning run in a walk-off win over Chinese Taipei. In the 2026 WBC, he was the Dutch team's bullpen catcher.

Ricardo was also on the Dutch team's roster for the 2009 Baseball World Cup and the European Baseball Championship in 2014, 2016, 2019, 2021, and 2023. He hit a home run in the bronze medal game of the 2023 championship. Ricardo also played in the 2014 France International Baseball Tournament, 2015 World Port Tournament, 2015 WBSC Premier12, 2016 Haarlem Baseball Week, 2016 France International Baseball Tournament, and the Africa/Europe 2020 Olympic Qualification tournament in 2019. In the 2015 World Port Tournament, he had three RBI in a win over Cuba.
