= J. C. Sulbaran =

Dutch-Curaçao baseball player (born 1989)

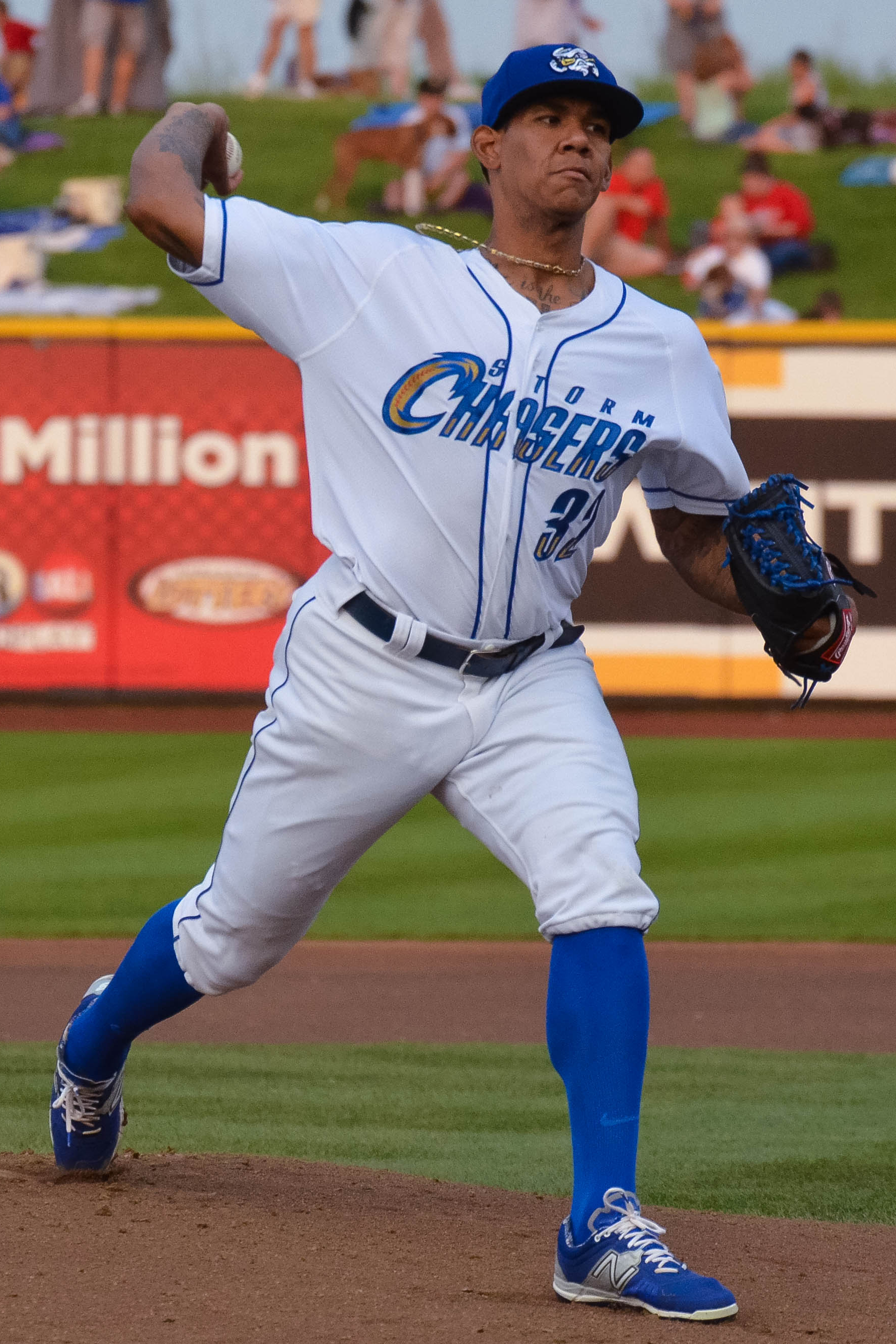
- Sulbaran pitching for Omaha in 2015

Neptunus – No. 88
- Pitcher
- Born: November 9, 1989 (age 36); Willemstad, Netherlands Antilles
- Bats: Right Throws: Right
- Stats at Baseball Reference
Medals
Men's baseball
Representing Netherlands
Baseball World Cup
Gold medal – first place	2011 Panama	National team
European Baseball Championship
Gold medal – first place	2019 Bonn	Team
Gold medal – first place	2021 Turin	Team
Bronze medal – third place	2023 Czech Republic	Team
France International Baseball Tournament
Gold medal – first place	2014 Sénart	National team

Juan Carlos Sulbaran (born November 9, 1989) is a Dutch-Curaçaoan professional baseball pitcher for the Curaçao Neptunus of the Honkbal Hoofdklasse. He pitched in Minor League Baseball from 2009 to 2016. He has played for the Dutch national team in several international tournaments, including the 2008 Olympics and four editions of the World Baseball Classic.

He throws a changeup, curveball and fastball (which peaked at 95 mph in 2011).

== Career ==
Sulbaran was voted the best pitcher in the 2004 Latin American Youth Baseball Tournament while playing for the Netherlands Antilles. He came to the United States in 2006 to play high school baseball. He played at American Heritage School in Plantation, Florida. He missed most of 2007 because of an injury, though he struck out 24 in 12 innings. In 2008, he went 11–0 with a 1.40 ERA, striking out 88 in 67 innings and allowing 31 hits to help his team to a state championship.

=== Cincinnati Reds ===
The Cincinnati Reds selected Sulbaran in the 30th round, 899th overall, of the 2008 Major League Baseball draft. He was drafted late due to his commitment to play college baseball for the Florida Gators. He signed with the Reds on August 14 for a $500,000 signing bonus, which was a record for the 30th round.

Sulbaran made his professional debut in 2009 with the Single-A Dayton Dragons, starting 21 games and logging a 5–5 record and 5.24 earned run average (ERA) with 100 strikeouts in 92 innings pitched. He returned to Dayton in 2010, starting another 15 games (with one relief appearance) and pitching to a 4–6 record and 4.99 ERA with 83 strikeouts in 79 1/3 innings of work.

In 2011, Sulbaran played for the High-A Bakersfield Blaze. In 26 starts for the team, he had a 9–6 record and 4.60 ERA with 155 strikeouts in 137 innings pitched. He began the 2012 season with the Double-A Pensacola Blue Wahoos. Sulbaran started 19 games for Pensacola, pitching to a 7–7 record and 4.04 ERA with 111 strikeouts in 104 2/3 innings pitched.

=== Kansas City Royals ===
On July 31, 2012, Sulbaran and Donnie Joseph were traded to the Kansas City Royals for reliever Jonathan Broxton. Sulbaran finished the season making six starts for the Double-A Northwest Arkansas Naturals. Sulbaran began the 2013 season with Northwest Arkansas and also spent time with the High-A Wilmington Blue Rocks. In 33 combined appearances (10 starts), he struggled to a 4–7 record and 6.16 ERA with 55 strikeouts in 80 1/3 innings pitched.

Sulbaran returned to Northwest Arkansas for the entire 2014 season, pitching in 25 games (starting 23) and registering an 8–10 record and 3.25 ERA with 116 strikeouts in 127 1/3 innings pitched. He split the 2015 season between Northwest Arkansas and the Triple-A Omaha Storm Chasers, making a combined 28 appearances (23 starts) and posting a 7–10 record and 5.24 ERA with 99 strikeouts in 132 1/3 innings pitched. Sulbaran elected free agency following the season on November 7.

=== St. Louis Cardinals ===
On December 4, 2015, Sulbaran signed a minor league contract with the St. Louis Cardinals organization. He split the 2016 season between the Double-A Springfield Cardinals and Triple-A Memphis Redbirds. In 28 appearances (27 starts), Sulbaran pitched to a combined 5–10 record and 5.24 ERA with 116 strikeouts in 146 innings pitched. He elected free agency following the season on November 7, 2016.

Sulbaran missed the entire 2017 season after suffering a broken collarbone in a car crash shortly after the 2017 World Baseball Classic.

=== Silicon Storks ===
On June 2, 2018, Sulbaran signed with the Silicon Storks of the Honkbal Hoofdklasse. In three starts, he had an 0–1 record and 4.00 ERA with 13 strikeouts in 9 innings pitched.

=== Winnipeg Goldeyes ===
On July 3, 2018, Sulbaran signed with the Winnipeg Goldeyes of the American Association of Professional Baseball. In six starts, Sulbaran pitched to a 1–2 record and 5.97 ERA with 20 strikeouts in 28 2/3 innings pitched. The Goldeyes released him on August 14.

=== DSS ===
On March 22, 2019, Sulbaran signed with DSS of the Hoofdklasse to serve as a reinforcement while Nick Keur recovered from Tommy John surgery. In 2019, he pitched to a 2–9 record and 4.16 ERA with 70 strikeouts in 75 2/3 innings pitched across 14 games (13 starts).

=== Amsterdam Pirates ===
Sulbaran joined the Amsterdam Pirates of the Hoofdklasse in 2020. Making seven starts for the team, he pitched to a 5–2 record and 3.60 ERA with 34 strikeouts in 40 innings pitched. Returning to the team in 2021, he started 12 games, pitching to an 8–1 record and a 1.61 ERA with 62 strikeouts in 61 1/3 innings.

=== Neptunus ===
On November 20, 2021, Sulbaran was traded to the Neptunus of the Hoofdklasse. He replaced Diego Markwell in the rotation, as Markwell moved to the bullpen. Sulbaran started 14 games for the Rotterdam club in 2022, posting a 9–2 record and 2.20 ERA with 70 strikeouts in 82 innings pitched.

=== Lexington Counter Clocks ===
On March 16, 2023, Sulbaran signed with the Lexington Counter Clocks of the Atlantic League. In 12 appearances (7 starts) for the Counter Clocks, he posted a 1–4 record and 7.23 ERA with 25 strikeouts across 37 1/3 innings of work. Lexington released Sulbaran on February 27, 2024.

=== Neptunus (second stint) ===
On March 27, 2024, Sulbaran re-signed with the Neptunus of the Hoofdklasse. In 16 starts, Sulbaran compiled an 11–0 record and 1.44 ERA with 87 strikeouts across 94 innings pitched. He received the league's pitcher of the year award.

=== Caliente de Durango ===
On March 14, 2025, Sulbaran signed with the Caliente de Durango of the Mexican Baseball League. In three appearances (two starts) for Durango, he struggled to a 1–1 record and 10.00 ERA with eight strikeouts across nine innings of work. Durango released him on May 5.

=== Rieleros de Aguascalientes ===
On May 10, 2025, Sulbaran signed with the Rieleros de Aguascalientes of the Mexican League. In two appearances for Aguascalientes, he struggled to a 10.80 ERA with one strikeout across 3 1/3 innings pitched. Sulbaran was released by the Rieleros on May 17.

=== Neptunus (third stint) ===
On June 18, 2025, Sulbaran re-signed with Neptunus. He was more effective in the Dutch league, with a 2–0 record and 1.90 ERA in six games, including four starts.

== International career ==
Sulbaran joined the Netherlands Antilles national baseball team for the 2008 Haarlem Baseball Week and got a no-decision against Cuba. He allowed one hit and one run in 7 innings, with 6 strikeouts and 7 walks. The only run came when Giorvis Duvergel stole home. He later struck out three Americans in one scoreless inning in a mercy rule loss. The performance earned him a spot on the Netherlands team for the 2008 Summer Olympics. He was the only player on the team who had never appeared for the Dutch team before.

Sulbaran played for the Netherlands in the World Baseball Classic tournaments in 2009, 2017, 2023 and 2026. In the 2023 WBC, he pitched two scoreless innings in one game.

Sulbaran also played for the Netherlands in the 2019 European Championship, the Africa/Europe 2020 Olympic Qualification tournament, and the 2019 WBSC Premier12.
