= Lars Huijer =

Dutch baseball player (born 1993)

Amsterdam Pirates – No. 39
- Pitcher
- Born: 22 September 1993 (age 32); Haarlem, Netherlands
- Bats: Right Throws: Right

Professional debut
- Minor League Baseball: 2011, for the Seattle Mariners
- International Baseball: 2016, for the Netherlands National Baseball Team
- Stats at Baseball Reference
Medals
Men's baseball
Representing Netherlands
European Baseball Championship
Gold medal – first place	2016 Hoofddorp	National team
Gold medal – first place	2019 Bonn Solingen	National team
Gold medal – first place	2021 Turin	National team
Gold medal – first place	2025 Rotterdam	National team
Bronze medal – third place	2023 Czech Republic	National team

Lars Huijer (born 22 September 1993) is a Dutch professional baseball pitcher for the Amsterdam Pirates of the Honkbal Hoofdklasse and the Netherlands national team.

== Professional career ==
Huijer debuted as a professional with the Hoofdoorp Pioniers in 2010, also pitching for the club in 2011.

Huijer signed with the Seattle Mariners in June 2011 for $170,000. He was named the Northwest League All-Star and Pitcher of the Month for August 2013 while playing for the Everett AquaSox. He advanced in the Mariners' farm system to the High-A High Desert Mavericks before he was traded to the Chicago Cubs for Mike Kickham in January 2015. He retired from American baseball that March.

Huijer then returned to pitch for the Pioniers, staying with that club until 2020. In September 2020, he joined German baseball club Heidenheim Heideköpfe. He returned to the Hoofdklasse in 2021, joining HCAW in Bussum. Huijer said he almost retired after the 2024 season, citing a heavy workload and the loss of funding for baseball from the Dutch government, but returned to HCAW in June 2025. He only pitched in 6 games that season, his fewest except for the COVID-19 pandemic shortened 2020 season. After the season, he and many of his teammates transferred to Amsterdam Pirates, citing issues with HCAW's board.

Huijer was named the best pitcher in the Hoofdklasse in 2019, 2021, 2022, and 2023.

== International career ==
Huijer has played for the Netherlands national baseball team in several international tournaments. He played in the 2016 European Baseball Championship, held at his then-home field in Hoofdoorp, 2019 European championship, Africa/Europe 2020 Olympic Qualification tournament and Final Qualifying Tournament, 2021 European championship, 2023 European championship, and 2025 European championship.

He has also played for the Netherlands at the 2017 World Baseball Classic (WBC), 2023 WBC, and 2024 WBSC Premier12.
