= Dennis Neuman =

Dutch baseball player

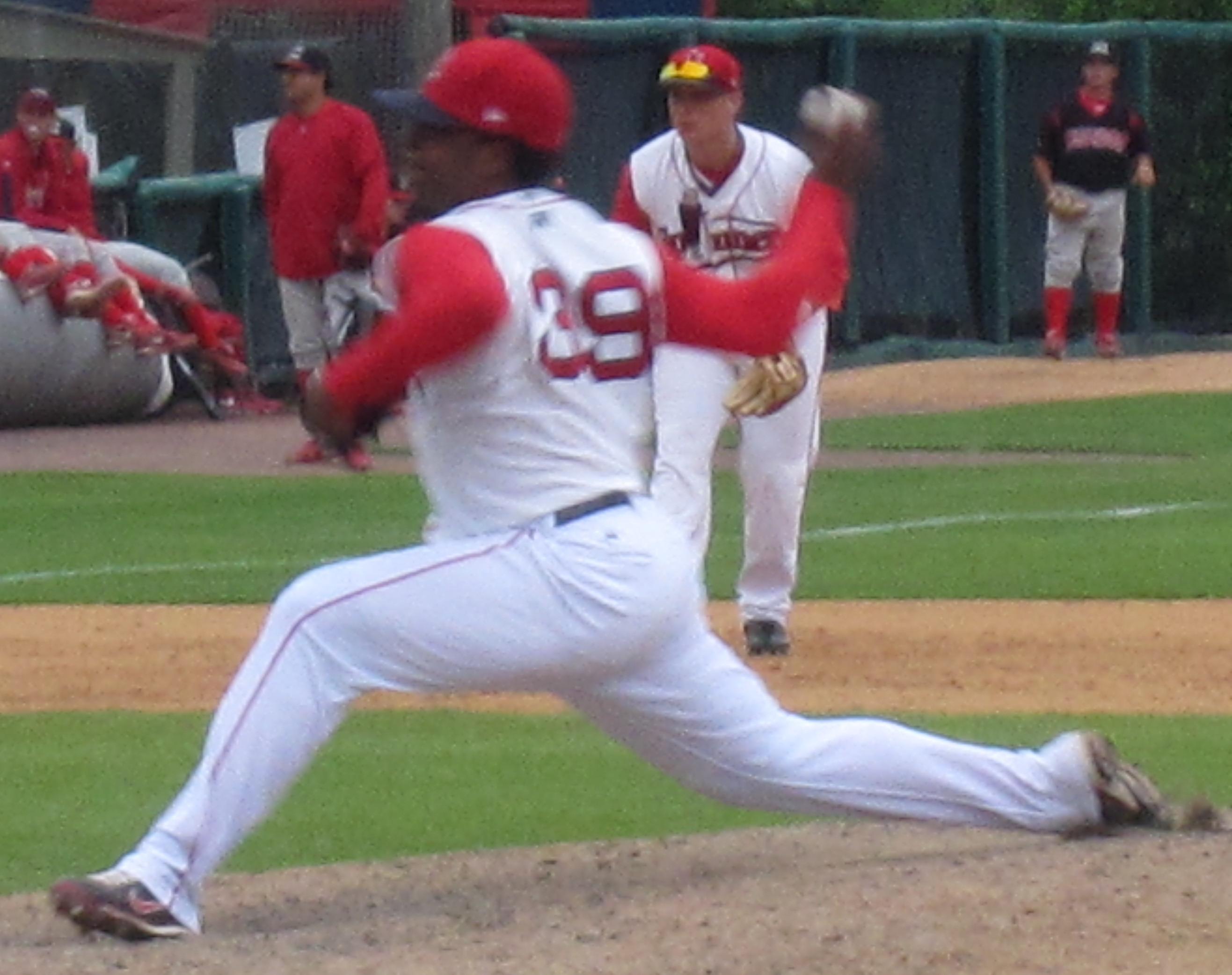
- Neuman with the Lowell Spinners in 2009
- Pitcher
- Born: October 18, 1989 (age 36); Willemstad, Curaçao
- Bats: Right Throws: Right
- Stats at Baseball Reference

Dennis Neuman (born October 18, 1989) is a Dutch professional baseball player and scout. A pitcher, he pitched in the Boston Red Sox organization and for the Netherlands national baseball team in the 2009 World Baseball Classic (WBC).

Neuman competed for Curaçao in the 2002 Little League World Series, leading the team to a third-place finish. He pitched for the Red Sox organization from 2007 through 2011, appearing in the South Atlantic League All-Star Game in 2010. That season, he led the Greenville Drive with 14 saves. In the 2009 WBC, he pitched in five games in reliëf, allowing three earned runs in 3 2/3 innings pitched.

On December 21, 2012, the Red Sox announced that they hired Neuman to be a scout in Curacao and Aruba.
