= Donnie Joseph =

American baseball player (born 1987)

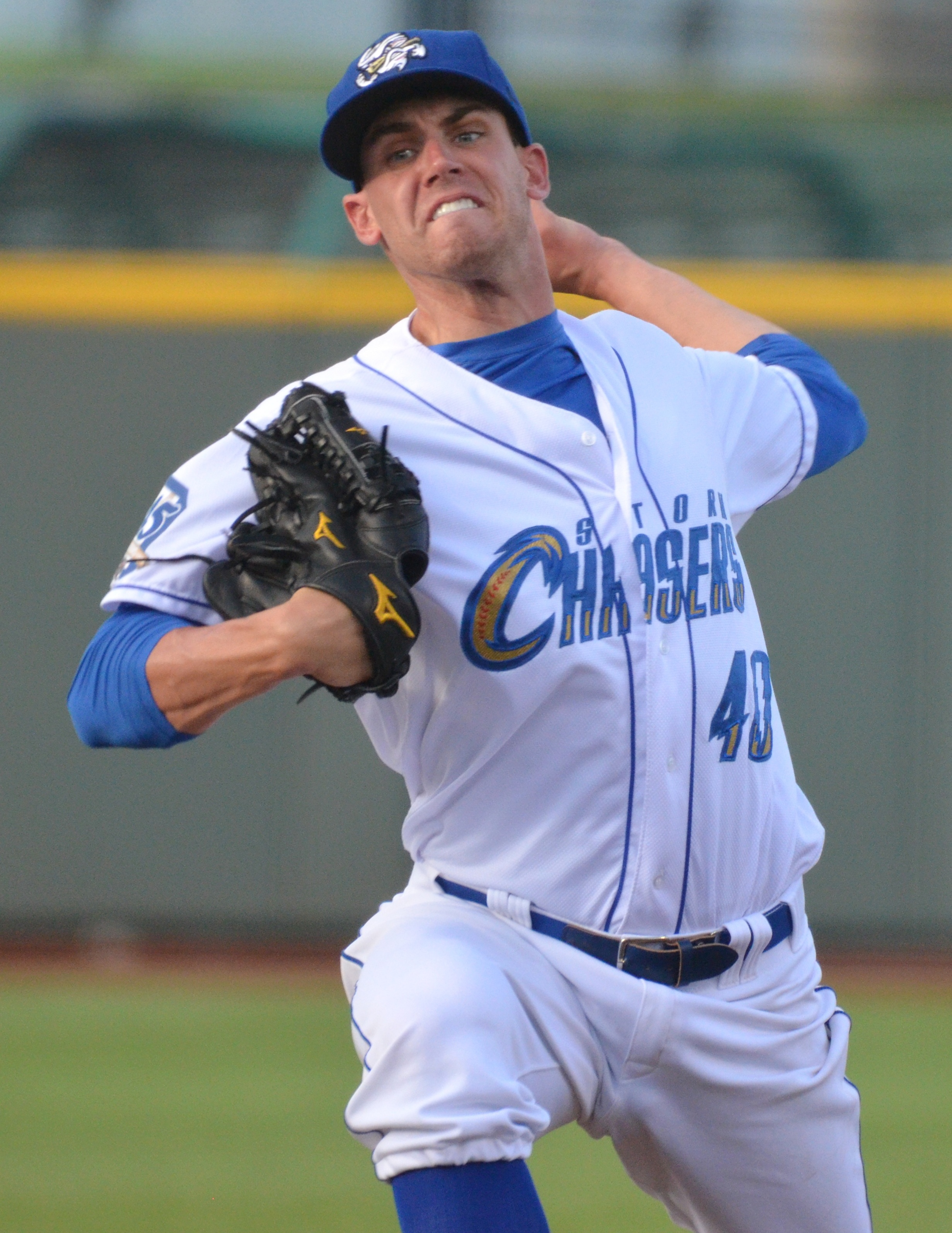
- Joseph with the Omaha Storm Chasers in 2013
- Pitcher
- Born: November 1, 1987 (age 37); San Marcos, Texas, U.S.
- Batted: Right Threw: Left

MLB debut
- July 11, 2013, for the Kansas City Royals

Last MLB appearance
- June 16, 2014, for the Kansas City Royals

MLB statistics
- Win–loss record: 0–0
- Earned run average: 8.53
- Strikeouts: 9
- Stats at Baseball Reference

Teams
- Kansas City Royals (2013–2014)

Don Atley Joseph (born November 1, 1987) is an American former professional baseball pitcher. He played in Major League Baseball (MLB) in 2013 and 2014 for the Kansas City Royals.

== Early life ==
Joseph graduated from Hays High School, where he played baseball, football and basketball for the Rebels in 2006. He pitched for the Houston Cougars, from 2007 to 2009. In 2007 as a freshman, he went 1–1 with a 6.42 ERA, striking out 23 in 54.2 innings in 18 games (10 starts). In 2008 as a sophomore, he went 2–1 with a 5.72 ERA, striking out 40 in 56.2 innings. In 2009 as a junior, he was used as a reliever, where in 31 appearances, he went 3–1 with a 2.16 ERA and 11 saves, striking out 75 in 50 innings.

== Professional career ==
=== Cincinnati Reds ===
Joseph was drafted in the 3rd round (88th overall) by the Cincinnati Reds in the 2009 Major League Baseball draft. Joseph was assigned to the Advanced-Rookie Billings Mustangs, where he pitched in 8 games before earning a promotion to the Single-A Dayton Dragons on July 22, where he pitched in 16 games before the end of the season. In 24 games in 2009, he went 4–3 with a 3.06 ERA, striking out 42 in 32 1/3 innings. Joseph began 2010 with the Dragons before earning a promotion to the High-A Lynchburg Hillcats on May 27, where he pitched in 31 games. At the end of the season, he earned a promotion to the Double-A Carolina Mudcats, where he pitched in 7 games. In 57 games in 2010, he went 3–5 with a 2.08 ERA and 24 saves, striking out 103 in 65 games. After the year, he was named Cincinnati's Minor League Pitcher of the Year. Joseph went to spring training with the Reds in 2011, where he pitched in 5 games, giving up 8 runs (5 earned) in 5 1/3 innings. Joseph pitched all of the 2011 season with Carolina, where in a league-leading 57 appearances, he went 1–3 with a 6.94 ERA, striking out 66 in 58 1/3 innings. After the year, Joseph pitched in the Arizona Fall League with Phoenix, where, in 12 appearances, he went 1–1 with a 2.16 ERA, striking out 17 in 16 2/3 innings. Joseph began 2012 with the Double-A Pensacola Blue Wahoos, where he pitched in 26 games before earning a promotion to the Triple-A Louisville Bats on June 9. He was a Southern League Mid-Season All-Star. He pitched in 18 games with the Bats before being traded.

=== Kansas City Royals ===
On July 31, 2012, he was traded to the Kansas City Royals alongside J. C. Sulbaran in exchange for Jonathan Broxton. He was assigned to the Triple-A Omaha Storm Chasers, where he finished the season. In 55 games in 2012, he went 9–3 with a 2.33 ERA, striking out 87 in 69 2/3 innings. On November 20, 2012, the Royals added Joseph to their 40-man roster in order to protect him from the Rule 5 draft. Joseph began 2013 with Omaha before his promotion.

On July 11, 2013, Joseph was promoted to the major leagues for the first time, replacing Wade Davis, who was on paternity leave. He made his MLB debut that day, pitching a scoreless third of an inning against the New York Yankees. He made another appearances before being optioned to Omaha 2 days later in favor of a fresher arm, southpaw Everett Teaford. His first Major League strikeout was of Cleveland Indians infielder Jason Kipnis. On August 10, he was recalled, and he made an appearance that day against the Boston Red Sox, but he was optioned the next day. After Omaha's season ended, Joseph was recalled on September 3 after the rosters had expanded. In 47 games with Omaha, he went 4–3 with a 3.95 ERA, striking out 84 in 54 2/3 innings. Joseph pitched in 3 games with the Royals in September to end the season. In 6 games with Kansas City in 2013, he finished 2 games, giving up 4 hits and 0 runs with 7 strikeouts in 5 2/3 innings. Joseph was designated for assignment by the Royals on June 24, 2014, having only made one appearance for the big league team that year in which he allowed 6 earned runs in 2/3 of an inning.

=== Miami Marlins ===
On June 30, 2014, Joseph was traded to the Miami Marlins in exchange for cash considerations. On July 31, Joseph was designated for assignment by Miami; he was sent outright to the Triple-A New Orleans Zephyrs on August 3. He finished the year with New Orleans, but struggled to a 9.58 ERA in 9 appearances. On March 24, 2015, Joseph was released by the Marlins organization.

=== New Jersey Jackals ===
On April 17, 2015, Joseph signed with the New Jersey Jackals of the Can-Am League. In 35 appearances with the Jackals, Joseph logged a 3–3 record and 5.49 ERA with 51 strikeouts in 41.0 innings pitched. On January 20, 2016, Joseph was released by New Jersey.

=== Rockland Boulders ===
Joseph signed with the Rockland Boulders of the Can-Am League prior to the 2016 season. On June 28, Joseph was released by the team. On July 30, Joseph re-signed with Rockland. In 18 total games for the Boulders, Joseph logged a 7.16 ERA. He became a free agent after the 2016 season.
