= Shairon Martis =

Dutch-Curacaoan baseball player (born 1987)

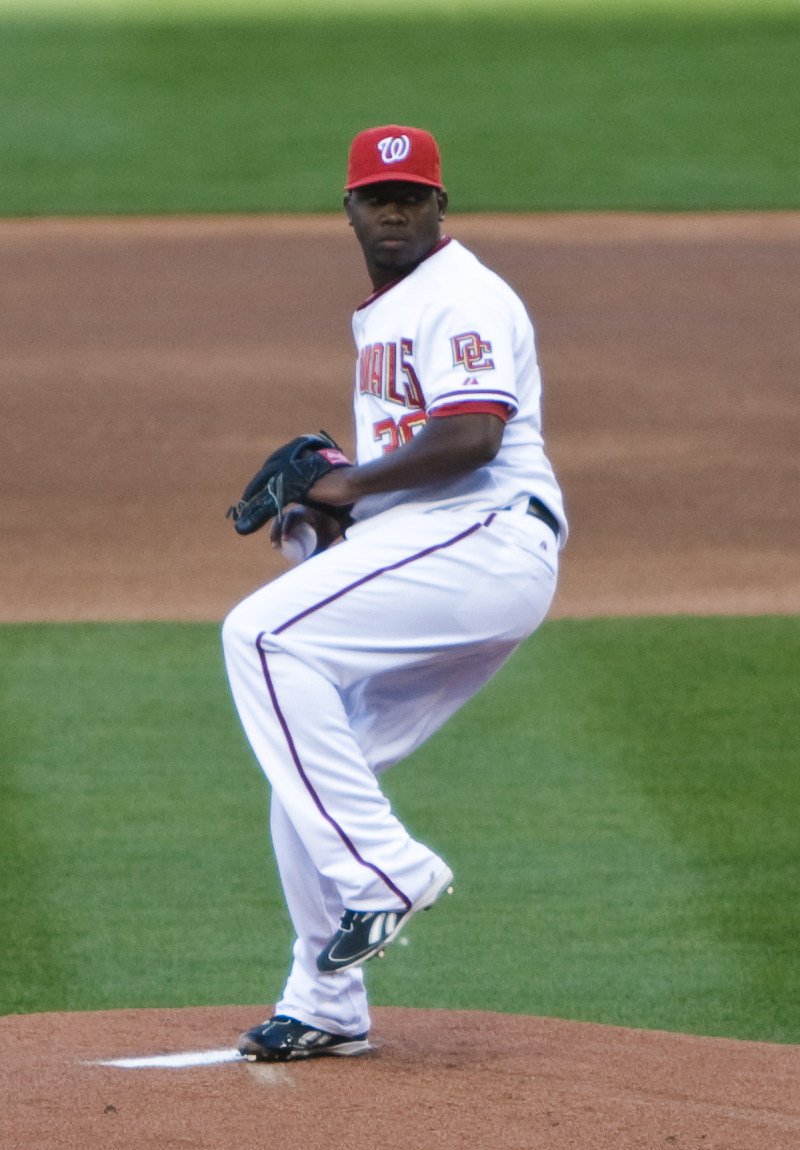
- Martis with the Washington Nationals

Neptunus – No. 39
- Pitcher
- Born: March 30, 1987 (age 39); Willemstad, Curaçao
- Bats: Right Throws: Right

MLB debut
- September 4, 2008, for the Washington Nationals

MLB statistics (through 2013 season)
- Win–loss record: 6–7
- Earned run average: 5.35
- Strikeouts: 64
- Stats at Baseball Reference

Teams
- Washington Nationals (2008–2009); Minnesota Twins (2013)
Medals
Men's baseball
Representing Netherlands
Baseball World Cup
Gold medal – first place	2011 Panama	Team
European Championship
Gold medal – first place	2007 Spain	Team
Gold medal – first place	2016 Hoofddorp	Team
Gold medal – first place	2019 Bonn	Team
Gold medal – first place	2021 Turin	Team
Gold medal – first place	2025 Rotterdam	Team
Bronze medal – third place	2023 Czechia	Team

Shairon Benjamin Martis (SHY-ron mar-TEES, born March 30, 1987) is a Dutch-Curaçaoan professional baseball pitcher for Neptunus of the Honkbal Hoofdklasse. He pitched in Major League Baseball (MLB) for the Washington Nationals in 2008 and 2009 and Minnesota Twins in 2013. He played for the Uni-President 7-Eleven Lions of the Taiwanese Chinese Professional Baseball League (CPBL) in 2014. After several years in American independent baseball, he came to the Dutch Hoofdklasse in 2020.

Martis has pitched for the Netherlands national team. He threw a no-hitter in the 2006 World Baseball Classic (WBC) and has pitched in the WBC in 2013, 2017, 2023, and 2026. He holds the WBC record for innings pitched. He was on the Dutch team that won the 2011 Baseball World Cup and five European Championships and competed in the 2008 Summer Olympics.

== Amateur career ==
In 2002, Martis was a member of the Curaçao team that won the Senior League World Series championship in Bangor, Maine. He was teammates with Jair Jurrjens and Sharlon Schoop.

== Professional career ==
=== San Francisco Giants ===
Martis was signed by the San Francisco Giants in 2004. In 2005, he pitched in 11 games with 5 starts. His record was 2–1 with a 1.85 ERA for the Giants' Arizona Rookie League team. Martis began the 2006 season with Augusta in the Low A South Atlantic League, where he accrued a 6–4 record and 3.64 ERA in 15 starts.

=== Washington Nationals ===
On July 28, 2006, the Nationals acquired Martis from the San Francisco Giants for veteran left-handed reliever Mike Stanton. Martis joined the Savannah Sand Gnats of the South Atlantic League on August 1. After going 1–1 with a 3.80 ERA in four starts at Savannah, he was promoted to the High-A Potomac Nationals. He pitched two games in Potomac, giving up 4 earned runs in 12 innings. He ended the season with one appearance for the Double-A Harrisburg Senators, allowing 7 runs in 5 innings.

In 2007, Martis pitched for Potomac the entire season. In 26 starts and one relief appearance, he logged a 4.23 ERA over 151 innings, striking out 108 batters while issuing 52 walks.

Martis started the 2008 in Harrisburg. After going 4–4 with a 3.98 ERA and a 1.35 WHIP in 14 starts, he was promoted on June 21 to Triple-A Columbus, where he went 1–2 with a 3.02 ERA in 7 starts, striking out 42 batters and walking 17. He was selected as a member of the World Team for the All-Star Futures Game at Yankee Stadium.

Martis was called up to the Nationals on September 2, with the intent of assigning him to the bullpen. However, an injury to starter Collin Balester opened a spot for Martis in the starting rotation. He made his major league debut September 4, against the Atlanta Braves. He gave up 2 runs in 5 innings, earning the loss. He struck out the first batter he faced, Gregor Blanco. Chipper Jones got the first hit off Martis. In his first plate appearance, he drew a walk from Braves rookie James Parr, who, like Martis, was also making his first major-league appearance. Martis struck out Parr in Parr's first at-bat earlier in the game. Martis got his first major league win on September 23, against the Florida Marlins.

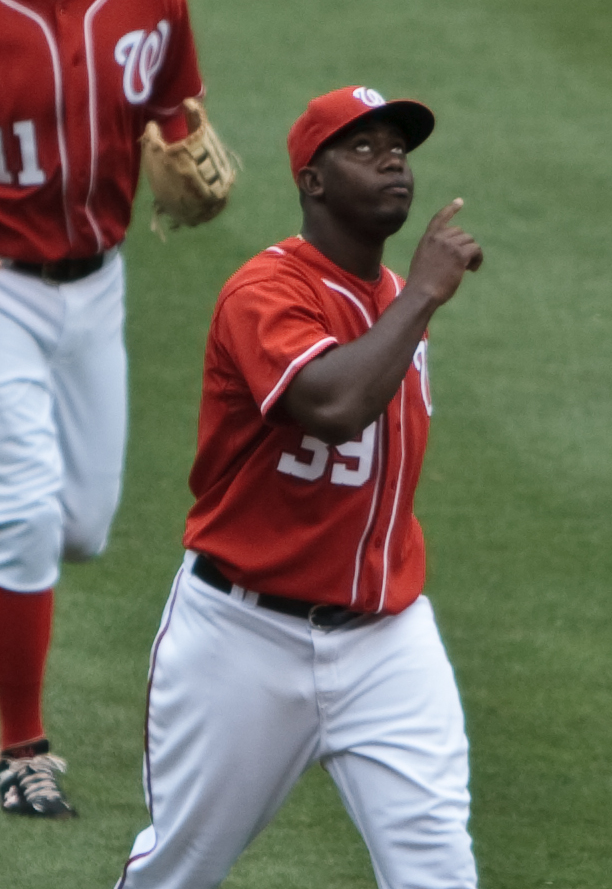
Martis during his MLB complete game in May 2009

On May 2, 2009, against the St. Louis Cardinals, Martis pitched his first career complete game, the Nationals' first complete game since Pedro Astacio in 2006. Martis started the season with a 5–0 record but then faltered and was optioned to Triple-A on June 28. Martis had a career-high 85 2/3 innings pitched in MLB, with a 5–3 record and 5.25 ERA.

Martis spend all of 2010 in Triple-A Triple-A Syracuse, leading the team in wins, strikeouts, starts, and innings pitched. He was designated for assignment by the Nationals on January 24, 2011. He cleared waivers and was sent outright to the minors on February 2. He pitched in Double-A all season. He threw a seven-inning no-hitter on August 26, which earned him the Eastern League Pitcher of the Week award. He elected free agency following the season on November 2.

=== Pittsburgh Pirates ===
On November 23, 2011, Martis signed a minor league contract with the Pittsburgh Pirates. He began the 2012 season in Triple-A, went on the disabled list in mid-April with elbow inflammation, then was sent down to the Double-A Altoona Curve.

=== Minnesota Twins ===
On June 27, 2012, Martis was traded to the Minnesota Twins in exchange for cash or a player to be named later. On November 20, he re-signed with the Twins on a minor league contract.

The Twins added Martis to their major league roster on September 9, 2013. In 9 2/3 innings in his last stint in the majors, he had a 5.59 ERA and seven strikeouts. On October 2, Martis was removed from the 40-man roster and sent outright to the Triple-A Rochester Red Wings. He elected free agency on October 7.

=== Uni-President 7-Eleven Lions ===
On February 26, 2014, Martis signed with the Uni-President 7-Eleven Lions of the Chinese Professional Baseball League. He was 8–7 with a 3.15 ERA in 28 games, 23 of them starts.

=== Bridgeport Bluefish ===
On May 20, 2015, Martis signed with the Bridgeport Bluefish of the Atlantic League of Professional Baseball. He made one start for the Bluefish, taking the loss after allowing eight earned runs on seven hits with one strikeout over 2/3 of an inning. Martis was released by the team on June 1.

=== Lincoln Saltdogs ===
On June 6, 2015, Martis signed with the Lincoln Saltdogs of the American Association of Professional Baseball. In 17 games (16 starts) for Lincoln, he compiled a 6–3 record and 3.74 ERA with 79 strikeouts across 106 innings pitched. Martis became a free agent following the season.

On February 15, 2016, Martis re-signed with the Saltdogs. In 24 games (18 starts), he registered a 9–8 record and 3.34 ERA with 93 strikeouts over 121 1/3 innings pitched. Martis became a free agent after the season.

=== Baltimore Orioles ===
Following the 2017 World Baseball Classic, Martis signed a minor league contract with the Baltimore Orioles on April 6. In 8 games for the Triple-A Norfolk Tides, he had a 4.38 ERA with 8 strikeouts across 12 1/3 innings pitched. The Orioles organization released Martis on July 24.

=== Lincoln Saltdogs (second stint) ===
On July 27, 2017, Martis re-signed with the Lincoln Saltdogs. In 7 games (6 starts), he threw 40 1/3 innings with a 4–1 record, 2.01 ERA, and 32 strikeouts. On February 17, 2018, Martis re-signed with the Saltdogs, one of four Netherlands national team players to join the team. He was released by the team in late May but re-signed in June. In 25 games (2 starts), he accumulated a 3–5 record and 5.01 ERA with 32 strikeouts across 41 1/3 innings pitched. Martis returned to the Saltdogs in 2019. In 22 games (9 starts) for Lincoln, he struggled to a 2–7 record and 6.44 ERA with 38 strikeouts and 2 saves across 65 2/3 innings pitched. The Saltdogs released Martis on November 19.

=== Amsterdam Pirates ===
In February 2020, Martis signed with Amsterdam Pirates of the Honkbal Hoofdklasse. In 11 games, he had a 2.63 ERA, 16 strikeouts, and 1 save across 13 2/3 innings of relief. In 11 games (7 starts) in 2021, he posted a 6–0 record with a 0.91 ERA with 51 strikeouts over 49 1/3 innings pitched. Martis returned to Amsterdam for a third consecutive season in 2022. In 17 games (8 starts), he had a 6–1 record, 3 saves, 1.22 ERA, and 72 strikeouts across 73 2/3 innings of work.

=== Neptunus ===
After the 2022 season, Martis signed with the Neptunus of the Honkbal Hoofdklasse. In 17 starts for the Rotterdam team, he had an 8–3 record, 2.12 ERA, and 88 strikeouts across 101 2/3 innings pitched. In 2024, he tied for the league lead with 12 wins and was among the league leaders with a 1.53 ERA, 106 innings pitched, and 88 strikeouts. Martis led the league with 15 wins, 7 shutouts, and 117 2/3 innings pitched in 2025, also ranking in the top 10 in ERA and strikeouts. In 2026, he went 12–1 with a 2.25 ERA in 13 starts.

== International career ==
Martis has pitched for the Netherlands national team in international tournaments. He holds the World Baseball Classic (WBC) career record with 28 1/3 innings pitched. He pitched a no-hitter against Panama in the 2006 WBC, with the game on March 10 stopped after seven innings due to the mercy rule. He pitched for the Dutch in the WBC in 2013, 2017, 2023, and 2026. Over five tournaments, he has a 1.59 ERA in 10 games, allowing four of his five earned runs in 2013. (He was absent from the 2009 WBC because he was in spring training with the Washington Nationals, seeking a starting rotation spot.)

Martis went 0–2 with a 6.75 ERA in the 2008 Summer Olympics.

Martis was part of the Dutch team that won the 2011 Baseball World Cup, earning a win against Chinese Taipei and going 1–0 with a 1.35 ERA in two games. He played for the Netherlands in the European Championship in 2007, 2016, 2021, 2023, and 2025. He earned the win in the 2025 championship game.

Martis pitched once for the Netherlands in the Africa/Europe 2020 Olympic Qualification tournament. He pitched in the first three editions of the WBSC Premier12 in 2015, 2019, and 2024 and in the 2022, 2024, and 2026 Haarlem Baseball Week.

== Personal life ==
Martis is married and has a son. They reside in Leiden, South Holland.

Martis began playing baseball as a seven year old.
