= UTC+00:20 =

Former time zone

- Time zone

UTC offset
- UTC: UTC+00:20

Current time
- 02:31, 25 March 2025 UTC+00:20 [refresh]

Central meridian
- 5 degrees E

Date-time group

UTC+00:20 is an identifier for a time offset from UTC of +00:20.

== History ==
UTC+00:20 was used in the Netherlands from 1 May 1909 to 16 May 1940. It was known as Amsterdam Time or Dutch Time.

The exact time zone was GMT +0h 19m 32.13s until 1 July 1937, when it was simplified to GMT +0h 20m. When Germany occupied the Netherlands in World War II, Berlin Time was adopted, and this has been retained ever since.

The reason for the specific offset of +0h 19m 32.13s was that the time zone was centered on the mean solar time of the Westertoren (4° 53' 01.95" E Longitude), the tower of the Westerkerk church in Amsterdam.

UTC+00:20 was also used as daylight saving time in the British colony Gold Coast between 1919 and 1942.
