= Sharlon Schoop =

Curaçaoan baseball player (born 1987)

- Shortstop
- Born: April 15, 1987 (age 39); Willemstad, Curaçao
- Bats: Right Throws: Right
- Stats at Baseball Reference
Medals
Men's baseball
Representing Netherlands
Baseball World Cup
Gold medal – first place	2011 Panama Coty	Team
Intercontinental Cup
Silver medal – second place	2010 Taichung	Team
European Championship
Gold medal – first place	2014 Brno	Team
Gold medal – first place	2019 Bonn	Team
Gold medal – first place	2021 Turin	Team
Bronze medal – third place	2023 Czechia	Team
Gold medal – first place	2025 Rotterdam	Team
France International Tournament
Gold medal – first place	2014 Sénart	Team

Sharlon Romans Emederio Schoop (born April 15, 1987) is a Dutch-Curaçaoan professional baseball shortstop. He played for several organizations in Minor League Baseball and for the Amsterdam Pirates of the Honkbal Hoofdklasse. He played for the Netherlands national team in many international baseball tournaments, including the World Baseball Classic and WBSC Premier12.

== Professional career ==
=== San Francisco Giants ===
Schoop signed with the San Francisco Giants as an undrafted free agent on March 30, 2004. He played in the Giants minor league system from 2005 to 2011, reaching as high as the Double-A Richmond Flying Squirrels in 2010. On November 2, 2011, Schoop elected free agency.

=== Kansas City Royals ===
On November 25, 2011, Schoop signed a minor league contract with the Kansas City Royals. He spent the 2012 season with the Double-A Northwest Arkansas Naturals, slashing .267/.341/.436 with 7 home runs and 19 RBI in 50 games. He did not play in a game in 2013 due to injury, spending the entire season on the disabled list. He elected free agency on November 4.

=== Baltimore Orioles ===
The Baltimore Orioles signed Schoop to a minor league contract on November 21, 2013.

Schoop spent the 2014 season with the Double-A Bowie Baysox, hitting .217/.288/.300 with 3 home runs and 25 RBI in 77 games. He split 2015 between Bowie and the Triple-A Norfolk Tides, hitting a combined .219/.280/.263 in 81 games.

Schoop came to Baltimore in June 2016 in case the team needed to add him to the roster during the suspension of infielder Manny Machado, but he was never officially recalled off the taxi squad and was later sent back to Norfolk. He elected free agency following the season on November 7.

On January 26, 2017, Schoop re-signed with the Orioles on a minor league contract. In 36 games split between Bowie and Norfolk, he batted .225/.289/.432 with 5 home runs and 10 RBI. Schoop elected free agency following the season on November 6.

On February 20, 2018, Schoop again re-signed to a minor league deal with Baltimore. He played in 36 games in 2018, again split between Bowie and Norfolk, hitting a combined .221/.317/.327 with two home runs and 18 RBI. Schoop elected free agency following the season on November 2.

=== International teams ===
On May 25, 2019, Schoop signed with the Amsterdam Pirates of the Honkbal Hoofdklasse. He played 19 games for the club in 2019, slashing .357/.427/.486 with 1 home run and 15 RBI. Schoop played in 15 games for the team in 2020, batting a torrid .350/.451/.600 with 2 home runs and 17 RBI. With Schoop, the Pirates won the Holland Series in 2019 and 2021.

Schoop played for the Curaçao Suns in the 2023 Caribbean Series as well as the 2024 Caribbean Series in Miami.

== International career ==
Schoop has played for the Netherlands national baseball team in more than 100 international games. He was on the Dutch roster for 2009, 2017, and 2023 World Baseball Classic tournaments.

He also played for the Netherlands in the 2019 European Baseball Championship, the Africa/Europe 2020 Olympic Qualification tournament in Italy in September 2019, and at the 2019 WBSC Premier12 and 2024 WBSC Premier12. He represented the Netherlands at the 2023 European Baseball Championship.

== Personal life ==
Schoop's younger brother, Jonathan Schoop, also plays baseball, currently for the Dorados de Chihuahua of the Mexican League. They grew up in Santa Maria neighborhood in Willemstad, Curaçao.
