= Randolph Oduber =

Aruban baseball player (born 1989)

- Outfielder
- Born: March 18, 1989 (age 37); Paradera, Aruba
- Bats: Right Throws: Left
- Stats at Baseball Reference

Career highlights and awards
- WBSC Premier12 All-World Team (2015)
Medals
Representing Netherlands
Men's baseball
European Baseball Championship
Gold medal – first place	2014 Brno	National team
Gold medal – first place	2016 Hoofddorp	National team
Gold medal – first place	2019 Bonn	National team
Haarlem Baseball Week
Gold medal – first place	2016 Haarlem	National team
France International Baseball Tournament
Gold medal – first place	2014 Sénart	National team
Gold medal – first place	2016 Sénart	National team

Randolph F. Oduber (born March 18, 1989) is an Aruban former professional baseball outfielder. He played in Minor League Baseball from 2009 to 2015. He also played for the Netherlands national team in international tournaments. He was named to the 2015 WBSC Premier12 All-World Team.

== Playing career ==
=== Washington Nationals ===
Oduber was originally drafted by the San Francisco Giants in the 48th round of the 2009 Major League Baseball draft, but he did not sign. The following draft, the Washington Nationals selected Oduber out of Western Oklahoma State College in the 32nd round. He made his professional debut for the Gulf Coast League Nationals and also played for the Single-A Hagerstown Suns, accumulating a .324/.387/.503 slash line between the two teams. He spent 2011 with the GCL Nationals and Hagerstown again, slashing .311/.373/.421 with 5 home runs and 26 RBI.

Oduber spent the 2012 season in High-A with the Potomac Nationals, hitting .252/.288/.383 in 80 games. He spent the majority of the 2013 season in Potomac, also appearing in 5 games for the Double-A Harrisburg Senators, and hit .232/.290/.337 with 4 home runs and 42 RBI. In 2014, Oduber played 1 game in Harrisburg, spending the rest of the year in Potomac, slashing .265/.301/.381 with career-highs in home runs (6) and RBI (51). He only appeared in 7 games for Harrisburg in 2016 due to injury, notching 3 hits in 16 at-bats. On April 2, 2016, Oduber was released by the Nationals organization.

=== Curaçao Neptunus ===
On May 21, 2016, Oduber signed with the Curaçao Neptunus of the Dutch Honkbal Hoofdklasse. Oduber posted a .353/.542/.412 batting line, but was limited to 8 games because of a hamstring injury.

=== Lincoln Saltdogs ===
On November 1, 2016, Oduber signed with the Lincoln Saltdogs of the American Association of Independent Professional Baseball. In 94 games in 2017, he slashed .286/.328/.482 with 17 home runs and 60 RBI. On January 4, 2018, Oduber re-signed with Lincoln.

=== Fargo-Moorhead RedHawks ===
On April 4, 2018, Oduber was traded to the Fargo-Moorhead RedHawks. Oduber collected 20 hits in 80 at-bats for the RedHawks in 21 games.

=== Lincoln Saltdogs (second stint) ===
On July 19, 2018, Oduber re-signed with the Lincoln Saltdogs. He finished the season with Lincoln, hitting .346/.408/.520 with 7 home runs and 50 RBI. On December 13, 2018, Oduber re-signed with Lincoln. In 2019 for the Saltdogs, he slashed .284/.329/.410 with 9 home runs and 41 RBI in 79 games. Oduber was released on November 19, 2019.

=== Unipol Bologna ===
On September 24, 2020, Oduber signed with the Unipol Bologna of the Italian Baseball League. He appeared in 8 games for the club, posting 9 hits in 31 at-bats, including 2 home runs.

=== Hoofddorp Pioniers ===
On April 20, 2021, Oduber signed with the Hoofddorp Pioniers of the Honkbal Hoofdklasse. In 31 appearances for the team, Oduber batted .321/.429/.404 with two home runs, 13 RBI, and three stolen bases.

== International career ==
Oduber played for Team Netherlands in the 2013 World Baseball Classic, 2014 European Baseball Championship, 2014 France International Baseball Tournament, 2015 WBSC Premier12, 2016 Haarlem Baseball Week, 2016 France International Baseball Tournament, and the 2016 European Championship. He played for the Netherlands in the 2019 European Baseball Championship and the Africa/Europe 2020 Olympic Qualification tournament in Italy in September 2019.

Oduber was named to the 2015 WBSC Premier12 All-World Team, leading the tournament with 4 stolen bases.

Oduber was the first base coach for the Netherlands national under-18 team at the 2023 U-18 Baseball World Cup.
