= Curt Smith (baseball) =

Dutch baseball player (born 1986)

- First baseman
- Born: September 9, 1986 (age 39); Willemstad, Curaçao, Netherlands Antilles
- Bats: Right Throws: Right
- Stats at Baseball Reference

Career highlights and awards
- Baseball World Cup MVP (2011)
Medals
Men's baseball
Representing Netherlands
Baseball World Cup
Gold medal – first place	2011 Panama City	National team
Intercontinental Cup
Silver medal – second place	2010 Taichung	National team
European Baseball Championship
Gold medal – first place	2014 Brno	National team
Gold medal – first place	2016 Hoofddorp	National team
Gold medal – first place	2019 Bonn	National team
France International Baseball Tournament
Gold medal – first place	2014 Sénart	National team

Curt Sciene Smith (born September 9, 1986, in Willemstad, Curaçao, in the former Netherlands Antilles) is a Dutch former professional baseball first baseman. He also played for the Netherlands national team. He was drafted by the St. Louis Cardinals in the 39th round of the 2008 MLB draft after starring for the Maine Black Bears. He reached Double-A in the minors leagues. He played in independent baseball from 2015 to 2021.

== Career ==
Smith attended the University of Maine. He hit .403 and was named America East Conference Player of the Year in 2008, his final season for the Maine Black Bears. He was inducted into the school's hall of fame in 2014.

=== St. Louis Cardinals ===
Smith was selected by the St. Louis Cardinals in the 39th round (1,175th overall) of the 2008 MLB draft. In 2008, Smith played for the Rookie-level Johnson City Cardinals and the Single-A Quad Cities River Bandits. In 2009, he was assigned to the Single-A advanced Palm Beach Cardinals, and briefly spent time with the Double-A Springfield Cardinals. Smith spent the entire 2010 season with Springfield, and was named a mid-season All-Star. On April 3, 2011, Smith was released by the Cardinals organization. At the time of his release, Smith was a career .301/.336/.457 hitter in 260 minor league games.

=== Miami Marlins ===
After spending the remainder of the 2011 season with the Lincoln Saltdogs of the American Association, Smith signed a minor league contract with the Miami Marlins organization on December 16, 2011. He played for the Double-A Jacksonville Sunsin 2012, batting .261 with 9 home runs in 96 games, Smith elected free agency on November 2.

=== Minnesota Twins ===
On March 15, 2013, Smith signed a minor league contract with the Minnesota Twins organization. After hitting .231/.301/.367 with 4 home runs and 19 RBI in 45 games for the Twins' Double-A affiliate, the New Britain Rock Cats, he was released on July 4.

=== St. Louis Cardinals (second stint) ===
After spending the remainder of the 2013 season with the Lincoln Saltdogs, Smith signed a minor league contract with the Cardinals on January 18, 2014. Smith spent the season with the Double-A Springfield Cardinals, slashing .262/.322/.397 with 11 home runs and 52 RBI in 114 games.

=== Lincoln Saltdogs ===
On December 22, 2014, Smith signed with the Lincoln Saltdogs. In 2015, Smith played in 87 games for Lincoln, posting a .294/.358/.492 slash with 12 home runs and 61 RBI. On July 31, 2016, Smith re-signed with the Saltdogs for his fourth season with the team. He played in 82 games, posting a .331/.403/.548 batting line with 17 home runs and 60 RBI. For the 2017 season, Smith played in 95 games for Lincoln, slashing .322/.424/.474 with 11 home runs and 62 RBI. On December 21, 2017, Smith again re-signed with the Saltdogs. In 2018, Smith logged a .315/.367/.548 batting line with 18 home runs and 74 RBI in 92 games. In 2019, Smith appeared in 95 games for the Saltdogs, recording a .288/.344/.465 slash line with 14 home runs and 58 RBI.

On November 25, 2019, Smith once again re-signed with the Saltdogs, however he did not play in 2020 due to the COVID-19 pandemic. On February 10, 2021, Smith rejoined the Saltdogs for the 2021 season, his eighth season with the club. In a July 4 game against the Kansas City Monarchs, Smith hit a 2-run home run that made him become the all-time home run leader in franchise history. The shot was his 91st home run with the Saltdogs. He finished the season batting .280/.363/.480 with 10 home runs and 51 RBIs over 88 games. Smith retired from professional baseball following the season on October 19, 2021.

== International career ==
Smith played for the Netherlands national team in many international competitions, including the 2009, 2013, and 2017 World Baseball Classic. He was named MVP of the 2011 Baseball World Cup and the 2014 European Baseball Championship, both of which the Dutch won.

He played for the Netherlands in the 2019 European Baseball Championship and Africa/Europe 2020 Olympic Qualification tournament in September 2019.
