= Yurendell DeCaster =

Curaçaoan baseball player (born 1979)

- Third baseman
- Born: September 26, 1979 (age 46); Brievengat, Curaçao, Netherlands Antilles
- Batted: Right Threw: Right

MLB debut
- May 21, 2006, for the Pittsburgh Pirates

Last MLB appearance
- June 7, 2006, for the Pittsburgh Pirates

MLB statistics
- Batting average: .000
- Home runs: 0
- Runs batted in: 0
- Stats at Baseball Reference

Teams
- Pittsburgh Pirates (2006)
Medals
Men's baseball
Representing Netherlands
European Baseball Championship
Gold medal – first place	2003 Netherlands	National team
Gold medal – first place	2007 Montjuïc	National team
Gold medal – first place	2014 Brno	National team
Gold medal – first place	2016 Hoofddorp	National team
Gold medal – first place	2019 Bonn	National team
Haarlem Baseball Week
Gold medal – first place	2016 Haarlem	National team
World Port Tournament
Silver medal – second place	2015 Netherlands	National team
France International Baseball Tournament
Gold medal – first place	2014 Sénart	National team
Gold medal – first place	2016 Sénart	National team

Yurendell Eithel DeCaster (born September 26, 1979) is a Curaçaoan former professional baseball third baseman. He played in three games in Major League Baseball with the Pittsburgh Pirates in 2006. He played for the Netherlands national team in many tournaments, including the 2004 and 2008 Summer Olympics, four World Baseball Classics, and other international tournaments.

== Professional career ==
Originally signed by the Tampa Bay Devil Rays as a free agent in 1996, DeCaster was selected by the Pittsburgh Pirates from Tampa Bay in the minor league phase of the 2000 Rule 5 draft.

He spent the entire 2005 season with Triple-A Indianapolis Indians, where he hit .280 with 11 home runs and 61 runs batted in, and also led his club in games played (122) and doubles (31). He primarily played in the outfield, but also played first, second, and third base.

He had a productive 2005–2006 winter league season playing for the Caribes de Anzoátegui of the Venezuelan Winter League, where he batted .325 with 17 home runs and 47 RBI in 60 games. His 17 home runs tied him with Tom Evans for the league lead.

In 2006, DeCaster returned to Indianapolis, where he spent most of the season. In 119 games with the Indians, he batted .273 with 11 home runs and 51 RBI. He was called up to the Pirates twice, from May 21–24 and June 5–13, and appeared in three games. He struck out in both of his major league at-bats. He pinch hit twice and pinch ran once for the Pirates, never playing defense in the major leagues.

The Pirates released DeCaster on December 7, 2006, but came back to the Pirates in 2007, spending the season in Indianapolis. DeCaster became a free agent on October 29, 2007.

On November 27, 2007, DeCaster signed a minor league contract with the Washington Nationals with an invitation to spring training. He was assigned to the Double-A Harrisburg Senators to begin the season, then was promoted to the Triple-A Columbus Clippers in April 19. He hit a combined .262 with 14 home runs and 104 strikeouts in 104 games in the Nationals' system. He again became a free agent at the end of the season.

In December 2008, DeCaster signed a minor league contract with the Detroit Tigers but was released on April 1, 2009.

He began the 2009 season with the Fargo-Moorhead RedHawks of the independent Northern League. On June 29, DeCaster's contract was purchased by the New York Yankees, who assigned him to the Triple-A Scranton/Wilkes-Barre Yankees. He was released on September 2.

He played with the Reynosa Broncos of the Mexican Baseball League in 2010 and 2011, batting .339 in 101 games in his Mexican debut. He spent most of 2012 with the independent Winnipeg Goldeyes of the American Association, playing for one week in June with the Olmecas de Tabasco in Mexico. His team won the American Association championship, as the Goldeyes swept Fargo-Moorhead in the first round, 3 games to 0, and did the same with the Wichita Wingnuts in the championship, 3 games to 0.

In the 2012–13 winter league season, he played Tigres de Chinandega in Nicaragua and won the Triple Crown, hitting .417 with 13 home runs and 56 RBI.

DeCaster started 2013 with the Acereros de Monclova in Mexico before returning to Winnipeg in August. He hit for a combined .315 average in 94 games for both teams, including 13 homers, 64 RBI, and a .461 slugging percentage.

He briefly played for Pirates de Campeche in the Mexican League in 2015. He hit .226 with 2 home runs in 14 games in June and July.

== International career ==
Like many baseball players born in Curaçao, DeCaster played for the Netherlands national team in international baseball. He played in more than 100 games for the Netherlands, beginning in 2003.

DeCaster hit three home runs in the 2004 Summer Olympic Games, tying for the most home runs in the games. He hit .214 as the Dutch won only two of seven games and didn't qualify for the medal round. He returned to the Olympics in 2008, batting .167 with two doubles in seven games.

DeCaster also played for the Netherlands in the World Baseball Classic during the 2006, 2009, 2013, and 2017 tournaments. In 2009, he lined a ball hard off of first baseman Willy Aybar, who was charged with an error on the play, to drive in the winning run in the bottom of the 11th inning against the Dominican Republic team, securing the Netherlands a second-round berth in Pool 2. He hit .217 in 6 tournament games in 2009. In 2017, he hit .353 in five games, including a home run against Cuba.

DeCaster was on the preliminary roster for the 2009 Baseball World Cup. He also was named to the Dutch roster for the 2014 France International Baseball Tournament, 2014 European Baseball Championship, 2015 World Port Tournament, 2015 WBSC Premier12, 2016 Haarlem Baseball Week, 2016 France International Baseball Tournament, the 2016 European Baseball Championship, the 2019 European Baseball Championship, the Africa/Europe 2020 Olympic Qualification tournament, and 2019 WBSC Premier12.

== Personal life ==
DeCaster started playing baseball when he was five years old. His father played baseball and his mother played softball.

DeCaster's nephew played for Curaçao in the 2022 Little League World Series.

After retiring from professional baseball, DeCaster became a coach at the Baseball Academy in Curaçao and helped develop young prospects who signed with MLB clubs.
