= Jakub Sládek =

Czech baseball player (born 1990)

Kotlářka Praha
- First baseman
- Born: 17 February 1990 (age 36); Prague, Czech Republic
- Bats: Left Throws: Right
- Stats at Baseball Reference

Jakub Sládek (born February 17, 1990) is a Czech professional baseball first baseman for the Kotlářka Praha of the Czech Baseball Extraliga.

== Career ==
=== Philadelphia Phillies ===
On June 23, 2009, Sládek signed with the Philadelphia Phillies organization. He made nine appearances for the rookie-level Gulf Coast League Phillies, going 3-for-16 (.188) with three walks. Sládek would not return to the organization following the season.

=== Ishikawa Million Stars ===
In 2012, Sládek played for the Ishikawa Million Stars of the Baseball Challenge League.

== International career ==
He was selected for the Czech Republic national baseball team at the 2009 Baseball World Cup, 2010 European Baseball Championship, 2010 Intercontinental Cup, 2012 European Baseball Championship, 2013 World Baseball Classic Qualification, 2014 European Baseball Championship, 2015 Summer Universiade, 2015 USA Tour, 2017 World Baseball Classic Qualification, and 2016 European Baseball Championship.

And also he selected for the All Euro at the 2015 exhibition games against Japan.
