= Sebastiano Poma =

Italian baseball player (born 1993)

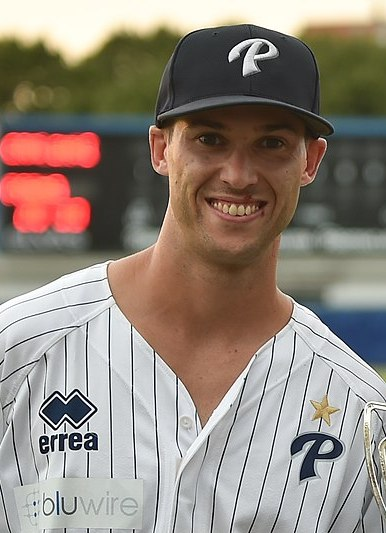

Parma Baseball – No. 26
- Outfielder
- Born: 13 June 1993 (age 33); Parma, Italy
- Bats: Left Throws: Left
- Stats at Baseball Reference
Medals
Men's baseball
Representing Italy
European Baseball Championship
Silver medal – second place	2019 Bonn	National team
Bronze medal – third place	2016 Hoofddorp	National team

Sebastiano Poma (born 13 June 1993) is an Italian professional baseball outfielder for Parma Baseball of the Italian Serie A.

Poma played for the Italy national baseball team at the 2017 World Baseball Classic and the 2019 European Baseball Championship. He played for the team at the Africa/Europe 2020 Olympic Qualification tournament, in Italy in September 2019.
