= 1993 Intercontinental Cup (baseball) =

1993 IBAF Intercontinental Cup

Tournament details
- Country: Italy
- Dates: 23 June – 4 July
- Teams: 10

Final positions
- Champions: Cuba (7th title)
- Runners-up: United States
- Third place: Japan
- Fourth place: Nicaragua

The 1993 IBAF Intercontinental Cup was the 11th edition of the baseball Intercontinental Cup. It was held in Italy from 23 June to 4 July in nine host cities: Macerata, Rimini, Bologna, Verona, Novara, Modena, Reggio Emilia, Milan and Parma.

The tournament, sanctioned by the International Baseball Federation, was contested between ten national teams: hosts Italy, Australia, Cuba, France, Japan, Mexico, Nicaragua, South Korea, Spain and United States. Cuba claimed the championship, defeating the United States in the final, while Japan secured the bronze medal by defeating Nicaragua.

== Opening round ==
Pos	Team	Pld	W	L	RF	RA	RD	PCT	GB	Qualification
1	Cuba	9	9	0	82	10	+72	1.000	—	Advance to Knockout stage
2	Japan	9	8	1	81	21	+60	.889	1	Advance to Knockout stage
3	United States	9	6	3	61	31	+30	.667	3	Advance to Knockout stage
4	Nicaragua	9	5	4	42	24	+18	.556	4	Advance to Knockout stage
5	South Korea	9	5	4	56	32	+24	.556	4	
6	Australia	9	5	4	41	46	−5	.556	4	
7	Mexico	9	3	6	36	60	−24	.333	6	
8	Italy (H)	9	2	7	41	57	−16	.222	7	
9	Spain	9	2	7	23	90	−67	.222	7	
10	France	9	0	9	25	117	−92	.000	9	

Source: IBAF
(H) Hosts

== Knockout stage ==
Semifinals
Cuba	10
Nicaragua	1
Japan	3
United States	6

Final
Cuba	9
United States	4
Bronze medal game
Nicaragua	0
Japan	9

=== Semifinals ===
3 July 1993; 15:30 (UTC+2)	United States	6 – 3	Japan	Nino Cavalli Stadium, Parma
3 July 1993; 15:30 (UTC+2)		Boxscore		Nino Cavalli Stadium, Parma

3 July 1993; 21:00 (UTC+2)	Nicaragua	1 – 10	Cuba	Nino Cavalli Stadium, Parma
3 July 1993; 21:00 (UTC+2)		Boxscore		Nino Cavalli Stadium, Parma

=== Bronze medal game ===
4 July 1993; 15:30 (UTC+2)	Japan	9 – 0	Nicaragua	Nino Cavalli Stadium, Parma
4 July 1993; 15:30 (UTC+2)		Boxscore		Nino Cavalli Stadium, Parma

=== Final ===
4 July 1993; 21:00 (UTC+2)	United States	4 – 9	Cuba	Nino Cavalli Stadium, Parma
4 July 1993; 21:00 (UTC+2)		Boxscore		Nino Cavalli Stadium, Parma
