= Kalian Sams =

Dutch baseball player (born 1986)

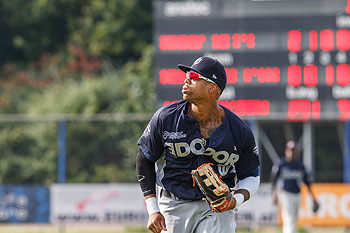
- Outfielder
- Born: 25 August 1986 (age 40); The Hague, Netherlands
- Bats: Right Throws: Right
- Stats at Baseball Reference
Medals
Men's baseball
Representing Netherlands
Baseball World Cup
Gold medal – first place	2011 Panama City	National team
Intercontinental Cup
Silver medal – second place	2006 Taichung	National team
European Baseball Championship
Gold medal – first place	2014 Brno	National team
Gold medal – first place	2016 Hoofddorp	National team
Gold medal – first place	2019 Bonn	National team
France International Baseball Tournament
Gold medal – first place	2014 Sénart	National team
Gold medal – first place	2016 Sénart	National team

Kalian Rivalino Sams (born 25 August 1986) is a Dutch former professional baseball outfielder who reached Triple-A in Minor League Baseball and played professionally in other countries. He also played more than 100 games for the Netherlands national team in international baseball tournaments.

== Professional career ==
=== ADO ===
Sams participated in the youth baseball academy with ADO in his hometown of The Hague. He debuted with the club's team in Dutch professional Honkbal Hoofdklasse in 2004. In 2006, he was the club's best hitter, batting .325 with 3 triples and 3 home runs, all of which were in the top 10 in the league.

=== Seattle Mariners ===
Sams signed a minor league contract with the Seattle Mariners on 2 July 2006. He said he was offered contracts by several American teams but chose the Mariners in part because fellow Dutch ballplayer Greg Halman had previously signed with the Mariners.

Sams made his American debut in 2007 with the Single-A Wisconsin Timber Rattlers but was demoted to the Everett Aquasox in June when the Short-Season A season began. He was teammates with Halman on both teams. In 104 games with both teams that season, Sams hit .216 with 11 home runs and 30 RBI.

Sams played in 2008 with the Advanced Rookie Pulaski Mariners. In 32 games, Sams hit .204 with 10 home runs and 20 RBI. Sams opened 2009 with the Single-A Clinton LumberKings and played 4 games with Everett before his season ended in late June. In 20 total games, Sams hit .208 with 4 home runs and 12 RBI.

Sams played most of the 2010 season with Clinton, but he was demoted to Everett in August. In 105 total games, he .183 with 20 home runs and 58 RBI. Sams began 2011 with the High A High Desert Mavericks but was demoted to Clinton in May. In 113 total games, he hit .231 with a career high 24 home runs and 66 RBI. In 2012, Sams was promoted to the Double-A Jackson Generals, where in 72 games he hit .242 with 11 home runs and 35 RBI.

Sams was away from the Mariners for much of spring training due to his participation in the 2013 World Baseball Classic. He suffered a hamstring injury upon rejoining the Mariners. The Mariners released Sams on 23 April 2013.

=== San Diego Padres ===
On 5 May 2013, Sams signed a minor league contract with the San Diego Padres. He began the minor league seasion with the Double-A San Antonio Missions. After hitting 10 home runs in 26 games, Sams was promoted in June to the Triple-A Tucson Padres, the highest level of affiliated baseball he would reach. However, his hot hitting did not continue. On 20 July, Sams was released by the Padres. In 50 games in the Padres organization, Sams hit .215 with 11 home runs and 30 RBI.

=== Camden Riversharks ===
On 3 August 2013, Sams signed with the Camden Riversharks of the Atlantic League, where he played in five games, hitting .667 with 3 home runs and 9 RBI.

=== Texas Rangers ===
Sams signed a minor league deal with the Texas Rangers on 10 August 2013. In 20 games with the Double-A Frisco RoughRiders, he hit .286 with 4 home runs and 10 RBI. He also played for Neptunus in the Hoofdklasse's postseason then for Algodoneros de Guasave in the Mexican Pacific Winter League.

Sams re-signed a minor league contract with the Rangers in November 2013. However, Texas released him on 23 March 2014, prior to the start of the 2014 season. He did not play in affiliated American baseball again.

=== Camden Riversharks (second stint) ===
On 8 April 2014, Sams re-signed with the Camden Riversharks. He played in 16 games for Camden in 2014, hitting .232 with 2 home runs. He became a free agent after the season.

=== Québec Capitales ===
Sams joined the Québec Capitales of the Can-Am League for the 2015 season. He batted .279/.374/.534 with 16 home runs, 65 RBI, and 32 stolen bases in 61 games and was named the team's most valuable player. Sams also appeared in five games for the Kinheim in the Dutch Honkbal Hoofdklasse, hitting .429.

=== Delfines de Ciudad del Carmen ===
On 24 February 2016, Sams signed with the Delfines de Ciudad del Carmen of the Mexican League. Sams appeared in seven games, getting seven hits but striking out 13 times in 26 at-bats before being released on 4 May 2016.

=== Québec Capitales (second stint) ===
After his Mexican League release, Sams returned to Canada, re-signing with the Québec Capitales. In 61 games in 2016, Sams slashed .277/.372/.504 with 12 home runs and 41 RBI. In 2017, again with Québec, Sams batted .291/.350/.593 with 23 home runs and a career-high 70 RBI. Sams also played in five games for the Amsterdam Pirates in the Hoofdklasse. In 2018 for Québec, Sams batted .311/.391/.500 with 11 home runs and 48 RBI, and appeared in three games for Amsterdam. In total, Sams played in 289 games for the Capitales from 2015 to 2018.

Upon his retirement, Sams said he rediscovered his love for baseball when he played in Canada.

=== High Point Rockers ===
On 21 March 2019, Sams signed with the High Point Rockers of the Atlantic League. He batted .203/.292/.297 before being released on 7 July 2019.

=== Sussex County Miners ===
On 13 July 2019, Sams signed with the Sussex County Miners of the Can-Am League. He hit .278/.353/.467 in 24 games before he was released on 15 August 2019.

=== Amsterdam Pirates ===
On 19 August 2019, Sams signed with the Amsterdam Pirates of the Honkbal Hoofdklasse, and played in 1 game for the club, going hitless in 2 plate appearances. Sams played in 20 games for Amsterdam in 2020, slashing .359/.516/.813 with 8 home runs and 27 RBI. He remained with the club to begin the 2021 season. He helped Amsterdam win the Holland Series in 2019 and 2021.

On 27 October 2022, Sams announced his retirement from professional baseball on Instagram. He said that his age and shoulder injuries contributed to his decision.

== International career ==
Sams played more than 100 games for the Netherlands national baseball team. He debuted with the national team in 2006 and played in the 2013 World Baseball Classic (WBC) and 2017 WBC. He helped the Dutch win the 2011 Baseball World Cup and European Baseball Championships in 2014, 2016, and 2019. He also played in the 2015 WBSC Premier12, 2019 WBSC Premier12, and Africa/Europe 2020 Olympic Qualification tournament.

== Personal life ==
Sams was born in the Netherlands and is of Curaçaoan descent. He has two children, one son and one daughter.

After his retirement, Sams developed an autobiographical theatre show called "The Devil's Home Run." He also became a motivational speaker.
