= Alessandro Vaglio =

Italian baseball player (born 1989)

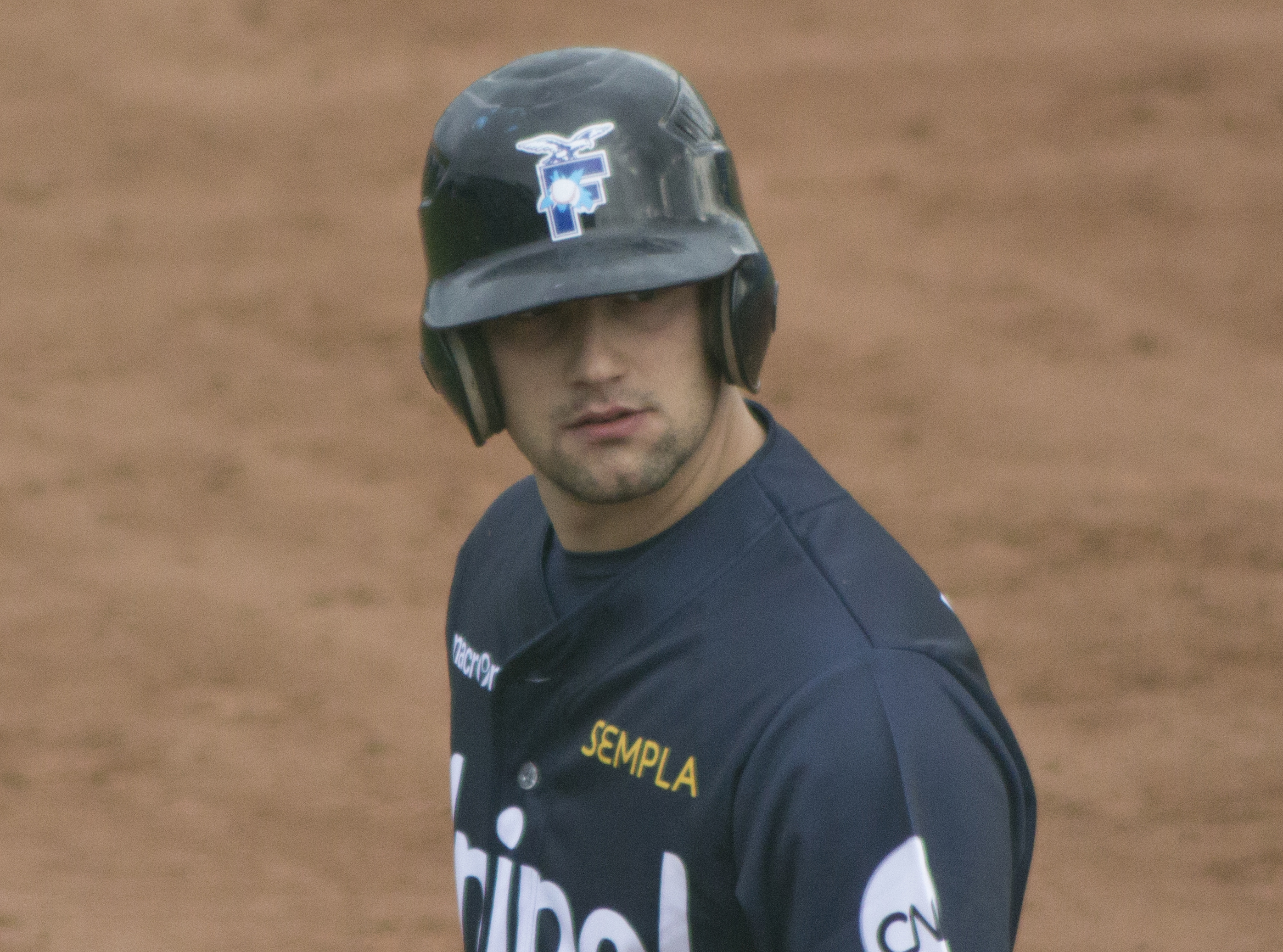

Fortitudo Baseball Bologna
- Infielder
- Born: January 28, 1989 (age 37); Montefiascone, Italy
- Bats: Right Throws: Right
- Stats at Baseball Reference
Medals
Men's baseball
Representing Italy
European Baseball Championship
Bronze medal – third place	2016 Hoofddorp	National team

Alessandro Vaglio (born January 28, 1989) is an Italian professional baseball infielder, for the Fortitudo Baseball Bologna in the Italian Baseball League.

He also played for the Italy national baseball team in the 2010 Intercontinental Cup, the 2013 World Baseball Classic, and the 2019 European Baseball Championship. He is playing for the team at the Africa/Europe 2020 Olympic Qualification tournament, taking place in Italy beginning September 18, 2019.
