= Ademar Rifaela =

Dutch-Curaçaoan baseball player (born 1994)

- Outfielder
- Born: 20 November 1994 (age 31); Willemstad, Curaçao
- Bats: Left Throws: Left
Medals
Men's baseball
Representing Netherlands
European Baseball Championship
Gold medal – first place	2019 Germany	Team
Bronze medal – third place	2023 Czech Republic	Team

Ademar Bertty Aloysius Rifaela (born 20 November 1994) is a Dutch-Curaçaoan professional baseball outfielder. After spending seven seasons in the Baltimore Orioles' minor leagues system, Rifaela has played in the Mexican League and in winter leagues in the Dominican Republic, Mexico, and Nicaragua. He represented the Netherlands at the 2019 and 2023 European Baseball Championships, winning the gold and bronze medals, respectively.

== Professional career ==
=== Baltimore Orioles ===
Rifaela signed with the Baltimore Orioles on 16 March 2013. He began his professional career in 2013 with the Dominican Summer League Orioles and advanced to the Gulf Coast League Orioles in 2014.

In 2015, he split the season between the Delmarva Shorebirds and the Aberdeen IronBirds, and in 2016 between Delmarva and the Frederick Keys. He spent the 2017 season with Frederick, where he was named Carolina League Most Valuable Player, batting .284 with a league-leading 24 home runs in 124 games.

Rifaela reached Double-A with the Bowie Baysox in 2018 and split the 2019 season between Bowie and the Triple-A Norfolk Tides. He elected free agency after the 2019 season.

=== Quick Amersfoort ===
On 12 August 2020, Rifaela joined Quick Amersfoort of the Dutch Honkbal Hoofdklasse.

=== Sioux City Explorers ===
On 23 March 2022, Rifaela signed with the Sioux City Explorers of the American Association of Professional Baseball. He batted .315/.377/.491 with 30 hits, 68 runs and 43 RBIs in 62 appearances.

=== Mexican League ===
On 29 December 2022, Rifaela signed with the Guerreros de Oaxaca of the Mexican League, ahead of the 2023 season. On 27 June 2023, he was traded to the Generales de Durango in exchange for Aneury Tavárez. He finished the season as the league RBI leader with 83 RBI in 90 games, appearing in 54 games for Oaxaca and 36 for Durango.

After appearing in 29 games during the 2024 season, Rifaela was released by the Generales on 3 June. On 8 June, he was signed by the Bravos de León but was released by the club on 14 July after 26 games.

=== Foreign leagues ===
Rifaela played for the Curaçao Suns in the 2024 Caribbean Series. He was named an All-Star in the Nicaraguan Professional Baseball League in late 2024.

In 2026, Rifaela began the season with Líderes de Miranda in the Venezuelan Major League before joining San Marino in the Italian Baseball League.

== International career ==
Rifaela represented the Netherlands at the 2019 European Baseball Championship, where his team won the tournament He appeared in all seven games for the Dutch team, recording 10 runs, 11 hits, one double, six home runs, 17 RBIs and a .407 batting average. He led the tournament in runs, home runs, and RBIs, and was named the most valuable player of the championship.

In 2023, Rifaela was part of the Dutch team that won the bronze medal at the 2023 European championship. He appeared in five games, recording three runs, eight hits, two doubles, one home run and a .333 batting average across 24 at bats.
