= Czech Republic national baseball team =

Information
- Country: Czech Republic
- Federation: Czech Baseball Association
- Confederation: WBSC Europe
- Manager: Pavel Chadim
- Captain: Martin Mužík
- Team Colors: Dark Blue, Red, White, Cream

WBSC ranking
- Current: 16 ▼1 (26 March 2026)
- Highest: 14 (2 times; latest in December 2021)
- Lowest: 25 (31 December 2012)

World Baseball Classic
- Appearances: 2 (first in 2023)
- Best result: 14th (2023)

World Cup
- Appearances: 2 (first in 2005)
- Best result: 18th (2005)

European Championship
- Appearances: 11 (first in 1997)
- Best result: (bronze) 3rd (1 time, in 2025)

The Czech Republic national baseball team (Czech: Česká mužská baseballová reprezentace) is the national baseball team of the Czech Republic. The team competes in the biennial European Baseball Championship, and debuted in the 2023 World Baseball Classic.

The team competed in the 2026 World Baseball Classic in March 2026.

== History ==
Logo prior to 2026

Czech clubs began playing against teams of United States Army servicemen in the immediate aftermath of World War II, but the development of the sport was halted after the rise of the Iron Curtain and would not resume until Bill Arce's baseball clinics in Prague, starting in 1969. It would not be until the 1980s that an official national team (for what was then Czechoslovakia) was formed; the team took three out of four games from the Soviet national team in Tbilisi, modern-day Georgia in October 1987.

The country became a full member of the Confederation of European Baseball in 1989, around the time of the Velvet Revolution. At the point of the dissolution of Czechoslovakia in 1993, the national team was almost entirely composed of Czech players. The Czech national team first qualified for the European Baseball Championship in 1997, with a record of 4–4. The team narrowly missed out on qualifying for the 2004 Summer Olympics in Athens, falling short of Italy and the Netherlands.

In 2009, Europe hosted the IBAF World Cup, the first time in history the Baseball World Cup was not hosted by a specific country. Prague hosted Group A of the pool round, and the Czech Republic team finished 20th, going 0–3 with losses to Australia, Mexico, and Chinese Taipei.

Because the Czech Republic finished in the top five in the 2019 European Baseball Championship, it moved on to the 2020 Olympics qualifiers in Italy in September 2019. There, it came in third, behind Israel and the Netherlands.

In 2026, following their World Baseball Classic appearance, the team rebranded with new uniforms, word fonts, and the addition of cream to the color scheme.

== Roster ==
Czech Republic roster – 2026 World Baseball Classic
Players		Coaches
Pitchers: 19 Jeff Barto; 14 Filip Čapka; 7 Tomáš Duffek; 63 Lukáš Ercoli; 88 Lukáš Hlouch; 3 Michal Kovala; 23 Ondrej Vank; 54 Boris Vecerka; 15 Marek Minařík; 18 Jan Novák; 42 Daniel Padyšák; 57 Tomas Ondra; 35 Ondřej Satoria; 13 Martin Schneider; 26 Filip Kollmann	Catchers: 55 Martin Červenka; 38 Martin Zelenka; 21 Matous Bubenik; Infielders: 30 Ryan Johnson; 78 Martin Cervinka; 77 Vojtěch Menšík; 49 Martin Mužík; 56 Milan Prokop; 27 Jan Pospisil; 6 Terrin Vavra; Outfielders: 5 William Escala; 97 Martin Krejcirik; 2 Max Prejda; 73 Marek Chlup; 11 Michal Sindelka	Manager: 13 Pavel Chadim; Coaches: 41 Joe Truesdale (Bench Coach); 22 John Hussey (Pitching Coach); 47 Alex Derhak (First Base Coach); 17 David Winkler (Third Base Coach); 25 Dusan Randak (Pitching Coach)

== Results and fixtures ==
The following is a list of professional baseball match results currently active in the latest version of the WBSC World Rankings, as well as any future matches that have been scheduled.

Legend

Win Lose Void or postponed Fixture

=== 2022 ===
Friendly	17 March	Czech Republic	15–2	France	Tenerife, Spain
Friendly			Boxscore

Friendly	22 June	Czech Republic	7–1	Greece	Prague, Czech Republic
Friendly			Boxscore

Friendly	24 June	Czech Republic	2–3	Spain	Prague, Czech Republic
Friendly			Boxscore

Friendly	6 September	Germany	1–0	Czech Republic	Prague, Czech Republic
Friendly			Boxscore

Friendly	7 September	Germany	2–3	Czech Republic	Prague, Czech Republic
Friendly			Boxscore

World Baseball Classic Q	17 September	Spain	21–7 (F/7)	Czech Republic	Regensburg, Germany
World Baseball Classic Q	13:00 CET	WP: Rogelio Armenteros; HR: Jesus Ustariz (1), Edison Valerio (1, 2)	Boxscore	LP: Marek Minarik; HR: Vojtech Mensik (1), Marek Chlup (1), Matej Mensik (1), Martin Muzik (1)	Attendance: 1,725; Umpires: Darius Ghani (HP), Mark Winters (1B), Roberto LaMadrid (2B), John Byrne (3B)

World Baseball Classic Q	18 September	France	1–7	Czech Republic	Regensburg, Germany
World Baseball Classic Q	13:00 CET	LP: Marc-Andre Habeck (0-1)	Boxscore	WP: Lukas Ercoli (1-0); HR: Vojtech Mensik (2)	Attendance: 911; Umpires: Mark Winters (HP), Roberto LaMadrid (1B), Kyohei Makita (2B), Young Chou Kwon (3B)

World Baseball Classic Q	20 September	Czech Republic	8–4	Germany	Regensburg, Germany
World Baseball Classic Q	13:00 CET	WP: Daniel Padysak (1-0); Sv: Michal Kovala (1); HR: Peter Zyma (1), Martin Cervenka (1, 2)	Boxscore	LP: Michael Bienlien (0-1); HR: William Germaine (1)	Attendance: 1,102; Umpires: Kyohei Makita (HP), Tyler Jones (1B), Mark Winters (2B), Darius Gahni (3B)

World Baseball Classic Q	21 September	Czech Republic	3–1	Spain	Regensburg, Germany
World Baseball Classic Q	19:00 CET	WP: Martin Schneider; Sv: Marek Minarik (1); HR: Martin Muzik (1), Marek Chlup (1)	Boxscore	LP: Ronald Medrano	Attendance: 1,229; Umpires: HP: Roberto LaMadrid, 1B: Darius Ghani, 2B: Young Chou Kwon, 3B: Jon Byrne.

=== 2023 ===
World Baseball Classic GS	10 March	Czech Republic	8–5	China	Tokyo, Japan
World Baseball Classic GS	12:00 JT	WP: Marek Minarik (1–0); HR: Matej Mensik (1), Martin Muzik (1)	Boxscore	LP: Hai-Cheng Gong (0–1)	Umpires: HP - Chan-Jung Chang, 1B - Pat Hoberg, 2B - Ben May, 3B - Fabrizio Fabrizzi

World Baseball Classic GS	11 March	Czech Republic	2–10	Japan	Tokyo, Japan
World Baseball Classic GS	19:00 JT	LP: Ondřej Satoria (0–1)	Boxscore	WP: Rōki Sasaki (1–0); Sv: Hiroya Miyagi (1); HR: Shugo Maki (2)	Attendance: 41,637; Umpires: HP: Ben May, 1B: Ramon De Jesus, 2B: Cuti Suárez, 3B: Fabrizio Fabrizzi

World Baseball Classic GS	12 March	Czech Republic	3–7	South Korea	Tokyo, Japan
World Baseball Classic GS	12:00 JT	LP: Lukas Ercoli (0–1)	Boxscore	WP: Park Se-woong (1–0); Sv: Lee Yong-chan (1); HR: Ha-seong Kim (2)	Umpires: HP – Delfin Colon, 1B – Laz Diaz, 2B – Fabrizio Fabrizzi, 3B – Ben May

World Baseball Classic GS	13 March	Australia	8–3	Czech Republic	Tokyo, Japan
World Baseball Classic GS	12:00 JT	WP: Daniel McGrath (1–0); HR: Alex Hall (2)	Boxscore	LP: Marek Minařík (1–1)	Umpires: HP: Ramon De Jesus. 1B: Delfin Colon. 2B: Laz Díaz. 3B: Fabrizio Fabrizzi.

Friendly	22 June	Czech Republic	13–5	Austria	Prague, Czech Republic
Friendly			Boxscore

Friendly	15 September	Czech Republic	0–1	Netherlands	Rotterdam, Netherlands
Friendly			Boxscore

Friendly	16 September	Netherlands	0–6	Czech Republic	Rotterdam, Netherlands
Friendly			Boxscore

Friendly	17 September	Czech Republic	1–6	Netherlands	Rotterdam, Netherlands
Friendly			Boxscore

Friendly	21 September	Italy	7–1	Czech Republic	Brno, Czech Republic
Friendly			Boxscore

Friendly	22 September	Czech Republic	5–3	Italy	Brno, Czech Republic
Friendly			Boxscore

=== 2024 ===
Friendly	16 August	Germany	6–8	Czech Republic	Třebíč, Czech Republic
Friendly			Boxscore

Friendly	17 August	Czech Republic	2–5	Germany	Třebíč, Czech Republic
Friendly			Boxscore

Friendly	18 August	Germany	7–5	Czech Republic	Třebíč, Czech Republic
Friendly			Boxscore

Friendly	19 October	Switzerland	2–10	Czech Republic	Prague, Czech Republic
Friendly			Boxscore

Friendly	November 9	Czech Republic	1–7	Japan	Nagoya, Japan
Friendly	19:06 JT	LP: Jan Tomek	Boxscore	WP: Hiroto Saiki; HR: Ryosuke Tatsumi (1)	Attendance: 33,758

Friendly	November 10	Japan	9–0	Czech Republic	Nagoya, Japan
Friendly	19:08 JT	WP: Takahisa Hayakawa; HR: Shota Morishita (1)	Boxscore	LP: Ondřej Satoria	Attendance: 23,223

=== 2025 ===
Prague Baseball Week GS	27 June	Italy	2–15 (F/8)	Czech Republic	Prague, Czech Republic
Prague Baseball Week GS	19:00 CET		Boxscore		Attendance: 841

Prague Baseball Week GS	28 June	Czech Republic	15–4 (F/7)	Austria	Prague, Czech Republic
Prague Baseball Week GS	19:00 CET		Boxscore		Attendance: 737

Prague Baseball Week GS	29 June	Germany	2–6	Czech Republic	Prague, Czech Republic
Prague Baseball Week GS	19:00 CET		Boxscore		Attendance: 913

Prague Baseball Week F	30 June	Germany	2–1	Czech Republic	Prague, Czech Republic
Prague Baseball Week F	19:00 CET		Boxscore		Attendance: 876

Friendly	31 July	Czech Republic	6–0	Germany	Regensburg, Germany
Friendly			Boxscore

Friendly	1 August	Czech Republic	15–5	Germany	Regensburg, Germany
Friendly			Boxscore

Friendly	2 August	Czech Republic	6–3	Germany	Regensburg, Germany
Friendly			Boxscore

Euro Championship GS	20 September	Czech Republic	1–8	Germany	Rotterdam, Netherlands
Euro Championship GS	14:00 CET		Boxscore		Attendance: 0

Euro Championship GS	21 September	Spain	1–9	Czech Republic	Rotterdam, Netherlands
Euro Championship GS	19:30 CET		Boxscore		Attendance: 200

Euro Championship GS	22 September	Sweden	0–10 (F/8)	Czech Republic	Rotterdam, Netherlands
Euro Championship GS	18:00 CET		Boxscore		Attendance: 332

Euro Championship QF	25 September	Israel	3–4	Czech Republic	Rotterdam, Netherlands
Euro Championship QF	14:00 CET		Boxscore		Attendance: 93

Euro Championship SF	26 September	Italy	8–5	Czech Republic	Rotterdam, Netherlands
Euro Championship SF	15:00 CET		Boxscore		Attendance: 953

Euro Championship 3rd	27 September	Czech Republic	9–2	Spain	Rotterdam, Netherlands
Euro Championship 3rd	14:00 CET		Boxscore		Attendance: 1,600

=== 2026 ===
World Baseball Classic GS	5 March	Czech Republic	4–11	South Korea	Tokyo, Japan
World Baseball Classic GS	19:00 JST	LP: Daniel Padyšák; HR: Terrin Vavra	Boxscore	WP: So Hyeong-jun; HR: Moon Bo-gyeong, Shay Whitcomb (2), Jahmai Jones	Attendance: 19,920; Umpires: David Rackley

World Baseball Classic GS	6 March	Australia	5–1	Czech Republic	Tokyo, Japan
World Baseball Classic GS	12:00 JST	WP: Josh Hendrickson; HR: Curtis Mead, Alex Hall	Boxscore	LP: Tomáš Ondra	Attendance: 21,514; Umpires: Ryan Additon

World Baseball Classic GS	7 March	Chinese Taipei	14–0 (F/7)	Czech Republic	Tokyo, Japan
World Baseball Classic GS	12:00 JST	WP: Chen Zhong-Ao Zhuang; HR: Stuart Fairchild	Boxscore	LP: Jan Novák	Attendance: 40,522; Umpires: Ruben Ramos

World Baseball Classic GS	10 March	Czech Republic	0–9	Japan	Tokyo, Japan
World Baseball Classic GS	19:00 JST	LP: Michal Kovala	Boxscore	WP: Yumeto Kanemaru; HR: Ukyo Shuto, Munetaka Murakami	Attendance: 42,340; Umpires: Ryan Additon

WBSC Premier12 Q	26 November	Czech Republic	v	China	Zhongshan, China
WBSC Premier12 Q	18:30 CST

WBSC Premier12 Q	27 November	Czech Republic	v	Nicaragua	Zhongshan, China
WBSC Premier12 Q	12:00 CST

WBSC Premier12 Q	28 November	Great Britain	v	Czech Republic	Zhongshan, China
WBSC Premier12 Q	12:00 CST

== International tournament results ==
=== World Baseball Classic ===
World Baseball Classic record							Qualification record			
Year	Round	Position	W	L	RS	RA	W	L	RS	RA
2006	did not enter						No qualifiers held			
2009	did not enter						No qualifiers held			
2013	did not qualify						0	2	6	28
2017	did not qualify						1	2	22	12
(Japan) 2023	Round 1	15th	1	3	16	30	3	1	25	27
(Japan) 2026	Round 1	19th	0	4	5	39	Automatically Qualified			
Total	Round 1	2/6	1	7	21	69	4	5	60	67

Czech Republic World Baseball Classic Record by Opponent
Opponent	Tournaments met	W-L record	Largest victory		Largest defeat		Current streak
Opponent	Tournaments met	W-L record	Score	Tournament	Score	Tournament	Current streak
Australia	2	0-2	–		8–3	Japan 2023	L2
China	1	1-0	8–5	Japan 2023	–		W1
Chinese Taipei	1	0-1	–		14–0 (F/7)	Japan 2026	L1
Japan	2	0-2	–		9–0	Japan 2026	L2
South Korea	2	0-2	–		11–4	Japan 2026	L2
Overall	2	1–7	Against CHN		Against TPE		L7
Overall	2	1–7	8–5	Japan 2023	14–0 (F/7)	Japan 2026	L7

Czech Republic WBC Qualification Record by Opponent
Opponent	Tournaments met	W-L record	Largest victory		Largest defeat		Current streak
Opponent	Tournaments met	W-L record	Score	Tournament	Score	Tournament	Current streak
France	1	1-0	7–1	Germany 2023	–		W1
Germany	3	2-1	15–3 (F/8)	Mexico 2017	16–1 (F/6)	Germany 2013	W2
Great Britain	1	0-1	–		12–5	Germany 2013	L1
Mexico	1	0-1	–		2–1	Mexico 2017	L1
Nicaragua	1	0-1	–		7–6 (F/11)	Mexico 2017	L1
Spain	1	1-1	3–1	Germany 2023	21–7 (F/7)	Germany 2023	W1
Overall	3	4–5	Against GER		Against GER		W3
Overall	3	4–5	15–3 (F/8)	Mexico 2017	16–1 (F/6)	Germany 2013	W3

=== European Baseball Championship ===
Team Czech Republic competed at the 2019 European Baseball Championship, and came in fifth, behind Team Israel. Among the players who competed for it were Martin Červenka and Marek Minařík.

- 1997 : 7th
- 1999 : 8th
- 2001 : 5th
- 2003 : 6th
- 2005 : 5th
- 2007 : 12th
- 2010 : 7th
- 2012 : 5th
- 2014 : 4th
- 2016 : 5th
- 2019 : 5th
- 2021 : 5th
- 2023 : 5th
- 2025 : (bronze) 3rd

== See also ==
- Sport in the Czech Republic
  History of baseball outside the United States
  World Baseball Classic
