= Terrin Vavra =

American baseball player (born 1997)

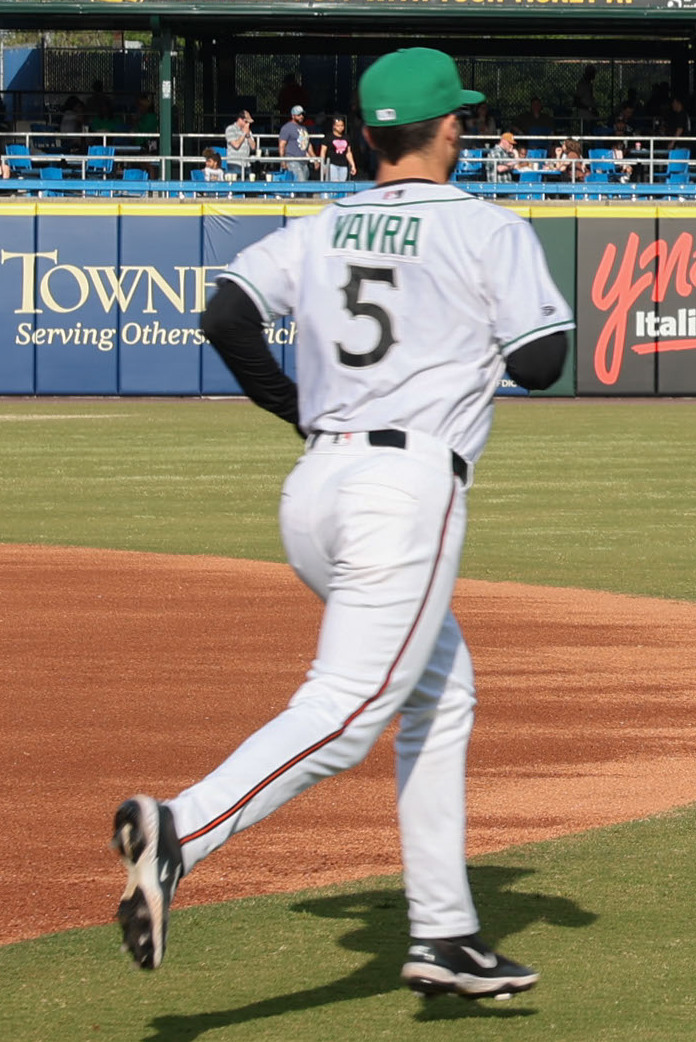
- Vavra with the Norfolk Tides in 2025
- Second baseman / Outfielder
- Born: May 12, 1997 (age 29); Menomonie, Wisconsin, U.S.
- Batted: Left Threw: Right

MLB debut
- July 29, 2022, for the Baltimore Orioles

Last MLB appearance
- August 2, 2025, for the Baltimore Orioles

MLB statistics
- Batting average: .252
- Home runs: 1
- Runs batted in: 17
- Stats at Baseball Reference

Teams
- Baltimore Orioles (2022–2023, 2025)

Terrin Thomas Vavra (born May 12, 1997) is an American former professional baseball second baseman and outfielder. He played in Major League Baseball (MLB) for the Baltimore Orioles.

== Amateur career ==
Vavra attended Menomonie High School in Menomonie, Wisconsin, where he played baseball and ice hockey. In 2015, his senior year, he earned All-State honors in baseball.

Undrafted in the 2015 Major League Baseball draft, Vavra enrolled at the University of Minnesota, where he played college baseball for the Minnesota Golden Gophers. In 2016, Vavra's freshman year at Minnesota, he appeared in 32 games (missing time due to a back injury), batting .358 with one home run and twenty RBIs. As a sophomore in 2017, he played in fifty games, hitting .308 with two home runs and 19 RBIs. That summer, he played in the Cape Cod Baseball League with the Cotuit Kettleers. In 2018, his junior season, Vavra was a unanimous All-Big Ten First Team selection alongside earning First Team All American honors; for the year, he started 58 games in which he slashed .386/.455/.614 with ten home runs and 59 RBIs.

== Professional career ==
=== Colorado Rockies ===
Following the season, the Colorado Rockies selected Vavra in the third round of the 2018 Major League Baseball draft. Vavra signed with Colorado and made his professional debut with the Boise Hawks of the Low-A Northwest League (with whom he was named an All-Star), batting .302 with four home runs and 26 RBIs over 44 games. Vavra spent the 2019 season with the Asheville Tourists of the Single-A South Atlantic League, earning All-Star honors. He was named the SAL Player of the Month for June after hitting .350. Over 102 games, he slashed .318/.409/.489 with ten home runs, 52 RBIs, and 18 stolen bases, earning the title of SAL Most Valuable Player. Vavra did not play a minor league game in 2020 due to the cancellation of the minor league season caused by the COVID-19 pandemic.

=== Baltimore Orioles ===
On August 30, 2020, the Rockies traded Vavra, Tyler Nevin and a player to be named later (later revealed to be Mishael Deson) to the Baltimore Orioles for Mychal Givens. For the 2021 season, he was assigned to the Bowie Baysox of the Double-A Northeast. He was on the injured list for nearly two months with a back injury. Over 40 games with Bowie, Vavra batted .248 with five home runs and 20 RBI.

On November 19, 2021, the Orioles selected Vavra's contract and added him to their 40-man roster to protect him from the Rule 5 draft. He began the 2022 season with the Norfolk Tides of the Triple-A International League. After 13 games, he was placed on the injured list with a hamstring strain. He returned to play in early June.

On July 26, 2022, the Orioles promoted Vavra to the major leagues for the first time. He made his MLB debut on July 29. On August 1, Vavra recorded his first career hit, an infield single off of Texas Rangers starter Jon Gray. On October 5, the final day of the season, Vavra hit a three–run home run off of Mitch White for his first career home run. The blast propelled the Orioles to a 5–4 victory over the Toronto Blue Jays.

In 2023, Vavra played in 27 games for the Orioles, batting .245/.315/.245 with five RBI. While playing for Triple–A Norfolk, he suffered a right shoulder strain and was placed on the injured list on June 17, 2023. He was pulled off of his rehab assignment on September 7 to undergo further testing on his shoulder, and was transferred to the 60–day injured list on September 14. On November 14, Vavra was removed from the 40–man roster and sent outright to the Triple-A Norfolk Tides.

Vavra began the 2024 campaign with Norfolk, hitting .269 with two home runs and 19 RBI across 31 games. On July 30, 2024, the Orioles selected Vavra's contract, adding him to their active roster. He was designated for assignment without appearing in the majors for Baltimore on August 21.

=== Seattle Mariners ===
On August 23, 2024, Vavra was claimed off waivers by the Seattle Mariners. In three games for the Triple–A Tacoma Rainiers, he went 2–for–11 (.182) with two RBI. Vavra was designated for assignment by Seattle on August 31. He cleared waivers and elected free agency on September 5.

=== Baltimore Orioles (second stint) ===
On September 7, 2024, Vavra signed a minor league contract with the Baltimore Orioles organization. He spent the remainder of the year with the Triple-A Norfolk Tides. Vavra elected free agency following the season on November 4.

On February 5, 2025, Vavra re-signed with the Orioles organization on a new minor league contract. In 22 appearances for Triple-A Norfolk, he batted .317/.388/.450 with one home run, seven RBI, and three stolen bases. On May 24, the Orioles selected Vavra's contract, adding him to their active roster. He did not appear for Baltimore, and was designated for assignment the following day. Vavra cleared waivers and was sent outright to Norfolk on May 28. On August 1, the Orioles added Vavra back to their active roster. He appeared in one game, going 0-1 and playing two innings at second base without fielding a ball and was designated for assignment on August 3. Vavra cleared waivers and was sent outright to Triple-A Norfolk on August 5. He elected free agency on September 29.

=== Piratas de Campeche ===
On April 14, 2026, Vavra signed with the Piratas de Campeche of the Mexican League. Vavra made five appearances for the Piratas, batting .368/.500/.421 with three RBI.

=== Colorado Rockies (second stint) ===
On April 28, 2026, Vavra signed a minor league contract with the Colorado Rockies. However he did not appear in a game with the organization.

== Coaching Career ==
On May 16, 2026, Vavra was hired as an assistant for the FCL Orioles the rookie-level affiliate of the Baltimore Orioles.

== International career ==
Vavra played for the Czech Republic national baseball team at the 2026 World Baseball Classic. He is of Czech descent through his great-grandfather.

== Personal life ==
Vavra's father, Joe Vavra, is a professional baseball coach. Vavra and his wife, Carlie, had their first child, a daughter, in August 2022.
