= Pavel Chadim =

Czech baseball player and manager (born 1971)

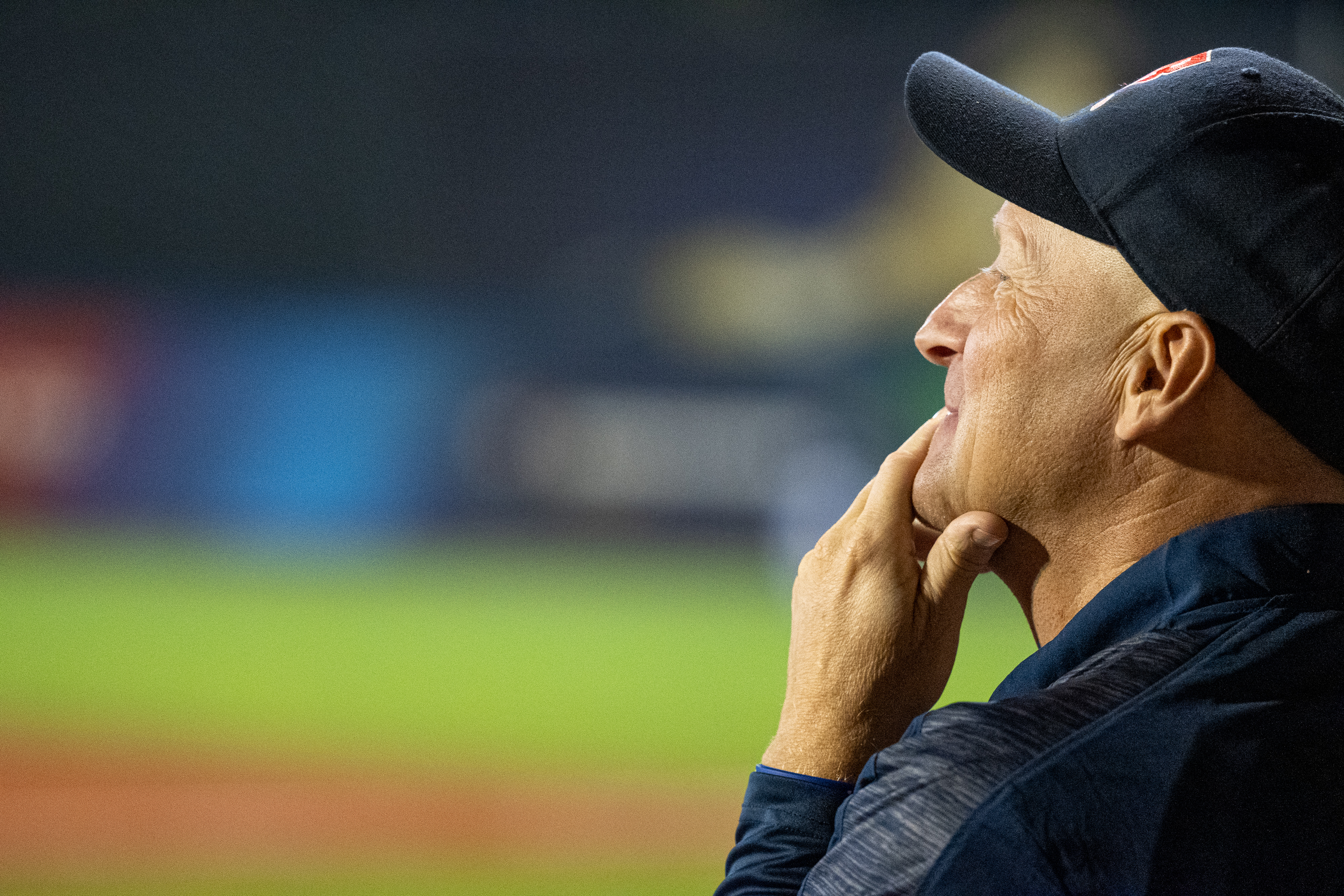
- Outfielder / manager
- Born: 8 July 1971 (age 55); Brno, Czechoslovakia
- Bats: Left Throws: Right
Medals
Men's baseball
Manager for Czech Republic
European Championship
Bronze medal – third place	2025 Rotterdam	Team

Pavel Chadim (born 8 July 1971) is a Czech baseball manager, former player, and physician who has led the Czech Republic national baseball team since 2021.

Chadim played as an outfielder and relief pitcher in the Czech Baseball Extraliga, debuting with for Technika Brno in 1993. He moved to Draci Brno in 1995, leading the team to ten consecutive league championships. He was part of the Czech squad that qualified for the European Baseball Championship for the first time in 1997. Chadim retired as a player in 2011. In eighteen seasons (including a single at-bat in 2021, at the age of 49), he accumulated a career slash line of .368/.426/.507.

Chadim first managed the Czech national team at the 2010 Intercontinental Cup. He also managed the U-21 national team at the 2012 European Championship and at the 2014 U-21 Baseball World Cup, earning a fifth-place finish. At the 2013 Little League World Series, he coached the Brno team, the first Czech team to appear at LLWS.

Chadim managed the Czech Republic at the 2023 World Baseball Classic, its first appearance in the tournament. After the 2023 European Baseball Championship, where Czechia finished fifth, Chadim's contract as manager of the national team was renewed through 2026. He also served as first base coach for Team Europe, under Marco Mazzieri, at the Global Baseball Games in Japan.

Outside of baseball, Chadim works as a neurologist, earning his MD from Masaryk University in Brno.

== See also ==
- Czech Baseball Extraliga
