= Time in the Czech Republic =

Time in Europe: Light Blue / Western European Time / Greenwich Mean Time (UTC); Blue / Western European Time / Greenwich Mean Time (UTC); Blue / Western European Summer Time / British Summer Time / Irish Standard Time (UTC+1); Red / Central European Time (UTC+1); Red / Central European Summer Time (UTC+2); Yellow / Eastern European Time / Kaliningrad Time (UTC+2); Ochre / Eastern European Time (UTC+2); Ochre / Eastern European Summer Time (UTC+3); Green / Moscow Time / Turkey Time (UTC+3); Turquoise / Armenia Time / Azerbaijan Time / Georgia Time / Samara Time (UTC+4); ▉▉▉▉ Pale colours: Standard time observed all year ▉▉▉ Dark colours: Summer time observed

The time zone in the Czech Republic is Central European Time (Středoevropský čas, SEČ: UTC+01:00) and Central European Summer Time (Středoevropský letní čas, SELČ: UTC+02:00). Daylight saving time is observed from the last Sunday in March (2:00 CET) to the last Sunday in October (3:00 CEST). The Czech Republic has observed Central European Time since 1979. Until 1993 when Czechoslovakia was separated into the Czech Republic and Slovakia, they also had Central European Time and Central European Summer Time. After the summer months, time in the Czech Republic is shifted back by one hour to Central European Time. Like most states in Europe, Summer time (daylight saving time) is observed in the Czech Republic, when time is shifted forward by one hour, two hours ahead of Greenwich Mean Time.

== IANA time zone database ==
In the IANA time zone database the republic is covered by Europe/Prague.

== See also ==
- List of time zones by country
- List of time zones by UTC offset
