= Nino Cavalli Stadium =

Baseball stadium in Parma, Italy

Coordinates: 44.793543°N 10.299768°E

Nino Cavalli Stadium is a baseball stadium located in Parma, Emilia Romagna, Italy. It is the home stadium of Parma Baseball of the Italian Baseball League.

== History ==
The baseball stadium was opened on 12 September 2009. It has a capacity of 3,000 people.

From September 18–22, 2019, the stadium hosted games of the WBSC Baseball Europe/Africa Olympic qualifier.
