= 2014 European Baseball Championship =

International baseball tournament

Tournament details
- Countries: Czech Republic; Germany
- Dates: 12 – 21 September 2014
- Teams: 12
- Defending champions: Italy

Final positions
- Champions: Netherlands (21st title)
- Runners-up: Italy
- Third place: Spain
- Fourth place: Czech Republic

Tournament statistics
- Games played: 45
- Attendance: 20,234 (450 per game)
- Most HRs: (Czech Republic) Jakob Sládek and (Netherlands) Gianison Boekhoudt (5)
- Most Ks (as pitcher): (Greece) Panagiotis Sykaras (25)

Awards
- MVP: (Netherlands) Curt Smith

The 2014 European Baseball Championship was an international baseball tournament held in the Czech Republic and Germany.

Defending champion Italy lost in the final to the Netherlands, who became champion for the 21st time.

== Qualification ==
The top ten teams of the 2012 European Championship qualified automatically for the tournament.

12 teams played a B-Level Qualifier from July 22 to 27, 2013. Great Britain (11th in 2012) and Russia (12th in 2012) qualified for the tournament.

Pool Czech Republic		Pool Regensburg	
Croatia	10th, 2012 European Baseball Championship	Belgium	9th, 2012 European Baseball Championship
Czech Republic	5th, 2012 European Baseball Championship	France	8th, 2012 European Baseball Championship
Greece	7th, 2012 European Baseball Championship	Germany	4th, 2012 European Baseball Championship
Netherlands	2012 European Baseball Championship	Great Britain	Winner of Zurich Pool
Russia	Winner of Vienna Pool	Italy	2012 European Baseball Championship
Spain	2012 European Baseball Championship	Sweden	6th, 2012 European Baseball Championship

== Round 1 ==
=== Pool A ===
==== Standings ====
Qualified for Pool C
Qualified for 7th-8th place game
Did not qualify for Pool C

Teams	W	L	Pct.	GB	R	RA
Italy	5	0	1.000	–	54	14
France	4	1	.800	1	27	26
Germany	3	2	.600	2	30	17
Belgium	2	3	.400	3	29	22
Great Britain	1	4	.200	4	13	37
Sweden	0	5	.000	5	15	50

==== Schedule ====
September 12, 2014	Sweden	postponed	Great Britain	Armin-Wolf-Arena, Regensburg; Attendance: 0

September 12, 2014	Belgium	7 – 12	Italy	Armin-Wolf-Arena, Regensburg; Attendance: 307
September 12, 2014		Boxscore		Armin-Wolf-Arena, Regensburg; Attendance: 307

September 12, 2014	France	3 – 2	Germany	Armin-Wolf-Arena, Regensburg; Attendance: 1121
September 12, 2014		Boxscore		Armin-Wolf-Arena, Regensburg; Attendance: 1121

September 13, 2014	Sweden	1 – 7	Great Britain	Armin-Wolf-Arena, Regensburg; Attendance: 335
September 13, 2014		Boxscore		Armin-Wolf-Arena, Regensburg; Attendance: 335

September 13, 2014	Italy	12 – 3	Sweden	Armin-Wolf-Arena, Regensburg; Attendance: 837
September 13, 2014		Boxscore		Armin-Wolf-Arena, Regensburg; Attendance: 837

September 13, 2014	Great Britain	5 – 9 (F/10)	France	Armin-Wolf-Arena, Regensburg; Attendance: 1077
September 13, 2014		Boxscore		Armin-Wolf-Arena, Regensburg; Attendance: 1077

September 13, 2014	Germany	6 – 2	Belgium	Armin-Wolf-Arena, Regensburg; Attendance: 1937
September 13, 2014		Boxscore		Armin-Wolf-Arena, Regensburg; Attendance: 1937

September 14, 2014	Sweden	0 – 11 (F/6)	Belgium	Armin-Wolf-Arena, Regensburg; Attendance: 397
September 14, 2014		Boxscore		Armin-Wolf-Arena, Regensburg; Attendance: 397

September 14, 2014	Germany	9 – 0	Great Britain	Armin-Wolf-Arena, Regensburg; Attendance: 1511
September 14, 2014		Boxscore		Armin-Wolf-Arena, Regensburg; Attendance: 1511

September 14, 2014	Italy	12 – 2 (F/8)	France	Armin-Wolf-Arena, Regensburg; Attendance: 353
September 14, 2014		Boxscore		Armin-Wolf-Arena, Regensburg; Attendance: 353

September 15, 2014	Belgium	5 – 0	Great Britain	Armin-Wolf-Arena, Regensburg; Attendance: 174
September 15, 2014		Boxscore		Armin-Wolf-Arena, Regensburg; Attendance: 174

September 15, 2014	Sweden	3 – 8	France	Armin-Wolf-Arena, Regensburg; Attendance: 367
September 15, 2014		Boxscore		Armin-Wolf-Arena, Regensburg; Attendance: 367

September 15, 2014	Italy	5 – 1	Germany	Armin-Wolf-Arena, Regensburg; Attendance: 1711
September 15, 2014		Boxscore		Armin-Wolf-Arena, Regensburg; Attendance: 1711

September 16, 2014	France	5 – 4	Belgium	Armin-Wolf-Arena, Regensburg; Attendance: 165
September 16, 2014		Boxscore		Armin-Wolf-Arena, Regensburg; Attendance: 165

September 16, 2014	Great Britain	1 – 13 (F/7)	Italy	Armin-Wolf-Arena, Regensburg; Attendance: 281
September 16, 2014		Boxscore		Armin-Wolf-Arena, Regensburg; Attendance: 281

September 16, 2014	Germany	12 – 8	Sweden	Armin-Wolf-Arena, Regensburg; Attendance: 1192
September 16, 2014		Boxscore		Armin-Wolf-Arena, Regensburg; Attendance: 1192

=== Pool B ===
==== Standings ====
Qualified for Pool C
Qualified for 7th-8th place game
Did not qualify for Pool C

Teams	W	L	Pct.	GB	R	RA
Netherlands	5	0	1.000	–	68	10
Spain	4	1	.800	1	61	28
Czech Republic	3	2	.600	2	37	20
Russia	1	4	.200	4	18	40
Croatia	1	4	.200	4	16	63
Greece	1	4	.200	4	16	57

==== Schedule ====
September 12, 2014	Greece	3 – 15	Spain	Arrows Ostrava, Ostrava; Attendance: 210
September 12, 2014		Boxscore		Arrows Ostrava, Ostrava; Attendance: 210

September 12, 2014	Croatia	2 – 19 (F/5)	Netherlands	Arrows Ostrava, Ostrava; Attendance: 115
September 12, 2014		Boxscore		Arrows Ostrava, Ostrava; Attendance: 115

September 12, 2014	Czech Republic	5 – 0	Russia	Arrows Ostrava, Ostrava; Attendance: 315
September 12, 2014		Boxscore		Arrows Ostrava, Ostrava; Attendance: 315

September 13, 2014	Spain	18 – 2 (F/6)	Croatia	Arrows Ostrava, Ostrava; Attendance: 75
September 13, 2014		Boxscore		Arrows Ostrava, Ostrava; Attendance: 75

September 13, 2014	Russia	14 – 1 (F/7)	Greece	Arrows Ostrava, Ostrava; Attendance: 250
September 13, 2014		Boxscore		Arrows Ostrava, Ostrava; Attendance: 250

September 13, 2014	Netherlands	7 – 0 (Suspended F/5)	Czech Republic	Arrows Ostrava, Ostrava; Attendance: 580
September 13, 2014		Boxscore		Arrows Ostrava, Ostrava; Attendance: 580

September 14, 2014	Spain	12 – 0 (F/7)	Russia	Arrows Ostrava, Ostrava; Attendance: 85
September 14, 2014		Boxscore		Arrows Ostrava, Ostrava; Attendance: 85

September 14, 2014	Netherlands	11 – 0 (F/7)	Greece	Arrows Ostrava, Ostrava; Attendance: 92
September 14, 2014		Boxscore		Arrows Ostrava, Ostrava; Attendance: 92

September 14, 2014	Czech Republic	13 – 2	Croatia	Arrows Ostrava, Ostrava; Attendance: 195
September 14, 2014		Boxscore		Arrows Ostrava, Ostrava; Attendance: 195

September 15, 2014	Croatia	10 – 3	Russia	Arrows Ostrava, Ostrava; Attendance: 98
September 15, 2014		Boxscore		Arrows Ostrava, Ostrava; Attendance: 98

September 15, 2014	Czech Republic	17 – 2 (F/6)	Greece	Arrows Ostrava, Ostrava; Attendance: 250
September 15, 2014		Boxscore		Arrows Ostrava, Ostrava; Attendance: 250

September 15, 2014	Netherlands	19 – 7 (F/7)	Spain	Arrows Ostrava, Ostrava; Attendance: 123
September 15, 2014		Boxscore		Arrows Ostrava, Ostrava; Attendance: 123

September 16, 2014	Greece	10 – 0 (F/7)	Croatia	Arrows Ostrava, Ostrava; Attendance: 96
September 16, 2014		Boxscore		Arrows Ostrava, Ostrava; Attendance: 96

September 16, 2014	Spain	9 – 2	Czech Republic	Arrows Ostrava, Ostrava; Attendance: 350
September 16, 2014		Boxscore		Arrows Ostrava, Ostrava; Attendance: 350

September 16, 2014	Russia	1 – 12 (F/8)	Netherlands	Arrows Ostrava, Ostrava; Attendance: 290
September 16, 2014		Boxscore		Arrows Ostrava, Ostrava; Attendance: 290

Source: www.baseballstats.eu

== Round 2 ==
=== Pool C ===
==== Standings ====
Qualified for the Final
Did not qualify for the Final

Teams	W	L	Pct.	GB	R	RA
Netherlands	5	0	1.000	–	55	16
Italy	4	1	.800	1	32	13
Spain	3	2	.600	2	34	35
Czech Republic	1	4	.200	4	19	33
Germany	1	4	.200	4	15	24
France	1	4	.200	4	18	52

==== Schedule ====
September 18, 2014	Italy	6 – 4	Spain	MBS, Brno; Attendance: 250
September 18, 2014		Boxscore		MBS, Brno; Attendance: 250

September 18, 2014	France	3 – 14 (F/7)	Czech Republic	MBS, Brno; Attendance: 340
September 18, 2014		Boxscore		MBS, Brno; Attendance: 340

September 18, 2014	Germany	4 – 10	Netherlands	MBS, Brno; Attendance: 280
September 18, 2014		Boxscore		MBS, Brno; Attendance: 280

September 19, 2014	Netherlands	14 – 5	France	MBS, Brno; Attendance: 200
September 19, 2014		Boxscore		MBS, Brno; Attendance: 200

September 19, 2014	Spain	4 – 3	Germany	MBS, Brno; Attendance: 170
September 19, 2014		Boxscore		MBS, Brno; Attendance: 170

September 19, 2014	Czech Republic	1 – 9	Italy	MBS, Brno; Attendance: 687
September 19, 2014		Boxscore		MBS, Brno; Attendance: 687

September 20, 2014	Spain	10 – 5	France	MBS, Brno; Attendance: 89
September 20, 2014		Boxscore		MBS, Brno; Attendance: 89

September 20, 2014	Germany	5 – 2	Czech Republic	MBS, Brno; Attendance: 620
September 20, 2014		Boxscore		MBS, Brno; Attendance: 620

September 20, 2014	Italy	0 – 5	Netherlands	MBS, Brno; Attendance: 410
September 20, 2014		Boxscore		MBS, Brno; Attendance: 410

Source: www.baseballstats.eu

=== Classification game ===
==== 7th/8th place game ====
September 18, 2014	Belgium	12 – 2 (F/8)	Russia	Strawberry Field, Blansko; Attendance: 162
September 18, 2014		Boxscore		Strawberry Field, Blansko; Attendance: 162

=== Pool D ===
==== Standings ====
relegated to Division B

Teams	W	L	Pct.	GB	R	RA
Great Britain	3	0	1.000	–	26	5
Greece	1	2	.333	2	14	12
Sweden	1	2	.333	2	13	18
Croatia	1	2	.333	2	11	29

==== Schedule ====
September 18, 2014	Croatia	11 – 10	Sweden	Hvezda, Třebíč; Attendance: 85
September 18, 2014		Boxscore		Hvezda, Třebíč; Attendance: 85

September 18, 2014	Great Britain	10 – 4	Greece	Na Hvezda, Třebíč; Attendance: 92
September 18, 2014		Boxscore		Na Hvezda, Třebíč; Attendance: 92

September 19, 2014	Sweden	2 – 0	Greece	Hvezda, Třebíč; Attendance: 165
September 19, 2014		Boxscore		Hvezda, Třebíč; Attendance: 165

September 19, 2014	Great Britain	9 – 0	Croatia	Na Hvezda, Třebíč; Attendance: 180
September 19, 2014		Boxscore		Na Hvezda, Třebíč; Attendance: 180

Source: www.baseballstats.eu

== Final ==
September 21, 2014	Netherlands	6 – 3	Italy	MBS, Brno; Attendance: 840
September 21, 2014		Boxscore		MBS, Brno; Attendance: 840

== Final standings ==
Rk	Team	W	L
1st place, gold medalist(s)	Netherlands	9	0
Lost in Gold medal game
2nd place, silver medalist(s)	Italy	7	2
Failed to qualify for Gold medal game
3rd place, bronze medalist(s)	Spain	6	2
4	Czech Republic	4	4
5	Germany	4	4
6	France	4	4
Failed to qualify for Pool C
7	Belgium	3	3
8	Russia	1	5
Failed to qualify for the 7th/8th place game & Pool C
9	Great Britain	3	4
10	Greece	1	6
11	Sweden	1	6
12	Croatia	2	5

2014 European Baseball Championship

Netherlands
21st title

== Awards and statistical leaders ==
- Most valuable player: (Netherlands) Curt Smith
- Outstanding defensive player: (Italy) Alessandro Vaglio
- Leading hitter: (Spain) Oscar Angulo, .543 batting average
- Best pitcher (win–loss record): (Spain) Erik Gonzalez and seven others, 2–0
- Best pitcher (earned run average): (Netherlands) Mike Bolsenbroek, 0.00 in 16 innings pitched
- Most strikeouts: (Greece) Panagiotis Sykaras, 25
- Most home runs: (Czech Republic) Jakob Sládek and (Netherlands) Gianison Boekhoudt, 5
- Most runs batted in: Boekhoudt, 15
- Most stolen bases: (Netherlands) Kalian Sam, 5 in 5 attempts
