= 2016 European Baseball Championship =

Tournament details
- Country: Netherlands
- City: Hoofddorp
- Dates: September 9–18, 2016
- Teams: 12
- Defending champions: Netherlands

Final positions
- Champions: Netherlands (22nd title)
- Runners-up: Spain
- Third place: Italy
- Fourth place: Germany

Tournament statistics
- Games played: 45
- Attendance: 30,191 (671 per game)

Awards
- MVP: (Netherlands) Stijn van der Meer

The 2016 European Baseball Championship was an international baseball tournament organized by Confederation of European Baseball. The 2016 European Championship was held from September 9 to 18, 2016 in Hoofddorp, Netherlands. It was organized by the Royal Netherlands Baseball and Softball Association (KNBSB), the city of Hoofddorp, and the local baseball club Hoofddorp Pioniers.

== Qualification ==
The top ten teams of the 2014 European Championship qualified automatically for the tournament. Two additional teams qualified from the B-level tournament. Qualification started on 29 July 2014 with C-level qualifiers for the B-level tournament.

Pool Czech Republic		Pool Regensburg	
Belgium	7th, 2014 European Baseball Championship	Italy	2014 European Baseball Championship
Czech Republic	4th, 2014 European Baseball Championship	France	6th, 2014 European Baseball Championship
Greece	10th, 2014 European Baseball Championship	Germany	5th, 2014 European Baseball Championship
Netherlands	2014 European Baseball Championship	Great Britain	9th, 2014 European Baseball Championship
Russia	8th, 2014 European Baseball Championship	Croatia	Winner of Karlovac group
Spain	2014 European Baseball Championship	Sweden	Winner of Vienna group

== Round 1 ==
=== Pool A ===
==== Standings ====
Qualified for Pool Winners
Qualified for 7th–8th place game
Qualified for Pool Losers

Teams	W	L	Pct.	GB	R	RA
Netherlands	5	0	1.000	–	42	7
Germany	4	1	0.800	1.05	28	17
Czech Republic	3	2	0.600	2.0	23	15
Sweden	2	3	0.500	3.0	21	25
Russia	1	4	0.200	4.0	17	44
Great Britain	0	5	0.000	5.0	15	38

==== Schedule ====
September 9, 2016	Sweden	0 – 4	Germany	Hoofddorp 1, Hoofddorp; Attendance: 225
September 9, 2016		Boxscore		Hoofddorp 1, Hoofddorp; Attendance: 225

September 9, 2016	Czech Republic	12 – 0 F/7	Russia	Hoofddorp 2, Hoofddorp; Attendance: 50
September 9, 2016		Boxscore		Hoofddorp 2, Hoofddorp; Attendance: 50

September 9, 2016	Netherlands	11 – 1	Great Britain	Hoofddorp 1, Hoofddorp; Attendance: 2,100
September 9, 2016		Boxscore		Hoofddorp 1, Hoofddorp; Attendance: 2,100

September 10, 2016	Russia	1 – 8	Sweden	Hoofddorp 1, Hoofddorp; Attendance: 250
September 10, 2016		Boxscore		Hoofddorp 1, Hoofddorp; Attendance: 250

September 10, 2016	Great Britain	1 – 4	Czech Republic	Nieuw-Vennep; Attendance: 275
September 10, 2016		Boxscore		Nieuw-Vennep; Attendance: 275

September 10, 2016	Germany	2 – 10	Netherlands	Hoofddorp 1, Hoofddorp; Attendance: 3,100
September 10, 2016		Boxscore		Hoofddorp 1, Hoofddorp; Attendance: 3,100

September 11, 2016	Sweden	1 – 6	Czech Republic	Hoofddorp 2, Hoofddorp; Attendance: 200
September 11, 2016		Boxscore		Hoofddorp 2, Hoofddorp; Attendance: 200

September 11, 2016	Russia	1 – 3	Netherlands	Hoofddorp 1, Hoofddorp; Attendance: 2,950
September 11, 2016		Boxscore		Hoofddorp 1, Hoofddorp; Attendance: 2,950

September 11, 2016	Great Britain	2 – 3	Germany	Hoofddorp 2, Hoofddorp; Attendance: 210
September 11, 2016		Boxscore		Hoofddorp 2, Hoofddorp; Attendance: 210

September 12, 2016	Russia	4 – 16 F/7	Germany	Hoofddorp 2, Hoofddorp; Attendance: 65
September 12, 2016		Boxscore		Hoofddorp 2, Hoofddorp; Attendance: 65

September 12, 2016	Sweden	9 – 6 F/11	Great Britain	Nieuw-Vennep; Attendance: 100
September 12, 2016		Boxscore		Nieuw-Vennep; Attendance: 100

September 12, 2016	Czech Republic	0 – 10 F/7	Netherlands	Hoofddorp 1, Hoofddorp; Attendance: 1,550
September 12, 2016		Boxscore		Hoofddorp 1, Hoofddorp; Attendance: 1,550

September 13, 2016	Great Britain	5 – 11	Russia	Hoofddorp 1, Hoofddorp; Attendance: 60
September 13, 2016		Boxscore		Hoofddorp 1, Hoofddorp; Attendance: 60

September 13, 2016	Germany	3 – 1	Czech Republic	Nieuw-Vennep; Attendance: 255
September 13, 2016		Boxscore		Nieuw-Vennep; Attendance: 255

September 13, 2016	Netherlands	8 – 3	Sweden	Hoofddorp 1, Hoofddorp; Attendance: 1,150
September 13, 2016		Boxscore		Hoofddorp 1, Hoofddorp; Attendance: 1,150

Source: www.baseballstats.eu [5]

=== Pool B ===
==== Standings ====
Qualified for Pool Winners
Qualified for 7th–8th place game
Qualified for Pool Losers

Teams	W	L	Pct.	GB	R	RA
Spain	5	0	1.000	–	43	5
Italy	4	1	0.800	1.0	67	17
Belgium	3	2	0.600	2.0	38	31
France	2	3	0.400	3.0	30	28
Croatia	1	4	0.200	4.0	16	45
Greece	0	5	0.000	5.0	5	68

Source: www.baseballstats.eu [4]

==== Schedule ====
September 9, 2016	Croatia	1 – 16 F/6	France	Nieuw-Vennep; Attendance: 70
September 9, 2016		Boxscore		Nieuw-Vennep; Attendance: 70

September 9, 2016	Italy	21 – 2 F/7	Greece	Hoofddorp 1, Hoofddorp; Attendance: 250
September 9, 2016		Boxscore		Hoofddorp 1, Hoofddorp; Attendance: 250

September 9, 2016	Spain	11 – 1 F/7	Belgium	Hoofddorp 2, Hoofddorp; Attendance: 125
September 9, 2016		Boxscore		Hoofddorp 2, Hoofddorp; Attendance: 125

September 10, 2016	Greece	1 – 12	Spain	Hoofddorp 2, Hoofddorp; Attendance: 65
September 10, 2016		Boxscore		Hoofddorp 2, Hoofddorp; Attendance: 65

September 10, 2016	France	3 – 6	Italy	Hoofddorp 1, Hoofddorp; Attendance: 800
September 10, 2016		Boxscore		Hoofddorp 1, Hoofddorp; Attendance: 800

September 10, 2016	Belgium	5 – 1	Croatia	Hoofddorp 2, Hoofddorp; Attendance: 160
September 10, 2016		Boxscore		Hoofddorp 2, Hoofddorp; Attendance: 160

September 11, 2016	Croatia	0 – 6	Spain	Hoofddorp 1, Hoofddorp; Attendance: 700
September 11, 2016		Boxscore		Hoofddorp 1, Hoofddorp; Attendance: 700

September 11, 2016	Greece	1 – 7	France	Nieuw-Vennep; Attendance: 160
September 11, 2016		Boxscore		Nieuw-Vennep; Attendance: 160

September 11, 2016	Belgium	0 – 15 F/5	Italy	Hoofddorp 1, Hoofddorp; Attendance: 500
September 11, 2016		Boxscore		Hoofddorp 1, Hoofddorp; Attendance: 500

September 12, 2016	Croatia	10 – 0 F/8	Greece	Hoofddorp 1, Hoofddorp; Attendance: 175
September 12, 2016		Boxscore		Hoofddorp 1, Hoofddorp; Attendance: 175

September 12, 2016	Spain	8 – 3	Italy	Hoofddorp 1, Hoofddorp; Attendance: 675
September 12, 2016		Boxscore		Hoofddorp 1, Hoofddorp; Attendance: 675

September 12, 2016	Belgium	14 – 3	France	Hoofddorp 2, Hoofddorp; Attendance: 80
September 12, 2016		Boxscore		Hoofddorp 2, Hoofddorp; Attendance: 80

September 13, 2016	France	0 – 6	Spain	Hoofddorp 2, Hoofddorp; Attendance: 80
September 13, 2016		Boxscore		Hoofddorp 2, Hoofddorp; Attendance: 80

September 13, 2016	Italy	22 – 4 F/7	Croatia	Hoofddorp 1, Hoofddorp; Attendance: 200
September 13, 2016		Boxscore		Hoofddorp 1, Hoofddorp; Attendance: 200

September 13, 2016	Greece	1 – 18 F/5	Belgium	Hoofddorp 2, Hoofddorp; Attendance: 85
September 13, 2016		Boxscore		Hoofddorp 2, Hoofddorp; Attendance: 85

Source: www.baseballstats.eu [5]

== Round 2 ==
=== Pool Winners ===
==== Standings ====
Qualified for the Final
Did not qualify for the Final

Teams	W	L	Pct.	GB	R	RA
Netherlands	5	0	1.000	–	39	10
Spain	4	1	.800	1.0	30	8
Italy	3	2	.600	2.0	38	16
Germany	2	3	.400	3.0	19	28
Czech Republic	1	4	.200	4.0	10	28
Belgium	0	5	.000	5.0	9	56

Source: www.baseballstats.eu[4]

==== Schedule ====
September 15, 2016	Belgium	3 – 4 F/10	Czech Republic	Hoofddorp 1, Hoofddorp; Attendance: 250
September 15, 2016		Boxscore		Hoofddorp 1, Hoofddorp; Attendance: 250

September 15, 2016	Italy	12 – 0	Germany	Hoofddorp 1, Hoofddorp; Attendance: 420
September 15, 2016		Boxscore		Hoofddorp 1, Hoofddorp; Attendance: 420

September 15, 2016	Spain	0 – 1	Netherlands	Hoofddorp 1, Hoofddorp; Attendance: 1,450
September 15, 2016		Boxscore		Hoofddorp 1, Hoofddorp; Attendance: 1,450

September 16, 2016	Belgium	2 – 14 F/7	Germany	Hoofddorp 1, Hoofddorp; Attendance: 350
September 16, 2016		Boxscore		Hoofddorp 1, Hoofddorp; Attendance: 350

September 16, 2016	Spain	9 – 3	Czech Republic	Hoofddorp 1, Hoofddorp; Attendance: 550
September 16, 2016		Boxscore		Hoofddorp 1, Hoofddorp; Attendance: 550

September 16, 2016	Italy	5 – 6 F/10	Netherlands	Hoofddorp 1, Hoofddorp; Attendance: 2,450
September 16, 2016		Boxscore		Hoofddorp 1, Hoofddorp; Attendance: 2,450

September 17, 2016	Czech Republic	2 – 3	Italy	Hoofddorp 1, Hoofddorp; Attendance: 525
September 17, 2016		Boxscore		Hoofddorp 1, Hoofddorp; Attendance: 525

September 17, 2016	Germany	0 – 3	Spain	Hoofddorp 1, Hoofddorp; Attendance: 920
September 17, 2016		Boxscore		Hoofddorp 1, Hoofddorp; Attendance: 920

September 17, 2016	Netherlands	12 – 3	Belgium	Hoofddorp 1, Hoofddorp; Attendance: 2,675
September 17, 2016		Boxscore		Hoofddorp 1, Hoofddorp; Attendance: 2,675

Source: www.baseballstats.eu[5]

=== Classification game ===
==== 7th/8th place game ====
September 14, 2016	Sweden	5 – 7	France	Hoofddorp 1, Hoofddorp; Attendance: 312
September 14, 2016		Boxscore		Hoofddorp 1, Hoofddorp; Attendance: 312

Source: www.baseballstats.eu[5]

=== Pool Losers ===
==== Standings ====
relegated to Division B

Teams	W	L	Pct.	GB	R	RA
Great Britain	2	1	.667	–	30	15
Croatia	2	1	.667	–	25	6
Greece	1	2	.333	1.0	5	30
Russia	1	2	.333	1.0	12	21

Source[4]

==== Schedule ====
September 15, 2016	Russia	1 – 3	Greece	Hoofddorp 2, Hoofddorp; Attendance: 91
September 15, 2016		Boxscore		Hoofddorp 2, Hoofddorp; Attendance: 91

September 15, 2016	Croatia	2 – 6	Great Britain	Hoofddorp 2, Hoofddorp; Attendance: 106
September 15, 2016		Boxscore		Hoofddorp 2, Hoofddorp; Attendance: 106

September 16, 2016	Greece	2 – 19 F/7	Great Britain	Hoofddorp 2, Hoofddorp; Attendance: 52
September 16, 2016		Boxscore		Hoofddorp 2, Hoofddorp; Attendance: 52

September 16, 2016	Russia	0 – 13 F/7	Croatia	Hoofddorp 2, Hoofddorp; Attendance: 25
September 16, 2016		Boxscore		Hoofddorp 2, Hoofddorp; Attendance: 25

Source: www.baseballstats.eu [5]

== Final ==
September 18, 2016	Netherlands	3 – 2 F/10	Spain	Hoofddorp 1, Hoofddorp; Attendance: 3,350
September 18, 2016		Boxscore		Hoofddorp 1, Hoofddorp; Attendance: 3,350

Source: www.baseballstats.eu [5]

== Final standings ==
relegated to Division B

Rk	Team	W	L	Pct.	R	RA
1st place, gold medalist(s)	Netherlands	9	0	1.000	64	17
Lost in Gold medal game
2nd place, silver medalist(s)	Spain	7	2	.778	57	12
Failed to qualify for Gold medal game
3rd place, bronze medalist(s)	Italy	6	2	.750	87	25
4	Germany	5	3	.625	42	34
5	Czech Republic	4	4	.500	32	30
6	Belgium	3	5	.375	44	61
Failed to qualify for Pool Winners
7	France	3	3	.500	37	33
8	Sweden	2	4	.333	26	32
Failed to qualify for the 7th/8th place game & Pool Winners
9	Great Britain	2	5	.286	40	42
10	Croatia	2	5	.286	31	51
11	Greece	1	6	.143	10	88
12	Russia	1	6	.143	18	60

== Awards ==
The CEB announced the following awards at the completion of the tournament.

Individual Awards	Name
Most Valuable Player	(Netherlands) Stijn van der Meer
Best hitter	(Netherlands) Yurendell DeCaster
Outstanding defensive player	(Spain) Luis Guillorme

== Statistics leaders ==
=== Batting ===
Statistic	Name	Total/Avg
Batting average*	(Netherlands) Yurendell DeCaster	.543
Hits	(Netherlands) Yurendell DeCaster	19
Runs	(Italy) Alessandro Vaglio	17
Home runs	(Netherlands) Kalian Sams	4
RBI	(Italy) Mattia Reginato (Netherlands) Kalian Sams	12
Walks	(Netherlands) Gianison Boekhoudt (Spain) Daniel Martínez	11
Strikeouts	(Germany) Maximilian Boldt (Czech Republic) Matej Hejma (Netherlands) Randolph Oduber	9
Stolen bases	(Netherlands) Roger Bernadina (France) Felix Brown (Italy) Alex Liddi	4
On-base percentage*	(Italy) Alessandro Vaglio	.658
Slugging percentage*	(Italy) Alessandro Vaglio	.920
OPS*	(Italy) Alessandro Vaglio	1.578

* Minimum 2.7 plate appearances per game

=== Pitching ===
Statistic	Name	Total/Avg
Wins	(Spain) Rhiner Cruz	3
Losses	5 players	2
Saves	9 players	1
Innings pitched	(Croatia) Antonio Horvatić (Germany) Enorbel Márquez	16.0
Hits allowed	(Greece) Dimitrios Kourtis (Russia) Andrey Lobanov	19
Runs allowed	(Greece) Dimitrios Kourtis	15
Earned runs allowed	(Greece) Dimitrios Kourtis	15
ERA*	(Spain) Antonio Noguera	0.00
Walks	(Russia) Denis Leonov (Sweden) Per Sjoers	8
Strikeouts	(Russia) Denis Leonov	18

* Minimum 1.0 inning pitched per game
