= 2019 European Baseball Championship =

2019 international baseball tournament

Tournament details
- Country: Germany
- Dates: 7–15 September 2019
- Teams: 12
- Defending champions: Netherlands

Final positions
- Champions: Netherlands (23rd title)
- Runners-up: Italy
- Third place: Spain
- Fourth place: Israel

Tournament statistics
- Games played: 47
- Attendance: 21,653 (461 per game)
- Best BA: (Italy) Sebastiano Poma (.533)
- Most HRs: (Netherlands) Ademar Rifaela (6)
- Most SBs: (United Kingdom) Nateshon Thomas (5)
- Best ERA: (Israel) Joey Wagman (0.00)
- Most Ks (as pitcher): (United Kingdom) Alex Webb (Croatia) José Díaz (16)

Awards
- MVP: (Netherlands) Ademar Rifaela

The 2019 European Baseball Championship was an international baseball tournament organized by the Confederation of European Baseball. The championship was held September 7–15, 2019 in Bonn and Solingen, Germany. The Netherlands defended its European title, winning its 23rd continental championship. The Dutch defeated Italy in the championship game, while Spain defeated Israel in the third-place game. Ademar Rifaela of the Netherlands was the tournament most valuable player.

The tournament was part of qualifications for the 2020 Summer Olympics, with the top five teams and Team South Africa competing at the European-African qualifier for the 2020 Summer Olympics, which was played in September 2019 in Bologna and Parma, Italy.

== Qualification ==
The top 10 teams from the 2016 European championship qualified automatically for the tournament. Two additional teams, Austria and Israel, qualified from the 14-team B-Pool tournament.

| Pool Bonn | | Pool Solingen | |
|---|---|---|---|
| Belgium | 6th, 2016 European Baseball Championship | Italy | 2016 European Baseball Championship |
| Croatia | 10th, 2016 European Baseball Championship | Netherlands | 2016 European Baseball Championship |
| Czech Republic | 5th, 2016 European Baseball Championship | Spain | 2016 European Baseball Championship |
| France | 7th, 2016 European Baseball Championship | Sweden | 8th, 2016 European Baseball Championship |
| Germany | 4th, 2016 European Baseball Championship | Austria | Winner of Belgrade group and 2018 playoff series against Lithuania |
| Great Britain | 9th, 2016 European Baseball Championship | Israel | Winner of Blagoevgrad Group and 2019 playoff series against Lithuania |

== Round 1 ==
=== Pool A ===
==== Standings ====
| Qualified for Quarterfinals |
| Qualified for Relegation Round |

| Teams | W | L | Pct. | GB | R | RA |
|---|---|---|---|---|---|---|
| Netherlands | 4 | 1 | .800 | – | 46 | 15 |
| Israel | 4 | 1 | .800 | – | 25 | 23 |
| Czech Republic | 3 | 2 | .600 | 1.0 | 32 | 25 |
| Germany | 2 | 3 | .400 | 2.0 | 19 | 23 |
| Great Britain | 2 | 3 | .400 | 2.0 | 23 | 28 |
| Sweden | 0 | 5 | .000 | 4.0 | 14 | 45 |

| September 7, 2019 | Czech Republic | 1 – 6 | Israel | Baseballpark Weyersberg, Solingen; Attendance: 150 |
| September 7, 2019 | | Boxscore | | Baseballpark Weyersberg, Solingen; Attendance: 150 |

| September 7, 2019 | Sweden | 1 – 9 | Germany | Bonn 1, Bonn; Attendance: 1,900 |
| September 7, 2019 | | Boxscore | | Bonn 1, Bonn; Attendance: 1,900 |

| September 8, 2019 | Israel | 4 – 3 | Sweden | Baseballpark Weyersberg, Solingen; Attendance: 150 |
| September 8, 2019 | | Boxscore | | Baseballpark Weyersberg, Solingen; Attendance: 150 |

| September 8, 2019 | Netherlands | 6 – 8 | Czech Republic | Bonn 1, Bonn; Attendance: 1,200 |
| September 8, 2019 | | Boxscore | | Bonn 1, Bonn; Attendance: 1,200 |

| September 8, 2019 | Germany | 1 – 0 | Great Britain | Bonn 1, Bonn; Attendance: 1,350 |
| September 8, 2019 | | Boxscore | | Bonn 1, Bonn; Attendance: 1,350 |

| September 9, 2019 | Czech Republic | 3 – 4 (10) | Great Britain | Baseballpark Weyersberg, Solingen; Attendance: 150 |
| September 9, 2019 | | Boxscore | | Baseballpark Weyersberg, Solingen; Attendance: 150 |

| September 9, 2019 | Netherlands | 9 – 0 | Sweden | Bonn 1, Bonn; Attendance: 300 |
| September 9, 2019 | | Boxscore | | Bonn 1, Bonn; Attendance: 300 |

| September 9, 2019 | Germany | 2 – 4 (10) | Israel | Bonn 1, Bonn; Attendance: 500 |
| September 9, 2019 | | Boxscore | | Bonn 1, Bonn; Attendance: 500 |

| September 10, 2019 | Great Britain | 4 – 7 | Israel | Baseballpark Weyersberg, Solingen; Attendance: 150 |
| September 10, 2019 | | Boxscore | | Baseballpark Weyersberg, Solingen; Attendance: 150 |

| September 10, 2019 | Czech Republic | 10 – 3 | Sweden | Baseballpark Weyersberg, Solingen; Attendance: 150 |
| September 10, 2019 | | Boxscore | | Baseballpark Weyersberg, Solingen; Attendance: 150 |

| September 10, 2019 | Netherlands | 8 – 1 | Germany | Bonn 1, Bonn; Attendance: 1,100 |
| September 10, 2019 | | Boxscore | | Bonn 1, Bonn; Attendance: 1,100 |

| September 11, 2019 | Sweden | 7 – 13 | Great Britain | Bonn 2, Bonn; Attendance: 50 |
| September 11, 2019 | | Boxscore | | Bonn 2, Bonn; Attendance: 50 |

| September 11, 2019 | Israel | 4 – 13 | Netherlands | Bonn 1, Bonn; Attendance: 250 |
| September 11, 2019 | | Boxscore | | Bonn 1, Bonn; Attendance: 250 |

| September 11, 2019 | Great Britain | 2 – 10^{1} | Netherlands | Bonn 2, Bonn; Attendance: 150 |
| September 11, 2019 | | Boxscore | | Bonn 2, Bonn; Attendance: 150 |

| September 11, 2019 | Germany | 6 – 10 | Czech Republic | Bonn 1, Bonn; Attendance: 700 |
| September 11, 2019 | | Boxscore | | Bonn 1, Bonn; Attendance: 700 |

^{1} game suspended on September 7, 2019, in the 9th due to darkness (Ned led 10 – 2).

=== Pool B ===
==== Standings ====
| Qualified for Quarterfinals |
| Qualified for Relegation Round |

| Teams | W | L | Pct. | GB | R | RA |
|---|---|---|---|---|---|---|
| Italy | 5 | 0 | 1.000 | – | 52 | 11 |
| Spain | 4 | 1 | .800 | 1.0 | 44 | 24 |
| France | 3 | 2 | .600 | 2.0 | 52 | 30 |
| Belgium | 2 | 3 | .400 | 3.0 | 25 | 43 |
| Austria | 1 | 4 | .200 | 4.0 | 21 | 47 |
| Croatia | 0 | 5 | .000 | 5.0 | 10 | 49 |

| September 7, 2019 | Croatia | 2 – 3 | Spain | Bonn 1, Bonn; Attendance: 425 |
| September 7, 2019 | | Boxscore | | Bonn 1, Bonn; Attendance: 425 |

| September 7, 2019 | Belgium | 5 – 1 | Austria | Bonn 2, Bonn; Attendance: 198 |
| September 7, 2019 | | Boxscore | | Bonn 2, Bonn; Attendance: 198 |

| September 7, 2019 | France | 2 – 16 | Italy | Bonn 1, Bonn; Attendance: 850 |
| September 7, 2019 | | Boxscore | | Bonn 1, Bonn; Attendance: 850 |

| September 8, 2019 | Spain | 13 – 5 | Belgium | Bonn 1, Bonn; Attendance: 300 |
| September 8, 2019 | | Boxscore | | Bonn 1, Bonn; Attendance: 300 |

| September 8, 2019 | Austria | 6 – 12 | France | Bonn 2, Bonn; Attendance: 100 |
| September 8, 2019 | | Boxscore | | Bonn 2, Bonn; Attendance: 100 |

| September 8, 2019 | Italy | 2 – 1 (10) | Croatia | Baseballpark Weyersberg, Solingen; Attendance: 150 |
| September 8, 2019 | | Boxscore | | Baseballpark Weyersberg, Solingen; Attendance: 150 |

| September 9, 2019 | Italy | 10 – 1 | Austria | Bonn 1, Bonn; Attendance: 100 |
| September 9, 2019 | | Boxscore | | Bonn 1, Bonn; Attendance: 100 |

| September 9, 2019 | Belgium | 9 – 6 | Croatia | Bonn 2, Bonn; Attendance: 100 |
| September 9, 2019 | | Boxscore | | Bonn 2, Bonn; Attendance: 100 |

| September 9, 2019 | Spain | 6 – 3 | France | Baseballpark Weyersberg, Solingen; Attendance: 150 |
| September 9, 2019 | | Boxscore | | Baseballpark Weyersberg, Solingen; Attendance: 150 |

| September 10, 2019 | Belgium | 2 – 12 (8) | France | Bonn 1, Bonn; Attendance: 80 |
| September 10, 2019 | | Boxscore | | Bonn 1, Bonn; Attendance: 80 |

| September 10, 2019 | Croatia | 1 – 12 (7) | Austria | Bonn 2, Bonn; Attendance: 60 |
| September 10, 2019 | | Boxscore | | Bonn 2, Bonn; Attendance: 60 |

| September 10, 2019 | Spain | 3 – 13 | Italy | Bonn 1, Bonn; Attendance: 250 |
| September 10, 2019 | | Boxscore | | Bonn 1, Bonn; Attendance: 250 |

| September 11, 2019 | Italy | 11 – 4 | Belgium | Bonn 1, Bonn; Attendance: 80 |
| September 11, 2019 | | Boxscore | | Bonn 1, Bonn; Attendance: 80 |

| September 11, 2019 | Austria | 1 – 19 (6) | Spain | Baseballpark Weyersberg, Solingen; Attendance: 150 |
| September 11, 2019 | | Boxscore | | Baseballpark Weyersberg, Solingen; Attendance: 150 |

| September 11, 2019 | France | 23 – 0 (5) | Croatia | Baseballpark Weyersberg, Solingen; Attendance: 150 |
| September 11, 2019 | | Boxscore | | Baseballpark Weyersberg, Solingen; Attendance: 150 |

== Play-offs ==
Quarter-finals
September 13 11:00 - Bonn 1
Israel | 8
France | 2
September 13 19:00 - Bonn 1
Italy | 7
Germany | 5
September 13 15:00 - Bonn 1
Netherlands | 17
Belgium | 2
September 13 16:00 - Solingen
Spain | 5
Czech Republic | 4

Semi-finals
September 14 19:00 - Bonn 1
Israel | 6
Italy | 7
September 14 15:00 - Bonn 1
Netherlands | 1
Spain | 0

Final
September 15 19:00 - Bonn 1
Italy | 1
Netherlands | 5
3rd Place
September 15 15:00 - Bonn 1
Spain | 16
Israel | 11

=== Quarterfinals ===
Order of games can change after round robin

| September 13, 2019 11:00 | Israel | 8 – 2 | France | Bonn 1, Bonn; Attendance: 200 |
| September 13, 2019 11:00 | | Boxscore | | Bonn 1, Bonn; Attendance: 200 |

| September 13, 2019 15:00 | Netherlands | 17 – 2 (5) | Belgium | Bonn 1, Bonn; Attendance: 350 |
| September 13, 2019 15:00 | | Boxscore | | Bonn 1, Bonn; Attendance: 350 |

| September 13, 2019 16:00 | Spain | 5 – 4 (10) | Czech Republic | Baseballpark Weyersberg, Solingen; Attendance: 150 |
| September 13, 2019 16:00 | | Boxscore | | Baseballpark Weyersberg, Solingen; Attendance: 150 |

| September 13, 2019 19:00 | Italy | 7 – 5 | Germany | Bonn 1, Bonn; Attendance: 1,000 |
| September 13, 2019 19:00 | | Boxscore | | Bonn 1, Bonn; Attendance: 1,000 |

=== Semifinals ===
| September 14, 2019 15:00 | Netherlands | 1 – 0 | Spain | Bonn 1, Bonn; Attendance: 900 |
| September 14, 2019 15:00 | | Boxscore | | Bonn 1, Bonn; Attendance: 900 |

| September 14, 2019 19:00 | Israel | 6 – 7 | Italy | Bonn 1, Bonn; Attendance: 1,000 |
| September 14, 2019 19:00 | | Boxscore | | Bonn 1, Bonn; Attendance: 1,000 |

=== Bronze ===
| September 15, 2019 15:00 | Spain | 16 – 11 | Israel | Bonn 1, Bonn; Attendance: 1,200 |
| September 15, 2019 15:00 | | Boxscore | | Bonn 1, Bonn; Attendance: 1,200 |

=== Final ===
| September 15, 2019 19:00 | Italy | 1 – 5 | Netherlands | Bonn 1, Bonn; Attendance: 2,000 |
| September 15, 2019 19:00 | | Boxscore | | Bonn 1, Bonn; Attendance: 2,000 |

== Placement Round 5th–8th place ==
Placement round
September 14 11:00 - Bonn 2
Czech Republic | 5
Belgium | 4
September 14 11:00 - Bonn 1
France | 4
Germany | 14

5th Place
September 15 11:00 - Bonn 1
Czech Republic | 4
Germany | 3

=== Classification Games ===
| September 14, 2019 11:00 | Czech Republic | 5 – 4 | Belgium | Bonn 2, Bonn; Attendance: 80 |
| September 14, 2019 11:00 | | Boxscore | | Bonn 2, Bonn; Attendance: 80 |

| September 14, 2019 11:00 | France | 4 – 14 (7) | Germany | Bonn 1, Bonn; Attendance: 800 |
| September 14, 2019 11:00 | | Boxscore | | Bonn 1, Bonn; Attendance: 800 |

=== 5th place ===
| September 15, 2019 11:00 | Czech Republic | 4 – 3 | Germany | Bonn 1, Bonn; Attendance: 1,900 |
| September 15, 2019 11:00 | | Boxscore | | Bonn 1, Bonn; Attendance: 1,900 |

Note: There was no game for 7th place.

== Placement Round 9th–12th Place / Relegation Round ==
There was a scheduling mistake in this placement/relegation round: the first two games, it should have been A5-B6 and B5-A6, instead it was A5-B5 and A6-B6.

Quarterfinals
B5 | Austria | 6
A5 | Great Britain | 1
Winner's bracket
A6 | Sweden | 2
B6 | Croatia | 17
L1 | Great Britain | 12
L2 | Sweden | 2
Loser's bracket

Semifinals
W1 | Austria | 10
W2 | Croatia | 0
L3 | Croatia | 1
W4 | Great Britain | 5

9th place
W3 | Austria | 9
W5 | Great Britain | 11

=== Relegation round ===
| September 12, 2019 11:00 | Austria | 6 – 1 | Great Britain | Bonn 1, Bonn; Attendance: 100 |
| September 12, 2019 11:00 | | Boxscore | | Bonn 1, Bonn; Attendance: 100 |

| September 12, 2019 15:00 | Croatia | 17 – 2 (6) | Sweden | Bonn 1, Bonn; Attendance: 100 |
| September 12, 2019 15:00 | | Boxscore | | Bonn 1, Bonn; Attendance: 100 |

| September 13, 2019 12:30 | Great Britain | 12 – 2 (8) | Sweden | Baseballpark Weyersberg, Solingen; Attendance: 80 |
| September 13, 2019 12:30 | | Boxscore | | Baseballpark Weyersberg, Solingen; Attendance: 80 |

The loser of the above game is in 12th place and is relegated.

| September 13, 2019 13:00 | Austria | 10 – 0 (7) | Croatia | Bonn 2, Bonn; Attendance: 100 |
| September 13, 2019 13:00 | | Boxscore | | Bonn 2, Bonn; Attendance: 100 |

| September 14, 2019 12:30 | Croatia | 1 – 5 | Great Britain | Baseballpark Weyersberg, Solingen; Attendance: 150 |
| September 14, 2019 12:30 | | Boxscore | | Baseballpark Weyersberg, Solingen; Attendance: 150 |

The loser of the above game is in 11th place and is relegated.

=== 9th place ===
| September 15, 2019 12:30 | Austria | 9 – 11 | Great Britain | Baseballpark Weyersberg, Solingen; Attendance: 150 |
| September 15, 2019 12:30 | | Boxscore | | Baseballpark Weyersberg, Solingen; Attendance: 150 |

== Final standings ==
| Rk | Team | W | L | Pct. | R | RA | Note |
|---|---|---|---|---|---|---|---|
| 1st place, gold medalist(s) | Netherlands | 7 | 1 | .875 | 69 | 18 | Qualified for Africa/Europe 2020 Olympic Qualification |
| 2nd place, silver medalist(s) | Italy | 7 | 1 | .875 | 67 | 27 | Qualified for Africa/Europe 2020 Olympic Qualification |
| 3rd place, bronze medalist(s) | Spain | 6 | 2 | .750 | 65 | 40 | Qualified for Africa/Europe 2020 Olympic Qualification |
| 4 | Israel | 5 | 3 | .625 | 50 | 48 | Qualified for Africa/Europe 2020 Olympic Qualification |
| 5 | Czech Republic | 5 | 3 | .625 | 45 | 37 | Qualified for Africa/Europe 2020 Olympic Qualification |
| 6 | Germany | 3 | 5 | .375 | 41 | 38 | |
| 7 | France | 3 | 4 | .429 | 58 | 52 | |
| 7 | Belgium | 2 | 5 | .286 | 31 | 65 | |
| 9 | Great Britain | 5 | 4 | .556 | 52 | 46 | |
| 10 | Austria | 3 | 5 | .375 | 46 | 59 | |
| 11 | Croatia | 1 | 7 | .125 | 28 | 66 | Relegated |
| 12 | Sweden | 0 | 7 | .000 | 18 | 74 | Relegated |

== Awards ==
- MVP: (Netherlands) Ademar Rifaela
- Outstanding defensive player: (Germany) Alexander Schmidt

== Statistics leaders ==
=== Batting ===
| Statistic | Name | Total/Avg |
|---|---|---|
| Batting average* | (Italy) Sebastiano Poma | .533 |
| Hits | (Germany) Marco Cardoso | 14 |
| Runs | (France) Máxime Lefevre (Netherlands) Ademar Rifaela (Austria) Ferdinand Obed | 10 |
| Home runs | (Netherlands) Ademar Rifaela | 6 |
| RBIs | (Netherlands) Ademar Rifaela | 17 |
| Walks | (Netherlands) Kalian Sams | 8 |
| Strikeouts | (Czech Republic) Martin Scheneider | 11 |
| Stolen bases | (United Kingdom) Nateshon Thomas | 5 |
| On-base percentage* | (Austria) Moritz Scheicher | .636 |
| Slugging percentage* | (Netherlands) Ademar Rifaela | 1.111 |
| OPS* | (Austria) Moritz Scheicher | 1.636 |

* Minimum 2.7 plate appearances per game

=== Pitching ===
| Statistic | Name | Total/Avg |
|---|---|---|
| Wins | 5 players | 2 |
| Losses | 4 players | 2 |
| Saves | (Spain) Rhiner Cruz | 2 |
| Innings pitched | (United Kingdom) Michael Roth | 16 2/3 |
| Hits allowed | (Belgium) Artuur Driessens (Sweden) Ben Johnson | 19 |
| Runs allowed | (Belgium) Artuur Driessens | 14 |
| Earned runs allowed | (Sweden) Ben Johnson | 12 |
| ERA* | (Israel) Joey Wagman | 0.00 |
| Walks | (Croatia) José Díaz (Croatia) Pavao Karin | 10 |
| Strikeouts | (Croatia) José Díaz (United Kingdom) Alex Webb | 16 |

* Minimum 1.0 inning pitched per game
