= Baseball at the 2020 Summer Olympics – Qualification =

Six national teams qualified to compete in baseball at the 2020 Summer Olympics in Tokyo (postponed to 2021 due to the COVID-19 pandemic). As host, Japan automatically qualified. Israel also qualified, by winning the Africa/Europe Qualifying Event in September 2019.

In addition, two teams qualified through the November 2019 WBSC Premier12 tournament. Mexico qualified as the best team from the Americas, and South Korea qualified as the best team from Asia or Oceania (other than already-qualified Japan). The United States qualified by winning the Americas Qualifying Event in early June 2021.

The last spot was awarded to the Dominican Republic, for winning the Final Qualifying Tournament in late June 2021.

== Timeline ==
Event	Dates	Location(s)	Berth(s)	Qualified
Host nation	—N/a	—N/a	1	Japan
Africa/Europe Qualifying Event	18–22 September 2019	(Italy) Bologna / Parma	1	Israel
2019 WBSC Premier12	2–17 November 2019	(Japan) Tokyo^{1}	2	Mexico; South Korea
Americas Qualifying Event	31 May–5 June 2021	(United States) Port St. Lucie / West Palm Beach	1	United States
Final Qualifying Tournament	22–26 June 2021	(Mexico) Puebla	1	Dominican Republic
Total			6	

^{1} The WBSC Premier12 was played in Japan, Mexico, South Korea, and Taiwan, with the final in Tokyo.

== Africa/Europe Qualifying Event ==
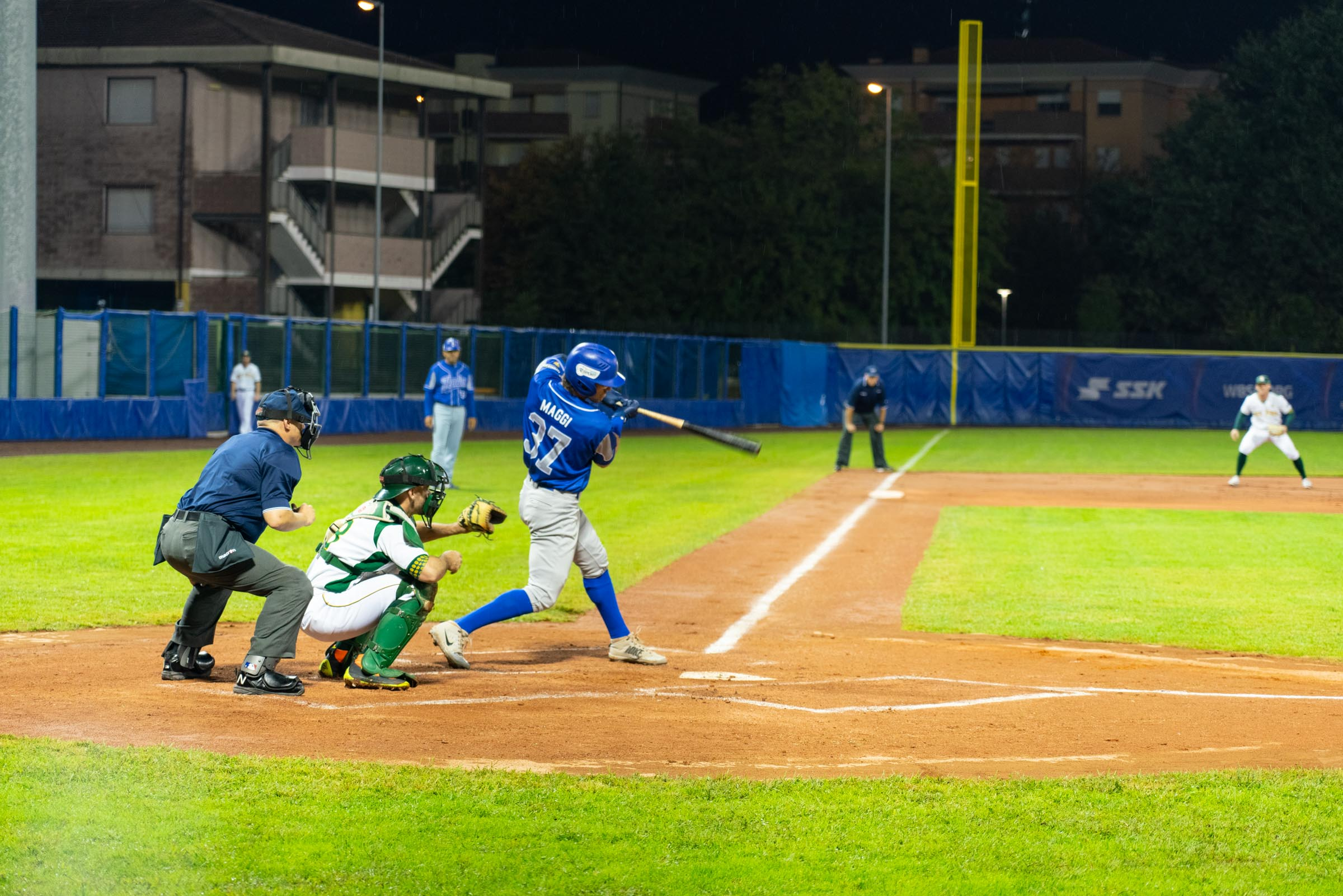
Drew Maggi bats for Italy during the qualifying tournament

Israel qualified for the Olympics by winning the two-continent qualifying tournament for Europe and Africa. The tournament was a round robin. It was held in Parma and Bologna, Italy, from 18 to 22 September 2019. It featured six teams: the Netherlands, Italy, Spain, Israel, and the Czech Republic (the top five teams in the 2019 European Baseball Championship), and South Africa (the winner of the 2019 African Baseball Championship).

Petr Čech of the Czech Republic led the tournament in batting average (.500), and Danny Valencia of Israel led in runs (7), home runs (3), RBIs (9), walks (5), and slugging percentage (1.000). Pitchers Orlando Yntema of the Netherlands and Joey Wagman of Israel tied for the lead with two wins, and Wagman led in complete games (1) and strikeouts (14).

As the winner of the tournament, Israel qualified to compete in the Tokyo Olympics. The second-place team in the event, the Netherlands, received another qualification opportunity in the Final Qualifying Tournament.

=== Standings ===
Pos	Team	Pld	W	L	RF	RA	RD	GB	Qualification
1	Israel	5	4	1	34	11	+23	—	Qualification to 2020 Summer Olympics
2	Netherlands	5	4	1	26	15	+11	—	Qualification to Final Qualifying Tournament
3	Czech Republic	5	3	2	26	17	+9	1	
4	Spain	5	2	3	16	19	−3	2	
5	Italy	5	2	3	23	25	−2	2	
6	South Africa	5	0	5	8	46	−38	4	

Source: WBSC

18 September 2019	Netherlands	4–1	Czech Republic	Nino Cavalli Stadium, Parma; Attendance: 140
18 September 2019		Boxscore		Nino Cavalli Stadium, Parma; Attendance: 140

18 September 2019	South Africa	postponed^{1}	Italy	Nino Cavalli Stadium, Parma
18 September 2019		Boxscore		Nino Cavalli Stadium, Parma

18 September 2019	Spain	0–3	Israel	Gianni Falchi Stadium, Bologna; Attendance: 100
18 September 2019		Boxscore		Gianni Falchi Stadium, Bologna; Attendance: 100

19 September 2019	South Africa	1–7	Spain	Gianni Falchi Stadium, Bologna; Attendance: 100
19 September 2019		Boxscore		Gianni Falchi Stadium, Bologna; Attendance: 100

19 September 2019	Netherlands	1–8	Israel	Nino Cavalli Stadium, Parma; Attendance: 160
19 September 2019		Boxscore		Nino Cavalli Stadium, Parma; Attendance: 160

19 September 2019	Czech Republic	1–5	Italy	Gianni Falchi Stadium, Bologna; Attendance: 864
19 September 2019		Boxscore		Gianni Falchi Stadium, Bologna; Attendance: 864

20 September 2019	South Africa	4–10 (10)	Italy	Nino Cavalli Stadium, Parma; Attendance: 150
20 September 2019		Boxscore		Nino Cavalli Stadium, Parma; Attendance: 150

20 September 2019	South Africa	1–11 (8)	Czech Republic	Nino Cavalli Stadium, Parma; Attendance: 260
20 September 2019		Boxscore		Nino Cavalli Stadium, Parma; Attendance: 260

20 September 2019	Israel	8–2	Italy	Nino Cavalli Stadium, Parma; Attendance: 1,213
20 September 2019		Boxscore		Nino Cavalli Stadium, Parma; Attendance: 1,213

20 September 2019	Spain	2–6	Netherlands	Gianni Falchi Stadium, Bologna; Attendance: 250
20 September 2019		Boxscore		Gianni Falchi Stadium, Bologna; Attendance: 250

21 September 2019	South Africa	1–7	Netherlands	Gianni Falchi Stadium, Bologna; Attendance: 110
21 September 2019		Boxscore		Gianni Falchi Stadium, Bologna; Attendance: 110

21 September 2019	Italy	3–4	Spain	Nino Cavalli Stadium, Parma; Attendance: 1,230
21 September 2019		Boxscore		Nino Cavalli Stadium, Parma; Attendance: 1,230

21 September 2019	Czech Republic	7–4	Israel	Gianni Falchi Stadium, Bologna
21 September 2019		Boxscore		Gianni Falchi Stadium, Bologna

22 September 2019	Israel	11–1 (8)	South Africa	Nino Cavalli Stadium, Parma; Attendance: 225
22 September 2019		Boxscore		Nino Cavalli Stadium, Parma; Attendance: 225

22 September 2019	Spain	3–6	Czech Republic	Nino Cavalli Stadium, Parma; Attendance: 62
22 September 2019		Boxscore		Nino Cavalli Stadium, Parma; Attendance: 62

22 September 2019	Netherlands	8–3	Italy	Gianni Falchi Stadium, Bologna; Attendance: 520
22 September 2019		Boxscore		Gianni Falchi Stadium, Bologna; Attendance: 520

^{1} game postponed 4–4 in 6th inning; continued 20 September.

== 2019 Premier12 ==
The top 12 teams on the WBSC men's baseball ranking list at the end of 2018 qualified for the November 2019 Premier12 competition. Teams from the Americas, Asia, and Oceania were able to qualify for the 2020 Olympics through this tournament. Mexico earned a quota spot as the top finisher from the Americas, and South Korea earned a spot as the top finisher from Asia or Oceania (excluding the already qualified host, Japan).

=== Final standings ===
Rk	Team	W	L
1	Japan	7	1
2	South Korea	5	3
Bronze medal game
3	Mexico	6	2
4	United States	4	4
Eliminated in Super Round
5	Chinese Taipei	4	3
6	Australia	2	5
Eliminated in Group stage
7	Canada	1	2
7	Dominican Republic	1	2
7	Venezuela	1	2
10	Cuba	1	2
10	Netherlands	0	3
10	Puerto Rico	0	3

== Americas Qualifying Event ==
The United States won the eight-team Americas Qualifying Event, and was thereby awarded the one quota spot allocated to the winner of the tournament. The teams that finished in second and third place in the event, the Dominican Republic and Venezuela, progressed to the Final Qualifying Tournament.

All six American teams that had competed in the 2019 Premier12 but did not qualify for the Olympics in that tournament received a place at this Qualifying Event. In addition, the event included the top two finishers at the 2019 Pan American Games that did not qualify for the 2019 Premier12. The event was originally scheduled to be held from 22 to 26 March 2020, in Arizona, but was postponed to 31 May through 5 June 2021 in Port St. Lucie and West Palm Beach, Florida, due to the COVID-19 pandemic.

Canada, the Dominican Republic, the US, and Venezuela advanced to the four-team Super Round. Canada came in fourth, and was thus eliminated from possible Olympic qualification.

Jeison Guzman of the Dominican Republic led the tournament in batting average (.571), Julio Rodríguez of the DR led in runs (7), José Bautista of the DR led in walks (6), and Juan Francisco of the DR led in home runs (4) and RBIs (9).

=== Qualification ===
2019 Premier12

- United States
- Cuba
- Canada
- Puerto Rico
- Venezuela
- Dominican Republic

2019 Pan American Games

- Colombia
- Nicaragua

=== Group A ===
Pos	Team	Pld	W	L	RF	RA	RD	GB	Qualification
1	United States	2	2	0	15	7	+8	—	Advance to Super Round
2	Dominican Republic	3	2	1	24	13	+11	0.5	Advance to Super Round
3	Nicaragua	3	1	2	11	26	−15	1.5	
4	Puerto Rico	2	0	2	8	12	−4	2	

Source: WBSC

31 May 2021	Puerto Rico	2–5	Dominican Republic	Clover Park, Port St. Lucie; Attendance: 2,835
31 May 2021		Boxscore		Clover Park, Port St. Lucie; Attendance: 2,835

31 May 2021	United States	7–1	Nicaragua	Clover Park, Port St. Lucie; Attendance: 3,500
31 May 2021		Boxscore		Clover Park, Port St. Lucie; Attendance: 3,500

1 June 2021	Nicaragua	7–6 (10)	Puerto Rico	FITTEAM Ballpark of the Palm Beaches, West Palm Beach; Attendance: 748
1 June 2021		Boxscore		FITTEAM Ballpark of the Palm Beaches, West Palm Beach; Attendance: 748

1 June 2021	Dominican Republic	6–8	United States	FITTEAM Ballpark of the Palm Beaches, West Palm Beach; Attendance: 200
1 June 2021		Boxscore		FITTEAM Ballpark of the Palm Beaches, West Palm Beach; Attendance: 200

2 June 2021	Nicaragua	3–13 (8)	Dominican Republic	Clover Park, Port St. Lucie; Attendance: 892
2 June 2021		Boxscore		Clover Park, Port St. Lucie; Attendance: 892

3 June 2021	Puerto Rico	1–6 (abandoned due to rain)	United States	Clover Park, Port St. Lucie; Attendance: 0
3 June 2021		Boxscore		Clover Park, Port St. Lucie; Attendance: 0

=== Group B ===
Pos	Team	Pld	W	L	RF	RA	RD	GB	Qualification
1	Venezuela	3	3	0	14	7	+7	—	Advance to Super Round
2	Canada	3	2	1	13	10	+3	1	Advance to Super Round
3	Cuba	3	1	2	26	15	+11	2	
4	Colombia	3	0	3	5	26	−21	3	

Source: WBSC

31 May 2021	Venezuela	6–5	Cuba	FITTEAM Ballpark of the Palm Beaches, West Palm Beach; Attendance: 3,629
31 May 2021		Boxscore		FITTEAM Ballpark of the Palm Beaches, West Palm Beach; Attendance: 3,629

31 May 2021	Colombia	0–7	Canada	FITTEAM Ballpark of the Palm Beaches, West Palm Beach; Attendance: 1,042
31 May 2021		Boxscore		FITTEAM Ballpark of the Palm Beaches, West Palm Beach; Attendance: 1,042

1 June 2021	Colombia	2–3	Venezuela	Clover Park, Port St. Lucie; Attendance: 513
1 June 2021		Boxscore		Clover Park, Port St. Lucie; Attendance: 513

1 June 2021	Canada	6–5	Cuba	Clover Park, Port St. Lucie; Attendance: 2,503
1 June 2021		Boxscore		Clover Park, Port St. Lucie; Attendance: 2,503

2 June 2021	Canada	0–5	Venezuela	FITTEAM Ballpark of the Palm Beaches, West Palm Beach; Attendance: 528
2 June 2021		Boxscore		FITTEAM Ballpark of the Palm Beaches, West Palm Beach; Attendance: 528

2 June 2021	Cuba	16–3 (7)	Colombia	FITTEAM Ballpark of the Palm Beaches, West Palm Beach; Attendance: 2,031
2 June 2021		Boxscore		FITTEAM Ballpark of the Palm Beaches, West Palm Beach; Attendance: 2,031

=== Super Round ===
Pos	Team	Pld	W	L	RF	RA	RD	GB	Qualification
1	United States	3	3	0	22	9	+13	—	Qualify to 2020 Summer Olympics
2	Dominican Republic	3	2	1	26	17	+9	1	Advance to Final Qualifying Tournament
3	Venezuela	3	1	2	11	18	−7	2	Advance to Final Qualifying Tournament
4	Canada	3	0	3	6	21	−15	3	

Source: WBSC

4 June 2021	Dominican Republic	14–4	Venezuela	FITTEAM Ballpark of the Palm Beaches, West Palm Beach; Attendance: 829
4 June 2021		Boxscore		FITTEAM Ballpark of the Palm Beaches, West Palm Beach; Attendance: 829

4 June 2021	Canada	1–10	United States	FITTEAM Ballpark of the Palm Beaches, West Palm Beach; Attendance: 839
4 June 2021		Boxscore		FITTEAM Ballpark of the Palm Beaches, West Palm Beach; Attendance: 839

5 June 2021	Dominican Republic	6–5	Canada	Clover Park, Port St. Lucie; Attendance: 2,000
5 June 2021		Boxscore		Clover Park, Port St. Lucie; Attendance: 2,000

5 June 2021	United States	4–2	Venezuela	Clover Park, Port St. Lucie; Attendance: 2,202
5 June 2021		Boxscore		Clover Park, Port St. Lucie; Attendance: 2,202

=== Statistical leaders ===
==== Batting ====
Statistic	Name	Total/Avg
Batting average*	(Dominican Republic) Jeison Guzmán	.571
Hits	(Dominican Republic) Julio Rodríguez	11
Runs	(Dominican Republic) Julio Rodríguez	7
Home runs	(Dominican Republic) Juan Francisco	4
Runs batted in	(Dominican Republic) Juan Francisco	9
Strikeouts	(Canada) Wesley Darvill	10
On-base percentage*	(Cuba) Roel Santos	1.111
Slugging percentage*	(Cuba) Raico Santos Almeida	.600
OPS*	(Cuba) Raico Santos Almeida	1.711

* Minimum 2.7 plate appearances per team game

==== Pitching ====
Statistic	Name	Total/Avg
Saves	2 tied with (Note: David Robertson, Jairo Asencio)	2
Innings pitched	(Dominican Republic) Raúl Valdés	14.0
Hits allowed	(Venezuela) Aníbal Sánchez	14
Runs allowed	(Canada) Travis Grant Seabrooke	7
Walks	(Cuba) Liván Moinelo	5
Strikeouts	(Dominican Republic) Raúl Valdés	12

== Final qualifying tournament ==
The Dominican Republic, as the winner of the Final Qualifying Tournament in late June 2021 in Mexico, earned the final qualification spot for the 2020 Olympics. Three teams took part. Six teams were originally scheduled to take part: the runner-up from the Africa/Europe Qualifying Event, the runner-up and third-place team from the Americas Qualifying Event, the top two finishers from the 2019 Asian Baseball Championship that had not already qualified for the Olympics, and Australia (which was chosen to represent the Oceania region).

The tournament was originally scheduled to be held from 1 to 5 April 2020 in Taichung and Douliu, Taiwan. It was initially postponed to 17 to 21 June, due to the COVID-19 pandemic. Following the decision to postpone the 2020 Olympic Games to 2021 due to the pandemic, the WBSC again postponed the tournament, this time to 16 to 20 June 2021 in Taiwan. In May 2021, due to a spike in domestically transmitted COVID-19 cases in Taiwan and new restrictions imposed by the local government, the WBSC moved the final qualifier to 22 to 26 June 2021, in the city of Puebla, Mexico.

On 7 May 2021, China withdrew from the competition. Chinese Taipei also withdrew on 2 June 2021, due to concerns related to player safety from COVID-19 in Mexico, leaving four teams and no Asian representation at the tournament. On 8 June 2021, Australia withdrew from the tournament, due to logistical issues caused by COVID-19, leaving just three teams to compete.

=== Qualification ===
2020 Americas Qualifying Event

- Dominican Republic (runner-up)
- Venezuela (third place)

2019 Africa/Europe Qualifying Event

- Netherlands (runner-up)

2019 Asian Baseball Championship

- ~~Chinese Taipei (winner)~~ (withdrew)
- ~~China (third place)~~ (withdrew)

Oceania representative

- ~~Australia~~ (withdrew)

=== Round robin ===
Pos	Team	Pld	W	L	RF	RA	RD	GB	Qualification
1	Dominican Republic	2	2	0	14	10	+4	—	Advance to Final
2	Venezuela	2	1	1	16	13	+3	1	Advance to Semifinal
3	Netherlands	2	0	2	6	13	−7	2	Advance to Semifinal

Source: WBSC

22 June 2021	Venezuela	7–10	Dominican Republic	Estadio Hermanos Serdán, Puebla; Attendance: 1,790
22 June 2021		Boxscore		Estadio Hermanos Serdán, Puebla; Attendance: 1,790

23 June 2021	Netherlands	3–9	Venezuela	Estadio Hermanos Serdán, Puebla; Attendance: 1,114
23 June 2021		Boxscore		Estadio Hermanos Serdán, Puebla; Attendance: 1,114

24 June 2021	Dominican Republic	4–3	Netherlands	Estadio Hermanos Serdán, Puebla; Attendance: 942
24 June 2021		Boxscore		Estadio Hermanos Serdán, Puebla; Attendance: 942

=== Semifinal ===
25 June 2021	Venezuela	10–0 (7)	Netherlands	Estadio Hermanos Serdán, Puebla; Attendance: 1,116
25 June 2021		Boxscore		Estadio Hermanos Serdán, Puebla; Attendance: 1,116

=== Final ===
26 June 2021	Dominican Republic	8–5	Venezuela	Estadio Hermanos Serdán, Puebla; Attendance: 2,691
26 June 2021		Boxscore		Estadio Hermanos Serdán, Puebla; Attendance: 2,691

== See also ==
- Softball at the 2020 Summer Olympics – Qualification
