= 2019 European Champions Cup (baseball) =

2019 Edition of the European Cup of baseball

Tournament details
- Country: Italy
- City: Bologna
- Dates: 4–8 June
- Teams: 8

Final positions
- Champions: (Italy) Fortitudo Bologna
- Runners-up: (Netherlands) Amsterdam Pirates
- Third place: (Netherlands) Curaçao Neptunus
- Fourth place: (Italy) Parma Baseball

Awards
- MVP: (Venezuela) Osman Marval

The 2019 European Champions Cup was the 56th iteration of the European Champions Cup, the top European baseball club competition organized by the Confederation of European Baseball. It was held in Bologna and Castenaso, Italy from 4 to 8 June 2019.

The cup featured eight teams: hosts Fortitudo Bologna and Parma Baseball from Italy, Deurne Spartans from Belgium, Arrows Ostrava from the Czech Republic, Rouen Huskies from France, Bonn Capitals from Germany and Amsterdam Pirates and Curaçao Neptunus from the Netherlands.

Fortitudo Bologna won the tournament after defeating Amsterdam Pirates 8–0 in the final game. Curaçao Neptunus finished third with a victory over Parma Baseball 9–0. Catcher Osman Marval from Fortitudo Bologna received the Most Valuable Player award of the tournament.

== Venues ==
(Italy) Bologna	(Italy) Castenaso
Gianni Falchi Stadium	Teseo Bondi Stadium
Capacity: 2,500	

== First round ==
=== Group A ===
Pos	Team	Pld	W	L	RF	RA	RD	PCT	GB	Qualification
1	(Netherlands) Curaçao Neptunus	3	3	0	24	8	+16	1.000	—	Advance to Semifinals
2	(Italy) Parma Baseball	3	2	1	39	13	+26	.667	1	Advance to Semifinals
3	(France) Rouen Huskies	3	1	2	17	38	−21	.333	2	
4	(Germany) Bonn Capitals	3	0	3	21	42	−21	.000	3	

Source: Confederation of European Baseball

Date	Local time	Road team	Score	Home team	Inn.	Venue	Game duration	Attendance	Boxscore
4 Jun 2019	14:30	Curaçao Neptunus (Netherlands)	2–1	(Italy) Parma Baseball		Gianni Falchi Stadium	2:57	200	Boxscore
4 Jun 2019	17:00	Rouen Huskies (France)	11–9	(Germany) Bonn Capitals		Teseo Bondi Stadium	3:15	60	Boxscore
5 Jun 2019	10:30	Bonn Capitals (Germany)	4–14	(Netherlands) Curaçao Neptunus	7	Gianni Falchi Stadium	2:52	70	Boxscore
5 Jun 2019	17:00	Parma Baseball (Italy)	21–3	(France) Rouen Huskies	5	Teseo Bondi Stadium	1:55	120	Boxscore
6 Jun 2019	11:00	Parma Baseball (Italy)	17–8	(Germany) Bonn Capitals		Teseo Bondi Stadium	3:50	55	Boxscore
6 Jun 2019	14:30	Rouen Huskies (France)	3–8	(Netherlands) Curaçao Neptunus		Gianni Falchi Stadium	2:50	130	Boxscore

=== Group B ===
Pos	Team	Pld	W	L	RF	RA	RD	PCT	GB	Qualification
1	(Netherlands) Amsterdam Pirates	3	3	0	41	3	+38	1.000	—	Advance to Semifinals
2	(Italy) Fortitudo Bologna (H)	3	2	1	28	7	+21	.667	1	Advance to Semifinals
3	(Czech Republic) Arrows Ostrava	3	1	2	24	40	−16	.333	2	
4	(Belgium) Deurne Spartans	3	0	3	2	45	−43	.000	3	

Source: Confederation of European Baseball
(H) Hosts

Date	Local time	Road team	Score	Home team	Inn.	Venue	Game duration	Attendance	Boxscore
4 Jun 2019	11:00	Deurne Spartans (Belgium)	2–17	(Czech Republic) Arrows Ostrava	6	Teseo Bondi Stadium	2:10	50	Boxscore
4 Jun 2019	20:30	Fortitudo Bologna (Italy)	1–2	(Netherlands) Amsterdam Pirates		Gianni Falchi Stadium	2:21	1,300	Boxscore
5 Jun 2019	15:30	Amsterdam Pirates (Netherlands)	17–0	(Belgium) Deurne Spartans	5	Gianni Falchi Stadium	1:27	60	Boxscore
5 Jun 2019	20:30	Arrows Ostrava (Czech Republic)	5–16	(Italy) Fortitudo Bologna	7	Gianni Falchi Stadium	2:43	1,000	Boxscore
6 Jun 2019	17:00	Arrows Ostrava (Czech Republic)	2–22	(Netherlands) Amsterdam Pirates	5	Teseo Bondi Stadium	2:03	67	Boxscore
6 Jun 2019	20:30	Fortitudo Bologna (Italy)	11–0	(Belgium) Deurne Spartans	8	Gianni Falchi Stadium	2:30	300	Boxscore

== Knockout stage ==
Semifinals
7 June – Bologna
(Netherlands) Amsterdam Pirates	8
(Italy) Parma Baseball	4
7 June – Bologna
(Netherlands) Curaçao Neptunus	3
(Italy) Fortitudo Bologna	10

Final
8 June – Bologna
(Netherlands) Amsterdam Pirates	0
(Italy) Fortitudo Bologna	8
Bronze medal game
8 June – Bologna
(Netherlands) Curaçao Neptunus	9
(Italy) Parma Baseball	0

=== Semifinals ===
Date	Local time	Road team	Score	Home team	Inn.	Venue	Game duration	Attendance	Boxscore
7 Jun 2019	14:30	Parma Baseball (Italy)	4–8	(Netherlands) Amsterdam Pirates		Gianni Falchi Stadium	3:00	300	Boxscore
7 Jun 2019	20:30	Fortitudo Bologna (Italy)	10–3	(Netherlands) Curaçao Neptunus		Gianni Falchi Stadium	2:54	1,800	Boxscore

=== Bronze medal game ===
Date	Local time	Road team	Score	Home team	Inn.	Venue	Game duration	Attendance	Boxscore
8 Jun 2019	20:30	Parma Baseball (Italy)	0–9	(Netherlands) Curaçao Neptunus	6	Gianni Falchi Stadium	2:09	250	Boxscore

=== Final ===
Date	Local time	Road team	Score	Home team	Inn.	Venue	Game duration	Attendance	Boxscore
8 Jun 2019	20:30	Fortitudo Bologna (Italy)	8–0	(Netherlands) Amsterdam Pirates		Gianni Falchi Stadium	3:05	3,000	Boxscore

== Relegation ==
=== First round ===
Date	Local time	Road team	Score	Home team	Inn.	Venue	Game duration	Attendance	Boxscore
7 Jun 2019	11:00	Deurne Spartans (Belgium)	4–5	(France) Rouen Huskies		Teseo Bondi Stadium	2:50	60	Boxscore
7 Jun 2019	17:00	Bonn Capitals (Germany)	7–6	(Czech Republic) Arrows Ostrava	10	Teseo Bondi Stadium	3:10	40	Boxscore

=== Relegation game ===
Date	Local time	Road team	Score	Home team	Inn.	Venue	Game duration	Attendance	Boxscore
8 Jun 2019	17:00	Deurne Spartans (Belgium)	3–13	(Czech Republic) Arrows Ostrava	7	Teseo Bondi Stadium	2:49	50	Boxscore

== Statistical leaders ==
=== Batting ===
Stat	Name	Team	Total
AVG	(United States) Alex Rubanowitz	(Czech Republic) Arrows Ostrava	.625
H	(United States) Alex Rubanowitz	(Czech Republic) Arrows Ostrava	10
R	(Netherlands) Sharlon Schoop	(Netherlands) Amsterdam Pirates	8
HR	(Netherlands) Denzel Richardson	(Netherlands) Amsterdam Pirates	3
HR	(Australia) Wilson Lee	(Germany) Bonn Capitals	3
RBI	(Venezuela) José Ferrini	(Italy) Fortitudo Bologna	9
SLG	(Australia) Wilson Lee	(Germany) Bonn Capitals	1.200

=== Pitching ===
Stat	Name	Team	Total
W	16 tied with		1
SV	(Netherlands) Tom Stuifbergen	(Netherlands) Amsterdam Pirates	1
IP	(Venezuela) Anderson Gerdel	(Belgium) Deurne Spartans	11.2
ERA	5 tied with		0.00
SO	(Venezuela) Anderson Gerdel	(Belgium) Deurne Spartans	15

== Final standings ==
Pos	Team	W	L
Gold medal	(Italy) Fortitudo Bologna	4	1
Silver medal	(Netherlands) Amsterdam Pirates	3	2
Bronze medal	(Netherlands) Curaçao Neptunus	4	1
4	(Italy) Parma Baseball	2	3
5	(France) Rouen Huskies	2	2
6	(Germany) Bonn Capitals	1	3
7	(Czech Republic) Arrows Ostrava	2	3
8	(Belgium) Deurne Spartans	0	5
