= 2023 European Champions Cup (baseball) =

Baseball championship

Tournament details
- Country: Netherlands
- Cities: Amsterdam; Bussum
- Dates: 6–10 June
- Teams: 8

Final positions
- Champions: (Netherlands) HCAW Bussum
- Runners-up: (Italy) Parma Baseball
- Third place: (Netherlands) Amsterdam Pirates
- Fourth place: (Germany) Bonn Capitals

Awards
- MVP: (Netherlands) Victor Draijer

The 2023 European Champions Cup was a European baseball competition, held from 4 to 10 June 2023, in Amsterdam and Bussum, Netherlands. This is the sixtieth iteration of the Cup since its inaugural tournament in 1963.

It featured the top eight professional baseball teams on the continent, and it was the first tier of the four competitions organized by WBSC Europe, alongside the second-tier Confederation Cup, third-tier Federation Cup, and fourth-tier Federation Cup Qualifiers, all of which operate with a promotion and relegation system for its federations.

The defending champions were Italian club Parma. The last place at the end of the tournament was relegated to the 2024 second-tier Confederation Cup.

HCAW Bussum won the tournament after defeating Parma in the final, 11–4. Amsterdam Pirates claimed the bronze, defeating Bonn Capitals 12–6 in the third place game. HCAW outfielder Victor Draijer was honored with the Most Valuable Player award of the tournament.

== List of competing teams ==
(Italy) Parma Baseball Club (2022 champions)	(Germany) Paderborn Untouchables
(Netherlands) HCAW Bussum (host club)	(Czech Republic) Arrows Ostrava
(Netherlands) Amsterdam Pirates (host club)	(Czech Republic) Draci Brno
(Germany) Bonn Capitals	(France) Rouen Huskies

== Venues ==
Group A	Group B
(Netherlands) Amsterdam	(Netherlands) Bussum
Loek Loevendie Ballpark	Rob Hoffmann Vallei
Capacity: 400	Capacity: 1,000

== First round ==
Qualified for Final Four
Qualified for Bottom Four

=== Group A ===
Rk	Team	W	L	Pct.	GB
1	(Italy) Parma Baseball Club	3	0	1.000	0
2	(Netherlands) Amsterdam Pirates	1	2	0.333	2
3	(Czech Republic) Draci Brno	1	2	0.333	2
4	(Germany) Paderborn Untouchables	1	2	0.333	2

Date	Local time	Road team	Score	Home team	Inn.	Venue	Game duration	Attendance	Boxscore
June 6, 2023	15:00	Paderborn Untouchables (Germany)	0–13	(Italy) Parma Baseball Club	8	Loek Loevendie Ballpark	2:13	125	Boxscore
June 6, 2023	19:30	Amsterdam Pirates (Netherlands)	3–4	(Czech Republic) Draci Brno	9	Loek Loevendie Ballpark	2:41	275	Boxscore
June 7, 2023	15:00	Paderborn Untouchables (Germany)	4–2	(Czech Republic) Draci Brno	9	Loek Loevendie Ballpark	2:47	175	Boxscore
June 7, 2023	19:30	Parma Baseball Club (Italy)	7–5	(Netherlands) Amsterdam Pirates	10	Loek Loevendie Ballpark	3:19	550	Boxscore
June 8, 2023	14:00	Draci Brno (Czech Republic)	2–6	(Italy) Parma Baseball Club	9	Loek Loevendie Ballpark	2:32	150	Boxscore
June 8, 2023	19:30	Amsterdam Pirates (Netherlands)	15–0	(Germany) Paderborn Untouchables	7	Loek Loevendie Ballpark	2:34	550	Boxscore

=== Group B ===
Rk	Team	W	L	Pct.	GB
1	(Netherlands) HCAW Bussum	2	1	0.667	0
2	(Germany) Bonn Capitals	2	1	0.667	0
3	(Czech Republic) Arrows Ostrava	2	1	0.667	0
4	(France) Rouen Huskies	0	3	0.000	2

Date	Local time	Road team	Score	Home team	Inn.	Venue	Game duration	Attendance	Boxscore
June 6, 2023	15:00	Arrows Ostrava (Czech Republic)	3–1	(Germany) Bonn Capitals	9	Rob Hoffmann Vallei	2:16	125	Boxscore
June 6, 2023	19:00	Rouen Huskies (France)	5–18	(Netherlands) HCAW Bussum	7	Rob Hoffmann Vallei	2:44	350	Boxscore
June 7, 2023	15:00	Rouen Huskies (France)	2–7	(Germany) Bonn Capitals	9	Rob Hoffmann Vallei	2:46	200	Boxscore
June 7, 2023	19:00	HCAW Bussum (Netherlands)	12–0	(Czech Republic) Arrows Ostrava	7	Rob Hoffmann Vallei	2:11	450	Boxscore
June 8, 2023	15:00	Arrows Ostrava (Czech Republic)	5–1	(France) Rouen Huskies	9	Rob Hoffmann Vallei	2:23	125	Boxscore
June 8, 2023	19:00	Bonn Capitals (Germany)	5–2	(Netherlands) HCAW Bussum	9	Rob Hoffmann Vallei	2:36	450	Boxscore

== Final Four ==
=== Semifinals ===
Date	Local time	Road team	Score	Home team	Inn.	Venue	Game duration	Attendance	Boxscore
June 9, 2023	19:00	Amsterdam Pirates (Netherlands)	3–4	(Netherlands) HCAW Bussum	10	Rob Hoffmann Vallei	3:01		Boxscore
June 9, 2023	19:30	Bonn Capitals (Germany)	3–13	(Italy) Parma Baseball Club	7	Loek Loevendie Ballpark	2:41	350	Boxscore

=== 3rd place game ===
Date	Local time	Road team	Score	Home team	Inn.	Venue	Game duration	Attendance	Boxscore
June 10, 2023	14:00	Bonn Capitals (Germany)	6–12	(Netherlands) Amsterdam Pirates	9	Loek Loevendie Ballpark	3:01	300	Boxscore

=== Final ===
Date	Local time	Road team	Score	Home team	Inn.	Venue	Game duration	Attendance	Boxscore
June 10, 2023	18:00	Parma Baseball Club (Italy)	4–11	(Netherlands) HCAW Bussum	9	Rob Hoffmann Vallei	2:52	650	Boxscore

== Bottom Four ==
=== First round ===
Date	Local time	Road team	Score	Home team	Inn.	Venue	Game duration	Attendance	Boxscore
June 9, 2023	15:00	Rouen Huskies (France)	1–6	(Czech Republic) Draci Brno	9	Loek Loevendie Ballpark	2:49	75	Boxscore
June 9, 2023	15:00	Paderborn Untouchables (Germany)	5–7	(Czech Republic) Arrows Ostrava	9	Rob Hoffmann Vallei	2:24	150	Boxscore

=== 5th place game ===
Date	Local time	Road team	Score	Home team	Inn.	Venue	Game duration	Attendance	Boxscore
June 10, 2023	10:30	Draci Brno (Czech Republic)	14–10	(Czech Republic) Arrows Ostrava	9	Loek Loevendie Ballpark	3:13	65	Boxscore

=== Relegation game ===
Date	Local time	Road team	Score	Home team	Inn.	Venue	Game duration	Attendance	Boxscore
June 10, 2023	10:30	Rouen Huskies (France)	4–6	(Germany) Paderborn Untouchables	9	Rob Hoffmann Vallei	3:05	100	Boxscore

== Statistical leaders ==
=== Batting ===
Stat	Name	Team	Total
AVG	(Netherlands) Delano Selassa	(Netherlands) HCAW Bussum	.550
H	(Netherlands) Delano Selassa	(Netherlands) HCAW Bussum	11
R	(Dominican Republic) Manuel Joseph	(Italy) Parma Baseball	8
HR	15 tied with		1
RBI	(Italy) Cesare Astorri	(Italy) Parma Baseball	11
SLG	(United States) Terrell Joyce	(Germany) Bonn Capitals	.895

=== Pitching ===
Stat	Name	Team	Total
W	20 tied with		1
L	(Netherlands) Pim Vijfvinkel	(Netherlands) Amsterdam Pirates	2
L	(France) Thibault Mercadier	(France) Rouen Huskies	2
SV	(Australia) Wilson Lee	(Germany) Bonn Capitals	2
SV	(Czech Republic) Jan Kozel	(Czech Republic) Arrows Ostrava	2
IP	(Netherlands) Jelle van der Lelie	(Netherlands) Amsterdam Pirates	11.1
ERA	(Venezuela) Jhenderson Hurtado	(Czech Republic) Draci Brno	0.00
ERA	(Netherlands) Lars Huijer	(Netherlands) HCAW Bussum	0.00
ERA	(Czech Republic) Ondřej Satoria	(Czech Republic) Arrows Ostrava	0.00
SO	(France) Quentin Moulin	(France) Rouen Huskies	16

== Final standings ==
Champion
Relegated to Confederation Cup

Rk	Team
1	(Netherlands) HCAW Bussum
2	(Italy) Parma Baseball Club
3	(Netherlands) Amsterdam Pirates
4	(Germany) Bonn Capitals
5	(Czech Republic) Draci Brno
6	(Czech Republic) Arrows Ostrava
7	(Germany) Paderborn Untouchables
8	(France) Rouen Huskies

== See also ==
- European Confederation Cup
- European Baseball Championship
- Asia Series
- Caribbean Series
- Baseball awards § Europe
