= Quintin de Cuba =

Dutch baseball player (born 1987)

Quintin De Cuba

Amsterdam Pirates – No. 53
- Outfielder / Catcher
- Born: September 9, 1987 (age 39); Willemstad, Curaçao
- Bats: Left Throws: Right
- Stats at Baseball Reference
Medals
Men's baseball
Representing Netherlands
World Port Tournament
Silver medal – second place	2015 Netherlands	National team
France International Baseball Tournament
Gold medal – first place	2014 Sénart	National team

Quintin de Cuba (born September 9, 1987) is a Dutch professional baseball player for the Amsterdam Pirates of the Honkbal Hoofdklasse. He played for the Netherlands national team in the 2013 World Baseball Classic and other tournaments and has played for the Sint Maarten national team. de Cuba played in Minor League Baseball from 2007 to 2009.

== Professional career ==
de Cuba signed with the New York Mets in 2006 out of Curaçao. He played in the Dominican Summer League and Venezuelan Summer League in the Mets organization from 2007 to 2009, batting .211 with 10 home runs in 92 games, primarily playing first base.

de Cuba played with Sparta-Feyenoord in the Honkbal Hoofdklasse in 2011, leading the team with three home runs, before joining Kinheim for 2012. He moved on the Pioniers in 2015, then joined Neptunus after the 2017 season. de Cuba won the 2018 European Champions Cup Most Valuable Player, as Neptunus became European champions. He joined HCAW in 2022, then Amsterdam Pirates in 2024. Later in his career, de Cuba was not primarily a catcher.

== International career ==
de Cuba, who was born in Curaçao, has played for the Netherlands national baseball team as well as several national teams for the former Netherlands Antilles. In the 2013 World Baseball Classic, he played in one game, striking out against Masahiko Morifuku then hitting a single and driving in a run off Hideaki Wakui in a 10–6 loss to Japan. He joined the Dutch team in 2012 and also played in the 2012 European Baseball Championship, 2014 France International Baseball Tournament and 2015 World Port Tournament. He led the 2012 European championship with a .643 on-base percentage.

de Cuba played for the Netherlands Antilles national team in the 2010 South American Games, then the Curaçao national team in the 2011 World Port Tournament. He has also played for the Sint Maarten national team in the 2025 Caribbean Baseball Cup.
