= 2021 European Champions Cup (baseball) =

Tournament details
- Country: Czech Republic
- Cities: Ostrava; Frýdek-Místek
- Dates: 13–17 July
- Teams: 8

Final positions
- Champions: (Italy) Parma Baseball
- Runners-up: (Germany) Bonn Capitals
- Third place: (Italy) Fortitudo Bologna
- Fourth place: (Netherlands) Curaçao Neptunus

Awards
- MVP: (Italy) Alex Sambucci

The 2021 European Champions Cup was the 58th iteration of the top European baseball club competition. It was held in Ostrava and Frýdek-Místek, Czech Republic from 13 to 17 July 2021.

The cup featured eight teams: hosts Arrows Ostrava from Czech Republic, Rouen Huskies form France, Bonn Capitals and Heidenheim Heideköpfe from Germany, Fortitudo Bologna and Parma Baseball from Italy and Amsterdam Pirates and Curaçao Neptunus from the Netherlands.

Parma Baseball won the tournament after defeating Bonn Capitals 6–4 in the final game. Fortitudo Bologna claimed the bronze medal with a victory over Curaçao Neptunus 11–9. Infielder Alex Sambucci from Parma Baseball received the Most Valuable Player award of the tournament.

== Venues ==
| (Czech Republic) Ostrava | (Czech Republic) Frýdek-Místek |
|---|---|
| Arrows Park Ostrava | BK Klasik Frýdek-Místek |
| Capacity: 600 | |

== First round ==
=== Group A ===
| Pos | Team | Pld | W | L | RF | RA | RD | PCT | GB | Qualification |
|---|---|---|---|---|---|---|---|---|---|---|
| 1 | (Italy) Fortitudo Bologna | 3 | 3 | 0 | 39 | 18 | +21 | 1.000 | — | Advance to Semifinals |
| 2 | (Netherlands) Curaçao Neptunus | 3 | 2 | 1 | 39 | 27 | +12 | .667 | 1 | Advance to Semifinals |
| 3 | (Germany) Heidenheim Heideköpfe | 3 | 1 | 2 | 27 | 21 | +6 | .333 | 2 | |
| 4 | (France) Rouen Huskies | 3 | 0 | 3 | 11 | 50 | −39 | .000 | 3 | |

Source: WBSC Europe

| Date | Local time | Road team | Score | Home team | Inn. | Venue | Game duration | Attendance | Boxscore |
|---|---|---|---|---|---|---|---|---|---|
| 13 Jul 2021 | 10:30 | Rouen Huskies (France) | 4–14 | (Netherlands) Curaçao Neptunus | 8 | Arrows Park Ostrava | 2:40 | 75 | Boxscore |
| 13 Jul 2021 | 17:00 | Heidenheim Heideköpfe (Germany) | 3–4 | (Italy) Fortitudo Bologna | | BK Klasik Frýdek-Místek | 2:41 | 125 | Boxscore |
| 14 Jul 2021 | 15:00 | Fortitudo Bologna (Italy) | 17–1 | (France) Rouen Huskies | 5 | Arrows Park Ostrava | 2:07 | 85 | Boxscore |
| 15 Jul 2021 | 11:00 | Curaçao Neptunus (Netherlands) | 11–5 | (Germany) Heidenheim Heideköpfe | | BK Klasik Frýdek-Místek | 3:16 | 30 | Boxscore |
| 15 Jul 2021 | 16:00 | Heidenheim Heideköpfe (Germany) | 19–6 | (France) Rouen Huskies | 7 | BK Klasik Frýdek-Místek | 2:33 | 10 | Boxscore |
| 15 Jul 2021 | 17:30 | Curaçao Neptunus (Netherlands) | 14–18 | (Italy) Fortitudo Bologna | 7 | Arrows Park Ostrava | 3:00 | | Boxscore |

=== Group B ===
| Pos | Team | Pld | W | L | RF | RA | RD | PCT | GB | Qualification |
|---|---|---|---|---|---|---|---|---|---|---|
| 1 | (Germany) Bonn Capitals | 3 | 2 | 1 | 26 | 35 | −9 | .667 | — | Advance to Semifinals |
| 2 | (Italy) Parma Baseball | 3 | 2 | 1 | 28 | 19 | +9 | .667 | — | Advance to Semifinals |
| 3 | (Netherlands) Amsterdam Pirates | 3 | 1 | 2 | 27 | 31 | −4 | .333 | 1 | |
| 4 | (Czech Republic) Arrows Ostrava (H) | 3 | 1 | 2 | 32 | 28 | +4 | .333 | 1 | |

Source: WBSC Europe
(H) Hosts

| Date | Local time | Road team | Score | Home team | Inn. | Venue | Game duration | Attendance | Boxscore |
|---|---|---|---|---|---|---|---|---|---|
| 13 Jul 2021 | 15:00 | Bonn Capitals (Germany) | 5–4 | (Italy) Parma Baseball | | Arrows Park Ostrava | 3:03 | 70 | Boxscore |
| 13 Jul 2021 | 19:30 | Arrows Ostrava (Czech Republic) | 6–8 | (Netherlands) Amsterdam Pirates | | Arrows Park Ostrava | 3:02 | 200 | Boxscore |
| 14 Jul 2021 | 10:30 | Amsterdam Pirates (Netherlands) | 13–14 | (Germany) Bonn Capitals | | Arrows Park Ostrava | 3:41 | 50 | Boxscore |
| 15 Jul 2021 | 10:00 | Parma Baseball (Italy) | 13–8 | (Czech Republic) Arrows Ostrava | | Arrows Park Ostrava | 3:44 | 50 | Boxscore |
| 15 Jul 2021 | 13:30 | Parma Baseball (Italy) | 11–6 | (Netherlands) Amsterdam Pirates | | Arrows Park Ostrava | 3:31 | 50 | Boxscore |
| 15 Jul 2021 | 21:00 | Arrows Ostrava (Czech Republic) | 18–7 | (Germany) Bonn Capitals | 7 | Arrows Park Ostrava | 2:50 | 230 | Boxscore |

== Knockout stage ==
Semifinals
16 July – Ostrava
(Italy) Fortitudo Bologna | 4
(Italy) Parma Baseball | 5
16 July – Frýdek-Místek
(Germany) Bonn Capitals | 8
(Netherlands) Curaçao Neptunus | 7

Final
17 July – Ostrava
(Italy) Parma Baseball | 6
(Germany) Bonn Capitals | 4
Bronze medal game
17 July – Ostrava
(Netherlands) Curaçao Neptunus | 9
(Italy) Fortitudo Bologna | 11

=== Semifinals ===
| Date | Local time | Road team | Score | Home team | Inn. | Venue | Game duration | Attendance | Boxscore |
|---|---|---|---|---|---|---|---|---|---|
| 16 Jul 2021 | 15:00 | Parma Baseball (Italy) | 5–4 | (Italy) Fortitudo Bologna | | Arrows Park Ostrava | 2:53 | 70 | Boxscore |
| 16 Jul 2021 | 16:00 | Curaçao Neptunus (Netherlands) | 7–8 | (Germany) Bonn Capitals | | BK Klasik Frýdek-Místek | 3:06 | 101 | Boxscore |

=== Bronze medal game ===
| Date | Local time | Road team | Score | Home team | Inn. | Venue | Game duration | Attendance | Boxscore |
|---|---|---|---|---|---|---|---|---|---|
| 17 Jul 2021 | 15:00 | Fortitudo Bologna (Italy) | 11–9 | (Netherlands) Curaçao Neptunus | | Arrows Park Ostrava | 3:24 | 122 | Boxscore |

=== Final ===
| Date | Local time | Road team | Score | Home team | Inn. | Venue | Game duration | Attendance | Boxscore |
|---|---|---|---|---|---|---|---|---|---|
| 17 Jul 2021 | 19:30 | Bonn Capitals (Germany) | 4–6 | (Italy) Parma Baseball | | Arrows Park Ostrava | 3:26 | 175 | Boxscore |

== Statistical leaders ==
=== Batting ===
| Stat | Name | Team | Total |
|---|---|---|---|
| AVG | (Venezuela) Ericson Leonora | (Italy) Fortitudo Bologna | .600 |
| H | (Venezuela) Ricardo Paolini | (Italy) Parma Baseball | 10 |
| H | (Netherlands) Dwayne Kemp | (Netherlands) Curaçao Neptunus | 10 |
| R | (Netherlands) Dwayne Kemp | (Netherlands) Curaçao Neptunus | 9 |
| HR | (Netherlands) Dwayne Kemp | (Netherlands) Curaçao Neptunus | 6 |
| RBI | (Netherlands) Dwayne Kemp | (Netherlands) Curaçao Neptunus | 15 |
| SLG | (Netherlands) Sicnarf Loopstok | (Netherlands) Amsterdam Pirates | 1.308 |

=== Pitching ===
| Stat | Name | Team | Total |
|---|---|---|---|
| W | (Venezuela) Danny Rondón | (Italy) Parma Baseball | 2 |
| L | 19 tied with | | 1 |
| SV | (Venezuela) Vicente Campos | (Italy) Parma Baseball | 3 |
| IP | (Venezuela) Julio Vivas | (Italy) Parma Baseball | 13.0 |
| ERA | (Netherlands) Shairon Martis | (Netherlands) Amsterdam Pirates | 0.00 |
| SO | (Venezuela) Julio Vivas | (Italy) Parma Baseball | 15 |

== Final standings ==
| Pos | Team | W | L |
|---|---|---|---|
| Gold medal | (Italy) Parma Baseball | 4 | 1 |
| Silver medal | (Germany) Bonn Capitals | 3 | 2 |
| Bronze medal | (Italy) Fortitudo Bologna | 4 | 1 |
| 4 | (Netherlands) Curaçao Neptunus | 2 | 3 |
| 5 | (Netherlands) Amsterdam Pirates | 2 | 2 |
| 6 | (Czech Republic) Arrows Ostrava | 2 | 2 |
| 7 | (Germany) Heidenheim Heideköpfe | 2 | 3 |
| 8 | (France) Rouen Huskies | 0 | 5 |
