= 2018 European Champions Cup (baseball) =

Tournament details
- Country: Netherlands
- City: Rotterdam
- Dates: 6–10 June
- Teams: 8

Final positions
- Champions: (Netherlands) Curaçao Neptunus
- Runners-up: (Italy) A.S.D. Rimini
- Third place: (Italy) Fortitudo Bologna
- Fourth place: (France) Rouen Huskies

Tournament statistics
- Games played: 19
- Attendance: 7,919 (417 per game)

Awards
- MVP: (Netherlands) Quintin de Cuba

The 2018 European Champions Cup was the 55th iteration of the European Champions Cup, the top European baseball club competition organized by the Confederation of European Baseball. It was held in Rotterdam and Capelle aan den IJssel, Netherlands from 6 to 10 June 2018.

The cup featured eight teams: hosts Curaçao Neptunus and Amsterdam Pirates from the Netherlands, Draci Brno from the Czech Republic, Rouen Huskies from France, Heidenheim Heideköpfe from Germany, Fortitudo Bologna and A.S.D. Rimini from Italy and San Marino Baseball from San Marino.

Curaçao Neptunus won the tournament after defeating A.S.D. Rimini 5–0 in the final game. Fortitudo Bologna finished third, after a victory over Rouen Huskues 8–0. Neptunus Catcher Quintin de Cuba received the Most Valuable Player award of the tournament.

== Venues ==
(Netherlands) Rotterdam	(Netherlands) Capelle aan den IJssel
Neptunus Familiestadion	Sportpark Schenkel
Capacity: 2,760	

== First round ==
=== Group A ===
Pos	Team	Pld	W	L	RF	RA	RD	PCT	GB	Qualification
1	(Italy) A.S.D. Rimini	3	2	1	16	10	+6	.667	—	Advance to Semifinals
2	(France) Rouen Huskies	3	2	1	19	15	+4	.667	—	Advance to Semifinals
3	(Netherlands) Amsterdam Pirates	3	1	2	7	13	−6	.333	1	
4	(Germany) Heidenheim Heideköpfe	3	1	2	7	11	−4	.333	1	

Source: Confederation of European Baseball

Date	Local time	Road team	Score	Home team	Inn.	Venue	Game duration	Attendance	Boxscore
6 Jun 2018	13:00	Rouen Huskies (France)	5–12	(Italy) A.S.D. Rimini		Sportpark Schenkel	2:39	327	Boxscore
6 Jun 2018	15:00	Heidenheim Heideköpfe (Germany)	2–4	(Netherlands) Amsterdam Pirates		Neptunus Familiestadion	2:33	315	Boxscore
7 Jun 2018	10:30	Amsterdam Pirates (Netherlands)	1–8	(France) Rouen Huskies		Neptunus Familiestadion	2:50	90	Boxscore
7 Jun 2018	13:00	A.S.D. Rimini (Italy)	1–3	(Germany) Heidenheim Heideköpfe		Sportpark Schenkel	2:38	211	Boxscore
8 Jun 2018	10:30	Heidenheim Heideköpfe (Germany)	2–6	(France) Rouen Huskies		Neptunus Familiestadion	2:41	150	Boxscore
8 Jun 2018	15:00	A.S.D. Rimini (Italy)	3–2	(Netherlands) Amsterdam Pirates		Neptunus Familiestadion	2:47	310	Boxscore

=== Group B ===
Pos	Team	Pld	W	L	RF	RA	RD	PCT	GB	Qualification
1	(Netherlands) Curaçao Neptunus (H)	3	3	0	15	6	+9	1.000	—	Advance to Semifinals
2	(Italy) Fortitudo Bologna	3	2	1	20	10	+10	.667	1	Advance to Semifinals
3	San Marino Baseball	3	1	2	16	26	−10	.333	2	
4	(Czech Republic) Draci Brno	3	0	3	14	23	−9	.000	3	

Source: Confederation of European Baseball
(H) Hosts

Date	Local time	Road team	Score	Home team	Inn.	Venue	Game duration	Attendance	Boxscore
6 Jun 2018	10:30	Draci Brno (Czech Republic)	1–4	(Italy) Fortitudo Bologna		Neptunus Familiestadion	2:32	128	Boxscore
6 Jun 2018	19:30	San Marino Baseball	0–3	(Netherlands) Curaçao Neptunus		Neptunus Familiestadion	2:44	753	Boxscore
7 Jun 2018	15:00	Fortitudo Bologna (Italy)	12–4	San Marino Baseball		Neptunus Familiestadion	3:21	155	Boxscore
7 Jun 2018	19:30	Curaçao Neptunus (Netherlands)	7–2	(Czech Republic) Draci Brno		Neptunus Familiestadion	2:40	524	Boxscore
8 Jun 2018	13:00	San Marino Baseball	12–11	(Czech Republic) Draci Brno		Sportpark Schenkel	3:18	212	Boxscore
8 Jun 2018	19:30	Fortitudo Bologna (Italy)	4–5	(Netherlands) Curaçao Neptunus		Neptunus Familiestadion	2:47	1,155	Boxscore

== Knockout stage ==
Semifinals
9 June – Rotterdam
(Netherlands) Curaçao Neptunus	4
(France) Rouen Huskies	0
9 June – Rotterdam
(Italy) A.S.D. Rimini	2
(Italy) Fortitudo Bologna	1

Final
10 June – Rotterdam
(Netherlands) Curaçao Neptunus	5
(Italy) A.S.D. Rimini	0
Bronze medal game
10 June – Rotterdam
(Italy) Fortitudo Bologna	8
(France) Rouen Huskies	0

=== Semifinals ===
Date	Local time	Road team	Score	Home team	Inn.	Venue	Game duration	Attendance	Boxscore
9 Jun 2018	15:00	Fortitudo Bologna (Italy)	1–2	(Italy) A.S.D. Rimini		Neptunus Familiestadion	2:24	395	Boxscore
9 Jun 2018	19:30	Rouen Huskies (France)	0–4	(Netherlands) Curaçao Neptunus		Neptunus Familiestadion	2:08	910	Boxscore

=== Bronze medal game ===
Date	Local time	Road team	Score	Home team	Inn.	Venue	Game duration	Attendance	Boxscore
10 Jun 2018	13:00	Rouen Huskies (France)	0–8	(Italy) Fortitudo Bologna		Neptunus Familiestadion	2:55	375	Boxscore

=== Final ===
Date	Local time	Road team	Score	Home team	Inn.	Venue	Game duration	Attendance	Boxscore
10 Jun 2018	18:00	A.S.D. Rimini (Italy)	0–5	(Netherlands) Curaçao Neptunus		Neptunus Familiestadion	2:04	1,245	Boxscore

== Relegation ==
=== First round ===
Date	Local time	Road team	Score	Home team	Inn.	Venue	Game duration	Attendance	Boxscore
9 Jun 2018	10:30	Heidenheim Heideköpfe (Germany)	6–5	San Marino Baseball		Neptunus Familiestadion	3:27	204	Boxscore
9 Jun 2018	13:00	Draci Brno (Czech Republic)	8–0	(Netherlands) Amsterdam Pirates		Sportpark Schenkel	2:23	215	Boxscore

=== Relegation game ===
Date	Local time	Road team	Score	Home team	Inn.	Venue	Game duration	Attendance	Boxscore
10 Jun 2018	11:00	Amsterdam Pirates (Netherlands)	8–3	San Marino Baseball		Sportpark Schenkel	3:16	245	Boxscore

== Statistical leaders ==
=== Batting ===
Stat	Name	Team	Total
AVG	(Belgium) Thomas de Wolf	San Marino Baseball	.579
H	(Belgium) Thomas de Wolf	San Marino Baseball	11
R	3 tied with		6
HR	4 tied with		2
RBI	3 tied with		6
SLG	(Belgium) Thomas de Wolf	San Marino Baseball	1.053

=== Pitching ===
Stat	Name	Team	Total
W	4 tied with		2
SV	9 tied with		1
IP	(United States) Wes Roemer	(Czech Republic) Draci Brno	15.0
ERA	5 tied with		0.00
SO	(Netherlands) Orlando Yntema	(Netherlands) Curaçao Neptunus	17

== Final standings ==
Pos	Team	W	L
Gold medal	(Netherlands) Curaçao Neptunus	5	0
Silver medal	(Italy) A.S.D. Rimini	3	2
Bronze medal	(Italy) Fortitudo Bologna	3	2
4	(France) Rouen Huskies	2	3
5	(Czech Republic) Draci Brno	1	3
5	(Germany) Heidenheim Heideköpfe	2	2
7	(Netherlands) Amsterdam Pirates	2	3
8	San Marino Baseball	1	4
