= Bonn Capitals =

German professional baseball team

Logo
Cap insignia

Information
- League: Deutsche Baseball Liga (Nord)
- Location: Bonn, North Rhine-Westphalia
- Ballpark: Baseballstadion Rheinaue
- Founded: 1989
- Nickname: Caps
- League championships: 4 (2018, 2022, 2024, 2026)
- Division championships: 12 (1997, 2015, 2016, 2017, 2018, 2020, 2021, 2022, 2023, 2024, 2025, 2026)
- Colours: Green, gold and white
- President: Udo Schmitz
- Manager: Wilson Lee
- Website: www.capitals.de

Current uniforms
Home	Away

1. Baseball- und Softballclub Bonn Capitals e.V., commonly referred to as Bonn Capitals, is a German baseball and softball club from Bonn, North Rhine-Westphalia, founded on November 8, 1989. Its first men's team has been competing in the DBL (German Baseball League, formerly the Baseball Bundesliga) since 1994 and currently plays in its northern division, the Bundesliga Nord, after initially playing in the southern division until 1996. The women's softball team was promoted to the northern division of the Softball Bundesliga in 2018.

The Capitals have won the northern division championship twelve times, most recently in 2026, and advanced to the finals of the Bundesliga play-offs eight times, winning four times (in 2018, 2022, 2024, and 2026). They were runners-up in the European Cup in 2021, the third German team ever to do so and the first in over a decade. In the 2022 European Cup, the team advanced to the semi-finals before being narrowly defeated by Parma Baseball Club and subsequently secured the third place after defeating San Marino. In 2023, they again lost to Parma in the semi-finals and finished fourth after co-host Amsterdam Pirates won the bronze medal game. In 2025, they advanced to the finals and faced off against Heidenheim, the first time two German teams met in the European Champions Cup finale. The match was held in the Capitals' own Rheinaue Ballpark, where they were defeated 4:8, leaving the Heidenheim Heidenköpfe to become the first German team to win the trophy.

== Club structure ==
The club consists of 16 teams total, including:

- 1st Men's Baseball Team, 1. Bundesliga (1st Division)
- 2nd Men's Baseball Team, 2. Bundesliga (2nd Division)
- 1st Women's Softball Team, Bundesliga
- 2nd Women's Softball Team, Landesliga (State League)

as well as baseball teams playing in the NRW-Liga (State League) and Bezirksliga (District League) and a number of junior teams.

== Women's softball teams ==
The first women's softball team was established in 1992 and played its first season the following year. In 1994, it was disbanded following an accident and would not be reestablished until 2005. In 2018, the reformed team ascended to the Softball Bundesliga. A second team is playing in the Landesliga (State League). Bonn first reached the play-off finale for the German softball championship in 2021, losing to the Wesseling Vermins, but won the Deutschlandpokal Softball in the same year. In 2022, the team again faced Wesseling in the Bundesliga finale and went on to win their first league championship.

Due to winning the Deutschlandpokal in 2021, the Capitals represented Germany in Group A of the 30th Women's European Cup Winners Cup, which was held in Viladecans, Spain between August 15 and 20 in 2022. The 1st Women's Softball Team finished their first participation in an international competition ranked third.

== Ballpark ==
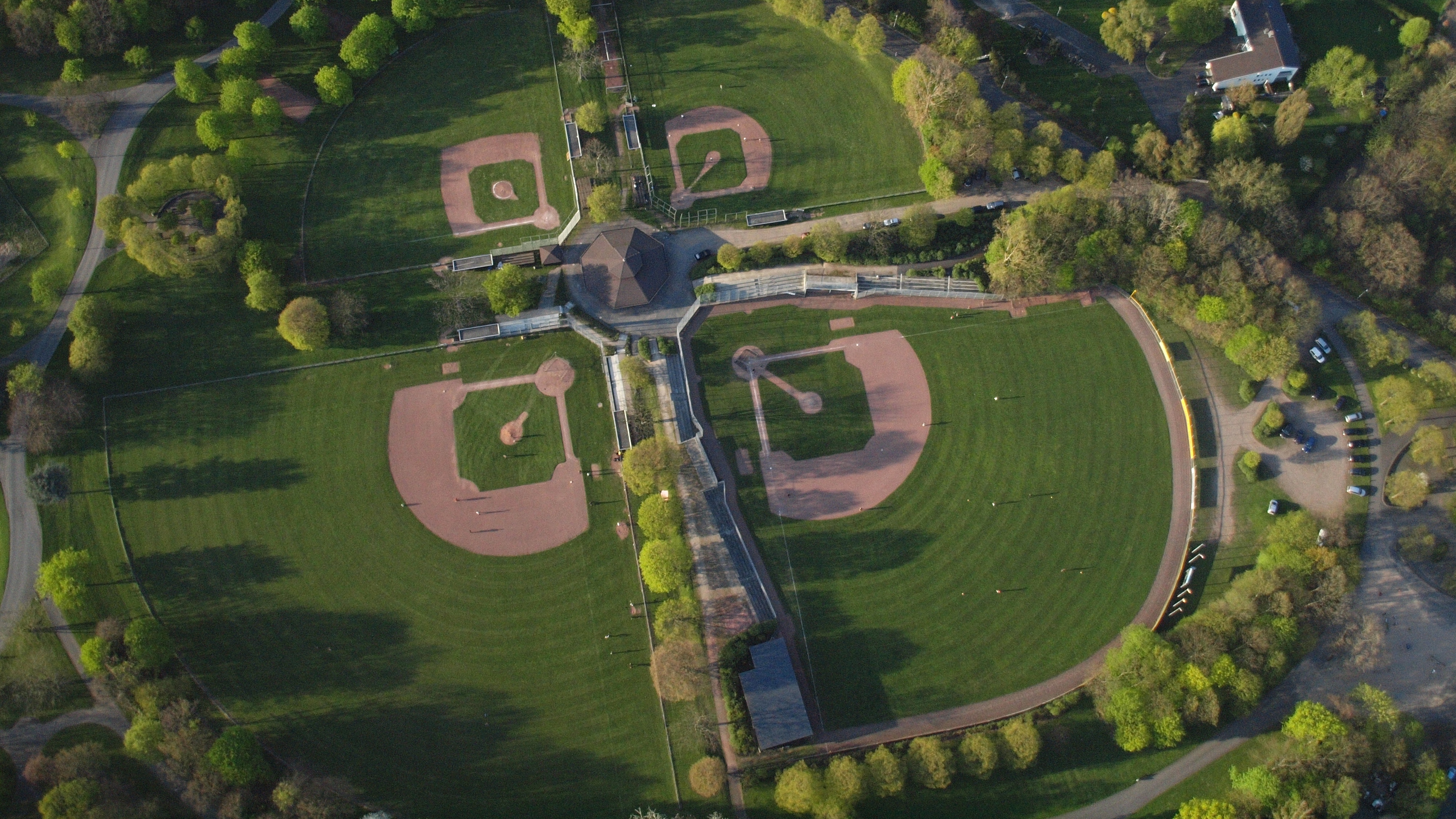
Baseballstadion Rheinaue, home of the Bonn Capitals

The Bonn Capital's ballpark is located in the Rheinaue park in the district of Hochkreuz in northern Bad Godesberg. The facilities consist of two baseball fields and one softball field for professional play as well as a smaller baseball field for students. The fields are arranged in a clover formation.

The Rheinaue Stadium hosted the European Baseball Championship in 2001 and 2019, co-hosting with Solingen on the latter occasion. The 2009 European Junior Baseball Championship also took place here.

It also hosted the 2022 European Champions Cup from 7 to 11 June, wherein the Bonn Capitals competed in Group B and finished third.

== Roster ==
Bonn Capitals roster
Players		Coaches
Pitchers: 4 (Germany) Jakob Schoch; 9 (Germany) Sascha Koch; 14 (Germany) Noah Lindt; 17 (Germany) Simon Groß; 25 (Germany) Markus Solbach; 26 (Germany) Titus von Kapff; 27 (Germany) Paul Schmitz; 28 (Germany) Rickert Koch; 40 (Germany) Matthias Schneider; 41 (Germany) Niklas Rimmel; 47 (Germany) Marcel Giraud; 55 (Germany) Tom Adler	Catchers: 6 (Germany) Maurice Bendrien; 56 (Germany) Eric Kunze; Infielders: 3 Luis Martín; 8 (Spain) Daniel Sánchez; 15 (New Zealand) Daniel Lamb-Hunt; 19 (South Africa) Christiaan Beyers; 30 (Germany) Eric Brenk; 35 (Germany) Simeon Lindt; Outfielders: 16 (United States) Terrell Joyce; 37 Josef Rosenthal; 37 (Germany) Danny Lankhorst	Manager: 21 (Australia) Wilson Lee; Coaches: (United States) Stan Exeter (head coach); 32 (Germany) Clemens Cichocki (coach); 25 (Germany) Markus Solbach (pitching coach); 12 (Germany) Rene Wolf (coach); Roster updated on 19 May 2025

== European Champions Cup record ==
Year	Venue	Finish	Wins	Losses	Win%	Manager
2019	(Italy) Bologna	6th	1	3	.250	(United States) Alex Derhak
2021	(Czech Republic) Ostrava	2nd	3	2	.600	(Germany) Max Schmitz
2022	(Germany) Bonn	3rd	3	2	.600	(Germany) Max Schmitz
2023	(Netherlands) Bussum	4th	2	3	.400	(Australia) Wilson Lee
2025	(Germany) Bonn	2nd	3	1	.750	(United States) Stan Exeter
Total			12	11	.522	
