= Arrows Ostrava =

Logo
Cap insignia

Information
- League: Czech Extraliga
- Location: Ostrava, Czech Republic
- Ballpark: Arrows Park
- Established: 1973; 52 years ago
- League championships: 3 (2018, 2019, 2021)
- Colors: Navy blue, red and white
- Manager: Boris Bokaj

Current uniforms
Home	Away

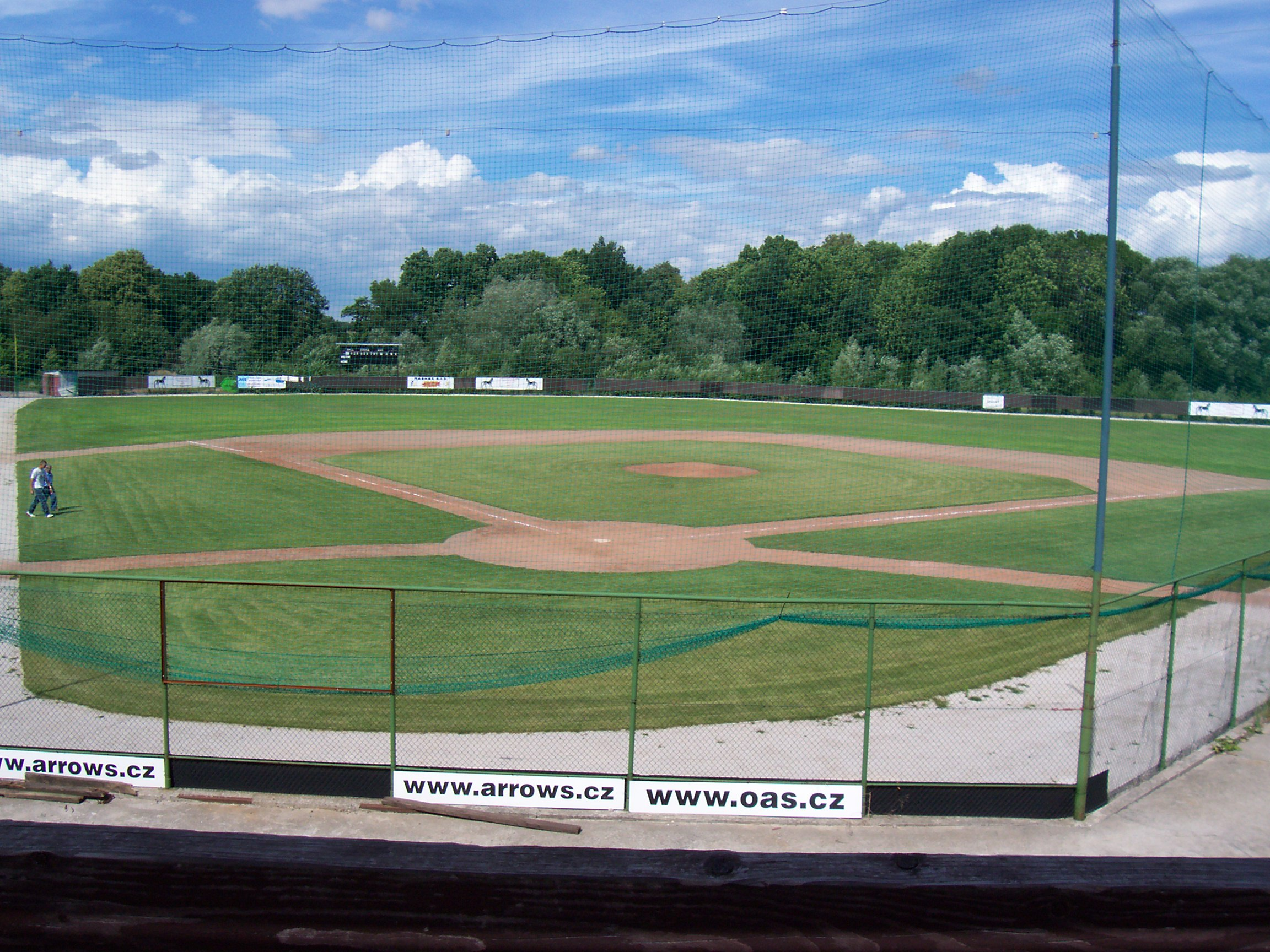
Arrows Park

SKSB Arrows Ostrava, z.s., or simply Arrows Ostrava, is a baseball team from Ostrava, Czech Republic. The team plays in the Czech Extraliga and have won the league title three times in 2018, 2019 and 2021.

== History ==
The roots of Arrows Ostrava go back to 1971, when a group of young people led by Zdeněk Ploskonka started playing softball. Later, in 1973, the club was established as Permon Ostrava, with a baseball and softball section. In 1976 the team changed its name to Permon Sokol Pustkovec and in 1985 to TJ VOKD Poruba. In 1996, the baseball section split from VOKD Poruba and changed its name to SK Arrows Ostrava.

Arrows Ostrava has played in the Extraliga since 1995 and have never been relegated. The club finished as runner-ups in 2005, 2006, 2008, 2009, 2017 and 2020. In 2018, Arrows won its first Czech championship, an achievement they would repeat in 2019 and 2021, all under player-manager Boris Bokaj.

Arrows Ostrava has participated four times in the European Champions Cup, Europe's top baseball club competition. The team made its debut in the 2019 edition, where they finished 7th with a 2–3 record. Arrows hosted the 2021 tournament, finishing 6th with a 2–2 record. The club has had its best performance so far in the 2022 tournament, held in Bonn, where they finished 5th. In their last appearance, in the 2023 cup, Arrows finished 7th with a 3–2 record.

Four Arrows Ostrava players represented Czech Republic at the 2023 World Baseball Classic: pitchers Michal Kovala and Ondřej Satoria, infielder Jakub Kubica and outfielder Jakub Grepl.

== Ballpark ==
Arrows Ostrava plays their home games at the Arrows Park, located in the Poruba district in Ostrava. The complex has two softball fields, a secondary baseball field and the main baseball field, that has a capacity of 600 seated spectators. There is also a restaurant, a conference room, VIP area and a press room.

Arrows Park hosted the 2021 European Champions Cup, the top European competition for baseball clubs, won by Parma Baseball, with the local team finishing sixth.

== Roster ==
Arrows Ostrava roster
Players		Coaches
Pitchers: 42 (Czech Republic) Boris Bokaj; 12 (Czech Republic) Jiří Hikl; 38 (Czech Republic) Michal Kovala; 54 (Czech Republic) Jan Kozel; 31 (Czech Republic) Martin Kubovčík; 3 (Czech Republic) Adrián Mück; 5 (Czech Republic) Matyáš Novotný; 52 (Czech Republic) Matyáš Pjontek; 95 (Czech Republic) Michal Puškár; 97 (Czech Republic) Matěj Satoria; 21 (Czech Republic) Ondřej Satoria; 99 (Czech Republic) Alexandr Šin; 90 (Czech Republic) Filip Votava; 26 (Czech Republic) Marko Vykoukal	Catchers: 27 (Czech Republic) Michael Vykoukal; 67 (Slovakia) Mário Gottschall; Infielders: 14 (United States) Rory Graf-Brennen; 60 (Czech Republic) Matyáš Kozel; 40 (Czech Republic) Jakub Kubica; 18 (Czech Republic) Radim Novotný; 23 (Czech Republic) Marek Slapnička; 25 (Czech Republic) Martin Šmoldas; Outfielders: 16 (Czech Republic) Daniel Černý; 2 (Czech Republic) Jakub Grepl; 96 (Czech Republic) Adam Gřeš; 11 (Czech Republic) David Koláček; 13 (Czech Republic) Jakub Malík; 64 (Czech Republic) Šimon Všetečka; 1 (Czech Republic) Aleš Navrátil	Manager: 42 (Czech Republic) Boris Bokaj; Coaches: 1 (Czech Republic) Aleš Navrátil (coach); Roster updated on 12 January 2024

== Achievements ==
- Extraliga : 3 (2018, 2019, 2021)

== European Champions Cup record ==
Year	Venue	Finish	Wins	Losses	Win%	Manager
2019	(Italy) Bologna	7th	2	3	.400	(Czech Republic) Boris Bokaj
2021	(Czech Republic) Ostrava	6th	2	2	.500	(Czech Republic) Boris Bokaj
2022	(Germany) Bonn	5th	1	3	.250	(Czech Republic) Boris Bokaj
2023	(Netherlands) Bussum	7th	3	2	.600	(Czech Republic) Boris Bokaj
Total			8	10	.444	
