= 2022 European Champions Cup (baseball) =

Baseball tournament iteration

Tournament details
- Country: Germany
- City: Bonn
- Dates: 7–11 June
- Teams: 8

Final positions
- Champions: (Italy) Parma Baseball
- Runners-up: (Netherlands) Amsterdam Pirates
- Third place: (Germany) Bonn Capitals
- Fourth place: San Marino Baseball

Awards
- MVP: (Dominican Republic) Manuel Joseph

The 2022 European Champions Cup was the 59th iteration of the top European baseball club competition. It was held in Bonn, Germany in the Baseballstadion Rheinaue from 7 to 11 June 2022, with the Bonn Capitals acting as hosts.

The cup featured eight teams: Bonn Capitals and Heidenheim Heideköpfe from Germany, Arrows Ostrava and Draci Brno from Czech Republic, Parma Baseball Club from Italy, Amsterdam Pirates and Curaçao Neptunus from the Netherlands and San Marino Baseball Club from San Marino.

Parma Baseball won the tournament twice in a row after winning the 2021 edition. Parma defeated the Amsterdam Pirates in the final, 7–6. Host team Bonn Capitals won the bronze medal, beating San Marino Baseball 6–3 in the bronze medal game. Manuel Joseph from Parma Baseball was awarded the Most Valuable Player of the tournament.

== Venue ==
(Germany) Bonn
Baseballstadion Rheinaue
Capacity: 1,500
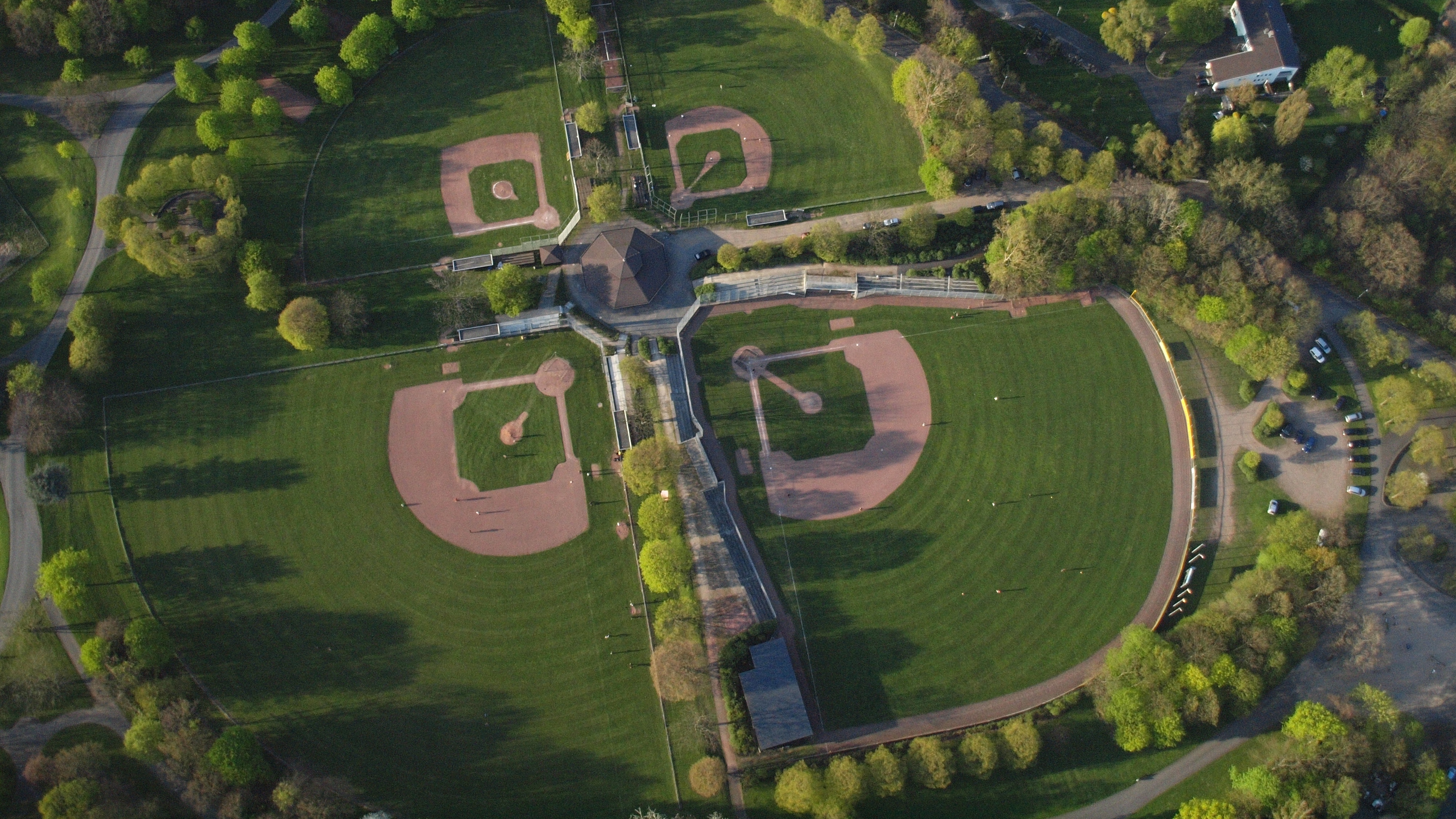

== First round ==
=== Group A ===
Pos	Team	Pld	W	L	RF	RA	RD	PCT	GB	Qualification
1	(Netherlands) Amsterdam Pirates	3	2	1	23	8	+15	.667	—	Advance to Semifinals
2	(Italy) Parma Baseball	3	2	1	27	13	+14	.667	—	Advance to Semifinals
3	(Germany) Heidenheim Heideköpfe	3	2	1	12	16	−4	.667	—	
4	(Czech Republic) Draci Brno	3	0	3	3	28	−25	.000	2	

Source: WBSC Europe

Date	Local time	Road team	Score	Home team	Inn.	Venue	Game duration	Attendance	Boxscore
7 Jun 2022	10:30	Draci Brno (Czech Republic)	1–11	(Italy) Parma Baseball	8	Baseballstadion Rheinaue	2:36	60	Boxscore
7 Jun 2022	12:30	Heidenheim Heideköpfe (Germany)	4–2	(Netherlands) Amsterdam Pirates		Baseballstadion Rheinaue	2:50	70	Boxscore
8 Jun 2022	10:30	Amsterdam Pirates (Netherlands)	9–0	(Czech Republic) Draci Brno	5	Baseballstadion Rheinaue	2:12	50	Boxscore
9 Jun 2022	9:30	Draci Brno (Czech Republic)	2–8	(Germany) Heidenheim Heideköpfe		Baseballstadion Rheinaue	2:30	95	Boxscore
9 Jun 2022	13:00	Parma Baseball (Italy)	12–0	(Germany) Heidenheim Heideköpfe	8	Baseballstadion Rheinaue	2:57	70	Boxscore
9 Jun 2022	16:00	Amsterdam Pirates (Netherlands)	12–4	(Italy) Parma Baseball		Baseballstadion Rheinaue			Boxscore

=== Group B ===
Pos	Team	Pld	W	L	RF	RA	RD	PCT	GB	Qualification
1	(Germany) Bonn Capitals (H)	3	2	1	18	14	+4	.667	—	Advance to Semifinals
2	San Marino Baseball	3	2	1	17	12	+5	.667	—	Advance to Semifinals
3	(Netherlands) Curaçao Neptunus	3	2	1	22	19	+3	.667	—	
4	(Czech Republic) Arrows Ostrava	3	0	3	7	19	−12	.000	2	

Source: WBSC Europe
(H) Hosts

Date	Local time	Road team	Score	Home team	Inn.	Venue	Game duration	Attendance	Boxscore
8 Jun 2022	11:00	San Marino Baseball	4–0	(Czech Republic) Arrows Ostrava	7	Baseballstadion Rheinaue	1:45	20	Boxscore
8 Jun 2022	15:00	Arrows Ostrava (Czech Republic)	3–6	(Germany) Bonn Capitals		Baseballstadion Rheinaue	3:30	140	Boxscore
9 Jun 2022	12:00	Arrows Ostrava (Czech Republic)	4–9	(Netherlands) Curaçao Neptunus		Baseballstadion Rheinaue	2:28	120	Boxscore
9 Jun 2022	16:00	Bonn Capitals (Germany)	8–5	(Netherlands) Curaçao Neptunus		Baseballstadion Rheinaue	3:21	300	Boxscore
9 Jun 2022	20:00	San Marino Baseball	6–4	(Germany) Bonn Capitals		Baseballstadion Rheinaue	3:15	350	Boxscore
10 Jun 2022	10:30	Curaçao Neptunus (Netherlands)	8–7	San Marino Baseball		Baseballstadion Rheinaue	3:58	80	Boxscore

== Knockout stage ==
Semifinals
10 June – Bonn
(Netherlands) Amsterdam Pirates	13
San Marino Baseball	9
10 June – Bonn
(Germany) Bonn Capitals	5
(Italy) Parma Baseball	6

Final
17 July – Bonn
(Netherlands) Amsterdam Pirates	6
(Italy) Parma Baseball	7
Bronze medal game
17 July – Bonn
San Marino Baseball	3
(Germany) Bonn Capitals	6

=== Semifinals ===
Date	Local time	Road team	Score	Home team	Inn.	Venue	Game duration	Attendance	Boxscore
10 Jun 2022	15:00	San Marino Baseball	9–13	(Netherlands) Amsterdam Pirates		Baseballstadion Rheinaue	3:00	200	Boxscore
10 Jun 2022	19:00	Parma Baseball (Italy)	6–5	(Germany) Bonn Capitals	10	Baseballstadion Rheinaue	2:44	600	Boxscore

=== Bronze medal game ===
Date	Local time	Road team	Score	Home team	Inn.	Venue	Game duration	Attendance	Boxscore
12 Jun 2022	15:00	Bonn Capitals (Germany)	6–3	San Marino Baseball	7	Baseballstadion Rheinaue			Boxscore

=== Final ===
Date	Local time	Road team	Score	Home team	Inn.	Venue	Game duration	Attendance	Boxscore
12 Jun 2022	19:00	Parma Baseball (Italy)	7–6	(Netherlands) Amsterdam Pirates		Baseballstadion Rheinaue	3:46	520	Boxscore

== Relegation ==
=== First round ===
Date	Local time	Road team	Score	Home team	Inn.	Venue	Game duration	Attendance	Boxscore
10 Jun 2022	12:00	Arrows Ostrava (Czech Republic)	8–7	(Germany) Heidenheim Heideköpfe		Baseballstadion Rheinaue	3:39	70	Boxscore
10 Jun 2022	16:00	Draci Brno (Czech Republic)	12–6	(Netherlands) Curaçao Neptunus		Baseballstadion Rheinaue	3:16	40	Boxscore

=== Relegation game ===
Date	Local time	Road team	Score	Home team	Inn.	Venue	Game duration	Attendance	Boxscore
11 Jun 2022	12:30	Curaçao Neptunus (Netherlands)	10–8	(Germany) Heidenheim Heideköpfe	10	Baseballstadion Rheinaue	3:45	50	Boxscore

== Statistical leaders ==
=== Batting ===
Stat	Name	Team	Total
AVG	(Netherlands) Sicnarf Loopstok	(Netherlands) Amsterdam Pirates	.647
H	(Netherlands) Delano Selassa	(Netherlands) Amsterdam Pirates	12
R	(Argentina) Exequiel Talevi	(Italy) Parma Baseball	8
HR	(Netherlands) Denzel Richardson	(Netherlands) Amsterdam Pirates	4
RBI	(Dominican Republic) Manuel Joseph	(Italy) Parma Baseball	10
RBI	(Netherlands) Denzel Richardson	(Netherlands) Amsterdam Pirates	10
SLG	(Netherlands) Sicnarf Loopstok	(Netherlands) Amsterdam Pirates	1.176

=== Pitching ===
Stat	Name	Team	Total
W	20 tied with		1
L	(Netherlands) Franklin van Gurp	(Netherlands) Amsterdam Pirates	2
SV	(Canada) Marc-André Habeck	(Italy) Parma Baseball	2
SV	(Lithuania) Dovydas Neverauskas	(Germany) Bonn Capitals	2
IP	(Netherlands) Kaj Timmermans	(Netherlands) Curaçao Neptunus	11.2
ERA	(Dominican Republic) Carlos Contreras	(Italy) Parma Baseball	0.00
ERA	(Canada) Marc-André Habeck	(Italy) Parma Baseball	0.00
ERA	(Italy) Diego Fabiani	(Italy) Parma Baseball	0.00
SO	(Canada) Jared Mortensen	(Germany) Heidenheim Heideköpfe	13

== Final standings ==
Pos	Team	W	L
Gold medal	(Italy) Parma Baseball	4	1
Silver medal	(Netherlands) Amsterdam Pirates	3	2
Bronze medal	(Germany) Bonn Capitals	3	2
4	San Marino Baseball	2	3
5	(Czech Republic) Arrows Ostrava	1	3
5	(Czech Republic) Draci Brno	1	3
7	(Netherlands) Curaçao Neptunus	3	2
8	(Germany) Heidenheim Heideköpfe	2	3
