= 2026 Baseball Champions League Europe =

International baseball club tournament

Tournament details
- Country: Netherlands; Germany; Czechia
- Cities: Rotterdam; Regensburg; Brno
- Venue(s): Neptunus Familiestadion; Armin-Wolf-Arena; Městský baseballový stadion
- Dates: 22–24 May; 26–27 September
- Teams: 8

Final positions
- Champions: (Italy) Parma (1st title)
- Runners-up: (Netherlands) Neptunus
- Third place: (Czech Republic) Draci Brno
- Fourth place: (Spain) Tenerife Marlins

Tournament statistics
- Games played: 16
- Attendance: 6,495 (406 per game)

Awards
- MVP: (Venezuela) Anthony Concepcion

The 2026 Baseball Champions League Europe was the debut edition of the Baseball Champions League Europe, an international competition for baseball clubs organized by the WBSC Europe, part of the World Baseball Softball Confederation (WBSC). It was modelled after the Baseball Champions League Americas, hosted by the WBSC Americas, and featured eight professional teams from five European leagues competing in a round-robin tournament in May followed by a four-team knock-out round in September.

== Venues ==
The home stadiums of two teams, Neptunus and Regensburg Legionäre, hosted the first round of the tournament; the final four was hosted by Draci Brno.

| (Netherlands) Rotterdam | (Germany) Regensburg | (Czech Republic) Brno | 2026 Baseball Champions League Europe is located in Central Europe |
| Neptunus Familiestadion | Armin-Wolf-Arena | Městský baseballový stadion | 2026 Baseball Champions League Europe is located in Central Europe |
| Capacity: 2,460 | Capacity: 3,100 | Capacity: 750 | 2026 Baseball Champions League Europe is located in Central Europe |

== Participating teams ==
| Team | Manager | Means of qualification |
|---|---|---|
| (Czech Republic) Draci Brno | (Czech Republic) Hynek Čapka | 2025 Czech Baseball Extraliga champions |
| (Germany) Heidenheim Heideköpfe | (Germany) Klaus Eckle | 2025 Deutsche Baseball Liga champions |
| (Germany) Regensburg Legionäre | (United States) Matt Vance | 2025 Deutsche Baseball Liga runners-up |
| (Italy) Parma | (Italy) Marcello Saccardi | 2025 Serie A runners-up |
| (Italy) Nettuno BC | (Italy) Roberto De Franceschi | 2025 Serie A quarter-finals |
| (Netherlands) Neptunus | (United States) Greg Muller | 2025 Honkbal Hoofdklasse champions |
| (Netherlands) Twins Oosterhout | (Canada) Rob Ushy | 2025 Honkbal Hoofdklasse third place |
| (Spain) Tenerife Marlins | (Venezuela) Francisco Gonzalez | 2025 División de Honor Oro champions |

== Tournament ==
=== Group stage ===
==== Group A ====
| Pos | Team | Pld | W | L | RF | RA | RD | PCT | GB | Qualification |
|---|---|---|---|---|---|---|---|---|---|---|
| 1 | (Netherlands) Neptunus (H) | 3 | 3 | 0 | 24 | 4 | +20 | 1.000 | — | Advance to Semifinals |
| 2 | (Spain) Tenerife Marlins | 3 | 2 | 1 | 33 | 24 | +9 | .667 | 1 | Advance to Semifinals |
| 3 | (Germany) Heidenheim Heideköpfe | 3 | 1 | 2 | 12 | 26 | −14 | .333 | 2 | |
| 4 | (Italy) Nettuno BC | 3 | 0 | 3 | 13 | 28 | −15 | .000 | 3 | |

Source: WBSC
(H) Hosts

| Date | Local time | Road team | Score | Home team | Inn. | Venue | Game duration | Attendance | Boxscore |
|---|---|---|---|---|---|---|---|---|---|
| 22 May 2026 | 14:00 | Heidenheim Heideköpfe (Germany) | 9–7 | (Italy) Nettuno BC | 9 | Neptunus Familiestadion | 3:04 | 200 | |
| 22 May 2026 | 19:00 | Neptunus (Netherlands) | 15–4 | (Spain) Tenerife Marlins | 8 | Neptunus Familiestadion | 3:01 | 450 | |
| 23 May 2026 | 14:00 | Tenerife Marlins (Spain) | 16–6 | (Italy) Nettuno BC | 9 | Neptunus Familiestadion | 3:03 | 250 | |
| 23 May 2026 | 19:00 | Heidenheim Heideköpfe (Germany) | 0–6 | (Netherlands) Neptunus | 9 | Neptunus Familiestadion | 2:29 | 525 | |
| 24 May 2026 | 12:00 | Tenerife Marlins (Spain) | 13–3 | (Germany) Heidenheim Heideköpfe | 8 | Neptunus Familiestadion | 2:20 | 200 | |
| 24 May 2026 | 17:00 | Nettuno BC (Italy) | 0–3 | (Netherlands) Neptunus | 9 | Neptunus Familiestadion | 2:47 | 700 | |

==== Group B ====
| Pos | Team | Pld | W | L | RF | RA | RD | PCT | GB | Qualification |
|---|---|---|---|---|---|---|---|---|---|---|
| 1 | (Italy) Parma BC | 3 | 3 | 0 | 36 | 9 | +27 | 1.000 | — | Advance to Semifinals |
| 2 | (Czech Republic) Draci Brno | 3 | 2 | 1 | 22 | 22 | 0 | .667 | 1 | Advance to Semifinals |
| 3 | (Netherlands) Twins Oosterhout | 3 | 1 | 2 | 7 | 16 | −9 | .333 | 2 | |
| 4 | (Germany) Regensburg Legionäre (H) | 3 | 0 | 3 | 13 | 31 | −18 | .000 | 3 | |

Source: WBSC
(H) Hosts

| Date | Local time | Road team | Score | Home team | Inn. | Venue | Game duration | Attendance | Boxscore |
|---|---|---|---|---|---|---|---|---|---|
| 22 May 2026 | 14:00 | Parma BC (Italy) | 12–2 | (Czech Republic) Draci Brno | 9 | Armin-Wolf-Arena | 3:42 | 200 | |
| 22 May 2026 | 19:00 | Twins Oosterhout (Netherlands) | 2–1 | (Germany) Regensburg Legionäre | 9 | Armin-Wolf-Arena | 2:48 | 704 | |
| 23 May 2026 | 14:00 | Twins Oosterhout (Netherlands) | 2–6 | (Italy) Parma BC | 9 | Armin-Wolf-Arena | 2:38 | 285 | |
| 23 May 2026 | 19:00 | Regensburg Legionäre (Germany) | 7–11 | (Czech Republic) Draci Brno | 9 | Armin-Wolf-Arena | 3:39 | 704 | |
| 24 May 2026 | 11:00 | Draci Brno (Czech Republic) | 9–3 | (Netherlands) Twins Oosterhout | 9 | Armin-Wolf-Arena | 3:42 | 280 | |
| 24 May 2026 | 15:30 | Regensburg Legionäre (Germany) | 5–18 | (Italy) Parma BC | 7 | Armin-Wolf-Arena | 2:40 | 809 | |

=== Final four ===
Semifinals; September 26
A1 | Neptunus | 10
B2 | Draci Brno | 0
B1 | Parma BC | 5
A2 | Tenerife Marlins | 4

Finals; September 27
A1 | Neptunus | 5
B1 | Parma BC | 11
Third place
A2 | Tenerife Marlins | 1
B2 | Draci Brno | 7

| Date | Local time | Road team | Score | Home team | Inn. | Venue | Game duration | Attendance | Boxscore |
|---|---|---|---|---|---|---|---|---|---|
| 26 September 2026 | 12:00 | Tenerife Marlins (Spain) | 4–5 | (Italy) Parma BC | 9 | Městský baseballový stadion | 2:26 | 253 | |
| 26 September 2026 | 19:00 | Draci Brno (Czech Republic) | 0–10 | (Netherlands) Neptunus | 7 | Městský baseballový stadion | 2:27 | 553 | |
| 27 September 2026 | 11:00 | Draci Brno (Czech Republic) | 7–1 | (Spain) Tenerife Marlins | 9 | Městský baseballový stadion | 2:58 | 167 | |
| 27 September 2026 | 18:00 | Parma BC (Italy) | 11–5 | (Netherlands) Neptunus | 9 | Městský baseballový stadion | 3:07 | 215 | |

== See also ==
- 2026 Baseball Champions League Americas
