= European Champions Cup (baseball) =

Annual baseball tournament

Baseball Confederation Cup
- Current season, competition or edition: 2026 Baseball Confederation Cup
- Sport: Baseball
- Founded: 1963
- No. of teams: 5 (in 2026)
- Continent: Europe
- Most recent champion: (Czech Republic) Hroši Brno (2026)
- Most titles: (Italy) Parma (15 titles)

The Baseball Confederation Cup, formerly called the Baseball European Champions Cup (BECC), Champions Cup and European Cup, is an annual baseball tournament, sanctioned and created by WBSC Europe. The tournament features the top teams of the professional baseball leagues in Europe, and is the first tier of the four competitions organized by WBSC Europe, alongside the second-tier European Cup, third-tier Federation Cup, and fourth-tier Federation Cup Qualifiers, which operate with a promotion and relegation system for its federations.

The first edition of the tournament was held in 1963 and was won by the Picadero JC Barcelona.

Starting in 2008, the tournament was held in two locations. The best two teams from each tournament then compete in the European Champion Cup "Final Four", with the winner receiving the European Champion Cup.

Between 2013 and 2015, the "Final Four" format was replaced with a best-of-three series between the winners of each tournament. In the 2015 tournament, six teams competed in the Paris group, while six other teams competed in Rotterdam. The best two teams then competed in the "Final Four" in Italy, in a best-of-three series, for the championship.

In early 2024, WBSC Europe announced a restructuring of its European club competitions, with the top tier Baseball European Champions Cup now being played in a full-season format at each team's venues, instead of a tournament hosted in one location. The inaugural tournament under the new format featured only 4 teams, two each from Germany and Czech Republic, with expansion planned for the future. Teams from the two countries with the most medals in the tournament, Italy and the Netherlands, no longer competed. The lower-tier competitions kept their tournament structure, with promotion and relegation for its federations.

In 2026, the World Baseball Softball Confederation (WBSC), the parent organization of WBSC Europe, announced a new top-level club tournament, Baseball Champions League Europe, which includes Dutch and Italian teams. The tournament may lead to a global tournament that also includes the Baseball Champions League Americas. As part of the restructuring, the Baseball European Champions Cup will be renamed the Confederation Cup and become the second-tier European club championship.

== Current teams ==
=== 2026 Confederation Cup ===
Team
(Croatia) Olimpija Karlovac
(Belgium) Brasschaat Braves
(Czech Republic) Hroši Brno
(France) Huskies de Rouen
(France) Lions de Savigny

== Results ==
#	Year	Host	Medalists		
#	Year	Host	Winner	Runner-up	Third Place
1	1963	N/A	(Spain); Picadero Barcelona	(Italy); Milan	(West Germany); Mannheim
2	1964	N/A	(Spain); Piratas de Madrid	(Italy); Nettuno	(Netherlands); Sparta-Feyenoord
3	1965	N/A	(Italy); Nettuno	(Netherlands); Sparta-Feyenoord	(Spain); Picadero Barcelona
4	1966	N/A	(Netherlands); Haarlem Nicols	(Italy); Milan	(Italy); Nettuno
5	1967	N/A	(Spain); Piratas de Madrid	(West Germany); Mannheim	(Belgium); Antwerp
6	1968	N/A	(Spain); Picadero Barcelona	(Spain); Piratas de Madrid	(West Germany); Darmstadt
7	1969	N/A	(Italy); Milan	(Spain); Madrid	(Spain); Picadero Barcelona
8	1970	N/A	(Italy); Milan	(Italy); Bologna	(Belgium); Antwerp
9	1971	N/A	(Italy); Milan	(Italy); Bologna	(West Germany); Mannheim
10	1972	N/A	(Italy); Nettuno	(Italy); Milan	(Belgium); Antwerp
11	1973	N/A	(Italy); Bologna	(Netherlands); Sparta-Feyenoord	(Belgium); Antwerp
12	1974	N/A	(Italy); Nettuno	(Netherlands); Haarlem Nicols	(Italy); Bologna
13	1975	N/A	(Netherlands); Haarlem Nicols	(Netherlands); Sparta-Feyenoord	(Spain); Condepols Madrid
14	1976	N/A	(Italy); Rimini	(Belgium); Antwerp	(Spain); Condepols Madrid
15	1977	Italy	(Italy); Parma	(Italy); Rimini	(Netherlands); Haarlem Nicols
16	1978	Italy	(Italy); Parma	(Italy); Rimini	(Spain); Catalunya BC
17	1979	(Italy); Italy (Spain); Barcelona	(Italy); Rimini	(Italy); Parma	(Italy); Bologna
18	1980	(Netherlands); Netherlands Spain	(Italy); Parma	(Netherlands); Amstel Tijgers	(Italy); Rimini
19	1981	(Belgium); Berchem Italy	(Italy); Parma	(Netherlands); Haarlem Nicols	(Italy); Rimini
20	1983	Netherlands	(Italy); Parma	(Netherlands); Haarlem Nicols	(Netherlands); Neptunus
21	1984	Italy	(Italy); Parma	(Italy); Rimini	(Netherlands); Haarlem Nicols
22	1985	Italy	(Italy); Bologna	(Italy); Parma	(Belgium); Antwerp
23	1986	(Belgium); Antwerp	(Italy); Parma	(Italy); Bologna	(Netherlands); Haarlem Nicols
24	1987	(France); Paris	(Italy); Parma	(Italy); Grosseto	(Netherlands); Amsterdam
25	1988	Italy	(Italy); Parma	(Italy); Rimini	(Netherlands); Amsterdam Pirates
26	1989	(Spain); Viladecans	(Italy); Rimini	(Netherlands); Haarlem Nicols	(Italy); Parma
27	1990	(Belgium); Antwerp	(Netherlands); Haarlem Nicols	(Italy); Rimini	(Italy); Grosseto
28	1991	(France); Paris	(Italy); Nettuno	(Netherlands); Haarlem Nicols	(Netherlands); Amsterdam Pirates
29	1992	(Netherlands); Rotterdam	(Italy); Parma	(Netherlands); Neptunus	(Italy); Nettuno
30	1993	Italy	(Netherlands); ADO	(Italy); Parma	(France); Paris
31	1994	Netherlands	(Netherlands); Neptunus	(Netherlands); ADO	(France); Montpellier
32	1995	Netherlands	(Italy); Parma	(Netherlands); Neptunus	(Netherlands); Kinheim
33	1996	San Marino	(Netherlands); Neptunus	(Italy); Parma	(Italy); Nettuno
34	1997	(Belgium); Brasschaat	(Italy); Nettuno	(Netherlands); Neptunus	(Netherlands); HCAW
35	1998	(Spain); Viladecans	(Italy); Parma	(Netherlands); Hoofddorp	(Czech Republic); Brno
36	1999	Italy	(Italy); Parma	(Italy); Nettuno	(Netherlands); HCAW
37	2000	San Marino	(Netherlands); Neptunus	(Italy); Rimini	(Italy); Parma
38	2001	(Netherlands); Rotterdam	(Netherlands); Neptunus	San Marino	(Italy); Rimini
39	2002	(Spain); Viladecans	(Netherlands); Neptunus	(Netherlands); HCAW	(Italy); Nettuno
40	2003	(Italy); Rimini	(Netherlands); Neptunus	(Italy); Rimini	San Marino
41	2004	San Marino	(Netherlands); Neptunus	(Italy); Bologna	(Czech Republic); Brno
42	2005	(Netherlands); Rotterdam	(Italy); Grosseto	(Netherlands); HCAW	(Netherlands); Neptunus
43	2006	(Italy); Grosseto	San Marino	(Italy); Grosseto	(Italy); Bologna
44	2007	San Marino	(Netherlands); Kinheim	(France); Rouen	(Italy); Rimini
45	2008	(Spain); Barcelona	(Italy); Nettuno	San Marino	(Italy); Grosseto
46	2009	(Spain); Barcelona	(Italy); Nettuno	(Italy); Bologna	(Netherlands); Kinheim
47	2010	(Spain); Barcelona	(Italy); Bologna	(Germany); Heidenheim	(Italy); Rimini
48	2011	(Czech Republic); Brno	San Marino	(Italy); Parma	(Italy); Bologna
49	2012	(Italy); Nettuno	(Italy); Bologna	(Italy); Nettuno	(Netherlands); Amsterdam
50	2013	(Italy); Bologna/Rimini	(Italy); Bologna	(Italy); Rimini	Netherlands San Marino
51	2014	(Czech Republic) / (Netherlands); Brno / Hoofddorp	San Marino	(Italy); Rimini	Netherlands Netherlands
52	2015	(Netherlands) / (France); Rotterdam / Paris	(Netherlands); Neptunus	(Italy); Bologna	(Netherlands) Amsterdam Pirates (Czech Republic) Draci Brno
53	2016	(Italy) / Rimini / San Marino	(Netherlands); Amsterdam Pirates	(Italy); Rimini	(Italy); Bologna
54	2017	(Germany); Regensburg	(Netherlands); Neptunus	(Italy); CNF Unipolsai Bologna	T&A San Marino
55	2018	(Netherlands); Rotterdam	(Netherlands); Neptunus	(Italy); Rimini	(Italy); UnipolSai Bologna
56	2019	(Italy); Bologna	(Italy); UnipolSai Bologna	(Netherlands); Amsterdam Pirates	(Netherlands); Neptunus
57	2021	(Czech Republic); Ostrava	(Italy); Parma	(Germany); Bonn Capitals	(Italy); Fortitudo
58	2022	(Germany); Bonn	(Italy); Parma	(Netherlands); Amsterdam Pirates	(Germany); Bonn Capitals
59	2023	(Netherlands); Amsterdam / Bussum	(Netherlands); HCAW	(Italy); Parma	(Netherlands); Amsterdam Pirates
60	2024	(Germany); Regensburg	(Czech Republic); Draci Brno	(Germany); Regensburg	(Germany); Heidenheim
61	2025	(Germany); Bonn	(Germany); Heidenheim	(Germany); Bonn	(Czech Republic) Brno (Czech Republic) Trebíč
Confederation Cup
	2026	(Croatia); Karlovac	(Czech Republic); Hroši Brno	(Belgium); Brasschaat Braves	(France); Rouen Huskies
	2027	(France); Rouen			

== Most championships ==
Team	Number of championships	Years
(Italy) Parma	15	1977, 1978, 1980, 1981, 1983, 1984, 1986, 1987, 1988, 1992, 1995, 1998, 1999, 2021, 2022
(Netherlands) Neptunus	10	1994, 1996, 2000, 2001, 2002, 2003, 2004, 2015, 2017, 2018
(Italy) Nettuno	7	1965, 1972, 1974, 1991, 1997, 2008, 2009
(Italy) Unipolsai Bologna	6	1973, 1985, 2010, 2012, 2013, 2019
(Italy) Milan	3	1969, 1970, 1971
(Italy) Rimini	3	1976, 1979, 1989
(Netherlands) Haarlem Nicols	3	1966, 1975, 1990
T&A San Marino	3	2006, 2011, 2014
(Spain) Piratas de Madrid	2	1964, 1967
(Spain) Picadero Barcelona	2	1963, 1968
(Netherlands) ADO Den Haag	1	1993
(Italy) Grosseto	1	2005
(Netherlands) Kinheim	1	2007
(Netherlands) Amsterdam Pirates	1	2016
(Netherlands) HCAW	1	2023
(Czech Republic) Draci Brno	1	2024
(Germany) Heidenheim	1	2025

== Medals (1963–2025) ==
Rank	Nation	Gold	Silver	Bronze	Total
1	Italy	35	32	20	87
2	Netherlands	17	18	20	55
3	Spain	4	2	5	11
4	San Marino	3	2	3	8
5	Germany	1	5	5	11
6	Czech Republic	1	0	3	4
7	Belgium	0	1	5	6
8	France	0	1	2	3
Totals (8 entries)		61	61	63	185

Note: two bronze medals were awarded in 2013, 2014, and 2015.

== See also ==
- Confederation Cup
- European Baseball Championship
- Asia Series
- Latin American Series
- Caribbean Series
- Baseball awards § Europe
