= Wladimir Pinto =

Venezuelan baseball player (born 1998)

Draci Brno – No. 49
- Pitcher
- Born: February 12, 1998 (age 27); Maracay, Venezuela
- Bats: Right Throws: Right
- Stats at Baseball Reference

Wladimir Ramon Pinto (born February 12, 1998) is a Venezuelan professional baseball pitcher for Draci Brno of the Czech Baseball Extraliga.

== Career ==
=== Detroit Tigers ===
Pinto signed with the Detroit Tigers as an international free agent in 2014. He played for the Venezuelan Summer League Tigers in 2015, going 2–1 with a 3.90 ERA over 27 2/3 innings. In 2016, he played for the Gulf Coast Tigers and went 1–1 with a 2.66 ERA over 23 2/3 innings. He split the 2017 season between the Connecticut Tigers and the West Michigan Whitecaps, going a combined 1–0 with a 0.00 ERA over 10 innings. He split the 2018 season between West Michigan and the Lakeland Flying Tigers, going a combined 4–2 with a 4.50 ERA and 77 strikeouts over 50 innings. He split the 2019 season between Lakeland and the Erie SeaWolves, going a combined 3–4 with a 2.34 ERA and 87 strikeouts over 61 2/3 innings. He played for the Mesa Solar Sox in the Arizona Fall League following the 2019 season.

Pinto did not play in a game in 2020 due to the cancellation of the minor league season because of the COVID-19 pandemic. Pinto spent the majority of the 2021 season with the Triple-A Toledo Mud Hens, pitching to a 3–4 record and 4.62 ERA with 60 strikeouts in 50.2 innings of work. He elected minor league free agency following the season on November 7, 2021.

=== Minnesota Twins ===
On December 16, 2021, Pinto signed a minor league contract with the Minnesota Twins organization. He pitched in 25 games for the Triple-A St. Paul Saints, logging a 3–4 record and 2.08 ERA with 43 strikeouts in 34 2/3 innings pitched. On July 29, 2022, Pinto was released by the Twins organization.

=== Long Island Ducks ===
On August 13, 2022, Pinto signed with the Long Island Ducks of the Atlantic League of Professional Baseball. Pinto made 13 appearances for Long Island down the stretch, recording a 1.17 ERA with 14 strikeouts in 15 1/3 innings pitched. He became a free agent after the season.

On April 18, 2023, Pinto re-signed with the Ducks for the 2023 season. In 8 games (3 starts) for the Ducks, Pinto registered a 4.11 ERA with 16 strikeouts in 15 1/3 innings of work. He was released by Long Island on June 20.

On June 2, 2024, Pinto once more re–signed with the Ducks. In 13 appearances for Long Island, he struggled to a 6.92 ERA with 13 strikeouts over 13 innings of work. Pinto became a free agent following the season.

=== Draci Brno ===
On January 17, 2025, it was announced that Pinto had signed with Draci Brno of the Czech Baseball Extraliga.
