= Franklin van Gurp =

Sint Maartener baseball player (born 1995)

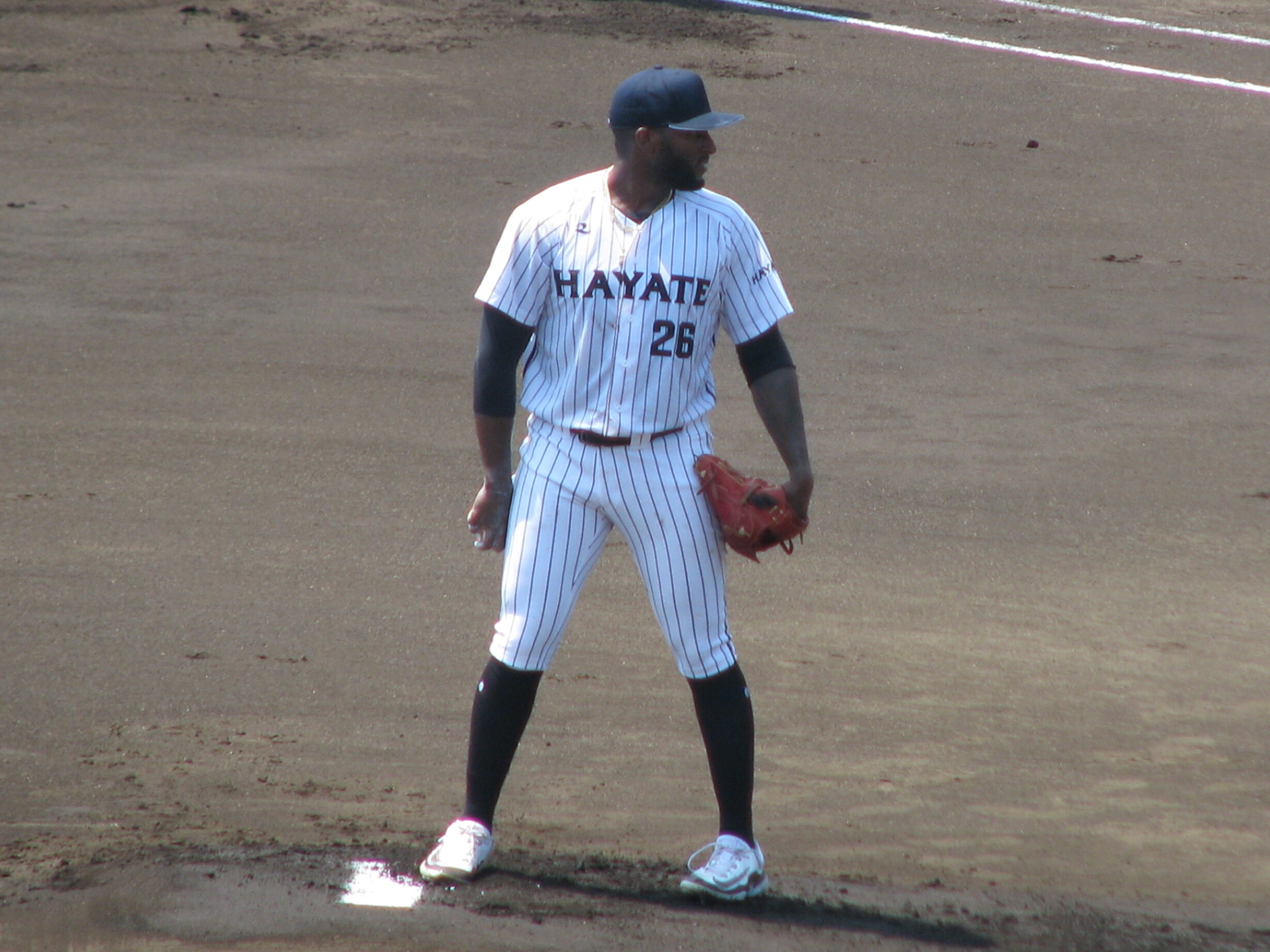
- van Gurp in 2024

Royal Scorpions
- Relief pitcher
- Born: 25 October 1995 (age 31); Philipsburg, Sint Maarten
- Bats: Right Throws: Right
- Stats at Baseball Reference
Medals
Men's baseball
Representing Netherlands
European Baseball Championship
Bronze medal – third place	2023 Czech Republic	Team

Franklin van Gurp (born 25 October 1995) is a Sint Maartener professional baseball pitcher for the Royal Scorpions of the Curaçao National Championship AA League. After spending four seasons playing in the minor leagues, van Gurp has pitched in independent leagues, winter leagues and the Honkbal Hoofdklasse. He has represented the Netherlands at the 2019 WBSC Premier12, the 2023 World Baseball Classic, the 2023 European Baseball Championship and the 2024 WBSC Premier12.

== Early life ==
Van Gurp was born on 25 October 1995 in Philipsburg, Sint Maarten. He began playing baseball in Sint Maarten, first in Pony League and later in Little League, initially as a catcher before transitioning to pitching. At the age of nine, he moved with his mother, who is Dominican, to the Dominican Republic, where she believed he would have better opportunities for development as a baseball player than in his homeland.

After graduating from high school, he moved to the United States and enrolled Chipola College, a junior college in Marianna, Florida, where he played baseball for the Chipola Indians as both a pitcher and a catcher. In 2017, he transferred to the Florida International University, playing for the Panthers appearing in 19 games that season and recording a 0–1 record with two saves, a 2.91 ERA, and 32 strikeouts.

== Professional career ==
=== San Francisco Giants ===
In the 2017 Major League Baseball draft, van Gurp by the San Francisco Giants in the 25th round (756th overall). He made his professional debut with the rookie–level Arizona League Giants, where he appeared in 17 games and posted a 5–1 record and 0.92 ERA with 41 strikeouts and two saves.

Van Gurp split the 2018 season between the Single–A Augusta GreenJackets, High–A San Jose Giants, and Double–A Richmond Flying Squirrels. In 33 appearances for the three affiliates, he posted a cumulative 5–0 record and 3.97 ERA with 84 strikeouts and four saves across 65 2/3 innings pitched. In 2019, he began the year in High–A, appearing intermittently between Augusta and Double–A Richmond.

=== San Diego Padres ===
On 10 June 2019, van Gurp was traded to the San Diego Padres in exchange for Alex Dickerson. He spent the remainder of the season with the Single–A Fort Wayne TinCaps and High–A Lake Elsinore Storm.

Van Gurp did not play in a game in 2020 due to the cancellation of the minor league season because of the COVID-19 pandemic. He was released by the Padres organization on 26 March 2021.

=== Seattle Mariners ===
On 30 June 2021, van Gurp signed a minor league contract with the Seattle Mariners. He made 16 appearances split between the High–A Everett AquaSox and rookie–level Arizona Complex League Mariners, posting a combined 1–3 record and 5.70 ERA with 41 strikeouts and one save across 30 innings pitched. Van Gurp elected free agency following the season on 7 November.

=== Amsterdam Pirates ===
In 2022, van Gurp joined the Amsterdam Pirates of the Dutch Honkbal Hoofdklasse, where he had a 3-0 record with a 1.42 ERA and 17 strikeouts in nine games. He also pitched in three games at the 2022 European Champions Cup, leading the tournament in losses with two.

=== Gastonia Honey Hunters ===
On 5 August 2022, van Gurp signed with the Gastonia Honey Hunters of the Atlantic League of Professional Baseball. He appeared in three games and recorded a 2.25 ERA with six strikeouts over four innings of work. Van Gurp was released by the Honey Hunters on 26 August.

=== York Revolution ===
On 26 August 2022, van Gurp was signed by the York Revolution of the Atlantic League of Professional Baseball. He appeared in 11 games for York, recording an 0.79 ERA with 16 strikeouts over 11 1/3 innings of work.

=== Long Island Ducks ===
On 17 July 2023, van Gurp joined the Long Island Ducks of the Atlantic League of Professional Baseball. He pitched in 25 games for the Ducks, compiling an ERA of 1.85 with 36 strikeouts over 24 1/3 innings pitched.

=== Kufu HAYATE Ventures Shizuoka ===
On 2 July 2024, van Gurp signed with the Kufu HAYATE Ventures Shizuoka of the Western League, one of the two minor leagues in Japan. He made his debut and first start with the team on 9 July against the Hanshin Tigers, pitching two innings, allowing four walks and no hits. Van Gurp appeared in 10 games for the club, mostly as a starter, finishing with an 0-6 record and 33 strikeouts with an ERA of 5.87. He was released by the team on 2 October.

=== Charleston Dirty Birds ===
On 10 July 2025, van Gurp signed with the Charleston Dirty Birds of the Atlantic League of Professional Baseball. He appeared in 18 games for Charleston, logging a 1-0 record with a 3.93 ERA and 23 strikeouts across 18 1/3 innings pitched. On 11 September, van Gurp was released by the Dirty Birds.

== International career ==
Van Gurp made his first major international appearance for the Netherlands at the 2019 WBSC Premier12, appearing twice as a reliever against the Dominican Republic and Mexico, totaling 1 2/3 innings pitched while allowing one run for a 5.40 ERA. The Dutch team was eliminated in the opening round, played in the Estadio Panamericano de Béisbol in Zapopan, Mexico.

Van Gurp was selected to play at the 2023 World Baseball Classic, appearing in three games against Cuba, Panama and Italy, and pitching 2 2/3 innings while allowing one hit and no runs.

In September 2023, van Gurp represented the Netherlands at the 2023 European Baseball Championship, winning the bronze medal. He appeared in three games as a reliever: in the Netherlands’ 16–3 first-round win against Ukraine, in which he pitched one scoreless inning; in the 7–6 semifinal loss to Spain, in which he pitched two innings and allowed two runs; and in the bronze medal game, a 5–4 win over Germany, in which he pitched 2/3 of a scoreless inning. Van Gurp finished the tournament with an ERA of 4.91.

In October 2024, van Gurp was selected as part of the Dutch squad that competed at the 2024 WBSC Premier12, played in November, where the team was eliminated in the opening round. He made two relief appearances, against Panama and Puerto Rico, and finished the tournament with 1 1/3 innings pitched and two earned runs, resulting in a 13.50 ERA.
