= Ondřej Satoria =

Czech baseball player (born 1997)

Arrows Ostrava – No. 21
- Pitcher
- Born: 26 February 1997 (age 29); Ostrava, Czech Republic
- Bats: Right Throws: Right
- Stats at Baseball Reference
Medals
Men's baseball
Representing Czech Republic
European Championship
| Bronze medal – third place | 2025 Rotterdam | Team |

Ondřej Satoria (born 26 February 1997) is a Czech electrical engineer and professional baseball pitcher for Arrows Ostrava of the Czech Baseball Extraliga. He represented the Czech Republic national team in international competition.

== Professional career ==
Satoria played with Arrows Ostrava in the 2022 and 2023 seasons. At the 2023 European Champions Cup, he pitched nine scoreless innings over two games.

Satoria was recognized as the 2023 Sportsman of the Year by the city of Ostrava.

== International career ==
Satoria was selected to the Czech Republic national team for four different U-23 Baseball World Cups, in 2014, 2016, 2018 and 2021. His best performance was in 2021, when he went 11 2/3 innings pitched with a 1–1 record and a 2.40 ERA. He was again on the Czech roster for the 2023 World Baseball Classic qualifiers, working a scoreless 2/3 innings.

At the 2023 World Baseball Classic, Satoria made a single appearance in a start against heavily favored Japan; he allowed three runs over three innings of work, taking the loss in the 10–2 defeat. Nevertheless, he made international headlines when he struck out three Japan players: Lars Nootbaar, Kensuke Kondoh, and Shohei Ohtani. The strikeout of Ohtani, widely regarded as one of the best players in the world, by Satoria, a full-time electrical engineer., was described by The Japan Times as "one shining moment" where "David toppled Goliath."

Satoria was also part of the Czech roster for the 2023 European Baseball Championship.

Satoria returned to the Czech National Team for the 2026 World Baseball Classic, where he pitched 8 1/3 innings with a 0.00 ERA. In his final career game for the Czech National Team, Satoria threw 4 2/3 scoreless innings, striking out three and allowing only six hits. He received a standing ovation from both the fans and Japan players. After the tournament, he announced his retirement from international competition.

== Occupation ==
"I'm not an electrician. "The Electrician"—they gave me that nickname because I think it's easier to call me an electrician than what I actually do. My position is called small construction project manager. I don't connect wires, but I look at them. When someone has a property they want to connect to the grid, they submit a request that then lands on our desk."

— Sartoria on what he actually does.

Despite popular international reporting, Satoria is not an electrician but actually an electrical engineer. He works for ČEZ, one of the largest utility companies in Central and Eastern Europe, practicing after work and playing on weekends.
