= Piratas de Madrid =

Baseball team based in Spain

The Piratas de Madrid (Madrid Pirates) (a.k.a. Piratas Beisbol Club) are a baseball team based in Madrid, Spain. The team has competed in the European Cup, winning it twice.

The team was considered one of the best Spaniard baseball teams in the late 1960s, winning back to back national titles in 1966 and 1967, as well as in 1981. It also won the European Cup title in 1964 and 1967.

== See also ==
- Picadero JC- another Spanish baseball team and European Cup winner
