= Pavel Budský =

Czech baseball player (born 1973)

- Pitcher / First baseman
- Born: October 30, 1973 (age 52); Prague, Czechoslovakia
- Bats: right Throws: right
- Stats at Baseball Reference

Pavel Budský (born 30 October 1973) is a Czech baseball first basemen. He played for the Draci Brno of Czech Baseball Extraliga.

Budský briefly played in Minor League Baseball. He signed with the Montreal Expos in October 1996 but was released in May 1997. He signed with the Kansas City Royals that July and was a pitcher for six games for 1997 Gulf Coast League Royals. He had previously played in the Extraliga and left a job as a computer technician to play in the United States.

Budský was selected for the Czech Republic national baseball team at the European Baseball Championship in 1997, 2001, 2003, 2005, 2007, 2010, and 2012, as well as the 2012 Italian Baseball Week, 2009 Baseball World Cup, 2010 Intercontinental Cup, and 2013 World Baseball Classic qualification.
