= 2016 CEB Cup =

Tournament details
- Country: France
- Dates: June 1 – June 5
- Teams: 8

The 2016 CEB Cup, the inaugural tournament of a new, annual European baseball competition, was held from June 1, to June 5, 2016. It was hosted in Rouen, France, and Chartres, France.

== List of competing teams ==
Federation	Qualified Team(s)
(France) FFBSC	Les Barracudas Montpellier Rouen Huskies
(Croatia) HBS	Nada SSM Split Olimpija Karlovac
(Ukraine) FBSU	KNTU Elizavetgrad
(Belarus) BBA	Minsk Baseball
(Austria) ABF	Vienna Wanderers
(Switzerland) SBSF	Zurich Barracudas

== First round ==
Advances to semi-finals
Advances to Pool C

=== Pool A ===
Rk	Team	W	L	Pct.	RF	RA
1	(France) LB Montpellier	2	1	.667		
2	(Croatia) Olimpija Karlovac	2	1	.667		
3	(Belarus) Minsk Baseball	1	2	.333		
4	(Austria) Vienna Wanderers	1	2	.333		

Date	Local time	Road team	Score	Home team	Inn.	Venue	Game duration	Attendance	Boxscore
Jun 1, 2016	13:30	Minsk Baseball (Belarus)	3-6	(Croatia) Olimpija Karlovac		Terrain Pierre Rolland			
Jun 1, 2016	14:00	Vienna Wanderers (Austria)	2-0	(France) LB Montpellier		Stade Chartres			
Jun 2, 2016	10:00	Olimpija Karlovac (Croatia)	15-9	(Austria) Vienna Wanderers		Terrain Pierre Rolland			
Jun 2, 2016	13:30	LB Montpellier (France)	14-2	(Belarus) Minsk Baseball		Terrain Pierre Rolland			
Jun 3, 2016	10:00	Vienna Wanderers (Austria)	2-6	(Belarus) Minsk Baseball		Terrain Pierre Rolland			
Jun 3, 2016	14:00	Olimpija Karlovac (Croatia)	7-8	(France) LB Montpellier		Stade Chartres			

=== Pool B ===
Rk	Team	W	L	Pct.	RF	RA
1	(France) Rouen Huskies	3	0	1.000		
2	(Croatia) Nada SSM Split	2	1	.667		
3	(Switzerland) Zurich Barracudas	1	2	.333		
4	(Ukraine) KNTU Elizavetgrad	0	3	.000		

Date	Local time	Road team	Score	Home team	Inn.	Venue	Game duration	Attendance	Boxscore
Jun 1, 2016	10:00	Zurich Barracudas (Switzerland)	6-3	(Ukraine) KNTU Elizavetgrad		Terrain Pierre Rolland			
Jun 1, 2016	17:00	Rouen Huskies (France)	17-0	(Croatia) Nada SSM Split	5	Terrain Pierre Rolland			
Jun 2, 2016	14:00	Nada SSM Split (Croatia)	12-1	(Switzerland) Zurich Barracudas	7	Stade Chartres			
Jun 2, 2016	17:00	KNTU Elizavetgrad (Ukraine)	1-11	(France) Rouen Huskies	7	Terrain Pierre Rolland			
Jun 3, 2016	13:30	Nada SSM Split (Croatia)	8-5	(Ukraine) KNTU Elizavetgrad		Terrain Pierre Rolland			
Jun 3, 2016	17:00	Zurich Barracudas (Switzerland)	1-11	(France) Rouen Huskies	7	Terrain Pierre Rolland			

== Second round ==
Pool C

Date	Local time	Road team	Score	Home team	Inn.	Venue	Game duration	Attendance	Boxscore
Jun 4, 2016	10:00	KNTU Elizavetgrad (Ukraine)	15-2	(Belarus) Minsk Baseball	8	Terrain Pierre Rolland			
Jun 4, 2016	14:00	Vienna Wanderers (Austria)	9-13	(Switzerland) Zurich Barracudas		Stade Chartres			

Semi-finals

Date	Local time	Road team	Score	Home team	Inn.	Venue	Game duration	Attendance	Boxscore
Jun 4, 2016	13:30	LB Montpellier (France)	7-1	(Croatia) Nada SSM Split		Terrain Pierre Rolland			
Jun 4, 2016	17:00	Rouen Huskies (France)	4-0	(Croatia) Olimpija Karlovac		Terrain Pierre Rolland			

== Third round ==
7th/8th Playoff

Date	Local time	Road team	Score	Home team	Inn.	Venue	Game duration	Attendance	Boxscore
Jun 5, 2016	10:00	Vienna Wanderers (Austria)	2-7	(Belarus) Minsk Baseball		Terrain Pierre Rolland			

Vienna Wanderers were relegated to the Federations Cup.

There will be no 5th/6th playoff so both teams will finish in joint 5th place.

3rd/4th Playoff

Date	Local time	Road team	Score	Home team	Inn.	Venue	Game duration	Attendance	Boxscore
Jun 5, 2016	14:00	Nada SSM Split (Croatia)	3-5	(Croatia) Olimpija Karlovac		Stade Chartres			

Final

Date	Local time	Road team	Score	Home team	Inn.	Venue	Game duration	Attendance	Boxscore
Jun 5, 2016	15:00	Rouen Huskies (France)	5-2	(France) LB Montpellier		Terrain Pierre Rolland			

Rouen Huskies were promoted to the CEB Champions Cup.

== See also ==
- European Baseball Championship
- Asia Series
- Caribbean Series
- Baseball awards#Europe
