= 2011 World Port Tournament =

Tournament details
- Country: Netherlands
- Dates: 23 June–3 July
- Teams: 5
- Defending champions: Cuba

Final positions
- Champions: Chinese Taipei (1st title)
- Runners-up: Cuba
- Third place: Netherlands
- Fourth place: Curaçao

Awards
- MVP: (Chinese Taipei) Han Lin

The 2011 World Port Tournament was an international baseball competition held at the Neptunus Family Stadium in Rotterdam, the Netherlands from June 23 to July 3, 2011. It was the 13th edition of the tournament.

During the tournament, Cuban pitcher Gerardo Concepción defected from Cuba and outfield Yasiel Puig attempted to defect and was banned from playing for the national team.

In the end, Chinese Taipei won its first title, after beating Cuba in an 11-inning game.

== Teams ==
The following 5 teams confirmed their appearance.

Chinese Taipei	9th appearance
Cuba	6th appearance
Curaçao	3rd appearance
Germany	1st appearance
Netherlands	Host nation

== Schedule and results ==
=== Standings ===
Teams	W	L	Pct.	GB	R	RA
Chinese Taipei	7	1	.875	—	51	17
Cuba	5	3	.625	2	18	17
Netherlands	5	3	.625	2	32	18
Curaçao	2	6	.250	5	15	59
Germany	1	7	.125	6	23	28

=== Schedule ===
June 23, 2011	Germany	3 – 5	Chinese Taipei	Neptunus Family Stadium, Rotterdam
June 23, 2011		Boxscore		Neptunus Family Stadium, Rotterdam

June 23, 2011	Netherlands	6 – 0	Curaçao	Neptunus Family Stadium, Rotterdam
June 23, 2011		Boxscore		Neptunus Family Stadium, Rotterdam

June 24, 2011	Curaçao	6 – 4	Cuba	Neptunus Family Stadium, Rotterdam
June 24, 2011		Boxscore		Neptunus Family Stadium, Rotterdam

June 24, 2011	Chinese Taipei	8 – 4	Netherlands	Neptunus Family Stadium, Rotterdam
June 24, 2011		Boxscore		Neptunus Family Stadium, Rotterdam

June 25, 2011	Netherlands	2 – 1	Germany	Neptunus Family Stadium, Rotterdam
June 25, 2011		Boxscore		Neptunus Family Stadium, Rotterdam

June 26, 2011	Netherlands	1 – 4	Cuba	Neptunus Family Stadium, Rotterdam
June 26, 2011		Boxscore		Neptunus Family Stadium, Rotterdam

June 26, 2011	Germany	1 – 5	Curaçao	Neptunus Family Stadium, Rotterdam
June 26, 2011		Boxscore		Neptunus Family Stadium, Rotterdam

June 27, 2011	Cuba	1 – 3	Chinese Taipei	Neptunus Family Stadium, Rotterdam
June 27, 2011		Boxscore		Neptunus Family Stadium, Rotterdam

June 27, 2011	Cuba	4 – 3 (F/10)	Germany	Neptunus Family Stadium, Rotterdam
June 27, 2011		Boxscore		Neptunus Family Stadium, Rotterdam

June 27, 2011	Curaçao	1 – 7	Chinese Taipei	Neptunus Family Stadium, Rotterdam
June 27, 2011		Boxscore		Neptunus Family Stadium, Rotterdam

June 28, 2011	Chinese Taipei	19 – 1 (F/7)	Curaçao	Neptunus Family Stadium, Rotterdam
June 28, 2011		Boxscore		Neptunus Family Stadium, Rotterdam

June 28, 2011	Germany	1 – 6 (F/5½)	Netherlands	Neptunus Family Stadium, Rotterdam
June 28, 2011		Boxscore		Neptunus Family Stadium, Rotterdam

June 29, 2011	Cuba	1 – 0	Curaçao	Neptunus Family Stadium, Rotterdam
June 29, 2011		Boxscore		Neptunus Family Stadium, Rotterdam

June 29, 2011	Netherlands	4 – 2	Chinese Taipei	Neptunus Family Stadium, Rotterdam
June 29, 2011		Boxscore		Neptunus Family Stadium, Rotterdam

June 30, 2011	Curaçao	2 – 12 (F/8)	Germany	Neptunus Family Stadium, Rotterdam
June 30, 2011		Boxscore		Neptunus Family Stadium, Rotterdam

June 30, 2011	Chinese Taipei	4 – 1	Cuba	Neptunus Family Stadium, Rotterdam
June 30, 2011		Boxscore		Neptunus Family Stadium, Rotterdam

July 1, 2011	Chinese Taipei	3 – 2	Germany	Neptunus Family Stadium, Rotterdam
July 1, 2011		Boxscore		Neptunus Family Stadium, Rotterdam

July 1, 2011	Cuba	2 – 0	Netherlands	Neptunus Family Stadium, Rotterdam
July 1, 2011		Boxscore		Neptunus Family Stadium, Rotterdam

July 2, 2011	Curaçao	0 – 9	Netherlands	Neptunus Family Stadium, Rotterdam
July 2, 2011		Boxscore		Neptunus Family Stadium, Rotterdam

July 2, 2011	Germany	0 – 1	Cuba	Neptunus Family Stadium, Rotterdam
July 2, 2011		Boxscore		Neptunus Family Stadium, Rotterdam

July 3, 2011	Chinese Taipei	5 – 4 (F/11)	Cuba	Neptunus Family Stadium, Rotterdam
July 3, 2011		Boxscore		Neptunus Family Stadium, Rotterdam
