= Gianni Falchi Stadium =

Baseball stadium located in Bologna, Italy

Coordinates: 44.46243°N 11.38078°E

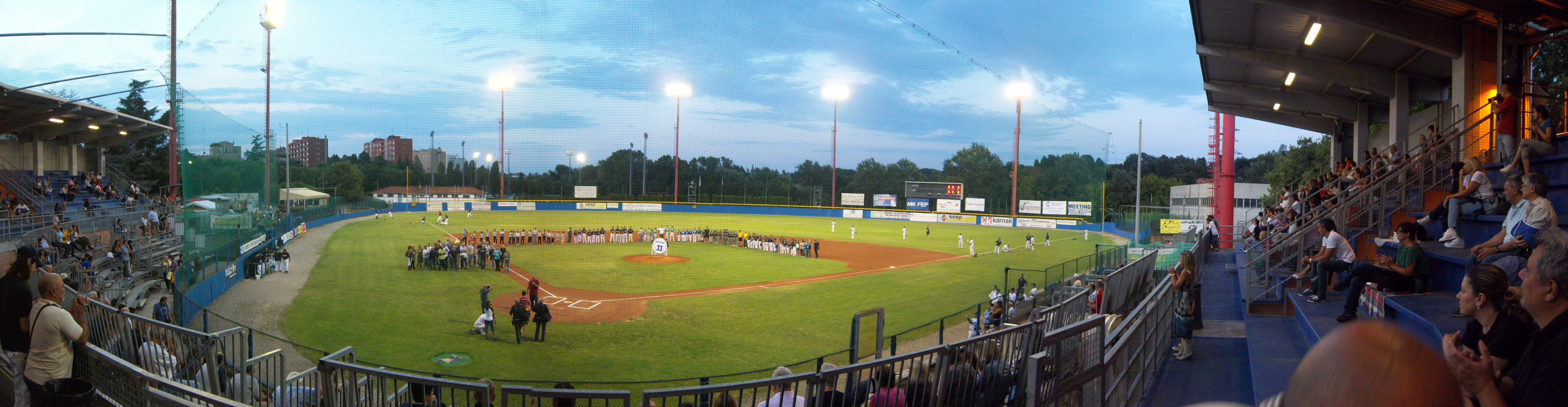
Gianni Falchi Stadium (2011)

Gianni Falchi Stadium is a baseball stadium located in Bologna, Italy. It is the home ballpark of Fortitudo Baseball Bologna in the Italian Baseball League.

== History ==
The baseball stadium was opened in 1969, becoming the new home of Fortitudo Bologna. The stadium was named after Gianni Falchi, an Italian baseball journalist.

The stadium on four occasions (1978, 1988, 1998, and 2009) hosted the games of the Baseball World Cup, and the European Baseball Championship and two editions of the Intercontinental Cup (1973 and 1993) were also played at the stadium.

From September 18–22, 2019, it hosted games of the WBSC Baseball Europe/Africa Olympic qualifier.
