= SV Rap =

Dutch football club

- Full name: Sportvereeniging Rap
- Founded: 1917
- Ground: Sportpark Het Loopveld, Amstelveen, Netherlands
- Chairman: Paul Hopman
- Manager: Albert Evers
- League: Reserve Vijfde Klasse
- Website: http://www.svrap.nl

Sportvereeniging Rap is a Dutch football (soccer) club based in Amstelveen, Netherlands. It competes in the Vijfde Klasse, the eight tier of football in the Netherlands, and the sixth tier of Dutch amateur football.

The club was founded in 1917. It plays home matches at Sportpark 't Loopveld in Amstelveen.

== Managers ==
- Albert Evers
