= Neptunus =

Baseball team in Rotterdam

Logo	Cap insignia

Information
- League: Honkbal Hoofdklasse
- Location: Rotterdam
- Ballpark: Neptunus Familiestadion (2,460 capacity)
- Founded: 1943
- European Cup championships: 10 1994, 1996, 2000, 2001, 2002, 2003, 2004, 2015, 2017, 2018
- League championships: 21 1981, 1991, 1993, 1995, 1999, 2000, 2001, 2002, 2003, 2004, 2005, 2009, 2010, 2013, 2014, 2015, 2016, 2017, 2018, 2024, 2025
- 2025: 44–7 (first place)
- Colors: Dark blue and white
- President: Mark Herbold
- Manager: Greg Muller
- Website: https://www.neptunussport.com/

Current uniforms
Home	Away

Neptunus is a professional baseball and softball club in Rotterdam, the Netherlands.

Neptunus is the most successful team in the Honkbal Hoofdklasse, the top level of professional baseball in the Netherlands. It has won the Holland Series 21 times. That includes seven consecutive titles from 1999 to 2005. During that dominant stretch, Neptunus also won the continental European Cup five consecutive times from 2000 to 2004. In 2010, the team set a single-season Dutch league record by winning 39 games.

The club evolved out of the multi-sports club SC Neptunus, which was founded on 1 June 1900. The baseball department was founded on 3 May 1943 and the softball department on 17 June 1973. Although the club fielded a football team in the past, Neptunus is primarily known for baseball and softball.

Following its 2014 championship season, the club signed a sponsorship contract for the 2015 through 2017 seasons with Curaçao and competes under the name Curaçao Neptunus. The club has revenues of 1 million euros.

== Honours ==
=== National ===
- Hoofdklasse: 22 (most in the league)

1981, 1991, 1993, 1995, 1999, 2000, 2001, 2002, 2003, 2004, 2005, 2009, 2010, 2013, 2014, 2015, 2016, 2017, 2018, 2024, 2025, 2026

- KNBSB Cup: 15

1992, 1995, 1997, 1999, 2000, 2001, 2002, 2003, 2005, 2009, 2010, 2011, 2013, 2014, 2017

=== International ===
- European Cup: 10

1994, 1996, 2000, 2001, 2002, 2003, 2004, 2015, 2017, 2018

- European Super Cup: 7

1995, 1997, 1999, 2000, 2001, 2002, 2003

== European Champions Cup record ==
Year	Venue	Finish	Wins	Losses	Win%	Manager
2018	(Netherlands) Rotterdam	1st	5	0	1.000	(Netherlands) Ronald Jaarsma
2019	(Italy) Bologna	3rd	4	1	.800	(Netherlands) Ronald Jaarsma
2021	(Czech Republic) Ostrava	4th	2	3	.400	(Netherlands) Ronald Jaarsma
2022	(Germany) Bonn	7th	3	2	.600	(Netherlands) Raily Legito
Total			14	6	.700	
