= Huskies de Rouen =

French professional baseball team

The Rouen Baseball 76 is a French professional baseball team. Founded in March 1986 by Pierre Yves Rolland, Xavier Rolland, Marcel Brihiez and Charles Michel Do Marcolino, the team competes in the top league in France. The Huskies home stadium is Terrain Pierre Rolland, located in Rouen. Rouen has won 19 French championships, most recently in 2025, thus trailing only Paris as the French team with the most titles. Rouen was ranked as the number 6 team in Europe as of February 2020.

== Titles ==
- French national champions: 2003, 2005, 2006, 2007, 2008, 2009, 2010, 2011, 2012, 2013, 2015, 2016, 2017, 2018, 2019, 2021, 2022, 2024, 2025
- Challenge of France champions: 2002, 2007, 2009, 2011, 2012, 2013, 2015, 2016, 2018
- CEB Cup champions: 2016, 2022
- European Final 4: 2012
