= Draci Brno =

Baseball team from Brno, Czech Republic

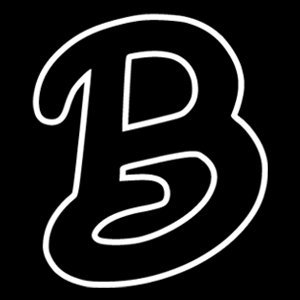
Logo	Cap insignia

Information
- League: Czech Extraliga
- Location: Brno, Czech Republic
- Ballpark: Městský stadium
- Established: 1972; 53 years ago
- League championships: 26 (1995, 1996, 1997, 1998, 1999, 2000, 2001, 2002, 2003, 2004, 2005, 2006, 2007, 2008, 2009, 2010, 2012, 2013, 2014, 2016, 2017, 2020, 2022, 2023, 2024, 2025)
- Colors: Black, white and gold

Draci Brno (English: Brno Dragons) is a baseball team from Brno, Czech Republic. The team plays in the Czech Extraliga.

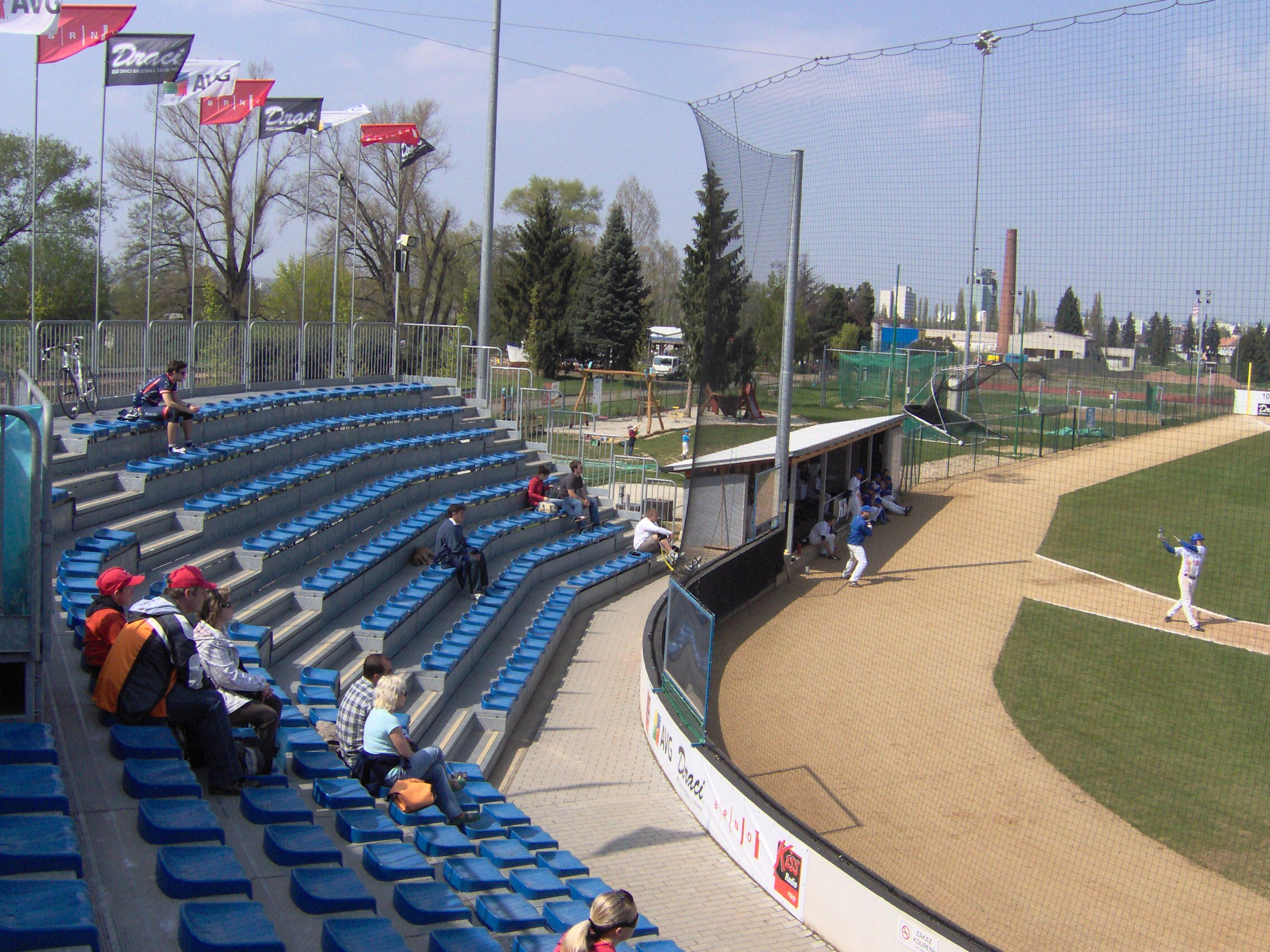
Městský stadium

== History ==
Draci Brno was founded as Slavia Brno VŠZ in 1972. In 1973, the team won the Czechoslovak amateur softball tournament and the next year they were invited to join the newly created national league organized by the Czechoslovak Association of Physical Education. Since then, the club has played every season on the top tier of Czechoslovak/Czech baseball, except for the 1993 season, when they were forced to play in a lower level league. That same year, the team changed its name to VSK VŠZ Draci Brno.

Draci Brno won their first Extraliga title in 1995 and won every season back to back from 1995 to 2010. The club has the most titles with a total of 26.

In 2016, the team participated in and won the inaugural and only season of the Euro League Baseball.

== Roster ==
Draci Brno roster – Extraliga 2021
Players		Coaches
Pitchers: 11 Radim Chroust; 23 Marcus Jensen; 14 Filip Čapka; 42 Jan Vašourek; 16 Jan Nebenführ; 43 David Mergans; 16 Tomáš Hrbek; 12 Ondřej Furko	Catchers: 18 Michael Varga; 30 Šimon Drápela; 25 Jakub Winkler; Infielders: 24 Pavel Budský; 27 Přemek Chroust; 2 Jakub Hajtmar; 10 Martin Červinka; 28 Zdeněk Chvátal; 13 Martin Schneider; 56 Milan Prokop; Outfielders: 9 Arnošt Dubový; 1 Adam Hajtmar; 31 Filip Moštěk; 8 Martin Kalábek	Manager: 19 Arnošt Nesňal; Coaches: 22 Hynek Čapka (head); 50 David Winkler (third base); 13 Pavel Chadim (assistant); 26 Karel Hrušovský (assistant)

== Euro League Baseball ==
Draci Brno is one of the four teams to start in the inaugural season of the Euro League Baseball.

2016 Euro League Baseball standings
Pos	Team	Pld	HW	HL	AW	AL	GB	PCT
1	Draci Brno	8	2	2	4	0	—	.750
2	Regensburg Legionäre	8	2	2	1	3	3	.375
3	Munich-Haar Disciples	8	2	2	1	3	3	.375

== Achievements ==
- Extraliga : 25 (1995, 1996, 1997, 1998, 1999, 2000, 2001, 2002, 2003, 2004, 2005, 2006, 2007, 2008, 2009, 2010, 2012, 2013, 2014, 2016, 2017, 2020, 2022, 2023, 2024, 2025)
- European Champions Cup winner 1 (2024)
- CEB Cup winner : 1 (2017)
- 3rd European Cup : 2 (1998, 2004)
