= Amsterdam Pirates =

Dutch baseball and softball organization

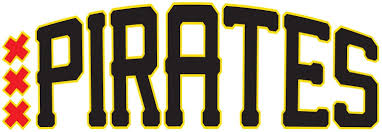
- Logo

Information
- League: Honkbal Hoofdklasse
- Location: Osdorp, Amsterdam
- Ballpark: Loek Loevendie Ballpark (2,000 capacity)
- Founded: 1959
- Holland Series championships: 7 (1987, 1990, 2008, 2011, 2019, 2021, 2023)
- Colors: Black, gold, white
- Manager: Mervin Gario
- Website: AmsterdamPirates.nl

Current uniforms
Home	Away

SV Amsterdam Pirates, commonly referred to as Amsterdam Pirates, is a Dutch baseball and softball organization based in Amsterdam that plays in the Honkbal Hoofdklasse. It was founded as an expansion of the football club SV Rap on 17 February 1959 by Loek Loevendie. In the first years, it was known as the RAP Pirates, but after a few years the club changed its name according to American tradition (first city name, then franchise name) and became the Amsterdam Pirates.

The club celebrated a Dutch Championship in 1987 and 1990. The next few years, it was at the lower end of the Hoofdklasse, which was dominated by Neptunus from Rotterdam. The club returned to prominence in the 21st century, winning five national titles between 2008 and 2023.

In earlier years, there were competing baseball teams in Amsterdam, including the Amstel Tijgers and Ajax, both of which earned multiple national titles.

Amsterdam Pirates is the second-largest baseball club of the Netherlands (after Almere).

For sponsorship reasons, the baseball team played under the name L&D Amsterdam.

== History ==
Amsterdam Pirates was founded in 1959 by Loek Loevendie and Jaap van der Zee as the baseball department of SV Rap. In 1973, the baseball and softball teams decided to separate from SV Rap and continued as an independent association named SV Amsterdam Pirates starting from 1974.

In 1981, the baseball team was promoted to the Honkbal Hoofdklasse, and a few years later the softball team was also promoted to the Softbal Hoofdklasse. In 1987, the Amsterdam Pirates become national champion for the first time. This was followed by a second title in 1990. In 2000, the Pirates moved to their current stadium in Sportpark Ookmeer in the Osdorp neighborhood.

In 2007, the club reached the playoffs of the Hoofdklasse for the first time in 15 years. It almost reached the Holland Series, coming back in a best-of-five series, after being 2–0 down, in the end they lost.

2008 saw a third championship and second Holland Series championship. They reached the playoffs by being third in the regular season, then beating Neptunus in the first round and defending champions Kinheim in the 2008 Holland Series. The Holland Series was a clean sweep, with the final game ending 12–0.

In 2011 they were champions again, beating Hoofddorp Pioniers. In 2019, Amsterdam Pirates won its fifth championship, beating Neptunus in seven games in the Holland Series after trailing 3 games ro none.

In 2016, Amsterdam Pirates won the European Champions Cup defeating A.S.D. Rimini in the championship game 5–4 in extra innings.

After the departure of many veteran players, head coach Ronald Jaarsma, and main sponsor L&D, Amsterdam Pirates won its sixth championship in 2023, defeating perennial contender Neptunus 4–3 in the Holland Series.

== Ballpark ==
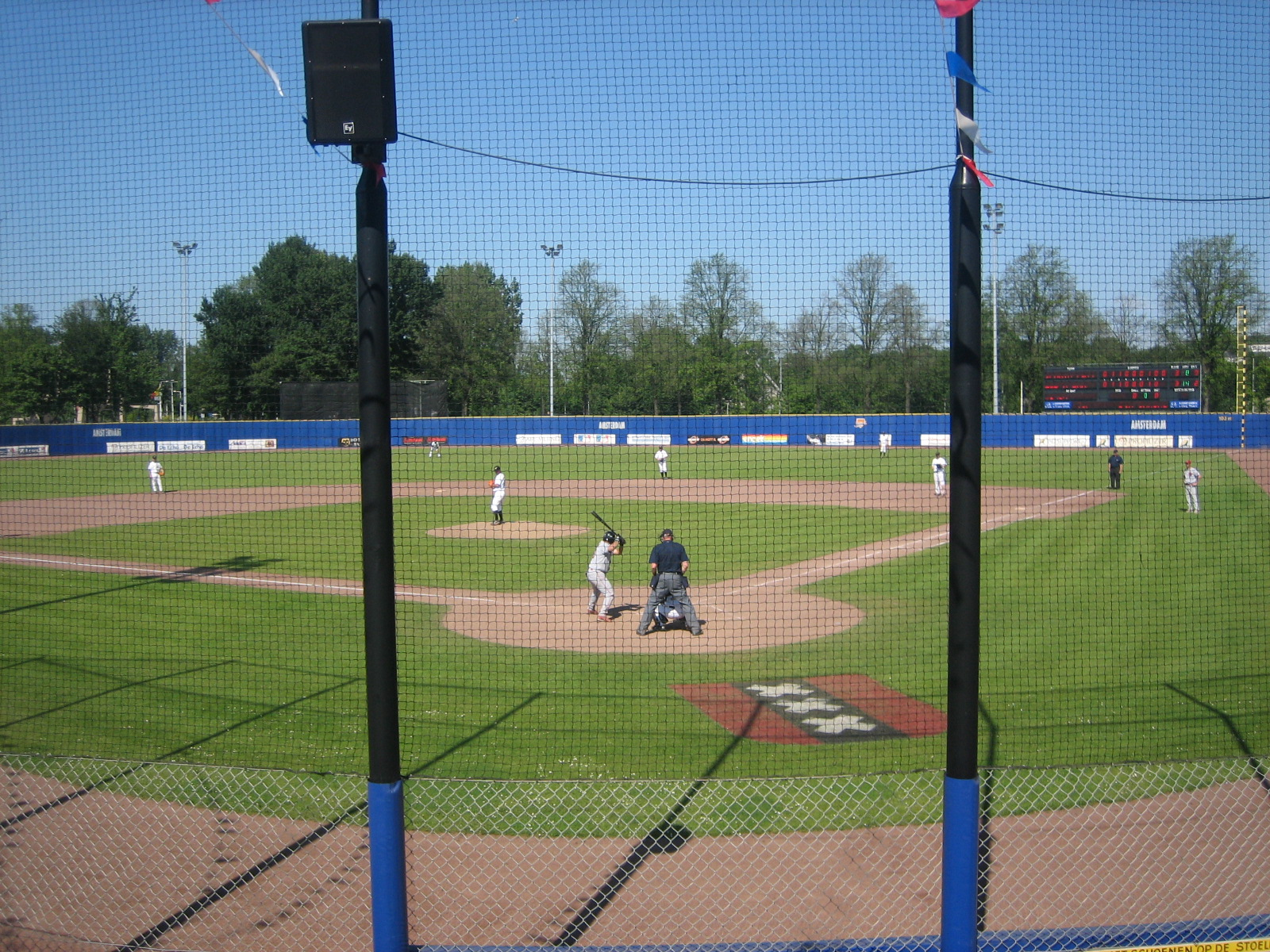
Loek Loevendie Ballpark

The Pirates play at the Loek Loevendie Ballpark located in Osdorp, in the west of Amsterdam. The Pirates moved to this stadium in 2000. The sports complex has a main and a secondary baseball field, two softball fields and an indoor hall and a restaurant.

The ballpark has hosted the 2005 Baseball World Cup, the 2007 European Softball Championship, the 2023 European Champions Cup.

In May 2019, the ballpark, originally named Sportpark Ookmeer, was renamed to Loek Loevendie Ballpark to honor Loek Loevendie, one of the founders of the Pirates.

== Roster ==
Amsterdam Pirates roster
Active roster		Coaches
Pitchers: 5 (Netherlands) Martin Schoonderwoerd; 7 (Netherlands) Dennis Burgersdijk; 15 (Netherlands) Dylan Farley; 17 (Netherlands) Danyll Redan; 25 (Netherlands) Pim Vijfvinkel; 29 (Netherlands) Jelle van der Lelie; 34 (Netherlands) Casper Rammeloo; 36 (Netherlands) Scott Prins; 39 (Netherlands) Lars Huijer; 48 (Netherlands) Connor Prins; 51 (Netherlands) Sedley Karel; 72 (Netherlands) Yassir Lachkar; 92 (Netherlands) Daan Hijzelendoorn	Catchers: 8 (Netherlands) Gabriel Salazar Mata; 28 (Netherlands) Ilyas van den Bos; 31 (Netherlands) Julian Goins; 84 (Netherlands) Mihai Bracacescu; Infielders: 4 (Curaçao) Junior Martina; 6 (Netherlands) Delano Selassa; 11 (Netherlands) Rafael Smeenk; 13 (Curaçao) Alex Madera; 18 (Netherlands) Jamie Beerman; 28 (Netherlands) Jorrit Penseel; 65 (Netherlands) Thibaud Pastor; Outfielders: 1 (Netherlands) Jason Jakobus; 8 (Netherlands) Victor Draijer; 16 (Netherlands) Brendly Martina; 23 (Netherlands) Tommy van de Sanden; 32 (Netherlands) Jeandro Tromp; 44 (Netherlands) Julian Toppen	Manager: 2 (Sint Maarten) Mervin Gario; Coaches: 21 (Netherlands) Gaetano Cristiano (Coach); 22 (Netherlands) Shane Gnade (Pitching Coach); 27 (Netherlands) Danny Rombley (Coach); 30 (Netherlands) Roeland Henrique (Coach); Roster updated on 23 April 2026

=== Retired numbers ===
The Amsterdam Pirates have retired the following numbers:

- 5 – Ronald Stoovelaar
- 14 – Charles Urbanus Jr.
- 19 – Rikkert Faneyte
- 35 – Peter van Erk
