= Parma Baseball Club =

Italian baseball team

1949 Parma BC
Logo
Cap insignia

Information
- League: Serie A
- Location: Parma, Italy
- Ballpark: Stadio Nino Cavalli
- Established: 1949; 77 years ago
- European Cup championships: 15 (1977, 1978, 1980, 1981, 1983, 1984, 1986, 1987, 1988, 1992, 1995, 1998, 1999, 2021, 2022)
- Scudetti: 12 (1976, 1977, 1981, 1982, 1985, 1991, 1994, 1995, 1997, 2010, 2024, 2026)
- Colors: Dark blue, silver and white

Current uniforms
Home	Away

1949 Parma Baseball Club is a professional baseball team that plays in the Serie A. Founded in 1949, the team is based in the city of Parma in Italy and plays its home games at the Stadio Nino Cavalli. It is currently the second-largest stadium in Italy after Nettuno's Steno Borghese, and along with Bologna's home park, often hosts Italian national team home games.

The club, managed by Gianguido Poma, finished the 2020 season with a 15-11 record, good for 3rd place in Italy, behind Bologna and San Marino. So far in 2021, Parma took home the European Champions Cup in July, their European record 14th title. Parma will play in a modified playoff later this month to determine if they will get the opportunity to defend their title and participate in the 2022 Champions Cup.

One of the most successful clubs in the Italian League, Parma has won 10 IBL championships, as well as 15 European Cup titles, the most in European baseball.

== History ==
=== 2019 ===
Italian national team players Sebastiano Poma (.380, 4 HR, 26 RBI), Aldo Koutsoyanopulos (.317, 1 HR, 11 RBI), Ricardo Paolini (.308, 1 HR, 17 RBI) led the offense. Veterans Charlie Mirabal (.297, 1 HR, 10 RBI) and Luca Scalera (.364, 1 HR, 8 RBI) also made their impact in the lineup. Erly Casanova led the pitching staff with 50.2 IP to go with a 3.02 ERA and 52 K. Marc-Andre Habeck (2.48 ERA, 38 K in 29.0 IP), Owen Ozanich (3.86 ERA, 18 K in 18.2 IP) and Yomel Rivera (4.50 ERA, 24 K in 18.0 IP) were also very steady. Veteran hurler Mauro Schiavoni proved to be an important addition, the right hander from Argentina posted a 0.00 ERA in the regular season, not allowing a single run in 11.1 IP. He also had an impressive 1.93 ERA in the Champions Cup. Parma finished 4th in the week long tournament where the top 8 club teams face off to crown the new European champion. In the event, Casanova and Habeck led the staff with 8.0 innings pitched, Habeck posted the best ERA (1.12), while Ozanich finished with a team high 9 strikeouts in 5.2 IP. Offensively, Koutsoyanopulos hit .421 (8-for-19), Paolini .353 (6-for-17), Mirabal .333 (5-for-15), Poma .313 (5-for-16) and Alex Sambucci .313 (5-for-16).

Parma found themselves in a rematch of the 2018 finals, this time in the semis, against rival Bologna. After shotting out to a 2-0 series lead, Parma lost three straight as Bologna came from behind, not only in the best of five series, but in game five as well. Erly Casanova was Parma's top playoff performer, logging 14.2 innings, allowing just two earned runs (1.23 ERA), walking one batter while striking out 15. Yomel Rivera (5.2 scoreless with 3 K), Junior Oberto (1 ER in 5 IP) and Marc-Andre Habeck (2 ER in 7.1 IP) also pitched well in the series. At the plate, in the playoffs, Ricky Paolini (.381), Rafael Vinales (.375), Stefano Desimoni (.333), and Mattia Mercuri (.300) were the club's .300 hitters. Longtime shortstop Charlie Mirabal injured his shoulder diving for a ball in the hole in Bologna, an injury that sidelined him for the first month of 2020 as well.

=== 2020 ===
The 2020 offseason saw many changes to the Parmaclima roster. Gone were pitchers Erly Casanova, Mauro Schiavoni, Marc-Andre Habeck and Junior Oberto. Infielder Mattia Mercuri and catcher Rafael Vinales also moved on from Parma. Alessandro Deotto returned to the club he called home in 2017 and 2018, Deotto started off hot, batting .344 with 3 home runs in 12 games before missing the second half of the 2020 season. Longtime infielder Luca Scalera opted to change clubs in 2020, moving to cross town Collecchio. Left-handed national team pitcher and current Cubs minor leaguer Luis Lugo along with righty Michele Pomponi were the club's two main starters. The 26-year-old Lugo posted a 6-0 record, 3.47 ERA in 59.2 innings for double-A Tennessee in 2019 and appeared in a 2020 MLB spring training game where he recorded a scoreless inning for Chicago. Lugo had previously pitched for Parma in 2018 before being signed as an international free agent, and returned following the cancellation of the 2020 minor league season. The big lefty posted a 3-3 record in 40.0 IP, striking out 69 while issuing only 10 walks to go with an impressive 1.40 ERA. Pomponi came back with Parma after having missed the entire 2019 season due to injury. The young righty logged 39.2 IP, striking out 48 to go with a 2.47 ERA. Italian national team hurlers Mattia Aldegheri (31.1 IP, 33 K, 4.02 ERA) and Yomel Rivera (18.0 IP, 30 K, 3.11 ERA) solidified the Parma bullpen. Philadelphia Phillies pitching prospect Samuel Aldegheri pitched well for Parma, posting a 2–0 record in 9.1 innings while striking out 13 to go with a 3.75 ERA. Veteran lefty Francesco Nardi (4-0 in 18.1 IP), two way player Francesco Pomponi (0 R in 3.2 IP, 3 K) Venezuelan righty Anthony Gonzalez (5.12 ERA in 13.2 IP) and French righty Owen Ozanich (2.0 IP, 0 R, 3 K) rounded out the bullpen.

The club's everyday lineup featured utility man Aldo Koutsoyanopulos (.230, 17 R, 12 SB), infielder Ricardo Paolini (.325, 1 HR, 5 SB), and centerfielder Sebastiano Poma (.380, 4 HR, 19 RBI) at the top of the order. First baseman Alex Sambucci (.265, 1 HR, 15 RBI), outfielders Leonardo Zileri (.311, 1 HR, 9 RBI), Stefano Desimoni (.333, 11 R, 9 RBI), and Alexander Viloria (.241, 1 HR, 14 RBI) batted in the heart of the order. Smooth fielding shortstop Charlie Mirabal (.286, 8 RBI, 4 SB) returned mid-way thru the season and added depth to Poma's lineup.

The 2020 season featured six teams, a 26 game regular season between July 8 and September 12. The top two regular season clubs, San Marino and Bologna advanced to the Italian Finals featured a best-of-seven series to be played between September 17–26. With a 15-11 record in 2020, Parma qualified for the 2021 European Champions Cup as the second Italian team alongside Fortitudo Bologna.

=== 2021 ===
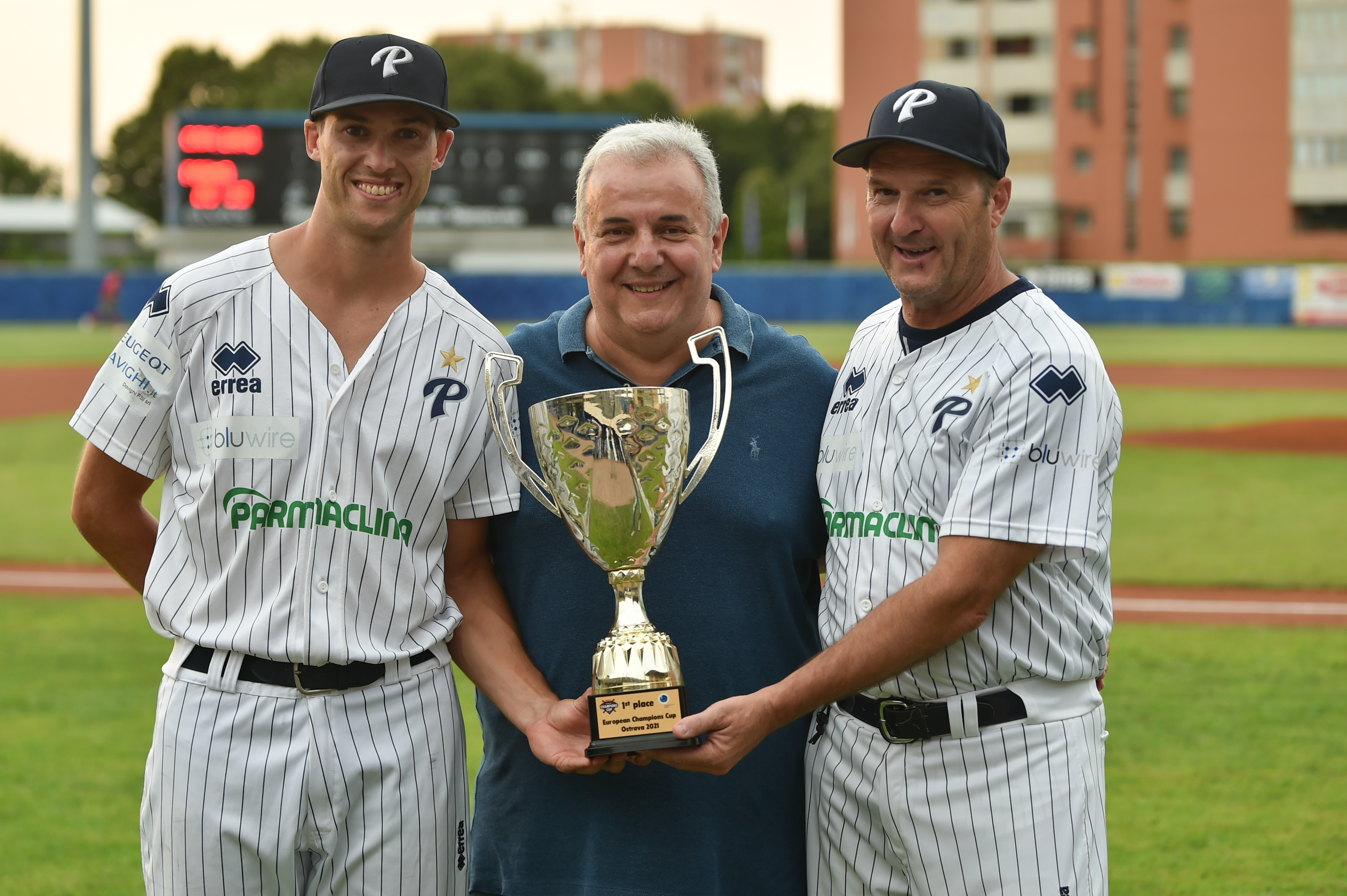
Parma Clima won its 14th European Cup in 2021.

The 2021 edition of Parma Clima will be remembered as the revamped 'squadra' which took home July 2021's European Champions Cup, hosted by Arrows Ostrava in the Czech Republic. First baseman Alex Sambucci took home tournament MVP honors, batting .333 with 3 homers and 7 driven in. First year third baseman and Spanish national team infielder Leo Rodriguez also blasted 3 homers in the week long event, while veteran outfielder Stefano Desimoni batted a team leading .421, also scoring 5 runs, leading Parma to a final victory over Bonn (Germany).

Prior to the start of the 2021 season, The Italian Serie A increased the number of clubs in the league to 32. Sebastiano Poma replaced Leonardo Zileri as the club's captain. Poma, a fixture on the Italian national team, hit .304 with 1 HR and 9 RBI in 2021. Offensively, the club was led by Cuban outfielder Noel Gonzalez (.420, 1 HR, 22 RBI), Alex Sambucci (.361, 3 HR, 18 RBI) and Rodriguez (.347, 6 HR, 26 RBI). On the mound, Michele Pomponi went 3-0 with a 0.53 ERA in 17.0 IP before suffering a season ending arm injury. Jose Campos (2-0, 1.59 in 34.0 IP) and Mattia Aldegheri (7-3, 3.74 in 53.0 IP) led the rotation. Yomel Rivera (2-0, 6.35 in 22.2 IP) and Danny Rondon (2-2, 5.63 in 24.O IP) made important contributions as well.

== Roster ==
Parma Baseball roster – Serie A 2026
Players		Coaches
Pitchers: 46 (Italy) Matteo Bocchi; 52 (Cuba) Erly Casanova; -- (Cuba) Naykel Cruz; -- (Cuba) Raymond Figueredo; 2 (Italy) Carlos Infante Jr.; 30 (Dominican Republic) Yomel Rivera; 77 (Dominican Republic) Manuel Santana; 44 (Italy) Claudio Scotti	Catchers: 16 (Italy) Cesare Astorri; 36 (Italy) Alberto Mineo; 38 (Italy) Marco Ragionieri; Infielders: 7 (Italy) Gabriele Angioi; 42 (Italy) Edoardo Cornelli; 15 (Dominican Republic) Robel García; 19 (Dominican Republic) Manuel Geraldo; 5 (Venezuela) Ericson Leonora; Outfielders: 12 (Italy) Tommaso Battioni; 18 (Italy) Sebastiano Catellani; 6 (Italy) Riccardo Flisi; 39 (Cuba) Noel González; 11 (Italy) Federico Tiburtini	Manager: -- (Italy) Marcello Saccardi; Coaches: -- (Cuba) Frank Morejón (bench coach); -- (Venezuela) Elvis Rivas (coach); -- (Venezuela) Pedro Orta (pitching)
