= List of German baseball teams =

The following German Baseball teams, in the 2026 season, will participate in the 1st and 2nd divisions of the Baseball Bundesliga:

== DBL North ==
- Bonn Capitals
- Cologne Cardinals
- Dortmund Wanderers
- Hamburg Stealers
- Hünstetten Storm
- Paderborn Untouchables

== DBL South ==
- Gauting Indians
- Guggenberger Legionäre
- Heidenheim Heideköpfe
- Mainz Athletics
- München-Haar Disciples
- Stuttgart Reds

== 2. Bundesliga North ==
=== North ===
- Bremen Dockers
- Dohren Wild Farmers
- Hamburg Knights
- Hamburg Marines
- Hamburg Stealers (reserve team)
- Kiel Seahawks

=== North-East ===
- Berlin Ausbau Roadrunners
- Berlin Flamingos
- Berlin Skylarks
- Braunschweig 89ers
- Wolfsburg Blackbirds

=== North-West ===
- Bonn Capitals (reserve team)
- Cologne Cardinals (reserve team)
- Düsseldorf Senators
- Neunkirchen Nightmares
- Paderborn Untouchables (reserve team)
- Solingen Alligators
- Wuppertal Stingrays

== 2. Bundesliga South ==
=== South-East ===
- Bayerische Baseball Academy
- Freising Grizzlies
- Füssen Royal Bavarians
- Garching Atomics
- Gauting Indians (reserve team)
- Guggenberger Legionäre (reserve team)
- München Caribes
- Schwaig Red Lions

=== South-West 1 ===
- Bad Homburg Hornets
- Darmstadt Whippets
- Mainz Athletics (reserve team)
- Mannheim Tornados
- Saarlouis Hornets
- Schriesheim Raubritter

=== South-West 2 ===
- Heidenheim Heideköpfe (reserve team)
- Neuenburg Atomics
- Gammertingen Royals
- Stuttgart Reds (reserve team)
- Tübingen Hawks
