= Germany national baseball team =

Information
- Country: Germany
- Federation: German Baseball and Softball Federation
- Confederation: WBSC Europe
- Manager: Jendrick Speer

WBSC ranking
- Current: 17 ▲1 (26 March 2026)
- Highest: 17 (December 2012)
- Lowest: 22 (2 times; latest in December 2018)

European Championship
- Best result: 2nd (1957)

The Germany national baseball team is the national baseball team for Germany. They are a contender for the European Baseball Championship, and have competed in the Baseball World Cup. Jendrick Speer is the manager, since March 2023.

== Results and fixtures ==
The following is a list of professional baseball match results currently active in the latest version of the WBSC World Rankings, as well as any future matches that have been scheduled.

Legend

Win Lose Void or postponed Fixture

=== 2026 ===
WBSC Premier12 Q	October 9	Germany	v	Spain	Anella Olímpica, Spain
WBSC Premier12 Q	19:00 CEST

WBSC Premier12 Q	October 10	Germany	v	Colombia	Anella Olímpica, Spain
WBSC Premier12 Q	12:00 CEST

WBSC Premier12 Q	October 11	Italy	v	Germany	Anella Olímpica, Spain
WBSC Premier12 Q	12:00 CEST

=== 2025 ===
World Baseball Classic Q	March 2	China	2–12 (F/7)	Germany	Kino Sports Complex, United States
World Baseball Classic Q	11:00 MST	LP: Yanlun Zhang (0–1)	Boxscore	WP: Markus Solbach (1–0); HR: Donald Lutz (1)	Attendance: 1,549; Umpires: Tanner Moore (HP), Alan Izaguirre (1B), Harley Acosta (2B), Alessandro Spera (3B)

World Baseball Classic Q	March 3	Brazil	9–7	Germany	Kino Sports Complex, United States
World Baseball Classic Q	11:00 MST	WP: Enzo Sawayama (1–0); Sv: Eric Pardinho (1)	Boxscore	LP: Jaden Agassi (0–1)	Attendance: 2,193; Umpires: Casey James (HP), Tanner Moore (1B), Wilfredo Montoya (2B), Trevor Dannegger (3B)

World Baseball Classic Q	March 4	Germany	0–10 (F/7)	Colombia	Kino Sports Complex, United States
World Baseball Classic Q	18:00 MST	LP: Mark Harrison (0–1)	Boxscore	WP: Adrian Almeida (1–0)	Attendance: 2,137; Umpires: Alessandro Spera (HP), Trevor Dannegger (1B), Alan Izaguirre (2B), Casey James (3B)

World Baseball Classic Q	March 6	Germany	4–6	Brazil	Kino Sports Complex, United States
World Baseball Classic Q	18:00 MST	LP: Niklas Rimmel (0–1)	Boxscore	WP: Pedro Da Costa Lemos (1–0); Sv: Murilo Gouvea (1)	Attendance: 2,247; Umpires: Harley Acosta (HP), Tanner Moore (1B), Casey James (2B), Alessandro Spera (3B)

=== 2022 ===
World Baseball Classic Q	September 17	Great Britain	8–1	Germany	Armin-Wolf-Arena, Germany
World Baseball Classic Q	19:00 CET	WP: Akeel Morris (1-0); HR: Justin Wylie (1), Harry Ford (2)	Boxscore	LP: Brian Flynn (0-1)	Attendance: 2,216; Umpires: Tyler Jones (HP), Jon Byrne (1B), Sam Burch (2B), Young Chou Kwon (3B)

World Baseball Classic Q	September 19	South Africa	5–11	Germany	Armin-Wolf-Arena, Germany
World Baseball Classic Q	12:00 CET	LP: Kevin Townend (0-1); HR: Dayle Feldtman (1)	Boxscore	WP: Nick Wittgren (1-0); Sv: Sascha Koch (1); HR: William Germaine (1), Demetrius Moorer (1, 2)	Attendance: 920; Umpires: Sam Burch (HP), Tyler Jones (1B), Young Chou Kwon (2B), Kyohei Makita (3B)

World Baseball Classic Q	September 20	Czech Republic	8–4	Germany	Armin-Wolf-Arena, Germany
World Baseball Classic Q	13:00 CET	WP: Daniel Padysak (1-0); Sv: Michal Kovala (1); HR: Peter Zyma (1), Martin Cervenka (1, 2)	Boxscore	LP: Michael Bienlien (0-1); HR: William Germaine (1)	Attendance: 1,102; Umpires: Kyohei Makita (HP), Tyler Jones (1B), Mark Winters (2B), Darius Gahni (3B)

=== 2021 ===
Friendly	September 3	Germany	8–5	Austria	Wiener Neustadt, Austria
Friendly			Boxscore

Friendly	September 5	Germany	6–3	Czech Republic	Wiener Neustadt, Austria
Friendly			Boxscore

Friendly	September 6	Germany	5–4	Austria	Wiener Neustadt, Austria
Friendly			Boxscore

Euro Championship GS	September 12	Germany	2–8	Croatia	Turin, Italy
Euro Championship GS			Boxscore

Euro Championship GS	September 13	Spain	15–2 (F/7)	Germany	Settimo Torinese, Italy
Euro Championship GS			Boxscore

Euro Championship GS	September 14	Ukraine	5–15 (F/7)	Germany	Avigliana, Italy
Euro Championship GS			Boxscore

Euro Championship RR	September 15	Germany	3–2	France	Turin, Italy
Euro Championship RR			Boxscore

Euro Championship RR	September 16	Sweden	2–13 (F/7)	Germany	Turin, Italy
Euro Championship RR			Boxscore

Euro Championship 9th	September 18	Russia	1–4	Germany	Turin, Italy
Euro Championship 9th			Boxscore

=== 2019 ===
Euro Championship GS	September 7	Sweden	1–9	Germany	Solingen, Germany
Euro Championship GS	21:30 CET		Boxscore		Attendance: 1,900

Euro Championship GS	September 8	Germany	1–0	Great Britain	Bonn, Germany
Euro Championship GS	19:30 CET		Boxscore		Attendance: 1,350

Euro Championship GS	September 9	Germany	2–4 (F/10)	Israel	Bonn, Germany
Euro Championship GS	19:00 CET		Boxscore		Attendance: 500

Euro Championship GS	September 10	Netherlands	8–1	Germany	Bonn, Germany
Euro Championship GS	19:00 CET		Boxscore		Attendance: 1,100

Euro Championship GS	September 11	Germany	6–10	Czech Republic	Bonn, Germany
Euro Championship GS	19:00 CET		Boxscore		Attendance: 700

Euro Championship QF	September 13	Italy	7–5	Germany	Bonn, Germany
Euro Championship QF	19:00 CET		Boxscore		Attendance: 1,000

Euro Championship CG	September 14	France	4–14 (F/7)	Germany	Bonn, Germany
Euro Championship CG	11:00 CET		Boxscore		Attendance: 800

Euro Championship 5th	September 15	Czech Republic	4–3	Germany	Bonn, Germany
Euro Championship 5th	11:00 CET		Boxscore		Attendance: 1,900

=== 2018 ===
Friendly	July 4	Germany	3–12	Czech Republic	Prague, Czech Republic
Friendly			Boxscore

Friendly	July 5	Germany	5–15	Czech Republic	Prague, Czech Republic
Friendly			Boxscore

Friendly	July 6	Germany	2–4	Czech Republic	Prague, Czech Republic
Friendly			Boxscore

Haarlem Baseball Week GS	July 13	Germany	0–6	Netherlands	Haarlem, Netherlands
Haarlem Baseball Week GS			Boxscore

Haarlem Baseball Week GS	July 14	Germany	5–4	Cuba	Haarlem, Netherlands
Haarlem Baseball Week GS			Boxscore

Haarlem Baseball Week GS	July 16	Japan	6–1	Germany	Haarlem, Netherlands
Haarlem Baseball Week GS			Boxscore

Haarlem Baseball Week GS	July 18	Germany	3–11	Chinese Taipei	Haarlem, Netherlands
Haarlem Baseball Week GS			Boxscore

Haarlem Baseball Week GS	July 19	Italy	3–1	Germany	Haarlem, Netherlands
Haarlem Baseball Week GS			Boxscore

Haarlem Baseball Week R1R	July 20	Germany	1–7	Cuba	Haarlem, Netherlands
Haarlem Baseball Week R1R			Boxscore

Super 6 GS	September 18	Germany	1–11 (F/7)	Italy	Hoofddorp, Netherlands
Super 6 GS	11:00 CET		Boxscore		Attendance: 89

Super 6 GS	September 19	Netherlands	13–1 (F/7)	Germany	Hoofddorp, Netherlands
Super 6 GS	19:30 CET		Boxscore		Attendance: 650

Super 6 GS	September 20	Spain	9–1	Germany	Hoofddorp, Netherlands
Super 6 GS	15:00 CET		Boxscore		Attendance: 142

Super 6 GS	September 21	Germany	6–7	Belgium	Hoofddorp, Netherlands
Super 6 GS	11:00 CET		Boxscore		Attendance: 73

Super 6 GS	September 22	Czech Republic	4–5	Germany	Hoofddorp, Netherlands
Super 6 GS	11:00 CET		Boxscore		Attendance: 221

== Current roster ==
Germany roster – 2026 World Baseball Classic Qualifier
Players		Coaches
Pitchers: 25 Jaden Agassi; 12 Joe Cedano-De Leon; 50 Jake Gilbert; 37 Marcel Giraud; 17 Simon Gross; 28 Mark Harrison; 9 Sascha Koch; 23 Jordan Martinson; 24 Christian Pedrol; 41 Niklas Rimmel; 34 Sven Schüller; 19 Markus Solbach; 26 Tommy Sommer; 29 Duke von Schamann; 62 Nick Wittgren	Catchers: 5 Vincent Ahrens; 15 Yannic Walther; Infielders: 35 Simon Baumer; 3 Simon Baumgardt; 33 Finn Bergmann; 30 Eric Brenk; 18 Tristan Russell; 6 Alexander Schmidt; Outfielders: 10 Lucas Dunn; 13 Lou Helmig; 7 Shawn Larry; 61 Donald Lutz; 27 Luca Rammelmann	Manager: 14 Jendrick Speer; Coaches: 31 Maurice Wilhelm (bench); 39 Alex Baham (hitting); 1 Octavio Medina (infield); 32 Clemens Cichocki (pitching); 11 Mike Bolsenbroek (bullpen coach); 8 Maurice Bendrien (bullpen catcher)

== 2016 team ==
Roster for 2016 World Baseball Classic Qualifiers.

Manager: Garth Iorg
Coaches: Willie Upshaw, Dennis Cook, Martin Helmig, Troy Williams.

Pos.	No.	Player	Date of birth (age)	Bats	Throws	Club
P		Sven Schüller				(United States) Los Angeles Dodgers
P		Markus Solbach				(United States) Arizona Diamondbacks
P		Jan-Niclas Stöcklin				(Germany) Mainz Athletics
P		Daniel Thieben				(Germany) Paderborn Untouchables
P		Maurice Wilhelm				(Germany) Bonn Capitals
P		Daniel Thieben				(Germany) Paderborn Untouchables
P		Luke Sommer				(Germany) Heidenheim Heideköpfe
P		Lukas Steinlein				(Germany) München-Haar Disciples
P		Will Ohman				(United States) MLB Retiree
P		Enorbel Marquez				(Germany) Retired
P		Sascha Koch				(Germany) Bonn Capitals
P		Lucas Dickman				(Germany) Mainz Athletics
P		Martin Diego Velad				(Germany) Heidenheim Heideköpfe
C		Christopher Howard				(Germany) Buchbinder Legionäre Regensburg
C		Bruce Maxwell				(United States) Oakland Athletics
C		Simon Gühring				(Germany) Heidenheim Heideköpfe
IF		Eric Brenk				(Germany) Bonn Capitals
IF		Ludwig Glaser				(Germany) Buchbinder Legionäre Regensburg
IF		Daniel Hinz				(Germany) Paderborn Untouchables
IF		Lukas Jahn				(Germany) Buchbinder Legionäre Regensburg
IF		Nadir Ljatifi				(United States) Cincinnati Reds
IF		Donald Lutz				(United States) Cincinnati Reds
IF		Christoph Ziegler				(Germany) München-Haar Disciples
IF		Kevin Trisl				(Germany) München-Haar Disciples
OF		Max Boldt				(Germany) Mainz Athletics
OF		Dominique Taylor				(United States) Kansas City Royals
OF		Kevin Kotowski				(Germany) Mainz Athletics
OF		Sascha Lutz				(Germany) Heidenheim Heideköpfe
OF		Kent Matthes				(United States) Lancaster Barnstormers

== Previous team ==
Roster for 2012 World Baseball Classic Qualifiers.

Manager: Erich Kittlaus
Coaches: Terry Abbott, Justin Pope, Gene Roof, Troy Williams.

Pos.	No.	Player	Date of birth (age)	Bats	Throws	Club
P	20	Mike Bolsenbroek	March 11, 1987			Buchbinder Legionäre
P	9	Alex Burgos	December 1, 1990			(United States) Lakeland Flying Tigers
P	5	Martin Dewald	March 5, 1986			Heidenheim Heideköpfe
P	15	Harry Glynne	June 3, 1990			Solingen Alligators
P	6	Eugen Heilmann	June 12, 1981			Paderborn Untouchables
P	29	Andre Hughes	January 1, 1985			Solingen Alligators
P	32	Adam Kudryk	December 31, 1987			
P	46	Justin Kuehn	December 31, 1987			Buchbinder Legionäre
P	23	Enorbel Marquez	December 11, 1974			(Italy) Telemarket Rimini
P	13	Will Ohman	August 13, 1977			Free agent
P	21	Markus Solbach	August 26, 1991			(United States) Windy City ThunderBolts
P	30	Luke Sommer	June 22, 1985			Heidenheim Heideköpfe
P	17	Daniel Thieben	September 18, 1993			(United States) Pulaski Mariners
C	19	Kai Gronauer	November 28, 1986			(United States) Las Vegas 51s
IF	11	Maximilian Boldt	September 1, 1988			Mainz Athletics
IF	33	Michael Franke	September 22, 1981			HSV Stealers
IF	31	Toby Gardenhire	September 11, 1982			Free agent
IF	28	Ludwig Glaser	December 19, 1987			Buchbinder Legionäre
IF	39	Donald Lutz	February 6, 1989			(United States) Cincinnati Reds
IF	14	Jendrick Speer	September 26, 1980			Paderborn Untouchables
IF	7	Matthew Vance	June 28, 1986			Buchbinder Legionäre
IF	3	Matt Weaver	January 27, 1990			(United States) Danville Braves
OF	22	Aaron Altherr	January 14, 1991			(United States) Philadelphia Phillies
OF	24	Max Kepler	August 27, 1993			(United States) Minnesota Twins
OF	26	Mike Larson	August 27, 1983			Mainz Athletics
OF	12	Eric Suttle	July 17, 1984			(United States) Lexington Legends
DH	16	Simon Gühring	July 14, 1983			Heidenheim Heideköpfe
DH	18	Jake Shaffer	August 16, 1987			Retired list

== International tournament results ==
=== World Baseball Classic ===
World Baseball Classic record							Qualification record			
Year	Round	Position	W	L	RS	RA	W	L	RS	RA
2006	did not enter						No qualifiers held			
2009	did not enter						No qualifiers held			
2013	did not qualify						2	2	40	29
2017	did not qualify						0	2	7	20
2023	did not qualify						1	2	16	21
2026	did not qualify						1	3	23	27
Total	-	0/6	-	-	-	-	4	9	86	97

=== Baseball World Cup ===
- 1972 : 16th
- 1973 : 11th
- 2007 : 14th
- 2009 : 17th
- 2011 : 15th

=== European Baseball Championship ===
Team Germany competed in the 2019 European Baseball Championship, and came in 6th. Among the players who competed for it were Donald Lutz and Markus Solbach.

- 1954 : 4th
- 1955 : (bronze) 3rd
- 1956 : 5th
- 1957 : 2nd
- 1958 : (bronze) 3rd
- 1960 : did not qualify
- 1962 : 5th
- 1964 : did not qualify
- 1965 : (bronze) 3rd
- 1967 : (bronze) 3rd

- 1969 : 4th
- 1971 : (bronze) 3rd
- 1973 : did not qualify
- 1975 : (bronze) 3rd
- 1977 : did not qualify
- 1979 : did not qualify
- 1981 : did not qualify
- 1983 : did not qualify
- 1985 : did not qualify
- 1987 : 7th

- 1989 : 8th
- 1991 : did not qualify
- 1993 : 7th
- 1995 : 6th
- 1997 : 10th
- 1999 : 10th
- 2001 : 7th
- 2003 : 12th
- 2005 : 4th
- 2007 : 4th

- 2010 : (bronze) 3rd
- 2012 : 4th
- 2014 : 5th
- 2016 : 4th
- 2019 : 6th
- 2021 : 9th
- 2023 : 4th
- 2025 : 5th
