= 2017 European Champions Cup (baseball) =

Tournament details
- Country: Germany
- Dates: June 7 – 11
- Teams: 8
- Defending champions: (Netherlands) L&D Amsterdam

Final positions
- Champions: (Netherlands) Curaçao Neptunus (9th title)
- Runners-up: (Italy) CNF Unipolsai Bologna

Tournament statistics
- Games played: 19
- Attendance: 6,235 (328 per game)

The 2017 European Champions Cup is a European baseball competition, that was held from June 7, to 11, 2017 in Regensburg, Germany. This is the fifty-fifth iteration of the Cup since its inaugural tournament in 1963.

== List of competing teams ==
(Italy) CNF Unipolsai Bologna (1st)	(Italy) A.S.D. Rimini (2nd)
(Netherlands) Curaçao Neptunus (1st)	(Netherlands) L&D Amsterdam (2nd)
(Germany) Mainz Athletics (1st)	(Germany) Buchbinder Legionäre (2nd)
T&A San Marino	(France) Rouen Huskies

== Venues ==
Field A	Field B
(Germany) Regensburg	(Germany) Regensburg
Armin-Wolf-Arena	Platz 1

== First round ==
Qualified for Final Four
Qualified for Bottom Four

=== Group A ===
Rk	Team	W	L	Pct.	GB
1	(Italy) CNF Unipolsai Bologna	2	1	.667	0
2	(Netherlands) Curaçao Neptunus	2	1	.667	0
3	(France) Rouen Huskies	1	2	.333	2
4	(Germany) Mainz Athletics	1	2	.333	2

Date	Local time	Road team	Score	Home team	Inn.	Venue	Game duration	Attendance	Boxscore
Jun 7, 2017	13:30	Curaçao Neptunus (Netherlands)	12-6	(Italy) CNF Unipolsai Bologna		Armin Wolf Arena	3:24	175	Boxscore
Jun 7, 2017	16:30	Rouen Huskies (France)	17-7	(Germany) Mainz Athletics	8	Platz 1	3:28	120	Boxscore
Jun 8, 2017	11:00	CNF Unipolsai Bologna (Italy)	14-0	(France) Rouen Huskies	7	Platz 1	2:14	130	Boxscore
Jun 8, 2017	13:30	Mainz Athletics (Germany)	7-6	(Netherlands) Curaçao Neptunus		Armin-Wolf-Arena	2:43	180	Boxscore
Jun 9, 2017	11:00	Mainz Athletics (Germany)	2-22	(Italy) CNF Unipolsai Bologna	7	Platz 1	2:39	130	Boxscore
Jun 9, 2017	13:30	Curaçao Neptunus (Netherlands)	9-3	(France) Rouen Huskies		Armin-Wolf-Arena	3:14	296	Boxscore

=== Group B ===
Rk	Team	W	L	Pct.	GB
1	(Netherlands) L&D Amsterdam	3	0	1.000	0
2	T&A San Marino	2	1	.667	1
3	(Italy) A.S.D. Rimini	1	2	.333	2
4	(Germany) Buchbinder Legionäre	0	3	.000	3

Date	Local time	Road team	Score	Home team	Inn.	Venue	Game duration	Attendance	Boxscore
Jun 7, 2017	11:00	L&D Amsterdam (Netherlands)	5-1	T&A San Marino		Platz 1	2:39	120	Boxscore
Jun 7, 2016	19:00	Buchbinder Legionäre (Germany)	2-5	(Italy) A.S.D. Rimini		Arwin-Wolf-Arena	3:13	320	Boxscore
Jun 8, 2017	16:30	A.S.D. Rimini (Italy)	2-9	(Netherlands) L&D Amsterdam		Platz 1	3:17	180	Boxscore
Jun 8, 2017	19:00	T&A San Marino	13-1	(Germany) Buchbinder Legionäre	7	Armin-Wolf-Arena	2:13	510	Boxscore
Jun 9, 2017	16:30	A.S.D. Rimini (Italy)	3-6	T&A San Marino	10	Platz 1	3:44	100	Boxscore
Jun 9, 2017	19:00	L&D Amsterdam (Netherlands)	9-6	(Germany) Buchbinder Legionäre		Armin-Wolf-Arena	2:43	705	Boxscore

== Bottom Four ==
Game 1

June 10 11:00 at Platz 1
Team	1	2	3	4	5	6	7	8	9	R	H	E
(Germany) Mainz Athletics	0	3	1	2	1	0	1	0	0	8	8	1
(Italy) A.S.D. Rimini	6	1	1	0	3	0	2	0	X	13	15	3
WP: (Italy) (Venezuela) Jose Escalona (1-0) LP: (Canada) Jeff Hunt (0-1); Home runs: MAI: None; RIM: (Italy) Federico Celli (1); Attendance: 90; Umpires: HP − (Spain) Jerónimo Moreno Saura, 1B − (Netherlands) Edwin Louisa, 3B − (Germany) Tim Meyer; Boxscore

Game 2

June 10 13:30 at Armin-Wolf-Arena
Team	1	2	3	4	5	6	7	8	9	R	H	E
(Germany) Buchbinder Legionäre	0	2	0	0	0	X	X	X	X	2	3	1
(France) Rouen Huskies	4	8	1	5	X	X	X	X	X	18	15	1
WP: (France) (Cuba) Léo Céspedes (1-0) LP: (Germany) (United States) Eric Faint (0-1); Home runs: REG: None; ROU: (Canada) Gabriel Fromental-Houle (2), (France) Maxime Lefevre (1); Attendance: 693; Umpires: HP − (Netherlands) Stenar van Gronigen Schinkel, 1B − (Italy) Fabrizio Fabrizi, 3B − (Italy) Alessandro Spera; Notes: Completed early due to 15–run mercy rule after 5 innings. Boxscore

Relegation Game

June 11 16:00 at Armin-Wolf-Arena
Team	1	2	3	4	5	6	7	8	9	R	H	E
(Germany) Mainz Athletics	0	0	2	0	0	2	0	0	0	4	4	2
(Germany) Buchbinder Legionäre	0	0	0	0	0	2	0	0	1	3	5	0
WP: (Germany) Tim Stahlmann (1-1) LP: (Netherlands) Mike Bolsenbroek (0-2) Sv: (Germany) Lennard Stöcklin (1); Home runs: MAI: (Germany) Max Boldt (3), (Germany) Kevin Kotowski (1); REG: None; Attendance: 535; Umpires: HP − (Netherlands) Edwin Louisa, 1B − (Italy) Alessandro Spera, 3B − (Netherlands) Stenar van Groningen Schinkel; Boxscore

== Final four ==
Semi-Final 1

June 10 16:30 at Platz 1
Team	1	2	3	4	5	6	7	8	9	R	H	E
T&A San Marino	0	0	0	0	0	0	0	0	1	1	8	1
(Netherlands) Curaçao Neptunus	0	0	0	1	1	0	5	0	X	7	8	0
WP: (Netherlands) Diegomar Markwell (1-0) LP: (Italy) (United States) Josh Kimborowicz (0-1); Attendance: 207; Umpires: HP − (Germany) Dirk Biehl, 1B − (Germany) Tim Meyer, 3B − (Czech Republic) Miroslav Kaigl; Boxscore

Semi-Final 2

June 10 19:00 at Armin-Wolf-Arena
Team	1	2	3	4	5	6	7	8	9	R	H	E
(Italy) CNF Unipolsai Bologna	0	0	4	0	3	0	1	1	0	9	12	2
(Netherlands) L&D Amsterdam	0	0	0	0	1	4	0	3	0	8	8	2
WP: (Venezuela) Raul Rivero (1-0) LP: (Netherlands) Robin Schel (0-1) Sv: (Italy) Filippo Crepaldi (1); Home runs: BOL: (Italy) Paolino Ambrosino (1), (Italy) (Dominican Republic) Robel García (1), (Venezuela) Osman Marval (1), (Italy) (Dominican Republic) Alexander Russo (1); AMS: (Netherlands) Max Clarijs (1); Attendance: 417; Umpires: HP − (Austria) Oswald Tschaurf, 1B − (France) Serge Makouchetchev, 3B − (Italy) Fabrizio Fabrizi; Boxscore

3rd Place

June 11 13:30 at Platz 1
Team	1	2	3	4	5	6	7	8	9	R	H	E
(Netherlands) L&D Amsterdam	0	0	1	0	2	0	0	0	0	3	7	2
T&A San Marino	0	2	1	0	2	2	0	0	X	7	12	3
WP: (Venezuela) Yoimer Camacho (1-0) LP: (Netherlands) Kevin Heijstek (1-1); Home runs: AMS: None; SMR: (Italy) (Venezuela) Erick Epifano (1); Attendance: 79; Umpires: HP − (Germany) Tim Meyer, 1B − (Czech Republic) Miroslav Kaigl, 3B − (Spain) Jerónimo Merino Saura; Boxscore

Final

June 11 19:00 at Armin-Wolf-Arena
Team	1	2	3	4	5	6	7	8	9	R	H	E
(Netherlands) Curaçao Neptunus	2	0	0	0	0	0	4	1	0	7	13	2
(Italy) CNF Unipolsai Bologna	0	0	0	0	1	1	0	1	0	3	8	3
WP: (Czech Republic) Jan Tomek (1-0) LP: (United States) Rudy Owens (0-2) Sv: (Netherlands) Berry Van Driel (1); Home runs: ROT: (Netherlands) Shaldimar Daantji; BOL: None; Attendance: 1248; Umpires: HP − (France) Serge Makouchetchev, 1B − (Austria) Oswald Tschaurf, 3B − (Germany) Dirk Biehl; Boxscore

== Final standings ==
Champion
Relegated to CEB Cup

Rk	Team
1	(Netherlands) Curaçao Neptunus
2	(Italy) CNF Unipolsai Bologna
3	T&A San Marino
4	(Netherlands) L&D Amsterdam
5^{*}	(Italy) A.S.D. Rimini
5^{*}	(France) Rouen Huskies
7	(Germany) Mainz Athletics
8	(Germany) Buchbinder Legionäre

^{*} Both teams share 5th place.

== Statistics leaders ==
=== Batting ===
Statistic	Name	Total/Avg
Batting average	(Italy) Paolino Ambrosino (BOL)	.615
Hits	(Italy) Paolino Ambrosino (BOL) (Italy) (Dominican Republic) Robel García (BOL)	8
Runs	(Italy) Francesco Fuzzi (BOL)	8
Home runs	(Germany) Max Boldt (MAI)	3
RBI	(Italy) (Dominican Republic) Robel García (BOL)	10
Walks	(Germany) Elias von Garβen (REG)	6
Stolen bases	(Italy) Alessandro Vaglio (BOL) (Italy) Francesco Fuzzi (BOL) (Italy) (United States) Giovanni Garbella (RIM)	2
On-base percentage	(Italy) Alex Sambucci (BOL)	.706
Slugging percentage	(Canada) Gabriel Fromental-Houle (ROU)	1.200
OBPS	(Italy) Alex Sambucci (BOL)	1.706

=== Pitching ===
Statistic	Name	Total/Avg
Wins	12 players	1
Losses	(Netherlands) Mike Bolsenbroek (REG)	2
Saves	4 players	1
Innings pitched	(Netherlands) Mike Bolsenbroek (REG)	13.2
Hits allowed	(Italy) Mateo Bocchi (BOL)	0
Runs allowed	(Italy) Mateo Bocchi (BOL) (Dominican Republic) José Rosario (RIM)	0
Earned runs allowed	(Italy) Mateo Bocchi (BOL) (Dominican Republic) José Rosario (RIM)	0
ERA	(Italy) Mateo Bocchi (BOL) (Dominican Republic) José Rosario (RIM)	0.00
Walks	(Italy) Mateo Bocchi (BOL) (Italy) Andrea Pizziconi (BOL)	1
Strikeouts/Game	(Dominican Republic) José Rosario (RIM)	10

== See also ==
- European Baseball Championship
- Asia Series
- Caribbean Series
- Baseball awards § Europe
