= German champions (baseball) =

In baseball, the German championship of the men is determined in the Baseball Bundesliga.

In softball, the German championship of the women is determined in the Softball Bundesliga.

A championship of the gentlemen in softball, or the ladies in baseball, does not exist at present.

== German Men's Champions ==
=== 1951–1970 ===
- 1951: BC Stuttgart
- 1952: Frankfurt Juniors
- 1953: Frankfurt Juniors
- 1954: Mannheim Knights
- 1955: Frankfurt Juniors
- 1956: Mannheim Knights
- 1957: MEV München
- 1958: Mannheim Knights
- 1959: Mannheim Knights
- 1960: TB Germania Mannheim
- 1961: TB Germania Mannheim
- 1962: FC Bayern München
- 1963: TB Germania Mannheim
- 1964: TB Germania Mannheim
- 1965: VfR Mannheim
- 1966: VfR Mannheim
- 1967: Colt 45 Darmstadt
- 1968: Colt 45 Darmstadt
- 1969: FC Bayern München
- 1970: VfR Mannheim

=== 1982–present ===
- 1982: Mannheim Tornados
- 1983: Mannheim Amigos
- 1984: Mannheim Tornados
- 1985: Mannheim Tornados
- 1986: Mannheim Tornados
- 1987: Mannheim Tornados
- 1988: Mannheim Tornados
- 1989: Mannheim Tornados
- 1990: Köln Cardinals
- 1991: Mannheim Tornados
- 1992: Mannheim Amigos
- 1993: Mannheim Tornados
- 1994: Mannheim Tornados
- 1995: Trier Cardinals
- 1996: Trier Cardinals
- 1997: Mannheim Tornados
- 1998: Köln Dodgers
- 1999: Paderborn Untouchables
- 2000: Lokstedt Stealers
- 2001: Paderborn Untouchables
- 2002: Paderborn Untouchables
- 2003: Paderborn Untouchables
- 2004: Paderborn Untouchables
- 2005: Paderborn Untouchables
- 2006: Solingen Alligators
- 2007: Mainz Athletics
- 2008: Buchbinder Legionäre Regensburg
- 2009: Heidenheim Heideköpfe
- 2010: Buchbinder Legionäre Regensburg
- 2011: Buchbinder Legionäre Regensburg
- 2012: Buchbinder Legionäre Regensburg
- 2013: Buchbinder Legionäre Regensburg
- 2014: Solingen Alligators
- 2015: Heidenheim Heideköpfe
- 2016: Mainz Athletics
- 2017: Heidenheim Heideköpfe
- 2018: Bonn Capitals
- 2019: Heidenheim Heideköpfe
- 2020: Heidenheim Heideköpfe
- 2021: Heidenheim Heideköpfe
- 2022: Bonn Capitals
- 2023: Heidenheim Heideköpfe
- 2024: Bonn Capitals
- 2025: Heidenheim Heideköpfe

== German Women's Champions (softball) ==
- (1981: Munich Tigers)
- 1982: Munich Tigers
- 1983: Munich Tigers
- 1984: Bielefeld Peanuts
- 1985: Bielefeld Peanuts
- 1986: Bielefeld Peanuts
- 1987: Bielefeld Peanuts
- 1988: Bielefeld Peanuts
- 1989: Bielefeld Peanuts
- 1990: Bielefeld Peanuts
- 1991: Bielefeld Peanuts
- 1992: Bielefeld Peanuts
- 1993: Bielefeld Peanuts
- 1994: Bielefeld Peanuts
- 1995: Hamburg Knights
- 1996: Mannheim Tornados
- 1997: Mannheim Tornados
- 1998: Mannheim Tornados
- 1999: Mannheim Tornados
- 2000: Mannheim Tornados
- 2001: Brauweiler Raging Abbots
- 2002: Brauweiler Raging Abbots
- 2003:Mannheim Tornados
- 2004: Freising Grizzlies
- 2005: Hamburg Knights
- 2006: Mannheim Tornados
- 2007: Mannheim Tornados
- 2008: Hamburg Knights
- 2009: Mannheim Tornados
- 2010: Wesseling Vermins
- 2011: Mannheim Tornados
- 2012: Wesseling Vermins
- 2013: Wesseling Vermins
- 2014: Wesseling Vermins
- 2015: Wesseling Vermins
- 2016: Mannheim Tornados
- 2017: Mannheim Tornados
- 2018: Wesseling Vermins
- 2019: Wesseling Vermins
- 2020: Wesseling Vermins
- 2021: Wesseling Vermins
- 2022: Bonn Capitals

== Junior German Champions ==
- 1985: Mannheim Tornados
- 1986: Mannheim Tornados
- 1987: Zülpich Eagles
- 1988: Zülpich Eagles
- 1989: Zülpich Eagles
- 1990: St. Pauli Knights
- 1991: Düsseldorf Senators
- 1992: Düsseldorf Senators
- 1993: Düsseldorf Senators
- 1994: Holzwickede Joboxers
- 1995: Bonn Capitals
- 1996: Mainz Athletics
- 1997: Mainz Athletics
- 1998: Mannheim Tornados
- 1999: Bonn Capitals
- 2000: Mainz Athletics
- 2001: Mainz Athletics
- 2002: Mainz Athletics
- 2003: Paderborn Untouchables
- 2004: Heidenheim Heideköpfe
- 2005: Paderborn Untouchables
- 2006: Paderborn Untouchables
- 2007: Paderborn Untouchables
- 2008: Bonn Capitals
- 2009: Mainz Athletics
- 2010: Dohren Wild Farmers
- 2011: Mannheim Tornados
- 2012: Mannheim Tornados
- 2013: Regensburg Legionäre
- 2014: Regensburg Legionäre
- 2015: Regensburg Legionäre
- 2016: Regensburg Legionäre
- 2017: Paderborn Untouchables
- 2018: Paderborn Untouchables
- 2019: Regensburg Legionäre
- 2021: Regensburg Legionäre
- 2022: Regensburg Legionäre

== Junior Girl's German Champions (softball) ==
- 2006: Wesseling Vermins
- 2007: Wesseling Vermins
- 2008: Neunkirchen Nightmares
- 2009: Karlsruhe Cougars
- 2010: Wesseling Vermins
- 2011: Wesseling Vermins
- 2012: Wesseling Vermins
- 2013: Mannheim Tornados
- 2014: Freising Grizzlies
- 2015: Freising Grizzlies
- 2016: Wesseling Vermins
- 2017: Freising Grizzlies
- 2018: Wesseling Vermins
- 2019: Karlsruhe Cougars
- 2021: Freising Grizzlies
- 2022: Karlsruhe Cougars

== Youth German Champions ==
- 1973: Bad Kreuznach Tigers
- 1974: VfR Mannheim (Cubs)
- 1975 - 1976 No Champion
- 1977: Mannheim Tornados
- 1978: Mannheim Tornados
- 1979: Mannheim Tornados
- 1980: Mannheim Tornados
- 1981: Mannheim Tornados
- 1982: Zülpich Eagles
- 1983: Mannheim Amigos
- 1984: Mannheim Tornados
- 1985: Mannheim Tornados
- 1986: Mannheim Tornados
- 1987: Zülpich Eagles
- 1988 - 1989 unknown
- 1990: Brauweiler Raging Abbots
- 1991: Mannheim Amigos
- 1992: Mannheim Amigos
- 1993: Mannheim Amigos
- 1994: Kassel Herkules
- 1995: Darmstadt Whippets
- 1996: Mainz Athletics
- 1997: Bonn Capitals
- 1998: Gauting Indians
- 1999: Herrenberg Wanderers
- 2000: Ladenburg Romans
- 2001: Mannheim Amigos
- 2002: Paderborn Untouchables
- 2003: Mainz Athletics
- 2004: Paderborn Untouchables
- 2005: Bonn Capitals
- 2006: Bonn Capitals
- 2007: Erbach Grasshoppers
- 2008: Mannheim Tornados
- 2009: Mainz Athletics
- 2010: Bonn Capitals
- 2011: HSV Stealers
- 2012: Stuttgart Reds
- 2013: Paderborn Untouchables
- 2014: Solingen Alligators
- 2015: Bad Homburg Hornets
- 2016: Mainz Athletics
- 2017: Regensburg Legionäre
- 2018: Stuttgart Reds
- 2019: Bonn Capitals
- 2021: Regensburg Legionäre
- 2022: Regensburg Legionäre

== Youth Girl's German Champions (softball) ==
- 2018: Freising Grizzlies
- 2019: Karlsruhe Cougars / Stuttgart Reds
- 2021: Freising Grizzlies
- 2022: Karlsruhe Cougars / Stuttgart Reds

== Students Champions ==
- 1973: VfR Mannheim (Pumas)
- 1974: Bad Kreuznach Tigers
- 1975: no champion
- 1976: no champion
- 1977: Mannheim Tornados
- 1978: Mannheim Tornados
- 1979: Mannheim Tornados
- 1980: Mannheim Tornados
- 1981: unknown
- 1982: Mannheim Tornados
- 1983: Darmstadt-Messel Devils
- 1984: Zülpich Eagles
- 1985: Zülpich Eagles
- 1986: unknown
- 1987: unknown
- 1988: unknown
- 1989: Brauweiler Raging Abbots
- 1990: Mannheim Amigos
- 1991: unknown
- 1992: unknown
- 1993: Mainz Athletics
- 1994: Mainz Athletics
- 1995: Mainz Athletics
- 1996: Mainz Athletics
- 1997: Taunus Eagles
- 1998: Schwetzingen Braves
- 1999: Mainz Athletics
- 2000: Neu-Anspach Eagles
- 2001: Lüneburg Woodlarks
- 2002: Mainz Athletics
- 2003: Bonn Capitals
- 2004: Solingen Alligators
- 2005: Bonn Capitals
- 2006: Mannheim Tornados
- 2007: Mannheim Tornados
- 2008: Heidelberg Hedgehogs
- 2009: Paderborn Untouchables
- 2010: Stuttgart Reds
- 2011: Solingen Alligators
- 2012: Dreieich Vultures
- 2013: Regensburg Legionäre
- 2014: Regensburg Legionäre
- 2015: Regensburg Legionäre
- 2016: Stuttgart Reds
- 2017: Stuttgart Reds
- 2018: Stuttgart Reds
- 2019: Bonn Capitals
- 2021: Stuttgart Reds
- 2022: Berlin Flamingos

== Men's Cup Winners (DBV-Pokal) ==
- 1993: Mainz Athletics
- 1994: Mannheim Tornados
- 1995: Mannheim Tornados
- 1996: Bonn Capitals
- 1997: Regensburg Legionäre
- 1998: Paderborn Untouchables
- 1999: Paderborn Untouchables
- 2000: Lokstedt Stealers
- 2001: Köln Dodgers
- 2002: Regensburg Legionäre
- 2003: Regensburg Legionäre
- 2004: Regensburg Legionäre
- 2005: Regensburg Legionäre
- 2006: Regensburg Legionäre

== Women's Cup Winners (DBV-Pokal) ==
- 1996: Mannheim Tornados
- 1997: Mannheim Tornados
- 1998: Mannheim Tornados
- 1999: Mannheim Tornados
- 2000: Mannheim Tornados
- 2001: Mannheim Tornados
- 2002: Brauweiler Raging Abbots
- 2003: Brauweiler Raging Abbots
- 2004: Hamburg Knights
- 2005: Mannheim Tornados
- 2006: Hamburg Knights

== Women's Cup Winners (Deutschlandpokal) ==
- 2012: Neunkirchen Nightmares
- 2013: Neunkirchen Nightmares
- 2014: Neunkirchen Nightmares
- 2015: Mannheim Tornados
- 2016: Wesseling Vermins
- 2017: Wesseling Vermins
- 2018: Neunkirchen Nightmares
- 2019: Hamburg Knights
- 2020: Neunkirchen Nightmares
- 2021: Bonn Capitals

== See also ==
- Baseball awards § Germany
- Baseball awards § Europe
