= Mike Bolsenbroek =

Dutch baseball player (born 1987)

Heidenheim Heideköpfe – No. 11
- Pitcher
- Born: March 11, 1987 (age 39); Apeldoorn, Netherlands
- Bats: Right Throws: Right
- Stats at Baseball Reference
Medals
Men's baseball
Representing Netherlands
European Baseball Championship
| Gold medal – first place | 2014 Brno | Team |
| Gold medal – first place | 2016 Hoofddorp | Team |
| Gold medal – first place | 2019 Bonn | Team |
| Gold medal – first place | 2021 Turin | Team |

Mike Bolsenbroek (born March 11, 1987) is a Dutch professional baseball pitcher for Heidenheim Heideköpfe of the Baseball-Bundesliga. He has pitched for the Netherlands national team in two World Baseball Classics and other international tournaments. He threw a seven-inning perfect game against Greece in 2014. He pitched in Minor League Baseball from 2008 to 2010.

== Career ==
Bolsenbroek attended El Modena High School in Orange, California, then played college baseball at Santa Ana College. The Chicago White Sox selected him in the 2006 and 2007 Major League Baseball (MLB) drafts before the Philadelphia Phillies selected him in the 42nd round of the 2008 draft. He later said that the White Sox never offered him a contract after the 2007 draft. He played in the Phillies minor league system from 2008 to 2010.

While an amateur in the U.S., Bolsenbroek played for HCAW in the Dutch Honkbal Hoofdklasse in 2005. He pitched for Regensburg Legionäre beginning in 2008, winning Bundesliga championships that year and in 2010 before rejoining the team after he was renewed by Philadelphia. He was one of the league's best pitchers from 2011 to 2015. He had a one-hit, 18-strikeout playoff performance against Solingen Alligators in 2015. He joined Heidenheim Heideköpfe in 2019.

Bolsenbroek pitched for the Germany national team in the 2013 World Baseball Classic qualifiers in 2012, earning a win over the Czech Republic.

Bolsenbroek pitched for the Netherlands national team for the 2017 and 2023 World Baseball Classics. He joined the Dutch national team in July 2014. That September, he threw a 7-inning perfect game against Greece in the European Baseball Championship. He played for the Netherlands in the 2019 European Baseball Championship and the Africa/Europe 2020 Olympic Qualification tournament in 2019.
