= Cologne Cardinals =

- Cologne Cardinals Sports-Club e.V.

Information
- League: Baseball (men): Deutsche Baseball Liga (DBL) North; 2nd Bundesliga Northwest; Verbandsliga NRW; Landesliga NRW; Bezirksliga Rhineland; Softball (women, mixed): 1st Bundesliga; Verbandsliga NRW; Landesliga NRW; Ruhr-Fun-Liga (RFL) Mixed Fastpitch; BBQ-Liga Mixed
- Location: Cologne, North Rhine-Westphalia (NRW)
- Ballpark: Circlewood stadium; Biesterfield stadium
- Founded: 1983
- Nickname: Cards
- League championships: 1 (1990)
- Colors: red, white & blue
- President: Georg Apfelbaum
- Coach: Alex Braham
- Website: www.colognecardinals.de

The Cologne Cardinals are a German baseball and softball team based in Cologne, North Rhine-Westphalia. The team is organized as a registered sports association under German law and has the support of a large number of volunteers. Founded in 1983, the team plays their home games at Circlewood Stadium in the Müngersdorf sports park, in the proximity of Cologne's soccer facilities.

The Cardinals compete in the German Baseball-Bundesliga, which was rebranded as the Deutsche Baseball Liga (DBL) for marketing purposes at the beginning of the 2025 season. The team won one championship title in 1990. Since the relegation of the Mannheim Tornados, the Cologne Cardinals are the last remaining founding member of the Deutsche Baseball Liga.

== Baseball (men) ==
The Cologne Cardinals were established following a division from the Cologne Dodgers in 1984. The Cardinals used to play in the South Division, but were moved to the North Division when the league expanded to eight teams per division in 1993. After winning the German baseball championship in 1990, the team experienced two relegations in 1996 and 2010. However, the Cardinals have maintained their position in the top division without interruption since 2011. In 2024, the Cologne Cardinals qualified for the playoffs for the first time since their relegation, but were ultimatively defeated in the quarterfinals by the Regensburg Legionäre. With a 10–14 win-loss record and a .417 winning percentage in the 2025 season, the team was unable to build on its success from the previous season and finished fourth place.

In addition to the DBL-team, the Cardinals are currently represented in the 2nd Bundesliga Northwest and the Verbandsliga NRW. With the promotion of the fourth team to the Landesliga NRW in 2024, a fifth team was formed to compete in the Bezirksliga Rhineland for the 2025 season.

== Softball (women, mixed) ==
In the early 2000s, the Cologne Cardinals softball team was a regular contender for the German softball championship. After the team was relegated following the season in 2008, it returned to the softball Bundesliga in 2022. With a 15–13 win-loss record and a .536 winning percentage, the softball team finished third in their division in the 2025 season. After qualifying for the playoffs, they defeated the Freising Grizzlies in the quarterfinals, reaching the softball Bundesliga semifinals for the first time in 20 years. However, the Cardinals were unable to compete against a strong Bonn Capitals team in the semifinals.

A second women's team competes in the Verbandsliga NRW. Since the 2026 season, the club has been working towards establishing a Landesliga team.

In addition to the women's softball program, the MixedCards team participates in a self-contained fastpitch softball league. The Ruhr-Fun-Liga (RFL) is open to all players, regardless of their skill level. The team with the best record qualifies for the German Mixed Softball Champions League in the following year. To provide newcomers and rookies with the necessary playing experience, the FunCards team was formed at the beginning of the 2026 season. The FunCards participate in the BBQ-Liga NRW, which uses simplified rules.

== Ballparks ==
Since their foundation in 1983, the Cardinal's home ballpark has been a former equestrian venue in the Müngersdorf sports park. In 1997, the facility was converted into a baseball stadium with a 312 feet right field to meet North American Major League standards. Additionally, the facility features a softball field and adjacent training facilities. For the 2001 European Baseball Championships in Cologne, Bonn, and Solingen, the Circlewood Stadium had a capacity of approximately 1,000 spectators. Beyond the Circlewood Stadium, a second ballpark is situated at the sports park on Biesterfeldstraße in the northwestern region of Cologne, which is primarily utilized by the softball teams.
