= Hamburg Stealers =

German professional baseball team

- Logo

Information
- League: Deutsche Baseball Liga (Nord)
- Location: Hamburg
- Ballpark: Ballpark Langenhorst
- Founded: 1985
- League championships: 1 (2000)
- Division championships: 4 (1993, 1994, 1995, 1996)
- Colours: Blue, red and white
- Manager: David Wohlgemuth
- Website: www.stealers.de

Current uniforms
Home	Away

Baseballclub Hamburg Stealers e.V., commonly referred to as Hamburg Stealers, is a German baseball team based in Hamburg. The Stealers compete in the Deutsche Baseball Liga in the north division. Established in 1985, the team won the Baseball-Bundesliga once in 2000. The Stealers play their home games at Ballpark Langenhorst.

== History ==
The Hamburg Stealers were founded in 1985 as the Lokstedt Stealers and participated for the first time in the Baseball-Bundesliga in 1991. In 1994, the team reached the final for the first time but lost against the Mannheim Tornados. In 1996, the Stealers almost had a perfect season, finishing with a 27–1 record; in the playoffs, the team lost in the semi-finals to Mannheim.

In 2000, the club had its best season. The Stealers won its first German championship after finishing the season with a 23–11 record and going undefeated in the playoffs, defeating the Mainz Athletics in the semi-finals and the Cologne Dodgers in the final. That same year, the club won the German Cup and the Pool B of the CEB European Cup.

In 2006, the Stealers joined with Hamburger SV and changed its name from Lokstedt Stealers to HSV Stealers. However, in November 2014, the Stealers split from Hamburger and formed a separate club: Baseballclub Hamburg Stealers e. V.

In December 2022 the Stealers signed Japanese pitcher Yasutomo Kubo ahead of the 2023 season. Kubo previously played in Japan for the Chiba Lotte Marines, Hanshin Tigers and Yokohama DeNA BayStars and had a brief stint in the Atlantic League of Professional Baseball and the Mexican Baseball League.

== Ballpark ==
Ballpark Langenhorst is located in the Niendorf quarter of Hamburg, next to the FC St. Pauli training facilities. The ballpark has a capacity of 1,200 spectators, including 500 seats.

Since 2014, the ballpark has a clubhouse with two changing rooms, an umpires' changing room, terrace, a kitchen, a training room and several offices.

== Roster ==
Hamburg Stealers roster
Players		Coaches
Pitchers: 51 (Hungary) Sean Fekete; 35 (Germany) Tommy Ihde; 10 (France) Quentin Moulin; 69 (Germany) Maximilian Müller; 22 (Germany) Joshua Spezia; 18 (Germany) Marc Wanke	Catchers: 5 (Germany) Fynn Ihde; 11 (Venezuela) Isaías Lucena; Infielders: 96 (United Kingdom) Michael Flaherty; 24 (Germany) Marc Harder; 16 (Germany) Marvin Kilic; 73 (Germany) Nadir Ljatifi; 63 (Germany) Laurin Marin; 14 (United States) Brehan Murphy; 4 (Germany) Darrion Richards; 37 (Germany) Hendrik Scholz; 13 (Germany) Malo Zimmermann; Outfielders: 8 (Switzerland) Livio Bundi; 15 (Germany) Robert Dröge; 26 (Germany) Maik Ehmcke; 55 (Germany) Sebastian Koch; 29 (Germany) Anthony Rodriguez Klinzing	Manager: 96 (Germany) David Wohlgemuth; Coaches: 24 (Germany) Michael Kujoth (coach); Roster updated on 13 September 2025
