= Berlin Sluggers =

Information
- League: Baseball-Bundesliga (Bundesliga Nord)
- Location: Berlin
- Ballpark: Paul Rusch Stadium
- Founded: 1985
- Colors: red/dark blue/white
- General manager: Uwe Münchow
- Website: berlinsluggers.de

The Berlin Sluggers, officially named "Sluggers eV Berlin", is a baseball club founded on October 1, 1985 in Berlin, Germany, making it the oldest baseball club in Berlin. The first men's team played a few seasons in the first division of the German Baseball Bundesliga in the early nineties and was promoted again for the 2011 season. However, though the team qualified to advance to the first division in 2006, it was unable to do so due to financial constraints.

The Sluggers play their home games at Paul Rusch Stadium in the Buckow neighborhood of Berlin. It is the only baseball-only field in Berlin. Max Kepler-Rozycki, who signed with the Minnesota Twins in 2009 for a signing bonus of $750,000, the standing record for a European player, is a former Slugger.

== Club structure ==
The full club consists of 6 teams:

- 1st Men's Baseball (Sluggers I), Bundesliga's 2nd Division
- 2nd Men's Baseball (Sluggers II), Regional League, North East Division
- 3rd Men's Baseball (Sluggers III), Bezirksliga Berlin
- Junior (15–18 years old), Junior League
- Youth (13–15 years old), Youth League
- Students (7–12 years old), Berlin League

Additionally, the club is developing a team for children 4 to 7 years old, which it dubs the "Mini Sluggers." The club claims 85 members as of 2010 and charges a membership fee of €48 for members under 18 and €57 for members over 18 years of age.
