= Haar Disciples =

Munich-Haar Disciples

Information
- League: 1. Baseball Bundesliga (Süd), Euro League Baseball
- Location: Haar, Bavaria
- Ballpark: Ballpark Eglfing
- Founded: 1990
- Colors: purple / yellow
- Ownership: Todd Covell
- Website: bundesliga.disciples.de

The München-Haar Disciples (German pronunciation: [ˌmʏnçn̩ˈhaːɐ̯ dɪˌsaɪpl̩s]), officially named "Disciples München-Haar e.V. von 1990", is a baseball club founded in 1990 in Haar, a suburb of Munich. The first men's team plays in the German Baseball Bundesliga. The first women's team plays in the first softball league.

When the team was first registered with the German Baseball Association (Deutscher Baseball & Softball Verband d.V.) in 1991, the name was misspelled "Haar Desciples eV."

== Club structure ==
The full club consists of 14 teams:

- 1st Men's Baseball, 1. Bundesliga
- 2nd Men's Baseball, Regionalliga
- 3rd Men's Baseball, Bayernliga
- 1st Women's Softball, Bayernliga
- 2nd Women's Softball, Landesliga
- Juniors U18
- Youth U15
- Youth Women's Softball U16
- Kids Women's Softball U13
- Kids Live Pitch U12
- Kids Coach Pitch Baseball U9

== Season by season performance (1st Bundesliga) ==
Year	Rank	Games	W	L	Win%	Season Notes
2008	6	28	10	18	.357	
2009	5	24	8	16	.333	
2010	4	28	15	13	.535	Lost in Quarterfinals to the Solingen Alligators, 0-3
2011	4	24	13	11	.542	Lost in Quarterfinals to the Paderborn Untouchables, 1–3
2012	4	24	16	8	.667	Lost in Quarterfinals to the Paderborn Untouchables, 1–3
2013	4	28	16	12	.571	Lost in Quarterfinals to the Solingen Alligators, 1-3
2014	4	28	19	9	.679	Lost in Quarterfinals to the Solingen Alligators, 1-3
2015	3	28	18	10	.643	Lost in Quarterfinals to the Solingen Alligators, 1-3

== Euro League Baseball ==
The Haar Disciples were one of the three teams to participate in the inaugural season of the Euro League Baseball.

2016 Euro League Baseball standings
Pos	Team	Pld	HW	HL	AW	AL	GB	PCT
1	Draci Brno	8	2	2	4	0	—	.750
2	Regensburg Legionäre	8	2	2	1	3	3	.375
3	Munich-Haar Disciples	8	2	2	1	3	3	.375
