= Yasutomo Kubo =

Japanese baseball player (born 1980)

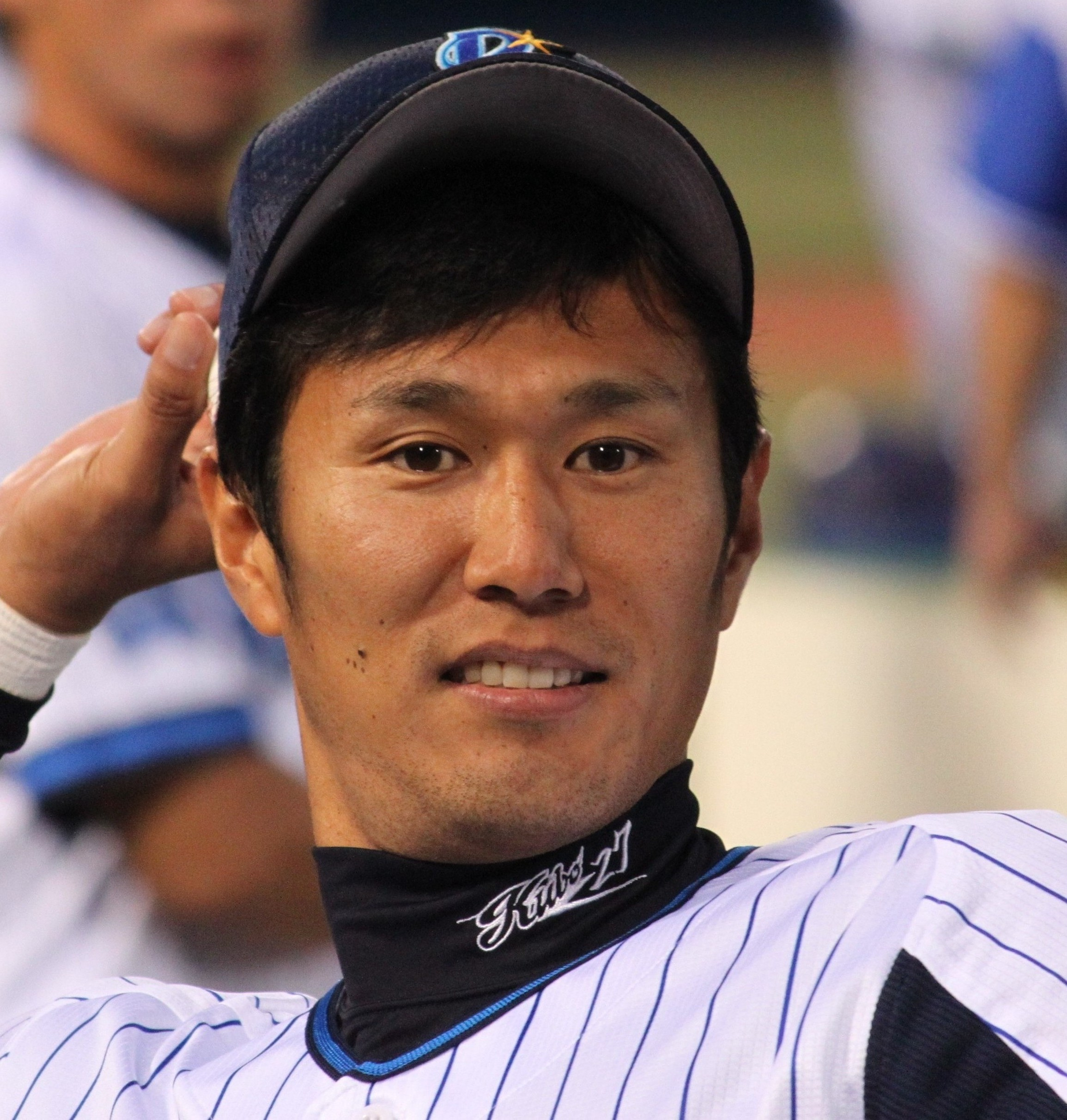
- Kubo with the Yokohama DeNA BayStars

Hyogo Bravers – No. 15
- Pitcher
- Born: August 6, 1980 (age 45); Kashihara, Nara, Japan
- Bats: Right Throws: Right

NPB debut
- April 2, 2005, for the Chiba Lotte Marines

NPB statistics (through 2017 season)
- Win–loss record: 97-86
- ERA: 3.70
- Strikeouts: 1130
- Stats at Baseball Reference

Teams
- Chiba Lotte Marines (2005–2008); Hanshin Tigers (2009–2013); Yokohama DeNA BayStars (2014–2017)

Career highlights and awards
- Pacific League Rookie of the Year (2005); NPB All-Star (2010)

Yasutomo Kubo (久保 康友, born August 6, 1980) is a Japanese professional baseball pitcher for the Hyogo Bravers of the Sawakami Kansai Independent League. He has previously played in Nippon Professional Baseball (NPB) for the Chiba Lotte Marines from 2005 to 2008, the Hanshin Tigers from 2009 to 2013, and the Yokohama DeNA BayStars from 2014 to 2017.

== Career ==
=== Chiba Lotte Marines ===
Kubo began his professional career with the Chiba Lotte Marines of Nippon Professional Baseball. He made his NPB debut on April 2, 2005. Kubo then went on to play for the Marines through the 2008 season.

=== Hanshin Tigers ===
In 2009, Kubo joined the Hanshin Tigers of NPB. He played for the team in the 2009, 2010, 2011, 2012, and 2013 seasons before becoming a free agent after 2013.

=== Yokohama DeNA BayStars ===
Kubo joined the Yokohama DeNA BayStars of NPB for the 2014 season. He played for the team through the 2017 season before becoming a free agent at the end of the year.

=== Gary SouthShore RailCats ===
On April 19, 2018, Kubo signed with the Gary SouthShore RailCats of the American Association of Independent Professional Baseball. He was released by Gary on May 11, but re-signed on June 28. In 3 games with Gary, Kubo recorded a 4.05 ERA with 4 strikeouts in 6 2/3 innings.

=== Sugar Land Skeeters ===
On July 13, 2018, Kubo was traded to the Sugar Land Skeeters of the Atlantic League of Professional Baseball. He finished the year with the Skeeters, pitching in 13 games and posting a 5–2 record and 5.14 ERA. He became a free agent after the season.

=== Bravos de León ===
On April 3, 2019, Kubo signed with the Bravos de León of the Mexican League. He spent the 2019 season with the club and logged an 8-14 record and 5.98 ERA while leading the league with 154 strikeouts. Kubo was released on January 13, 2020.

=== Hamburg Stealers ===
On December 25, 2022, Kubo signed with the Hamburg Stealers of the German Baseball Bundesliga for the 2023 season. Kubo finished the season with 122 innings pitched, 104 strikeouts and an ERA of 1.62, leading the Bundesliga Nord in the former two stats, and ERA with a minimum of 35 innings pitched, winning the Best Pitcher Award of the Bundesliga Nord.

=== Hyogo Bravers ===
On March 17, 2025, Kubo signed with the Hyogo Bravers of the Sawakami Kansai Independent League in Japan.
