= German Baseball and Softball Federation =

German national sports governing body

- Sport: Baseball
- Jurisdiction: Germany
- Abbreviation: DBV
- Founded: 1950
- Affiliation: WBSC
- Regional affiliation: WBSC Europe
- Headquarters: Frankfurt, Germany
- President: Jürgen Elsishans

Official website
- www.baseball-softball.de
- (Germany)

The German Baseball and Softball Federation (DBV) (German: Deutscher Baseball Softball Verband) is the national governing body of baseball and softball in Germany. The federation was established in 1955 as the Amateur Baseball Federation Germany and changed its name to the current in 1980.

The German Baseball and Softball Federation is responsible for the Germany national baseball team and the Germany women's national softball team, as well as their youth teams, and overseeing the Baseball-Bundesliga, the top baseball competition in Germany.

== History ==
The German Baseball and Softball Federation was established on 5 December 1950 as the Amateur Baseball Federation Germany (Amateur Baseball Föderation Deutschland) and was mainly in charge of organizing the German baseball championship, that had its first season in 1951.

In April 1953, Germany was one of the founding members of the Confederation of European Baseball (now WBSC Europe), alongside Belgium, France, Italy, and Spain. Delegates from each one of the countries met in Paris and established the Fédération Européenne de Baseball (European Baseball Federation).

After a period of decline in the popularity of baseball in the 1970s, that saw the German championship interrupted for eleven years, the federation was renamed to German Baseball and Softball Federation in 1980, when the sport regained strength in Germany.

Jürgen Elsishans is the current president of the German Baseball and Softball Federation, who has held the position since 2019.

== Teams ==
The German Baseball and Softball Federation oversees the development of the following national baseball and softball teams:

Baseball

- Germany national baseball team
- Germany national under-23 baseball team
- Germany national under-18 baseball team
- Germany national under-15 baseball team
- Germany national under-12 baseball team

Softball

- Germany women's national softball team
- Germany women's national under-22 baseball team
- Germany women's national under-18 baseball team
- Germany women's national under-15 baseball team
- Germany women's national under-13 baseball team

== German Baseball Hall of Fame ==
In 1994, the DBV created the German Baseball Hall of Fame that honors players, coaches and officials who have made significant contributions to baseball and softball in Germany.
