= Baseball in Germany =

Baseball in Germany started in 1936, with the first official baseball game being played at the 1936 Olympics. After World War II, baseball was popularized by American soldiers who were stationed in Germany. Today, baseball is a minor sport in Germany, although the country is still home to one of Europe's biggest baseball communities, with around 30,000 active players. The national governing body is the Deutscher Baseball und Softball Verband (German Baseball and Softball Federation), and the highest baseball league is the 1. Baseball Bundesliga. Max Kepler is currently the only German-developed player in Major League Baseball.

== History ==
=== Before World War II ===
The first mention of baseball in Germany was found in a 1796 book on sports by German writer Johann Christoph Friedrich GutsMuths, where he was writing about a game called schlagbal, a very old German-Austrian game. Although Germans were exposed to bat-and-ball games from an early stage, baseball did not rise in popularity until after World War II. During the late nineteenth and early twentieth century, a lot of European countries received interest from major league players, one of which was Hall of Fame member John McGraw. From 1888 to 1889, A.G. Spalding went on a Major League Baseball world tour where he visited Italy, France and the United Kingdom, but not Germany since Berlin was covered in snow that winter. In 1912-1913, John McGraw and Charlie Comiskey went on another world tour, but again Germany, because of the threat of inclement weather during the tour, was left off the schedule. This likely was a reason why baseball was left more undeveloped than in other European countries like Italy or the Netherlands.

During World War I, American soldiers played baseball in Germany but the first official game on German grounds took place in Berlin at the 1936 Olympics. The sport was introduced in a demonstration tournament where the United States was planned to play against other nations, including Japan. The ongoing economic depression caused other nations to cancel their arrangements for the tournament, leaving the Americans to play a split-squad exhibition game in front of the German audience on the last day of the Olympics. On August 12, 1936, the World Amateurs and the U.S. Olympics played at the Olympiastadion in front of 92,565 spectators. The stadium was not designed to accommodate baseball, leaving lights only 50 feet (15 m) into the air and Adolf Hitler's box in the right field fair territory. The World Amateurs won the game 6–5 in 7 innings on a walkoff-inside-the-park-homerun by Les McNeece.

After the game, the players were congratulated and praised by Dr. Carl Diem, the secretary of the German Organization Committee. "I have come officially to advise you that this has been the finest demonstration of any sport that any nation has ever put on at any Olympic Games," Diem said. After this event there were multiple teams that appeared around Berlin and even in southern Germany. When the war started though, the "American pastime" was no longer welcomed, and there was no more baseball played by Germans until after the war.

=== During World War II ===
During World War II, baseball was played in many POW camps by American GIs, although it was mostly softball. There was difficulty obtaining equipment, and games were often played with modified rules. Baseball was seen as a morale-booster for POWs, and was played in almost every camp housing Americans; hundreds of teams played in organized leagues. As the war came to an end, baseball began to be played outside of POW camps. Several professional Major League and Negro league players took part in those military competitions, including Hall of Famers Warren Spahn and Leon Day, as well as six-time All-Star Ewell Blackwell. The games were mainly played for military personnel, and as a result had little impact on the native Germans.

=== 1945–1980 ===
After World War II, Germany was divided into four occupation zones, one of which was controlled by the United States. One of their goals was to expose the German youth to the "American way of life". In order to do that they created the GYA (German Youth Activities), where they used baseball, basketball and American football (as well as already-popular sports like boxing, athletics and gymnastics) to teach them American values. In the years following the war, baseball flourished in certain parts of Germany, mainly in Berlin and in the south around cities like Mannheim, Ramstein, Stuttgart, Nuremberg and Munich. In the non-U.S. zones of Germany, baseball remained unknown. By 1948, there were 140 teams around Germany, and in 1949 the Frankfurt Juniors, the first German baseball club was founded. The Allgemeine Baseball-Foederation Deutschland (ABFD) was formed in 1950, and the first German championship tournament was held the following year. By 1954, there were several other European countries playing baseball, and Germany became one of the five founding members of the Confederation Europenne de Baseball Amateur. Germany played at the inaugural European Baseball Championship in 1954 where they placed fourth and last.

In the mid-1950s, many American troops returned to the United States, which had a negative impact on the popularity of baseball in Germany. The next generation were not exposed to the game, and many American coaches returned home. In the 1970s, Germany traveled to Managua, Nicaragua, twice to compete in the Baseball World Cup, but they failed to win a single game, placing last in both tournaments. In 1970, the ABFD was disbanded, and between 1969 and 1981 there was no national champion crowned. By 1979, there was only one club left, the Mannheim Tornados.

=== 1980 to now ===
In 1980, a process to rebuild baseball in Germany began. That year, the German baseball community officially registered the Deutscher Baseball und Softball Verband (DBV) as the governing body with German authorities. The 1. Baseball Bundesliga was reformed in 1982 and is still active. The number of active players has grown from less than 2,000 in 1989 to almost 30,000 players today.

The 1. Baseball Bundesliga is one of the most competitive leagues in Europe, just below the Honkbal Hoofdklasse in the Netherlands and the Italian Baseball League. However, the Germans have not had a first or second place finish at the European Championship since the inaugural tournament in 1954. There have still been several German players that were able to sign with MLB clubs in the past 18 years, with Max Kepler and Donald Lutz being the two players to have played professionally at the highest level in the United States. It has been suggested that Kepler's success in particular could have an enormous impact on the popularity of baseball in Germany, as a role model for children. Since 2017, MLB games have been broadcast on German television, with the channels SPORT1, SPORT1 US and DAZN showing more than 75 games a season.

== Baseball Bundesliga ==
The Baseball Bundesliga, established in 1984, is the highest German baseball league. It is divided into two levels, 1. Bundesliga and 2. Bundesliga, each with two divisions (North and South) containing five to eight teams each. The regular season is played between March and July, followed by a playoff postseason.

The Mannheim Tornados are the only team that has played in the league since its inception. They also, as of 2018, have the most national titles (10), followed by the Paderborn Untouchables (6) and the Buchbinder Legionäre Regensburg (5).

== Germans in MLB ==
=== American-born players with German ancestry ===
German Americans comprise a significant percentage of players in baseball history. Between 1871 and 1875 they made up 30% of players, and between 1900 and 1920 roughly 28% of players were of German heritage. Famous German American players include:

- Levi Meyerle, won the batting title in 1871 with the highest single-season batting average of all-time (.492).
- George Zettlein, who was considered the hardest thrower of the 1870s.
- Addie Joss, Hall of Fame pitcher with the second lowest career ERA (1.89), and no losing season, pitched a perfect game.
- Ed Reulbach, who completed 201 of 300 starts, and had a 2.28 ERA.
- Frank Schulte, who won the first National League MVP award in 1911.
- Rube Waddell, Hall of Famer, 2.13 ERA.
- Honus Wagner, one of the first 5 inductees to the Hall of Fame, .327 career batting average, 8 batting titles, 17 consecutive seasons with a batting average over .300.
- Chuck Klein, Hall of Famer, Triple Crown in 1933.
- Babe Ruth, arguably greatest player in baseball history.
- Lou Gehrig, 2 MVPs, 1 Triple Crown, played in 2130 consecutive games, nicknamed the "iron horse".
- Cal Ripken Jr., 2632 consecutive games, nicknamed the "iron man", 3183 hits, 19-time All-Star.

=== German-born players in MLB ===
In total, there have been 44 German-born players who have played in Major League Baseball. Of those, 25 played in the Majors before 1933, and 11 players played between 1933 and 1999. During the latter time period, only one German-born player appeared in a Major League All-Star Game, Glenn Hubbard, a former second baseman and later on a first base coach with the Atlanta Braves. Since 2000, eight German-born players have appeared in MLB, one of whom is Edwin Jackson. Jackson was an MLB All-Star in 2009 and threw a no-hitter on June 25, 2010. In 2018, he also tied a Major League Baseball record when he made a pitching appearance for his 13th Major League team, then, in 2019, played with his 14th different team, the Toronto Blue Jays.

=== German-developed players in MLB ===
Brothers Klaus and Jürgen Helmig were the first German-developed players to sign a professional baseball contract. In 1956, after practicing daily and playing alongside military teams for several years, they received an offer from the Baltimore Orioles. The Orioles wanted to use this signing for press exposure, leading to the Helmig brothers receiving media attention upon their arrival in the United States. They were invited to the White House and visited the Annual Baseball Writers' Association dinner where they were special guests. Their baseball careers in the minor leagues did not last long, as they were released by the Orioles after a couple of months. Instead, they started playing for the Baltimore Elite Stars in the Negro leagues. They are credited with being two of the few white players to ever play in the Negro leagues. At the end of the 1956 summer, they returned to Germany, where they continued their baseball careers until 1978. They were elected into the German Baseball Hall of Fame in 2006.

In 2000, Mitch Franke became the first player from the German baseball Bundesliga to sign a professional contract with an MLB organization, the Milwaukee Brewers. He never made it to the top, but he opened the doors for other Germans like pitcher Tim Henkenjohann, who played in the Minnesota Twins organization between 2002 and 2005, and catcher Simon Gühring, a player in the Milwaukee Brewers organization in 2002 and 2003. Since 2007, there have been multiple German-developed players that signed professional contracts. Most of them only played a few seasons with different minor league teams, before returning to Germany. They include:

- Ludwig Glaser, Los Angeles Angels, third baseman, 2008.
- Kai Gronauer, New York Mets, catcher, 2008-2014.
- Markus Solbach, Minnesota Twins; Arizona Diamondbacks, pitcher, 2011-2017.
- Daniel Thieben, Seattle Mariners, pitcher, 2012-2014.
- Maik Ehmcke, Arizona Diamondbacks, outfielder, 2014-2015.
- Julsan Kamara, Philadelphia Phillies, outfielder, 2014-2015.
- Sven Schueller, Los Angeles Dodgers, pitcher, 2014–present.
- Nadir Ljatifi, Cincinnati Reds, infielder, 2015–present.
- Pascal Amon, Los Angeles Dodgers, outfielder and first baseman, 2016-2018.
- Niklas Rimmel, Minnesota Twins, pitcher, 2018–present.

In April 2013, outfielder Donald Lutz became the first German-developed player to play in Major League Baseball when he made his debut for the Cincinnati Reds.

Max Kepler of the Minnesota Twins also trained in his native Germany before being signed by the Twins at age 16, making his major league debut six years later, in 2015. He has since been a consistent force in the Minnesota Twins lineup, hitting 56 homeruns between 2016 and 2018.

== German Baseball Hall of Fame ==
The National Baseball Hall of Fame and Museum is a key component of America's national pastime, which is why the German Baseball and Softball Federation launched the German Baseball Hall of Fame in 1994. It honors those people who have excelled as players, managers, or officials and who have been vital to the development of German baseball. To this date, the German Baseball Hall of Fame has 19 members.
