= Neuenburg Atomics =

Baseball club in Neuenberg am Rhein, Germany

Atomics

Information
- League: 2. Baseball-Bundesliga (Süd)
- Location: Neuenburg am Rhein
- Ballpark: Atomics Baseball-Park
- Founded: 1995
- Colors: navy / white
- Retired numbers: 7,10
- Website: www.atomics-baseball.de/home/

The Neuenburg Atomics are a baseball club located in Neuenburg am Rhein, Baden-Württemberg, Germany. It was founded in 1995 as a subdivision of the soccer club FC Neuenburg. In December 1997, the Atomics became an independent club. Currently there are 7 active teams that are playing in different leagues in Germany. Their highest-ranked team plays in the 2. Baseball Bundesliga (Süd), which they won in 2017.

The club has a youth program, which has produced players for the national U12, U15, and U18 teams.
