= Max Kepler =

German baseball player (born 1993)

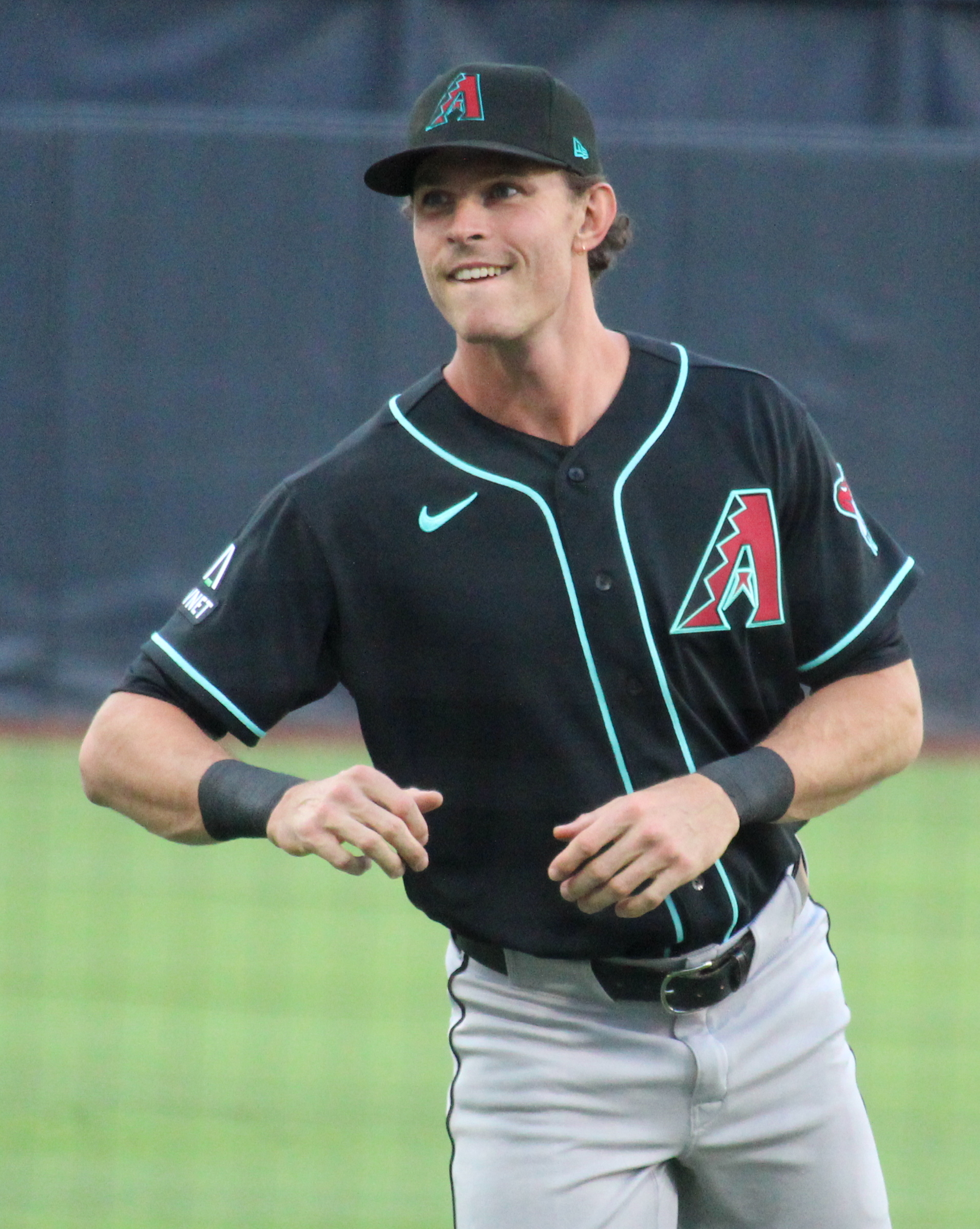
- Kepler with the Arizona Diamondbacks in 2026

Free agent
- Outfielder
- Born: February 10, 1993 (age 33); Berlin, Germany
- Bats: Left Throws: Left

MLB debut
- September 27, 2015, for the Minnesota Twins

MLB statistics (through 2026 season)
- Batting average: .234
- Home runs: 181
- Runs batted in: 575
- Stats at Baseball Reference

Teams
- Minnesota Twins (2015–2024); Philadelphia Phillies (2025); Arizona Diamondbacks (2026)

Maximilian Kepler-Różycki (born February 10, 1993) is a German professional baseball outfielder who is a free agent. He has previously played in Major League Baseball (MLB) for the Minnesota Twins, with whom he made his MLB debut in 2015, Philadelphia Phillies, and Arizona Diamondbacks. Before signing with the Twins, he played for Buchbinder Legionäre Regensburg of the Baseball-Bundesliga. He bats and throws left-handed. He holds the record for home runs hit in a career by a German-born player.

== Early life ==
Kepler was born in Berlin, Germany. His parents, Kathy Kepler and Marek Różycki, were professional ballet dancers; they met when they performed in the same ballet company in Berlin. His mother is from San Antonio, Texas, while his father is from Poland. He has one sister, Emma Różycki, a former golf prodigy.

At the age of six, Kepler started playing baseball at the Little League level with the John F. Kennedy School in Berlin. Though he received a scholarship at age seven to the Steffi Graf Tennis Foundation, he decided to choose baseball. Kepler attended John F. Kennedy School, and the St. Emmeram Academy in Regensburg in 2008, where he was able to train in baseball more than the average American teenager. He played association football with Hertha BSC, and played baseball for Buchbinder Legionäre Regensburg of the Bundesliga, the highest baseball league in Germany.

== Career ==
=== Minnesota Twins ===
==== Minor leagues ====
Andy Johnson, an international scout working for the Minnesota Twins of Major League Baseball (MLB), first noticed Kepler when he played in a junior national tournament at the age of 14. At 16, he signed with the Twins in 2009 for US$800,000, at the time the largest signing bonus given by an MLB franchise to a European-born player. Kepler made his American debut in the rookie level in 2010 Gulf Coast League (GCL) with the GCL Twins. He was promoted to the Elizabethton Twins of the Rookie-Advanced Appalachian League in 2011. He was assigned to Elizabethton for the 2012 season. An elbow injury delayed the start of Kepler's 2013 season, when he was assigned to the Cedar Rapids Kernels of the Single–A Midwest League. Following the regular season, the Twins assigned Kepler to the Glendale Desert Dogs of the Arizona Fall League.

After the 2013 season, the Twins added Kepler to their 40-man roster to protect him from the Rule 5 draft, and he was invited to spring training. Kepler played for the Fort Myers Miracle of the High–A Florida State League in 2014, and opened the 2015 season with the Chattanooga Lookouts of the Double–A Southern League. Kepler was selected to represent the Twins at the 2015 All-Star Futures Game, though a sore left shoulder prevented him from playing. Kepler finished the 2015 season with a .327 batting average, nine home runs, and 18 stolen bases. He was named Southern League Player of the Year.

==== Major leagues ====
The Twins promoted Kepler to the major leagues on September 21, 2015. After Donald Lutz, Kepler is the second German-developed player to play in modern MLB. Kepler made his major league debut on September 27, 2015. He recorded his first hit on October 4, 2015, and for the season he had one single in seven at bats.

==== 2016 season ====
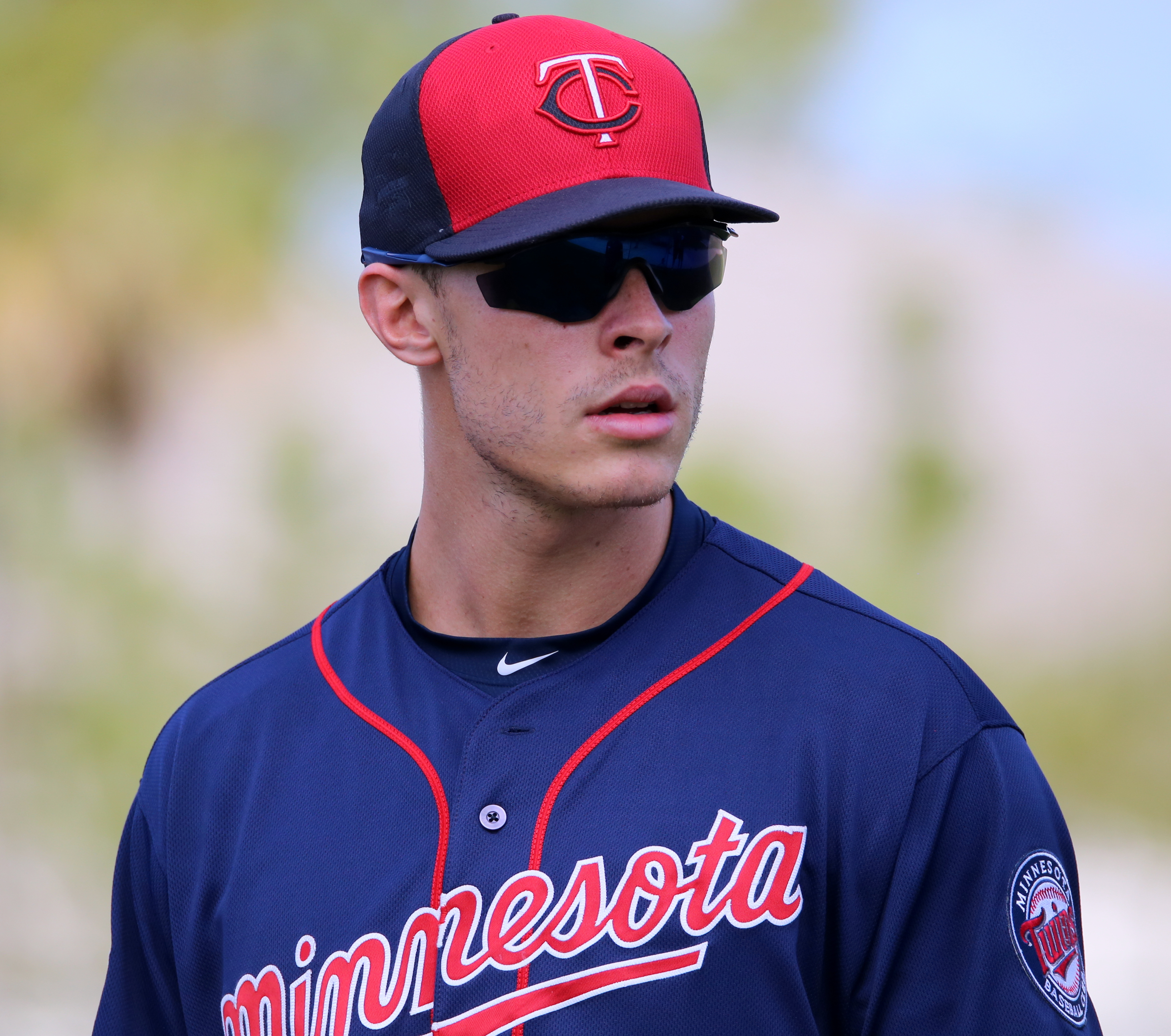
Kepler in 2016

The Twins assigned Kepler to the Rochester Red Wings of the Triple–A International League to start the 2016 season. After playing in two games for Rochester, the Twins promoted him to the major leagues to replace the injured Danny Santana on April 10. Kepler was optioned to Rochester fifteen days later. On June 1, Kepler was recalled to replace the injured Miguel Sanó, and he began getting regular starts for the Twins in right field.

Kepler had his first multi-hit game on June 2 against the Tampa Bay Rays. His first Major League home run was a walk-off blast against Matt Barnes. He became the first European-born Major League player to hit three home runs in a game on August 1 against the Cleveland Indians. This also made him the fifth Twins player to hit three home runs in a game, along with Bob Allison, Harmon Killebrew, Tony Oliva, and Justin Morneau. Kepler was named co-American League Player of the Week on August 8, sharing the honors with Twins teammate Joe Mauer.

He finished the season with a .235 batting average, hitting 17 home runs and driving in 63 runs over 113 games.

==== 2017 season ====
Kepler was an Opening Day starter for the first time in 2017, collecting a hit in his first at-bat of the season against the Kansas City Royals. He became the second player in Twins history to have a walk-off hit by the pitch, doing so in a game against the Chicago White Sox on August 31.

Kepler batted .243 and played in 147 games during the 2017 season. He hit 19 home runs and had 69 RBI, helping the Twins reach the postseason for the first time since 2010. He went 1-for-3 with a double and a walk in the 2017 American League Wild Card Game, but the Twins were defeated by the New York Yankees.

==== 2018 season ====
Kepler hit a walk-off home run against Brad Peacock of the defending champion Houston Astros on April 11, 2018. He finished the season with a batting average of .224 and hit 20 home runs with 58 RBI.

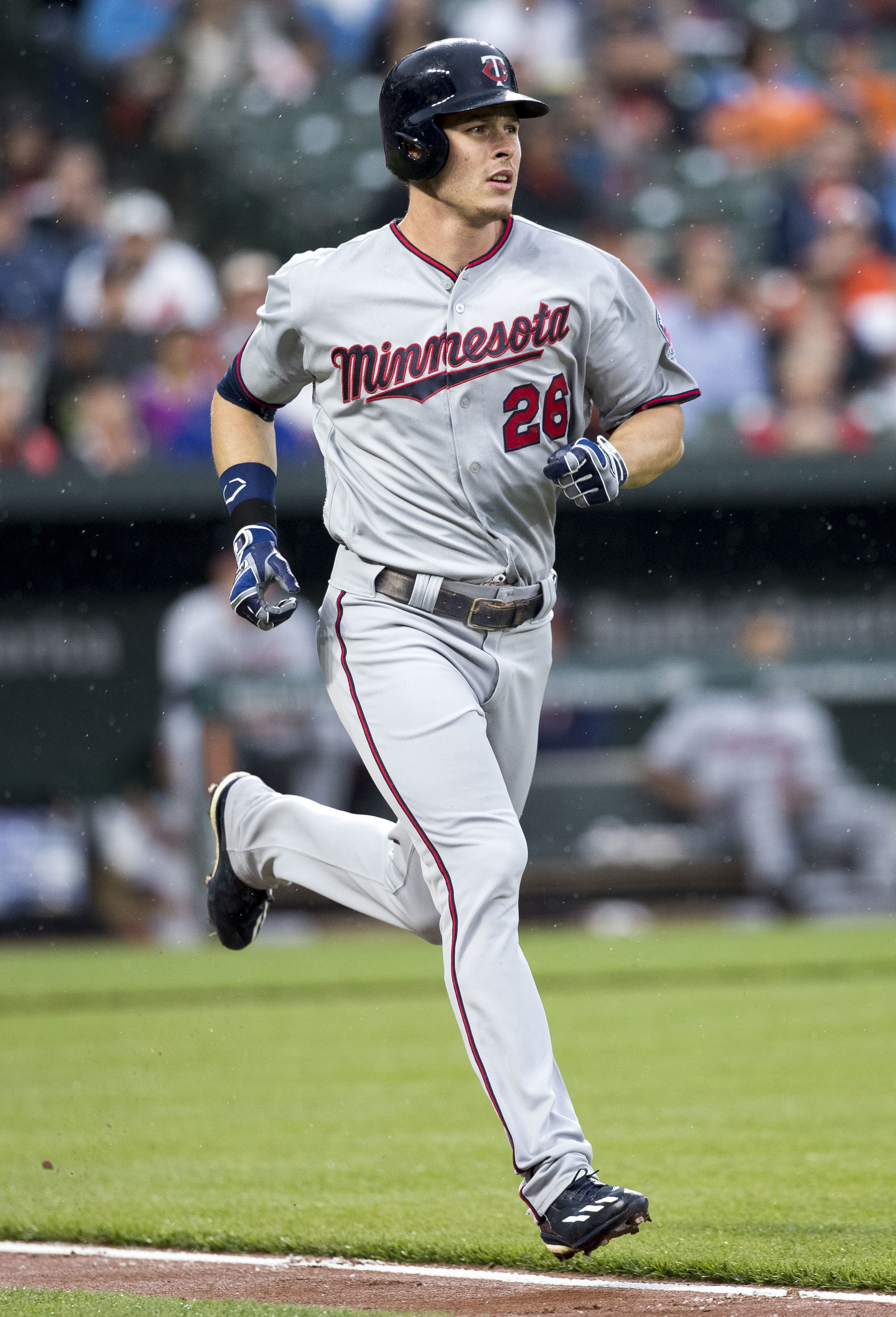
Kepler in 2017

==== 2019 season ====
Kepler signed a five-year, $35 million contract with the Twins on February 14, 2019. The deal also included a team option for the 2024 season.

He won his second career American League Player of the Week award for the week of May 26. Kepler had his second career three home run game on June 6. All three home runs came against Trevor Bauer. He hit two more home runs against Bauer in a game on July 13. This was the first time in Major League history that a batter homered in five consecutive at bats against the same pitcher during a single season.

Kepler finished the 2019 season with 36 home runs, which is the single season Major League record for home runs by a European-born player. He passed former Giants outfielder Bobby Thomson, who hit 32 home runs during the 1951 season. He also drove in a career high 90 runs, and finished 20th in the American League MVP voting.

==== 2020 season ====
Kepler was the Twins lead-off hitter on opening day, homering against Chicago White Sox starter Lucas Giolito on the first pitch of the season. He also homered again during his second at-bat of the game. This made him the second player in Major League history to hit a home run in the first two innings of a season, following Ted Kluszewski of the Angels (April 11, 1961). Kepler had a walk-off single against the Detroit Tigers on September 22.

He finished the 2020 season with a .228 batting average, hitting nine home runs and driving in 23 runs.

==== 2021 season ====
Kepler batted a career-low .211 with 19 home runs and 54 runs batted in. He had a walk-off single against the Boston Red Sox on April 15, and another against the Detroit Tigers on July 26.

==== 2022 season ====
Kepler batted .227/.318/.348 with nine home runs and 43 runs batted in during the 2022 season. He was hampered by a second-half pinkie toe injury, and was ultimately shut down in early September.

==== 2023 season ====
Kepler had a bounce back season in 2023, batting .260 and leading the Twins with 24 home runs. He was especially strong in the second half, batting .306 after the All-Star break as opposed to .207 before the break. This helped the Twins win their third American League Central title in five seasons.

==== 2024 season ====
The Twins exercised their $10 million team option on Kepler on November 2, 2023. He broke the Target Field home run record on June 14, 2024, against the Oakland Athletics. Kepler also delivered a walk-off single later that night. Kepler recorded another walk-off single on July 24, against the Philadelphia Phillies. It was the 11th walk-off plate appearance of his career, which tied a franchise record.

In 105 games for Minnesota, he slashed .253/.302(a career low)/.380 with eight home runs and 42 RBI. Kepler was placed on the injured list with left knee patellar tendinitis on September 5. He was transferred to the 60–day injured list with a hip injury on September 27, ending his season.

=== Philadelphia Phillies ===
On December 20, 2024, Kepler signed a one-year, $10 million contract with the Philadelphia Phillies. Kepler made 127 appearances for Philadelphia during the 2025 campaign, batting .216/.300/.391 with 18 home runs and 52 RBI. He became a free agent again after the season.

=== Arizona Diamondbacks ===
On January 9, 2026, Kepler received an 80 game suspension from MLB as a result of testing positive for epitrenbolone, a performance-enhancing substance, in violation of the Major League Baseball drug policy. On June 7, Kepler signed a one-year, major league contract with the Arizona Diamondbacks. He was activated for his season debut on June 25. Across 41 games for Arizona, Kepler batted .205/.262/.303 with two home runs and 15 RBI. On September 6, he was designated for assignment by the Diamondbacks. Kepler was released by Arizona two days later after clearing waivers.
