= Heidenheim Heideköpfe =

German baseball and softball club

Logo
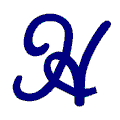
Cap insignia

Information
- League: Deutsche Baseball Liga (Süd)
- Location: Heidenheim an der Brenz
- Ballpark: New Heideköpfe Ballpark
- Founded: 1992
- League championships: 2009, 2015, 2017, 2019, 2020, 2021, 2025
- Colors: burgundy / navy blue / white
- General manager: Klaus Eckle
- Manager: Troy Williams
- Website: www.heidekoepfe.de

Heidenheim Heideköpfe is a German baseball and softball club from Heidenheim an der Brenz, Baden-Württemberg. The club was established in 1992 as the baseball arm of Heidenheimer Sportbund (SB), a parent organization that contains several clubs in different sports, and played its first season in 1993 in the Baden-Württemberg District League. The first men's team was promoted to the first division of the Baseball Bundesliga for the 2001 season and has played there in every season since, winning championships in 2009, 2015, 2017 and 2019.

The team's name means "heathland's head," a reference to Heidenheim's coat of arms. The team mascot is Heiko, a life-sized teddy bear made by the Margarete-Steiff-Company.

The club participated in the European Champion Cup Final Four in 2010, losing 4-1 in the semifinals to Serie A1 club Telemarket Rimini. In 2019 the CEB Cup was won ahead of the Czech club Draci Brno and the French club Montigny Cougars.

== Club structure ==
The full club consists of 7 teams:

- 1st Men's Baseball, Bundesliga's 1st Division
- 2nd Men's Baseball, Bundesliga's 2nd Division
- 3rd Men's Baseball, Bezirksliga
- Student
- Youth
- Juniors
- Softball Fun-(Fan-)Team

Heideköpfe claims Voith AG, Hartmann AG, Heidenheim Volksbank eG, and Stadtwerke Heidenheim AG among its corporate sponsors.

== Field ==
Heideköpfe play their home games at New Heideköpfe Ballpark. Completed in 2002, the field is 98 meters (322 ft) down the lines and 120 meters (394 ft) to center. It has fixed seating of 500 and a grassy picnic area that can accommodate an additional 2,500 spectators. The team claims an average attendance of 350, with a peak home attendance of 1,500 on August 21, 1994 against the Stuttgart Reds, prior to the construction of the new ballpark.

== Season by season performance (1st Bundesliga) ==
Year	Rank	Games	W	L	Win%	Season Notes
2001	5	32	18	14	.563	
2002	3	28	19	9	.679	Lost to Cologne Dodgers in quarter-finals, 1-3
2003	3	28	18	10	.643	Lost to Cologne Dodgers in quarter-finals, 1-3
2004	5	30	9	21	.300	
2005	4	28	17	11	.607	Lost to Paderborn Untouchables in quarter-finals, 1-3
2006	2	28	20	8	.714	Lost to Solingen Alligators in semi-finals, 1-3
2007	3	28	18	10	.643	Lost to Regensburg Legionaere in semi-finals, 1-3
2008	1	28	23	5	.821	Lost to Mannheim Tornados in semi-finals, 0-3
2009	2	24	18	6	.750	Defeated the Mannheim Tornados in finals, 3-2, to win the club's 1st championship
2010	1	28	22	6	.786	Lost to Regensburg Legionäre in finals, 2-3
2011	2	28	17	7	.708	Lost to Bonn Capitals in quarter-finals, 2-3
2012	2	28	16	8	.667	Lost to Paderborn Untouchables in semi-finals, 1-3
2013	2	28	22	6	.786	Lost to Solingen Alligators in semi-finals, 1-3
2014	1	28	25	3	.893	Lost to Solingen Alligators in finals, 1-3
2015	2	28	22	6	.786	Defeated the Regensburg Legionäre in finals, 3-2, 2nd championship
2016	3	28	19	9	.679	Lost to Mainz Athletics in semi-finals, 2-3
2017	1	28	22	6	.786	Defeated the Bonn Capitals in finals, 3-2, 3rd championship
2018	2	28	23	5	.821	Lost to Bonn Capitals in finals, 2-3
2019	6	28	17	11	.607	defeated the Bonn Capitals in finals, 3-1
2020	3	14	13	1	.929	defeated the Bonn Capitals in finals, 3-0
2021	2	25	3	1	.893	defeated the Bonn Capitals in finals, 3-1
