= Paderborn Untouchables =

Untouchables Paderborn
- Logo

Information
- League: Deutsche Baseball Liga (Nord)
- Location: Paderborn, North Rhine-Westphalia
- Ballpark: Ahorn-Ballpark
- Founded: 1990
- League championships: 6 (1999, 2001, 2002, 2003, 2004, 2005)
- Division championships: 8 (1999, 2001, 2002, 2003, 2004, 2005, 2011, 2012)
- Colors: Green, gold and black
- Manager: Octavio Medina
- Website: www.untouchables.eu

Current uniforms
Home	Away

Untouchables Paderborner Baseball Club e.V., commonly referred to as Untouchables Paderborn, is a German baseball team in the Baseball-Bundesliga located in the city of Paderborn in North Rhine-Westphalia. The club was established in 1990.

The Untouchables' club colors are green, gold and black, and the nickname is U's. The Untouchables won every Baseball-Bundesliga championship between 1999 and 2005, except for the 2000 season. The Untouchables have also won the junior Baseball-Bundesliga in 2003, the youth Baseball-Bundesliga in 2002 and 2004, the men's Cup (DBV-Pokal) in 1998 and 1999, and the European Cup in 2003.

The Untouchables compete in the 1st Bundesliga North division of the Baseball-Bundesliga and play at the Ahorn-Ballpark, one of the biggest baseball stadiums in Germany, with a capacity of about 1,200 spectators.

== History ==
Untouchables Paderborn were founded on 4 August 1990 and were admitted in the Baseball and Softball Association of North Rhine-Westphalia on 16 December 1990. In 1994, the club participated for the first time in the 2. Baseball-Bundesliga after winning local competitions. In 1995, the Untouchables win the 2. Baseball-Bundesliga and are promoted to the Baseball-Bundesliga, making their debut in Germany's top baseball competition in 1996. In 1997, Ahorn-Ballpark, the club's home ballpark, is built.

In 1999, the club won its first German championship. From 2001 to 2005, Untouchables won the Bundesliga five times in a row. All the championships under manager Martin Helmig. The team finished in second place in the Bundesliga Nord in 2010, ultimately losing in the semifinals to the ultimate champion Regensburg Legionare.

== Ballpark ==
The Untouchables play their home games in the Ahorn-Ballpark, with a capacity of 1,200 spectators. The Ahorn-Ballpark was inaugurated on 1 May 1997 with a game of the Untouchables against the Cologne Dodgers, that was attended by approximately 800 spectators.

== Roster ==
Untouchables Paderborn roster
Players		Coaches
Pitchers: 47 (Germany) Steffen Dembowski; 23 (Germany) Mark Harrison; 1 (Germany) Florian Herwig; 44 (Germany) Luca Kloppenburg; 11 (Germany) Florian Seidel; 12 (Germany) Benjamin Thaqi; 28 (Germany) Jan-Luca Vogt; 34 (Germany) Lasse Nixdorf	Catchers: 6 (Germany) Jann-Mika Schierhorn; Infielders: 13 (Germany) Finn Bergmann; 31 (South Africa) Chris Beyers; 27 (Germany) Linus Nixdorf; 16 (Germany) Jules Moser; 40 (Japan) Shotaro Usui; Outfielders: 2 (Germany) Luca Rammelmann; 17 (Germany) Emilio Götz; 39 (Germany) Bjarne Reinhardt	Manager: 9 (Germany) Octavio Medina (coach); Coaches: 15 (United States) Matt Kemp; Roster updated on 15 January 2024

== Season by season performance (1st Bundesliga) ==
Year	Rank	Games	W	L	Win%	Season Notes
2007	2	28	17	7	.607	Lost in Quarterfinals to Heidenheim Heideköpfe, 1-3
2008	2	28	25	3	.892	Lost in Quarterfinals to Mannheim Tornados, 2-3
2009	2	24	18	6	.750	Lost to Mannheim Tornados in Quarterfinals, 1-3
2010	2	28	20	8	.714	Lost to Regensburg Legionaere in Semifinals, 1-3

== European Champions Cup record ==
Year	Venue	Finish	Wins	Losses	Win%	Manager
2023	(Netherlands) Bussum	7th	2	3	.400	(United States) Matt Kemp
Total			2	3	.400	
