= Mannheim Tornados =

German baseball and softball club

Information
- League: Baseball-Bundesliga (Bundesliga Süd)
- Location: Mannheim
- Ballpark: Roberto Clemente Field, 1,000 capacity
- Founded: 1975
- League championships: 1982, 1984, 1985, 1986, 1987, 1988, 1989, 1991, 1993, 1994, 1997
- Colors: red / black / white
- General manager: George Bull
- Manager: George Bull
- Website: www.tornados.de

The Mannheim Tornados are a professional baseball and softball club from Mannheim, Baden-Württemberg. Founded in 1975, it is the oldest continuing baseball club in Germany. The first men's team plays in the first division of the Baseball Bundesliga and has won 11 championships, the most of any club to reach the top tier of German baseball. The team won every championship between 1984 and 1989. However, the Tornados have not won a championship since 1997, though they perennially make the playoffs.

== Club structure ==
The full club consists of 12 teams:

- 1st Men's, plays in Bundesliga's 1st Division
- Men's Regional
- Association Men's League
- 1st Women's
- Association Women's League
- Juniors (16–18 years)
- Youth (13–15 years)
- Student (9–12 years)
- Junior Women (17–19 years)
- T-Ball (4–8 years)
- 2 recreational teams (Slow Pitch)
- Mixed Team League Softball Fast Pitch

Each member pays an annual club fee, ranging from €55 for ordinary members to €170 for active adult members. The club also set up a separate organization, The Friends of the Baseball Club Tornados Mannheim eV. It is classified as a charitable organization by the City of Mannheim, and has an annual membership fee of €24.

== Season by season performance (1st Bundesliga) ==
| Year | Rank | Games | W | L | Win% | Season Notes |
|---|---|---|---|---|---|---|
| 2007 | 3 | 28 | 18 | 10 | .642 | Lost to Solingen Alligators in Quarterfinals, 1-3 |
| 2008 | 3 | 28 | 18 | 10 | .642 | Lost to Regensburg Legionaere in Finals, 2-3 |
| 2009 | 3 | 24 | 15 | 9 | .625 | Lost to Heidenheim Heideköpfe in Finals, 2-3 |
| 2010 | 3 | 28 | 17 | 11 | .607 | Lost to Paderborn Untouchables in Quarterfinals, 2-3 |

== Retired numbers ==
The team has five retired numbers:

- 30 - Frank Jäger, played 390 games with the Tornados from 1984 to 2000, batting .314 lifetime
- 22 - Bernard Pickett, known as "Yogi," played 213 games with the Tornados and batted .413 lifetime
- 20 - Stephan Jäger, hit .425 for the Tornados over 194 games
- 35 - Eddy Polanco, hit .413 over 221 games for the Tornados
- 44 - Klaus Knüttel, played 498 games in his Tornados jersey, pitched 1121 strikeouts in 1129 innings. Also a power hitter, he had 97 home runs, 20 triples, and 9 doubles during his career.
