= Deutsche Baseball Liga =

German baseball league

- Sport: Baseball
- Founded: 1984 (Baseball-Bundesliga, DBL since 2025)
- No. of teams: 12
- Country: Germany
- Most recent champions: Bonn Capitals (4th title)
- Most titles: Mannheim Tornados (10 titles)
- Website: baseball.de

The Deutsche Baseball Liga (English: German Baseball League) or DBL is the premier professional league of baseball in Germany. Until 2024, the league was called Baseball-Bundesliga. The winner is awarded the German championship. Like most European sports leagues, the league uses a system of promotion and relegation and currently consists of twelve teams in two divisions, North and South, with six teams each. The league is regulated by the German Baseball and Softball Federation (DBV).

== History ==
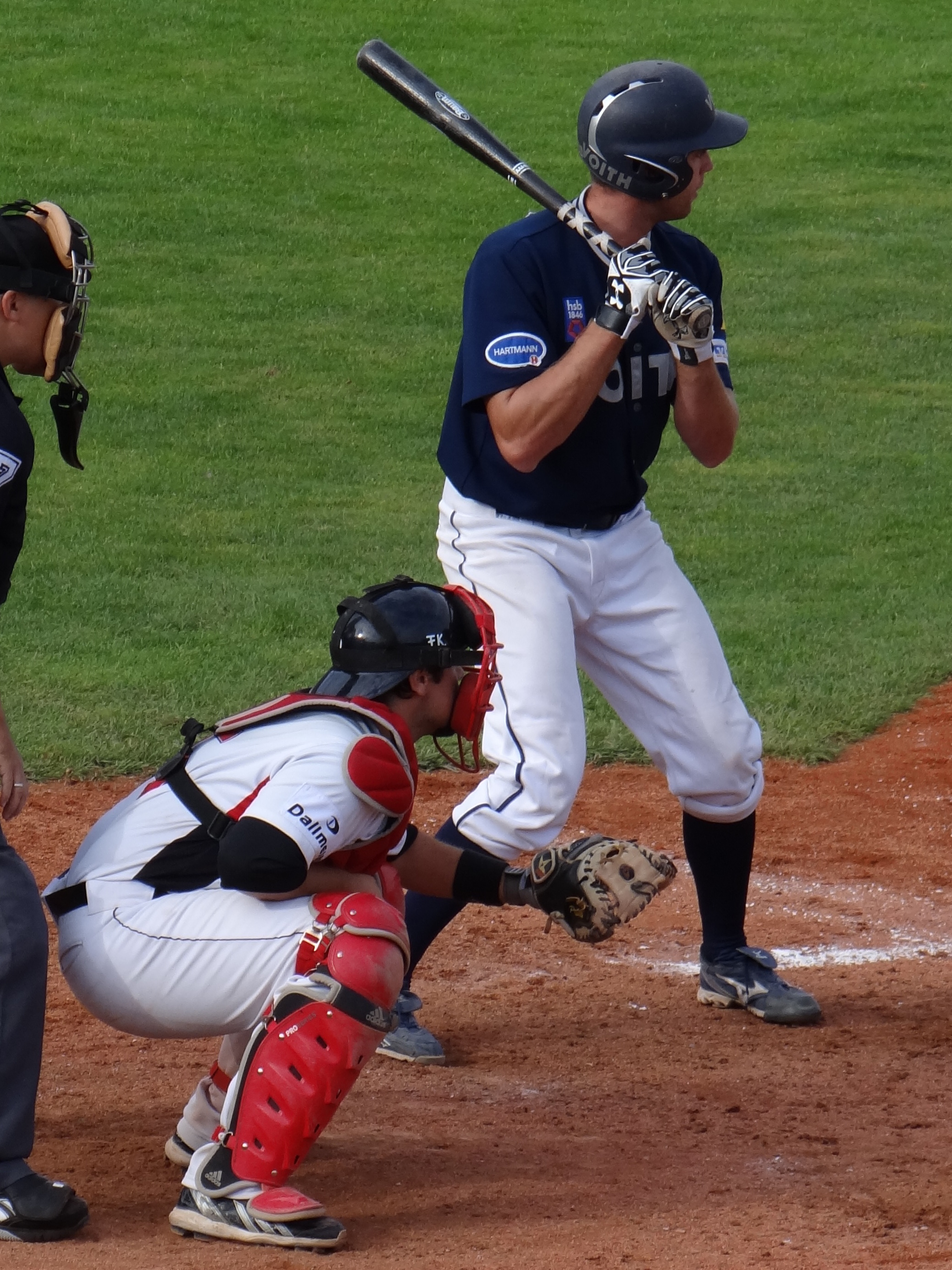
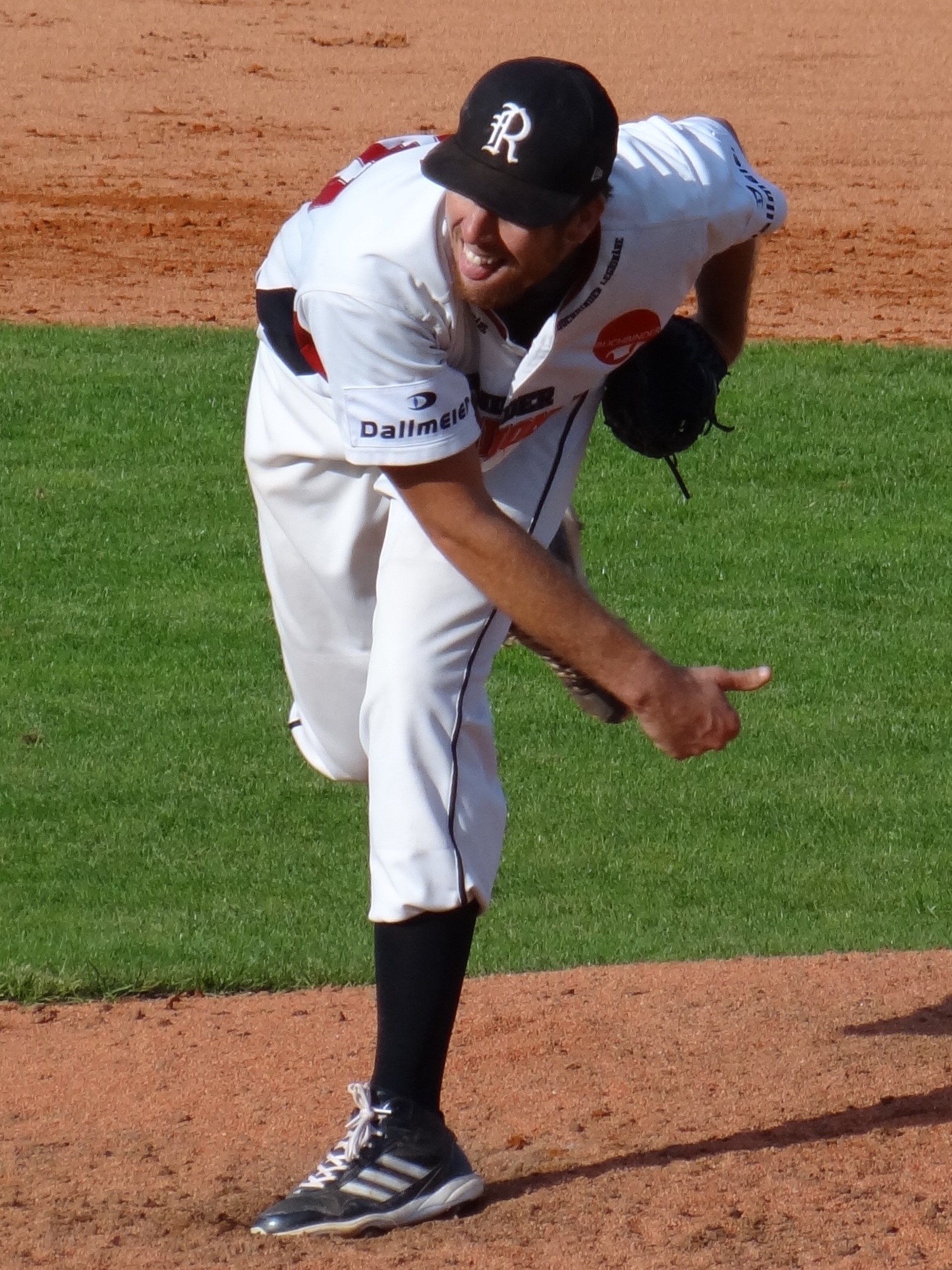
A Heidenheim Heideköpfe batter (left) and Regensburg Legionäre pitcher during the 2015 Bundesliga championship series

A precursor to the DBL was founded in 1951, with the Stuttgart Phillies winning the inaugural national championship. However, the league disbanded following the 1970 season, leaving Germany without a national baseball league for 11 years.

The DBL, in its current incarnation, was established in 1982. Two teams produced dynasties during the league's first two decades of operation: the Mannheim Tornados won every championship from 1984 to 1989, and the Paderborn Untouchables won every championship from 2001 to 2005. The league claims that in 1990, there were 2,000 baseball players in Germany, while that number has grown to exceed 30,000 today.

In 2010, the league promoted the Dohren Wild Farmers and the Neuenburg Atomics. At the end of the season, the Neuenburg Atomics were relegated with the worst record in the Southern Division (1–27). The Saarlouis Hornets voluntarily relegated themselves for financial reasons, despite posting the best record (19–21) in a ten-year history in the first division, causing the Southern Division to contract from eight to seven teams. The two teams were replaced by the Bad Homburg Hornets. In the Northern Division, the Cologne Cardinals were relegated at the end the season and replaced by the champions of the second division, the Berlin Sluggers.

A motion to reduce the league from 16 to 12 teams was denied by a Competition Commission established by the DBV prior to a general meeting of all the baseball clubs in Germany in Frankfurt am Main on 13 November 2010. At the meeting itself, it was agreed to add an All Star Game for the 2012 season.

== Season format ==
The regular season for the 1. Bundesliga is split into two divisions, Nord (North) and Süd (South), with each having eight teams. The season has a total of 28 games, with each team playing every other team twice. Games are normally hosted on weekends. The game format is the same as Major League Baseball, with a 9-inning format and extra innings afterward if the game is still tied. Unlike MLB, the 1. Bundesliga has a mercy rule, with a team that leading by ten runs or more by the end of the seventh inning awarded the victory.

The four best-placed teams in each division of the 1. Bundesliga play in an interleague round, with subsequent playoffs determining the German championship, while the other teams in each group determine possible relegation in the play-down round. In the interleague round, the top four teams in each league play the top four of the other league, with teams playing back-to-back doubleheader matches in a ballpark on the same day, giving each team a chance to play at home and away. After the interleague round, the seeding list for the playoffs is determined, this only includes the games of the regular season and the interleague round, between the eight teams involved in the interleague round. 1st vs 8th, 2nd vs 7th and so on.

The playoff rounds differ from the interleague round, although they have a similar concept. All rounds are best-of-five series, with the quarterfinals and semifinals held in a doubleheader format over two weekends on Saturdays. If a game five is necessary in a series, it is played on the Sunday after games three and four. The championship series is played in individual games instead of the doubleheader format, with games divided up between the teams' home fields; game one and two are played at the home field of the team with the better regular season record, and games three and four are played at the home field of the team with the worse record. If a fifth game is required to crown the German Champion (Deutscher Meister), it is played at the home field of the team with the better record.

== Champions ==
See: German champions (baseball) § 1982-present

Year	German Champions	Southern League Winners	Northern League Winners
1984	Mannheim Tornados	Mannheim Tornados	Cologne Dodgers
1985	Mannheim Tornados	played out as a single-track Bundesliga	
1986	Mannheim Tornados	played out as a single-track Bundesliga	
1987	Mannheim Tornados	played out as a single-track Bundesliga	
1988	Mannheim Tornados	played out as a single-track Bundesliga	
1989	Mannheim Tornados	played out as a single-track Bundesliga	
1990	Cologne Cardinals	Mannheim Tornados	Berlin Challengers
1991	Mannheim Tornados	Mannheim Tornados	Berlin Challengers
1992	Mannheim Amigos	Mannheim Tornados	Cologne Cardinals
1993	Mannheim Tornados	Mannheim Amigos	Lokstedt Stealers
1994	Mannheim Tornados	Mannheim Amigos	Lokstedt Stealers
1995	Trier Cardinals	Trier Cardinals	Lokstedt Stealers
1996	Trier Cardinals	Trier Cardinals	Lokstedt Stealers
1997	Mannheim Tornados	Mannheim Tornados	Bonn Capitals
1998	Cologne Dodgers	Mannheim Tornados	Cologne Dodgers
1999	Paderborn Untouchables	Mainz Athletics	Paderborn Untouchables
2000	Lokstedt Stealers	Mainz Athletics	Cologne Dodgers
2001	Paderborn Untouchables	Mannheim Tornados	Cologne Dodgers
2002	Paderborn Untouchables	Regensburg Legionäre	Paderborn Untouchables
2003	Paderborn Untouchables	Mannheim Tornados	Paderborn Untouchables
2004	Paderborn Untouchables	Mainz Athletics	Paderborn Untouchables
2005	Paderborn Untouchables	Regensburg Legionäre	Paderborn Untouchables
2006	Solingen Alligators	Regensburg Legionäre	Solingen Alligators
2007	Mainz Athletics	Regensburg Legionäre	Solingen Alligators
2008	Buchbinder Legionäre	Heidenheim Heideköpfe	Solingen Alligators
2009	Heidenheim Heideköpfe	Buchbinder Legionäre	Solingen Alligators
2010	Buchbinder Legionäre	Buchbinder Legionäre	Solingen Alligators
2011	Buchbinder Legionäre	Buchbinder Legionäre	Paderborn Untouchables
2012	Buchbinder Legionäre	Buchbinder Legionäre	Paderborn Untouchables
2013	Buchbinder Legionäre	Buchbinder Legionäre	Solingen Alligators
2014	Solingen Alligators	Heidenheim Heideköpfe	Solingen Alligators
2015	Heidenheim Heideköpfe	Buchbinder Legionäre	Bonn Capitals
2016	Mainz Athletics	Mainz Athletics	Bonn Capitals
2017	Heidenheim Heideköpfe	Heidenheim Heideköpfe	Bonn Capitals
2018	Bonn Capitals	Heidenheim Heideköpfe	Bonn Capitals
2019	Heidenheim Heideköpfe	Mainz Athletics	Solingen Alligators
2020	Heidenheim Heideköpfe	Buchbinder Legionäre	Bonn Capitals
2021	Heidenheim Heideköpfe	Heidenheim Heideköpfe	Bonn Capitals
2022	Bonn Capitals	Buchbinder Legionäre	Bonn Capitals
2023	Heidenheim Heideköpfe	Heidenheim Heideköpfe	Bonn Capitals
2024	Bonn Capitals	Guggenberger Legionäre	Bonn Capitals
2025	Heidenheim Heideköpfe	Guggenberger Legionäre	Bonn Capitals
2026	Bonn Capitals	Heidenheim Heideköpfe	Bonn Capitals

== Current teams ==
The following teams are participating in the 2026 season:

2025 DBL teams (North Division and South Division)

Division	Team	Location	Field	Founded
North	Bonn Capitals	(North Rhine-Westphalia) Bonn	Stadion Rheinaue	1989
North	Cologne Cardinals	(North Rhine-Westphalia) Cologne	Circlewood Stadium	1983
North	Dortmund Wanderers	(North Rhine-Westphalia) Dortmund	Hoeschpark, Dortmund	1989
North	Hamburg Stealers	Hamburg	Baseballfeld Langenhorst	1985
North	Hünstetten Storm	(Hesse) Hünstetten	Dickman Field	2003
North	Paderborn Untouchables	(North Rhine-Westphalia) Paderborn	Ahorn-Ballpark	1990
South	Gauting Indians	(Bavaria) Gauting	Würmtal Baseball Platz	1991
South	Regensburg Legionäre	(Bavaria) Regensburg	Armin-Wolf-Arena	1987
South	Heidenheim Heideköpfe	(Baden-Württemberg) Heidenheim an der Brenz	HellensteinEnergie Ballpark	1992
South	Mainz Athletics	(Rhineland-Palatinate) Mainz	Baseballstadion Hartmühlenweg	1988
South	München-Haar Disciples	(Bavaria) Haar	Ballpark Eglfing	1990
South	Stuttgart Reds	(Baden-Württemberg) Stuttgart	TVC-Ballpark	1986

== See also ==
- Baseball awards § Germany
- Baseball awards § Europe
