= Solingen Alligators =

- Logo

Information
- League: Baseball-Bundesliga (Bundesliga Nord)
- Location: Solingen
- Ballpark: Baseballpark Weyersberg
- Founded: 1991
- League championships: 2006, 2014
- Colors: green / white / yellow
- General manager: Wayne Ough
- Manager: Peter Niemeyer
- Website: solingen-alligators.com

The Solingen Alligators are a German baseball and softball club from Solingen, North Rhine-Westphalia. The club was founded in 1991 and the first men's team was promoted to the first division of the Baseball Bundesliga for the 2003 season. It has played there in every season since, winning the league championship in 2006 and 2014. The club claims over 250 members.

== Club structure ==
The full club consists of 9 teams:

- 1st Men's Baseball, Bundesliga's 1st Division
- 2nd Men's Baseball, Bundesliga's 2nd Division
- 3rd Men's Baseball, Bezirksliga
- Juniors
- Youth 1
- Youth 2
- Adult Pitch
- Tee Ball
- Hobby Team

== Season by season performance (1st Bundesliga) ==
Year	Rank	Games	W	L	Win%	Season Notes
2007	1	24	22	2	.917	Lost to Mainz Athletics in Semifinals, 1-3
2008	1	28	27	1	.964	Lost to Regensburg Legionäre in Semifinals, 1-3
2009	1	24	20	4	.833	Lost to Heidenheim Heideköpfe in Semifinals, 2-3
2010	1	28	24	4	.857	Lost to Heidenheim Heideköpfe in Semifinals, 0-3
2011	2	28	21	7	.750	Lost to Buchbinder Legionare Regensburg in Semifinals
2012	2	28	21	7	.750	Lost to Buchbinder Legionare Regensburg in Semifinals
2013	1	28	23	5	.821	Lost to Buchbinder Legionare Regensburg in Finals
2014	1	24	21	3	.875	Champions
2015	2	24	21	3	.875	Lost to Buchbinder Legionare Regensburg in Semifinals
2016	1	24	16	8	.667	Lost to Heidenheim Heideköpfe in Quarterfinals
