= Mainz Athletics =

Baseball and softball club from Mainz, Germany

Coordinates: 50.009°N 8.226°E

Logo	Cap insignia

Information
- League: Baseball-Bundesliga (Bundesliga Süd)
- Location: Mainz, Rhineland-Palatinate
- Ballpark: Ballpark am Hartmühlenweg
- Founded: 1988
- League championships: 2007, 2016
- Division championships: 1999, 2000, 2004, 2016
- Colors: Green and gold
- General manager: Nici Wiecert
- Manager: Will Kilgore
- Website: www.mainz-athletics.de

The Baseball and Softball Club Mainz Athletics 1988 e.V., commonly referred to as Mainz Athletics, is a German baseball and softball club located in the city of Mainz in Rhineland-Palatinate. The Athletics, along with Regensburg Legionäre, is one of the largest clubs in the Baseball-Bundesliga Süd in terms of membership, claiming to have hundreds of active players. The club has played in the Baseball-Bundesliga for more than two decades, winning the German Championship in the 2007 and 2016 season.

== History ==
The team was established in 1988 as a split of the Mainz Rangers and played its first games in 1989 under the name Mainz Athletics. This name was chosen because, amongst the founders of the club, none of them had the Oakland Athletics as their favorite team, so the nickname Athletics was selected.

== Season by season performance (1st Bundesliga) ==
Year	Rank	Games	W	L	Win%	Season Notes
2007	2	26	19	7	.731	Defeated Regensburg Legionäre in Finals, 3-2, to win 1st League Championship
2008	4	28	18	10	.642	Lost in quarterfinals to Solingen Alligators, 1-3
2009	4	24	9	15	.375	Lost in quarterfinals to Solingen Alligators, 0-3
2010	7	28	9	19	.321	
2011	3	24	14	10	.583	Lost in quarterfinals to Solingen Alligators, 1-3
2012	3	24	15	9	.625	Lost in quarterfinals to Solingen Alligators, 0-3
2013	4	28	19	9	.679	Lost in quarterfinals to Bonn Capitals, 2-3
2014	5	28	14	14	.500	
2015	4	28	17	11	.607	Lost in quarterfinals to Bonn Capitals, 2-3
2016	1	28	24	4	.857	Defeated Regensburg Legionäre in Finals, 3-1, to win 2nd League Championship

== Ballpark ==
The Mainz Athletics played their home games at Sandflora Ballpark between 1988 and 2010. The field is located between the neighborhoods of Mombach and Gonsenheim, an area that was previously the grounds of an American military installation. Sandflora comprised a baseball and a softball field, both of which were occupied by the Athletics. Since the fields overlap, games could be played on both fields at the same time.

The Bundesliga All-Star Game and the European Cup were held at the Sandflora several times. The field also hosted the 1999 Junior European Championship and in the inaugural 2002 Softball All Star Game.

The field lies in a residential neighborhood, so because a field can become loud during games, the Athletics had to find a new place to play. In 2011 the club played their first game in a new ballpark along the Hartmühlenweg, about 500 meters east of the former facility.

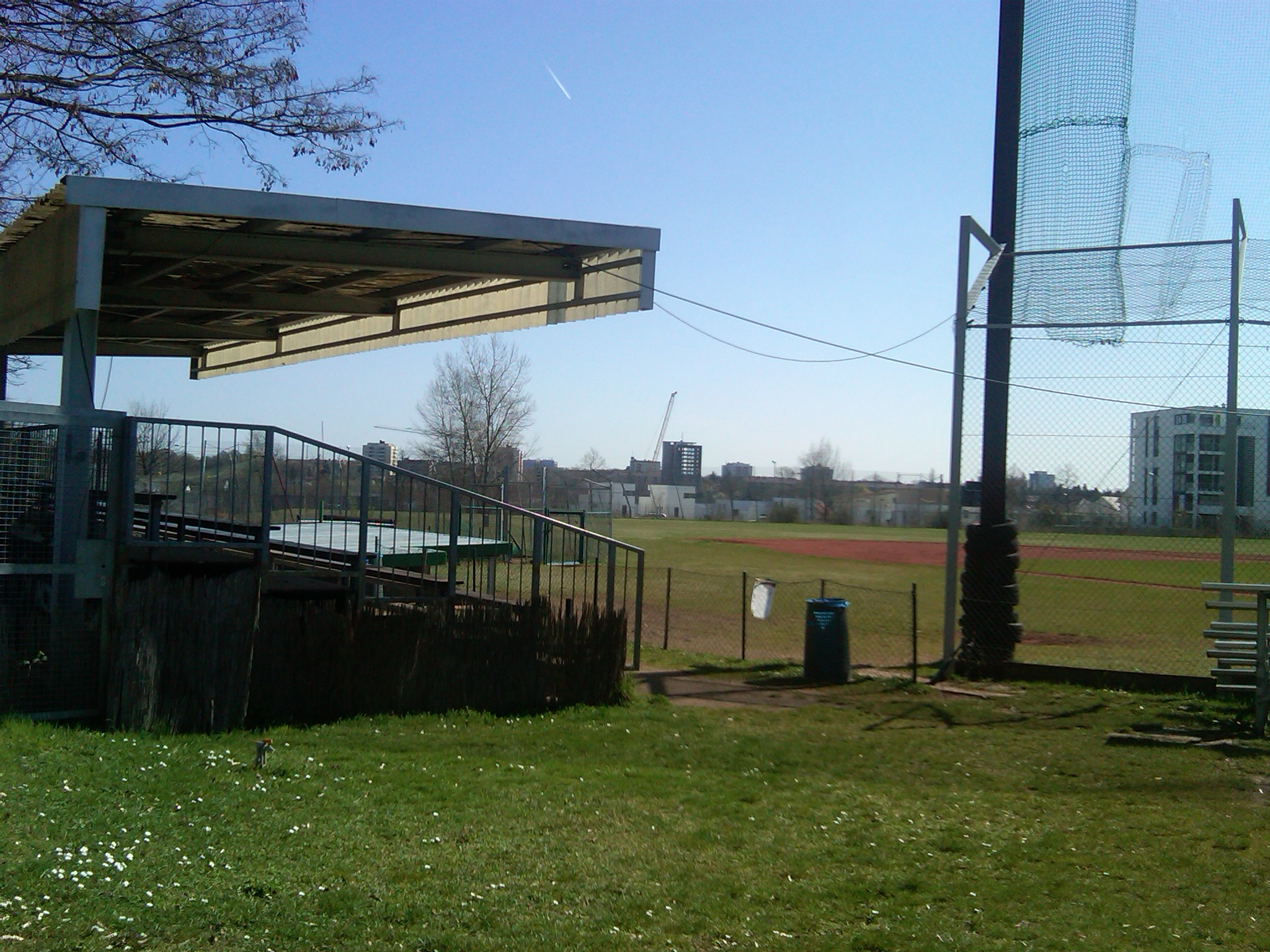
Sandflora Baseball Park, stands overlooking third base line, April 2010

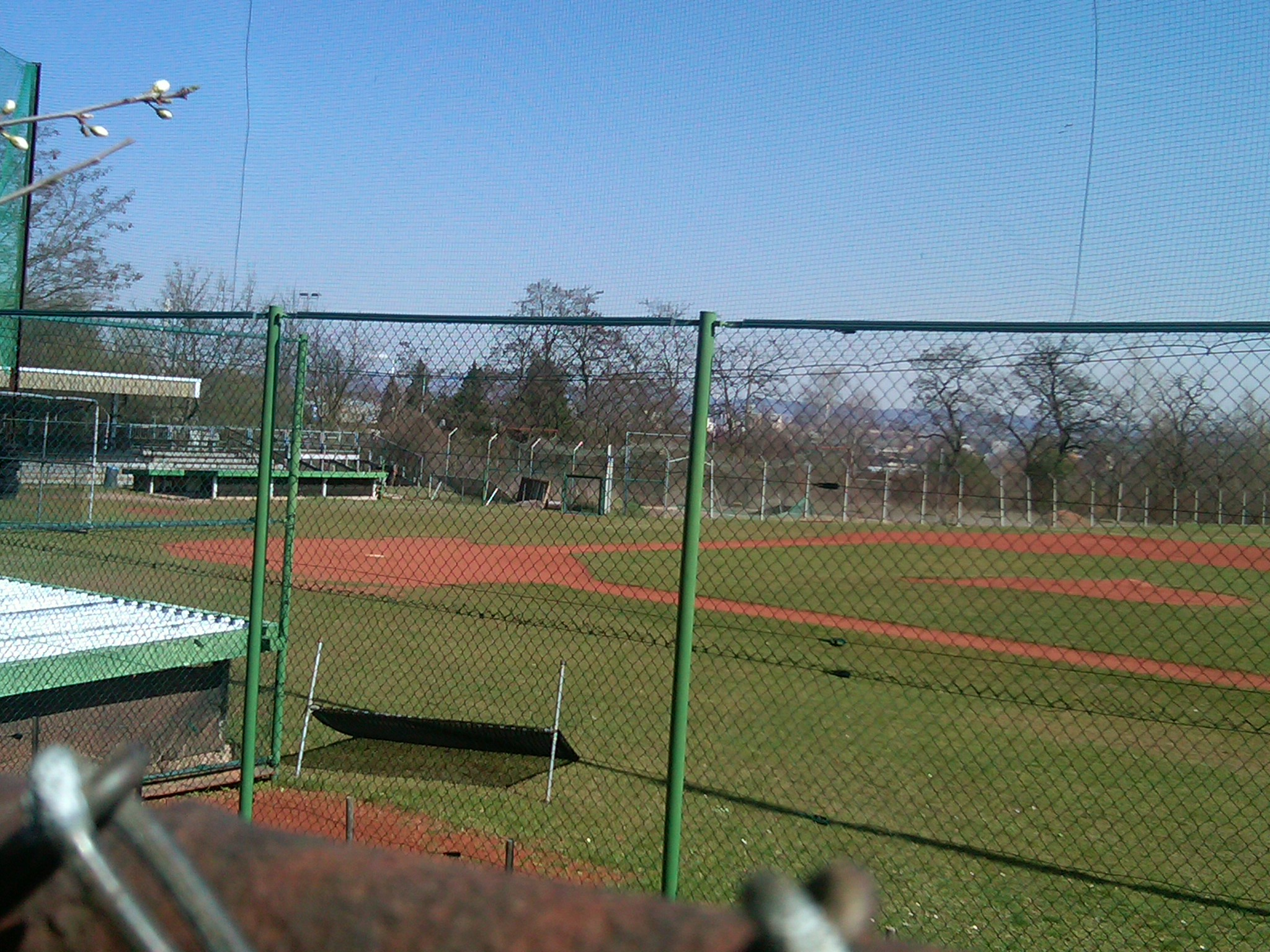
Sandflora Baseball Park, April 2010

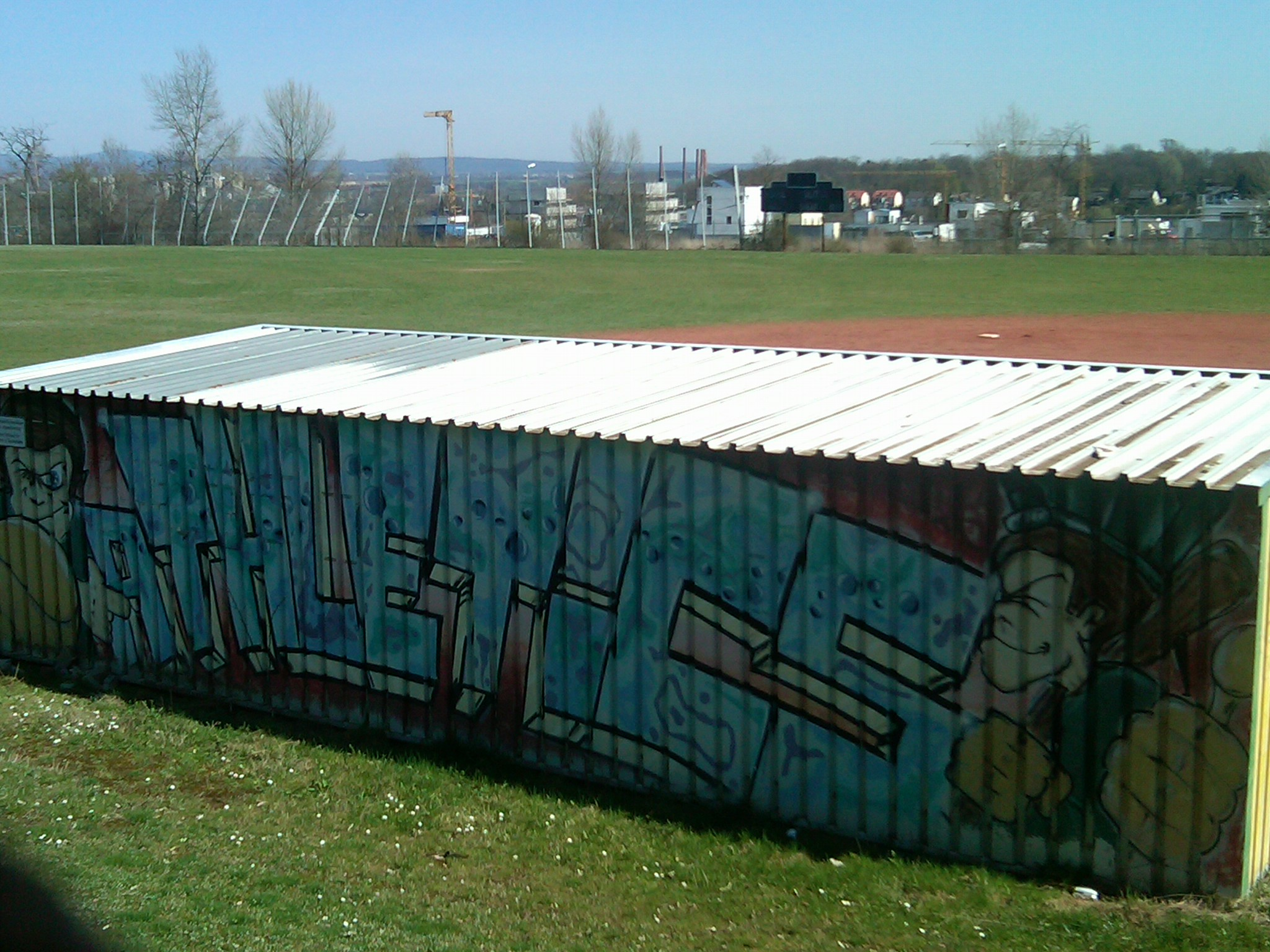
Sandflora Baseball Park, Athletics mural, April 2010

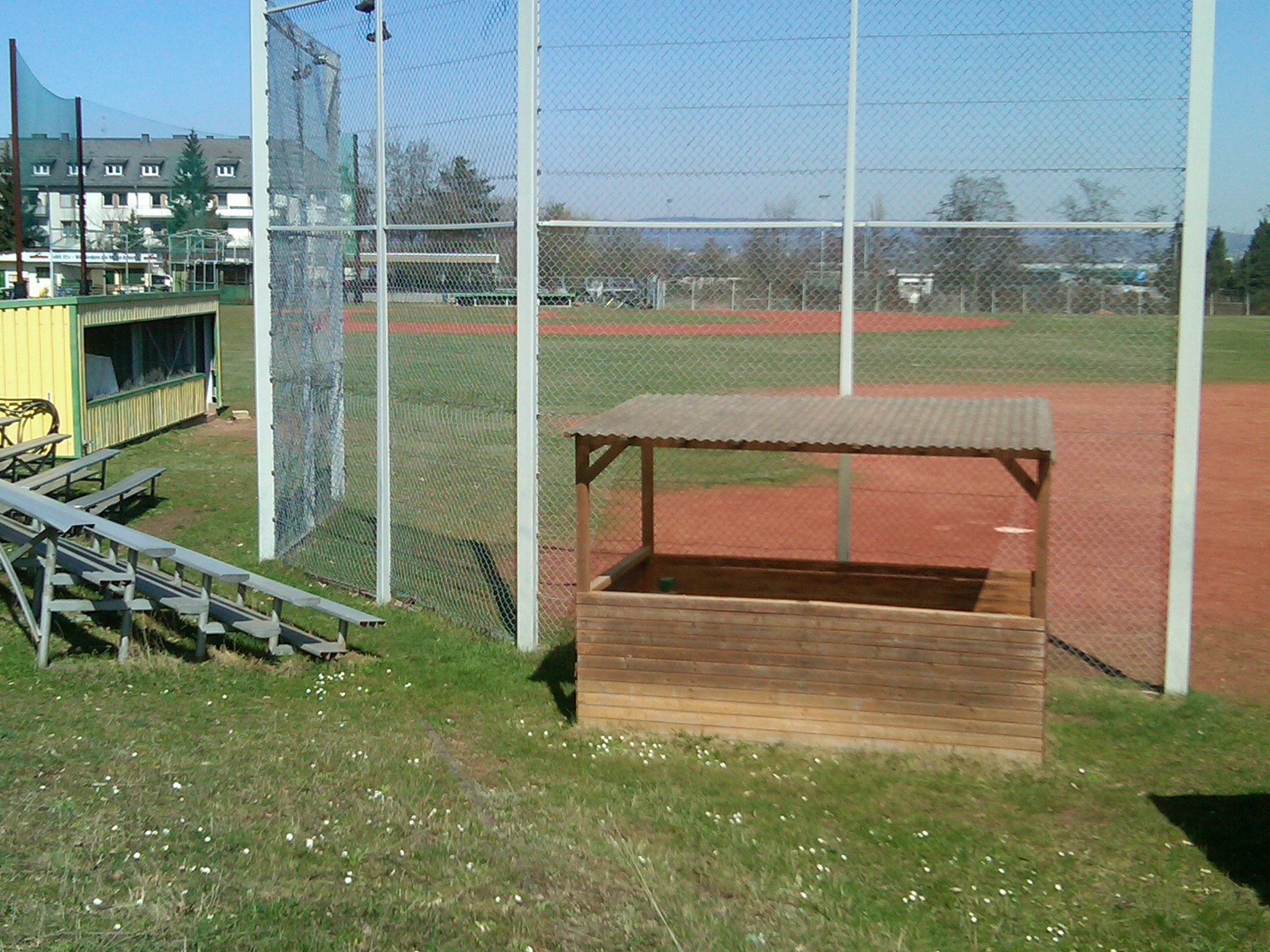
Sandflora Baseball Park, baseball field in background, softball field in foreground, April 2010
