= Regensburg Legionäre =

Baseball team in Bavaria, Germany

- Logo

Information
- League: Baseball-Bundesliga (Süd)
- Location: Regensburg, Bavaria
- Ballpark: Armin-Wolf-Arena
- Founded: 1987
- League championships: 5 (2008, 2010, 2011, 2012, 2013)
- Division championships: 13 (2002, 2005, 2006, 2007, 2009, 2010, 2011, 2012, 2013, 2015, 2020, 2022, 2025)
- Colors: Black, maroon, light blue, white
- Manager: Martin Helmig
- Website: www.legionaere.de

Regensburg Legionäre e.V., commonly referred to as Regensburg Legionäre, is a baseball and softball club from Regensburg, Bavaria. The team is currently known as Guggenberger Legionäre, being sponsored by a construction company from Mintraching. Between 2008 and 2020 the team was called Buchbinder Legionäre after a car rental company.

Founded in 1987, the first men's team plays in the first division of the Baseball-Bundesliga since 1995 and has won the German championship five times in 2008, 2010, 2011, 2012 and 2013. The Legionäre play in the Armin-Wolf-Arena.

== Club structure ==
The full club consists of 11 teams:

- 1st Men's Baseball, plays in Bundesliga's 1st Division
- 2nd Men's Baseball
- Bavarian League Softball
- Bavarian League Baseball
- District League Baseball
- Bayern Youth League
- Youth National League
- Student Livepitching
- Student Tossball
- T-Ball
- Softball, U15

As part of a fund raising effort, Legionäre began selling stock in the club at the price of €100 a share, equating to €1 of the team value. The shares are not marketed as high-return investments but contributions that give the supporter a presence in the organization.

== History ==
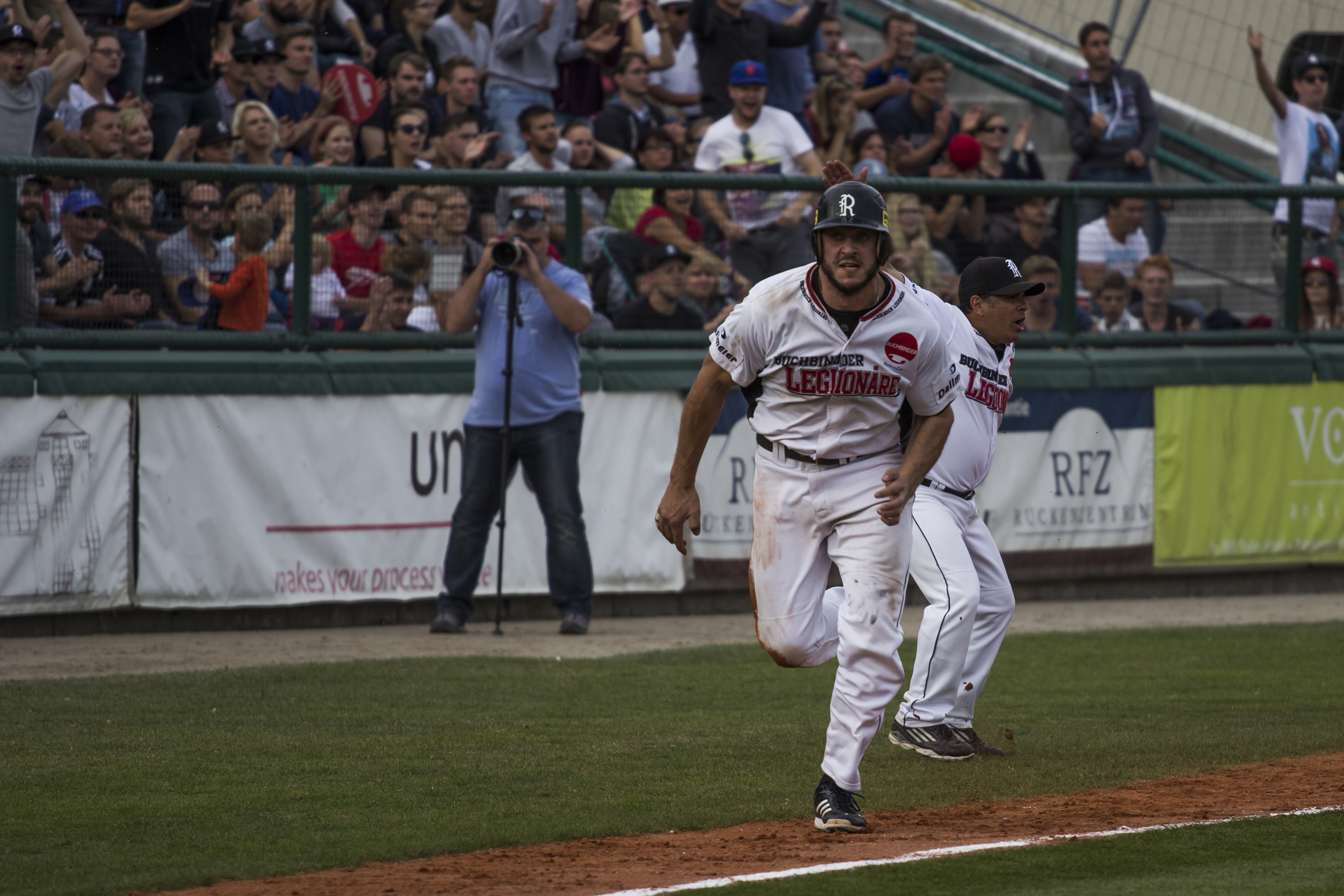
A Legionäre baserunner during the 2015 Bundesliga championship series

In the 2010 season, Legionäre led the Southern Division in most offensive and defensive categories, posting a combined .367 batting average and hitting 21 home runs as a team, while the club's pitching staff posted a 2.21 ERA.

== Roster ==
Regensburg Legionäre roster
Players		Coaches
Pitchers: 31 (South Africa) Derick Baylis; 52 (Germany) Joe Cedano de Leon; 53 (Germany) Tim Fischer; 38 (South Africa) Daniel Mendelsohn; 15 (Brazil) Christian Pedrol; 8 (United States) Devon Ramirez; 30 (Germany) Niklas Rimmel; 45 (United States) Trevor Holloway; 10 (Czech Republic) Jan Tomek; 68 (Germany) Marius Wolf	Catchers: 44 (Czech Republic) Ondřej Novák; 25 (Germany) Elias von Garßen; 36 (Germany) Jonathan Heimler; Infielders: 57 (Germany) David Grimes; 46 (Germany) Marco Iberle; 69 (France) Daniel Patrice; 11 (Germany) Nino Sacasa; 2 (Germany) Alexander Schmidt; 23 (United States) Ronnie Sweeny; 4 (United States) Matt Vance; Outfielders: 73 (Germany) Pascal Amon; 2 (Germany) David Dinski; 12 (Germany) Eric Harms; 45 (Germany) Lou Helmig	Manager: 7 (Germany) Martin Helmig; Coaches: 20 (Italy) Ruggero Bagialemani (bench coach); 21 (Nicaragua) Carlos Holmann (infield); 5 (United States) Daniel Husband (coach); 33 (United States) Andy Tomberlin (hitting); 34 (Germany) Michael Wäller (pitching); Roster updated on 24 January 2024

== Season by season performance (1st Bundesliga) ==
Year	Rank	Games	W	L	Win%	Season Notes
2007	1	25	21	4	.840	Lost to Mainz Athletics in Finals, 2-3
2008	2	28	20	8	.714	Defeated Mannheim Tornados in Finals, 2-3, to win 1st Championship in club history.
2009	1	24	21	3	.875	Lost to Mannheim Tornados in semifinals, 2-3
2010	1	28	24	4	.857	Defeated Heidenheim Heideköpfe in Finals, 3-2, to win 2nd Championship in club history.
2011	1	24	21	3	.875	Defeated Paderborn Untouchables in Finals, 3-2, to win 3rd Championship in club history.
2012	1	24	20	4	.833	Defeated Paderborn Untouchables in Finals, 3-0, to win 4th Championship in club history.
2013	1	28	23	5	.821	Defeated Solingen Alligators in Finals, 3-2, to win 5th Championship in club history and 4th win in a row.
2014	2	28	20	8	.714	Lost to Solingen Alligators in semifinals, 1-3
2015	1	28	24	4	.857	Lost to Heidenheim Heideköpfe in finals, 2-3
2016	2	28	20	8	.714	Lost to Mainz Athletics in finals, 1-3
2017	5	28	14	14	.500	Missed playoffs
2018	2	28	19	9	.679	Lost to Bonn Capitals in semifinals, 2-3
2019	2	28	21	7	.800	Lost to Bonn Capitals in quarterfinals, 2-3
2020	2	14	13	1	.929	Lost to Heidenheim Heideköpfe in semifinals, 2-3
2021	2	28	22	6	.786	Lost to Heidenheim Heideköpfe in semifinals, 2-3

== Euro League Baseball ==
Buchbinder Legionäre Regensburg was one of the three teams to start in the inaugural season of the Euro League Baseball.

2016 Euro League Baseball standings
Pos	Team	Pld	HW	HL	AW	AL	GB	PCT
1	Draci Brno	8	2	2	4	0	—	.750
2	Regensburg Legionäre	8	2	2	1	3	3	.375
3	Munich-Haar Disciples	8	2	2	1	3	3	.375
