= 2019 División de Honor de Béisbol =

2019 LNB season
- League: División de Honor
- Sport: Baseball
- Duration: March 23 – July 21 2019
- Number of games: 28
- Number of teams: 8
- Season champions: Tenerife Marlins

Seasons
- ← 2018 2020 →

The 2019 División de Honor de Béisbol was the 34th season of the top Spanish baseball league since its establishment and the 74th Spanish championship overall.

Tenerife Marlins successfully defended their title from the previous season for their 11th championship.

== Teams ==
División de Honor de Béisbol 2018 teams
Canary Islands

CD Pamplona did not compete this season.

| Team | Stadium | City/Area |
|---|---|---|
| Astros Valencia | Campo Federativo del Turia | Valencia |
| Barcelona | Camp Municipal Carlos Pérez de Rozas | Barcelona |
| Miralbueno | Campo Municipal de Miralbueno | Zaragoza |
| Navarra | Instalaciones Deportivas El Soto | Pamplona |
| San Inazio Bilbao Bizkaia | Polideportivo El Fango | Bilbao |
| Sant Boi | Campo Municipal de Béisbol | Sant Boi de Llobregat |
| Tenerife Marlins | Centro Insular de Béisbol | Puerto de la Cruz |
| Viladecans | Estadi Olimpic de Viladecans | Viladecans |

== League table ==
| Pos | Team | Pld | W | L | PCT |
|---|---|---|---|---|---|
| 1 | Tenerife Marlins (C) | 28 | 25 | 3 | .893 |
| 2 | San Inazio Bilbao Bizkaia | 28 | 20 | 8 | .714 |
| 3 | Astros Valencia | 28 | 19 | 9 | .679 |
| 4 | Barcelona | 28 | 16 | 12 | .571 |
| 5 | Viladecans | 28 | 15 | 13 | .536 |
| 6 | Sant Boi | 28 | 8 | 20 | .286 |
| 7 | Navarra | 28 | 7 | 21 | .250 |
| 8 | Miralbueno | 28 | 2 | 26 | .071 |

(C) Champions

2019 División de Honor winners
(Canary Islands)
Tenerife Marlins
Eleventh title
