= 2020 División de Honor de Béisbol =

2020 LNB season
- League: División de Honor
- Sport: Baseball
- Duration: TBA
- Games: 80
- Teams: 10

Seasons
- ← 2019 2021 →

The 2020 División de Honor de Béisbol will be the 35th season of the top Spanish baseball league since its establishment and the 75th Spanish championship overall. The start of the season was postponed due to coronavirus pandemic.

Tenerife Marlins are the defending champions.

== Teams ==
División de Honor de Béisbol 2020 teams
Canary Islands

Antorcha Valencia promoted to the league after finish the previous season as champion of Primera División (tier 2).

Team	Stadium	City/Area
Antorcha Valencia	Campo Federativo del Turia	Valencia
Astros Valencia	Campo Federativo del Turia	Valencia
Barcelona	Camp Municipal Carlos Pérez de Rozas	Barcelona
Miralbueno	Campo Municipal de Miralbueno	Zaragoza
Navarra	Instalaciones Deportivas El Soto	Pamplona
San Inazio Bilbao Bizkaia	Polideportivo El Fango	Bilbao
Sant Boi	Campo Municipal de Béisbol	Sant Boi de Llobregat
Tenerife Marlins	Centro Insular de Béisbol	Puerto de la Cruz
Viladecans	Estadi Olimpic de Viladecans	Viladecans

== League table ==
Pos	Team	Pld	W	L	PCT
1	Astros Valencia	18	17	1	.944
2	Tenerife Marlins	16	14	2	.875
3	San Inazio Bilbao Bizkaia	14	10	4	.714
4	Viladecans	18	12	6	.667
5	Barcelona	18	12	6	.667
6	Navarra	18	7	11	.389
7	Sant Boi	16	6	10	.375
8	Antorcha Valencia	18	3	15	.167
9	Miralbueno	18	3	15	.167
10	Rivas	18	2	16	.111
