= 2015 División de Honor de Béisbol =

División de Honor
- Season: 2015
- Champions: Tenerife Marlins
- Matches: 112

División de Honor de Béisbol 2015 is the 30th season since its establishment. 2015 season started on 28 March and finished on 12 July.

After the resign to play in the top league of El Llano BC, only eight teams played the Spanish baseball top league and there were not any relegations to Primera División. Tenerife Marlins re-conquered the title.

División de Honor de Béisbol 2016 teams
Canary Islands

Team	Stadium	Capacity	City/Area
Tenerife Marlins	Centro Insular de Béisbol	200	Puerto de la Cruz, Tenerife
Astros Valencia	Campo Federativo del Turia	100	Valencia
Sant Boi	Campo Municipal de Béisbol	500	Sant Boi de Llobregat
Barcelona	Camp Municipal Carlos Pérez de Rozas	800	Barcelona
San Inazio Bilbao Bizkaia	Polideportivo El Fango	200	Bilbao
Béisbol Navarra	Instalaciones Deportivas El Soto	200	Pamplona
Pamplona	Instalaciones Deportivas El Soto	200	Pamplona
Viladecans	Estadi Olimpic de Viladecans	1,500	Viladecans

== League table ==
#	Team	P	W	L	Pct.
1	Tenerife Marlins Puerto Cruz	28	24	4	.857
2	Astros Valencia	28	23	5	.821
3	Sant Boi	28	21	7	.750
4	CB Barcelona	28	13	15	.464
5	San Inazio Bilbao	28	11	17	.393
6	Béisbol Navarra	28	9	19	.321
7	Pamplona	28	8	20	.286
8	Viladecans	28	3	25	.107

2015 División de Honor winners
(Canary Islands)
Tenerife Marlins
Eighth title
