= 2016 División de Honor de Béisbol =

División de Honor
- Season: 2016
- Champions: Valencia Astros
- Matches: 112

División de Honor de Béisbol 2016 was the 31st season of the top Spanish baseball league since its establishment. It started on 2 April and finished on 31 July.

Valencia Astros achieved its first title.

== Teams ==
División de Honor de Béisbol 2016 teams
Canary Islands

Team	Stadium	Capacity	City/Area
Tenerife Marlins	Centro Insular de Béisbol	200	Puerto de la Cruz, Tenerife
Astros Valencia	Campo Federativo del Turia	100	Valencia
Sant Boi	Campo Municipal de Béisbol	500	Sant Boi de Llobregat
Barcelona	Camp Municipal Carlos Pérez de Rozas	800	Barcelona
San Inazio Bilbao Bizkaia	Polideportivo El Fango	200	Bilbao
Béisbol Navarra	Instalaciones Deportivas El Soto	200	Pamplona
Pamplona	Instalaciones Deportivas El Soto	200	Pamplona
Viladecans	Estadi Olimpic de Viladecans	1,500	Viladecans

== League table ==
Pos	Team	Pld	W	L	PCT	Qualification
1	Valencia Astros	28	24	4	.857	Champion
2	Marlins Puerto Cruz	28	24	4	.857	
3	Barcelona	28	17	11	.607	
4	Sant Boi	28	16	12	.571	
5	San Inazio Bizkaia	28	14	14	.500	
6	Navarra	28	8	20	.286	
7	Pamplona	28	7	21	.250	
8	Viladecans	28	2	26	.071	

2016 División de Honor winners
(Valencian Community)
Valencia Astros
First title
