= 2017 División de Honor de Béisbol =

División de Honor
- Season: 2017
- Champions: Tenerife Marlins
- Matches played: 112

The División de Honor de Béisbol 2017 was the 32nd season of the top Spanish baseball league since its establishment and the 72nd Spanish championship overall.

Tenerife Marlins achieved its ninth title.

== Teams ==
División de Honor de Béisbol 2016 teams
Canary Islands

Team	Stadium	City/Area
Tenerife Marlins	Centro Insular de Béisbol	Puerto de la Cruz, Tenerife
Astros Valencia	Campo Federativo del Turia	Valencia
Sant Boi	Campo Municipal de Béisbol	Sant Boi de Llobregat
Barcelona	Camp Municipal Carlos Pérez de Rozas	Barcelona
San Inazio Bilbao Bizkaia	Polideportivo El Fango	Bilbao
Navarra	Instalaciones Deportivas El Soto	Pamplona
Pamplona	Instalaciones Deportivas El Soto	Pamplona
Viladecans	Estadi Olimpic de Viladecans	Viladecans

== League table ==
Pos	Team	Pld	W	L	PCT	Qualification
1	Tenerife Marlins	28	22	6	.786	Champion
2	Astros Valencia	28	22	6	.786	
3	Sant Boi	28	21	7	.750	
4	Barcelona	28	17	11	.607	
5	San Inazio Bilbao Bizkaia	28	13	15	.464	
6	Pamplona	28	7	21	.250	
7	Viladecans	28	7	21	.250	
8	Navarra	28	3	25	.107	

2017 División de Honor winners
(Canary Islands)
Tenerife Marlins
Ninth title
