= 2018 División de Honor de Béisbol =

División de Honor
- Season: 2018
- Champions: Tenerife Marlins

The División de Honor de Béisbol 2018 was the 33rd season of the top Spanish baseball league since its establishment and the 73rd Spanish championship overall.

Tenerife Marlins achieved their tenth title.

== Teams ==
Miralbueno made their debut in the División de Honor.

División de Honor de Béisbol 2018 teams
Canary Islands

Team	Stadium	City/Area
Astros Valencia	Campo Federativo del Turia	Valencia
Barcelona	Camp Municipal Carlos Pérez de Rozas	Barcelona
Miralbueno	Campo Municipal de Miralbueno	Zaragoza
Navarra	Instalaciones Deportivas El Soto	Pamplona
Pamplona	Instalaciones Deportivas El Soto	Pamplona
San Inazio Bilbao Bizkaia	Polideportivo El Fango	Bilbao
Sant Boi	Campo Municipal de Béisbol	Sant Boi de Llobregat
Tenerife Marlins	Centro Insular de Béisbol	Puerto de la Cruz
Viladecans	Estadi Olimpic de Viladecans	Viladecans

== League table ==
Pos	Team	Pld	W	L	PCT
1	Tenerife Marlins (C)	32	29	3	.906
2	Astros Valencia	32	24	8	.750
3	San Inazio Bilbao Bizkaia	32	20	12	.625
4	Sant Boi	32	19	13	.594
5	Viladecans	32	17	15	.531
6	Barcelona	32	14	18	.438
7	Navarra	32	10	22	.313
8	Pamplona	32	10	22	.313
9	Miralbueno	32	1	31	.031

(C) Champions

2018 División de Honor winners
(Canary Islands)
Tenerife Marlins
Tenth title
