= 2012 División de Honor de Béisbol =

División de Honor
- Season: 2012
- Matches played: 180
- Biggest home win: Viladecans 26–0 Halcones; Round 16, July 7
- Biggest away win: Halcones 2–21 Pamplona; Round 10, May 19; Halcones 1–20 San Inazio; Round 13, June 9
- Highest scoring: Halonces 15–14 El Llano; Round 17, July 14

División de Honor de Béisbol 2012 is the 27th season since its establishment. 2012 season started on February 25.

El Llano BC was promoted from 1ª División and replaces relegated team Sevilla Red Sox. After FC Barcelona baseball team was disbanded, the players created a new team called Béisbol Barcelona.

The two first teams of the regular season will play a best-of-five series playoff for the title. The last team will be relegated to 1ª División.

== Regular season standings ==
#	Team	P	W	L	Pct.	R	RA	Qualification or relegation
1	Astros Valencia	36	32	4	.889	316	101	Final playoffs
2	Béisbol Barcelona	36	29	7	.806	274	92	Final playoffs
3	Tenerife Marlins Puerto Cruz	36	25	11	.694	239	153	
4	Viladecans	36	20	16	.556	250	159	
5	San Inazio Bilbao Bizkaia	36	19	17	.528	212	171	
6	Sant Boi	36	18	18	.500	201	182	
7	Béisbol Navarra	36	16	20	.444	197	178	
8	CD Pamplona	36	11	25	.306	150	255	
9	El Llano	36	8	28	.222	124	269	
10	Halcones de Vigo	36	2	34	.056	74	477	Relegated

=== Final playoffs ===
The regular season leader will play at home games number 3, 4 and 5.

Final playoffs
1	Valencia Astros	0	0	9	10
2	Béisbol Barcelona	1	10	4	15

2012 División de Honor winners
(Catalonia)
Béisbol Barcelona
First title
