= 2007 División de Honor de Béisbol =

División de Honor
- Season: 2007
- Champions: Marlins Puerto Cruz

The 2007 División de Honor de Béisbol was the 22nd season of the top Spanish baseball league since its establishment. It started in March 2007 and finished on 5 August.

Marlins Puerto Cruz achieved its third of five consecutive titles.

== Format ==
The twelve teams of the league were divided into two groups of six teams each. The first stage consisted in a double round-robin where the three first qualified teams of each group joined the Group 1 for the title and the rest of the teams the group 2 for avoiding relegation to Primera División.

In the second stage only are counted games against rivals of the same group.

== First stage ==
=== Group A ===
Pos	Team	Pld	W	L	PCT	Qualification
1	Marlins Puerto Cruz	20	20	0	1.000	Qualification to Group 1
2	Viladecans	20	12	8	.600	Qualification to Group 1
3	Amaya	20	11	9	.550	Qualification to Group 1
4	Hércules L'Hospitalet	20	8	12	.400	Qualification to Group 2
5	Arga	20	7	13	.350	Qualification to Group 2
6	Pamplona	20	2	18	.100	Qualification to Group 2

Source: RFEBS

=== Group B ===
Pos	Team	Pld	W	L	PCT	Qualification
1	FC Barcelona	20	14	6	.700	Qualification to Group 1
2	CBS Sant Boi (Note: One of the games between Sant Boi and Irabia was not played as it was considered unnecessary.)	19	12	7	.632	Qualification to Group 1
3	San Inazio	20	12	8	.600	Qualification to Group 1
4	El Llano	20	12	8	.600	Qualification to Group 2
5	Irabia	19	7	12	.368	Qualification to Group 2
6	Rivas CDEP	20	2	18	.100	Qualification to Group 2

Source: RFEBS

== First stage ==
=== Group A ===
Pos	Team	Pld	W	L	PCT	Qualification
1	Marlins Puerto Cruz	20	19	1	.950	Champion
2	FC Barcelona	20	15	5	.750	
3	CBS Sant Boi	20	10	10	.500	
4	Viladecans	20	7	13	.350	
5	San Inazio	20	6	14	.300	
6	Amaya	20	3	17	.150	

Source: RFEBS

=== Group B ===
Pos	Team	Pld	W	L	PCT	Relegation
1	El Llano	20	18	2	.900	
2	Hércules L'Hospitalet	20	13	7	.650	
3	Irabia	20	11	9	.550	
4	Arga	20	9	11	.450	
5	Pamplona	20	7	13	.350	Relegation to Primera División
6	Rivas CDEP	20	2	18	.100	Relegation to Primera División

Source: RFEBS

2016 División de Honor winners
(Canary Islands)
Tenerife Marlins
Third title
