= 2014 División de Honor de Béisbol =

División de Honor
- Season: 2014
- Champions: Tenerife Marlins
- Matches: 144
- Biggest home win: San Inazio 18–0 El Llano
- Biggest away win: Pamplona 0–19 San Inazio
- Highest scoring: Barcelona 15–19 Viladecans

División de Honor de Béisbol 2014 is the 29th season since its establishment. 2014 season started on March 15 and will finish on 3 August.

Only nine teams plays the Spanish baseball top league and no one will be relegated to Primera División. Tenerife Marlins are the defending champions.

== League table ==
| # | Team | P | W | L | Pct. |
|---|---|---|---|---|---|
| 1 | Tenerife Marlins Puerto Cruz | 32 | 26 | 2 | .923 |
| 2 | CBS Sant Boi | 32 | 23 | 9 | .719 |
| 3 | Astros Valencia | 32 | 21 | 11 | .656 |
| 4 | CB Barcelona | 32 | 20 | 12 | .625 |
| 5 | San Inazio Bilbao | 32 | 18 | 14 | .563 |
| 6 | CB Viladecans | 32 | 15 | 17 | .469 |
| 7 | Béisbol Navarra | 32 | 14 | 18 | .438 |
| 8 | CD Pamplona | 32 | 7 | 25 | .219 |
| 9 | El Llano BC | 32 | 0 | 32 | .000 |

2014 División de Honor winners
(Canary Islands)
Tenerife Marlins
7th title

| European Cup |

== Results ==
| | VLC | | NAV | | BAR | | SBO | | PAM | | LLA | | SIN | | TEN | | VIL | |
|---|---|---|---|---|---|---|---|---|---|---|---|---|---|---|---|---|---|---|
| Astros Valencia | | | 4–5 | 8–2 | 10–16 | 5–4 | 3–2 | 6–4 | 1–0 | 7–3 | 17–2 | 9–0 | 7–5 | 2–15 | 12–6 | 2–10 | 4–0 | 8–7 |
| Béisbol Navarra | 12–10 | 6–13 | | | 10–6 | 3–6 | 3–4 | 3–6 | 9–3 | 9–0 | 8–2 | 17–2 | 2–4 | 9–3 | 0–5 | 3–5 | 3–12 | 4–19 |
| CB Barcelona | 2–8 | 6–3 | 1–3 | 8–7 | | | 4–5 | 9–4 | 3–2 | 13–4 | 12–2 | 20–5 | 5–4 | 6–4 | 8–11 | 13–8 | 7–2 | 15–19 |
| CBS Sant Boi | 2–1 | 2–3 | 4–3 | 5–0 | 1–0 | 10–1 | | | 10–0 | 12–5 | 15–0 | 10–0 | 5–2 | 2–4 | 2–0 | 4–5 | 6–1 | 2–4 |
| CD Pamplona | 9–5 | 0–4 | 1–8 | 8–18 | 0–1 | 0–14 | 2–1 | 2–15 | | | 9–7 | 17–1 | 0–19 | 1–15 | 0–10 | 5–7 | 1–0 | 4–9 |
| El Llano BC | 2–14 | 0–13 | 1–16 | 5–18 | 0–17 | 0–16 | 0–14 | 4–19 | 3–11 | 1–11 | | | 1–21 | 0–22 | 0–15 | 1–18 | 1–18 | 5–8 |
| San Inazio Bilbao | 3–6 | 6–3 | 2–8 | 9–4 | 6–12 | 6–0 | 4–6 | 3–2 | 7–1 | 15–0 | 18–0 | 9–0 | | | 1–6 | 0–3 | 2–0 | 5–8 |
| Tenerife Marlins Puerto Cruz | 7–5 | 13–3 | 10–0 | 11–1 | 9–2 | 10–5 | 9–15 | 2–10 | 12–0 | 14–2 | 14–0 | 15–0 | 11–4 | 4–14 | | | 11–0 | 16–10 |
| CB Viladecans | 3–20 | 0–18 | 10–0 | 10–7 | 0–5 | 3–6 | 2–5 | 4–5 | 4–3 | 12–4 | 15–0 | 15–5 | 11–1 | 5–9 | 0–7 | 4–11 | | |
