= Jesús Golindano =

Venezuelan baseball player (born 1984)

- Infielder
- Born: January 13, 1984 (age 42); Maturin, Venezuela
- Bats: Right Throws: Right
- Stats at Baseball Reference

Jesus Enrique Golindano (born January 13, 1984) is a Venezuelan former professional baseball infielder.

== Career ==
Golindano was signed by the Los Angeles Dodgers as an undrafted free agent and played in the Venezuelan Summer League and Gulf Coast League while in the Dodgers system. Since 2004 he has played in the División de Honor de Béisbol, primarily with CB Barcelona.

He also is a member of the Spain national baseball team, participating in the 2008 European Cup, 2008 Final Four, 2011 European Cup and 2012 European Baseball Championship and 2013 World Baseball Classic.
