= Iván Granados =

Spanish, Venezuelan baseball player

- Pitcher
- Born: September 30, 1985 (age 41); San Carlos, Cojedes, Venezuela
- Bats: Left Throws: Left
- Stats at Baseball Reference

Iván Adam Granados (born September 30, 1985) is a Spanish-Venezuelan former professional baseball pitcher. He played for the Spain national team in the 2013 World Baseball Classic.

Granados played for the Arizona League team in the Oakland Athletics farm system in 2005 and 2006. He then joined the División de Honor de Béisbol in Spain in 2007. He played for the Tenerife Marlins from 2008 to 2010 and then joined the San Marino Baseball Club of the Italian Baseball League for 2011. In 2013 and 2014, he was a starting pitcher for HCAW in the Dutch Honkbal Hoofdklasse.

Granados debuted with the Spain national baseball team in 2007. He played in the 2007 Baseball World Cup, the 2008 European Cup, and the 2013 World Baseball Classic.
