= 2013 División de Honor de Béisbol =

División de Honor
- Season: 2013
- Champions: Tenerife Marlins
- European Cup: Tenerife Marlins
- Matches: 180
- Biggest home win: Barcelona 27–0 El Llano; Round 18
- Biggest away win: El Llano 0–23 San Inazio; Round 6
- Highest scoring: Marlins 18–13 Viladecans; Round 14

División de Honor de Béisbol 2013 is the 28th season since its establishment. 2013 season started on March 16 and finished on 4 August.

Only nine teams played the Spanish baseball top league after Halcones de Vigo was relegated to 1ª División A, and no team was promoted.

On July 22, Tenerife Marlins won its sixth title in a row.

== Regular season ==
#	Team	P	W	L	Pct.	R	RA
1	Tenerife Marlins Puerto Cruz	32	26	6	.813	209	126
2	CB Barcelona	32	25	7	.781	250	90
3	CBS Sant Boi	32	22	10	.688	179	105
4	San Inazio Bilbao	32	17	15	.531	154	109
5	Béisbol Navarra	32	16	16	.500	154	131
6	Viladecans	32	15	17	.469	147	168
7	Astros Valencia	32	13	19	.406	97	86
8	CD Pamplona	32	7	25	.219	94	203
9	El Llano BC	32	3	29	.094	47	299

2013 División de Honor winners
(Canary Islands)
Tenerife Marlins
Sixth title
