= Anthony Vizcaya =

Venezuelan baseball player (born 1993)

Free agent
- Pitcher
- Born: October 24, 1993 (age 32); Barquisimeto, Venezuela
- Bats: Right Throws: Right
- Stats at Baseball Reference

Anthony Karl Vizcaya Freitez (born October 24, 1993) is a Venezuelan professional baseball pitcher who is a free agent. He has previously played in the minor leagues, as well as for Navegantes del Magallanes and Cardenales de Lara in the Venezuelan Winter League. Vizcaya was selected to the Venezuela national baseball team at the 2023 World Baseball Classic and the 2024 WBSC Premier12.

== Professional career ==
=== Cleveland Indians ===
On March 5, 2013, Vizcaya signed with the Cleveland Indians organization as an international free agent. He made his professional debut with the Dominican Summer League Indians, working to a 0.94 earned run average (ERA) over 12 starts. In 2013, he was promoted to the Arizona Complex League, finishing with 6.88 ERA. The next year, he played in 15 games with the Mahoning Valley Scrappers of the Low-A New York–Penn League; after accruing a 1—6 record and a 10.64 ERA with Mahoning Valley in 2014, the Indians released Vizcaya.

Vizcaya played with CB Sant Boi in Spain's División de Honor de Béisbol in 2017, leading the league in ERA (0.89) and earning an 11–2 record. In 2018, he played for a team in Japanese independent leagues.

=== Minnesota Twins ===
On January 20, 2019, Vizcaya signed a minor league contract with the Minnesota Twins. He was assigned to the High-A Fort Myers Miracle, and was quickly promoted to the Double-A Pensacola Blue Wahoos, where he worked to a 0.78 ERA over 26 games. Vizcaya elected free agency following the season on November 4.

On January 19, 2020, Vizcaya signed a minor league contract with the Los Angeles Dodgers organization; however, he did not play that year, due to roster cuts stemming from the COVID-19 pandemic.

=== Rieleros de Aguascalientes ===
On February 12, 2021, Vizcaya signed with the Rieleros de Aguascalientes of the Mexican League. Over 38 1/3 innings pitched in 22 games, he logged a 7-2 record and 4.93 ERA. On June 23, 2021, in a game against the Toros de Tijuana, Vizcaya hit Toros batter José Guadalupe Chávez, kicking off a massive brawl between the two opposing benches; 10 players were fined due to the altercation, although Vizcaya was not one of them.

=== New York Mets ===
Vizcaya signed a minor league deal with the New York Mets on February 9, 2022. In ten games for the Triple-A Syracuse Mets, he worked to a 6.08 ERA. The Mets released Vizcaya on May 29.

Vizcaya returned to the Rieleros after being released by the Mets. He recorded an 8.00 ERA over 18 innings in as many games.

=== Tecolotes de los Dos Laredos ===
On March 30, 2023, the Tecolotes de los Dos Laredos of the Mexican League signed Vizcaya. That year, his performance was much improved, working to a 3.68 ERA in 58 appearances for the club.

=== Atlanta Braves ===
On January 25, 2024, Vizcaya signed with the Atlanta Braves on a minor league contract, the fifth major league organization in his career. With the Double-A Mississippi Braves, he posted a 4.67 ERA over 22 games. Despite a brief stint with the Triple-A Gwinnett Stripers, he was released by the Braves on August 2.

=== Tecolotes de los Dos Laredos (second stint) ===
On January 23, 2025, Vizcaya signed a new contract with the Tecolotes. Vizcaya made 50 appearances for Dos Laredos, compiling a 2-3 record and 6.00 ERA with 44 strikeouts and two saves over 45 innings of work.

=== Conspiradores de Querétaro ===
On February 9, 2026, Vizcaya and Drew Strotman were traded to the Conspiradores de Querétaro of the Mexican League. In three relief appearances, he posted a 7.71 ERA, giving up two runs in 2 1/3 innings of work. On April 22, Vizcaya was released by Querétaro.

=== Charros de Jalisco ===
On May 8, 2026, Vizcaya signed with the Charros de Jalisco of the Mexican League. In two relief appearances for the Charros, he gave up three earned runs over 2 2/3 innings of work. Vizcaya was released by Jalisco on May 20.

== International career ==
Vizcaya played with Venezuela at the 2019 WBSC Premier12. In just 1/3 innings pitched, he allowed 4 earned runs in a Super Round game against the United States, taking the loss in the 6–5 defeat.

Vizcaya was selected to the roster of the Venezuela national baseball team for the 2023 World Baseball Classic as a reserve player; he played in exhibition games with the national team, but did not take the mound during the tournament.

At the 2024 WBSC Premier12, Vizcaya appeared in 4 games, tossing two innings and allowing two walks and four earned runs.
