= 2010 División de Honor de Béisbol =

Spanish baseball league season

In the 2010 season, the División de Honor de Béisbol – the top-tier league of baseball in Spain – was won by the team from Sant Boi de Llobregat, Catalonia.

== Final standings ==
División de Honor
Team	Pld	W	L	Runs+	Runs-	AVE
Sant Boi (Sant Boi)	36	33	3	315	56	917
Barcelona (Barcelona)	36	31	5	333	93	861
Marlins (Puerto de la Cruz)	36	28	8	301	93	778
Navarra (Pamplona)	36	23	13	222	143	639
San Inazio (Bilbao)	36	18	18	198	189	500
Astros (Valencia)	36	16	20	224	246	444
CB Viladecans (Viladecans)	36	15	21	197	216	417
Halcones (Vigo)	36	9	27	105	263	250
Pamplona (Pamplona)	36	6	30	139	322	167
El Llano BC (Gijón)	36	1	35	58	471	28

2010 champions: Sant Boi

The top four teams played in a final four for the Copa de su Majestad el Rey Beisbol 2010 with the Tenerife Marlins Puerto Cruz winning the Spanish cup. The champion and the cupwinner qualified for the European Cup.
