= 2012 Final Four (baseball) =

Tournament details
- Country: Italy
- Dates: 29 August – 30 August
- Teams: 4
- Defending champions: T&A San Marino

Final positions
- Champions: (Italy) Fortitudo Bologna (2nd title)
- Runners-up: (Italy) Caffè Danesi Nettuno
- Third place: (Netherlands) L&D Amsterdam
- Fourth place: (France) Rouen Huskies

Tournament statistics
- Games played: 4
- Attendance: 8,050 (2,013 per game)

The 2012 European Champion Cup Final Four was an international baseball competition being held in Nettuno, Italy on August 29–30, 2012. It featured the 4 best teams of the 2012 European Cup.

== Teams ==
The following four teams qualified for the 2012 Final Four.

(Italy); Caffè Danesi Nettuno	Qualified as #1 in Rotterdam
(Italy); Fortitudo Bologna	Qualified as #1 in San Marino
(Netherlands); L&D Amsterdam	Qualified as #2 in San Marino
(France); Rouen Huskies	Qualified as #2 in Rotterdam

== Schedule and results ==
August 29, 2012; 16:00	Fortitudo Bologna (Italy)	4 – 0	(France) Rouen Huskies	Stadio Steno Borghese, Nettuno, Italy; Attendance: 350
August 29, 2012; 16:00		Boxscore		Stadio Steno Borghese, Nettuno, Italy; Attendance: 350

August 29, 2012; 21:00	Caffè Danesi Nettuno (Italy)	1 – 0	(Netherlands) L&D Amsterdam	Stadio Steno Borghese, Nettuno, Italy; Attendance: 3,000
August 29, 2012; 21:00		Boxscore		Stadio Steno Borghese, Nettuno, Italy; Attendance: 3,000

August 30, 2012; 16:00	Rouen Huskies (France)	7 – 8	(Netherlands) L&D Amsterdam	Stadio Steno Borghese, Nettuno, Italy; Attendance: 200
August 30, 2012; 16:00		Boxscore		Stadio Steno Borghese, Nettuno, Italy; Attendance: 200

August 30, 2012; 21:00	Fortitudo Bologna (Italy)	4 – 3	(Italy) Caffè Danesi Nettuno	Stadio Steno Borghese, Nettuno, Italy; Attendance: 4,500
August 30, 2012; 21:00		Boxscore		Stadio Steno Borghese, Nettuno, Italy; Attendance: 4,500
