= European Champion Cup Final Four =

Post-season baseball tournament

- Most recent season or competition: 2012 Final Four (baseball)
- Sport: Baseball
- Founded: 2008
- No. of teams: 4
- Continent: Europe
- Most recent champion: (Italy) Bologna
- Most titles: (Italy) Bologna (Italy) Nettuno

The "Final Four" (also called European Champion Cup) is a post-season baseball tournament sanctioned and created by the Confederation of European Baseball (CEB). The tournament features the four best teams in the two European Cups. The champion later represents Europe in the Asia Series.

The most recent edition of the tournament was held in Nettuno, Italy on August 29–30, 2012.

== Results ==
Year	Final Host	Final			Semifinalists	
Year	Final Host	Champions	Score	Runners-up	3rd place	4th place
2008; Details	(Spain); Barcelona	(Italy); Nettuno	3–2	San Marino	(Italy); Grosseto	(Spain); Barcelona
2009; Details	(Spain); Barcelona	(Italy); Nettuno	1–0	(Italy); Bologna	(Netherlands); Haarlem	(Netherlands); Amsterdam
2010; Details	(Spain); Barcelona	(Italy); Bologna	2–1	(Germany); Heidenheim	(Italy); Rimini	San Marino
2011; Details	(Czech Republic); Brno	San Marino	7–1	(Italy); Parma	(Italy); Bologna	(Netherlands); Amsterdam
2012; Details	(Italy); Nettuno	(Italy); Bologna	4–3	(Italy); Nettuno	(Netherlands); Amsterdam	(France); Rouen

== Medal table ==
Rank	Team	Gold	Silver	Bronze	Total
1	(Italy) Bologna	2	1	1	4
2	(Italy) Nettuno	2	1	0	3
3	San Marino	1	1	0	2
4	(Germany) Heidenheim	0	1	0	1
5	(Netherlands) Amsterdam	0	0	1	1
5	(Italy) Grosseto	0	0	1	1
5	(Netherlands) Haarlem	0	0	1	1
5	(Italy) Rimini	0	0	1	1
Totals (8 entries)		5	4	5	14

== Medals (2008-2012) ==
Rank	Nation	Gold	Silver	Bronze	Total
1	Italy	4	3	3	10
2	San Marino	1	1	0	2
3	Germany	0	1	0	1
4	Netherlands	0	0	2	2
Totals (4 entries)		5	5	5	15

== See also ==
- European Baseball Championship
- Baseball awards § Europe
