= Félix Manuel Cano =

Spanish baseball player (born 1966)

Félix Cano

CB Viladecans
- Pitcher / First baseman / Coach
- Born: 26 April 1966 (age 59); Viladecans, Catalonia, Spain
Medals
Men's baseball
Representing Spain
European Baseball Championship
Bronze medal – third place	1987 Spain	National team
Bronze medal – third place	1989 France	National team
Bronze medal – third place	1991 Italy	National team
Bronze medal – third place	1997 France	National team
Bronze medal – third place	2005 Czech Republic	National team
Bronze medal – third place	2007 Spain	National team

Félix Manuel Cano Ridruejo (born 26 April 1966) is a former Spanish baseball pitcher and first baseman with CB Viladecans and the Spanish national baseball team, where he had a total of 122 appearances. He played for Spain at the 1992 Summer Olympics.
