= 2011 Final Four (baseball) =

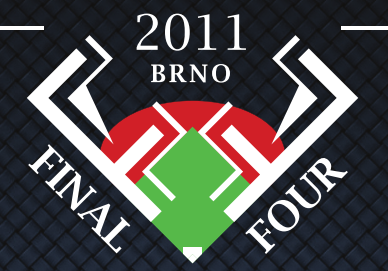
- Official logo

Tournament details
- Country: Czech Republic
- Dates: 21 September – 22 September
- Teams: 4
- Defending champions: (Italy) Bologna

Final positions
- Champions: T&A San Marino (1st title)
- Runners-up: (Italy) ASD Parma
- Third place: (Italy) Bologna
- Fourth place: (Netherlands) Amsterdam

Tournament statistics
- Games played: 4
- Attendance: 1,525 (381 per game)

The 2011 European Champion Cup Final Four was an international baseball competition held in Brno, Czech Republic on September 21–22, 2011. It featured the 4 best teams of the 2011 European Cup.

== Teams ==
The following four teams qualified for the 2011 Final Four.

(Italy); ASD Parma	Qualified as #2 in Parma
(Netherlands); L&D Amsterdam	Qualified as #2 in Amsterdam
T&A San Marino	Qualified as #1 in Parma
(Italy); Unipol Bologna	Qualified as #1 in Amsterdam

== Schedule and results ==
September 21, 2011; 13:00	T&A San Marino	1 – 0 (F/10)	(Netherlands) L&D Amsterdam	Draci Brno Baseball Stadium, Czech Republic; Attendance: 750
September 21, 2011; 13:00		Boxscore		Draci Brno Baseball Stadium, Czech Republic; Attendance: 750

September 21, 2011; 18:00	Unipol Bologna (Italy)	2 – 3	(Italy) ASD Parma	Draci Brno Baseball Stadium, Czech Republic; Attendance: 200
September 21, 2011; 18:00		Boxscore		Draci Brno Baseball Stadium, Czech Republic; Attendance: 200

September 22, 2011; 13:00	Unipol Bologna (Italy)	10 – 9	(Netherlands) L&D Amsterdam	Draci Brno Baseball Stadium, Czech Republic; Attendance: 250
September 22, 2011; 13:00		Boxscore		Draci Brno Baseball Stadium, Czech Republic; Attendance: 250

September 22, 2011; 18:00	T&A San Marino	7 – 1	(Italy) ASD Parma	Draci Brno Baseball Stadium, Czech Republic; Attendance: 325
September 22, 2011; 18:00		Boxscore		Draci Brno Baseball Stadium, Czech Republic; Attendance: 325
