= Enrique Cortés Pes =

Spanish baseball player (born 1966)

- Shortstop
- Born: 29 November 1966 (age 58); Viladecans, Spain

Enrique Cortés Pes
Medal record

Men's baseball

Representing Spain

European Baseball Championship
Bronze medal – third place	1987 Spain	National team
Bronze medal – third place	1989 France	National team
Bronze medal – third place	1991 Italy	National team
Bronze medal – third place	1997 France	National team

Enrique Cortés Pes Gallego (born 29 November 1966 in Viladecans, Barcelona) is a former Spanish baseball player. He played with Spain at the 1992 Summer Olympics. He had 1 hit in 11 at-bats over 6 games, all losses for Spain.
