= 2012 Final Four =

2012 Final Four may refer to:

- 2012 NCAA Men's Division I Basketball Tournament
- 2012 NCAA Women's Division I Basketball Tournament
- 2012 Final Four (baseball)
