= 2008 División de Honor de Béisbol =

This article is about División de Honor de Beisbol 2008, the 2008 was the 65th edition, the season started on 29 March and finished on 10 August 2008. The División de Honor champion was Marlins de Puerto Cruz and the Copa del Rey champion was El Llano Béisbol Club.

The Marlins de Puerto Cruz won their fourth of five consecutive titles.

== Final standings ==
División de Honor
Place	Team	Website	Played	Won	Lost
1	Marlins de Puerto Cruz		32	27	5
2	FC Barcelona		32	25	7
3	Sant Boi		32	24	8
4	El Llano		32	20	12
5	San Inazio		32	16	16
6	Béisbol Navarra		32	15	17
7	Viladecans		32	11	21
8	Pamplona		32	6	26
9	Astros		32	0	32

== Copa del Rey 2008 ==
COPA DEL REY 2008
Place	Team	Played	Wins	Losts	Runs for	Runs against	AVE
1	El Llano BC	2	2	0	17	14	1000
2	CB Viladecans	2	1	1	8	8	500
3	CBS Sant Boi	2	1	1	7	7	500
4	Béisbol Navarra	2	0	2	13	16	0
