= El Llano BC =

Spanish baseball and softball team

El Llano Béisbol Club
- Logo

Information
- League: 1ª División
- Location: Casa del Deporte de El Llano. Avda. de El Llano, 69, 1º. Gijón 33209
- Ballpark: Campo Municipal de Béisbol
- Founded: 1986
- Post-season championships: 1 Copa del Rey
- League championships: 0
- 2014: 0–32, 9th
- Colors: Green, Gold, Grey & White
- Management: Roberto Díaz
- Manager: Carlos Lopez "Papi"

Current uniforms
Home	Away

El Llano Béisbol Club (El Llano Baseball Club in English language) is a baseball and softball team in the Spanish baseball league. Founded in 1986, the club is based at the El LLano, a neighbourhood of the city of Gijón in Asturias.

== History ==
The team has been competing at the top level of the Spanish leagues, the División de Honor, since 2002, when they promoted from Primera División A, except for the 2011 season, when they played at the Primera División A again.

Best performances were turned out in 2008, when they placed 4th overall and won the King's Cup (Copa del Rey).

After being relegated to Primera División A in 2010, El Llano came back immediately to División de Honor, where it played from 2012 and 2014, when the club resigned to the category due to the financial trouble of the last years.

In 2018, El Llano created the softball section and started competing by playing the Liga Ibérica, a friendly tournament played with teams from Spain and Portugal.

== Trophies ==
- Copa del Rey: 1
  - 2008

== Season by season ==
Year	Tier	League	Pos	W	L	Copa del Rey
2000	2	1ª División A	2nd	13	4	
2001	2	1ª División A				
2002	2	1ª División A	1st	18	6	
2003	1	Div. Honor	8th	20	20	
2004	1	Div. Honor	8th	13	19	
2005	1	Div. Honor	10th			Played
2006	1	Div. Honor	7th			5th position
2007	1	Div. Honor	7th	23	9	6th position
2008	1	Div. Honor	4th	20	12	Champion
2009	1	Div. Honor	7th	16	20	
2010	1	Div. Honor	10th	1	35	
2011	2	1ª División	2nd	17	3	
2012	1	Div. Honor	9th	8	28	
2013	1	Div. Honor	9th	3	29	
2014	1	Div. Honor	9th	0	32	
2015	2	1ª División	5th	4th	7	
2016	2	1ª División	1st	7	1	
2017	2	1ª División	4th	5	7	
2018	2	1ª División	5th	3	7	
2019	2	1ª División	5th	4	6	
