= 2009 Final Four (baseball) =

Tournament details
- Country: Spain
- Dates: 20 June - 21 June
- Teams: 4
- Defending champions: (Italy) Nettuno

Final positions
- Champions: (Italy) Nettuno (2nd title)
- Runners-up: (Italy) Bologna
- Third place: (Netherlands) Haarlem
- Fourth place: (Netherlands) Amsterdam

The 2009 "Final Four" was an international baseball competition held in Barcelona, Spain, on June 20–21, 2009, between four teams from the professional leagues in Italy and the Netherlands.

Caffè Danesi Nettuno from Nettuno, Italy won its second straight title.

== Game results ==
=== Semi-finals ===
Team	1	2	3	4	5	6	7	8	9	R	H	E
(Italy) Bologna	0	2	0	0	0	0	0	3	1	6	9	0
(Netherlands) Amsterdam	0	0	0	0	0	0	0	0	0	0	5	1

Team	1	2	3	4	5	6	7	8	9	R	H	E
(Italy) Nettuno	0	0	0	0	0	2	4	0	0	6	8	2
(Netherlands) Haarlem	0	0	0	0	0	4	0	0	0	4	7	1

=== 3rd place ===
Team	1	2	3	4	5	6	7	8	9	10	R	H	E
(Netherlands) Haarlem	0	0	0	0	0	0	0	1	0	2	3	8	1
(Netherlands) Amsterdam	0	0	1	0	0	0	0	0	0	0	1	8	1

=== Final ===
Team	1	2	3	4	5	6	7	8	9	R	H	E
(Italy) Nettuno	0	1	0	0	0	0	0	0	0	1	5	0
(Italy) Bologna	0	0	0	0	0	0	0	0	0	0	5	1

== Final standings ==
Rk	Team
1	(Italy) Nettuno
Lost in final
2	(Italy) Bologna
Failed to qualify for the Final
3	(Netherlands) Haarlem
4	(Netherlands) Amsterdam

2009 European Champion

Nettuno
2nd title
