= CEB Cup =

European baseball tournament

Baseball European Cup
- Sport: Baseball
- Founded: 1993
- No. of teams: 8 (in 2026)
- Continent: Europe

The Baseball European Cup, formerly called the Confederation Cup and CEB Cup, is an annual baseball tournament, sanctioned and created by WBSC Europe. The tournament is the second-tier tournament for baseball leagues across Europe, alongside the first-tier European Champions Cup, third-tier Federation Cup, and fourth-tier Federation Cup Qualifiers, all of which operate with a promotion and relegation system for its federations.

The inaugural season of the tournament was held in 2016 in Rouen, France, and Chartres, France. FC Barcelona won the last edition(2007) beating Heidenheim Heideköpfe 13-9. After that no tournament was held between 2008 and 2015 then in 2016 the tournament returned.

== Current teams ==
=== 2026 European Cup ===
Team
(Belgium) Borgerhout Squirrels
(Austria) Diving Ducks
(Austria) Dornbirn Indians
(Slovenia) Kranjski Lisjaki
(England) London Mets
(Sweden) Rättviks
(Sweden) Sundbybergs
(Switzerland) Therwil Flyers

== Results ==
Year	Host	Medalists		
Year	Host	Champions	Runners-up	3rd place
1993	Italy	(Italy); Nettuno Baseball Club	(Italy); Fortitudo Baseball Bologna	(Spain); CAD Irabia Pamplona
1994	France	(Italy); Rimini Baseball Club	(Spain); CAD Irabia	(France); Nice Université Club
1995	Italy	(Italy); Nettuno Baseball Club	(Netherlands); HCAW	(Spain); CAD Irabia Pamplona
1996	Italy	(Italy); Juventus 48 Torino	(Italy); CB Caserta	(Czech Republic); Kovo Mac Source
1997	Spain	(Italy); BBC Grosseto	(Russia); CSKA PVO Balashikha	(Spain); CAD Irabia Pamplona
1998	Russia	(Italy); Modena Baseball Club	(France); Lions de Savigny-sur-Orge	(Spain); CAD Irabia Pamplona
1999	Spain	(Italy); Modena Baseball Club	(Spain); CAD Irabia Pamplona	(Hungary); Szentendre Sleepwalkers
2000	Italy	(Italy); Nettuno Baseball Club	(Italy); Modena Baseball Club	(France); Montpellier Université Club Baseball
2001	France	(Czech Republic); Technika Brno	(France); Lions de Savigny-sur-Orge	(Germany); Cologne Dodgers
2002	Spain	(Czech Republic); Sokol KRC Praha	(Sweden); Oskarshamn BSK	(France); Paris Université Club
2003	Croatia	(Germany); Cologne Dodgers	(Croatia); Kelteks Karlovac	(Spain); Rojos de Candelaria
2004	Germany	(Spain); Marlins Puerto de la Cruz CBS	(Germany); Solingen Alligators	(Sweden); Tranås BK
2005	Czech Republic	(Croatia); Zagreb BC	(Spain); Marlins Puerto de la Cruz CBS	(Germany); Fürth Pirates
2006	Spain	(Croatia); Kelteks Karlovac	(Germany); Solingen Alligators	(France); Sénart Templiers
2007	(Croatia); Karlovac	(Spain); FC Barcelona	(Germany); Heidenheim Heideköpfe	(France); Tigers de Toulouse
2016; Details	(France); Rouen/Chartres	(France); Huskies de Rouen	(France); Barracudas de Montpellier	(Croatia); Olimpija Karlovac
2017; Details	(Czech Republic); Prague/Brno	(Czech Republic); Draci Brno	(Czech Republic); Eagles Praha	(France); Templiers de Sénart
2018; Details	(Czech Republic); Ostrava/Frýdek-Místek	(Belgium); Borgerhout Squirrels	(Germany); Bonn Capitals	(Czech Republic); Ostrava Arrows
2019; Details	(Czech Republic); Brno	(Germany); Heidenheim Heideköpfe	(Czech Republic); Draci Brno	(France); Cougars de Montigny
2021; Details	(France); Lieusaint	(Czech Republic); Draci Brno	(France); Sénart Templiers	(Spain); Astros Valencia
2022; Details	(France); Rouen	(France); Huskies de Rouen	(Belgium); Hoboken Pioneers	(Spain); Tenerife Marlins
2023; Details	(Croatia); Karlovac	(Spain); Tenerife Marlins	(France); Lions de Savigny-sur-Orge	(Spain); Astros Valencia
2024; Details	(Spain); Valencia	(Spain); Tenerife Marlins	(Croatia); Olimpija Karlovac	(Spain); Astros Valencia
2025; Details	(France); Rouen	(Spain); Tenerife Marlins	(France); Barracudas de Montpellier	(France); Huskies de Rouen
2026; Details	(Austria); Wiener Neustadt	(Slovenia); Kranjski Lisjaki	(Sweden); Rättvik Butchers	(Switzerland); Therwil Flyers
2027; Details	(Slovakia); Bratislava			

=== Titles by team ===
Team	Number of championships	Years
(Spain) Tenerife Marlins	3	2023, 2024, 2025
(Czech Republic) Draci Brno	2	2017, 2021
(France) Huskies de Rouen	2	2016, 2022
(Belgium) Borgerhout Squirrels	1	2018
(Germany) Heidenheim Heideköpfe	1	2019
(Slovenia) Kranjski Lisjaki	1	2026

== Medals (1993-2023) ==
Rank	Nation	Gold	Silver	Bronze	Total
1	Italy	8	4	0	12
2	Spain	5	3	8	16
3	Czech Republic	4	2	1	7
4	France	2	6	9	17
5	Germany	2	4	2	8
6	Croatia	2	1	1	4
7	Belgium	1	1	0	2
8	Netherlands	0	1	1	2
8	Russia	0	1	1	2
10	Sweden	0	1	0	1
11	Hungary	0	0	1	1
Totals (11 entries)		24	24	24	72

== See also ==
- European Baseball Championship
- Asia Series
- Caribbean Series
- Baseball awards § Europe
