= Joe Ryan (baseball) =

American baseball player (born 1996)

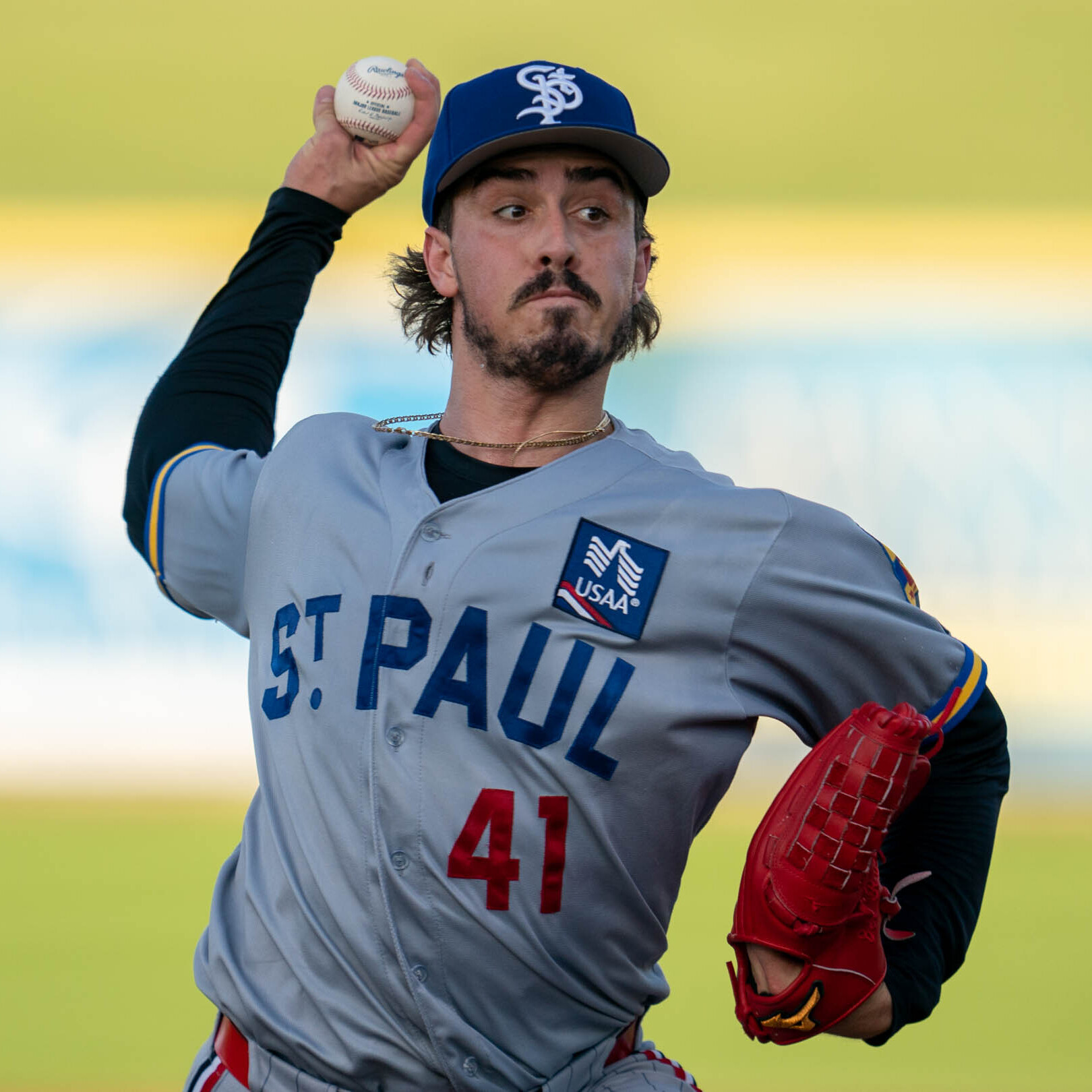
- Ryan with the St. Paul Saints in 2026

Minnesota Twins – No. 41
- Pitcher
- Born: June 5, 1996 (age 30); San Francisco, California, U.S.
- Bats: Right Throws: Right

MLB debut
- September 1, 2021, for the Minnesota Twins

MLB statistics (through 2026 season)
- Win–loss record: 53–46
- Earned run average: 3.79
- Strikeouts: 878
- Stats at Baseball Reference

Teams
- Minnesota Twins (2021–present)

Career highlights and awards
- 2× All-Star (2025, 2026)
Medals
Men's baseball
Representing United States
Olympic Games
Silver medal – second place	2020 Tokyo	Team
World Baseball Classic
Silver medal – second place	2026 Miami	Team

Joseph Philip Ryan (born June 5, 1996) is an American professional baseball pitcher for the Minnesota Twins of Major League Baseball (MLB). He was drafted by the Tampa Bay Rays in the seventh round of the 2018 MLB draft and made his MLB debut with the Twins in 2021. In 2025 and 2026, Ryan was named to his first two All-Star games.

== Amateur career ==
Ryan attended Sir Francis Drake High School in San Anselmo, California. He was drafted by the San Francisco Giants in the 39th round of the 2014 Major League Baseball draft, but did not sign and played college baseball at California State University, Northridge. In 2015 and 2016, he played collegiate summer baseball with the Orleans Firebirds of the Cape Cod Baseball League, and was named a league all-star in 2016. In 2018, he transferred to California State University, Stanislaus.

== Professional career ==
=== Tampa Bay Rays ===
The Tampa Bay Rays drafted Ryan in the seventh round, as the 210th overall pick of the 2018 MLB draft, and he signed. Ryan made his professional debut with the Hudson Valley Renegades, compiling a 2–1 record with a 3.72 ERA over 36 1/3 innings.

Ryan started 2019 with the Bowling Green Hot Rods and was promoted to the Charlotte Stone Crabs and Montgomery Biscuits during the season. Over 24 games (22 starts) between the three clubs, Ryan pitched to a 9–4 record with a 1.96 ERA, striking out 183 batters over 123 2/3 innings.

Ryan did not play in a game in 2020 due to the cancellation of the minor league season because of the COVID-19 pandemic. Ryan was assigned to the Triple-A Durham Bulls to begin the 2021 season, and logged a 4–3 record and 3.63 ERA in 12 appearances, 11 of them starts.

=== Minnesota Twins ===
On July 22, 2021, while Ryan was in Tokyo competing in the 2020 Summer Olympics, he was traded with Drew Strotman to the Minnesota Twins for Nelson Cruz and Calvin Faucher. After making 2 starts for the Triple-A St. Paul Saints, posting an ERA of 2.00 with 17 strikeouts, the Twins selected Ryan's contract when the rosters expanded. Ryan made his MLB debut on September 1, 2021, starting against the Chicago Cubs. He pitched 5 innings, gave up 3 runs, and struck out 5 batters.

On April 1, 2022, manager Rocco Baldelli announced that Ryan would be the 2022 Opening Day starting pitcher and start his first career Opening Day against the Seattle Mariners. Despite missing a month due to injury, Ryan had a career year as he led the team in wins (13), strikeouts (151) and innings pitched (147). In the 2023 season, Ryan took a step back from his performance the year before. Despite striking out 197 in 161 2/3 innings, he allowed 32 home runs and his ERA grew a run higher (4.51).

Ryan's pitching motion

Ryan began the 2024 campaign in Minnesota's starting rotation. In 23 starts with the team, he had a 7–7 record and 3.60 ERA with 147 strikeouts over 135 innings pitched. Ryan was placed on the injured list with a right shoulder strain on August 9, 2024. He was transferred to the 60-day injured list on August 27, ending his season.

== International career ==
In May 2021, Ryan was named to the roster of the United States national baseball team for qualifying for baseball at the 2020 Summer Olympics. After the team qualified, he was named to the Olympics roster on July 2. Ryan made two starts at the Olympics, pitching to a 1.74 ERA over 10 1/3 innings. He went six innings in a group stage win against Israel and left with a no-decision in the semifinal game against South Korea. The U.S. won the silver medal, losing to Japan in the gold-medal game.

Ryan was named to the United States roster for the 2026 World Baseball Classic. However, due to back inflammation, he was replaced by Ryan Yarbrough a week before the start of the pool stage; Ryan was retained as part of the team's designated pitcher pool, making him eligible to pitch for the US in the knockout stage of the tournament.
