= Stadio Steno Borghese =

Baseball stadium in Nettuno, Italy

Coordinates: 41°28′8″N 12°40′49″E

- Stadio di Baseball di Nettuno
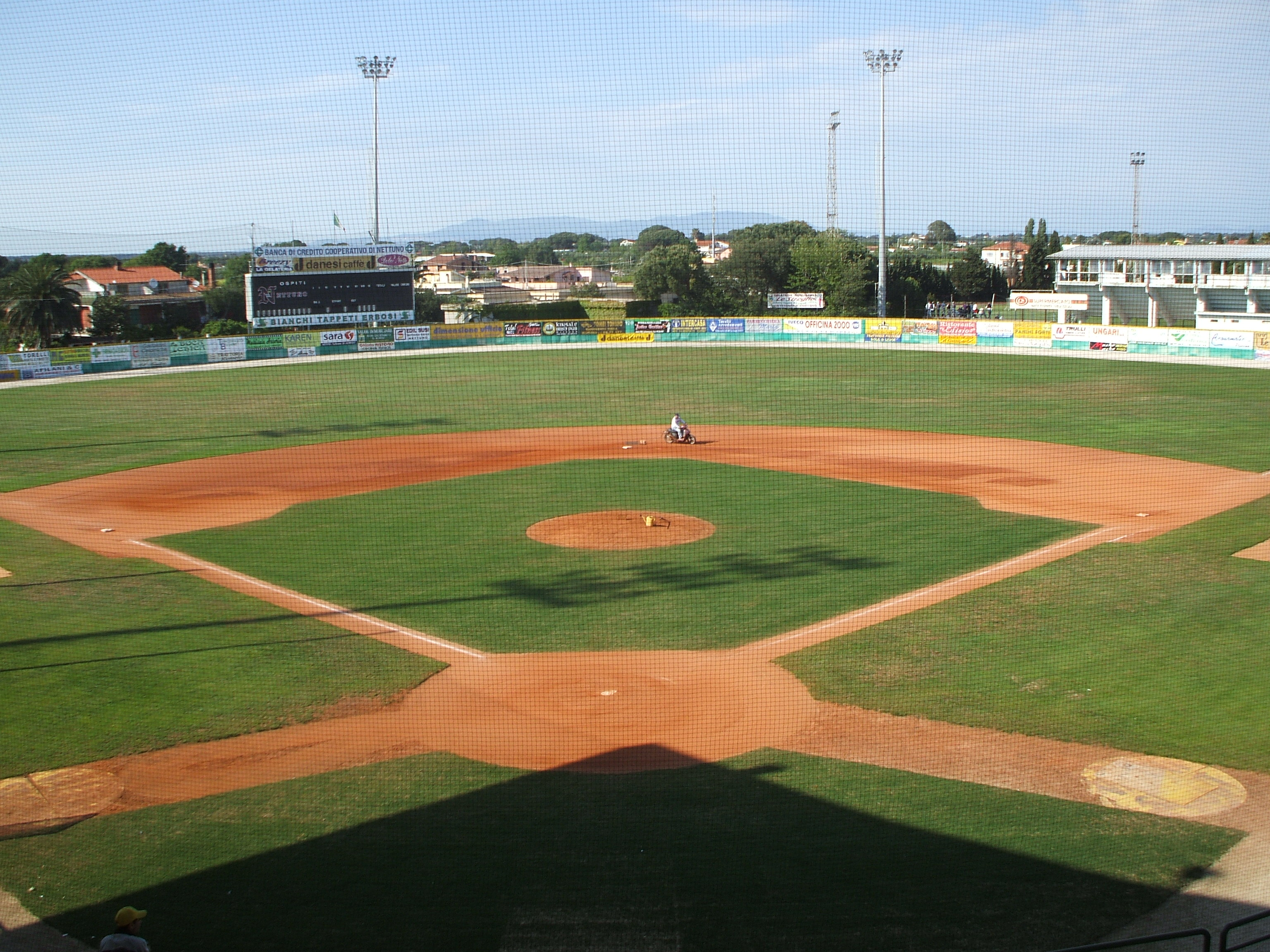
- Interactive map of Stadio Steno Borghese
- Location: Via Scipione Borghese; Nettuno, 00048
- Owner: Municipalità di Nettuno
- Capacity: 8,000
- Field size: Left Field Line – 100m Center Field – 120m Right Field Line – 100m

Construction
- Opened: 1991

Tenants
- Caffè Danesi Nettuno (Italian Baseball League)

Stadio Steno Borghese is a baseball stadium located in Nettuno, Italy. It was built in 1991.

== See also ==
- 2009 Baseball World Cup
