= 2008 Final Four (baseball) =

Tournament details
- Country: Spain
- Dates: 14 September - 15 September
- Teams: 4

Final positions
- Champions: (Italy) Nettuno
- Runners-up: San Marino
- Third place: (Italy) Grosseto
- Fourth place: (Spain) Barcelona

The 2008 "Final Four" was an international baseball competition held in Barcelona, Spain on September 14–15, 2008. It featured 4 teams from the professional leagues in Italy and Spain.

In the end Caffè Danesi Nettuno from Nettuno, Italy won the tournament.

== Game Results ==
=== Semi finals ===
Team	1	2	3	4	5	6	7	8	9	R	H	E
(Italy) Nettuno	0	0	0	2	2	0	0	0	0	4	10	2
(Italy) Grosseto	0	0	1	0	0	2	0	0	0	3	7	1

Team	1	2	3	4	5	6	7	8	9	R	H	E
San Marino	0	0	0	0	0	0	0	2	0	2	6	0
(Spain) Barcelona	1	0	0	0	0	0	0	0	0	1	6	1

=== 3rd place ===
Team	1	2	3	4	5	6	7	8	9	R	H	E
(Spain) Barcelona	0	0	0	0	0	0	0	0	0	0	3	1
(Italy) Grosseto	0	0	1	0	0	1	0	1	X	3	9	1

=== Final ===
Team	1	2	3	4	5	6	7	8	9	R	H	E
San Marino	0	0	0	1	0	0	1	0	0	2	8	0
(Italy) Nettuno	0	0	0	1	0	0	0	2	X	3	6	3

== Final standings ==
Rk	Team
1	(Italy) Nettuno
Lost in Final
2	San Marino
Failed to qualify for the Final
3	(Italy) Grosseto
4	(Spain) Barcelona

2008 European Champion

Nettuno
1st title
