= 2009 División de Honor de Béisbol =

The 2009 División de Honor de Béisbol was the 2009 season of the top Spanish baseball league.

The Marlins de Puerto Cruz won their fifth of five consecutive titles.

== Regular-Season Standings ==
División de Honor
| Team | Pld | W | L | Runs+ | Runs- | H | E | AVE |
| Marlins de Puerto Cruz | 18 | 18 | 0 | 155 | 25 | 188 | 13 | 1000 |
| FC Barcelona | 18 | 15 | 3 | 104 | 40 | 154 | 13 | 833 |
| Sant Boi | 18 | 13 | 5 | 127 | 50 | 191 | 23 | 722 |
| Viladecans | 18 | 9 | 9 | 87 | 84 | 134 | 30 | 500 |
| San Inazio | 16 | 8 | 8 | 86 | 65 | 128 | 32 | 500 |
| Halcones de Vigo | 16 | 8 | 8 | 65 | 86 | 122 | 46 | 500 |
| El Llano | 18 | 7 | 11 | 55 | 72 | 126 | 23 | 389 |
| Beisbol Navarra | 16 | 5 | 11 | 43 | 103 | 101 | 24 | 313 |
| Pamplona | 16 | 3 | 13 | 66 | 132 | 134 | 49 | 188 |
| CB Astros | 18 | 0 | 18 | 44 | 175 | 120 | 45 | 0 |
