= Forte Sangallo =

Fort in Nettuno, Italy

Coordinates: 41.4560°N 12.6563°E

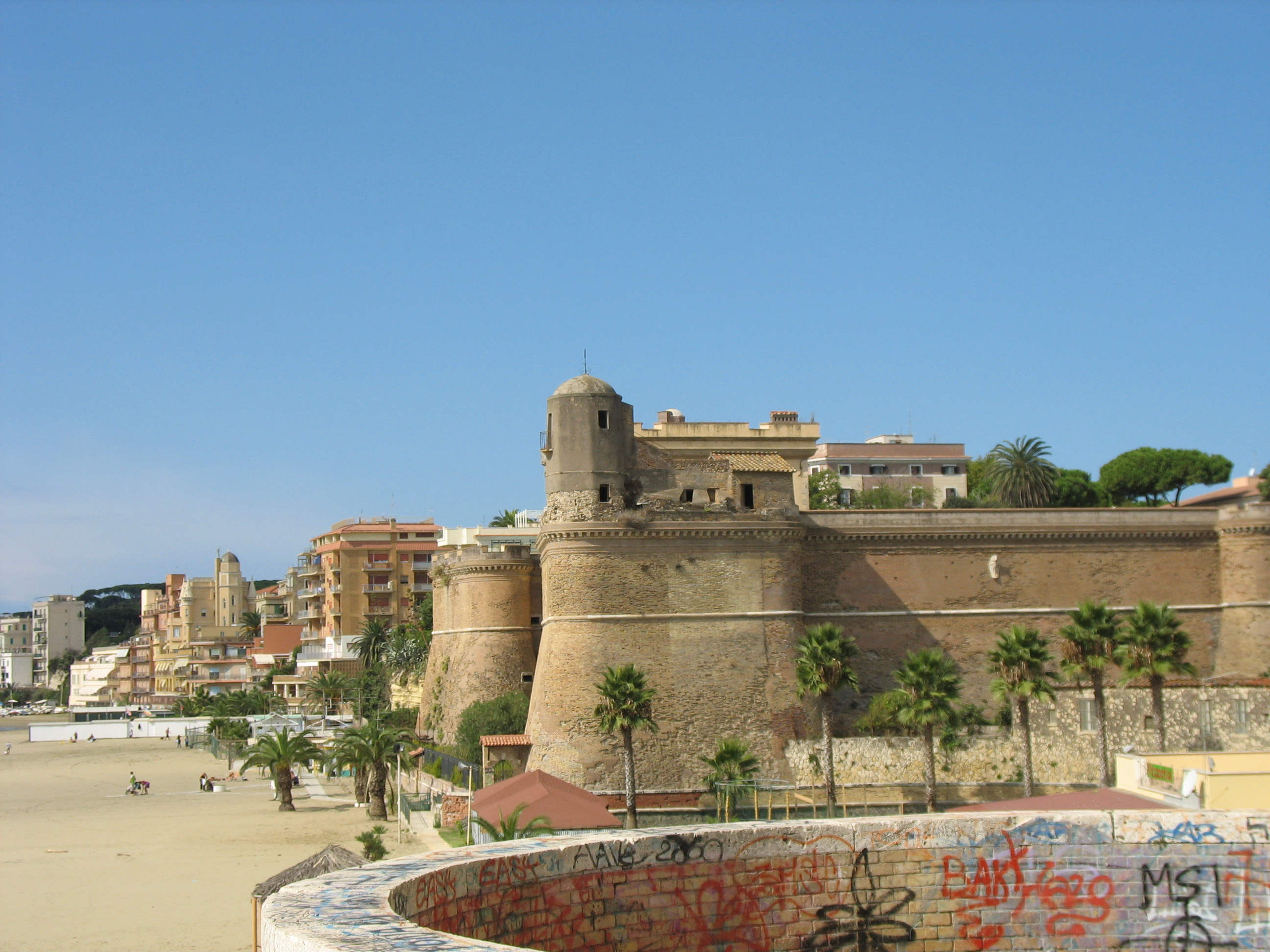
View of Forte Sangallo

Forte Sangallo, also known as the Fortezza di Nettuno, is a Renaissance fortification built on the Tyrrhenian Sea, in the historic village of the City of Nettuno, in the south of Rome. The fortification is a very popular tourist destination today with its well-preserved old quarter (the medieval village) with narrow streets and small squares.

== History ==
Forte Sangallo was built in 1501 by Pope Alexander VI and his son Cesare Borgia. The project is attributed to the Renaissance architect Antonio da Sangallo the Elder, a true specialist in war fortifications. The fort was tasked to defend the city of Nettuno of a possible attack by sea; at the time Nettuno was considered as the "breadbasket of Lazio". A beautiful drawbridge gives access to the inner court graced by an arcade of round arches.

After the House of Borgia, over the centuries, Forte Sangallo first passes to the Colonna family, then to the Apostolic Camera and from the nineteenth century to the Borghese family. In 1931, the fort belonged to baron Alberto Fassini. Among its guests Forte Sangallo also hosted Queen Marie of Romania and Princess Ileana of Romania, in 1931. In 1997, Forte Sangallo was acquired by Nettuno Council.

It represents the artistic and cultural heart of the town. In the fort, the Municipality of Nettuno set up conferences and contemporary art exhibitions.

Forte Sangallo also houses the "Museo dello Sbrarco Alleato" (Allied Landing Museum) of the Battle of Anzio.
