= CEB Federation Cup =

Annual baseball tournament

- Sport: Baseball
- Founded: 2016
- No. of teams: 6 (in 2023)
- Continent: Europe

The Federation Cup is an annual baseball tournament, sanctioned and created by the Confederation of European Baseball (CEB). The tournament is the third-tier tournament for baseball leagues across Europe, alongside the first-tier Champions Cup, second-tier Confederation Cup, and fourth-tier Federation Cup Qualifiers, all of which operate with a promotion and relegation system for its federations.

The inaugural season of the tournament was held in 2016 in Brno, Czech Republic.

== Federation Cup ==
=== 2026 season ===
==== Group Slovakia ==== Team (Slovakia) Angels Trnava (England) Herts Toucans (Bulgaria) Sofia Blues (Poland) Stal Kutno (Norway) Vålerenga Baseball	==== Group Lithuania ==== Team (Slovakia) Apollo Bratislava (Switzerland) Barracudas Zürich (Lithuania) Kaunas (Poland) Silesia Rybnik

=== Results ===
Year	Host	Medalists		
Year	Host	Champions	Runners-up	3rd place
2016; Details	(Czech Republic); Brno	(Czech Republic); Draci Brno	(Sweden); Sölvesborg Firehawks	(Belgium); Spartans Deurne
2017; Details	(Spain); Valencia	(Belgium); Borgerhout Squirrels	(Spain); Astros Valencia	(Belgium); Spartans Deurne
2018; Details	(Belgium); Brasschaat	(Spain); Astros Valencia	(Sweden); Sölvesborg Firehawks	(Belgium); Brasschaat Braves
2019; Details	(Croatia); Karlovac	(Austria); Dornbirn Indians	(Austria); Vienna Metrostars	(Belgium); Borgerhout Squirrels
2021; Details	(Belgium); Brasschaat	(Croatia); Olimpija Karlovac	(Belgium); Brasschaat Braves	(Austria); Vienna Wanderers
2022; Details	(Belgium); Brasschaat	(Spain); Astros Valencia	(Belgium); Brasschaat Braves	(Austria); Wiener Neustadt Diving Ducks
2023; Details	(Slovakia); Bratislava	(Austria); Dornbirn Indians	(Belgium); Spartans Deurne	(Ukraine); CNTU-OSDYSSOR-Gorn
2024; Details	(Switzerland); Zürich	(Belgium); Hoboken Pioneers	(Sweden); Rättviks BSK	(Republic of Ireland); Mariners
2024; Details	(Croatia); Varaždin	(Croatia); Vindija Varaždin	(Slovakia); Apollo Bratislava	(Bulgaria); Sofia Blues
2025; Details	(Sweden); Stockholm	(United Kingdom); Essex Arrows	(Sweden); Stockholm Monarchs	(Switzerland); Zurich Barracudas
2025; Details	(Slovenia); Ljubljana	(Slovenia); Krajnski Lisjaki	(Sweden); Rättvik BSK	(Bulgaria); Sofia Blues
2026; Details	(Slovakia); Trnava	(Norway); Vålerenga Baseball	(Poland); Stal Kutno	(Bulgaria); Sofia Blues
2026; Details	(Lithuania); Kaunas	(Slovakia); Apollo Bratislava	(Switzerland); Barracudas Zürich	(Lithuania); Kaunas Lituanica
2027; Details	(Hungary); Jánossomorja			

=== Titles by team ===
Team	Number of championships	Years
(Spain) Astros Valencia	2	2018, 2022
(Austria) Dornbirn Indians	2	2019, 2023
(Croatia) Olimpija Karlovac	1	2021
(Belgium) Borgerhout Squirrels	1	2017
(Czech Republic) Draci Brno	1	2016

== Medals (2016-2023) ==
Rank	Nation	Gold	Silver	Bronze	Total
1	Austria	2	1	2	5
2	Spain	2	1	0	3
3	Belgium	1	3	4	8
4	Croatia	1	0	0	1
4	Czech Republic	1	0	0	1
6	Sweden	0	2	0	2
7	Ukraine	0	0	1	1
Totals (7 entries)		7	7	7	21

== Federation Cup Qualifiers ==
=== 2026 season ===
Group A	Group B
(Bulgaria) CBS Lions NSA	(Hungary) Jánossomorja Rascals
(Finland) Puumat Baseball	(Ukraine) Kyiv BC
(Norway) Kristiansand Suns	(Finland) Tampere Tigers
(Lithuania) Utenos Titanai	(Romania) Thunder Wolves Botoșani

=== Results ===
Year	Host	Medalists		
Year	Host	Champions	Runners-up	3rd place
2016; Details	(United Kingdom); London	(Belgium); Borgerhout Squirrels	(Poland); MKS Stal Kutno	(United Kingdom); London Mets
2016; Details	(Spain); Sant Boi	(Spain); Sant Boi	(United Kingdom); Southampton Mustangs	(Switzerland); Therwil Flyers
2017; Details	(Slovakia); Bratislava	(Slovakia); Apollo Bratislava	(Switzerland); Zurich Barracudas	(Poland); WUKB Centaury
2017; Details	(Serbia); Belgrade	(Austria); Diving Ducks W.Neustadt	(Serbia); Beograd '96	(United Kingdom); Southampton Mustangs
2017; Details	(Sweden); Stockholm	(Spain); Sant Boi	(Lithuania); Kaunas County B.C.	(United Kingdom); London Mets
2018; Details	(Bulgaria); Blagoevgrad	(Austria); Vienna Wanderers	(Bulgaria); Blagoevgrad Buffaloes	(United Kingdom); London Mets
2018; Details	(Poland); Rybnik	(Switzerland); Zurich Barracudas	(Poland); KS Silesia Rybnik	(Lithuania); Kaunas County
2019; Details	(Russia); Moscow	(Russia); Russtar Moscow	(Bulgaria); Sofia Blues	(Slovakia); Apollo Bratislava
2019; Details	(Bulgaria); Blagoevgrad	(Sweden); Sölvesborg Firehawks	(Poland); UKS Deby Osielsko	(Bulgaria); Athletic Sofia
2021; Details	(Bulgaria); Blagoevgrad	(United Kingdom); London Mets	(Russia); RuStar	(Bulgaria); Athletic Sofia
2021; Details	(Ukraine); Boguslav	(Spain); Tenerife Marlins	(Lithuania); Utenos Titanai	(United Kingdom); London Capitals
2021; Details	(Slovakia); Bratislava	(Bulgaria); Sofia Blues BSC	(Lithuania); Kaunas County	(Romania); LPS CCS Roman
2022; Details	(Poland); Kutno	(Sweden); Rattvik Base&Softball Club	(Lithuania); Beisbolo Klubas Vilnius	(Poland); MKS Stal Bis Kutno
2022; Details	(Serbia); Belgrade	(Slovakia); Apollo Bratislava	(Serbia); Vojvodina	(Poland); Barrons Wroclaw
2022; Details	(Bulgaria); Sofia	(Switzerland); Barracudas Zurich	(United Kingdom); London Capitals	(Croatia); Bk Zagreb
2023; Details	(Sweden); Sundbyberg	(Republic of Ireland); Mariners Baseball Ireland	(Sweden); Sundbybergs BSC	(Lithuania); BK Vilnius
2023; Details	(Hungary); Budapest	(Croatia); BK Zagreb	(Bulgaria); Sofia Blues	(Hungary); Budapest Red Wolves
2023; Details	(Poland); Rybnik	(United Kingdom); London Mets	(Poland); Silesia Rybnik	(Bulgaria); Athletic Sofia
2024; Details	(Slovenia); Ljubljana	(Slovenia); Kranjski Lisjaki	(Norway); Vålerenga Baseball	(Bulgaria); Akademics Sofia
2024; Details	(Sweden); Stockholm	(Sweden); Stockholms Baseball	(Poland); Kutno	(United Kingdom); London Capitals
2025; Details	(Poland); Kutno	(Slovakia); Baseballový klub Angels Trnava	(Poland); MKS STAL Kutno	(Lithuania); Vilnius
2025; Details	(Norway); Kristiansand	(United Kingdom); London Mets	(Lithuania); Kaunas County	(Poland); Silesia Rybnik
2026; Details	(Hungary); Janossomorja	(Hungary); Jánossomorja Rascals	(Lithuania); Utenos Titanai	(Norway); Kristiansand Suns

== See also ==
- European Champions Cup
- European Confederation Cup
- European Baseball Championship
- Asia Series
- Caribbean Series
- Baseball awards § Europe
