= Drew Strotman =

American baseball player (born 1996)

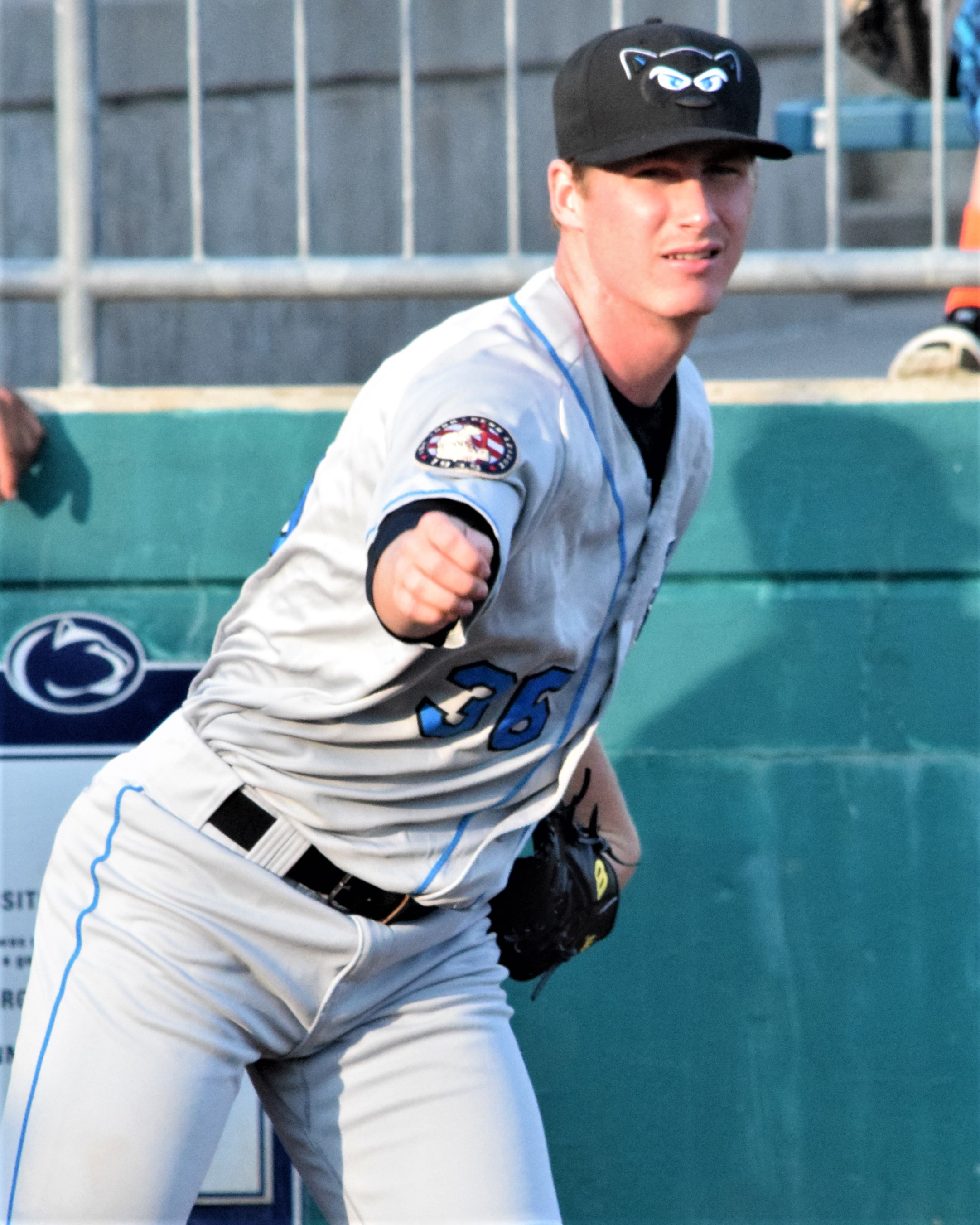
- Strotman in 2017 with the Hudson Valley Renegades

Free agent
- Pitcher
- Born: September 3, 1996 (age 30); Sunnyvale, California, U.S.
- Bats: Right Throws: Right

Andrew Gregory Strotman (born September 3, 1996) is an American professional baseball pitcher who is a free agent.

== Amateur career ==
Strotman attended Homestead High School in Cupertino, California. In 2014, his senior year, he went 6–3 with a 0.54 ERA. He was not drafted out of high school, and enrolled at Saint Mary's College of California, where he played college baseball.

In 2015, Strotman's freshman year at Saint Mary's, he pitched 34 2/3 innings, going 2–3 with an 8.57 ERA. As a sophomore in 2016, he pitched in 22 games (making three starts), compiling a 3–5 record with a 3.96 ERA. In 2017, his junior season, Strotman pitched to a 6–1 record and a 4.57 ERA over 18 games (seven starts), striking out 75 batters over 67 innings.

== Professional career ==
=== Tampa Bay Rays ===
Strotman was drafted by the Tampa Bay Rays in the fourth round, with the 109th overall selection, of the 2017 Major League Baseball draft. Strotman signed with the Rays and made his professional debut with the Hudson Valley Renegades of the Low–A New York-Penn League, going 2–3 with a 1.78 ERA over 11 games (seven starts). He was named an All-Star. In 2018, he pitched with the Bowling Green Hot Rods of the Single–A Midwest League where he went 3–0 with a 3.52 ERA over 46 innings. He missed the last three months of the season after undergoing Tommy John surgery.

He returned to the mound in 2019 with the Charlotte Stone Crabs of the High–A Florida State League, pitching to an 0–2 record and a 5.06 ERA over 16 innings. Strotman did not play in a game in 2020 due to the cancellation of the minor league season because of the COVID-19 pandemic. On November 20, 2020, the Rays added Strotman to their 40-man roster to protect him from the Rule 5 draft. To begin the 2021 season, he was assigned to the Durham Bulls of the Triple-A East. Over 13 games (12 starts) with Durham, he posted a 7–2 record and a 3.39 ERA.

=== Minnesota Twins ===
On July 22, 2021, Strotman was traded alongside Joe Ryan to the Minnesota Twins in exchange for Nelson Cruz and Calvin Faucher. He was assigned to the St. Paul Saints of the Triple-A East. Over 12 starts with St. Paul, Strotman went 3–3 with a 7.33 ERA and 42 strikeouts over 54 innings.

Pitching for St. Paul in 2022, he was 3–2 with a 6.44 ERA in 39 relief appearances, in which he pitched 50.1 innings and struck out 58 batters. On September 17, 2022, the Twins designated Strotman for assignment.

=== Texas Rangers ===
On September 19, 2022, Strotman was claimed off waivers by the Texas Rangers. Pitching for the Triple–A Round Rock Express in 2022, he was 1–0 in three relief appearances in which he pitched 2 1/3 innings, giving up one earned run.

=== San Francisco Giants ===
On November 10, 2022, the San Francisco Giants claimed Strotman off waivers from the Texas Rangers. On November 15, Strotman was designated for assignment by the Giants after they protected multiple prospects from the Rule 5 draft. On November 18, he was non-tendered and became a free agent. Strotman re-signed with the Giants on a minor league contract the next day. He spent the entire 2023 season with the Triple–A Sacramento River Cats, making 32 appearances (13 starts) and posting a 5–7 record and 6.47 ERA with 96 strikeouts across 97 1/3 innings pitched. Strotman elected free agency following the season on November 6, 2023.

=== Houston Astros ===
On January 29, 2024, Strotman signed a minor league contract with the Houston Astros. He made 29 appearances split between the Double–A Corpus Christi Hooks and Triple–A Sugar Land Space Cowboys, accumulating a combined 3.58 ERA with 43 strikeouts across 37 2/3 innings pitched. On July 22, Strotman was released by the Astros organization.

=== San Francisco Giants (second sint) ===
On July 31, 2024, Strotman signed a minor league contract with the San Francisco Giants. In 9 appearances for the Triple-A Sacramento River Cats, he logged a 4.61 ERA with 12 strikeouts across 13 2/3 innings pitched. Strotman elected free agency following the season on November 4.

=== Tecolotes de los Dos Laredos ===
On May 2, 2025, Strotman signed with the Tecolotes de los Dos Laredos of the Mexican League. Strotman made 20 appearances (including nine starts) for the Tecolotes, posting a 2-3 record and 5.63 ERA with 40 strikeouts over 56 innings of work.

=== Conspiradores de Querétaro ===
On February 9, 2026, Strotman and Anthony Vizcaya were traded to the Conspiradores de Querétaro of the Mexican League. He did not make the team and became a free agent prior to the start of the season.
