= Baseball in Spain =

The main ruling organization regarding baseball in Spain is the Royal Spanish Baseball and Softball Federation (Real Federación Española de Béisbol y Sófbol).

== History ==
Baseball began relatively early in Spain thanks to the descendants of immigrants from Cuba. They brought the sport along with them when Cuba ceased to be a Spanish colony. The heyday of baseball in Spain was in the 1950s and 1960s.

Owing to growing mass interest in football, many baseball clubs didn't survive into the 1970s. The Spanish public's massive shift in focus was largely triggered by the introduction of multiple TV channels that focused mainly on broadcasting the football matches of La Liga, the professional First Division Spanish League. One of the few survivors was the CB Viladecans, whose field was officially used during the 1992 Summer Olympics.

== Structure ==
The Spanish baseball league is divided into divisions. The top teams play in the División de Honor. In each division, a team plays all other teams twice, once at home and once away, and two matches in the same day, during the regular season. There are no playoffs. The top four teams at the end of the season play in the Copa del Rey. The champion and the cup winner play in the various European Cup.

The Spanish league teams compete in Europe under CEB, most notably in the Baseball Champions League and CEB cup.

The Spanish teams also compete in a domestic cup competition each year, called the Copa del Rey de Beisbol.

=== Current hierarchical divisional breakdown ===
- División de Honor (one group of eight teams)
- Primera División (six interregional groups)

Since 2015 there are no relegations to the Primera División, as teams from this league are not able to meet the requirements for promotion.

For a list of teams, see List of baseball clubs in Spain

=== Other competitions ===
- Copa del Rey de Beisbol
- Spain national baseball team
