= CD Pamplona =

Association football club in Spain

Pamplona
- Full name: Club Deportivo Pamplona
- Founded: 1958
- Ground: Beitikuntzea - Lizasoáin, Pamplona, Navarre, Spain
- Capacity: 1,000
- President: (Spain) Manuel Larumbe
- Head coach: (Spain) Xabi Nicolás
- League: Tercera Federación – Group 15
- 2025–26: Tercera Federación – Group 15, 2nd of 18
Home colours	Away colours

Club Deportivo Pamplona is a Spanish sports club based in Pamplona, in the autonomous community of Navarre. Their football team currently play in Tercera Federación – Group 15, holding home games at Beitikuntzea - Lizasoáin, a stadium with 1,000 seats.

Across different eras, future international players Jesús María Satrústegui, Nacho Monreal, Iñaki Williams and Nico Williams learned their skills in the youth sections of the club.

== History ==
CD Pamplona was founded on October 31, 1958. Since the green color was already occupied it was decided to use the green diagonal stripe as the sign of the city to represent the club's identity. In the 2018-19 season the club finished 17th in the Tercera División, Group 15.

== Season to season ==
Season	Tier	Division	Place	Copa del Rey
1969–70	5	2ª Reg.	8th	
1970–71	5	2ª Reg.	1st	
1971–72	4	1ª Reg.	11th	
1972–73	4	1ª Reg.	14th	
1973–74	4	1ª Reg.	15th	
1974–75	5	1ª Reg.	1st	
1975–76	4	Reg. Pref.	13th	
1976–77	4	Reg. Pref.	14th	
1977–78	5	Reg. Pref.	18th	
1978–79	6	1ª Reg.	14th	
1979–80	7	2ª Reg.	1st	
1980–81	6	1ª Reg.	11th	
1981–82	6	1ª Reg.	8th	
1982–83	6	1ª Reg.	2nd	
1983–84	5	Reg. Pref.	16th	
1984–2001	DNP			
2001–02	6	1ª Reg.	6th	
2002–03	6	1ª Reg.	2nd	
2003–04	6	1ª Reg.	4th	
2004–05	5	Reg. Pref.	7th	

Season	Tier	Division	Place	Copa del Rey
2005–06	5	Reg. Pref.	4th	
2006–07	5	Reg. Pref.	11th	
2007–08	5	Reg. Pref.	8th	
2008–09	5	Reg. Pref.	1st	
2009–10	4	3ª	11th	
2010–11	4	3ª	11th	
2011–12	4	3ª	10th	
2012–13	4	3ª	12th	
2013–14	4	3ª	11th	
2014–15	4	3ª	15th	
2015–16	4	3ª	12th	
2016–17	4	3ª	15th	
2017–18	4	3ª	6th	
2018–19	4	3ª	17th	
2019–20	4	3ª	4th	
2020–21	4	3ª	5th / 1st	
2021–22	5	3ª RFEF	9th	
2022–23	5	3ª Fed.	12th	
2023–24	5	3ª Fed.	10th	
2024–25	5	3ª Fed.	9th	

Season	Tier	Division	Place	Copa del Rey
2025–26	5	3ª Fed.	2nd	
2026–27	5	3ª Fed.		First round

- 12 seasons in Tercera División
- 6 seasons in Tercera Federación/Tercera División RFEF

== Men's baseball ==
Pamplona

Information
- League: División de Honor
- Location: Pamplona
- Ballpark: Instalaciones Deportivas El Soto, Burlada
- Founded: 1974
- 2014: 7–25, 8th
- Management: Manuel Larumbe
- Coach: Txetxo San Martín
- Website: cdpamplona.com

Current uniforms
Home	Away

The men's baseball team it plays in División de Honor de Béisbol.

=== Season to season ===
Season	Level	Division	Place
2008	1	DH	8th
2009	1	DH	9th
2010	1	DH	9th
2011	1	DH	9th
2012	1	DH	8th
2013	1	DH	8th
2014	1	DH	8th
2015	1	DH	7th
2016	1	DH	7th
