= FC Barcelona (baseball) =

Former Spanish baseball team

Fútbol Club Barcelona baseball
- Logo

Information
- League: División de Honor de Béisbol
- Ballpark: Pérez de Rozas Stadium, Barcelona, Catalonia, Spain
- Founded: 1941
- Disbanded: 2011

Fútbol Club Barcelona was a Catalan Spanish baseball team located in Barcelona. It was a sports section of the association football club FC Barcelona.

It was founded in 1931. Two years later, the club won its first title by winning the Catalan Cup, but was later dissolved for unknown reasons. It was later refounded in 1941, but the club struggled and won no title in the first five years. Eventually, the club had massive success and became an elite club by winning 18 Spanish league, three Spanish cups and more. Immediately after this victory, however, the sports section was dissolved in 2011 due to financial reasons. Most of the players that made up the team at the time of its dissolution joined Club Béisbol Barcelona.

== History ==
FC Barcelona was a professional baseball club in Spain which was founded in 1931 but was dissolved two years later. It was later refounded in 1941 in the period where Spanish baseball was dominated above all by the sports sections of famous football clubs. The club played in the first editions of the Spanish Championship, winning three of them. Afterwards they faded into the background and did not experience new successes for several decades.

FC Barcelona returned to competing for national titles starting in 2005, when they lost 6–1 in the Copa del Rey final against Rojos de Candelaria. In 2007 they won their first European trophy, the CEB Cup, beating Heidenheim Heideköpfe 13–9 in the final. After finishing second in the previous five editions, the club finally managed to obtain their fourth national title in 2011 winning the Spanish league.

The club was dissolved on June 1, 2011, by decision of the board of directors chaired by Sandro Rosell, due to financial reasons, just after having won the fourth Spanish league. To keep the tradition of the historic team alive, a new club was founded, which is still active today, Club Beisbol Barcelona .

== Honours ==
- 18 Spanish league: 1946, 1947, 1956, 1961, 1964, 1965, 1969, 1975, 1976, 1978, 1983, 1986, 1995, 1996, 2002, 2003, 2004, 2011
- 3 Copa del Rey: 1946, 1947, 1956
- 1 CEB Cup: 2007
- 12 Campionat de Catalunya de beisbol: 1933, 1947, 1952, 1955, 1975, 1996, 1998, 2006, 2007, 2008, 2009, 2011
- 1 Supercopa de Cataluña: 2006
