= 2011 European Cup (baseball) =

Tournament details
- Countries: Italy; Netherlands
- Dates: 1–5 June
- Teams: 12

The 2011 European Cup was an international baseball competition among the top teams of the professional baseball leagues in Europe, held in Italy and the Netherlands from June 1 to June 5, 2011.

== Amsterdam ==
=== Standings ===
Teams	W	L	Pct.	GB	R	RA
(Italy) UGF Fortitudo	4	1	.800	—	46	21
(Netherlands) L&D Amsterdam	4	1	.800	—	41	13
(Germany) Heidenheim Heideköpfe	3	2	.600	1	36	27
(Spain) Sant Boi	2	3	.400	2	29	34
(Belgium) Hoboken Pioneers	2	3	.400	2	22	42
(Russia) North Stars	0	5	.000	4	11	48

=== Schedule and results ===
June 1, 2011	North Stars (Russia)	3–8	(Belgium) Hoboken Pioneers	Osdorp, Netherlands; Attendance: 100
June 1, 2011		Boxscore		Osdorp, Netherlands; Attendance: 100

June 1, 2011	Sant Boi (Spain)	3–16 (F/7)	(Italy) UGF Fortitudo	Osdorp, Netherlands; Attendance: 210
June 1, 2011		Boxscore		Osdorp, Netherlands; Attendance: 210

June 1, 2011	Heidenheim Heideköpfe (Germany)	4–7	(Netherlands) L&D Amsterdam	Osdorp, Netherlands; Attendance: 500
June 1, 2011		Boxscore		Osdorp, Netherlands; Attendance: 500

June 2, 2011	UGF Fortitudo (Italy)	10–2	(Russia) North Stars	Osdorp, Netherlands; Attendance: 140
June 2, 2011		Boxscore		Osdorp, Netherlands; Attendance: 140

June 2, 2011	Hoboken Pioneers (Belgium)	8–7	(Germany) Heidenheim Heideköpfe	Osdorp, Netherlands; Attendance: 200
June 2, 2011		Boxscore		Osdorp, Netherlands; Attendance: 200

June 2, 2011	L&D Amsterdam (Netherlands)	9–2	(Spain) Sant Boi	Osdorp, Netherlands; Attendance: 470
June 2, 2011		Boxscore		Osdorp, Netherlands; Attendance: 470

June 3, 2011	Sant Boi (Spain)	2–6	(Germany) Heidenheim Heideköpfe	Osdorp, Netherlands; Attendance: 0
June 3, 2011		Boxscore		Osdorp, Netherlands; Attendance: 0

June 3, 2011	Hoboken Pioneers (Belgium)	4–8	(Italy) UGF Fortitudo	Osdorp, Netherlands; Attendance: 220
June 3, 2011		Boxscore		Osdorp, Netherlands; Attendance: 220

June 3, 2011	L&D Amsterdam (Netherlands)	7–1	(Russia) North Stars	Osdorp, Netherlands; Attendance: 450
June 3, 2011		Boxscore		Osdorp, Netherlands; Attendance: 450

June 4, 2011	Heidenheim Heideköpfe (Germany)	7–6 (F/12)	(Italy) UGF Fortitudo	Osdorp, Netherlands; Attendance: 130
June 4, 2011		Boxscore		Osdorp, Netherlands; Attendance: 130

June 4, 2011	Sant Boi (Spain)	11–1 (F/7)	(Russia) North Stars	Osdorp, Netherlands; Attendance: 185
June 4, 2011		Boxscore		Osdorp, Netherlands; Attendance: 185

June 4, 2011	L&D Amsterdam (Netherlands)	13–0 (F/7)	(Belgium) Hoboken Pioneers	Osdorp, Netherlands; Attendance: 450
June 4, 2011		Boxscore		Osdorp, Netherlands; Attendance: 450

June 5, 2011	Hoboken Pioneers (Belgium)	2–11	(Spain) Sant Boi	Osdorp, Netherlands; Attendance: 150
June 5, 2011		Boxscore		Osdorp, Netherlands; Attendance: 150

June 5, 2011	North Stars (Russia)	4–12	(Germany) Heidenheim Heideköpfe	Osdorp, Netherlands; Attendance: 150
June 5, 2011		Boxscore		Osdorp, Netherlands; Attendance: 150

June 5, 2011	UGF Fortitudo (Italy)	6–5	(Netherlands) L&D Amsterdam	Osdorp, Netherlands; Attendance: 550
June 5, 2011		Boxscore		Osdorp, Netherlands; Attendance: 550

== Parma ==
=== Standings ===
Teams	W	L	Pct.	GB	R	RA
T&A San Marino	4	1	.800	—	35	10
(Italy) ASD Parma	4	1	.800	—	27	19
(Netherlands) DOOR Neptunus	3	2	.600	1	20	16
(Czech Republic) Draci Brno	2	2	.500	1½	17	19
(France) Rouen Huskies	1	4	.200	3	8	22
(Spain) Tenerife Marlins	0	4	.000	3½	5	26

=== Schedule and results ===
June 1, 2011	DOOR Neptunus (Netherlands)	7–3	T&A San Marino	Parma, Italy; Attendance: 120
June 1, 2011		Boxscore		Parma, Italy; Attendance: 120

June 1, 2011	Rouen Huskies (France)	2–10	(Czech Republic) Draci Brno	Collecchio, Italy; Attendance: 30
June 1, 2011		Boxscore		Collecchio, Italy; Attendance: 30

June 1, 2011	ASD Parma (Italy)	4–7	(Spain) Tenerife Marlins	Parma, Italy; Attendance: 390
June 1, 2011		Boxscore		Parma, Italy; Attendance: 390

June 2, 2011	Draci Brno (Czech Republic)	4–3 (F/10)	(Netherlands) DOOR Neptunus	Parma, Italy; Attendance: 110
June 2, 2011		Boxscore		Parma, Italy; Attendance: 110

June 2, 2011	Tenerife Marlins (Spain)	0–1	(France) Rouen Huskies	Collecchio, Italy; Attendance: 42
June 2, 2011		Boxscore		Collecchio, Italy; Attendance: 42

June 2, 2011	T&A San Marino	10–0 (F/8)	(Italy) ASD Parma	Parma, Italy; Attendance: 730
June 2, 2011		Boxscore		Parma, Italy; Attendance: 730

June 3, 2011	Tenerife Marlins (Spain)	2–6	(Netherlands) DOOR Neptunus	Parma, Italy; Attendance: 107
June 3, 2011		Boxscore		Parma, Italy; Attendance: 107

June 3, 2011	T&A San Marino	6–1	(Czech Republic) Draci Brno	Collecchio, Italy; Attendance: 100
June 3, 2011		Boxscore		Collecchio, Italy; Attendance: 100

June 3, 2011	Rouen Huskies (France)	4–5	(Italy) ASD Parma	Parma, Italy; Attendance: 330
June 3, 2011		Boxscore		Parma, Italy; Attendance: 330

June 4, 2011	Tenerife Marlins (Spain)	1–12 (F/8)	T&A San Marino	Parma, Italy; Attendance: 54
June 4, 2011		Boxscore		Parma, Italy; Attendance: 54

June 4, 2011	Rouen Huskies (France)	0–3	(Netherlands) DOOR Neptunus	Collecchio, Italy; Attendance: 85
June 4, 2011		Boxscore		Collecchio, Italy; Attendance: 85

June 4, 2011	ASD Parma (Italy)	8–2	(Czech Republic) Draci Brno	Parma, Italy; Attendance: 480
June 4, 2011		Boxscore		Parma, Italy; Attendance: 480

June 5, 2011	T&A San Marino	4–1	(France) Rouen Huskies	Parma, Italy; Attendance: 110
June 5, 2011		Boxscore		Parma, Italy; Attendance: 110

June 5, 2011	Draci Brno (Czech Republic)	1–1 (F/5)	(Spain) Tenerife Marlins	Collecchio, Italy
June 5, 2011		Boxscore		Collecchio, Italy

June 5, 2011	DOOR Neptunus (Netherlands)	1–7	(Italy) ASD Parma	Parma, Italy; Attendance: 290
June 5, 2011		Boxscore		Parma, Italy; Attendance: 290
