= Modena Baseball Club =

Italian baseball franchise

The Modena Baseball Club is an Italian baseball franchise which was founded in 1966 and began play in 1967. The team is based in the city of Modena, Italy.

Throughout its history, the Modena team has played at different levels, including eight seasons in the Italian Baseball League between 1999 and 2006. Many of the official team nicknames have contained the name of the team's corporate sponsor, the most prominent being the GB Ricambi Modena.
