= 1989 European Baseball Championship =

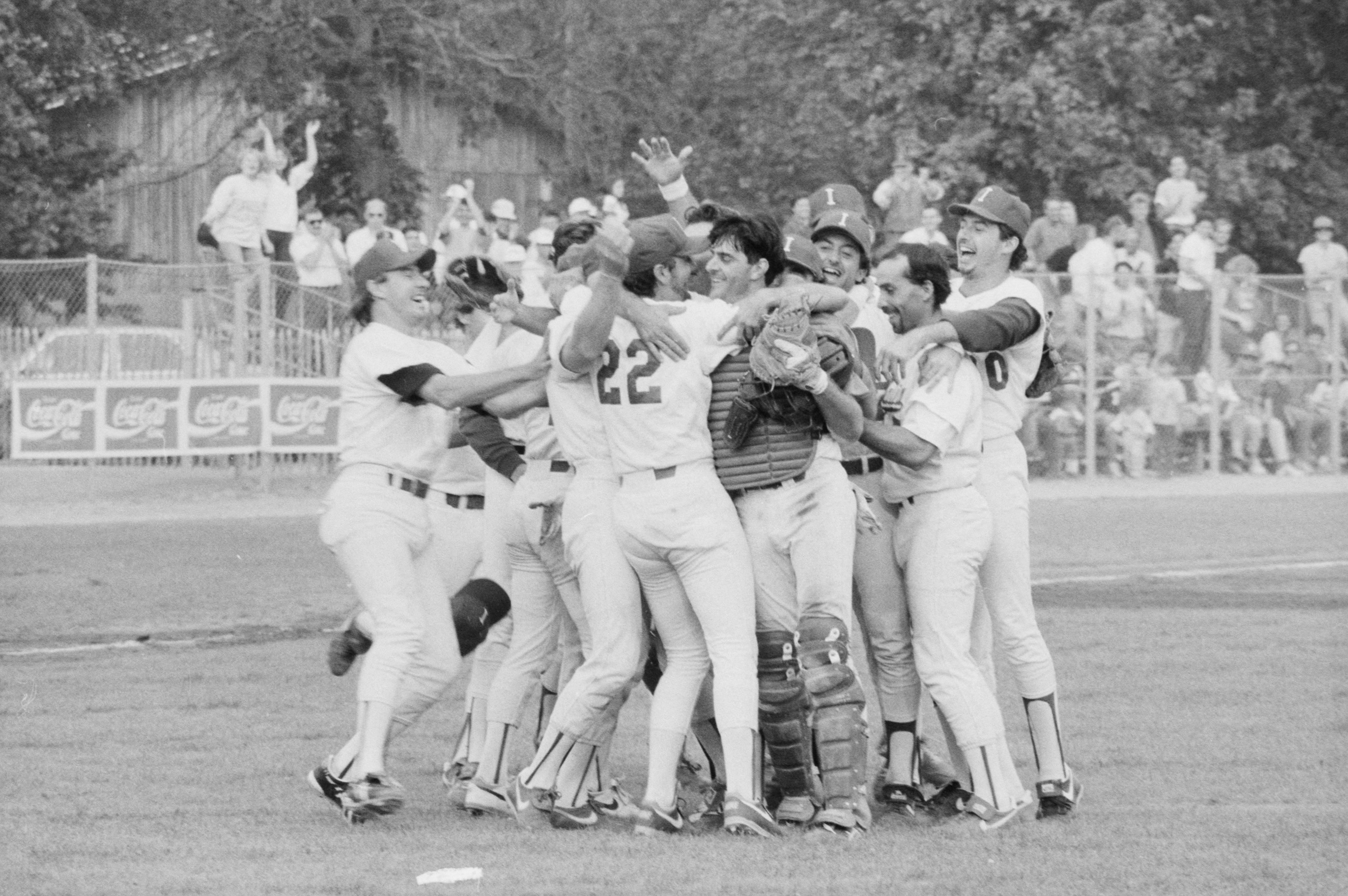
- Italy celebrating winning the tournament

Tournament details
- Country: France
- Dates: 1–10 September
- Teams: 8
- Defending champions: Netherlands

Final positions
- Champions: Italy (6th title)
- Runners-up: Netherlands
- Third place: Spain
- Fourth place: Sweden

Awards
- MVP: (Netherlands) Robert Niggebrugge

The 1989 European Baseball Championship was held in Paris, France and was won by Italy, which defeated the Netherlands in a three-game championship series. Eight teams competed, the largest field since the 1971 championship.

The tournament had many blowout games. In the group stage, the Netherlands beat Great Britain 35–0, Italy defeated Germany 24–4, and Spain defeated Germany 22–4. The Italians beat the Netherlands 15–2 in the second round, and Spain beat Sweden 18–9 to win the bronze medal.

The defending-champion Dutch team was without several of its best players, including Robert Eenhorn and Rikkert Faneyte, both of whom were playing in the American minor leagues during the tournament.

== Standings ==
Pos.	Team	Record
1	Italy	6–2
2	Netherlands	6–2
3	Spain	5–3
4	Sweden	3–5
5	France	4–4
6	Belgium	4–4
7	Great Britain	3–5
8	Germany	1–7

== Awards ==
- Most valuable player: (Netherlands) Robert Niggebrugge
- Best hitter: (Italy) Claudio Cecconi
- Best pitcher: (Netherlands) Peter Callenbach
