= 2011 División de Honor de Béisbol =

División de Honor
- Season: 2011
- Champions: FC Barcelona
- Relegated: Sevilla Red Sox
- Matches: 180

División de Honor de Béisbol 2011 was the 26th season since its establishment. 2011 season lasted from February to July. FC Barcelona claimed their 4th and last title of their history after of being disbanded by FC Barcelona's chairman Sandro Rosell.

== Final standings ==
| # | Team | P | W | L | Pct. | R | RA |
|---|---|---|---|---|---|---|---|
| 1 | FC Barcelona | 36 | 33 | 3 | .916 | 241 | 79 |
| 2 | Sant Boi | 36 | 26 | 10 | .722 | 249 | 127 |
| 3 | Marlins Puerto Cruz | 36 | 24 | 12 | .666 | 236 | 102 |
| 4 | Astros | 36 | 24 | 12 | .666 | 223 | 116 |
| 5 | Viladecans | 36 | 24 | 12 | .666 | 187 | 114 |
| 6 | San Inazio | 36 | 15 | 21 | .416 | 189 | 147 |
| 7 | Halcones de Vigo | 36 | 13 | 23 | .361 | 158 | 225 |
| 8 | Béisbol Navarra | 36 | 12 | 24 | .333 | 186 | 196 |
| 9 | Pamplona | 36 | 8 | 28 | .222 | 123 | 284 |
| 10 | Sevilla Red Sox | 36 | 1 | 35 | .027 | 56 | 458 |

| European Cup |
| Relegated to Primera División |

2011 División de Honor winners
(Catalonia)
FC Barcelona
Fourth title
