= Nettuno BC 1945 =

Baseball Club based in Nettuno, Italy

- Logo

Information
- League: Italian Baseball League
- Ballpark: Stadio Steno Borghese
- Established: 1945
- European Cup championships: 7 (1965, 1972, 1974, 1991, 1997, 2008, 2009)
- Scudetti: 17 (1951, 1952, 1953, 1954, 1956, 1957, 1958, 1963, 1964, 1965, 1971, 1973, 1990, 1993, 1996, 1998, 2001)
- Former name: Chlorodont Nettuno (1956–57); Algida Nettuno (1959–59); Simmenthal Nettuno (1962–65); Glen Grant Nettuno (1970–73, 1980–81); Colombo Nettuno (1974–77); Polenghi Lombardo Nettuno (1983–84); SCAC Nettuno (1988–92); Caffè Danesi Nettuno (1995–2012)
- Colors: Blue, red, white
- Manager: Ruggero Bagialemani

Current uniforms
| Home | Away |

Nettuno BC 1945 is an Italian baseball club located in Nettuno, a comune of the Metropolitan City of Rome. The club competes in the first division (Serie A) of the Italian Baseball League. Training and home matches are held at Stadio Steno Borghese, which has a capacity of 10,000. The club currently holds the Italian baseball record for most league titles (17).

== History ==
The popularity of baseball in Nettuno is attributable to the number of U.S. military bases present in the area following World War II. American soldiers stationed at the bases often played baseball and softball and included local Italians in their games. One of the Italian baseball pioneers, Alberto Fasano, was a Nettunese. Fasano and his friend Julius Zerella eventually founded Nettuno's first softball team – called Nettuno PS. The team's first players were: John Petrelli, Luciano Serpe, Luciano Verlezza, Manrico David, Fulvio Verlezza, Tonino Marcucci and Sergio Serpe. Their official debut was in 1946 in the First Division Male Softball championship against Milan. The nettunesi won by a score of 32–7. Nettuno PS won its first title in 1949.

In 1950, Nettuno PS became Nettuno USMC. In its first championship, the club finished second, with 12 wins out of 14. Over the next four years (1951, 1952, 1953, 1954), Nettuno USMC won 4 consecutive championships, making the Lazio region most titled of the Italian championship, with 17 league titles. The team won its first European Cup in 1965, and has since won the Cup five more times. The team won the CEBCup 3 times (1993, 1995 and 2000) and the Italian Cup in 1970, 1995 and 1998. In the 2007 and 2008 seasons, they advanced to the finals seven of the Italian Baseball League Series, but lost the title to the Grosseto BBC in 2007 and the San Marino BBC in 2008.

This club has most of the times made the playoffs. The club did not make it to the playoffs only in 2003. During the 2009 season, the club was defeated on 11 April in a home match against Godo. The club bought Manuel Gasparri from Fortitudo Bologna, Manny Alexander from Rimini BC, and other important players from Central America, including Abraham Núñez. Within Europe, Nettuno won the 2009 European Cup in Barcelona, first defeating Haarlem Kinheim and then triumphing in an all-Italian final against Fortitudo Bologna with a result of 1–0, winning the European Champions Cup for the second time in a row.

== See also ==
- Stadio Steno Borghese
