= Nettuno =

- Comune
- Città di Nettuno
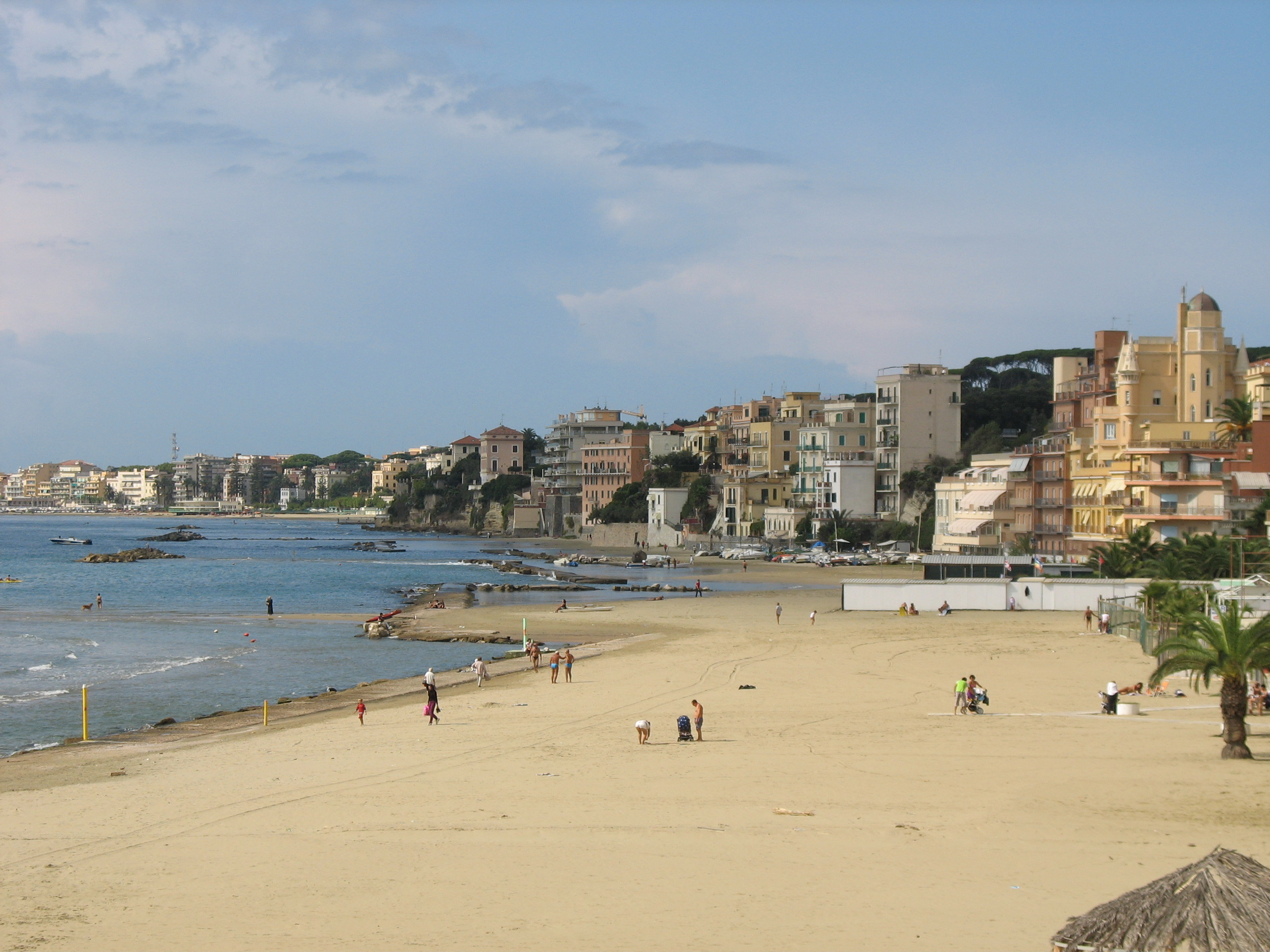
- Coast of Nettuno, east side

- Coat of arms

- Location within Italy Location within Lazio
- Coordinates: 41°27′27″N 12°39′40″E
- Country: Italy
- Region: Lazio
- Metropolitan city: Rome (RM)
- Frazioni: Acciarella, Cadolino, Canala, Cioccati, Cretarossa, Eschieto, Falasche Nord, Grugnole, Ospedaletto, Padiglione, Piscina Cardillo, Pocacqua, Sandalo Di Levante, Sandalo di Ponente, San Giacomo, Scacciapensieri, Tre Cancelli, Zucchetti

Government
  - Mayor: Nicola Burrini (PD)

Area
  - Total: 71.46 km^{2} (27.59 sq mi)
- Elevation: 11 m (36 ft)

Population (30 November 2017)
  - Total: 49,873
  - Density: 697.9/km^{2} (1,808/sq mi)
- Demonym: Nettunesi
- Time zone: UTC+1 (CET)
  - Summer (DST): UTC+2 (CEST)
- Postal code: 00048
- Dialing code: 06
- Patron saint: Madonna delle Grazie
- Website: Official website

Nettuno is a town and comune of the Metropolitan City of Rome in the Lazio region of central Italy, 60 kilometres (37 miles) south of Rome. A resort city and agricultural center on the Tyrrhenian Sea, it has a population of approximately 50,000.

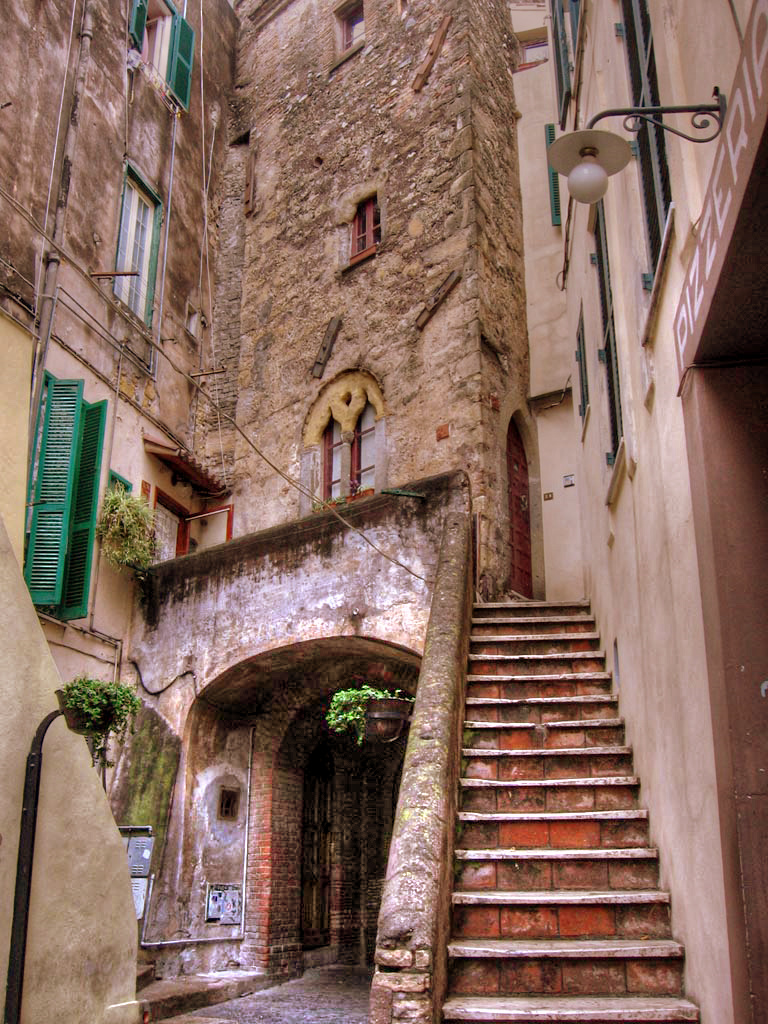
The medieval burg

== Economy ==
It has a touristic harbour hosting about 860 boats and a shopping centre, selling everything for fishing and sailing. There is also a yacht club.

Nettuno is the city of the D.O.C. wine Cacchione.

Nettuno has a large base for the Italian Force, whose territory extends to the Province of Latina, and an Italian Police School, where especially police dogs are trained.

Nettuno is one stop south of Anzio on the local train from Rome and also the last stop of the FL8 line.

== History ==
According to a theory, the town would be a direct survival of the Roman Antium, the territory of which almost entirely corresponded to Nettuno and modern Anzio. Giuseppe Tomassetti considered Nettuno the real heir and continuation of the ancient Antiates. In contrast, Beatrice Cacciotti doubted an ancient origin of the town, and postulated a medieval origin.

Nettuno was probably the location of the ancient Volscian port town of Caenon, which was the closest port of the town Antium (which did not have a natural harbour of its own). According to a more recent theory, the town Caenon would be located on a hill more east to Nettuno, and the port (similarly to the old theory above), would have been over the mouth of the river Loricina. In 469 BC, the town Caenon was destroyed by the Roman consul Titus Numicius Priscus.

A medieval castle, the castrum Neptuni, now known as the Borgo Medievale, most likely arose in the 10th or 11th century. According to local tradition, the name Neptunus would derive from a temple to the Roman god Neptune - the symbol of the town - but it has been hypothesized a derivation from the marshes already present in the area in the late ancient era, or from a raptor night bird, the noctunus.

Nettuno, which territory practically coincided with that of the Roman Antium, in the Middle Ages had an agricultural evolution.

In 1190 Richard the Lionheart, on the way for the Third Crusade, would passed through the castle of Nettuno (Lettun). Since 1420 the town was a fief of the Colonna family, then in the early 16th century passed to the Borgia nobles, later returned under the control of the Colonna, which kept it until 1594, when passed to the Church. In the 15th and 16th centuries Nettuno was among the major coastal fortified centers in Lazio, of which was considered the important breadbasket: to support the walled and turreted Borgo Medievale, between 1501 and 1503 in the Borgia's period, the Forte Sangallo was built by Renaissance architect Antonio da Sangallo the Elder, as it was essential to defend the town against attacks from the sea. In 1582 the poet Antonio Ongaro was in Nettuno hosted by the Colonna, and there for the first time he recited his fisherman’s tale entitled Alceo.

In 1903 the writer Gabriele D'Annunzio was a guest in the town with the actress Eleonora Duse, and wrote the opera La figlia di Iorio.

The scholar Luigi Pirandello wrote a novel, Va bene, set in Nettuno in 1904.

In 1925 the Convenzione di Nettuno, between Italy and Jugoslavia, was signed in the town to regulate the conditions of the Italian citizens in Dalmatia.

From 1940 to 1945, Nettuno and nearby Anzio were a single municipality (comune) called Nettunia.

On January 22, 1944, Anzio and Nettuno were the theatre of an Allied forces landing and the ensuing Battle of Anzio, which began with Operation Shingle during the Second World War. American forces (5th Army) were surrounded by Germans in the caves of Pozzoli in February 1944 for a week, suffering heavy casualties.

== Main sights ==
Nettuno is a popular tourist destination. Sights include a well-preserved old quarter, the Borgo Medievale, with medieval streets and small squares, and the Forte Sangallo mentioned above.

Nettuno is also a centre of pilgrimage to the shrine of Saint Maria Goretti, in which a crypt houses the mortal remains of the saint. The church keeps also a valuable polychromed wooden statue of Our Lady of Grace, which is honoured by the town with a procession every year on the first Saturday of May. It was originally Our Lady of Ipswich, although it left England after the Reformation.

The privately owned Villa Costaguti-Borghese at Nettuno was built in 1648, has gardens in a landscape park designed about 1840, now protected as a nature reserve. The Borghese Gladiator was discovered at Nettuno.

At the north edge of town is the Sicily-Rome American Cemetery and Memorial, where over 7,800 US soldiers are buried.

Near the eastern border of Nettuno there is Torre Astura: a fortified coastal tower of medieval origin, which overlooks a point of land; it is built over the ruins of a Roman villa with a fish pond. The area its a pleasant coastal place, also frequented by Cicero.

== Sport ==
Nettuno Baseball Club is one of the most important Italian baseball teams, often the winner of the national championship. Baseball was taught to the local people by American soldiers after their landing in World War II.

== Notable people ==
- Paolo Segneri
- Luigi Trafelli, physicist and mathematician
- Santa Maria Goretti
- Bruno Conti, football player and manager
- Pierpaolo Piccioli (born 1967), Italian fashion designer
- Anna Favella, actress
- Alessio Romagnoli, football player, grew up in Nettuno

== Twin towns – sister cities ==
Nettuno is twinned with:

- (Republic of Ireland) Ardee, Ireland
- Bandol, France
- Traunreut, Germany
- Wehr, Germany
