= División de Honor de Béisbol =

Spanish baseball league (founded in 1986)

Spanish Baseball League
- Current season, competition or edition: 2025 División de Honor de Béisbol
- Sport: Baseball
- Founded: 1986; 40 years ago
- No. of teams: 10
- Country: Spain
- Confederation: WBSC Europe
- Most recent champion: Astros Valencia (2024)
- Most titles: FC Barcelona (18 titles)
- Level on pyramid: Level 1
- Relegation to: Primera División A
- International cup: European Cup
- Website: rfebs.es

The Spanish Baseball League (formerly Division de Honor de Béisbol) is the highest level of baseball in Spain. The league is overseen by the Royal Spanish Baseball and Softball Federation (RFEBS). It is played principally on weekends. The teams play against each other twice, once at home and once away, in two games during the same day. The champion plays in the European Cup. The official ball of the league is the Rawlings OLB.

In 2025, the league was rebranded to the Spanish Baseball League.

== Competition format ==
Ten teams plays in a double-leg round-robin tournament. In each round, teams play two games in the same weekend against the other teams. In the second of each pair of games, the pitcher must be eligible for the Spain national baseball team.

Since 2012, after the regular season, the two first qualified team play the Finals in a best-of-five playoffs format. The last qualified is relegated to Primera División A, composed in 2012 by only six teams.

In other way, the first four qualified teams, will play for the Copa del Rey de Béisbol of the next season.

== Current teams ==
Team	Location	Field	Founded
CBS Antorcha	(Valencian Community) Valencia	Camp Municipal de Beisbol i Sofbol de València	1959
Astros Valencia	(Valencian Community) Valencia	Camp Municipal de Beisbol i Sofbol de València	2001
CB Barcelona	(Catalonia) Barcelona	Camp Municipal de Béisbol Carlos Pérez de Rozas	2012
CAD Irabia	(Navarre) Pamplona	Campo de Béisbol José Aguadero	
Béisbol Navarra	(Navarre) Pamplona	Campo de Béisbol José Aguadero	
Toros Pamplona	(Navarre) Pamplona	Campo de Béisbol José Aguadero	
Miralbueno Zaragoza	(Aragon) Zaragoza	Campo Municipal de Béisbol y Sófbol Miralbueno	
San Inazio Beisbol	(Basque Country (autonomous community)) Bilbao	Campo de Béisbol El Fango	1956
CBS Sant Boi	(Catalonia) Sant Boi de Llobregat	Estadio Municipal de Béisbol Antonio Hervás	1971
Tenerife Marlins	(Canary Islands) Santa Cruz de Tenerife	Campo Municipal de Béisbol Néstor Pérez Suárez	1997

División de Honor de Béisbol 2023 teams
Canary Islands

== Champions by season ==
=== Campeonato de España ===
Season	Champion
1944	RCD Espanyol
1945	Real Madrid
1946	FC Barcelona
1947	FC Barcelona
1948	Real Madrid
1949	Atlético Madrid
1950	Real Madrid
1951	Atlético Madrid
1952	Atlético Madrid
1953	RCD Espanyol
1954	Hèrcules Les Corts
1955	Real Madrid
1956	FC Barcelona
1957	Picadero Damm
1958	Hèrcules Les Corts
1959	Real Madrid
1960	Real Madrid
1961	Real Madrid
1962	Picadero Damm
1963	Real Madrid
1964	Picadero JC

Season	Champion
1965	El Corte Inglés de Madrid
1966	Piratas de Madrid
1967	Piratas de Madrid
1968	El Corte Inglés de Madrid
1969	El Corte Inglés de Madrid
1970	Rayo Vallecano
1971	Madrid
1972	Madrid
1973	Condepols
1974	Condepols
1975	Condepols
1976	Johnson de Madrid
1977	Catalunya
1978	Condepols
1979	Condepols
1980	Condepols
1981	Piratas de Madrid
1982	Viladecans
1983	Viladecans
1984	Viladecans
1985	Viladecans

=== División de Honor ===
Season	Champion
1986	Viladecans
1987	Viladecans
1988	Viladecans
1989	Viladecans
1990	Viladecans
1991	Viladecans
1992	Viladecans
1993	Viladecans
1994	Viladecans
1995	Viladecans
1996	Viladecans
1997	Viladecans
1998	Viladecans
1999	Viladecans
2000	Viladecans
2001	Viladecans
2002	Viladecans
2003	Sant Boi
2004	Rojos de Candelaria
2005	Marlins Puerto Cruz
2006	Marlins Puerto Cruz

Season	Champion
2007	Marlins Puerto Cruz
2008	Marlins Puerto Cruz
2009	Marlins Puerto Cruz
2010	Sant Boi
2011	FC Barcelona
2012	Béisbol Barcelona
2013	Marlins Puerto Cruz
2014	Marlins Puerto Cruz
2015	Marlins Puerto Cruz
2016	Valencia Astros
2017	Tenerife Marlins PC
2018	Tenerife Marlins PC
2019	Tenerife Marlins PC
2020	Astros Valencia
2021	Tenerife Marlins PC
2022	Tenerife Marlins PC
2023	Tenerife Marlins PC
2024	Astros Valencia
2025	Tenerife Marlins PC
2026	Tenerife Marlins PC

== Titles by club ==
Club	Titles	Seasons
(Catalonia) Viladecans	21	1982, 1983, 1984, 1985, 1986, 1987, 1988, 1989, 1990, 1991, 1992, 1993, 1994, 1995, 1996, 1997, 1998, 1999, 2000, 2001, 2002
(Canary Islands) Tenerife Marlins	16	2005, 2006, 2007, 2008, 2009, 2013, 2014, 2015, 2017, 2018, 2019, 2021, 2022, 2023, 2025, 2026
(Community of Madrid) Real Madrid	8	1945, 1948, 1950, 1955, 1959, 1960, 1961, 1963
(Community of Madrid) Condepols Madrid	8	1971, 1972, 1973, 1974, 1975, 1978, 1979, 1980
(Catalonia) FC Barcelona	4	1946, 1947, 1956, 2011
(Community of Madrid) Atlético Madrid	3	1949, 1951, 1952
(Community of Madrid) Corte Inglés	3	1965, 1968, 1969
(Catalonia) Picadero Damm	3	1962, 1964, 1973
(Community of Madrid) Piratas de Madrid	3	1966, 1967, 1981
(Valencian Community) Valencia Astros	3	2016, 2020, 2024
(Catalonia) Hèrcules Les Corts	2	1954, 1958
(Catalonia) RCD Espanyol	2	1944, 1953
(Catalonia) Saint Boi	2	2003, 2010
(Community of Madrid) Rayo Vallecano	1	1970
(Catalonia) Catalunya	1	1977
(Canary Islands) Rojos de Candelaria	1	2004
(Catalonia) Béisbol Barcelona	1	2012

== See also ==
- Baseball awards § Spain
