= CB Barcelona =

- Logo

Information
- League: División de Honor
- Location: Barcelona, Spain
- Ballpark: Camp Municipal de Beisbol Carlos Pérez de Rozas
- Founded: 2012
- Copa del Rey championships: 1 (2014)
- League championships: 1 (2012)
- Colors: Red and blue
- Coach: José Luis Riera
- Website: Official site

Club Béisbol Barcelona, commonly known as CB Barcelona, is a División de Honor de Béisbol baseball club located in Barcelona, Catalonia, Spain. The club was formed in February 2012 after breaking from the FC Barcelona sports club.

The club currently play at the Camp Municipal de Beisbol Carlos Pérez de Rozas, located in the Anella Olímpica in Montjuïc, that hosted the 1992 Summer Olympics.

== History ==
Club Béisbol Barcelona was established in February 2012 after FC Barcelona decided to disband its baseball section. In the summer of 2011, the management of FC Barcelona implemented financial cuts to improve the club's finances, which included eliminating the baseball team, deemed "unprofitable", despite the fact that the club had just recently won the 2011 Spanish championship.

FC Barcelona yielded its federative rights to the new baseball club so it could play in the División de Honor de Béisbol, with CB Barcelona being considered the spiritual successor to FC Barcelona Béisbol, using the same colors. Likewise, most of the players that had won the 2011 championship with FC Barcelona remained with the new club as well as the manager Jorge Miqueleiz.

On its debut season, CB Barcelona won the División de Honor championship, the club finished second during the regular season and defeated the Astros de Valencia in the final series 3 games to 1. The team later participated in the CEB Cup contested in Rotterdam as Spanish champions, finishing with a 2–3 record; they defeated Nettuno and Technika Brno, and lost to the Legionäre, Huskies de Rouen and hosts Neptunus.

== Season-by-season ==
Season	League	Finish	Wins	Loses	Win%	GB	Postseason	Ref	Cup	Finish	Result	Ref
2012	División de Honor	2nd	29	7	.806	3.0	Won final series (Astros) 3–1		Copa del Rey	2nd	Lost final (Marlins) 2–3	
2013	División de Honor	2nd	25	7	.781	1.0	No playoffs held		Copa del Rey	2nd	Lost final (Marlins) 4–8	
2014	División de Honor	4th	20	12	.625	6.0	No playoffs held		Copa del Rey	1st	Won final (Marlins) 12–2	
2015	División de Honor	4th	13	15	.464	11.0	No playoffs held		Copa del Rey	4th	Lost semifinal (Marlins) 0–1	
2016	División de Honor	4th	16	12	.571	8.0	No playoffs held		Copa del Rey	4th	Lost semifinal (Marlins) 1–2	
2017	División de Honor	4th	17	11	.607	5.0	No playoffs held		Copa del Rey	3rd	Lost semifinal (Astros) 1–9	
2018	División de Honor	6th	14	18	.438	15.0	No playoffs held		Copa del Rey	3rd	Lost semifinal (Marlins) 3–7	
2019	División de Honor	4th	16	12	.571	9.0	No playoffs held		Copa del Rey	Did not participate		
2020	División de Honor	5th	12	6	.667	5.0	No playoffs held		Copa del Rey	Not held		
2021	División de Honor	7th	9	13	.409	12.0	No playoffs held		Copa del Rey	Did not participate		
2022	División de Honor	6th	10	16	.385	11.0	Did not qualify		Copa del Rey	Did not participate		
2023	División de Honor	8th	13	15	.464	13.0	No playoffs held		Copa del Rey	Did not participate		
2024	División de Honor	5th	11	19	.367	16.0	No playoffs held		Copa del Rey	Did not participate		

== Notable players ==
- (Dominican Republic) (Spain) Wander Encarnación
- (Venezuela) (Spain) Jesús Golindano
- (Cuba) (Spain) Elián Leyva
