= Viladecans =

Town in Catalonia, Spain

- Municipality
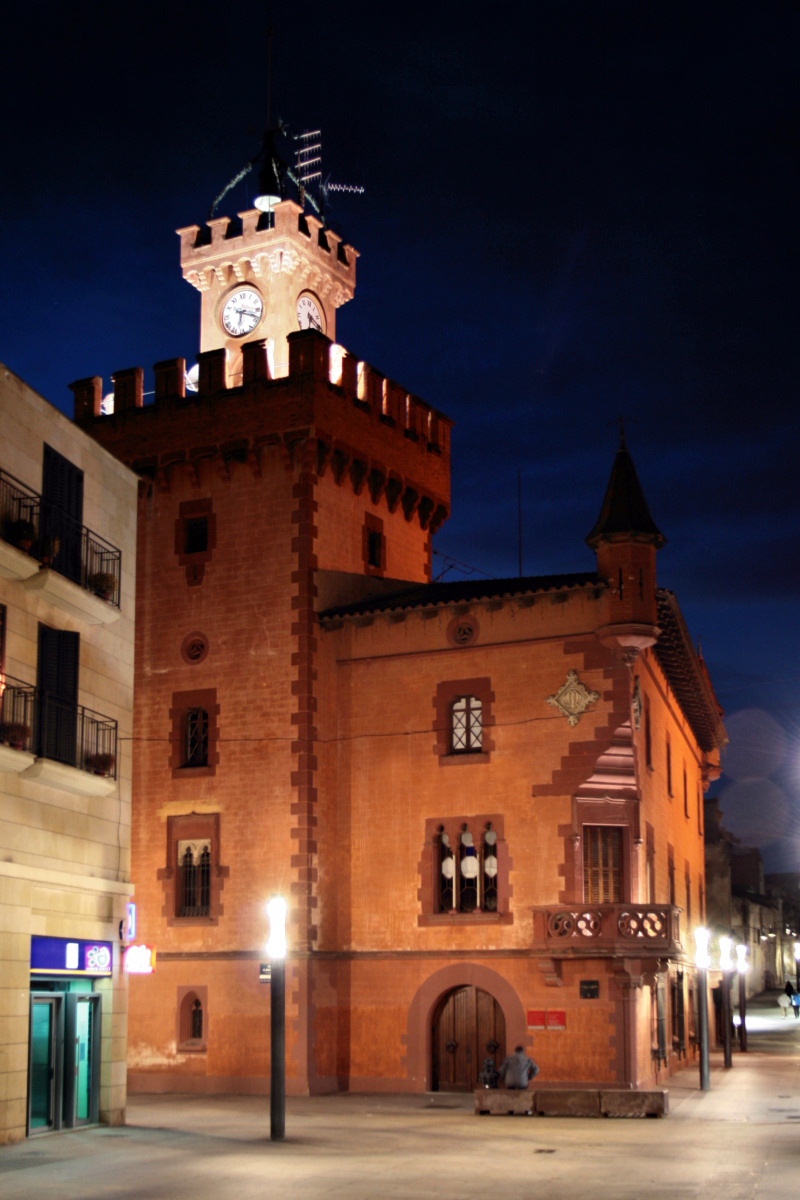
- Town hall, Viladecans

- Flag Coat of arms

- Location in Spain Viladecans (Spain)
- Coordinates: 41°18′57″N 2°01′11″E
- Country: Spain
- Community: Catalonia
- Province: Barcelona
- Comarca: Baix Llobregat

Government
  - Mayor: Olga Morales Segura (2024-)

Area
  - Total: 20.4 km^{2} (7.9 sq mi)
- Elevation: 18 m (59 ft)

Population (2025-01-01)
  - Total: 67,587
  - Density: 3,310/km^{2} (8,580/sq mi)
- Website: viladecans.cat

Viladecans (Catalan pronunciation: [ˌbiləðəˈkans]) is a town near Barcelona, Spain. It is located between Sant Boi de Llobregat and Sant Climent de Llobregat, and is on the coast of the Mediterranean Sea between El Prat de Llobregat and Gavà. It has a hospital, which serves the surrounding towns.

Viladecans has 13 or 14 schools and 30 to 40 sport teams in football, basketball, baseball, softball, gymnastics and other sports.

== Demography ==
This is a table of Viladecans' population demography since 1900.

1900	1930	1950	1970	1986	2005
1194	2990	4294	24,483	45,071	n/a

== Economy ==
Vueling and Level have Viladecans as their registered address.

== Notable residents ==
- Enrique Cortés Pes, Olympic baseball player
- Gervasio Deferr, Olympic gymnast; has lived in Viladecans; now lives in Rubí

== Images ==
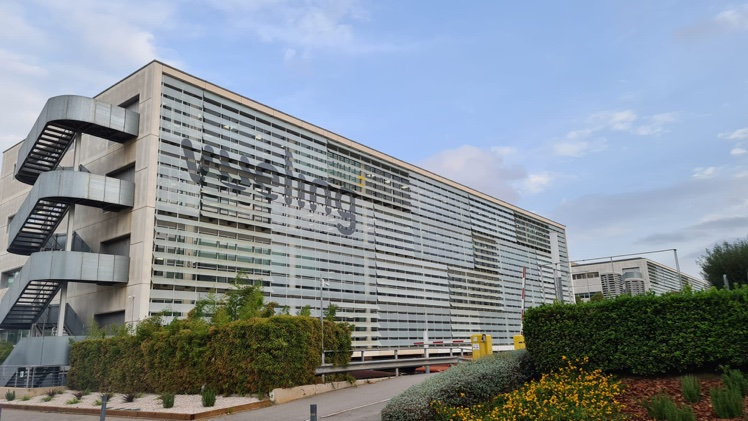
Vueling head office

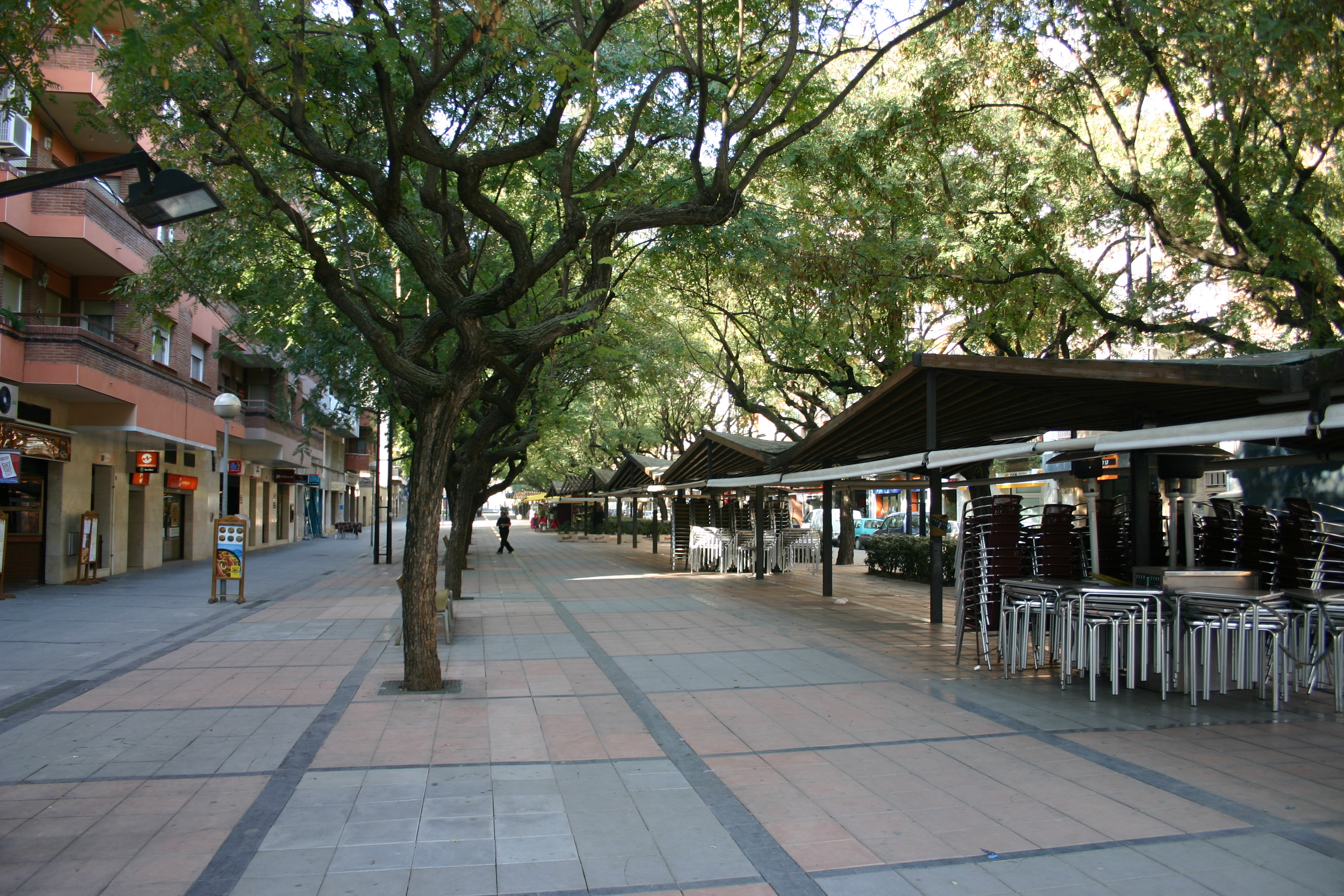
Viladecans

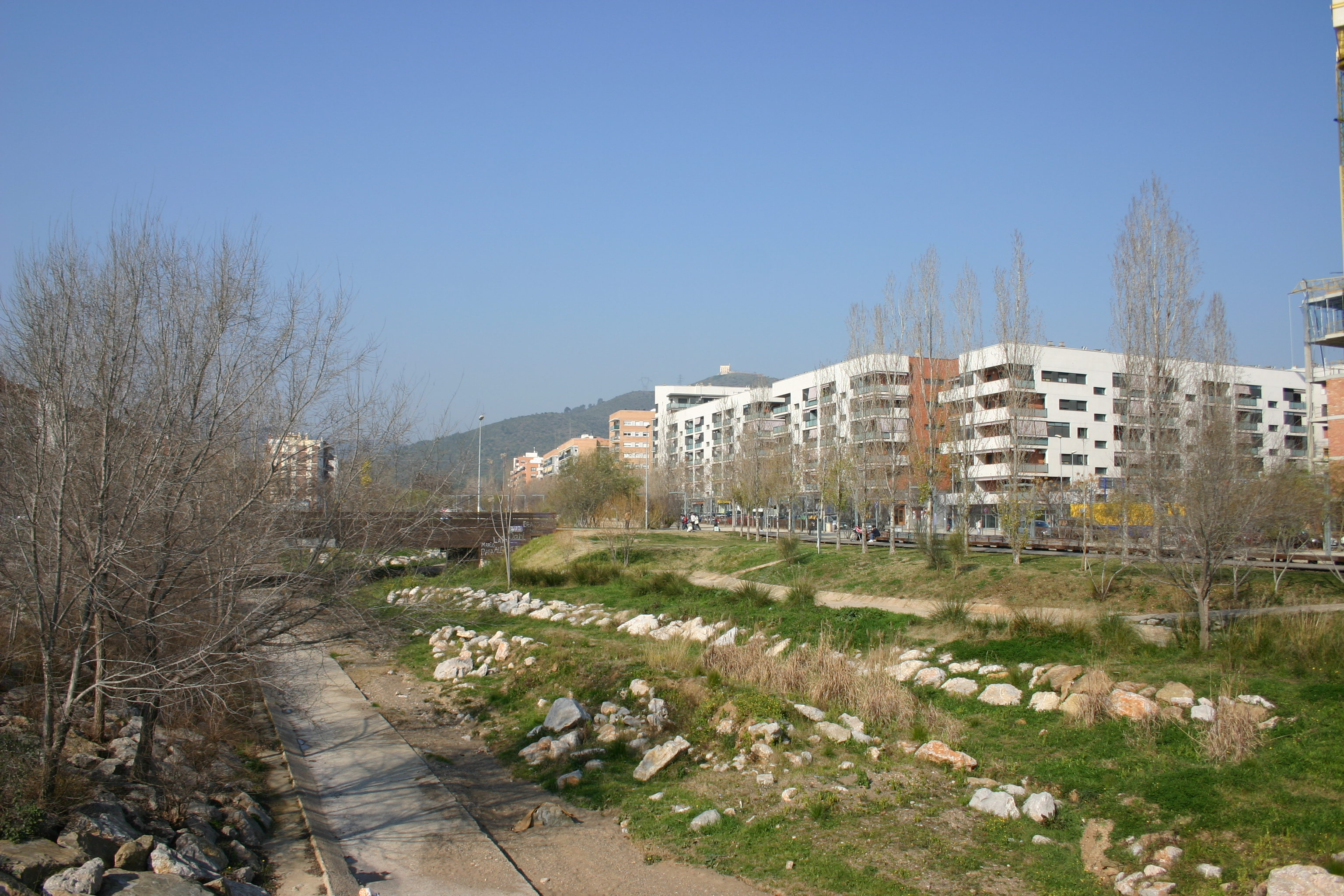
Riera

== See also ==
- CB Viladecans
