= Tenerife Marlins =

Information
- League: División de Honor
- Location: Santa Cruz de Tenerife, Spain
- Ballpark: Centro Insular de Béisbol
- Founded: 1997
- 2019: 25–3 (Champions)
- Colors: Black, teal and white
- Management: Aurelio Antonio da Silva
- Coach: Francisco José González
- Website: marlinspuertocruz.com

Current uniforms
Home	Away

The Marlins Puerto Cruz, also referred to as the Tenerife Marlins, are a baseball team based in Santa Cruz de Tenerife, Spain. They are members of the top division of Spanish Baseball, the Division de Honor de Beisbol.

== History ==
The Marlins Puerto Cruz were founded in 1997 and have enjoyed considerable success in the Spanish and European baseball circuits. The team won the Copa del Rey every year from 2005–2009 and the CEB Cup in 2004. The Junior Team won the 2010 Junior Championship Series.

== Trophies ==
- División de Honor: 12
  - 2005, 2006, 2007, 2008, 2009, 2013, 2014, 2015, 2017, 2018, 2019, 2021
- Copa del Rey: 6
  - 2007, 2009, 2010, 2011, 2012, 2013
- CEB Cup: 1
  - 2004

== Uniforms ==
The team's uniforms and moniker on modeled on those of the Miami Marlins. The team's colors are sky blue and black.
