= CB Viladecans =

Baseball team in Catalonia, Spain

- Logo

Information
- League: División de Honor
- Location: Viladecans, Catalonia
- Ballpark: Estadi Olimpic de Viladecans
- Founded: 1945
- Colors: Black and gold
- Manager: Félix Manuel Cano
- Website: http://www.beisbolviladecans.com/

Current uniforms
Home	Away

Club Béisbol Viladecans is a División de Honor de Béisbol baseball club in Viladecans, Catalonia, Spain. It was founded in 1945 and was one of the most active teams during the heyday of baseball in Spain in the 1950s and 1960s. Club Beisbol Viladecans was one of the few teams that survived the difficult times of the late 1960s and 1970s, when mass-interest in football compromised the viability of other local baseball clubs.

The field of the Club Beisbol Viladecans was officially used during the 1992 Summer Olympics for baseball.

== Trophies ==
- División de Honor: 4
  - 1980, 1985, 1987, 1993
- Copa del Rey: 19
  - 1982, 1983, 1984, 1985, 1986, 1987, 1988, 1989, 1990, 1991, 1992, 1993, 1994, 1995, 1996, 1997, 1998, 1999, 2000

== Awards ==
- In 1957 Club Beisbol Viladecans won the Radio Ciudad de Barcelona Trophy, its first significant victory.
- 21 times Champion of Spain in the senior category from 1982 to 2002.
- Winner of the Spanish Cup in 1982.
- Champion of Spain in the female junior category in 1986.

== Roster ==
CB Viladecans roster
Players		Coaches
Pitchers: 80 Ferrán Cadenas; 70 Daniel Castaño; -- Diego Mendoza; 69 Eric Páez; 5 Francisco Sánchez; 29 Kerson Trinidad	Catchers: -- Adrià Alcaide; 30 Eric Giménez; -- Willian Mendoza; Infielders: 96 Mario Castell; 7 Miguel Catalán; -- Sterlin Cuevas; 3 Anthony Marcelino; 71 Javier Miranda; 1 Maddiel Pérez; 11 Adrián Pérez Rivera; 65 Roberto Valentín; Outfielders: 4 Xavier Cereceda; 28 Iker González; 12 Aleix Moya; -- Juan Núñez; Designated hitters: 97 David Meehan	Manager: 17 Félix Manuel Cano; 45 Edgar Hernández; Coaches: -- Leonel Abreu (coach); -- Braulio Paz (coach); Roster updated on 30 November 2023

== See also ==
- History of baseball outside the United States
