= Cody Cillo =

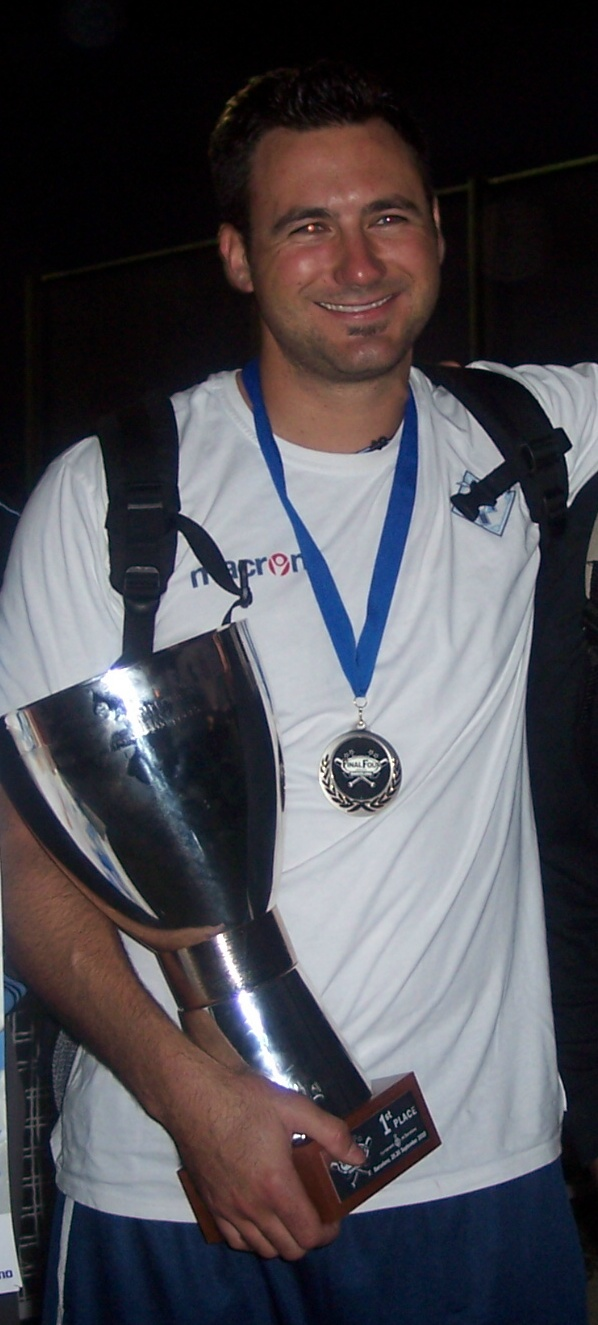

Fortitudo Baseball Bologna – No. 29
- Pitcher
- Born: July 17, 1980 (age 45); Brunswick, Maine, U.S.
- Bats: Right Throws: Right

Career statistics
- Minors: 5-4, 3.06 ERA
- Italy: 27-14, 2.50 ERA
- Independent League: 5-2, 4.73 ERA
- Stats at Baseball Reference

Teams
- GCL Marlins (2003, 2004); Jamestown Jammers (2003); Greensboro Bats (2004); Calgary Vipers (2005, 2009); De Angelis Godo (2006–2007); Fortitudo Baseball Bologna (2008, 2010–2012)

Cody Cillo
Medal record

Men's baseball

Representing Italy

European Baseball Championship
Gold medal – first place	2010 Germany	National team
Gold medal – first place	2012 The Netherlands	National team

Cody Daniel Cillo (born July 17, 1980) is an Italian-American former right-handed sinker-ball/slider pitcher most noted for his time with Fortitudo Baseball Bologna of Federazione Italiana Baseball Sotball Serie A1. He also pitched for the Italian national baseball team that competed in the 2009 World Baseball Classic. He is 6 ft 2 in (1.88 m) tall, and weighs 195 lbs.

== High school & college ==
Cillo lettered in baseball all four years at Olympia High School in Olympia, Washington. His senior year, he was first team all league, and the MVP of the Rivers League. Following two years at Edmonds Community College in Seattle, he went to University of Alabama at Birmingham for his junior year (2002). In 27 appearances, all out of the bullpen, he went 2–2 with three saves for a team that only had seven wins (7-23, 12th in Conference USA).

His senior year, Cillo made five starts, completing one game (23 total appearances). His record improved to 6–5 with four saves—giving Cillo a hand in ten of Birmingham's twelve wins. His 2.90 earned run average was 1.16 lower than the previous season, and .01 better than Brad Sullivan, a fellow Conference USA hurler who would go to the Oakland Athletics in the first round of the 2003 Major League Baseball draft. Cillo went unpicked in that draft and signed as a free agent with the Florida Marlins.

== Minor leagues ==
Cillo split 2003 between the Gulf Coast League Marlins (5.2 IP, 9 strikeouts, 3 saves in 3 games) and the Jamestown Jammers of the New York–Penn League (3-1, 1 save, 2.86 ERA). In 2004, Cillo went 1–0 with a save and a 1.00 ERA for the GCL Marlins and 1–3 with a 5.82 ERA for the South Atlantic League's Greensboro Bats. For the season, he had a 3.60 ERA in 25 appearances.

== Northern League ==
Cillo was released by the Marlins at the end of the 2004 season, and caught on with the Calgary Vipers of the Northern League for their inaugural season, 2005. Cillo's record was 4–2 with a 4.04 ERA and 3 saves for the Vipers, striking out 64 in 62.1 IP. He was traded to the Rockford RiverHawks for Frank James in January 2006, however, he never played for Rockford, making his way to Italy instead.

== Italy ==
In his first season in Federazione Italiana Baseball Sotball in 2006, Cillo was 7–4 with a 2.59 ERA for De Angelis Godo as the team (new to the A1 classification) missed the playoffs by one game. Cillo struck out 90 in 118.2 IP, finishing sixth in the league. He joined the Italian team for the World University Championship. In 2007, Cillo's record fell to 4–4, 3.31 for Godo. He was fifth in Serie A1 with 92.1 innings pitched. In the 2007 Baseball World Cup, Cillo fanned 7 in 6 innings for Italy, going 1–0 with a 1.50 ERA.

Cillo's one win came on November 9, as Italy beat Team USA 6–2. It was the U.S.'s first loss to Italy in 21 years and the first time it ever lost to Italy with professional players, as the team consisted of Major League Baseball players and top minor league prospects. Cillo relieved Luca Panerati in the top of the sixth with a 6–2 lead and pitched two innings of one-hit ball, striking out two, against a lineup that included Evan Longoria, Andy LaRoche, Delwyn Young, Justin Ruggiano, Steve Pearce, Colby Rasmus and Jayson Nix. Though he entered with a lead, Cillo got credit for the win because teenaged starter Matteo D'Angelo had not worked the required number of innings. It was the US's lone loss of the 2007 Baseball World Cup.

Cillo was a member of Fortitudo Baseball Bologna in 2008. Bologna led the league in the win-loss column, with a pitching staff led by four hurlers with ERA below 2.00. Cillo had a 9–1 record in 14 starts, and his 1.34 ERA was second in the league to Telemarket Rimini's Gustavo Martinez (1.17). Cillo finished third in the Miglior Lanciatore Assoluto (Italian equivalent to the Cy Young Award) behind Martinez and T&A San Marino's Tiago DaSilva.

== 2009 World Baseball Classic ==
Cillo once again joined team Italia for the 2009 World Baseball Classic. Prior to the start of the WBC, Italy played two Spring training games against the Washington Nationals and New York Mets. Cillo took the loss in the Nats' 9–6 victory over Italy, giving up a walk off home run to Roger Bernadina. Against the Mets, Cillo pitched one inning, giving up one hit and striking out one in Italy's 3–2 loss.

In the WBC, Cillo made two appearances in Italy's three games, giving up one earned run on a solo home run in one total inning pitched. Following the WBC, Cillo chose not to resign with Bologna, deciding instead to rejoin the Calgary Vipers, now of the Golden Baseball League.

== Return to Fortitudo Bologna ==
In eight innings of work with the Vipers in 2009, Cillo allowed nine runs on twelve hits and six walks. He returned to Fortitudo Bologna for the 2010 season. Fortitudo finished second in the Italian Baseball League, then went on to win the Coppa Italia and the 2010 Final Four. Cillo was also a member of the Italy national baseball team who won the 2010 European Baseball Championship. In 2011, Cillo went 6–4 with a 3.09 ERA and 55 strikeouts.

Pitching out of the bullpen in 2012, Cillo went 2–2 with a 1.19 ERA for the Fortitudo team that went on to win the European Cup. He also won the European Championship with the Italian national team.

== Personal life ==
Cody Cillo is married to Jacquelyn Hill as of May 3, 2025
