= 2010 European Cup (baseball) =

Tournament details
- Countries: Czech Republic; Netherlands
- Dates: 1–6 June
- Teams: 12

The 2010 European Cup was an international baseball competition among the top teams of the professional baseball leagues in Europe, held in the Czech Republic and the Netherlands from June 1 to 6, 2010.

== Teams ==
=== Brno ===
The following 6 teams were qualified for the 2010 European Cup in Brno, Czech Republic.

(Italy); Bologna	Winner of Serie A1
(Czech Republic); Brno	Winner of Extraliga
(Germany); Heidenheim	Winner of Bundesliga
(Netherlands); Hoofddorp	Runner-up of Hoofdklasse
(France); Rouen	Winner of Division Élite
(Spain); Sant Boi de Llobregat	Runner-up of División de Honor

=== Rotterdam ===
The following 6 teams were qualified for the 2010 European Cup in Rotterdam, Netherlands.

(Belgium); Hoboken	Winner of 1st Division
(Italy); Rimini	Runner-up of Coppa Italia
(Netherlands); Rotterdam	Winner of Hoofdklasse
San Marino	Winner of Coppa Italia
(France); Savigny-sur-Orge	Runner-up of Division Élite
(Spain); Puerto de la Cruz	Winner of División de Honor

== Standings ==
Qualified for the 2010 Final Four
Relegation playoffs

=== Brno ===
Teams	W	L	Pct.	GB	Home	Road	Tiebreaker
(Italy) Fortitudo Bologna	4	1	.800	—	2–1	2–0	1–0
(Germany) Heidenheim Heideköpfe	4	1	.800	—	2–1	2–0	0–1
(Netherlands) Konica Minolta Pioniers	2	3	.400	2	1–1	1–2	1–1 (+0.150 TQB)
(Czech Republic) AVG Draci Brno	2	3	.400	2	0–2	2–1	1–1 (+0.116 TQB)
(Spain) Sant Boi	2	3	.400	2	1–2	1–1	1–1 (-0.317 TQB)
(France) Rouen Huskies	1	4	.200	3	0–3	1–1	—

=== Rotterdam ===
Teams	W	L	Pct.	GB	Home	Road	Tiebreaker
(Italy) Telemarket Rimini	5	0	1.000	—	2–0	3–0	—
T&A San Marino	3	2	.600	2	1–1	2–1	—
(Spain) Tenerife Marlins	2	3	.400	3	1–2	1–1	1–1 (+0.712 TQB)
(Netherlands) DOOR Neptunus	2	3	.400	3	0–2	2–1	1–1 (-0.183 TQB)
(Belgium) Hoboken Pioneers	2	3	.400	3	1–2	1–1	1–1 (-0.473 TQB)
(France) Savigny Lions	1	4	.200	4	1–2	0–2	—
