= Stadio Primo Nebiolo =

Stadium in Messina, Sicily, Italy

Coordinates: 38.2243°N 15.5582°E

- Baseball park of Messina
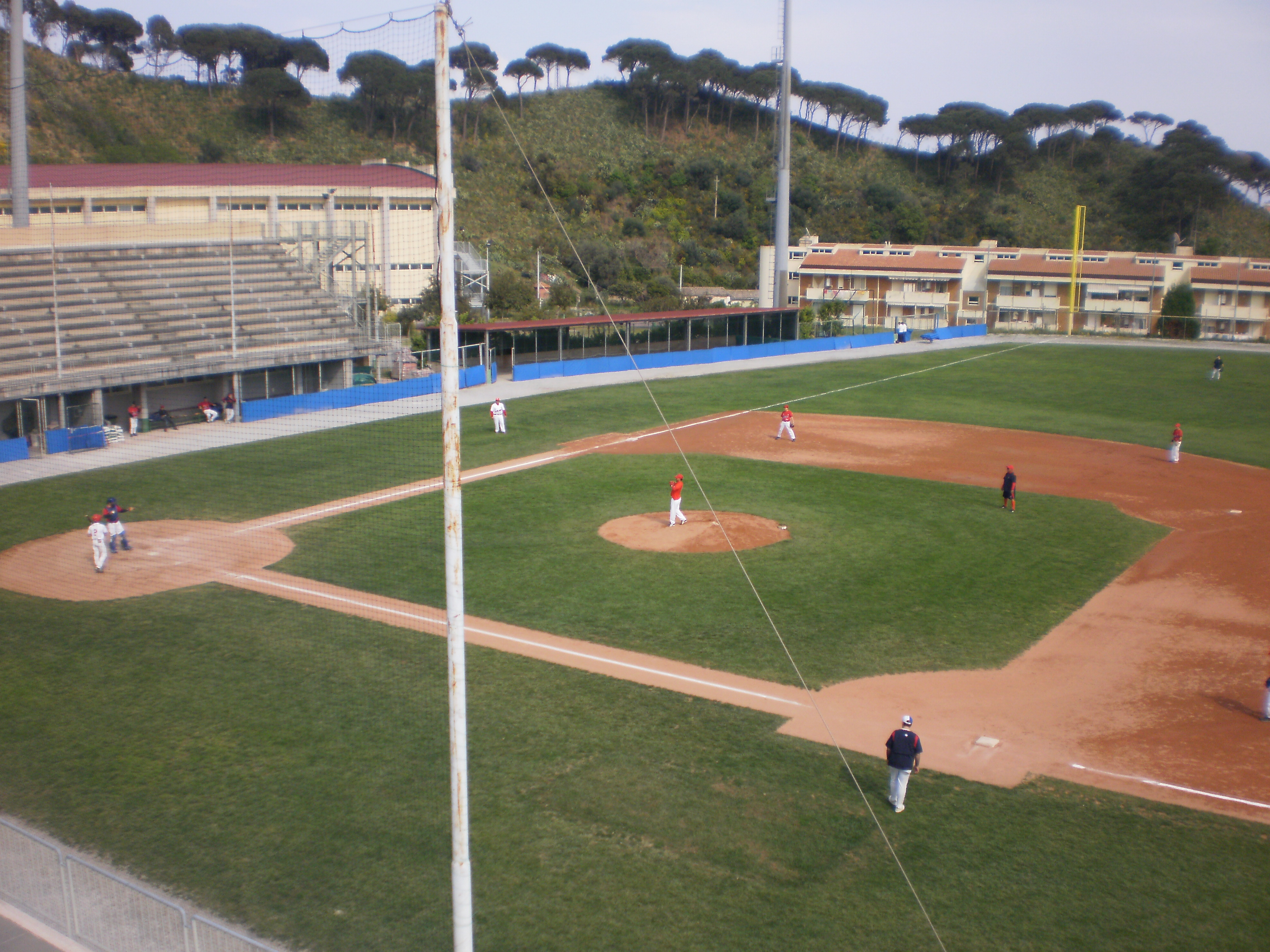
- Interactive map of Stadio Primo Nebiolo
- Location: Viale Annunziata, Conca d'Oro; Messina, 98168
- Owner: University of Messina
- Capacity: 2.800
- Field size: Left Field Line - 98m Center Field - 123m Right Field Line - 98m

Construction
- Opened: 1998

Tenants
- CUS Messina (Serie A federale)

Stadio Primo Nebiolo is a baseball stadium located in Messina, Italy. It was built in 1998, and was named after the former president of the IAAF, Primo Nebiolo. Hosted rounds of the 1998 Baseball World Cup and the same competition in 2009.

== Gallery ==
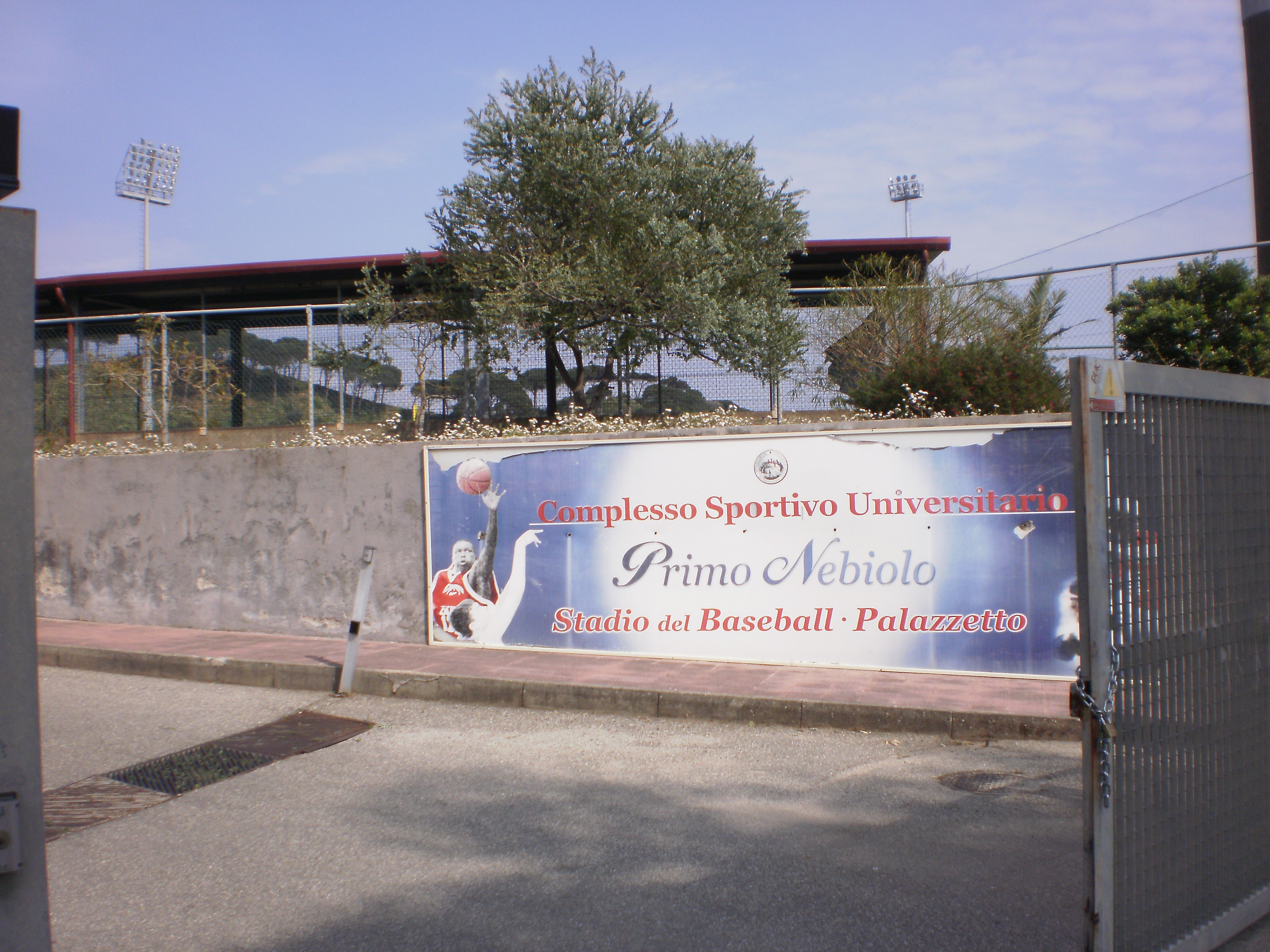
The outside of the stadium

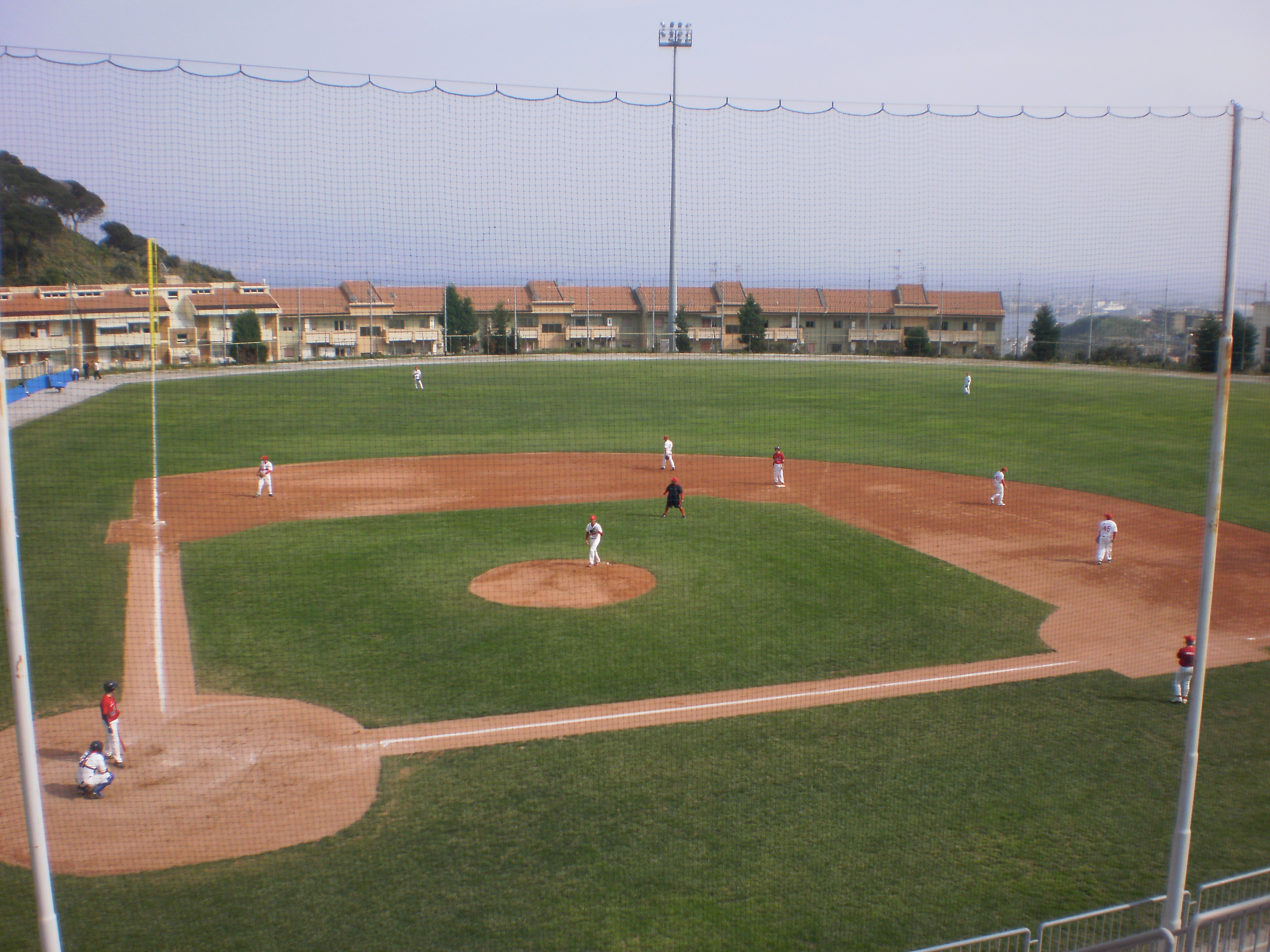
Total view of the field and tribune

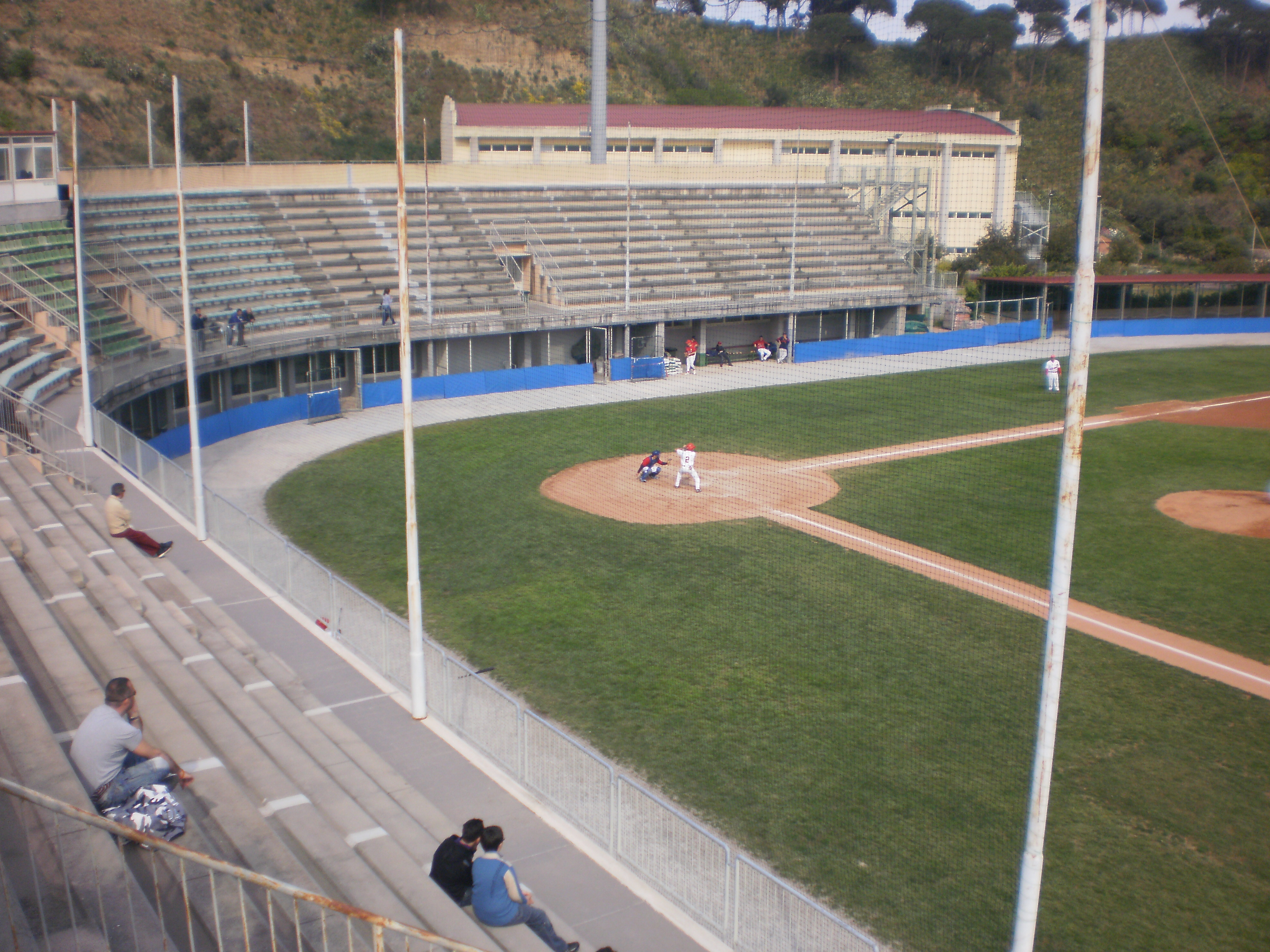
The stands

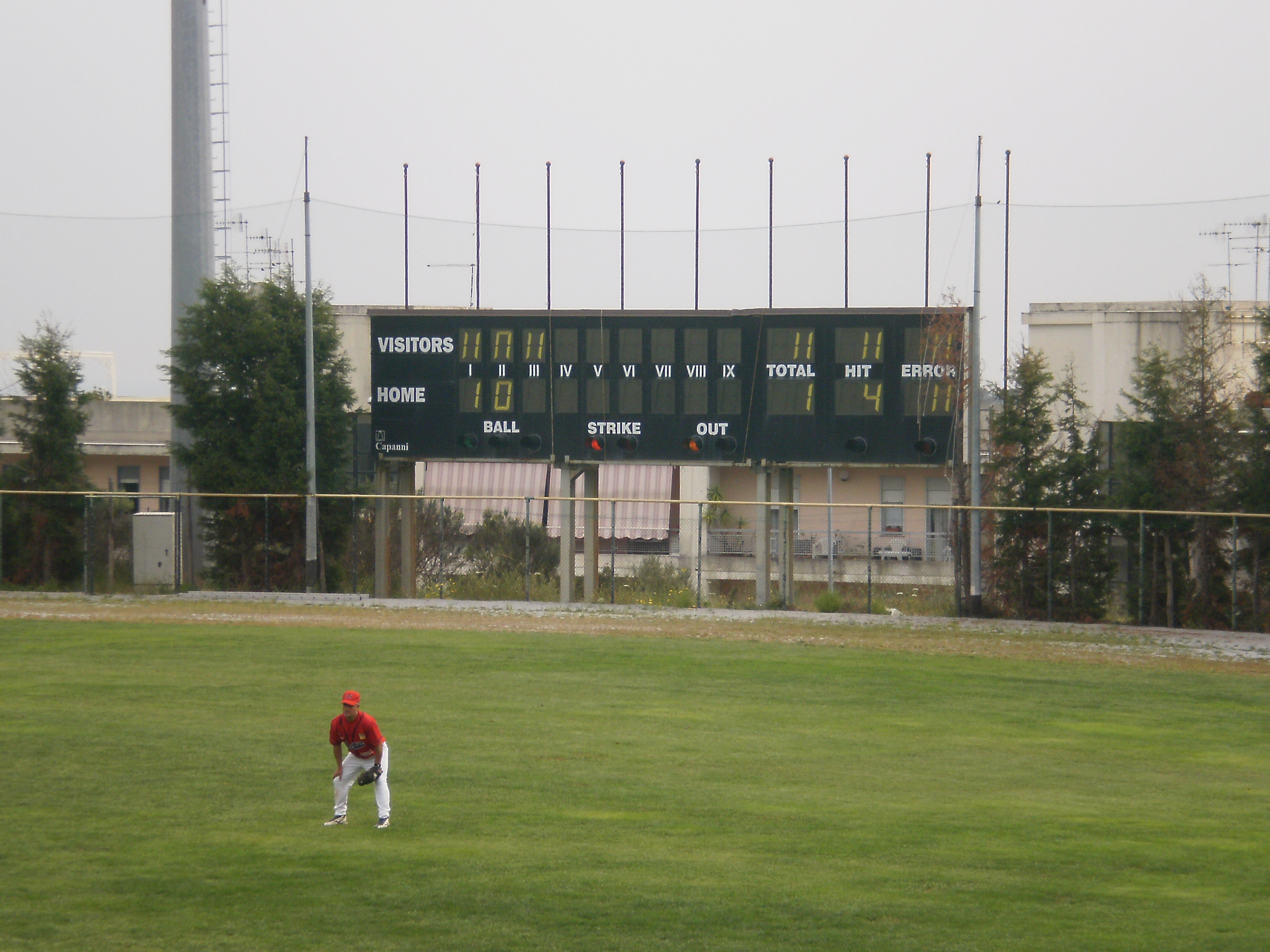
The electronic scoreboard

== See also ==
- 1998 Baseball World Cup
- 2009 Baseball World Cup
