= Lamine Diack =

Senegalese businessman (1933–2021)

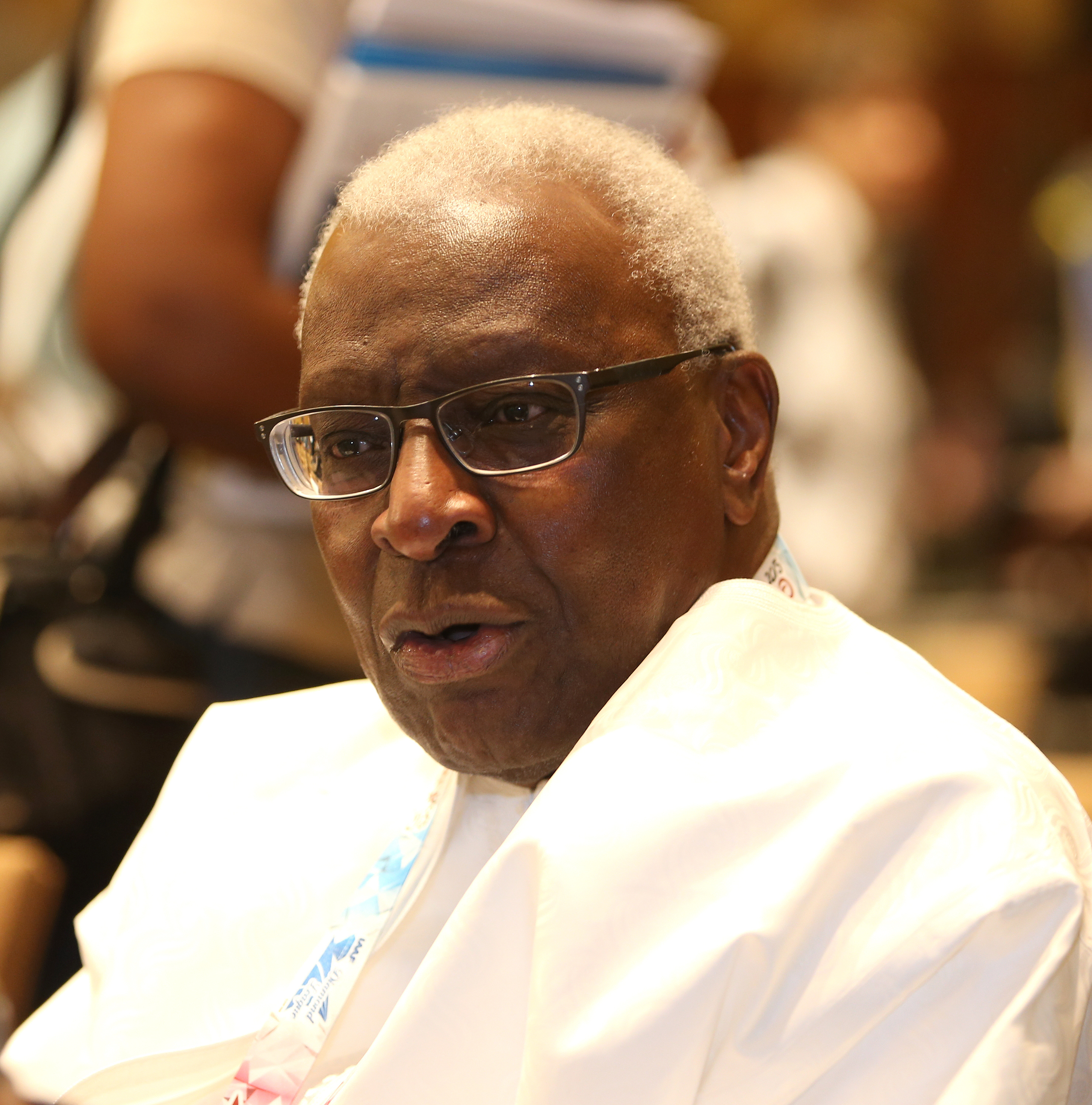
- Diack in 2015
- Born: 7 June 1933; Dakar, French West Africa
- Died: 3 December 2021 (aged 88); Dakar, Senegal
- Title: President of the International Association of Athletics Federations (IAAF)
- Term: 1999–2015
- Predecessor: Primo Nebiolo
- Successor: Sebastian Coe

Lamine Diack (7 June 1933 – 3 December 2021) was a Senegalese businessman, sports administrator, and athlete. He was president of the International Association of Athletics Federations (IAAF) from 1999 to 2015. He was the subject of numerous investigations into corruption during his tenure as president. He was also a member of the International Olympic Committee (IOC) from 1999 to 2013, then an honorary member from 2014 to 2015, and the chairman of the National Water Company "Société Nationale des Eaux" of Senegal (SONES) from 1995 to 2001. He had been under house arrest since November 2015, and his trial in France started in June 2020. On 16 September 2020, Diack, his son Papa Massata Diack, the head of the IAAF anti-doping department Gabriel Dolle, and other persons were given prison sentences for their part in a coverup of doping in Russia.

== Athlete ==
Diack was a champion long jumper in the late 1950s, winning the event at the 1958 French Athletics Championships and holding the French/West African record from 1957 to 1960.

== Political career ==
In addition to his sports administration roles, Diack had a prominent career in Senegalese national and municipal politics. He served as the Secretary of State for Youth and Sports between 1970 and 1973. In 1978, Diack was elected Mayor of Dakar, a position he held until 1980, while concurrently serving as a member of the National Assembly of Senegal in 1978, a position he held until 1993, eventually becoming its Senior Vice-President from 1988 to 1993.

== IAAF ==
Diack became president of the International Association of Athletics Federations (IAAF) on 8 November 1999, and was re-elected for his fourth and final four-year term on 16 October 2011. He was also a member of the International Olympic Committee (IOC).

== Corruption ==
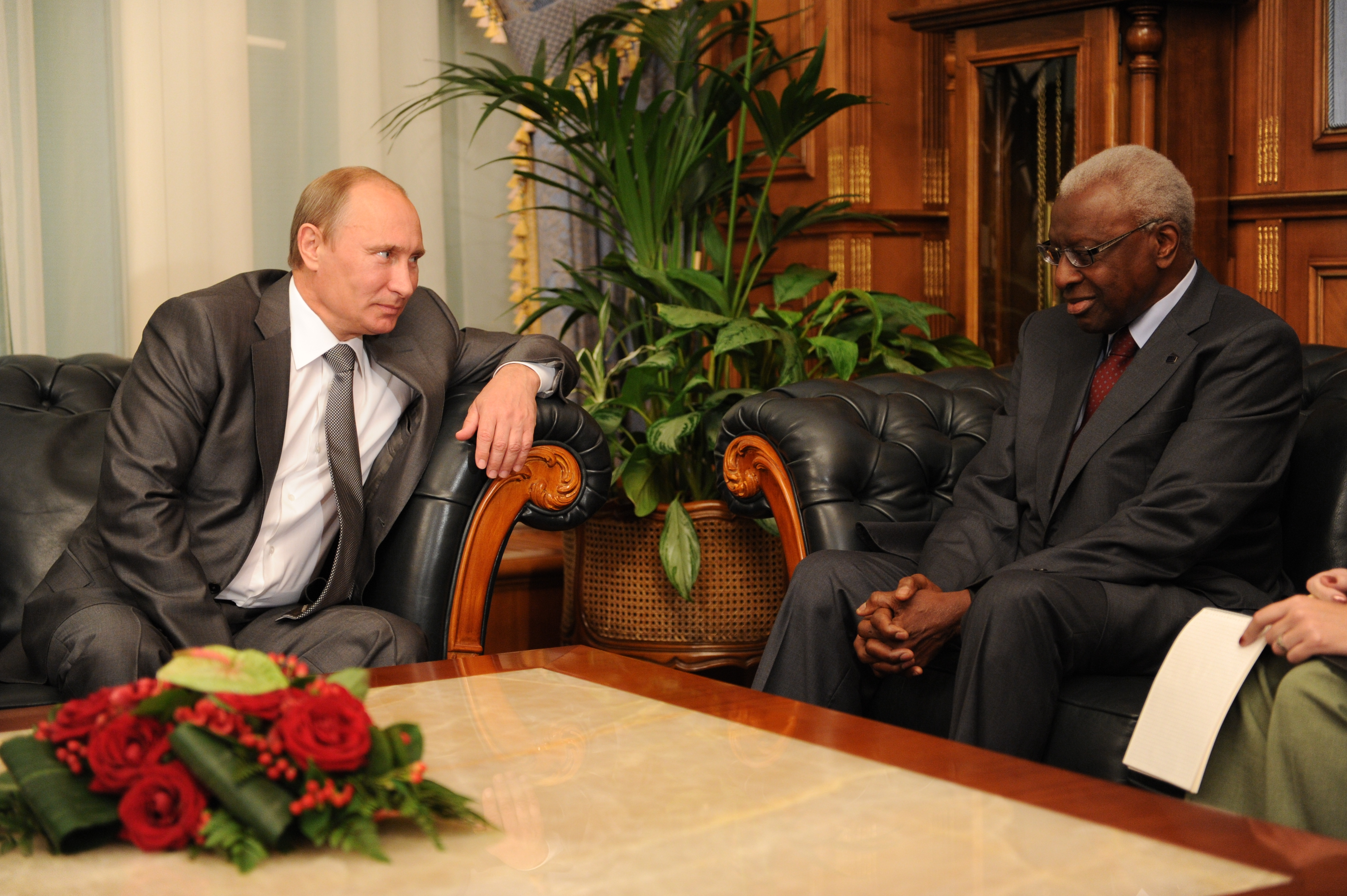
Vladimir Putin and Lamine Diack

In 2011, the ethics committee of the IOC conducted a year-long investigation into claims that Diack had received bribes from the bankrupt sports marketing company International Sport and Leisure (ISL). Diack received three payments in 1993 from ISL at a time when the company was in negotiations with the IAAF to sign a marketing contract. The IOC described Diack as having "placed himself in a conflict of interest situation". Diack claimed that he received the money from supporters after his house burned down. Diack was warned for his behavior, with the fact that he was not a member of IOC at the time of the wrongdoing considered a mitigating factor.

=== Russian Doping Cover-up and "Full Protection" Extortion Scheme ===
In November 2015, Diack and several other top IAAF officials were arrested in France. French financial prosecutors charged Diack with passive corruption, aggravated money laundering, and breach of trust. A subsequent World Anti-Doping Agency (WADA) independent commission revealed that Diack had masterminded a systemic extortion network known as the "Full Protection" scheme. Diack and his inner circle extorted an estimated 3.2 million euros from at least 23 Russian athletes suspected of doping. In exchange for these illicit hush-money payments, their positive drug tests were systematically suppressed, allowing them to compete at the London 2012 Summer Olympics.

Furthermore, investigators established that Diack negotiated a $1.5 million deal with Russian sports officials to fund Macky Sall's 2012 presidential election campaign in Senegal, in exchange for intentionally delaying IAAF anti-doping disciplinary procedures. WADA concluded that Lamine Diack was personally responsible for organizing and enabling the conspiracy that deeply compromised the integrity of track and field. He was charged with "passive corruption" and money laundering by French financial prosecutors. Diack was placed under house arrest in Paris and Gabriel Dollé, the former anti-doping manager at the IAAF, was taken into custody in Nice. The IOC provisionally suspended Diack, and he resigned his position as an IOC Honorary Member.

In 2016, the World Anti-Doping Agency reported that with his influence, Diack was able to install two of his sons and a friend into positions that exerted influence over the IAAF. The report says that Lamine Diack "was responsible for organizing and enabling the conspiracy and corruption that took place in the IAAF." In 2018, Diack was handed an additional charge of "breach of trust" by French prosecutors.

=== 2020 Trial and French Criminal Sentence ===
On 18 June 2020, the trial of Diack and five other people, including his son, concluded. On 16 September 2020, the Paris Criminal Court found Diack guilty on multiple counts of corruption and breach of trust. The 87 year old was sentenced to four years in prison, with two of them suspended, and ordered to pay the maximum legal fine of 500 000 euros.The presiding judge, Rose-Marie Hunault, emphasized that his actions had profundly "undermined the values of athletics and the fight against doping".

His son, Papa Massata Diack, who operated as a core marketing consultant for the IAAF and was a central figure in the extortion racket, refused to surrender to French authorities. Sheltered by Senegal's refusal to extradite its citizens, Papa Massata was tried in absentia (by contumace) and handed a strict five year prison sentence, alongside a 1 million euro fine and a 10 year ban from sports. The court also ordered the co-conspirators to pay 16 million euros in damages to World Athletics for severe reputational and financial harm.

=== IOC Administration and Executive Criticism ===
Despite multiple internal warning signs dating back to the 2011 ISL bribery case, the International Olympic Committee (IOC) and its Ethics Commission faced heavy criticism from transparency advocates for failing to investigate Diack during his 14 year tenure as an active member. The IOC only enacted a provisional suspension after his formal arrest in France forced their hand, leading to his resignation as an honorary member. Following Diack's criminal conviction, IOC President Thomas Bach publicly condemned his former colleague, stating that Diack and his associates had dragged global athletics "into an abyss", despite both men having worked closely together as high-level Olympic executives for over a decade.

=== Olympic bid investigations ===
In March 2016, French financial prosecutors expanded their investigation into corruption in athletics to examine the bidding processes for the 2016 Summer Olympics and the 2020 Summer Olympics. The inquiry followed a World Anti-Doping Agency commission report suggesting that up to US$5 million in sponsorship money may have influenced Diack to support Tokyo rather than Istanbul in the 2020 host-city vote. The International Olympic Committee (IOC) said that it would act on any evidence provided by prosecutors and sought to become a party to the French proceedings.

=== Rio de Janeiro 2016 Bid Rigging ===
In 2019, former Rio de Janeiro governor Sérgio Cabral testified extensively during judicial proceedings that he had paid US$2 million to Diack to secure votes for Rio de Janeiro's successful bid to host the 2016 Olympics. Cabral stated that the funds were funneled through Arthur César de Menezes Soares Filho, an influential Brazilian businessman known as "King Arthur", who acted as the primary financial intermediary. According to Cabral's confession, the bribe bought a voting bloc of up to nine African IOC members, and he explicitly named legendary sports officials Sergey Bubka and Alexander Popov as recipients of the illicit payouts. While both Bubka and Popov fiercely denied the allegations and threatened legal action, international prosecutors mapped these transactions directly to a wider vote-buying apparatus. This investigation eventually resulted in the 30 year criminal prison sentence of Brazilian Olympic Committee President Carlos Arthur Nuzman, who was found guilty of coordinating the scheme alongside Diack.

=== Tokyo 2020 Bidding Inquiry and Japanese fallout ===
French authorities investigated whether payments of more than US$2 million from the Tokyo 2020 bid committee to Black Tidings, a Singapore-based consultancy linked to Diack's son Papa Massata Diack, were bribes intended to influence African IOC members' votes. Japanese officials said that the payments were legitimate consultancy fees. A panel commissioned by the Japanese Olympic Committee concluded that the payments were not bribes, although it admitted that it lacked the legal authority to interview Ian Tan Tong Han, Lamine Diack, or Papa Massata Diack and did not know exactly how the money had been used. Under intense pressure from the mounting French criminal indictment targeting Papa Massata Diack for his role in the Tokyo bidding process, Tsunekazu Takeda, the president of the Japanese Olympic Committee and head of the Tokyo bid, was forced to resign from his sports governance positions in 2019.

== Honours ==
Diack was awarded the Grand-Cordon of the Order of the Rising Sun of Japan in 2007.

== Death ==
Diack died on 3 December 2021, at the age of 88 in Dakar, Senegal, having returned to his home country after his passport was returned upon payment of a bail bond. At the time of his death, his legal teams were actively pursuing appeals against his French criminal conviction, and parallel international judicial requests regarding his asset seizures and cross-border indictments in Brazil remained legally unresolved.

Sporting positions
Preceded by (Italy) Primo Nebiolo	President of the IAAF; 1999–2015	Succeeded by (United Kingdom) Sebastian Coe
