= 2010 Final Four (baseball) =

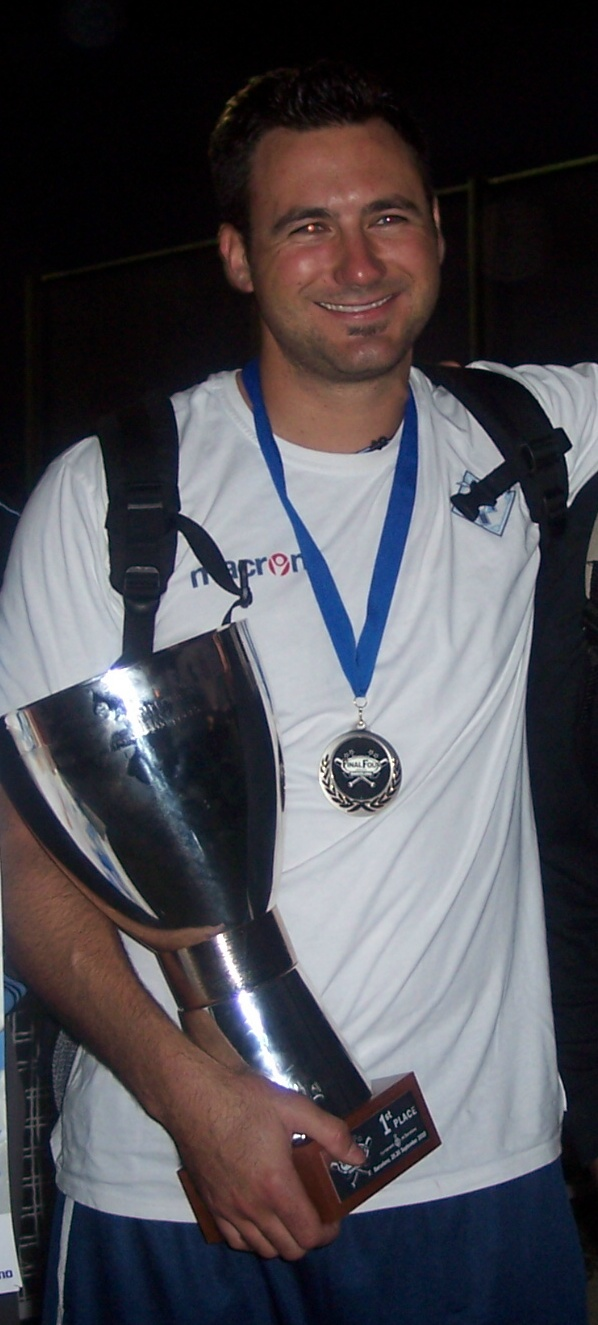
- Cody Cillo of Fortitudo Baseball Bologna holding the Cup

Tournament details
- Country: Spain
- Dates: 25 September – 26 September
- Teams: 4

The 2010 European Champion Cup Final Four was an international baseball competition held in Barcelona, Spain on September 25–26, 2010. It featured the 4 best teams of the 2010 European Cup, and it was won by Fortitudo Baseball Bologna.

== Teams ==
The following four teams qualified for the 2010 Final Four.

(Italy); Fortitudo Bologna	Qualified as #1 in Brno
(Italy); Telemarket Rimini	Qualified as #1 in Rotterdam
(Germany); Heidenheim Heideköpfe	Qualified as #2 in Brno
T&A San Marino	Qualified as #2 in Rotterdam
