= Primo Nebiolo =

Italian sports official and IAAF president

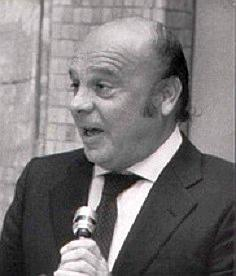
- Nebiolo in the 1970s
- Born: 14 July 1923; Turin, Italy
- Died: 7 November 1999 (aged 76); Rome, Italy
- Occupation: Sports official
- Known for: President, IAAF, 1981–1999

Primo Nebiolo (14 July 1923 – 7 November 1999) was an Italian sports official, best known as former president of the worldwide athletics federation IAAF and the FISU.

Primo Nebiolo was the ideator of the IAAF Continental Cup.

== Biography ==
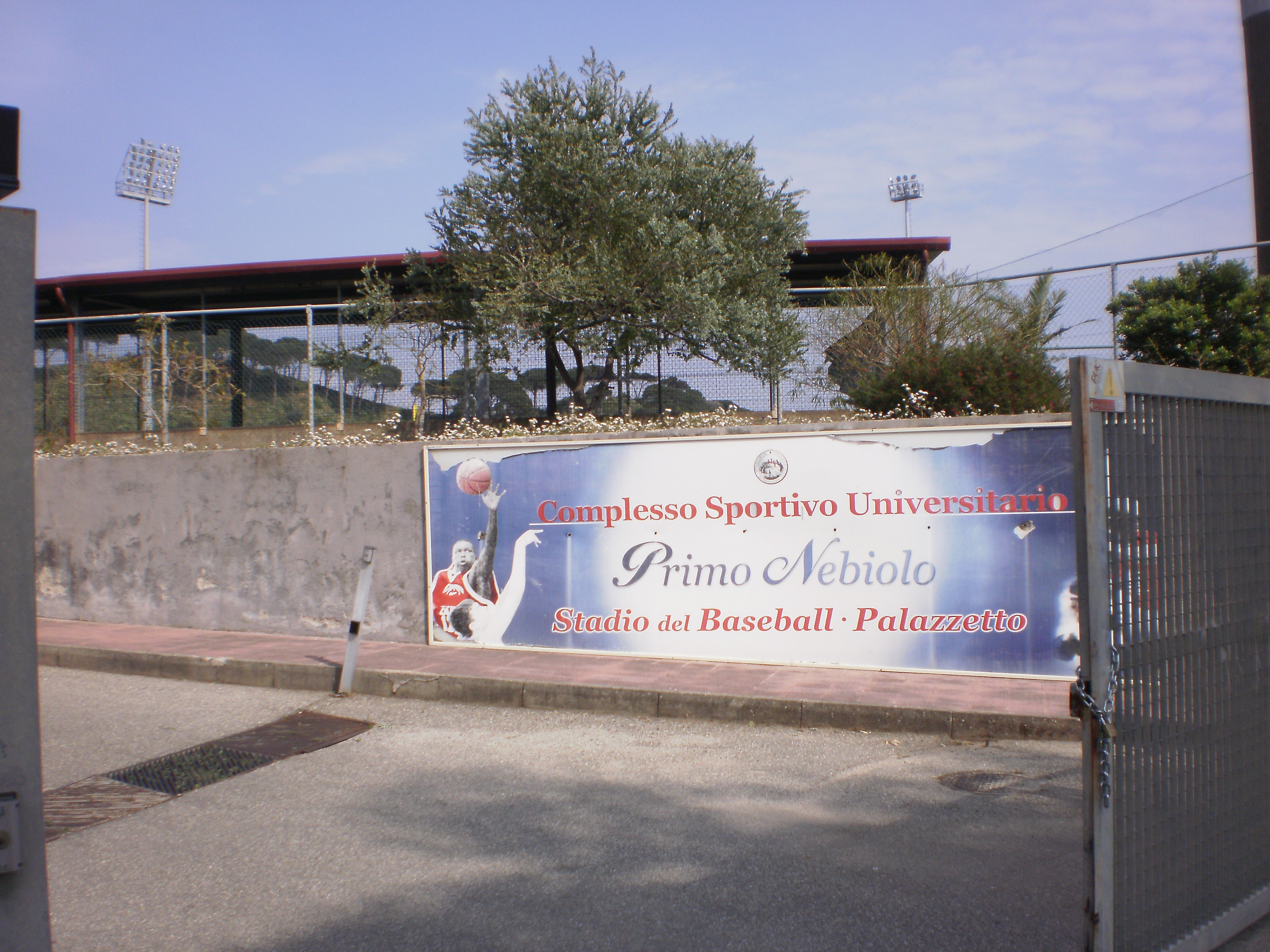
The external of Primo Nebiolo Stadium in Messina

As an active athlete in his younger days, Nebiolo was a long jumper. He later studied law and political science and became a businessman in construction. Between 1961 and his death in 1999, Nebiolo was the president of the International University Sports Federation. From 1969 to 1989 he was the president of the Italian Athletics Federation. He became a member of the IAAF council in 1972 and president of the Association of Summer Olympic International Federations in 1983. He became a member of the International Olympic Committee in 1992. He played a crucial and polemic role as Rome loss to Athens at the bid for the 2004 Summer Olympics, but his work was recognized two years later when he helped his home city Turin to the 2006 Winter Olympics bid win.

In 1981, Nebiolo became president of the International Association of Athletics Federations as a result of Horst Dassler of ISL's desire to gain more influence within the IAAF and to ensure that ISL retained the IAAF's marketing rights. Unsure of his influence with the IAAF president Adriaan Paulen, Dassler saw Nebiolo as a potentially more friendly ally and so put into action a plan to replace Paulen with Nebiolo. With the next presidential vote scheduled to happen in Moscow in 1980, Dassler used the US boycott as an excuse to have it postponed until the IAAF's next congress in Rome the following year, giving him more time to garner support for Nebiolo. He then advised Paulen that it would be wise for him to declare his candidacy early, as it would discourage candidates other than Nebiolo from announcing they were running and potentially diluting Nebiolo's vote. Dassler's last act was to convince Paulen that Nebiolo had already gained too much support for Paulen to win and that in his own interests, he should bow out. Paulen did so allowing Nebiolo to win the IAAF presidency unopposed.

As president Nebiolo oversaw its restructuring from the International Amateur Athletics Federation, as well as the introduction of regular events such as the World Championships and allowed athletes to be paid for their participation and endorsement, however his leadership was dogged by accusations of corruption and scandal. For example, it was alleged that in 1995 Nebiolo unsuccessfully offered Giorgio de Stefani, a life member of the International Olympic Committee, 50 million lire to resign his position, thus opening up a position for Nebiolo on the committee. This was followed in 1997 by accusations related to his alleged rigging of the long jump measurement by Italian officials to ensure that Italy's Giovanni Evangelisti won the bronze medal at the 1987 World Championships in Rome. Although Evangelisti was later stripped of his medal and disciplinary measures were taken against track officials, Nebiolo, managed to retain his position as president.

Nebiolo was also accused of having a lax attitude toward doping. While he oversaw the establishment of IAAF urine testing laboratories and spoke of the need to eject athletes who doped out of athletics, many questioned how high a priority anti-doping measures really were for him.

His term as president ended when he died from a heart attack in 1999. He was succeeded by vice president Lamine Diack as acting president; Diack was later elected president. IOC president Juan Antonio Samaranch described Nebiolo as "one of the greatest leading sportsmen of this century". However, in contrast Italy's 1960 200 metres Olympic champion Livio Berruti, described Nebiolo as a person "who trampled over and polluted the sporting ideals that I believed in and which young people today believe in as well. Unfortunately, it is death that has removed Nebiolo from sport and not a movement from within the sporting world itself to defend certain basic rules such as respect, justice, impartiality and love. These are values which were amply forgotten by Primo Nebiolo."

The Stadio Primo Nebiolo was named in his honour. A street in Bucharest, the capital of Romania, is named after him.

== See also ==
- IAAF Continental Cup
- Memorial Primo Nebiolo
- Stadio Primo Nebiolo

== Notes ==
- Goldstein, Richard (8 November 1999). "Primo Nebiolo Is Dead at 76; Led World Track Federation". The New York Times.

Sporting positions
| Preceded by (Netherlands) Adriaan Paulen | Presidents of the IAAF; 1981–1999 | Succeeded by (Senegal) Lamine Diack |
