= 2009 Baseball World Cup =

Tournament details
- Countries: Croatia; Czech Republic; Germany; Italy; Netherlands; San Marino; Spain; Sweden
- Dates: 9–27 September
- Teams: 22
- Defending champions: United States

Final positions
- Champions: United States (4th title)
- Runners-up: Cuba
- Third place: Canada
- Fourth place: Puerto Rico

Tournament statistics
- Games played: 92
- Attendance: 126,799 (1,378 per game)

Awards
- MVP: (United States) Justin Smoak
- All statistics correct as of 27 September 2009.

The 2009 Baseball World Cup (BWC) was the 38th international men's amateur baseball tournament. The tournament was sanctioned by the International Baseball Federation, which titled it the Amateur World Series from the 1938 tournament through the 1986 AWS. The 2009 tournament was held, for the first time, across a continent — with games played in 27 cities across eight European countries, from September 9 to 27. The final was a repeat of the previous BWC final, with the United States again defeating Cuba, winning its fourth title. Canada won the bronze medal, the nation's first medal in the tournament, after defeating Puerto Rico 6–2.

There were 22 participating countries (which stands as the most ever in tournament history), with 20 teams split into five groups for the first round, after which "official" host Italy and 2007 European Champion Netherlands joined the advancing 14 teams in the second round.

The next competition would be the last amateur championship held as the BWC tournament, which was replaced in 2015 by the quadrennial WBSC Premier12.

== Format ==
Previous editions of the World Cup were held with no more than 18 teams. These teams were initially broken up into two pools, with the top teams from each pool qualifying for the final knockout stage. With 22 teams competing in the 2009 tournament, the format has been expanded into three phases. Teams that play from the first round and finish among the top eight teams of the tournament will now have played as many as 15 games, making it one of the longest campaigns for any international baseball tournament.

All of the teams, with the exception of Italy and Netherlands, will compete in the first round (as hosts for the second-round games, Italy and Netherlands receive a bye through the first round). The teams will be broken into five pools of four teams each. Each pool will be held in a different country, with the hosts Czech Republic, Spain, Sweden, Croatia and Germany assigned to the corresponding pools. (Previously, Russia had been set as the host nation for Pool D, however they were replaced by Croatia in an announcement from the IBAF.) Unlike the 2009 World Baseball Classic, the pools will be conducted in single round-robin format. The top two teams from each pool will automatically qualify for the second round, while four of the five third-place finishers will also qualify as wild cards. In some respects, the first round is like a final qualifying tournament, similar to the format used for the 2008 Beijing Olympics.

The second round operates similarly to the first, but on an expanded scale. The field of teams is split into two pools, one hosted in Italy, the other in the Netherlands. The fourteen qualifiers from the first round are assigned to the pools, and commence a single round-robin competition. The top four teams from each pool then qualify for the third and final round.

The third round is broken into two parts: a partial round-robin and then four classification games, including the final. Each team will play four games during the round-robin phase, against the teams they have not yet faced (in Round 2) who also qualified – i.e. the teams from the Italian pool will face the teams from the Netherlands pool, but not each other. The teams are then ranked on their results in this phase and in games of the 2nd round between qualified teams, but in two groups based on the pool they qualified from. Each team then plays a classification game against their counterpart from the opposite group to determine their final placings in the tournament – i.e. the fourth place Italian qualifier faces the fourth place Netherlands qualifier to determine seventh and eighth positions, the third place qualifiers compete for fifth and sixth positions, and so on. The winner of the final classification game will be declared the winner of the World Cup for 2009.

=== Tiebreaking procedures ===
The IBAF employs a standard tiebreaking system across all tournaments it sanctions, though it will use a modified version for this World Cup. Ordinarily there are five criteria available to be used when two or more teams finish the tournament (or a section thereof) with the same winning percentage; if the first method does not split the teams involved, the next one is used, continuing down the list of methods until a distinction is achieved. The criteria used to determine the higher placed finishing team, in order, are:

1. the team with the better head-to-head record for the teams involved
2. the team with the better ratio of runs allowed per fielding inning subtracted from the ratio of runs scored per batting inning, referred to as the "Team Quality Balance", from the games involving the tied teams
3. the team with the better "Earned Run Team Quality Balance" – the same as No. 2 but using only earned runs as opposed to all runs
4. the team with the highest batting average from the head-to-head games
5. a coin flip.

For this World Cup though, a simplified method of tiebreaking will be used:

1. the team with the better head-to-head record for the teams involved
2. the team with the fewest runs allowed
3. the team with the lowest earned run average
4. the team with the highest batting average.

In the case of determining the four wild card teams that will progress from the first to the second round, the first measure will automatically be skipped, as it will be impossible for the teams to have played against each other.

== Teams ==
Twenty-two teams qualified for the tournament, either through finishing high enough in the 2007 World Cup, placing high enough in regional tournaments that doubled as qualifying tournaments for the event, or by automatic qualification by hosting some part of the tournament.

Round 1
Pool A		Pool B		Pool C		Pool D		Pool E	
Australia	6th, 2007 World Cup	Cuba	2007 World Cup	Canada	Qualified, 2008 Olympics	Croatia	Replacing Russia, Host nation	China	Qualified, 2008 Olympics
Chinese Taipei	Qualified, 2008 Olympics	Puerto Rico	2008 Americas; Baseball Cup	Netherlands Antilles	4th, 2008 Americas; Baseball Cup	Great Britain	2007 European; Championship	Germany	4th, 2007 European; Championship
Czech Republic	Host nation	South Africa	African qualifier	South Korea	5th, 2007 World Cup	Japan	2007 World Cup	United States	2007 World Cup
Mexico	2008 Americas; Baseball Cup	Spain	2007 European; Championship	Sweden	Host nation	Nicaragua	2008 Americas; Baseball Cup	Venezuela	5th, 2008 Americas; Baseball Cup
Round 2
Pool F					Pool G				
Netherlands		2007 European Championship			Italy		Host nation		

== Round 1 ==
=== Group A ===
Qualified for the 2nd round
Qualified for the 2nd round as wild card

Team	W	L	R	RA	PCT
Mexico	3	0	27	9	1.000
Australia	2	1	33	19	.667
Chinese Taipei	1	2	15	16	.333
Czech Republic	0	3	5	36	.000

9 September 2009	Czech Republic	4–17	Australia	Prague, Czech Republic; Attendance: 800
9 September 2009		Boxscore		Prague, Czech Republic; Attendance: 800

10 September 2009	Chinese Taipei	0–8	Mexico	Prague, Czech Republic; Attendance: 700
10 September 2009		Boxscore		Prague, Czech Republic; Attendance: 700

11 September 2009	Australia	7–5	Chinese Taipei	Prague, Czech Republic; Attendance: 1,000
11 September 2009		Boxscore		Prague, Czech Republic; Attendance: 1,000

11 September 2009	Mexico	9–0	Czech Republic	Prague, Czech Republic; Attendance: 1,200
11 September 2009		Boxscore		Prague, Czech Republic; Attendance: 1,200

12 September 2009	Australia	9–10	Mexico	Prague, Czech Republic; Attendance: 2,500
12 September 2009		Boxscore		Prague, Czech Republic; Attendance: 2,500

12 September 2009	Czech Republic	1–10	Chinese Taipei	Prague, Czech Republic; Attendance: 2,500
12 September 2009		Boxscore		Prague, Czech Republic; Attendance: 2,500

=== Group B ===
Qualified for the 2nd round
Qualified for the 2nd round as wild card

Team	W	L	R	RA	PCT
Cuba	3	0	25	9	1.000
Puerto Rico	2	1	17	13	.667
Spain	1	2	22	10	.333
South Africa	0	3	5	37	.000

9 September 2009	Spain	15 – 0 (F/6)	South Africa	Barcelona, Spain; Attendance: 350
9 September 2009		Boxscore		Barcelona, Spain; Attendance: 350

10 September 2009	Puerto Rico	0 – 10 (F/7)	Cuba	Barcelona, Spain; Attendance: 1,500
10 September 2009		Boxscore		Barcelona, Spain; Attendance: 1,500

11 September 2009	Cuba	10–5	South Africa	Barcelona, Spain; Attendance: 500
11 September 2009		Boxscore		Barcelona, Spain; Attendance: 500

11 September 2009	Spain	3–5	Puerto Rico	Barcelona, Spain; Attendance: 1,500
11 September 2009		Boxscore		Barcelona, Spain; Attendance: 1,500

12 September 2009	Cuba	5–4	Spain	Barcelona, Spain; Attendance: 1,500
12 September 2009		Boxscore		Barcelona, Spain; Attendance: 1,500

12 September 2009	South Africa	0 – 12 (F/7)	Puerto Rico	Barcelona, Spain; Attendance: 150
12 September 2009		Boxscore		Barcelona, Spain; Attendance: 150

=== Group C ===
Qualified for the 2nd round
Qualified for the 2nd round as wild card

Team	W	L	R	RA	PCT
Canada	3	0	43	2	1.000
Netherlands Antilles	2	1	19	28	.667
South Korea	1	2	11	19	.333
Sweden	0	3	10	34	.000

9 September 2009	Sweden	8–10	Netherlands Antilles	Sundbyberg, Sweden; Attendance: 1,223
9 September 2009		Boxscore		Sundbyberg, Sweden; Attendance: 1,223

10 September 2009	Canada	9–1	South Korea	Sundbyberg, Sweden; Attendance: 662
10 September 2009		Boxscore		Sundbyberg, Sweden; Attendance: 662

11 September 2009	South Korea	5–1	Sweden	Sundbyberg, Sweden; Attendance: 1,307
11 September 2009		Boxscore		Sundbyberg, Sweden; Attendance: 1,307

11 September 2009	Netherlands Antilles	0 – 15 (F/7)	Canada	Sundbyberg, Sweden; Attendance: 1,408
11 September 2009		Boxscore		Sundbyberg, Sweden; Attendance: 1,408

12 September 2009	South Korea	5–9	Netherlands Antilles	Sundbyberg, Sweden; Attendance: 1,722
12 September 2009		Boxscore		Sundbyberg, Sweden; Attendance: 1,722

12 September 2009	Sweden	1 – 19 (F/5)	Canada	Sundbyberg, Sweden; Attendance: 2,091
12 September 2009		Boxscore		Sundbyberg, Sweden; Attendance: 2,091

=== Group D ===
Qualified for the 2nd round
Qualified for the 2nd round as wild card

Team	W	L	R	RA	PCT
Nicaragua	3	0	28	5	1.000
Japan	2	1	26	18	.667
Great Britain	1	2	11	20	.333
Croatia	0	3	5	27	.000

10 September 2009	Great Britain	7–9	Japan	Zagreb, Croatia; Attendance: 180
10 September 2009		Boxscore		Zagreb, Croatia; Attendance: 180

10 September 2009	Croatia	1–10	Nicaragua	Zagreb, Croatia; Attendance: 450
10 September 2009		Boxscore		Zagreb, Croatia; Attendance: 450

11 September 2009	Nicaragua	10 – 0 (F/7)	Great Britain	Zagreb, Croatia; Attendance: 150
11 September 2009		Boxscore		Zagreb, Croatia; Attendance: 150

11 September 2009	Japan	13 – 3 (F/7)	Croatia	Zagreb, Croatia; Attendance: 400
11 September 2009		Boxscore		Zagreb, Croatia; Attendance: 400

12 September 2009	Japan	4–8	Nicaragua	Zagreb, Croatia; Attendance: 380
12 September 2009		Boxscore		Zagreb, Croatia; Attendance: 380

12 September 2009	Croatia	1–4	Great Britain	Zagreb, Croatia; Attendance: 600
12 September 2009		Boxscore		Zagreb, Croatia; Attendance: 600

=== Group E ===
Qualified for the 2nd round

Team	W	L	R	RA	PCT
Venezuela	3	0	42	12	1.000
United States	2	1	26	14	.667
Germany	1	2	16	22	.333
China	0	3	3	39	.000

9 September 2009	Germany	14 – 1 (F/7)	China	Regensburg, Germany; Attendance: 5,300
9 September 2009		Boxscore		Regensburg, Germany; Attendance: 5,300

10 September 2009	United States	9 – 13 (F/11)	Venezuela	Regensburg, Germany; Attendance: 4,200
10 September 2009		Boxscore		Regensburg, Germany; Attendance: 4,200

11 September 2009	Venezuela	17 – 2 (F/5)	China	Regensburg, Germany; Attendance: 6,100
11 September 2009		Boxscore		Regensburg, Germany; Attendance: 6,100

11 September 2009	United States	9–1	Germany	Regensburg, Germany; Attendance: 9,600
11 September 2009		Boxscore		Regensburg, Germany; Attendance: 9,600

12 September 2009	China	0–8	United States	Regensburg, Germany; Attendance: 5,900
12 September 2009		Boxscore		Regensburg, Germany; Attendance: 5,900

12 September 2009	Germany	1 – 12 (F/8)	Venezuela	Regensburg, Germany; Attendance: 6,900
12 September 2009		Boxscore		Regensburg, Germany; Attendance: 6,900

=== Wild cards ===
Qualified for the 2nd round as wild card

Team	Pool	W	L	R	RA	PCT
Spain	B	1	2	22	10	.333
Chinese Taipei	A	1	2	15	16	.333
South Korea	C	1	2	11	19	.333
Great Britain	D	1	2	11	20	.333
Germany	E	1	2	16	22	.333

== Round 2 ==
=== Group F ===
Qualified for the 3rd round

Team	W	L	R	RA	PCT	1st Tiebreaker Head–to–head record	2nd Tiebreaker Head–to–head runs allowed	3rd Tiebreaker Head–to–head record
Netherlands	6	1	44	23	.857	1–1	7	1–0
Puerto Rico	6	1	46	16	.857	1–1	7	0–1
Cuba	6	1	42	10	.857	1–1	8	—
Venezuela	3	4	26	37	.429	1–0	—	—
South Korea	3	4	30	24	.429	0–1	—	—
Nicaragua	2	5	24	48	.333	1–0	—	—
Spain	2	5	31	47	.286	0–1	—	—
Great Britain	0	7	12	50	.000	—	—	—

13 September 2009	Netherlands	4–2	South Korea	Amsterdam, Netherlands; Attendance: 3,500
13 September 2009		Boxscore		Amsterdam, Netherlands; Attendance: 3,500

13 September 2009	Cuba	6–0	Great Britain	Haarlem, Netherlands; Attendance: 327
13 September 2009		Boxscore		Haarlem, Netherlands; Attendance: 327

13 September 2009	Venezuela	7–4	Nicaragua	Rotterdam, Netherlands; Attendance: 250
13 September 2009		Boxscore		Rotterdam, Netherlands; Attendance: 250

13 September 2009	Puerto Rico	12 – 2 (F/7)	Spain	Amsterdam, Netherlands; Attendance: 211
13 September 2009		Boxscore		Amsterdam, Netherlands; Attendance: 211

14 September 2009	South Korea	15 – 5 (F/8)	Great Britain	Amsterdam, Netherlands; Attendance: 91
14 September 2009		Boxscore		Amsterdam, Netherlands; Attendance: 91

14 September 2009	Spain	8–1	Venezuela	Amsterdam, Netherlands; Attendance: 61
14 September 2009		Boxscore		Amsterdam, Netherlands; Attendance: 61

14 September 2009	Nicaragua	1–4	Cuba	Haarlem, Netherlands; Attendance: 350
14 September 2009		Boxscore		Haarlem, Netherlands; Attendance: 350

14 September 2009	Netherlands	5–2	Puerto Rico	Rotterdam, Netherlands; Attendance: 2,041
14 September 2009		Boxscore		Rotterdam, Netherlands; Attendance: 2,041

16 September 2009	Puerto Rico	3–2	South Korea	Rotterdam, Netherlands; Attendance: 251
16 September 2009		Boxscore		Rotterdam, Netherlands; Attendance: 251

16 September 2009	Great Britain	1–4	Nicaragua	Rotterdam, Netherlands; Attendance: 112
16 September 2009		Boxscore		Rotterdam, Netherlands; Attendance: 112

16 September 2009	Spain	5–10	Netherlands	Haarlem, Netherlands; Attendance: 2,500
16 September 2009		Boxscore		Haarlem, Netherlands; Attendance: 2,500

16 September 2009	Cuba	10 – 0 (F/8)	Venezuela	Amsterdam, Netherlands; Attendance: 479
16 September 2009		Boxscore		Amsterdam, Netherlands; Attendance: 479

17 September 2009	Puerto Rico	3–2	Great Britain	Haarlem, Netherlands; Attendance: 1,477
17 September 2009		Boxscore		Haarlem, Netherlands; Attendance: 1,477

17 September 2009	Netherlands	8–5	Venezuela	Haarlem, Netherlands; Attendance: 3,117
17 September 2009		Boxscore		Haarlem, Netherlands; Attendance: 3,117

17 September 2009	Spain	0–10	Cuba	Amsterdam, Netherlands; Attendance: 108
17 September 2009		Boxscore		Amsterdam, Netherlands; Attendance: 108

17 September 2009	Nicaragua	2–7	South Korea	Rotterdam, Netherlands; Attendance: 400
17 September 2009		Boxscore		Rotterdam, Netherlands; Attendance: 400

18 September 2009	Spain	5–9	Nicaragua	Amsterdam, Netherlands; Attendance: 300
18 September 2009		Boxscore		Amsterdam, Netherlands; Attendance: 300

18 September 2009	Cuba	2–5	Puerto Rico	Amsterdam, Netherlands; Attendance: 1,600
18 September 2009		Boxscore		Amsterdam, Netherlands; Attendance: 1,600

18 September 2009	Venezuela	4–1	South Korea	Haarlem, Netherlands; Attendance: 334
18 September 2009		Boxscore		Haarlem, Netherlands; Attendance: 334

18 September 2009	Great Britain	0–6	Netherlands	Rotterdam, Netherlands; Attendance: 2,225
18 September 2009		Boxscore		Rotterdam, Netherlands; Attendance: 2,225

19 September 2009	Great Britain	3–10	Spain	Rotterdam, Netherlands; Attendance: 433
19 September 2009		Boxscore		Rotterdam, Netherlands; Attendance: 433

19 September 2009	South Korea	1–5	Cuba	Rotterdam, Netherlands; Attendance: 1,400
19 September 2009		Boxscore		Rotterdam, Netherlands; Attendance: 1,400

19 September 2009	Venezuela	3–5	Puerto Rico	Haarlem, Netherlands; Attendance: 1,116
19 September 2009		Boxscore		Haarlem, Netherlands; Attendance: 1,116

19 September 2009	Nicaragua	4–8	Netherlands	Amsterdam, Netherlands; Attendance: 3,000
19 September 2009		Boxscore		Amsterdam, Netherlands; Attendance: 3,000

20 September 2009	Nicaragua	0 – 16 (F/7)	Puerto Rico	Haarlem, Netherlands; Attendance: 406
20 September 2009		Boxscore		Haarlem, Netherlands; Attendance: 406

20 September 2009	Netherlands	3–5	Cuba	Rotterdam, Netherlands; Attendance: 4,000
20 September 2009		Boxscore		Rotterdam, Netherlands; Attendance: 4,000

20 September 2009	Venezuela	6–1	Great Britain	Haarlem, Netherlands; Attendance: 800
20 September 2009		Boxscore		Haarlem, Netherlands; Attendance: 800

20 September 2009	South Korea	2–1	Spain	Amsterdam, Netherlands; Attendance: 354
20 September 2009		Boxscore		Amsterdam, Netherlands; Attendance: 354

=== Group G ===
Qualified for the 3rd round

Team	W	L	R	RA	PCT	1st Tiebreaker Head–to–head record	2nd Tiebreaker Head–to–head runs allowed	3rd Tiebreaker Head–to–head record
United States	7	0	60	15	1.000	—	—	—
Australia	5	2	47	27	.714	1–1	8	1–0
Canada	5	2	50	29	.714	1–1	8	0–1
Chinese Taipei	5	2	32	29	.714	1–1	9	—
Japan	2	5	28	25	.286	1–1	9	—
Italy	2	5	32	54	.286	1–1	10	—
Mexico	2	5	28	38	.286	1–1	12	—
Netherlands Antilles	0	7	27	87	.000	—	—	—

13 September 2009	Australia	19 – 6 (F/7)	Netherlands Antilles	Piacenza, Italy; Attendance: 383
13 September 2009		Boxscore		Piacenza, Italy; Attendance: 383

13 September 2009	Italy	2–5	Chinese Taipei	Florence, Italy; Attendance: 1,800
13 September 2009		Boxscore		Florence, Italy; Attendance: 1,800

13 September 2009	Japan	9–3	Mexico	Parma, Italy; Attendance: 604
13 September 2009		Boxscore		Parma, Italy; Attendance: 604

13 September 2009	United States	8–0	Canada	Reggio Emilia, Italy; Attendance: 300
13 September 2009		Boxscore		Reggio Emilia, Italy; Attendance: 300

14 September 2009	Mexico	6–3	Italy	Bologna, Italy; Attendance: 500
14 September 2009		Boxscore		Bologna, Italy; Attendance: 500

14 September 2009	Canada	3 – 5 (F/10)	Australia	Novara, Italy; Attendance: 200
14 September 2009		Boxscore		Novara, Italy; Attendance: 200

14 September 2009	Netherlands Antilles	1 – 11 (F/7)	United States	Verona, Italy; Attendance: 850
14 September 2009		Boxscore		Verona, Italy; Attendance: 850

15 September 2009	Chinese Taipei	5 – 4 (F/10)	Australia	Godo, Italy; Attendance: 450
15 September 2009		Boxscore		Godo, Italy; Attendance: 450

15 September 2009	United States	4–2	Japan	Macerata, Italy; Attendance: 1,900
15 September 2009		Boxscore		Macerata, Italy; Attendance: 1,900

16 September 2009	Japan	1 – 3 (F/10)	Chinese Taipei	Serravalle, Republic of San Marino; Attendance: 120
16 September 2009		Boxscore		Serravalle, Republic of San Marino; Attendance: 120

16 September 2009	Mexico	2–4	Canada	Turin, Italy; Attendance: 400
16 September 2009		Boxscore		Turin, Italy; Attendance: 400

17 September 2009	Chinese Taipei	3 – 14 (F/7)	United States	Turin, Italy; Attendance: 1,000
17 September 2009		Boxscore		Turin, Italy; Attendance: 1,000

17 September 2009	Canada	3 – 2 (F/10)	Japan	Bologna, Italy; Attendance: 450
17 September 2009		Boxscore		Bologna, Italy; Attendance: 450

17 September 2009	Australia	5–4	Italy	Parma, Italy; Attendance: 1,522
17 September 2009		Boxscore		Parma, Italy; Attendance: 1,522

17 September 2009	Mexico	9–8	Netherlands Antilles	Serravalle, Republic of San Marino; Attendance: 300
17 September 2009		Boxscore		Serravalle, Republic of San Marino; Attendance: 300

18 September 2009	Netherlands Antilles	2 – 19 (F/6)	Canada	Godo, Italy; Attendance: 650
18 September 2009		Boxscore		Godo, Italy; Attendance: 650

18 September 2009	Italy	6–4	Japan	Novara, Italy; Attendance: 1,000
18 September 2009		Boxscore		Novara, Italy; Attendance: 1,000

18 September 2009	Chinese Taipei	1 – 0 (F/10)	Mexico	Verona, Italy; Attendance: 600
18 September 2009		Boxscore		Verona, Italy; Attendance: 600

19 September 2009	Japan	0–5	Australia	Bologna, Italy; Attendance: 400
19 September 2009		Boxscore		Bologna, Italy; Attendance: 400

19 September 2009	Netherlands Antilles	3–12	Chinese Taipei	Novara, Italy; Attendance: 350
19 September 2009		Boxscore		Novara, Italy; Attendance: 350

19 September 2009	Canada	16–7	Italy	Reggio Emilia, Italy; Attendance: 817
19 September 2009		Boxscore		Reggio Emilia, Italy; Attendance: 817

19 September 2009	Mexico	3–7	United States	Vicenza, Italy; Attendance: 500
19 September 2009		Boxscore		Vicenza, Italy; Attendance: 500

20 September 2009	Australia	6–5	Mexico	Macerata, Italy; Attendance: 1,300
20 September 2009		Boxscore		Macerata, Italy; Attendance: 1,300

20 September 2009	Canada	5 – 3 (F/6)	Chinese Taipei	Parma, Italy; Attendance: 323
20 September 2009		Boxscore		Parma, Italy; Attendance: 323

20 September 2009	Japan	10–1	Netherlands Antilles	Verona, Italy; Attendance: 550
20 September 2009		Boxscore		Verona, Italy; Attendance: 550

20 September 2009	Italy	3–12	United States	Turin, Italy; Attendance: 1,000
20 September 2009		Boxscore		Turin, Italy; Attendance: 1,000

21 September 2009	Italy	7–6	Netherlands Antilles	Vicenza, Italy; Attendance: 150
21 September 2009		Boxscore		Vicenza, Italy; Attendance: 150

21 September 2009	United States	4–3	Australia	Bologna, Italy; Attendance: 250
21 September 2009		Boxscore		Bologna, Italy; Attendance: 250

== Round 3 ==
=== Semi finals ===
Group 1

Team	W	L	R	RA	PCT
Cuba	5	2	35	15	.714
Puerto Rico	4	3	24	20	.571
Netherlands	3	4	36	38	.429
Venezuela	2	5	28	46	.289

Group 2

Team	W	L	R	RA	PCT
United States	7	0	48	14	1.000
Canada	4	3	32	28	.571
Australia	2	5	24	29	.289
Chinese Taipei	1	6	19	56	.143

22 September 2009	Cuba	2–1	Australia	Grosseto, Italy; Attendance: 300
22 September 2009		Boxscore		Grosseto, Italy; Attendance: 300

22 September 2009	Puerto Rico	0–3	Canada	Nettuno, Italy; Attendance: 500
22 September 2009		Boxscore		Nettuno, Italy; Attendance: 500

22 September 2009	United States	6–3	Venezuela	Florence, Italy; Attendance: 170
22 September 2009		Boxscore		Florence, Italy; Attendance: 170

22 September 2009	Netherlands	11–2	Chinese Taipei	Stadio Primo Nebiolo Messina, Italy; Attendance: 350
22 September 2009		Boxscore		Stadio Primo Nebiolo Messina, Italy; Attendance: 350

23 September 2009	Canada	9–2	Venezuela	Chieti, Italy; Attendance: 300
23 September 2009		Boxscore		Chieti, Italy; Attendance: 300

23 September 2009	Australia	5–2	Netherlands	Grosseto, Italy; Attendance: 250
23 September 2009		Boxscore		Grosseto, Italy; Attendance: 250

23 September 2009	Puerto Rico	0–3	United States	Florence, Italy; Attendance: 130
23 September 2009		Boxscore		Florence, Italy; Attendance: 130

23 September 2009	Chinese Taipei	0–8	Cuba	Nettuno, Italy; Attendance: 500
23 September 2009		Boxscore		Nettuno, Italy; Attendance: 500

24 September 2009	United States	5–3	Cuba	Nettuno, Italy; Attendance: 2,000
24 September 2009		Boxscore		Nettuno, Italy; Attendance: 2,000

24 September 2009	Chinese Taipei	2–8	Puerto Rico	Chieti, Italy; Attendance: 250
24 September 2009		Boxscore		Chieti, Italy; Attendance: 250

24 September 2009	Canada	11–5	Netherlands	Grosseto, Italy; Attendance: 250
24 September 2009		Boxscore		Grosseto, Italy; Attendance: 250

24 September 2009	Venezuela	9–4	Australia	Florence, Italy; Attendance: 104
24 September 2009		Boxscore		Florence, Italy; Attendance: 104

25 September 2009	Cuba	5–1	Canada	Florence, Italy; Attendance: 1,100
25 September 2009		Boxscore		Florence, Italy; Attendance: 1,100

25 September 2009	Venezuela	6–4	Chinese Taipei	Grosseto, Italy; Attendance: 200
25 September 2009		Boxscore		Grosseto, Italy; Attendance: 200

25 September 2009	Australia	2–4	Puerto Rico	Chieti, Italy; Attendance: 300
25 September 2009		Boxscore		Chieti, Italy; Attendance: 300

25 September 2009	Netherlands	2–8	United States	Nettuno, Italy; Attendance: 1,000
25 September 2009		Boxscore		Nettuno, Italy; Attendance: 1,000

=== Final round ===
==== 7th place game ====
26 September 2009	Venezuela	6–3	Chinese Taipei	Florence, Italy; Attendance: 110
26 September 2009		Boxscore		Florence, Italy; Attendance: 110

==== 5th place game ====
26 September 2009	Netherlands	1–4	Australia	Stadio Primo Nebiolo Messina, Italy; Attendance: 300
26 September 2009		Boxscore		Stadio Primo Nebiolo Messina, Italy; Attendance: 300

==== Bronze medal game ====
26 September 2009	Puerto Rico	2–6	Canada	Grosseto, Italy; Attendance: 1,000
26 September 2009		Boxscore		Grosseto, Italy; Attendance: 1,000

==== Final ====
27 September 2009	Cuba	5–10	United States	Stadio Steno Borghese, Nettuno, Italy; Attendance: 5,000
27 September 2009		Boxscore		Stadio Steno Borghese, Nettuno, Italy; Attendance: 5,000

== Final standings ==
Rk	Team	W	L	Tiebreakers	
1st place, gold medalist(s)	United States	14	1		
Lost in the Final
2nd place, silver medalist(s)	Cuba	12	3		
Failed to qualify for Final
3rd place, bronze medalist(s)	Canada	12	3		
4	Puerto Rico	10	5		
Failed to qualify for bronze medal game
5	Australia	9	6		
6	Netherlands	7	5		
Failed to qualify for 5th place game
7	Venezuela	9	6		
8	Chinese Taipei	6	9		
Failed to qualify for Round 3
Rk	Team	W	L	1st Tiebreaker	2nd Tiebreaker
9	South Korea	4	6	3–4	–
10	Japan	4	6	2–5	25 RA
11	Mexico	5	5	2–5	38 RA
12	Spain	3	7	2–5	47 RA
13	Nicaragua	5	5	2–5	48 RA
14	Italy	2	5	2–5	54 RA
15	Great Britain	1	9	0–7	50 RA
16	Netherlands Antilles	2	8	0–7	87 RA
Failed to qualify for Round 2
Rk	Team	W	L	Tiebreaker	
17	Germany	1	2	–	
18	Croatia	0	3	27 RA	
19	Sweden	0	3	34 RA	
20	Czech Republic	0	3	36 RA	
21	South Africa	0	3	37 RA	
22	China	0	3	39 RA	

2009 Baseball World Cup champions

United States
4th title

== Awards ==
The IBAF announced the following awards at the completion of the tournament.

All Star Team
Position	Player
Best Starting Pitcher	(Cuba) Norge Luis Vera
Best Relief Pitcher	(Canada) Trystan Magnuson
Catcher	(Netherlands) Sidney de Jong
First Base	(United States) Justin Smoak
Second Base	(Cuba) Héctor Olivera
Third Base	(Canada) Shawn Bowman
Short Stop	(Netherlands) Hainley Statia
Outfield	(Cuba) Alfredo Despaigne
Outfield	(Cuba) José Dariel Abreu
Outfield	(United States) Jon Weber
Designated Hitter	(United States) Terry Tiffee

Tournament Awards
Award	Player
MVP	(United States) Justin Smoak
Leading Batter	(Spain) Paco Figueroa
Best Earned Run Average (Pitcher)	(Canada) Matt Kniginyzky
Best Won/Loss Average (Pitcher)	(United States) Todd Redmond
Most Runs Batted In	(Venezuela) René Reyes
Most Home Runs	(Cuba) Alfredo Despaigne
Most Stolen Bases	(Spain) Paco Figueroa
Most Runs Scored	(Canada) Rene Tosoni
Outstanding Defensive Player	(Puerto Rico) Ángel Sánchez
