= Baseball & Softball Club Godo =

Italian baseball team

De Angelis Godo Baseball is a professional baseball team that has played in the Italian Baseball League, formerly known as Serie A1, since 2006. In 2010, the team was renamed the De Angelis North East Knights.

== Sources ==
- Baseball Reference – Italian Baseball League Encyclopedia and History
