= Alex MacKay (umpire) =

American baseball umpire (born 1989)

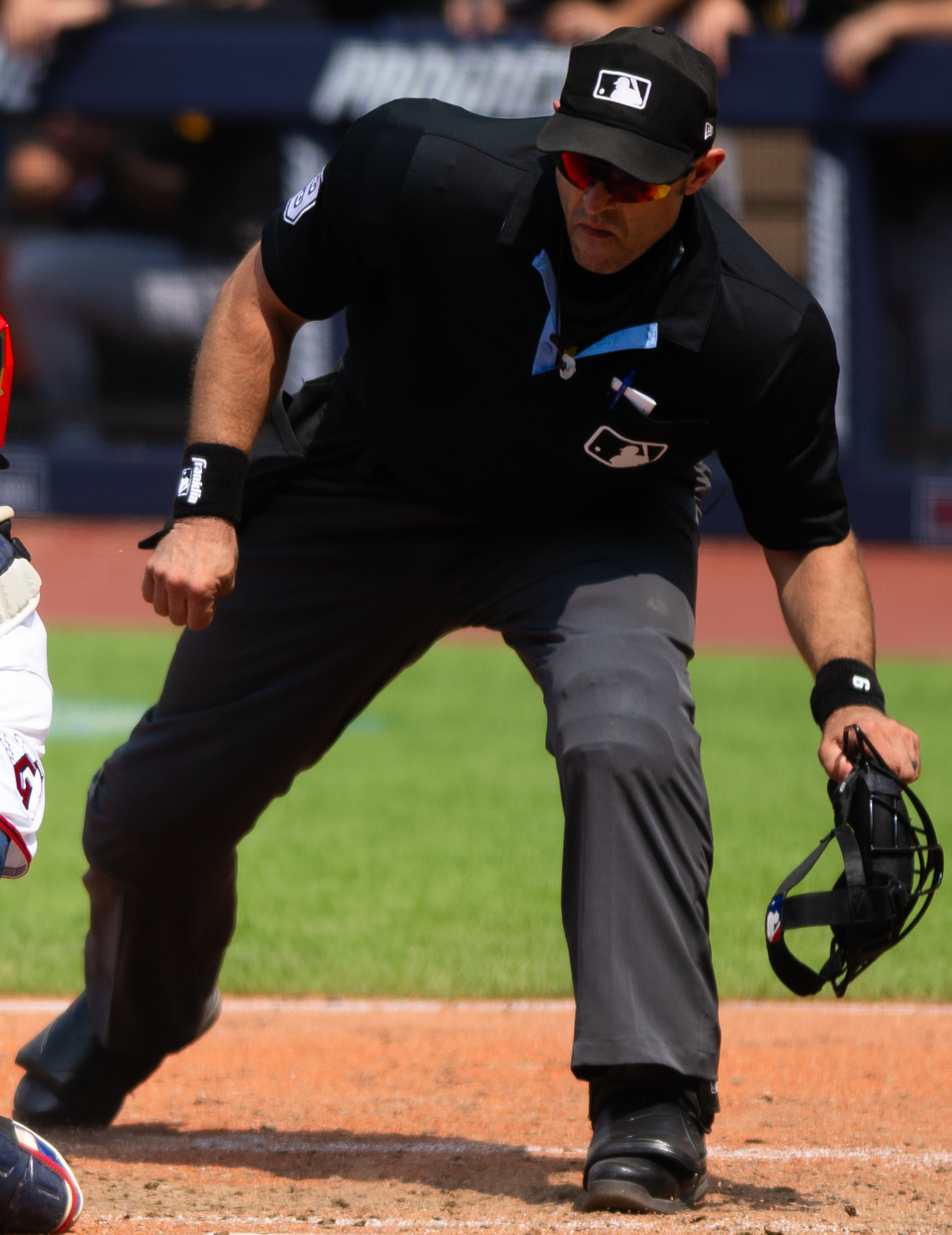
- MacKay during a game at Progressive Field in 2026

MLB – No. 9
- Umpire
- Born: February 3, 1989 (age 37); Denver, Colorado, U.S.

MLB debut
- August 21, 2020

Crew information
- Umpiring crew: D
- Crew members: #64 Alan Porter (crew chief); #28 Jim Wolf; #40 Roberto Ortiz; #9 Alex MacKay

Career highlights and awards
- Special assignments: Wild Card Games/Series (2026)

Alex Charles MacKay (born February 3, 1989) is an American professional umpire in Major League Baseball. He wears uniform number 9.

== Career ==
MacKay began working as a Minor League Baseball umpire in 2012 after graduating from the MiLB Umpire Academy. He umpired in the Florida Instructional League, Pioneer League, Florida State League, Southern League and Pacific Coast League.

MacKay made his major league debut on August 21, 2020, for a game between the Kansas City Royals and Minnesota Twins at Kauffman Stadium. Wearing uniform number 105, he was at second base, with Ed Hickox at first, fellow call-up umpire Jeremie Rehak as the home plate umpire, and Jerry Meals at third.

MLB promoted MacKay to the permanent staff prior to the 2025 season along with Paul Clemons and Emil Jiménez, upon the retirements of Paul Emmel, Jerry Layne, and Larry Vanover.

== See also ==
- List of Major League Baseball umpires (disambiguation)
