= Paul Clemons =

American baseball umpire (born 1986)

MLB – No. 57
- Umpire
- Born: 1986 (age 39–40); Topeka, Kansas, U.S.

MLB debut
- August 19, 2020

Crew information
- Umpiring crew: L
- Crew members: #80 Adrian Johnson (crew chief); #81 Quinn Wolcott; #18 Ramon De Jesus; #57 Paul Clemons

Career highlights and awards
- Special assignments: Wild Card Games/Series (2026)

Paul Clemons (born 1986) is an American umpire in Major League Baseball. He wears uniform number 57.

== Career ==
Clemons began working as a Minor League Baseball umpire in 2011. He umpired in the Arizona League, Northwest League, California League, Eastern League, International League, Pacific Coast League and Arizona Fall League.

Clemons made his major league debut on August 19, 2020, for the first game of a doubleheader between the Kansas City Royals and Cincinnati Reds at Kauffman Stadium. Wearing uniform number 104, he was at first base, with John Tumpane as the home plate umpire, Jeff Nelson at third, and C.B. Bucknor at second.

MLB promoted Clemons to the permanent staff prior to the 2025 season along with Alex MacKay and Emil Jiménez, upon the retirements of Paul Emmel, Jerry Layne, and Larry Vanover.

Clemons was home plate umpire for the Houston Astros combined no-hitter against the Texas Rangers at Globe Life Field on May 25, 2026.

== Personal life ==
Clemons's brother, Charlie, is a former Minor League umpire and collegiate umpire. Clemons's father, Duane, is also a collegiate umpire, and has umpired NCAA games alongside Charlie.

== See also ==
- List of Major League Baseball umpires (disambiguation)
