= Emil Jiménez =

Venezuelan baseball umpire (born 1986)

MLB – No. 82
- Umpire
- Born: 1986 (age 39–40); Santa Ana de Coro, Falcon, Venezuela

MLB debut
- April 18, 2023

Crew information
- Umpiring crew: B
- Crew members: #88 Doug Eddings (crew chief); #76 Mike Muchlinski; #47 Gabe Morales; #82 Emil Jímenez

Career highlights and awards
- Special assignments: Wild Card Games/Series (2026)

Emil Jiménez Pernalete (born 1986) is a Venezuelan professional umpire in Major League Baseball. He wears uniform number 82.

== Career ==
Jiménez began working as a Minor League Baseball umpire in 2015. He umpired in the Gulf Coast League, New York-Penn League, South Atlantic League, Florida State League, Southern League, Eastern League, Pacific Coast League, International League and Arizona Fall League. He also umpired in the Venezuelan Professional Baseball League from 2013 to 2023.

Jiménez made his major league debut on April 18, 2023, for a game between the Philadelphia Phillies and the Chicago White Sox at Guaranteed Rate Field. He was at first base, with C.B. Bucknor as the home plate umpire, Jeff Nelson at third, and Ben May at second.

MLB promoted Jiménez to the permanent staff prior to the 2025 season along with Paul Clemons and Alex MacKay, upon the retirements of Paul Emmel, Jerry Layne, and Larry Vanover.

=== Notable games ===
As a call-up umpire in 2024, Jiménez was involved in minor controversy, where he ejected Lane Thomas of the Washington Nationals, who had never been ejected from a game prior, for arguing a called third strike despite Thomas appearing to not say much to get ejected, only turning around to look at Jiménez.

Jiménez would again make headlines in 2025, in a game between the San Diego Padres and New York Mets at Petco Park. During the game, Jiménez called the New York Mets right fielder Juan Soto out on strikes in the third and seventh inning. Soto, having to be held back by his teammate Pete Alonso, caused his manager, Carlos Mendoza to come out of the dugout to defend Soto, resulting in Jiménez ejecting Mendoza from the game.

== Personal life ==
Jiménez's younger brother, Edwin, is currently a Minor League Umpire who is on Major League Baseball's call-up list in the event a full-time Major League umpire is not available. Jiménez and his wife Maria have two kids, Emiliano and Emiliana.

== See also ==
- List of Major League Baseball umpires (disambiguation)
