= 2026 American League Wild Card Series =

Teams
Team (Wins)		Manager	Season
Chicago White Sox (2)		Will Venable	84–78 (.519), GB: 1
Houston Astros (0)		Joe Espada	81–81 (.500), GA: 1
- Dates: September 29–30
- Television: NBCSN
- TV announcers: Tom McCarthy, Steve Stone, Geoff Blum, Adam Ottavino, and Britney Eurton
- Radio: ESPN
- Radio announcers: Roxy Bernstein and Gregg Olson
- Umpires: Ryan Additon, Paul Clemons, Alex MacKay, Edwin Moscoso, Alan Porter (crew chief), Alex Tosi

Teams
Team (Wins)		Manager	Season
New York Yankees (2)		Aaron Boone	93–68 (.578), GB: 4 1/2
Boston Red Sox (0)		Chad Tracy	87–75 (.537), GB: 11
- Dates: September 29–30
- Television: NBC
- TV announcers: Jason Benetti, Joe Girardi, Lou Merloni, Anthony Rizzo, and Caroline Pineda
- Radio: ESPN
- Radio announcers: Michael Kay, Eduardo Perez, and Tim Kurkjian
- Umpires: Scott Barry, Emil Jiménez, John Libka, Nate Tomlinson, John Tumpane, Mark Wegner (crew chief)

The 2026 American League Wild Card Series were the two best-of-three playoff series in Major League Baseball’s (MLB) 2026 postseason to determine the participating teams of the 2026 American League Division Series (ALDS). Both Wild Card Series began on September 29, with Game 2s scheduled for September 30. NBC broadcast both Wild Card Series in the United States together with ESPN Radio.

These matchups were:

- (3) Houston Astros (AL West champions) vs. (6) Chicago White Sox (third wild card): White Sox won the series, 2–0.
- (4) New York Yankees (first wild card) vs. (5) Boston Red Sox (second wild card): Yankees won the series, 2–0.

== Background ==
The lowest-seeded division winner and three wild card teams in each league play in a best-of-three series after the end of the regular season. The winners of each league's wild card rounds advance to face the two best division winners in that league's Division Series.

The Houston Astros (81–81) clinched their tenth postseason berth in the last twelve seasons (2015, 2017–2024, 2026) along with the American League West division title for the eighth time in the last ten years (2017–2019, 2021–2024, 2026) on September 27 following the Texas Rangers' loss to the Minnesota Twins. They were the fourth MLB team to qualify for the playoffs without a winning record, following the 1981 Kansas City Royals, 2020 Milwaukee Brewers, and 2020 Houston Astros, the first to do so twice, and the first team and division winner to qualify for the playoffs without a winning record, locking into the third seed in the process. They hosted the sixth seed Chicago White Sox (84–78), who clinched the postseason berth for the first time since 2021 and the third postseason berth in seven years (2020–2021, 2026) on September 24 and later locked into sixth seed after Cleveland Guardians defeated Kansas City Royals and they lost to the Colorado Rockies. The matchup marked the third postseason meeting between the Astros and the White Sox; their previous meetings was the 2005 World Series when the Astros were members of the National League and the 2021 ALDS, with the White Sox sweeping in the former and the Astros winning in the latter. Houston won the regular season series over Chicago, 5–2.

The New York Yankees (93–68) clinched their tenth postseason berth in the last twelve seasons (2015, 2017–2022, 2024–2026) following a 8–3 win over the Minnesota Twins coupled with the Toronto Blue Jays’ 6–5 loss to the Detroit Tigers on September 14. They were locked in the fourth seed as the winningest non-division winner when the Tampa Bay Rays won the American League East during the second game of doubleheader after clinching home-field the previous game. They hosted the fifth seed Boston Red Sox (87–75), who clinched their second consecutive postseason berth on September 20, with a Atlanta Braves win over the Houston Astros. The Red Sox were the first team to make the postseason after being 14-plus games out of a playoff spot as late as June 24 since the 1914 "Miracle" Boston Braves. This is a rematch of last year's Wild Card Series between the two teams, which the Yankees won in three games, and the seventh official postseason match-up between the two historic rivals. New York won the season series over Boston, 7–6, although Boston's four-game sweep of New York from June 25–28 kickstarted a 32–5 stretch, including the team's first 15-game winning streak since 1946. The Yankees were without star outfield Aaron Judge, who injured his calf a week before the end of the season, and missed 96 games from late May to September due to a fractured rib.

The Tampa Bay Rays (98–64) and Cleveland Guardians (85–77) earned a bye into the American League Division Series due to their status as the best division winners in the American League. This was a particularly down season for the AL, as just two teams won 90-games and only five teams total had a record over .500.

== Matchups ==
=== Houston Astros vs. Chicago White Sox ===
Chicago won the series, 2–0.

Game	Date	Score	Location	Time	Attendance
1	September 29	Chicago White Sox – 6, Houston Astros – 3	Daikin Park	3:13	34,011
2	September 30	Chicago White Sox – 7, Houston Astros – 3	Daikin Park	3:05	36,015

=== New York Yankees vs. Boston Red Sox ===
New York won the series, 2–0.

Game	Date	Score	Location	Time	Attendance
1	September 29	Boston Red Sox – 0, New York Yankees – 9	Yankee Stadium	3:01	48,437
2	September 30	Boston Red Sox – 2, New York Yankees – 9	Yankee Stadium	2:59	49,004

== Houston vs. Chicago ==
This was the third postseason meeting between the Houston Astros and the Chicago White Sox. The White Sox won the 2005 World Series (during which the Astros were a part of the National League), while the Astros won the latest match-up in the 2021 ALDS.

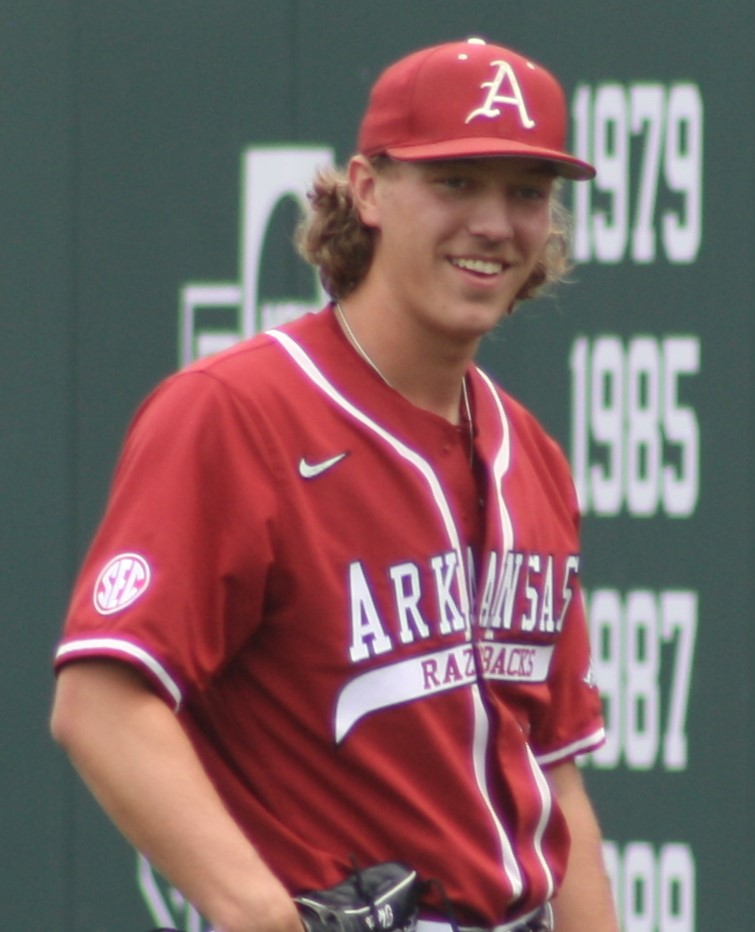
Hagen Smith pitched three scoreless innings to start the game for the White Sox.

=== Game 1 ===
September 29, 2026 4:10 pm (CDT) at Daikin Park in Houston, Texas 72 °F (22 °C), Roof Closed
Team	1	2	3	4	5	6	7	8	9	R	H	E
Chicago	1	2	0	1	1	0	1	0	0	6	11	1
Houston	0	0	0	0	2	0	0	1	0	3	6	1
WP: Jordan Hicks (1–0) LP: AJ Blubaugh (0–1); Home runs: CWS: Colson Montgomery (1); HOU: Nelson Velázquez (1); Attendance: 34,011; Boxscore

Prior to the game, Pope Leo XIV, an avid White Sox fan, sent a supportive letter and blessed the team before their first playoff game since 2021.

In the top of the first inning, Munetaka Murakami's sacrifice fly scored Sam Antonacci to give the White Sox an early 1–0 lead. Astros starting pitcher AJ Blubaugh recorded only two outs, walking three batters and allowing one run (zero earned runs) before being replaced by Bryan King. In the top of the second, an Antonacci single drove in Braden Montgomery and Chase Meidroth to extend the lead to 3–0. King retired just one batter, surrendering four hits and two runs. Miguel Ullola then entered in relief with no outs and the bases loaded, escaping the jam with back-to-back strikeouts. Ullola pitched three innings, allowing one hit and one run while striking out four.

In the top of the fourth, Colson Montgomery hit a solo home run to make it 4–0. Meanwhile, White Sox pitcher Hagen Smith tossed three scoreless innings, giving up two hits and striking out one. Murakami scored on a Meidroth infield single in the fifth, pushing the lead to 5–0. In the bottom of the frame, Nelson Velázquez hit a pinch-hit two-run home run off Sean Newcomb to cut the deficit to 5–2.

After a wild pitch by Bennett Sousa brought home Murakami in the seventh to make it 6–2, the Astros clawed back another run in the eighth. Jose Altuve reached on a throwing error by Miguel Vargas, allowing Jeremy Peña to score; a subsequent challenge by the White Sox upheld the safe call on the field, bringing the score to 6–3. Grant Taylor pitched the final 2 1/3 innings for Chicago, allowing a run and striking out five. Relief pitcher Jordan Hicks earned the win, securing the White Sox's first postseason road victory since Game 1 of the 2020 Wild Card Series against the Oakland Athletics.

=== Game 2 ===
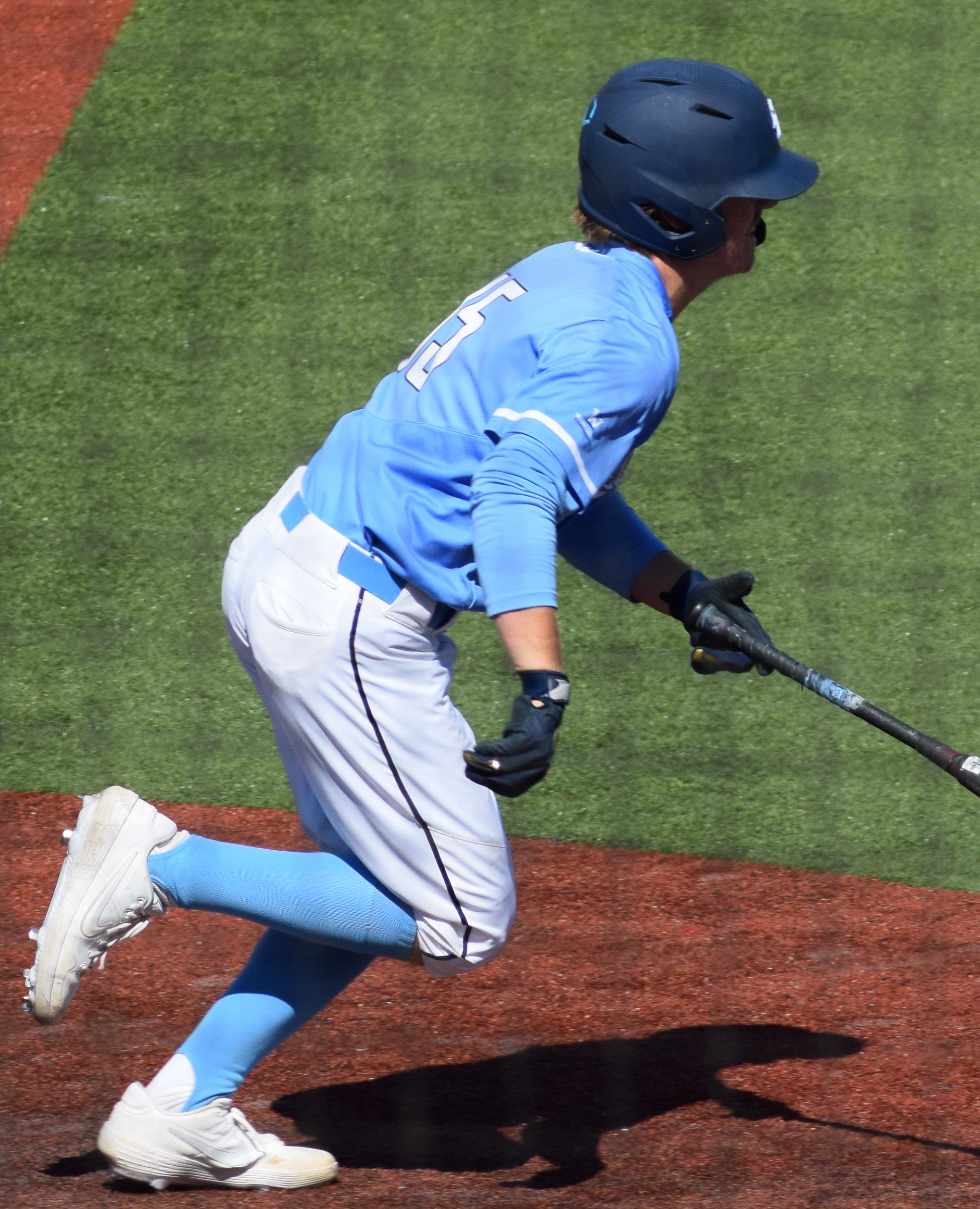
Chase Meidroth's three-run home helped seal the series win for the White Sox and send them to the ALDS.

September 30, 2026 4:11 pm (CDT) at Daikin Park in Houston, Texas 73 °F (23 °C), Roof Closed
Team	1	2	3	4	5	6	7	8	9	R	H	E
Chicago	4	0	0	0	0	3	0	0	0	7	8	0
Houston	1	1	0	1	0	0	0	0	0	3	5	2
WP: Anthony Kay (1–0) LP: Hunter Brown (0–1); Home runs: CWS: Chase Meidroth (1); HOU: Jeremy Peña (1), Cam Smith (1), Jose Altuve (1); Attendance: 36,015; Boxscore

Sam Antonacci led off the game with a double for the White Sox and later scored when Kyle Teel singled to right field. Teel and Miguel Vargas both scored on an RBI single by Andrew Benintendi, giving the White Sox a 3–0 lead. The White Sox extended their lead to 4–0 when Benintendi scored on an RBI single by Tristan Peters. The White Sox batted through their entire order in the top of the first inning.

Hunter Brown did not make it out of the first inning, pitching only 2/3 of an inning while giving up five hits and four runs (three earned) and striking out two batters. Jeremy Peña cut the Astros' deficit to 4–1 with a solo home run in the bottom of the first inning. The Astros added another run in the bottom of the second inning on a solo home run by Cam Smith, cutting the deficit to 4–2. Jose Altuve hit the Astros' third solo home run of the game, and 28th in his postseason career, in the bottom of the fourth inning, cutting the lead down to 4–3.

Sean Burke pitched four innings, giving up four hits and three runs, while striking out eight batters for the White Sox. In the top of the sixth inning, Chase Meidroth hit a three-run home run off Bryan Abreu, extending the White Sox's lead to 7–3.

Anthony Kay pitched 2/3 of an inning giving up no runs or hits and earned the victory for the White Sox. Erick Fedde pitched the final two innings giving up no hits or runs to help seal the victory. The White Sox won the series 2–0 to claim their first playoff series win since the 2005 World Series, which also came against the Astros. They will advance to face their division rivals the Cleveland Guardians in the ALDS. This loss gave the Astros their ninth consecutive home postseason loss, dating back to Game 2 of the 2023 ALDS.

=== Composite line score ===
2026 ALWC (2–0): Chicago White Sox beat Houston Astros

Team	1	2	3	4	5	6	7	8	9	R	H	E
Chicago White Sox	5	2	0	1	1	3	1	0	0	13	19	1
Houston Astros	1	1	0	1	2	0	0	1	0	6	11	3
Total attendance: 70,026 Average attendance: 35,013

== New York vs. Boston ==
This is the seventh postseason meeting between the Boston Red Sox and the New York Yankees, as well as their third meeting in the Wild Card round. In their most recent matchup at the 2025 American League Wild Card Series, the Yankees prevailed in three games.

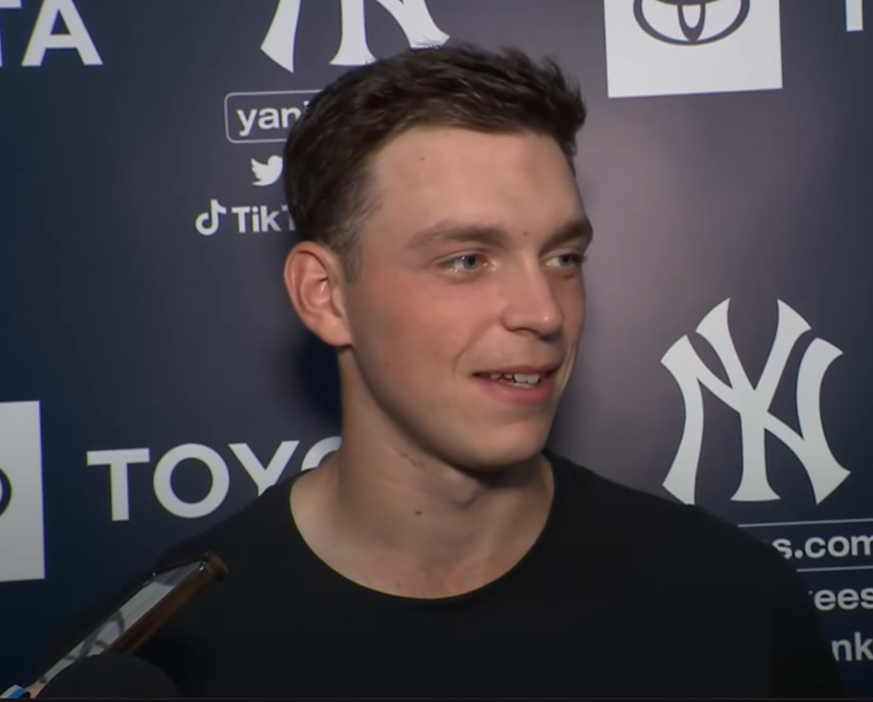
Ben Rice hit a solo and grand slam home run in Game 1.

=== Game 1 ===
September 29, 2026 8:15 pm (EDT) at Yankee Stadium in The Bronx, New York 69 °F (21 °C), Cloudy
Team	1	2	3	4	5	6	7	8	9	R	H	E
Boston	0	0	0	0	0	0	0	0	0	0	3	0
New York	0	1	0	0	1	0	2	5	X	9	12	0
WP: Cam Schlittler (1–0) LP: Payton Tolle (0–1); Home runs: BOS: None; NYY: Ben Rice 2 (2); Attendance: 48,437; Boxscore

In the bottom of the second inning, Austin Wells hit an RBI single, scoring George Lombard Jr. to give the Yankees a 1–0 lead. Payton Tolle pitched 4 2/3 innings, giving up five hits and one run while striking out four batters. In the bottom of the fifth, Ben Rice hit a solo home run to extend the advantage to 2–0. Meanwhile, Cam Schlittler put together a dominant performance against the Red Sox, pitching 6 1/3 scoreless innings, allowing just two hits and striking out ten batters over a career-high 117 pitches. In two starts in both Wild Card Series against the Red Sox, he has allowed no runs and struck out 22 batters over 14 1/3 innings pitched.

The Yankees added two more runs in the bottom of the seventh; Rice drove in Spencer Jones with a single, and Wells scored on a double play grounded into by Luis García Jr., pushing the lead to 4–0. In the eighth inning, New York blew the game open with five runs, highlighted by a sacrifice fly from Wells and a grand slam by Rice—his second home run of the game. The 9–0 victory gave the Yankees a 1–0 lead in the series and marked the highest-scoring shutout in Wild Card history. Rice finished the game with six RBIs, tying the record for the most in a single postseason game in franchise history.

=== Game 2 ===
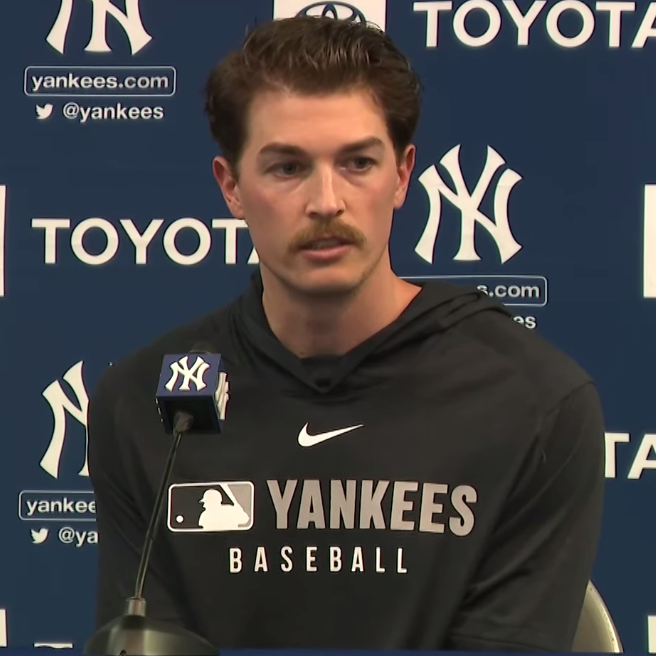
Max Fried won the second game against their rival Boston Red Sox to advance to the ALDS.

September 30, 2026 8:15 pm (EDT) at Yankee Stadium in The Bronx, New York 68 °F (20 °C), Cloudy
Team	1	2	3	4	5	6	7	8	9	R	H	E
Boston	0	0	0	0	0	1	1	0	0	2	4	1
New York	0	0	0	1	1	6	1	0	X	9	14	0
WP: Max Fried (1–0) LP: Sonny Gray (0–1); Home runs: BOS: Willson Contreras (1), Nick Sogard (1); NYY: Luis Garcia Jr. (1), Cody Bellinger (1); Attendance: 49,004; Boxscore

In the bottom of the fourth inning, Luis Garcia Jr. staked the Yankees to an early 1–0 lead with a solo home run. They added to it in the fifth when Cody Bellinger drove home Austin Wells with an RBI single, making it 2–0. Meanwhile, Red Sox starter Sonny Gray went 4 2/3 innings—surrendering two runs on six hits with five strikeouts—before giving way to Erik Miller with two outs in the fifth, echoing a similar early hook from the previous day. Boston finally broke through in the sixth when Willson Contreras launched a solo shot, cutting the deficit to 2–1 and snapping a 26 2/3 inning postseason scoreless drought for the club. Outside of that blemish, Yankees starter Max Fried was brilliant, limiting the Red Sox to just one run and three hits while striking out six over six strong frames.

The game unraveled completely for Boston in the bottom of the sixth as Garrett Crochet made his long-awaited return to the mound for his first appearance since April. The disaster began when Spencer Jones reached first safely on an uncaught third strike by Adley Rutschman. Following a catching error on a stolen base attempt, George Lombard Jr. came through with an RBI single to score Jones and stretch New York's lead to 3–1.

With still no outs recorded, Crochet was chased in favor of Garrett Whitlock, but the parade of runs continued. Austin Wells lifted a sacrifice fly to bring home Lombard, and Ryan McMahon followed with a groundout that plated Jazz Chisholm Jr.. After Ben Rice was intentionally walked, Bellinger crushed a three-run homer, capping a explosive six-run frame as the Yankees batted around.

Though Nick Sogard got one back for Boston with a solo home run in the top of the seventh, Wells answered in the bottom half with another RBI single to score Chisholm and push the advantage to 9–2. Closing out the sweep, the Yankees punched their ticket to the ALDS to face the Tampa Bay Rays, punctuated by a staggering 18–2 run differential—the largest ever recorded across a two-game postseason span.

=== Composite line score ===
2026 ALWC (2–0): New York Yankees beat Boston Red Sox

Team	1	2	3	4	5	6	7	8	9	R	H	E
Boston Red Sox	0	0	0	0	0	1	1	0	0	2	7	1
New York Yankees	0	1	0	1	2	6	3	5	0	18	26	0
Total attendance: 97,441 Average attendance: 48,721

== See also ==
- 2026 National League Wild Card Series
