= Brian O'Nora =

American baseball umpire (born 1963)

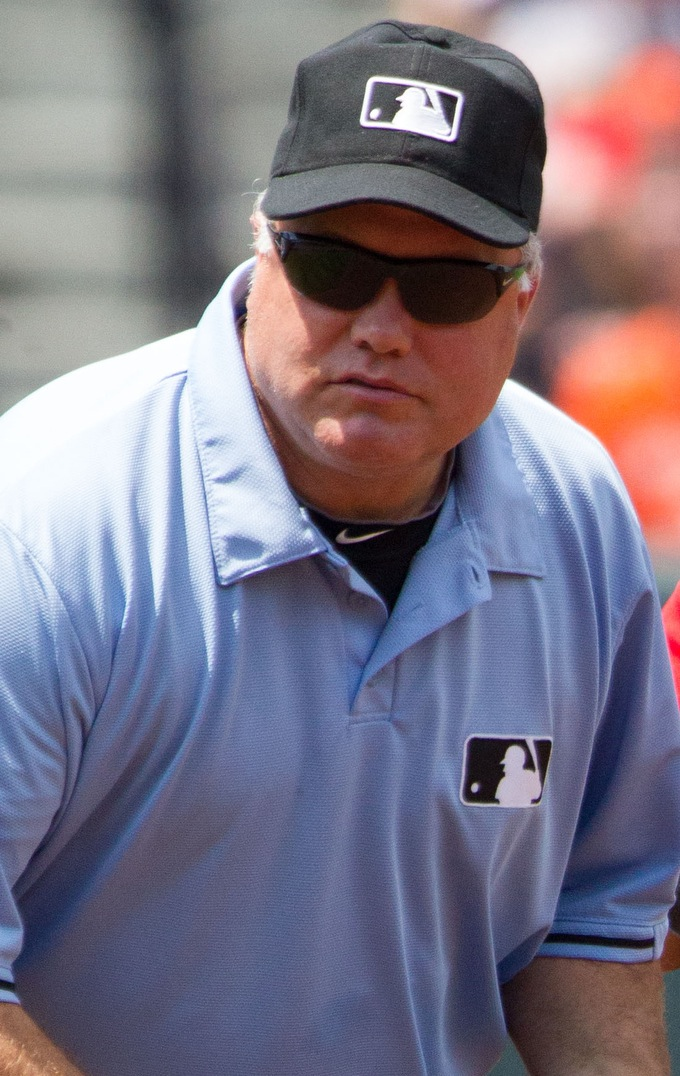
- O'Nora in 2012
- Umpire
- Born: February 7, 1963 (age 63); Youngstown, Ohio, U.S.

MLB debut
- August 4, 1992

Last appearance
- July 26, 2026

Career highlights and awards
- Special Assignments: All-Star Game (2000, 2010, 2019); Division Series (2004, 2006, 2009, 2010, 2012, 2017, 2023); League Championship Series (2008); World Series (2012)

Brian Keith O'Nora (born February 7, 1963) is an American Former umpire in Major League Baseball (MLB). He joined the major league staff in 2000, after previously umpiring for the American League (AL) from 1992 to 1999 (wearing sleeve number 41 during his AL tenure) and wore sleeve number 7.

== Umpiring career ==
O'Nora previously worked the Appalachian League (1985), the Midwest League (1986–1987), the Eastern League (1988–1989), the Pacific Coast League (1990), the American Association (1991), the International League, the Florida Instructional League (1985–1989) and the Puerto Rican Winter League (1990–1992).

Since joining the Major League umpiring staff in 2000, O'Nora has worked the 2004 National League Division Series, the 2006 National League Division Series, the 2009 National League Division Series, the 2010 American League Division Series, and the 2012 National League Division Series. He also umpired the 2008 American League Championship Series and the 2012 World Series. He was a part of the crew that worked in the 2000, 2010, and 2019 Major League Baseball All-Star Games.

On July 5, 2026, USA Today's Bob Nightengale reported that O'Nora was one of seven umpires who had accepted a buyout from Major League Baseball to retire after the 2026 season.

=== Injuries ===
On June 24, 2008, during a game between the Colorado Rockies and the Kansas City Royals, O'Nora was accidentally struck in the head by a fragment from Miguel Olivo's broken bat. O'Nora sustained a mild concussion and a laceration on his forehead, and he was hospitalized until the next day.

In April 2013, O'Nora suffered an intestinal tear and had to leave a game between the New York Mets and the Philadelphia Phillies. On September 1, 2013, O'Nora departed during another game, this time involving the Rockies and the Cincinnati Reds, because he was experiencing illness.

On September 7, 2018, O'Nora was struck in the mask by a foul ball while working the plate as the Boston Red Sox hosted the Houston Astros; he finished the half-inning and then left the game.

On June 15, 2019, O'Nora was struck in the groin by a foul ball while behind the plate during a game between the New York Mets and the St. Louis Cardinals. O'Nora remained in the game for a few more pitches and then left through the Mets dugout due to continued discomfort.

On May 16, 2026, O’Nora was struck by a foul ball while working as the plate umpire during a game between the Chicago Cubs and the Chicago White Sox. O’Nora would then proceed to leave the game in the 4th inning.

=== Notable games ===
On September 25, 2003, O'Nora was the plate umpire for Carlos Delgado's four-homer game.

In 2011, O'Nora was one of two MLB umpires (the other being Scott Barry) who were selected to officiate the MLB-All Stars Taiwan series; Barry and O'Nora were joined by two Taiwanese umpires for the games.

O'Nora was the home plate umpire in a game between the Yankees and Red Sox on August 18, 2013. Alex Rodriguez appeared in his first at bat of the game against Ryan Dempster with Rodriguez getting booed Red Sox fans when he came up to bat. Dempster threw his first pitch behind Rodriguez before eventually hitting him on a 3-0 count which appeared to be intentional. O'Nora warned both teams but allowed Dempster to stay in the game which caused Yankees manager Joe Girardi to become irate at O'Nora arguing that Dempster should be ejected before Girardi was thrown out of the game. Yankees would win the game 9-6.

During Spring training in 2014, O'Nora served as the replay umpire for the first use of expanded replay in a Major League Baseball game. After Toronto Blue Jays manager John Gibbons elected to challenge a safe call made by first base umpire Fieldin Culbreth, O'Nora upheld the ruling following a video review that lasted 2 minutes and 34 seconds.

O’Nora was behind home plate for the Chicago Cubs combined no hitter against the Los Angeles Dodgers on June 24, 2021.

== Personal life ==
O'Nora is married and has three children.

In December 2020, he was arrested and charged with solicitation and possessing criminal tools in connection with a human trafficking sting in Liberty Township, Ohio.

== See also ==
- List of Major League Baseball umpires (disambiguation)
