= Scott Barry =

American baseball umpire (born 1976)

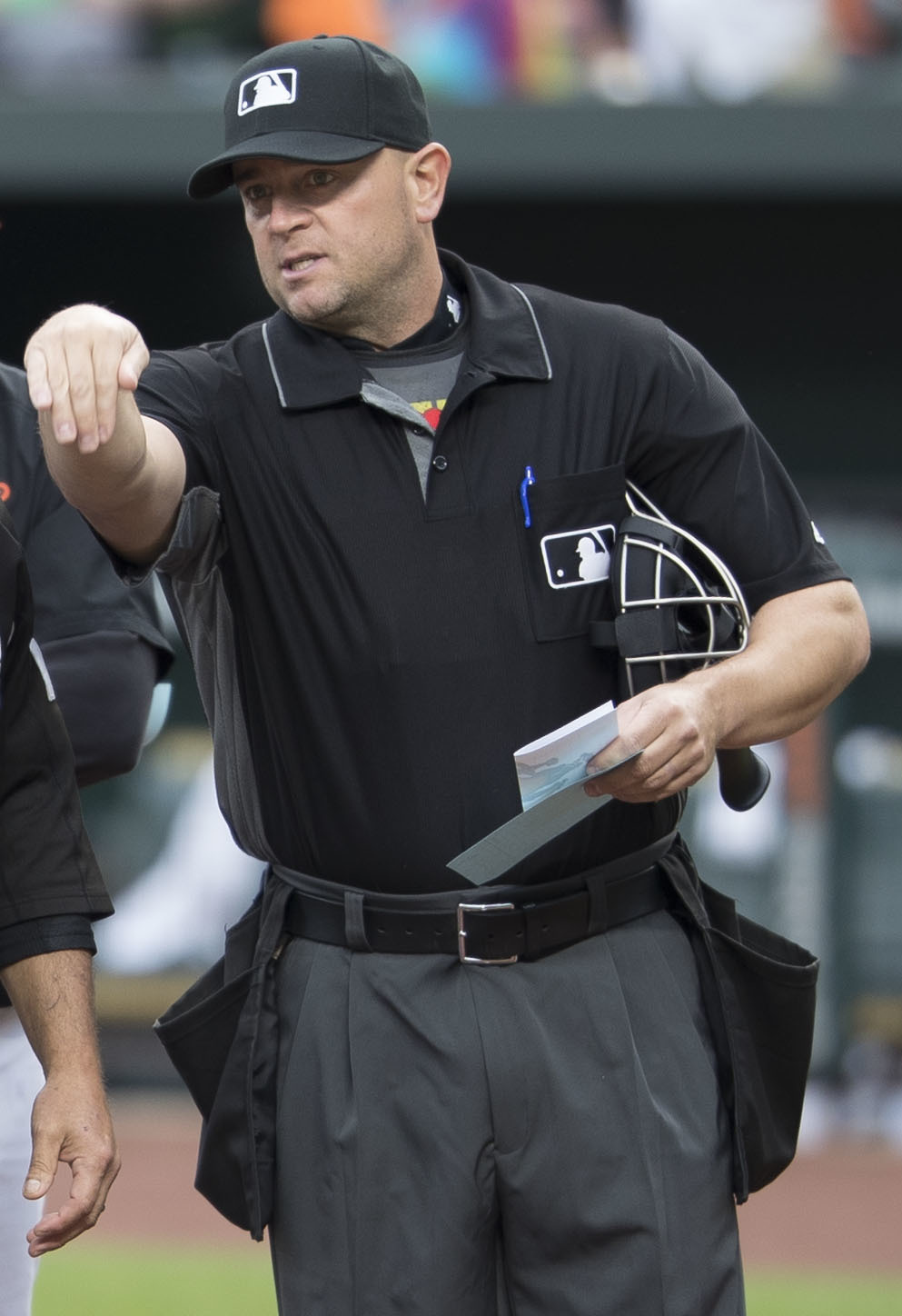
- Barry in 2017

MLB – No. 87
- Umpire
- Born: August 3, 1976 (age 50); Battle Creek, Michigan, U.S.

MLB debut
- June 4, 2006

Crew information
- Umpiring crew: C
- Crew members: #46 Ron Kulpa (crew chief); #87 Scott Barry; #79 Manny Gonzalez; #69 Tom Hanahan

Career highlights and awards
- Special assignments: League Championship Series (2018); Division Series (2012, 2014, 2022); Wild Card Games/Series (2025, 2026); All-Star Games (2014); World Baseball Classic (2006)

Scott Adam Barry (August 3, 1976) is an American umpire in Major League Baseball (MLB). Scott made his debut as an MLB reserve umpire in 2006, and 2011 was his first full-time season as an MLB umpire.

== Early career ==
Barry officiated in the 2006 World Baseball Classic, which used mostly minor league umpires. In 2007, Barry was the replacement umpire for Mike Winters after the latter was suspended for his part in an altercation with then-San Diego Padres outfielder Milton Bradley. Winters had allegedly profanely insulted Bradley prior to the altercation in which Bradley tore his ACL. In 2011, Barry was one of two MLB umpires (the other being Brian O'Nora) who were selected to officiate in the Taiwan All-Star Series; Barry and O'Nora were joined by two Taiwanese umpires for the games.

In August 2010, during a game between the Atlanta Braves and the Washington Nationals, Barry ejected Nationals third baseman Ryan Zimmerman for tossing his bat after a strikeout. Zimmerman later claimed that he was frustrated for striking out, but that "Barry believed the bat and helmet tossing... was directed at the umpire". It was the second consecutive night with a Nationals ejection by Barry, as he had tossed 14-time All-Star catcher Iván Rodríguez on August 18 for disputing a check-swing strike call. A few days later he ejected Philadelphia Phillies first baseman Ryan Howard in a 16-inning game against the Houston Astros for throwing his bat toward the dugout. Both Zimmerman and Howard had never been ejected from a major league game prior to this. After this rough stretch of games, Barry, who was a minor league replacement umpire at the time, was not penalized by Major League Baseball but was instead promoted to a full-time major league umpire for the start of the 2011 season.

Barry umpired in the 2014 MLB All-Star Game as well as the American League Division Series in 2012 and 2014. He wears uniform number 87.

== Personal life ==
Barry lives in Quincy, Michigan. He was married for 25 years, until his wife’s death from colon cancer in 2023. He has two sons.

== See also ==
- List of Major League Baseball umpires (disambiguation)
