= Quinn Wolcott =

American baseball umpire (born 1986)

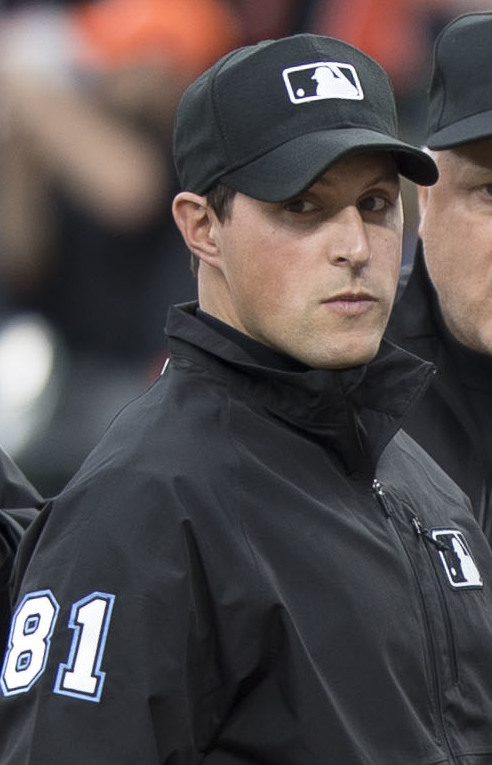
- Wolcott in 2017

MLB – No. 81
- Umpire
- Born: June 17, 1986 (age 40); Puyallup, Washington, U.S.

MLB debut
- May 27, 2013

Crew information
- Umpiring crew: L
- Crew members: #80 Adrian Johnson (crew chief); #81 Quinn Wolcott; #18 Ramon De Jesus; #57 Paul Clemons

Career highlights and awards
- Special Assignments: World Series (2023); League Championship Series (2022, 2025); Division Series (2017, 2020, 2021, 2023, 2026); Wild Card Games/Series (2016, 2020, 2022, 2025); All-Star Games (2023); World Baseball Classic (2023)

Quinn Wolcott (born June 17, 1986) is an American umpire in Major League Baseball. He wears number 81.

Before the Major Leagues, Wolcott worked in the Northwest (2006), Midwest (2007), Carolina (2007–2008), Southern (2009–2010), and Pacific Coast Leagues (2011–2012).

== Early years ==
At Emerald Ridge High School in Puyallup, Washington, Wolcott played baseball and officiated local high school football games. He also played euphonium for the concert band, winning a regional solo contest for his performance. After graduating from Emerald Ridge in 2005, Wolcott initially enrolled in Pierce College, but decided to attend umpiring school instead.

== Career ==
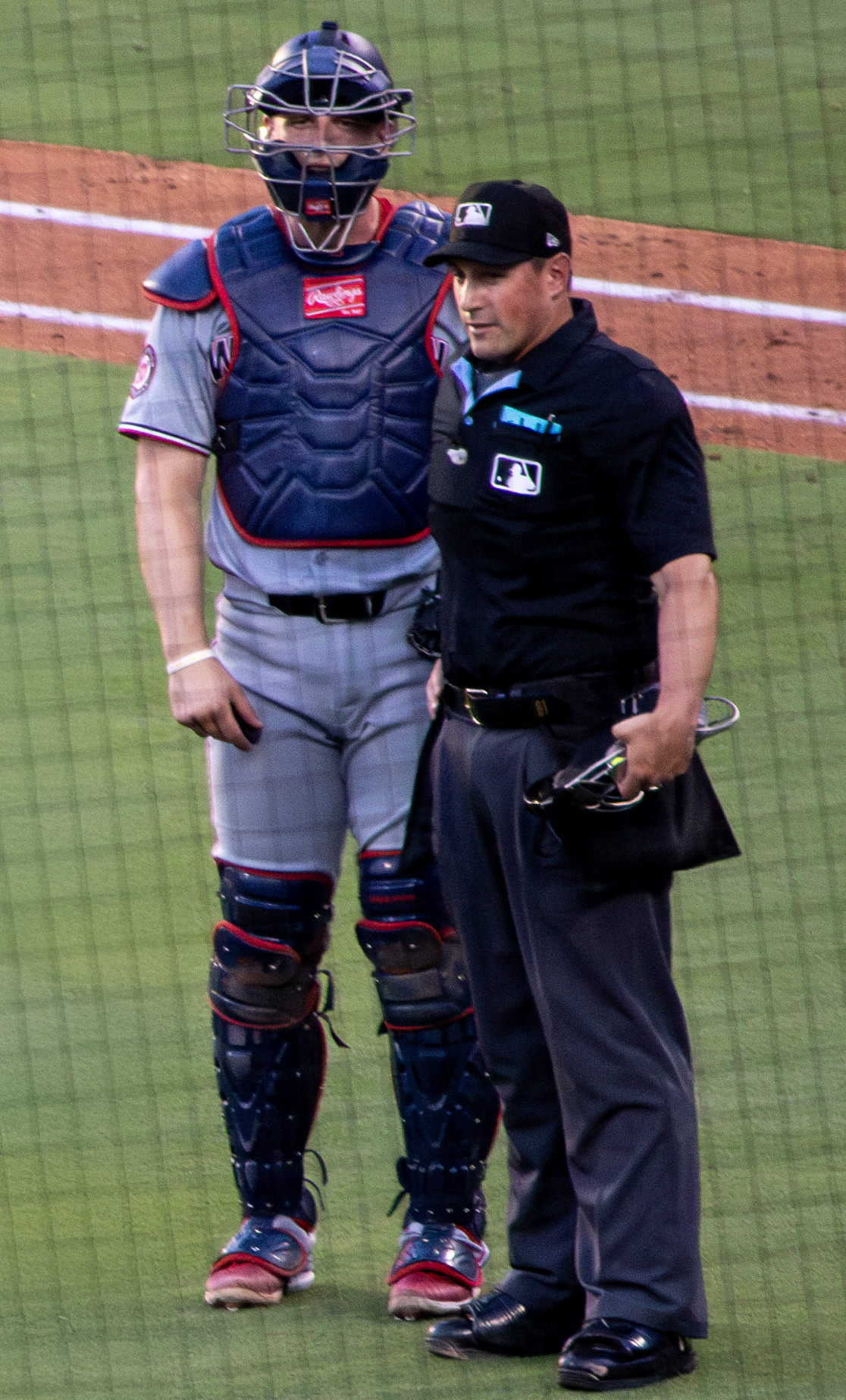
Wolcott alongside Nationals catcher Riley Adams, 2025.

Wolcott attended the Jim Evans Academy for Professional Umpiring in 2006, and at the age of 19 subsequently was the youngest umpire hired to the minor leagues that year. He made his Major League debut on May 27, 2013, working both games of a doubleheader between the Arizona Diamondbacks and Texas Rangers.

Wolcott was hired to the full-time Major League umpire roster on July 4, 2014, to replace Gary Darling, who had retired. At the age of 28, Wolcott was the youngest Major League umpire on the roster.

Wolcott's first postseason assignment was the 2016 National League Wild Card Game between the San Francisco Giants and New York Mets.

On September 13, 2017, Wolcott initiated a minor controversy by hinting that Detroit Tigers pitcher Buck Farmer and catcher John Hicks might have conspired to hit him intentionally after a controversial call that got then manager Brad Ausmus ejected. However, MLB found no solid evidence to back up that claim.

== See also ==
- List of Major League Baseball umpires (disambiguation)
