= Manny Gonzalez (umpire) =

Venezuelan baseball umpire (born 1979)

Manny González
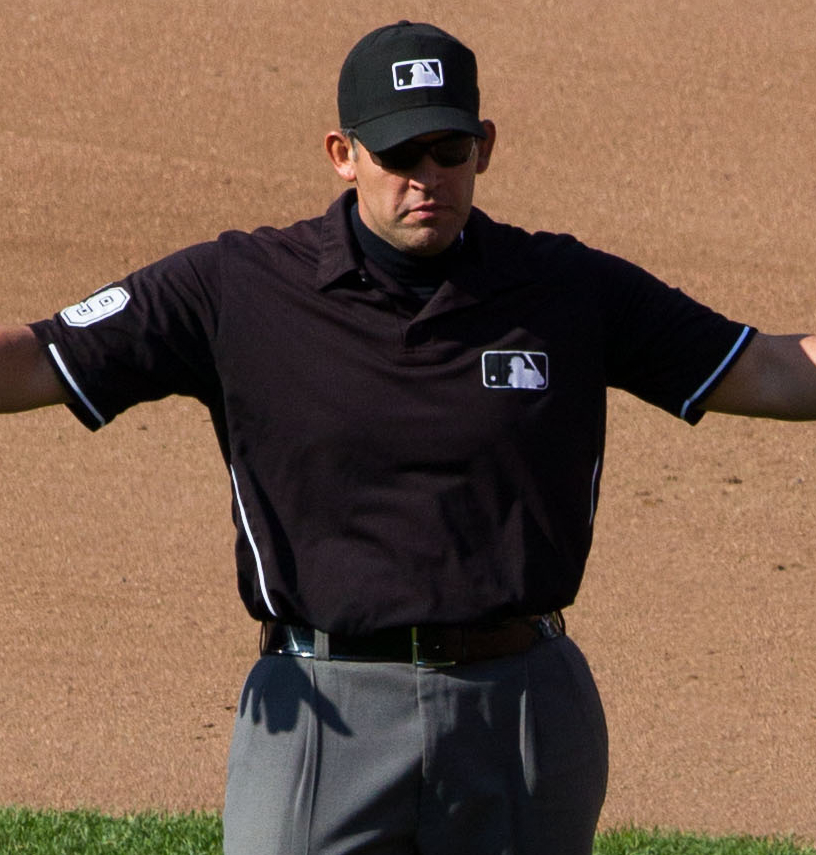
- Gonzalez in 2012

MLB – No. 79
- Umpire
- Born: December 4, 1979 (age 46); Caracas, Venezuela

MLB debut
- May 17, 2010

Crew information
- Umpiring crew: C
- Crew members: #46 Ron Kulpa (crew chief); #87 Scott Barry; #79 Manny Gonzalez; #69 Tom Hanahan

Career highlights and awards
- Special assignments: League Championship Series (2020); Division Series (2019); Wild Card Games/Series (2015, 2020); All-Star Games (2017); MLB Little League Classic (2024); World Baseball Classic (2026)

Manuel Augusto González (born December 4, 1979) is a Venezuelan umpire in Major League Baseball (MLB). He made his major-league umpiring debut on May 17, 2010, filling in for John Hirschbeck, becoming the first Venezuelan umpire in MLB history.

== Career ==
González umpired 11 MLB games in 2010, and returned to umpire 42 MLB games in 2011 before being hired to the full-time MLB staff in early 2013. He issued his first career ejection on June 26, 2012, when Ike Davis was tossed for arguing a safe call at first base in Chicago.

González was the second base umpire for the no-hitter by Alec Mills of the Chicago Cubs against the Milwaukee Brewers on September 13, 2020.

González was forced to leave a game at Fenway Park on September 6, 2021, after being hit in the mask by a foul ball while umpiring behind the plate.

On June 29, 2026 shortly after the 2026 Venezuela earthquakes, Manny, a native Venezuelan, wore a short sleeve hoodie featuring the Venezuelan flag with baseball stitching pre-game.

== See also ==
- List of Major League Baseball umpires (disambiguation)
