= Ramon De Jesus =

Dominican baseball umpire (born 1983)

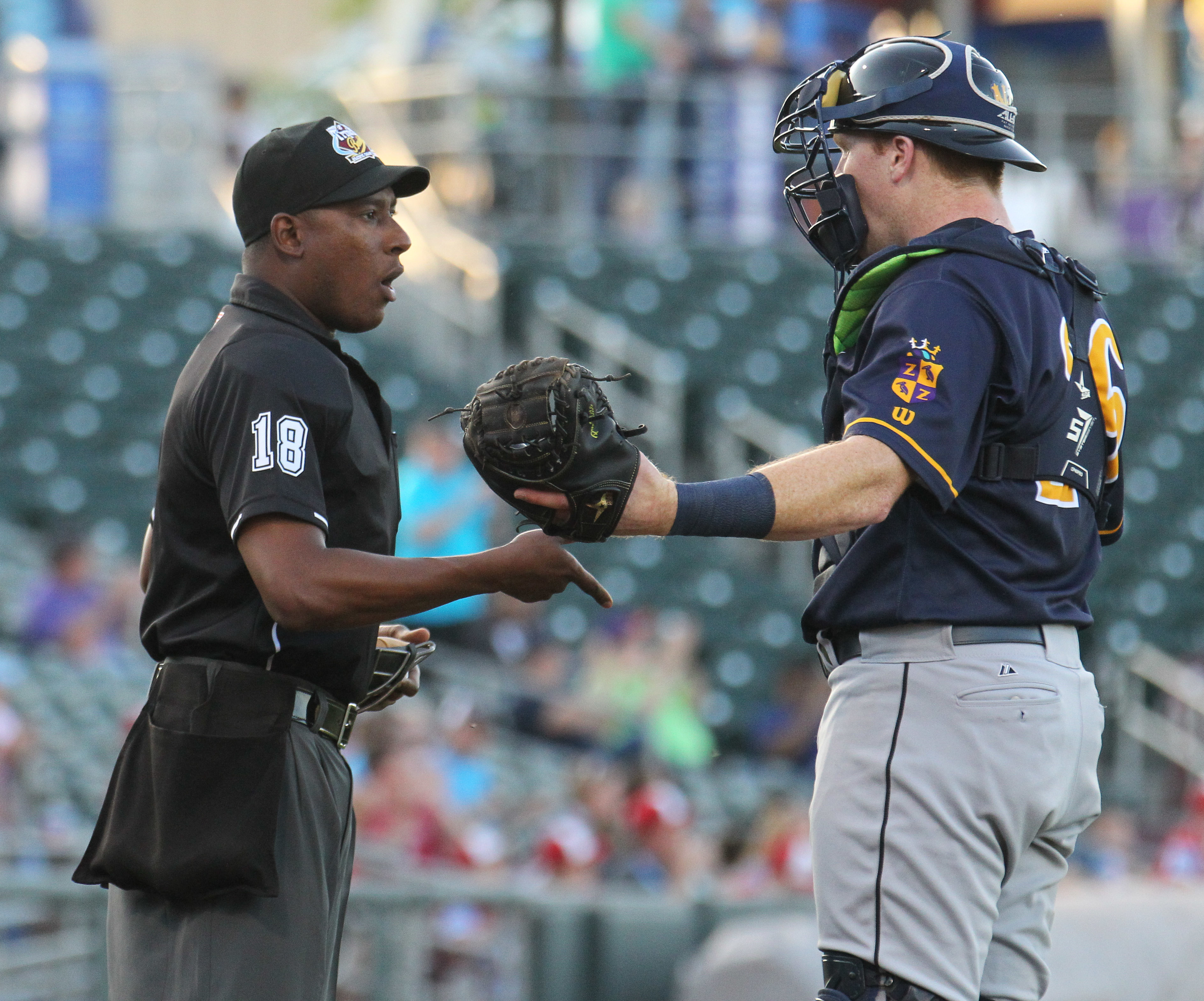
- De Jesus (left) with catcher Chad Wallach during a minor-league game in 2018

MLB – No. 18
- Umpire
- Born: August 31, 1983 (age 43); Santo Domingo, Dominican Republic

MLB debut
- April 22, 2016

Crew information
- Umpiring crew: L
- Crew members: #80 Adrian Johnson (crew chief); #81 Quinn Wolcott; #18 Ramon De Jesus; #57 Paul Clemons

Career highlights and awards
- Wild Card Games (2021, 2026); Division Series (2023, 2024); World Baseball Classic (2023); All-Star Game (2023)

Ramon Silvestre De Jesus Ferrer (born August 31, 1983) is a Dominican professional baseball umpire. He made his Major League Baseball (MLB) debut on April 22, 2016, thus becoming the first MLB umpire from the Dominican Republic. De Jesus wears number 18, which was most previously worn by former umpire Marcus Pattillo.

During the 2016 season, De Jesus umpired 97 big league games (25 as the home plate umpire), and issued one ejection. The ejection was to Miami Marlins coach Tim Wallach. During the 2017 season, De Jesus issued several ejections, including Los Angeles Dodgers second baseman Chase Utley, following a disagreement over De Jesus' positioning on the field. De Jesus was the first base umpire for the inaugural MLB Little League Classic, on August 20, 2017, in Williamsport, Pennsylvania. Ramon De Jesus worked as one of the replay officials for the 2022 AL and NL division series.

In the 2023 MLB season, De Jesus was selected to work right field in the All-Star Game at T-Mobile Park in Seattle.

On July 25, 2024, De Jesus was the home plate umpire for the game between the San Diego Padres and Washington Nationals where Dylan Cease threw a no-hitter.
