= Umpire (baseball) =

Person charged with officiating a baseball game

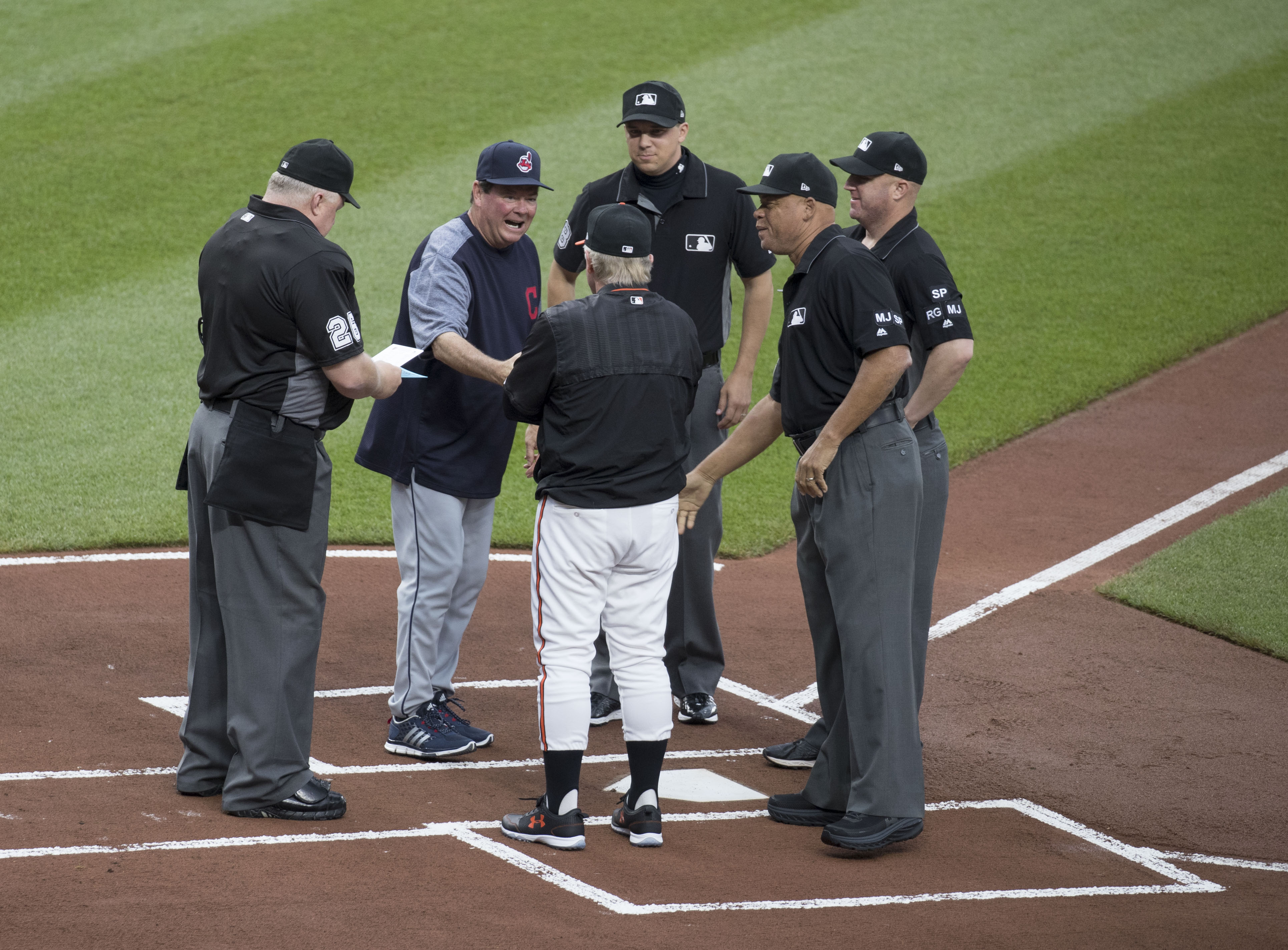
An MLB umpiring crew meeting with the managers from each team before a 2017 game

In baseball, the umpire is the person charged with officiating the game, including beginning and ending the game, enforcing the rules of the game and the grounds, making judgment calls on plays, and handling disciplinary actions. The term is often shortened to the colloquial form ump. They are also sometimes nicknamed blue due to the traditional color of the uniform worn by umpires. Although games were often officiated by a sole umpire in the formative years of the sport, since the turn of the 20th century, officiating has been commonly divided among several umpires, who form the umpiring crew. The position is analogous to that of a referee in many other sports.

== Role and responsibilities ==
Umpires enforce all rules of play, make real-time judgment calls, manage disputes between players and coaches, and may issue ejections if necessary. The role requires strong observation, communication, and decision-making skills.

== Duties and positions ==
An umpire in Japan calling a strike, 2024

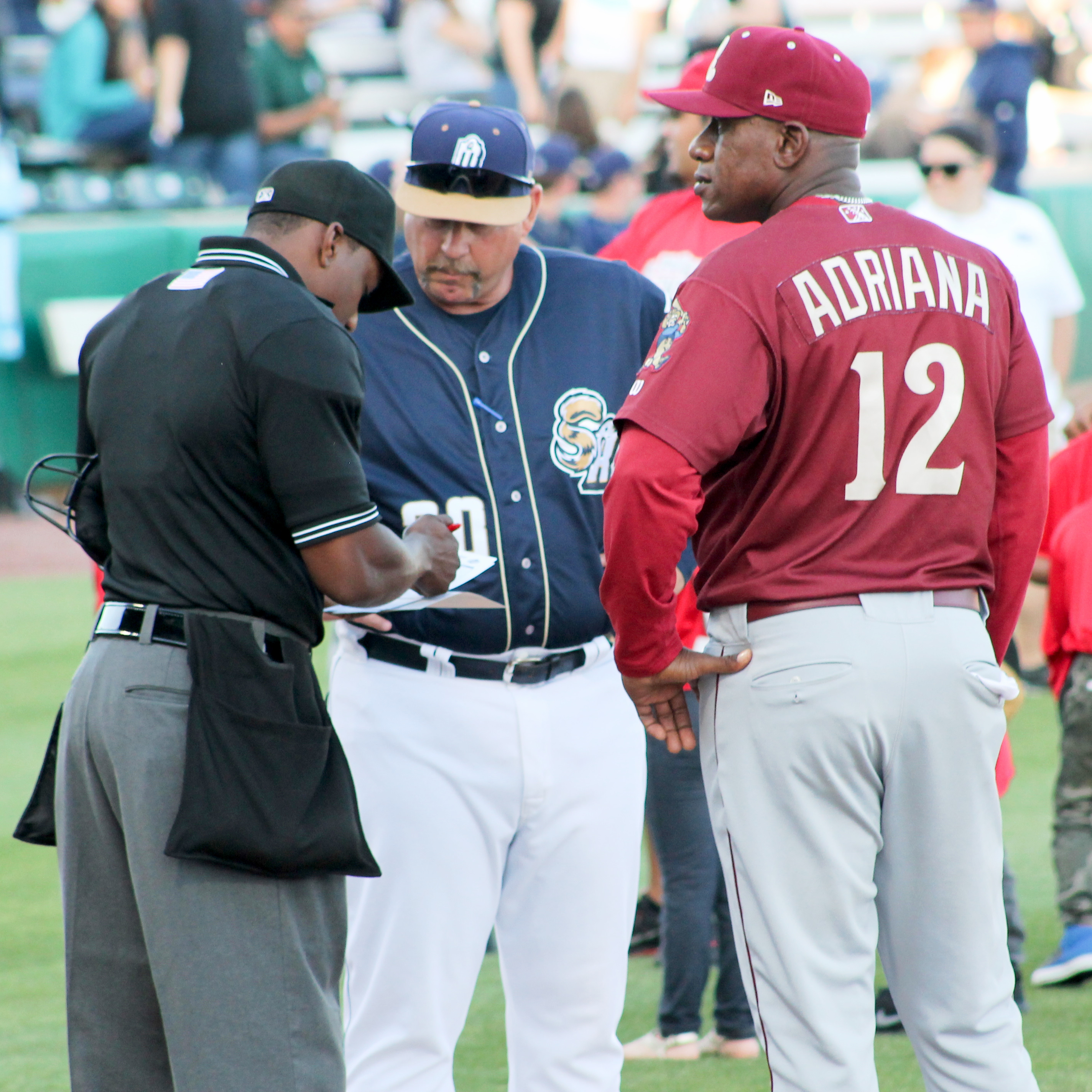
Home plate umpire Malachi Moore reviews the lineup cards from both teams before a 2016 minor league baseball game

The umpire-in-chief, usually called the home plate umpire, is stationed behind home plate and calls balls and strikes, calls fair balls, foul balls short of first/third base, and makes most calls concerning the batter or concerning baserunners near home plate. To avoid injury, the home plate umpire wears similar equipment to the catcher, including mask, chest protector, leg guards and shoes with extra protection added over the laces. If another umpire leaves the infield to cover a potential play in foul ground or in the outfield, then the plate umpire may move to cover a potential play near second or third base. In the event that an umpire is injured and only three remain, the second base position will generally be left vacant.

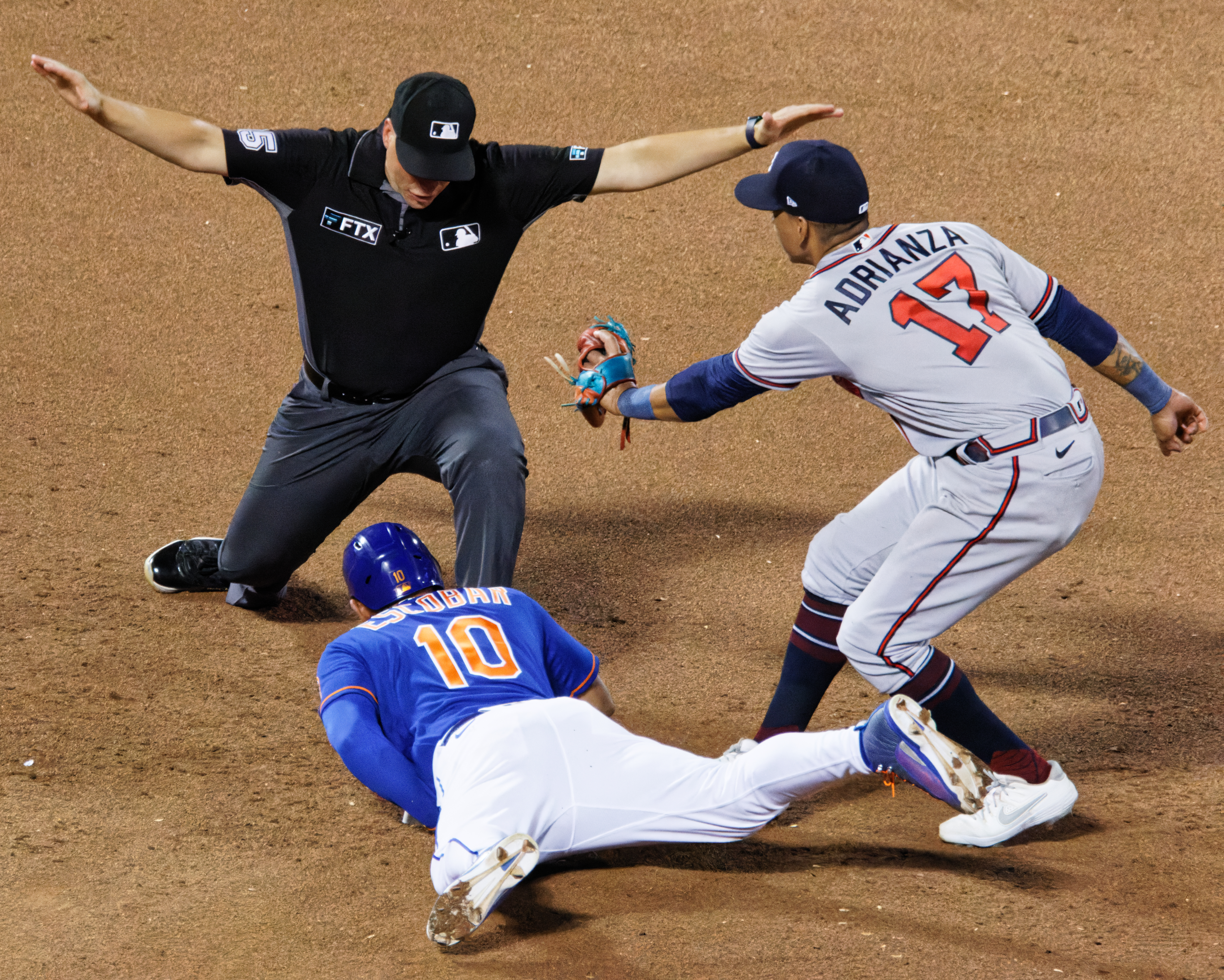
Base umpire Stu Scheurwater calls Eduardo Escobar safe.

Other umpires, called field umpires, are commonly stationed near the bases. When two umpires are used in a game, the second umpire will make most calls concerning runners on the bases and nearby plays, as well as in the middle of the outfield. When three umpires are used, the two field umpires are stationed at first and third bases umpire, though they may move to different positions on the field as the play demands. These two umpires also call checked swings if asked by the home plate umpire, the first-base umpire for right-handed batters, and the third-base umpire for left-handed batters. When four umpires are used (as is the case for all regular season MLB games), each umpire will be stationed at a specific base.

Sometimes a league will provide six umpires; the extra two are stationed along the outfield foul lines in left and right field. Outfield umpires are used in major events, such as the Major League Baseball All-Star Game, and depending on the level, at parts of post-season playoffs. For Major League Baseball, all playoff levels use six umpires adding a left-field and right-field umpire, while at lower levels, six umpires are used at the championship games (such as NCAA). Rulings on catches of batted balls are usually made by the umpire closest to the play.

In nearly all levels of organized baseball, including the majors, an umpiring crew rotates so that each umpire in the crew works each position, including plate umpire, an equal number of games. In the earliest days of baseball, however, many senior umpires always worked the plate, with Hall of Fame umpire Bill Klem being the last umpire to do so. Klem did so for the first 16 years of his career. On the Major League level, an umpiring crew generally rotates positions clockwise each game, with an exception for doubleheaders, where the plate umpires scheduled for both games do not work the other game at first or third base. In a doubleheader, the first base umpire in the regular rotation is replaced by a fifth umpire in the first game (the regularly scheduled umpire will be the plate umpire in the second game), and the fifth umpire takes third base in the second game, to replace the umpire who was the plate umpire in the first game.

=== Crew chief ===
The crew chief is usually the most experienced umpire in a crew. At the major-league and high minor-league (Class AAA and AA) levels, the crew chief acts as a liaison between the league office and the crew and has a supervisory role over other members of the crew.

For example, on the Major League level, "The Crew Chief shall coordinate and direct his crew's compliance with the Office of the Commissioner's rules and policies. Other Crew Chief responsibilities include: leading periodic discussions and reviews of situations, plays and rules with his crew; generally directing the work of the other umpires on the crew, with particular emphasis on uniformity in dealing with unique situations; assigning responsibilities for maintaining time limits during the game; ensuring the timely filing of all required crew reports for incidents such as ejections, brawls and protested games; and reporting to the Office of Commissioner any irregularity in field conditions at any ballpark." Thus, on the professional level, some of the duties assigned to the umpire-in-chief (the plate umpire) in the Official Baseball Rules have been reassigned to the crew chief, regardless of the crew chief's umpiring position during a specific game. Instant replay reviews, for example, will be reviewed with the crew chief and one other umpire (usually the umpire who made the call on the field, unless the call was made by the crew chief), with results announced by the crew chief. The crew chief acts analogous to the crew chief in basketball (as referenced in the NBA and FIBA rules) or the referee in American football.

Starting with the 2022 season, umpire crew chiefs are equipped with wireless microphones to be used when announcing replay challenges and the results of those challenges, similar to college and professional football and the National Hockey League.

== Judgment calls ==
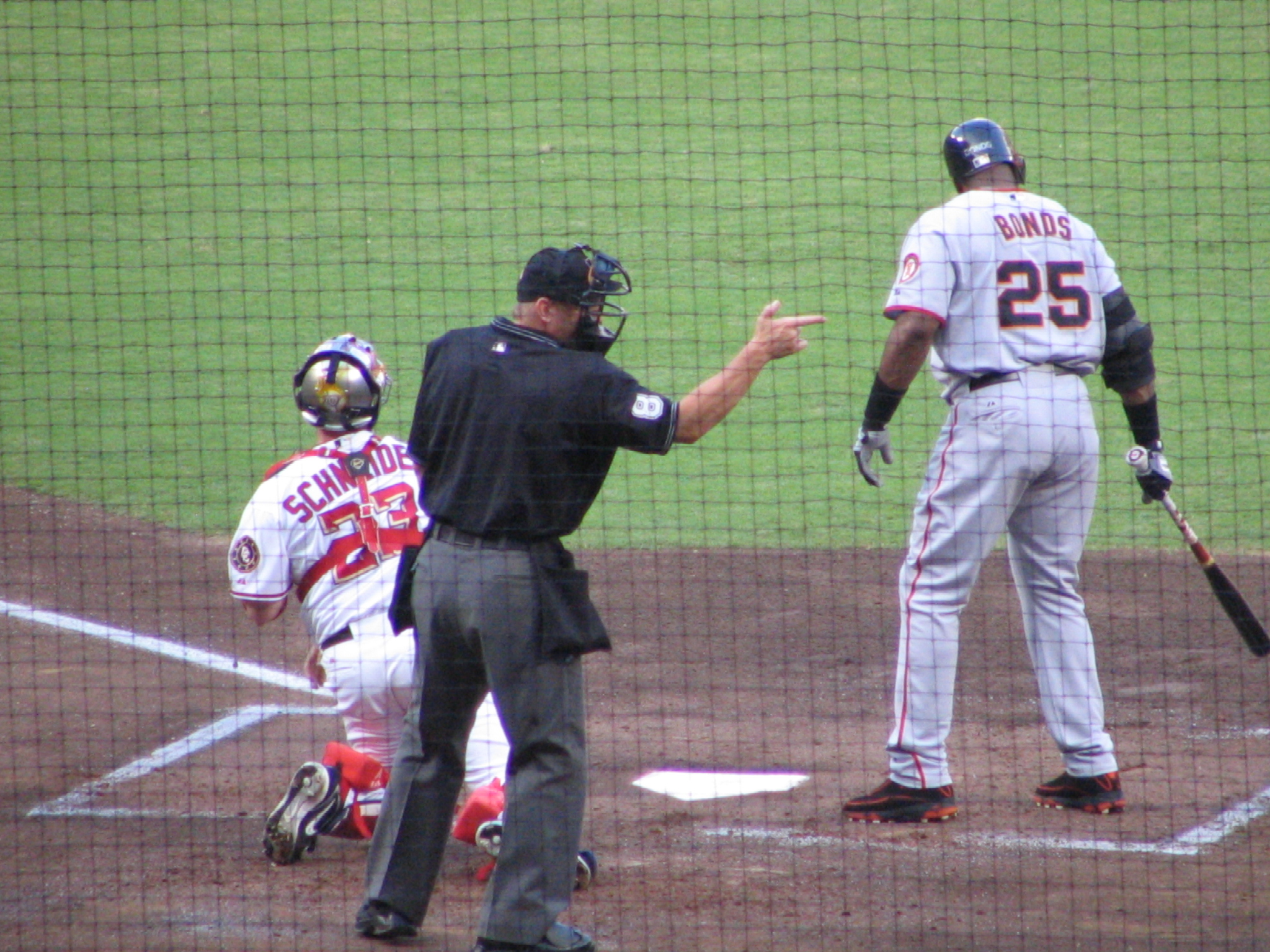
An umpire calling a strike on Barry Bonds (#25)

An umpire's judgment call used to be final, unless the umpire making the call chose to ask partner umpires for help and then decided to reverse it after the discussion. Since 2014, MLB allows managers to challenge plays during the game. If the manager successfully has a call overturned, they are rewarded with another challenge.

An independent study of MLB umpire pitch-call accuracy over 11 seasons (2008–2018) released on April 8, 2019, by Mark T. Williams of Boston University concluded that over 20% of certain pitches were called incorrectly. For the 2018 season, home plate umpires made about 34,000 incorrect ball and strike calls, which is about 14 per game and 1.6 per inning.

If an umpire seems to make an error in rule interpretation, the call, in some leagues, can be officially protested as was the case in MLB until 2019. If the umpire is persistent in his or her interpretation, the matter will be settled at a later time by a league official.

== Amateur umpiring ==
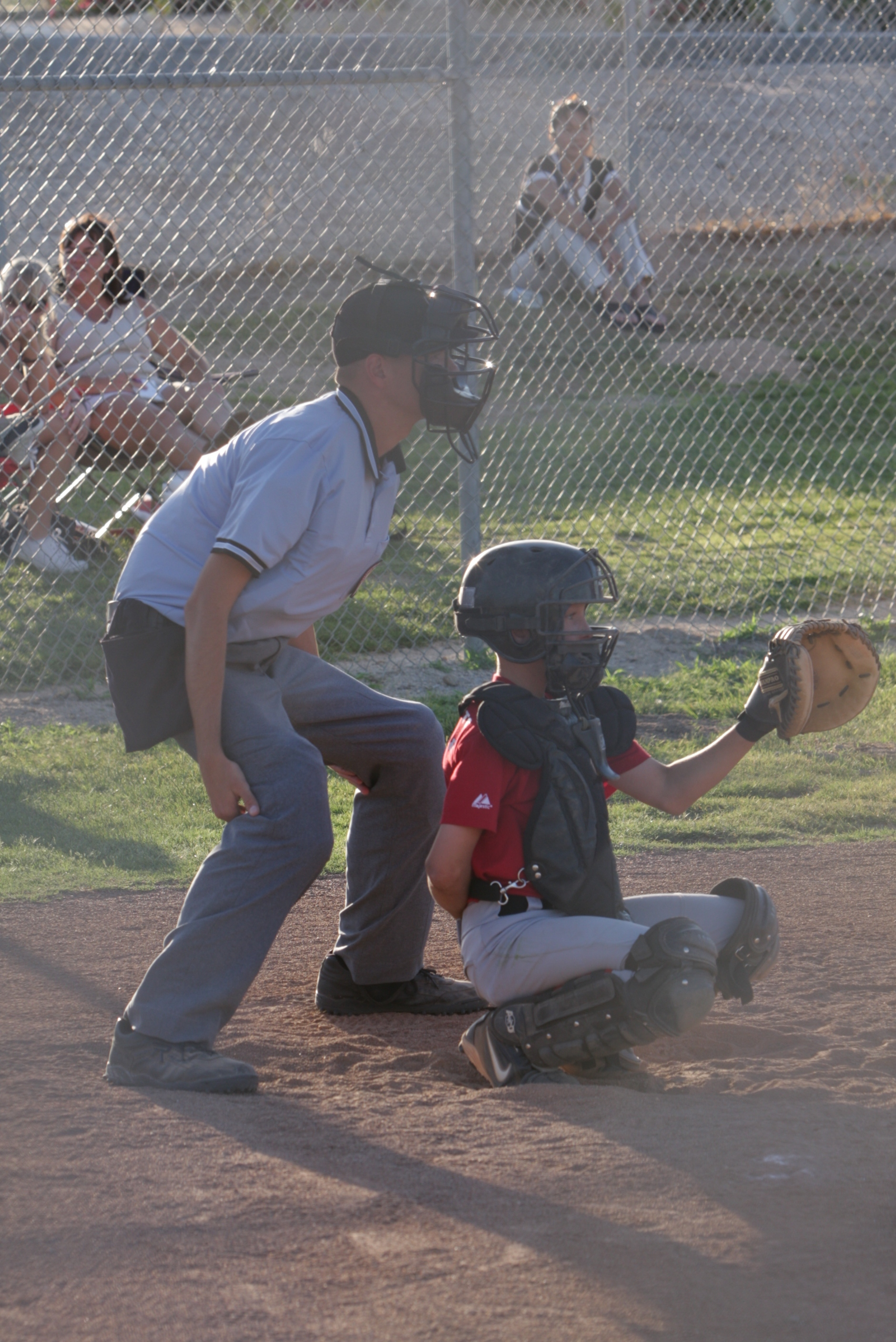
A volunteer umpire officiating a Little League Baseball game

An amateur umpire officiates non-professional or semi-professional baseball. Many amateur umpires are paid (typically on a per-game basis) and thus might be considered professionals, while some amateur umpires are unpaid. According to the Little League Baseball official website, umpires should be volunteers.

There are numerous organizations that test or train anyone interested in umpiring for local leagues, and can help make connections to the leagues in the area. Little League Baseball and the Babe Ruth League are two of the most popular organizations when it comes to youth baseball, and each have their own application, test, and training process for becoming an umpire. In Canada, most umpires are certified through a provincial organization, and then hired by local municipal associations through an umpire in chief.

For the Little League World Series, amateur umpires from around the world participate on a volunteer basis. Prospective Little League World Series umpires must participate at various levels of Little League All-Star tournaments, ranging from district to state to regional tournaments, prior to being accepted to work the World Series tournament.

== High school umpiring ==
In the United States, many (if not most) high schools sponsor a baseball team. Many high schools sponsor multiple baseball teams; for instance, "varsity" and "junior varsity" teams. During the 2017–18 academic year there were 16,513 high schools sponsoring at least one baseball team, and 488,859 students participated on a high school baseball team. Thus, high school baseball is one of the most popular levels of baseball in the United States. Unlike college athletics, there is no competitive national championship on the high school level. And, unlike college athletics, umpires on the high school level are not administered by a national organization (such as the NCAA). Rather, high school baseball is administered at the state level (usually by a statewide high school athletic association) and the qualifications for becoming and remaining a high school umpire are usually set by the entity overseeing high school baseball in each individual state. For example, the Florida High School Athletic Association sets forth minimum requirements for being a high school umpire in Florida. Many statewide high school athletic associations contract with multiple local umpire associations throughout their state in which the local associations agree to train and provide umpires for high school games in each association's geographic area of the state in return for a "booking fee" being paid to the local associations by either the statewide high school association or by individual high schools. The local associations also promise to train their umpires to meet the state high school association's minimum requirements for umpires. For example, in Florida the Jacksonville Umpires Association trains and provides umpires for high school games in the Jacksonville area.

The specific requirements for becoming a high school umpire vary from state-to-state. However, generally all states share the same basic minimum requirements. First, a person trying to become an umpire must usually register with both the state high school athletic association and their local umpire association. Upon registering, most states provide their umpires with a high school rulebook, casebook, and umpires' manual. Second, most states require all umpires to attend clinics and meetings. These clinics may focus on rules, umpire mechanics, or a combination of both. Third, most states also require an umpire to pass a rules exam. Finally, most states also require umpires to work a certain number of pre-season scrimmages prior to working regular season games. As an example of these requirements, Georgia has an "officials accountability program" which sets forth the specific requirements for its interscholastic officials (including the attendance at clinics and camps and the passing of an examination) which can be reviewed here.

Although high school baseball is administered at the state level, the various state high school athletic associations have voluntarily formed the National Federation of State High School Associations. Through the federation, most state athletic associations have agreed to use its rulebook. Thus, while high school baseball is administered on a state level, almost all state associations use the same unique baseball rulebook (and the associated casebook and umpire manual) written specifically for the high school level. As a result, if an individual umpire moves from one state to another state (s)he would likely be using the same rule set in his/her new state as was used in his/her former state. However, there are significant rule differences between the federation's rulebook compared to Major League Baseball (MLB) and NCAA rules. Thus, individuals wanting to umpire on the high school level will have to learn a different set of rules than those they may be familiar with had they previously umpired in a youth league using the MLB or NCAA rulebooks.

Almost exclusively, high school umpires are paid on a per game basis. As they are not salaried, they are not paid if they do not actually umpire a game, although some states require the home school to pay the umpires' travel expenses if they show up to the game site and the game is called, regardless of whether or not it starts. The amount paid differs, often significantly, from state to state. Most high school games are officiated by a two-umpire crew. However, many states use three-umpire and four-umpire crews to officiate playoff games.

== Major League Baseball umpires ==
=== Training ===
Becoming a Major League Baseball umpire requires rigorous training, and very few succeed. Provided the individual makes satisfactory progress throughout, it typically takes from 7–10 years to achieve MLB status. First, a person desiring to become a professional umpire must attend one of two umpiring schools authorized by Major League Baseball: Minor League Baseball Umpire Training Academy or The Harry Wendelstedt Umpire School. The former is owned and operated by Minor League Baseball while the latter is run by former and current Major League and Minor League umpires. Both are located in Florida. There are no prerequisites for attending these schools; however, there is an Umpire Camp, run by Major League Baseball, that is generally considered a "tool for success" at either of these schools. These camps, offered as two separate one-week sessions, are held in November in Southern California. Top students at these camps are eligible to earn scholarships to either of the professional umpire schools in Florida.

After five weeks of training, each school sends its top students to the Minor League Baseball Umpire Development (MiLBUD) evaluation course also held in Florida. Minor League Baseball Umpire Development, "is the entity which is responsible for the training, evaluation, and recommendation for promotion, retention, or release of all umpires in the Minor League Baseball system throughout the United States and Canada." The actual number of students sent on to the evaluation course is determined by MiLBUD using input from the umpire schools. Generally, the top 10 to 20 percent of each school's graduating class will advance to the evaluation course. The evaluation course is conducted by MiLBUD staff, some of whom are also instructors at the Minor League Baseball Umpire Training Academy. The evaluation course generally lasts around 10 days. Depending on the number of available positions in the various minor leagues, some (but not all) of the evaluation course attendees will be assigned to a low level minor league. Out of approximately 300 original umpire school students, about 30-35 will ultimately be offered jobs in Minor League Baseball after the evaluation course.

=== Career development ===
Professional umpires begin their careers in one of the Rookie or Class "A" Short-Season leagues, with Class-A being divided into three levels (Short-Season, Long-Season and Advanced "A"). Top umpiring prospects will often begin their careers in a short-season "A" league (for example, the New York–Penn League), but most will begin in a rookie league (for example, the Gulf Coast League). Since 2008, some umpires who attend the evaluation course, but are not offered jobs in professional baseball may be offered jobs in the Coastal Plain League (a summer wood bat league for collegiate players). During the season, umpires in the Coastal Plain League are evaluated by MiLBUD and they may earn a promotion to a Rookie professional league as a result of injuries or resignations by umpires at higher levels.

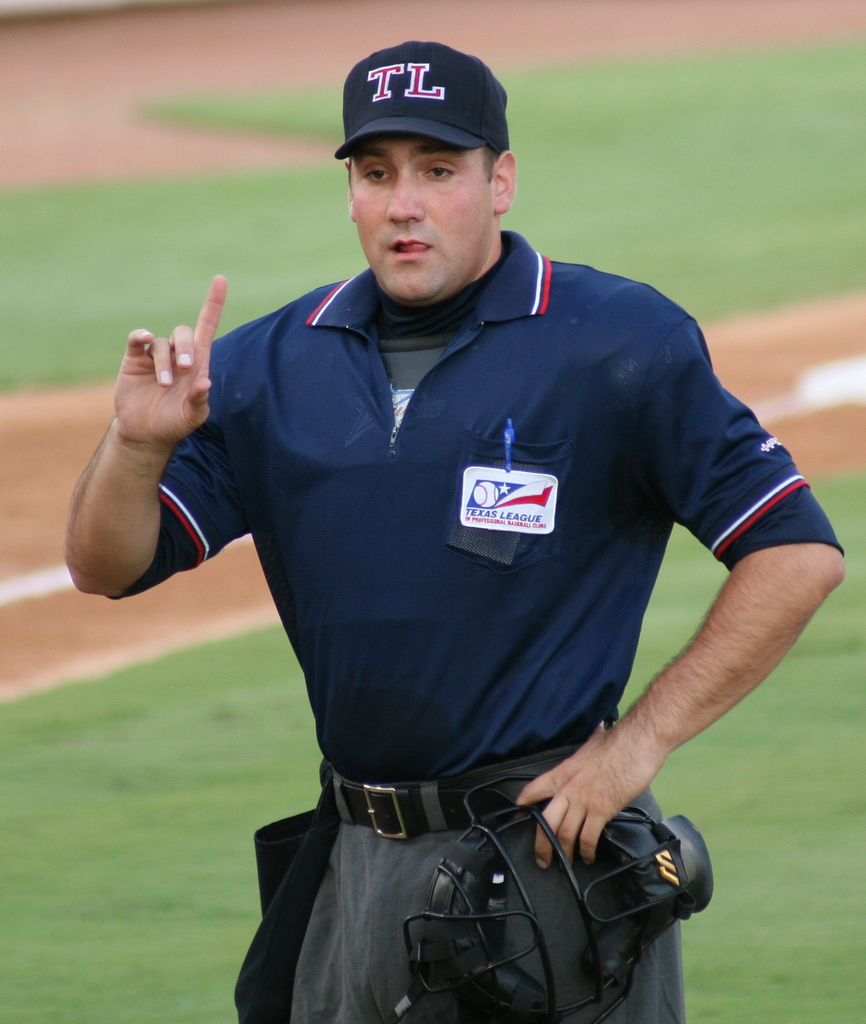
Umpire David Rackley working a Double-A Texas League game in 2006

Throughout the season, all minor league umpires in Rookie leagues, Class-A, and Class-AA are evaluated by members of the MiLBUD staff. All umpires receive a detailed written evaluation of their performance after every season. In addition, all umpires (except those in the rookie or Short Season Class-A leagues) receive written mid-season evaluations.

Generally, an umpire is regarded as making adequate progress "up the ranks" if the umpire advances up one level of Class "A" ball each year (thus earning promotion to Class AA after three to four years) and promotion to Class AAA after two to three years on the Class AA level. However, this is a very rough estimate and other factors not discussed (such as the number of retirements at higher levels) may dramatically affect these estimates. For example, many umpires saw rapid advancement in 1999 due to the mass resignation of many Major League umpires as a collective bargaining ploy.

When promoted to the Class AAA level, an umpire's evaluation will also be conducted by the umpiring supervisory staff of Major League Baseball. In recent years, top AAA prospects, in addition to umpiring and being evaluated during the regular season (in either the International or Pacific Coast League), have been required to umpire in the Arizona Fall League where they receive extensive training and evaluation by Major League Baseball staff. Additionally, top minor league prospects will also be sent to umpire in winter leagues (during Major League and Minor League baseball's off-season) usually located in Australia, the Caribbean, Central America or South America.

In addition, top AAA prospects may also be rewarded with umpiring only Major League preseason games during spring training (in lieu of Class AAA games). Additionally, the very top prospects may umpire Major League regular season games on a limited basis as "fill-in" umpires (where the Class AAA umpire replaces a sick, injured, or vacationing Major League umpire, or is added in doubleheaders to replace either umpire working home plate in doubleheaders).

Finally, upon the retirement (or firing) of a Major League umpire, a top Class AAA umpire will be promoted to Major League Baseball's permanent umpire staff. During this entire process, an umpire evaluated as no longer being a major-league prospect will be released, ending the umpire's professional career. In all, MiLBUD estimates that it will take an umpire seven to eight years of professional umpiring before being considered for a major league position.

As of 2018, major league umpires earn $150,000 to $450,000 per year depending on their experience, with a $340 per diem for hotel and meals, plus first-class commercial airline tickets. Minor league umpires earn from $2,000 to $3,900 per month during the season. Amounts vary based on the umpire's classification and experience.

As of March 2018, there are 19 four-man crews in MLB, for a total of 76 full-time umpires; they are augmented by 16 Class AAA umpires eligible to umpire regular season games, yielding a total roster of 92 MLB umpires. Two umpiring crews are given a series off, while two more crews are assigned to the MLB Replay Office. In addition, Major League Baseball has a rule for doubleheaders where the two umpires who are scheduled for home plate umpiring do not participate in the other game, and the fifth umpire from either the AAA reserve list or from one of two umpire crews not working that week supplements the umpiring crew. The fifth umpire works first base in the first game of the doubleheader (who is assigned to home plate in the second game) and third base in the second game of the doubleheader (replacing the umpire who worked home plate in the first game).

=== Labor relations ===
In the early years of professional baseball, umpires were not engaged by the league but rather by agreement between the team captains. However, by the start of the modern era in 1901, this had become a league responsibility. There is now a unitary major league umpiring roster, although until the 1999 labor dispute that led to the decertification of the Major League Umpires Association, there were separate National and American League umpires. As a result of the 2000 collective bargaining agreement between Major League Baseball and the newly formed World Umpires Association (now known as the Major League Baseball Umpires Association) all umpires were placed on one roster and work in games in both leagues.

In December 2019, MLB and the Major League Baseball Umpires Association agreed in principle to a new five-year labor agreement running through 2024.

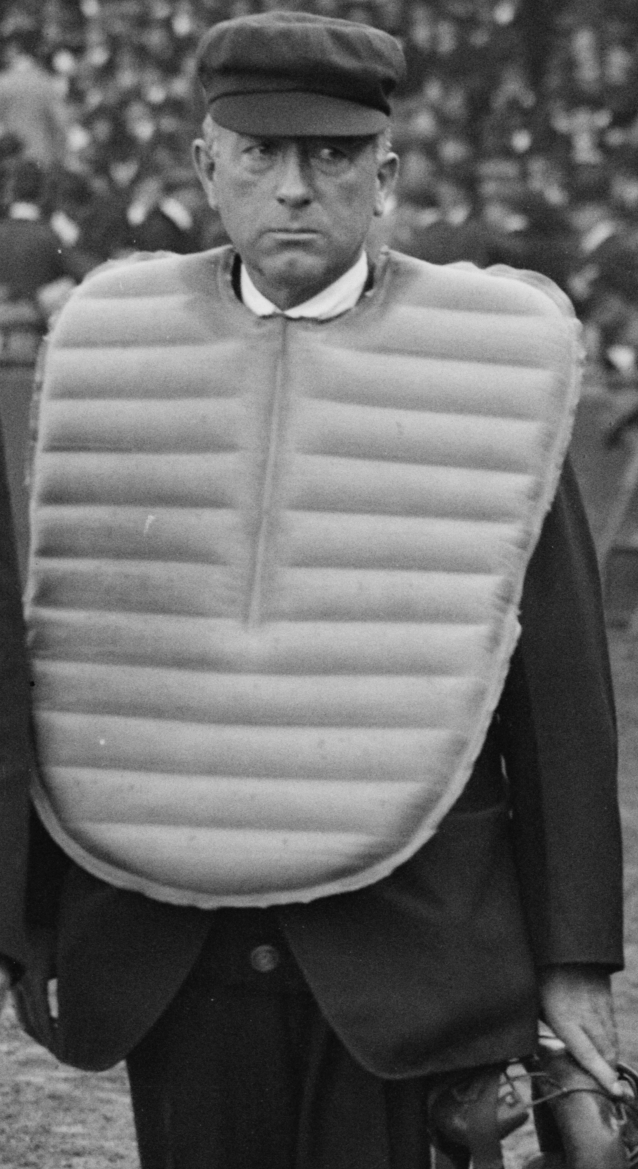
Umpire Tom Connolly shown with the outside chest protector worn by AL home plate umpires for much of the 20th century

== Uniforms ==
Umpires are often referred as "Blue" because of the traditional color of their uniforms. Standardized navy blue suits worn with white shirts and navy ties were adopted as umpire uniforms by the American Association in 1882. This semi-formal and business-like attire elevated the appearance of umpires above the clothing worn by players. The National League adopted the same uniform the following year, as did the American League when it became a major league in 1901. Minor leagues likewise followed suit. For many decades there were no difference between the umpire uniforms of the two major leagues except that National League umpires adopted an inside chest protector worn under their suits while American League umpires wore an outside (or "balloon") protector over their suits when calling balls and strikes at home plate.

In 1968, American League umpires began to wear grey trousers with their blue coats, while National League umpires retained the solid blue suits. That season, AL umpires were also allowed to work both behind the plate and on the bases wearing a long-sleeved light blue shirt with a tie but without the blazer.

In 1970, the National League added a league logo patch to the chest pocket and the umpire's number on the right sleeve of the coat. That same year, the NL also introduced a short-sleeved light blue shirt worn without coat or tie for hot summer games; the American League also adopted the short sleeve variant in 1971. The next season, the AL introduced its current logo and was worn on the pocket of the shirts and blazers.

In 1973, the AL switched to a maroon blazer worn with blue pants, which was used until 1979. In 1975, the American League umpire hats added the abbreviation "AL". Beginning with the 1976 World Series, in cold weather umpires could replace the shirt and tie with a turtleneck sweater (originally light blue for the NL and beige for the AL). In 1977, the use of the outside (balloon) protector was outlawed for new umpires but grandfathered for existing umpires (the last umpire that used one, Jerry Neudecker, retired in 1985). The wearing of ties was phased out, with the 1979 All-Star Game being the last time they were worn.

In 1980, Major League Baseball standardized umpire uniforms for both leagues, adopting a uniform of a blue blazer, grey trousers, and short sleeved light blue shirt, with only the logo patch on the shirt and coat and the either "AL" or "NL" monogrammed caps differentiating them; the AL also added numbers to their umpire uniforms like the NL. Both leagues introduced V-neck sweaters for wear on the bases, with those AL umpires still using the outside chest protector also wearing them occasionally behind the plate. Late in the decade, windbreaker-style jackets and heavier coats similar to those worn by players in the dugouts were adopted as alternatives to the blazer when weather appropriate.

In 1996, the button-down light blue shirt was replaced with a navy blue polo shirt with red and white trim on the collar and sleeve cuffs and red numbers on the sleeve. The simple monograms on the cap were replaced by a large red "N" with the NL logo and "A" with the AL logo respectively. The AL also permitted an optional red polo shirt (an homage to the 1973-79 red blazers) that was not widely used; the notable exceptions were Derryl Cousins, Dale Scott and Durwood Merrill, who frequently wore the red shirts while working home plate, even as their colleagues on the bases wore the navy blue shirts (Scott wore his red shirt behind the plate in Game 3 of the 1998 World Series; Cousins followed suit in the clinching Game 4 of the 1999 Series). The NL added a light blue polo shirt for warm weather in 1997 and was very popular, especially in the humid climates of Atlanta, Miami and St. Louis. Beginning in 2000, after the individual leagues' umpires were consolidated into a single staff, the 1996-99 uniform styles were carried over with "MLB" on the caps instead of the league designations. Only navy blue shirts were worn that season.

During the 2000 postseason, the uniforms switched to black polo shirts with grey slacks, with the hats and chest patches now bearing the MLB logo. The light blue shirt was replaced by a gray shirt, but the blue returned a year later. Long-sleeve versions of the polo shirts are also available for colder weather, as is a short-sleeved turtleneck for use as an undershirt. Outerwear options consist of a black pullover windbreaker with removable lower sleeves and a heavier black dugout coat. Still available, though less commonly seen, is the plate coat, a modern version of the traditional blazer, also in black, which is typically only worn when serving as home plate umpire, where the large lower pockets are used for storing extra baseballs.

== Famous umpires ==
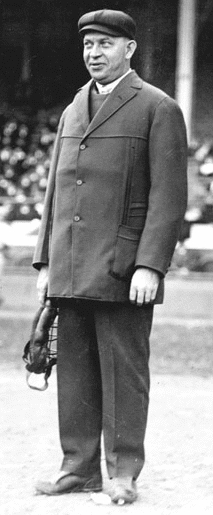
Longtime umpire Bill Klem, a member of the National Baseball Hall of Fame

=== Hall of Fame ===
The following ten umpires have been inducted into the National Baseball Hall of Fame:

- Class of 1953 – Tommy Connolly (NL, 1898–1900; AL, 1901–1931)
- Class of 1953 – Bill Klem (NL 1905–1941)
- Class of 1973 – Billy Evans (AL, 1906–1927)
- Class of 1974 – Jocko Conlan (NL 1941–1964)
- Class of 1976 – Cal Hubbard (AL, 1936–1951)
- Class of 1989 – Al Barlick (NL, 1940–1943, 1946–1955, 1958–1971)
- Class of 1992 – Bill McGowan (AL, 1925–1954)
- Class of 1999 – Nestor Chylak (AL, 1954–1978)
- Class of 2010 – Doug Harvey (NL 1962–1992)
- Class of 2013 – Hank O'Day (NL, 1895, 1897–1911, 1913, 1915–1927)

Conlan and O'Day played in 128 and 232 major league games, respectively, prior to becoming professional umpires.

Several player inductees to the Hall of Fame served as substitute umpires for a small number of games during the early years of baseball; these include Hughie Jennings, Willie Keeler, King Kelly, and Chuck Klein. Additionally, Hall of Fame player inductees Tim Keefe and Ed Walsh umpired professionally in the major leagues after their playing careers ended.

=== Numbers retired by the National and American Leagues ===
Like players, umpires are identified by numbers on their uniforms. National League umpires began wearing numbers in 1970 (though they were assigned numbers in the 1960s) and American League umpires were assigned and began wearing uniform numbers in 1980. The National League umpires' numbers were initially assigned in alphabetical order (Al Barlick wearing number 1, Ken Burkhart number 2, etc.) from 1970 to 1978, which meant that an umpire's number could change each year depending on retirements and other staff changes. In 1979, the National League changed the numbering system and thereafter an umpire's number did not change from year to year. At first, as new umpires, they would be assigned higher numbers (for example, in 1979, Dave Pallone, Steve Fields, Fred Brocklander, and Lanny Harris were assigned numbers 26 to 29 instead of available numbers between 1 and 25). The National League numbering practice changed again in the mid-1980s, when new umpires were assigned previously used numbers (for example, in 1982 Gerry Davis was assigned number 12, previously worn by Andy Olsen, and in 1985 Tom Hallion was assigned number 20, previously worn by Ed Vargo.)

The American League's number assignments were largely random. Bill Haller, the senior American League umpire in 1980, wore number 1 until his retirement following the 1982 World Series, but the number was never reassigned.

In 2000, the American League and National League umpiring staffs were merged into a unified staff under the auspices of Major League Baseball, and all numbers were made available, including the numbers that had been retired by one of the leagues. (For example, the American League had retired Lou DiMuro's number 16 after his death, but it was made available to his son Mike after the staffs were unified.) In the event of duplications, the more senior umpire was given the first choice. (For example, Al Clark in the AL and Jerry Layne in the NL both wore the number 24, but because Clark had more seniority he was assigned 24 and Layne number 26. When Clark was relieved of his duties in 2001, Layne was able to obtain number 24. By comparison, Bruce Froemming was given #6 upon unification of the umpiring staffs since he had worn it longer in the NL than Jim Joyce had worn it in the AL; Joyce subsequently chose #66, unused by any previous umpire. When Froemming retired following the 2007 season, Joyce opted to keep #66, and #6 was last worn by Mark Carlson, who retired following the 2025 season.) From 2020 to 2025, umpires (mainly call-up/reserve umpires used when the regular staff is on vacation) were assigned triple-digit numbers (100+).

From time to time, Major League Baseball retires those numbers for umpires who have given outstanding service to the game, or in honor of umpires who have died.

Since unified umpiring crews were established in 2000, all numbers are available to Major League Baseball umpires, as each retired number was reserved per league. Only one umpire number has been retired since the current format was established, 42, because of the Major League Baseball policy instituted in 1997.

- 1 Bill Klem (NL, 1905–41); currently worn by Bruce Dreckman.
- 2 Nick Bremigan (AL, 1974–89); currently worn by Dan Bellino.
- 2 Jocko Conlan (NL, 1941–64); worn by Jerry Crawford during his tenure in the NL (1977–1999).
- 3 Al Barlick (NL, 1940–43, 1946–55, 1958–71); Later worn by Bill Welke and his brother Tim Welke, currently worn by Dan Merzel.
- 9 Bill Kunkel (AL, 1968–84); also a National Basketball Association referee. Later worn by Brian Gorman, currently worn by Alex MacKay.
- 10 John McSherry (NL, 1971–1996); died at home plate during the Cincinnati Reds-Montreal Expos season opener. Last worn by Phil Cuzzi.
- 16 Lou DiMuro (AL, 1963–82); killed in an auto-related accident after a game in Arlington, Texas. Later worn by his son, Mike DiMuro and currently worn by Lance Barrett.
- 42 Jackie Robinson (retired by Major League Baseball since April 15, 1997.) Worn by Fieldin Culbreth in the American League through 1999; Culbreth switched to #25 when a unified umpiring staff was first used in 2000.

=== Longest major league careers ===
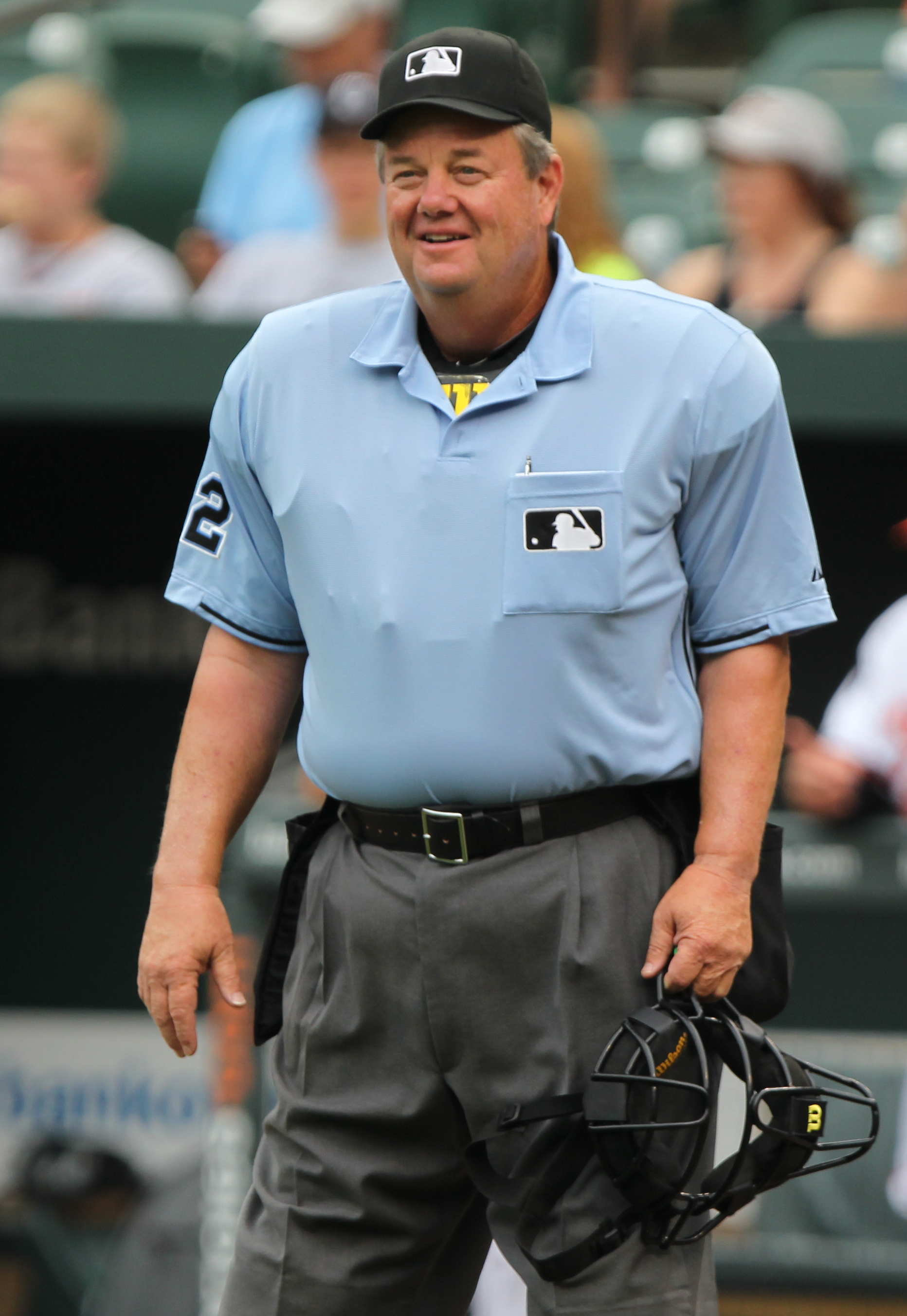
Joe West umpired a record 5,460 games over 43 seasons.

==== Most games ====
Regular-season major league games umpired

- 5,460 – Joe West
- 5,375 – Bill Klem
- 5,163 – Bruce Froemming
- 4,849 – Gerry Davis
- 4,770 – Tommy Connolly
- 4,673 – Doug Harvey

==== Most seasons ====
Seasons where the umpire was on the field. Does not include seasons where the umpire was on staff but not on the field, such as seasons on the injured list/personal leave, or the 2020 season for those who opted out due to the COVID-19 pandemic.

Careers beginning prior to 1920:

- 37 – Bill Klem (NL, 1905–41); Hall of Fame inductee, also holds the record for most World Series appearances (18)
- 35 – Bob Emslie (AA, 1890; NL, 1891–1924); Canadian Baseball Hall of Fame inductee, base umpire for the Merkle's Boner incident
- 34 – Tommy Connolly (NL, 1898–1900; AL, 1901–31); Hall of Fame inductee
- 30 – Hank O'Day (NL, 1895, 1897–1911, 1913, 1915–27); Hall of Fame inductee, umpired the inaugural World Series in 1903, held the record for oldest active umpire (retired age 68 years, two months) for 97 years, plate umpire for the Merkle's Boner incident
- 29 – Bill Dinneen (AL, 1909–37); plate umpire for the inaugural All–Star Game in 1933, called five no-hitters and pitched a no hitter (September 27, 1905) becoming the only man to both pitch and call no-hit baseball games
- 29 – Cy Rigler (NL, 1906–22, 1924–35)
- 25 – Brick Owens (NL, 1908, 1912–13; AL, 1916–37)
- 25 – Ernie Quigley (NL, 1913–37); Canadian Baseball Hall of Fame inductee

Careers beginning from 1920 to 1960:

- 30 – Bill McGowan (AL, 1925–54); Hall of Fame inductee, founded what is currently known as the Harry Wendelstedt Umpire School in 1938
- 28 – Al Barlick (NL, 1940–43, 1946–55, 1958–71); Hall of Fame inductee
- 27 – Bill Summers (AL, 1933–59)
- 26 – Tom Gorman (NL, 1951–76)
- 25 – Nestor Chylak (AL, 1954–78); Hall of Fame inductee
- 25 – Jim Honochick (AL, 1949–73)

Careers beginning since 1960:

- 44 – Joe West (NL, 1976–99; MLB, 2002–2021); recognized by MLB as having the longest tenure of any umpire in MLB history in terms of number of seasons umpired, and has umpired more games than any other MLB umpire, also last umpire to have worked in the 1970s
- 39 – Gerry Davis (NL, 1982–1999; MLB, 2000–2021); owner of officials equipment store; has umpired more postseason games than any other umpire (151)
- 37 – Bruce Froemming (NL, 1971–99; MLB, 2000–07); ejected New York Yankees manager Billy Martin from Game 4 of the 1976 World Series, made controversial ball four call which prevented Milt Pappas' perfect game in 1972
- 36 – Dana DeMuth (NL, 1985–99; MLB, 2000–2019); made (with Jim Joyce) game-ending obstruction call in Game 3 of the 2013 World Series
- 35 – Jerry Crawford (NL, 1976–99; MLB, 2000–2010); son of NL umpire Shag Crawford (1951–75) and brother of National Basketball Association official Joey Crawford (1977–2016)
- 35 – Joe Brinkman (AL, 1972–99; MLB, 2000–06); last active umpire to have used the balloon chest protector (Brinkman switched to the inside protector in 1980), former owner of umpire school, last active AL umpire to work prior to implementation of DH. Ejected Cleveland Indians manager Mike Hargrove from Game 2 of the 1998 American League Division Series after three pitches for arguing balls and strikes
- 35 – Ed Montague (NL, 1974, 1976–99; MLB, 2000–09); One of three umpires (Bill Klem and Bill Summers were the others) to serve as World Series crew chief four times
- 34 – Derryl Cousins (AL, 1979–99; MLB, 2000–2012); last remaining replacement called up during the 1979 umpire strike and last AL umpire to have worn the red blazer (1973–79)
- 34 - Jerry Layne (NL, 1989–1999; MLB, 2000–2024); last remaining umpire hired in the 1980s still working in MLB upon his retirement after the 2024 season
- 34 - Ángel Hernández (NL 1991–1999; MLB, 2000–2024)
- 34 – Mike Reilly (AL, 1977–99; MLB, 2000–2010)

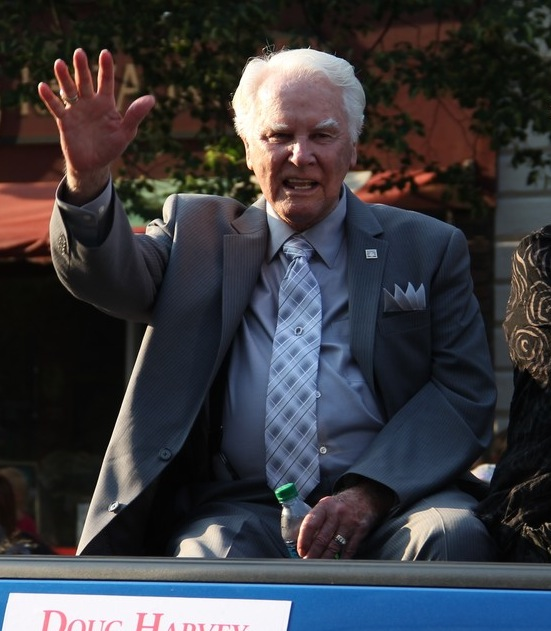
Baseball Hall of Fame inductee Doug Harvey

- 33 – Harry Wendelstedt (NL, 1966–98); The Wendelstedt family operates one of two MLB-approved umpire schools; son Hunter, currently an MLB umpire, took over after Harry's death in 2012.
- 33 – Tim McClelland (AL, 1983–99; MLB, 2000–2013); home plate umpire in Pine Tar Game and home plate umpire for David Wells' perfect game in 1998
- 33 – Tim Welke (AL, 1985–99; MLB, 2000–2015); brother of former umpire Bill Welke (1999–2022), ejected Atlanta Braves manager Bobby Cox from Game 6 of the 1996 World Series
- 33 – Dale Scott (AL, 1987–1999; MLB, 2000–2017); last umpire to eject New York Yankees manager Billy Martin from a game, first openly homosexual umpire
- 32 – John Hirschbeck (AL, 1983–99; MLB, 2000–2016); brother of former umpire Mark Hirschbeck (NL 1987–1999; MLB, 2000–2003), involved in infamous "spitting" incident with Roberto Alomar
- 32 — Mike Winters (NL, 1988–1999; MLB, 2000–2019)
- 32 - Tom Hallion (NL, 1985–1999; MLB, 2006–2022); known for his "whirling dervish" strike-three mechanic, also had a viral discussion with New York Mets manager Terry Collins after pitcher Noah Syndergaard was ejected for throwing behind Chase Utley in 2016.
- 32 — Brian O'Nora (AL, 1992–1999; MLB, 2000–present)
- 31 – Doug Harvey (NL, 1962–92); Hall of Fame inductee, home plate umpire in Game 1 of 1988 World Series, punctuated by dramatic pinch-hit home run by an injured Kirk Gibson, nicknamed "God" for his knowledge of rules and ability to control games.
- 31 – Larry Barnett (AL, 1968–99); Made "no interference" call in Game 3 of the 1975 World Series
- 31 – Dave Phillips (AL, 1971–1999; MLB, 2000–2002); the crew chief during the 1979 Disco Demolition Night at Comiskey Park, ordering the Chicago White Sox to forfeit the second game of a scheduled doubleheader to the visiting Detroit Tigers. First umpire to throw Gaylord Perry out of a game for an illegal pitch (1982), threw out Albert Belle for a corked bat (1994)
- 31 — Gary Cederstrom (AL, 1989–1999; MLB, 2000–2019)
- 31 - Brian Gorman (NL, 1991–1999; MLB, 2000–2021); son of former umpire Tom Gorman (NL, 1951–1977)
- 31 - Larry Vanover (NL, 1993–1999; MLB, 2002–2024)
- 30 - Don Denkinger (AL, 1969–98); made infamous call in Game 6 of the 1985 World Series, then ejected St. Louis Cardinals manager Whitey Herzog and Cardinal pitcher Joaquín Andújar in Game 7. Also worked home plate in Game 7 of the 1991 World Series when the Minnesota Twins' Jack Morris pitched a 10-inning complete game in a 1–0 win vs. the Atlanta Braves. First American League umpire to switch from the outside chest protector to the inside protector in 1975.
- 30 - Jim Joyce (AL, 1987–99; MLB, 2000–2016); umpire whose incorrect call led to Armando Galarraga's near-perfect game

=== Others ===
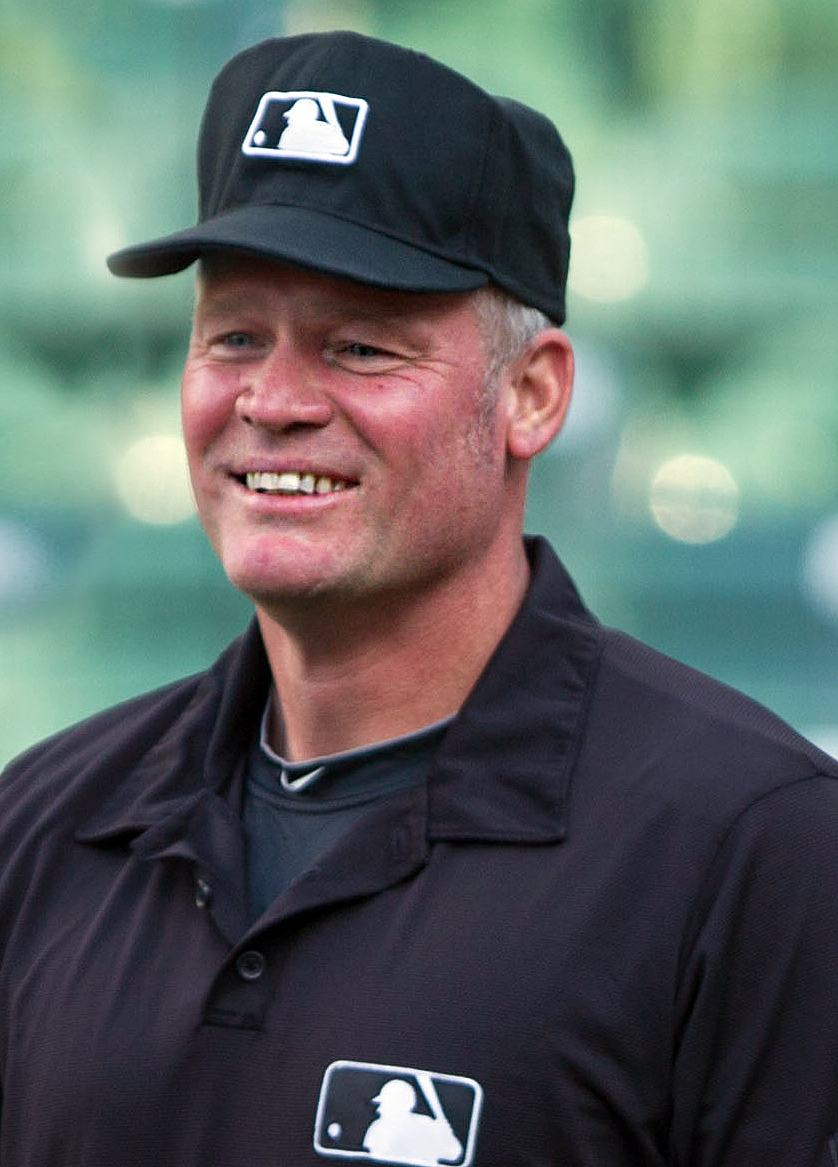
Veteran MLB umpire Ted Barrett

Other noteworthy umpires have included:

- Emmett Ashford (AL, 1966–70); first African-American umpire in Major League Baseball; retired after working 1970 World Series, when he became the first African-American to officiate a championship series or game in a major North American professional sport
- Ted Barrett (AL, 1994–99; MLB, 1999–2022); first umpire to work home plate for two perfect games (and was on the field for three perfect games), worked home plate in Game 3 of the 2018 World Series, the longest game by time and innings in World Series history and ejected Atlanta Braves manager Bobby Cox from a game in 2007, which broke the MLB record for career managerial ejections (132).
- Fred Brocklander (NL, 1979–92); replacement umpire called up during 1979 strike; called Game 6 of the 1986 National League Championship Series
- Jon Byrne (MLB, 2014); the first Australian native to umpire a major league game in the modern era; Australian second baseman Joe Quinn was a substitute umpire for two National League games; one each in 1894 and 1896
- Amanda Clement (SD, 1904–10); first paid female umpire
- Phil Cuzzi (NL, 1991–93, 1999; MLB, 2000–present); holds the record for oldest active umpire since 2025, became first umpire to work a game in their 70s on August 29, 2025
- Kerwin Danley (NL, 1992–1999; MLB, 2000–2021); first African-American crew chief
- Ramon De Jesus (MLB, 2016–present); first major league umpire from the Dominican Republic
- Augie Donatelli (NL, 1950–73); made controversial "phantom tag" call in Game 2 of the 1973 World Series on the New York Mets' Bud Harrelson while sprawled on the ground at home plate in what was his final plate assignment
- Billy Evans (AL, 1906–1927); Hall of Fame inductee, holds the record for youngest active umpire since his debut at age 22 in 1906
- Jim Evans (AL, 1971–99); ran one of only two official umpire schools until decertified after an incident in 2012
- Rich Garcia (AL, 1975–99); first Latino crew chief, infamously ruled 12-year old Jeffrey Maier did not commit fan interference on a fly ball by the Yankees' Derek Jeter during Game 1 of the 1996 American League Championship Series, allowing Jeter's game-tying home run to stand. New York defeated the Baltimore Orioles in five games, then won the Word Series vs. the Atlanta Braves.
- Bernice Gera (NAPBL, 1972); first female umpire in professional baseball
- Manny Gonzalez (MLB, 2010–present); first major league umpire born in Venezuela
- Bill Haller (AL, 1963–82); brother of Major League catcher Tom Haller; last umpire to use outside chest protector in World Series (Game 2 in 1982)
- Sam Holbrook (NL, 1996–99; MLB 2000–2022); made controversial Infield Fly Rule call in the 2012 National League Wild Card Playoff, ejected Washington Nationals manager Dave Martinez from Game 6 of the 2019 World Series, the most recent managerial ejection in World Series play and the first since 1996. Was behind the plate for Game 7 of the 2016 World Series, when the Chicago Cubs defeated the Cleveland Indians in 10 innings to win their first championship since 1908.
- Eddie Hurley (AL, 1947–65); home plate umpire when 3-foot-7 Eddie Gaedel came to bat for the St. Louis Browns on August 19, 1951, and walked on four pitches. Also was home plate umpire for Game 7 of the 1965 World Series, when the Dodgers' Sandy Koufax shut out the Twins on two days' rest.
- Bill Kunkel (AL, 1968–84); former major league pitcher and National Basketball Association official; son Jeff was a major league infielder
- Ron Luciano (AL, 1969–80); All-American lineman for Syracuse University football team in late 1950s; later was an analyst for Major League Baseball on NBC and wrote four books
- Alfonso Márquez (NL, 1999; MLB, 2000–present); first major league umpire born in Mexico, first Latin American born crew chief
- John McSherry (NL, 1971–96); died of a heart attack after seven pitches of 1996 season opener between Expos and Reds
- Jerry Neudecker (AL, 1966–85); last AL umpire to use outside chest protector after league disallowed its use by new umpires starting in 1977
- Jake O'Donnell (AL, 1968–71); also a National Basketball Association official from 1967 to 1995; only man to officiate both MLB and NBA all-star games. Worked the NBA Finals every year from 1972 through 1994.

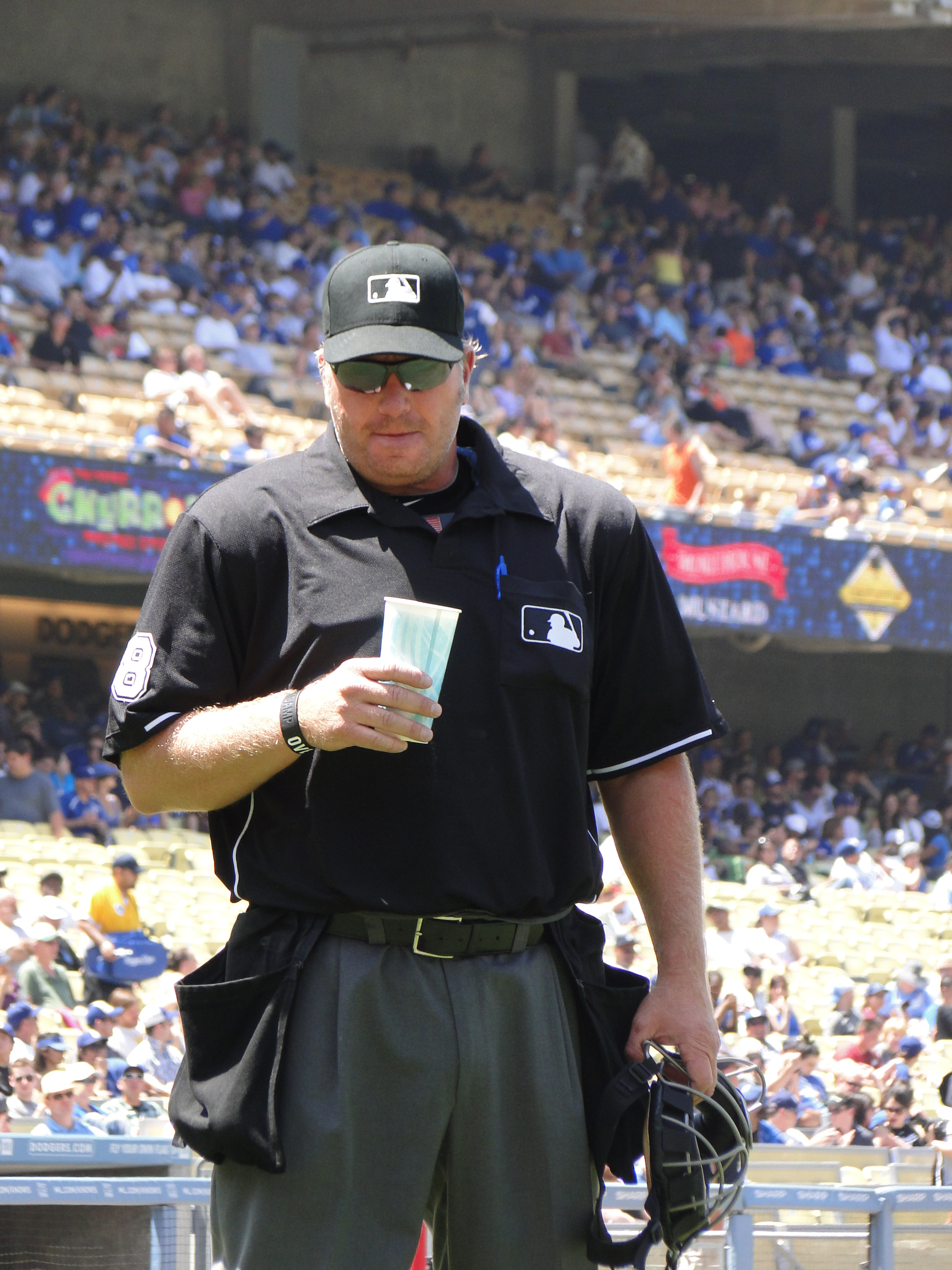
Third-generation MLB umpire Brian Runge

- Silk O'Loughlin (AL, 1902–18)
- Dave Pallone (NL, 1979–88); involved in 1988 shoving incident with then-Reds manager Pete Rose which led to Rose's 30-day suspension
- Steve Palermo (AL, 1977–91); career ended when he suffered spinal cord damage from a gunshot wound suffered on Dallas' Central Expressway while apprehending two armed robbers
- Jen Pawol (MLB, 2025–present); first female umpire to work a regular-season MLB game (August 9, 2025)
- Babe Pinelli (NL, 1935–56); home plate umpire for Don Larsen's perfect game in Game 5 of the 1956 World Series
- Pam Postema (MiLB, 1977–89); first female umpire to work an MLB spring training game (1988), also worked the Hall of Fame Game in the same season
- Beans Reardon (NL, 1926–49); openly defied Bill Klem by using outside chest protector in NL
- Brian Runge (NL, 1999; MLB, 2000–12); first third-generation umpire following father Paul Runge (NL, 1974–97) and grandfather Ed Runge (AL, 1954–70) Ejected Ichiro Suzuki from a game in 2009, the only ejection in Ichiro's professional career (1992–2019).
- Jack Sheridan (PL, 1890; NL, 1892, 1896–97; AL, 1901–14)
- Art Williams (NL, 1972–77); first African-American umpire in the National League, worked the 1975 National League Championship Series
- Charlie Williams (NL, 1978–99; MLB, 2000–01); in 1993, became first African-American umpire to work home plate in a World Series game. Ejected Steve Garvey from a game in 1986, the only ejection in Garvey's 19-year career (1969–1987).

== Current MLB umpiring crews ==
Below are the umpire crews for the 2026 MLB season. Crews frequently change over the course of the year as umpires are injured or on vacation.

Major League Baseball – Umpiring Crews 2026
Crew	Crew Chief	Umpire 2	Umpire 3	Umpire 4
A	2 Dan Bellino	90 Mark Ripperger	43 Shane Livensparger	3 Dan Merzel
B	88 Doug Eddings	76 Mike Muchlinski	47 Gabe Morales	82 Emil Jímenez
C	46 Ron Kulpa	87 Scott Barry	79 Manny González	69 Tom Hanahan
D	64 Alan Porter	28 Jim Wolf	40 Roberto Ortiz	9 Alex MacKay
E	92 James Hoye	17 D.J. Reyburn	84 John Libka	29 Sean Barber
F	98 Chris Conroy	74 John Tumpane	97 Ben May	55 Brennan Miller
G	23 Lance Barksdale	93 Will Little	67 Ryan Additon	20 Ryan Wills
H	49 Andy Fletcher	89 Cory Blaser	52 Jansen Visconti	66 Alex Tosi
I	63 Laz Díaz	7 Brian O'Nora	96 Chris Segal	12 Erich Bacchus
J	51 Marvin Hudson	73 Tripp Gibson	36 Ryan Blakney	48 Nick Mahrley
K	14 Mark Wegner	1 Bruce Dreckman	37 Carlos Torres	34 Nate Tomlinson
L	80 Adrian Johnson	81 Quinn Wolcott	18 Ramon De Jesus	57 Paul Clemons
M	58 Dan Iassogna	54 C.B. Bucknor	35 Jeremie Rehak	38 Adam Beck
N	68 Chris Guccione	86 David Rackley	33 Nestor Ceja	50 Charlie Ramos
O	72 Alfonso Márquez	16 Lance Barrett	83 Mike Estabrook	44 Malachi Moore
P	19 Vic Carapazza	21 Hunter Wendelstedt	59 Nic Lentz	32 Edwin Moscoso
Q	13 Todd Tichenor	11 Tony Randazzo	78 Adam Hamari	15 Clint Vondrak
R	26 Bill Miller	4 Chad Fairchild	62 Chad Whitson	60 Brian Walsh
S	71 Jordan Baker	8 Rob Drake	85 Stu Scheurwater	25 Junior Valentine

Triple-A umpires who have officiated in the Arizona Fall League and were given a number are eligible to fill-in during the Major League Baseball regular season. They temporarily join crews that are missing members. Below are 2026 call-ups.

- 70 John Bacon
- 41 Brock Ballou
- 65 Steven Jaschinski
- 61 James Jean
- 75 Edwin Jímenez
- 77 Austin Jones
- 39 Tyler Jones
- 56 Dexter Kelley
- 94 Jacob Metz
- 99 Felix Neon
- 30 Jonathan Parra
- 95 Jen Pawol
- 53 Derek Thomas
- 45 Willie Traynor

== Etymology ==
According to the Middle English dictionary entry for noumpere, the predecessor of umpire came from the Old French nonper (from non, "not" and per, "equal"), meaning "one who is requested to act as arbiter of a dispute between two people", or that the arbiter is not paired with anyone in the dispute.

In Middle English, the earliest form of this shows up as noumper around 1350, and the earliest version without the n shows up as owmpere, a variant spelling in Middle English, circa 1440.

The n was lost after it was written (in 1426–1427) as a noounpier with the a being the indefinite article. The leading n became attached to the article, changing it to an Oumper around 1475; this sort of linguistic shift is called false splitting. Thus today one says "an umpire" instead of "a numpire".

The word was applied to the officials of many sports before baseball, including association football (where it has been superseded by referee) and cricket (which still uses the word).

== See also ==
- Automated Ball-Strike System, nicknamed "robot umpire" or "robo-ump"
- List of Major League Baseball umpires (disambiguation)
