= Paul Emmel =

American baseball umpire (born 1968)

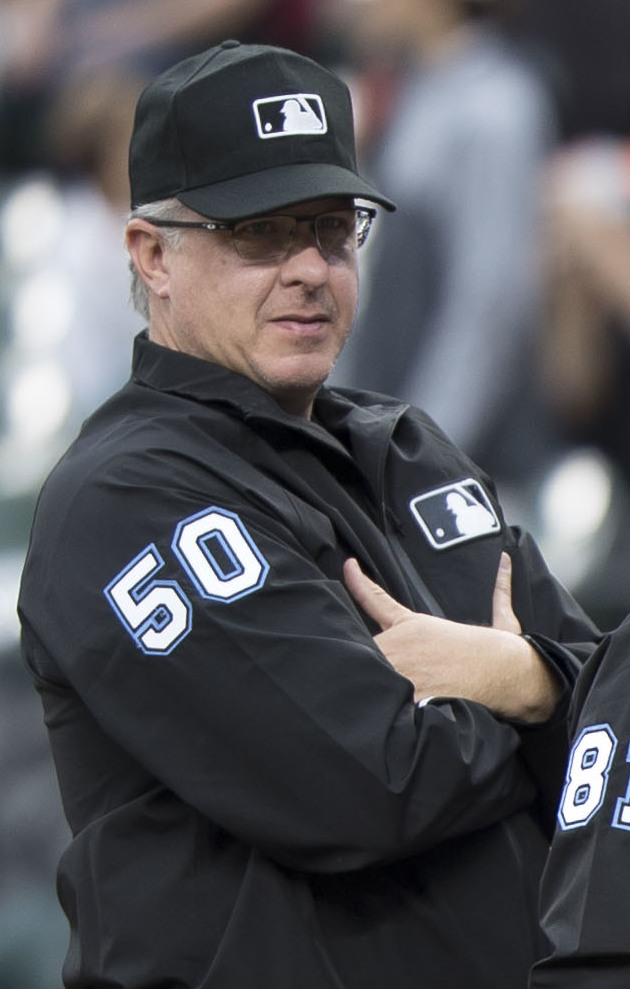
- Emmel in 2017
- Born: May 2, 1968 (age 57); Midland, Michigan, U.S.

MLB debut
- July 31, 1999

Last appearance
- May 21, 2023

Career highlights and awards
- Special Assignments: All-Star Game (2002, 2013); Wild Card Game (2014, 2015); Division Series (2002, 2003, 2006, 2008, 2009, 2010, 2012, 2013); League Championship Series (2007, 2014, 2015); World Series (2013); World Baseball Classic (2009, 2013).

Paul Lewis Emmel (born May 2, 1968) is an American retired Major League Baseball (MLB) umpire. He worked in the National League in 1999, and throughout both major leagues from 2000 to 2023. Emmel was named a crew chief in 2017 and wore uniform number 50.

== Career ==
Prior to reaching the major leagues in 1999, Emmel worked in the New York–Penn League (1992–1993), South Atlantic League (1994), California League (1995), Florida State League (1996), Eastern League (1996–1997), and International League (1998).

Emmel missed the 2018 season, returning in 2019, but again missing work in July and part of August. He missed the 2020 and 2021 seasons with knee and leg issues. He returned to MLB in the 2022 season. Emmel retired before the 2025 season began.

=== Controversies ===
Emmel ejected Atlanta Braves manager Bobby Cox from Game 2 of the 2010 NLDS for disputing an out call on the grounds that San Francisco Giants first baseman Aubrey Huff had come off of first base.

=== Notable games ===
Emmel has umpired two All-Star Games (2002, 2013); two Wild Card Games (2014, 2015); eight Division Series (2002, 2003, 2006, 2008, 2009, 2010, 2012, 2013); three League Championship Series (2007, 2014, 2015); and the 2013 World Series. He has also officiated in two World Baseball Classics (2009, 2013).

Emmel was the second base umpire when Detroit Tigers pitcher Justin Verlander threw a no-hitter at Comerica Park against the Milwaukee Brewers on June 12, 2007. Five days prior to Verlander's no-hitter, Emmel was also at second base in a game between the Boston Red Sox and the Oakland Athletics in which Boston pitcher Curt Schilling had a no-hitter until Shannon Stewart broke up the no-hitter with a single with two outs in the bottom of the ninth inning.

On May 8, 2012, Emmel was the plate umpire for Josh Hamilton's four-homer game.

On June 23, 2016, Emmel suffered a scalp laceration requiring stitches after being struck by an errant bat, which slipped from the grasp of Los Angeles Angels' pinch hitter Jefry Marté during a swinging strike, in a game between the Angels and the Oakland Athletics.

On September 1, 2019, Emmel was the home plate umpire when Houston Astros pitcher Justin Verlander threw a no-hitter against the Toronto Blue Jays.

== Personal life ==
Emmel is a graduate of Central Michigan University with a B.A. in finance (1991). He lives in the Denver area and has two children.

In late 2020, Emmel was honored by the Points of Light foundation for his work as the UMPS CARE charities secretary, among other charity activities.

== See also ==
- List of Major League Baseball umpires (disambiguation)
