= Jerry Layne =

American baseball umpire (born 1958)

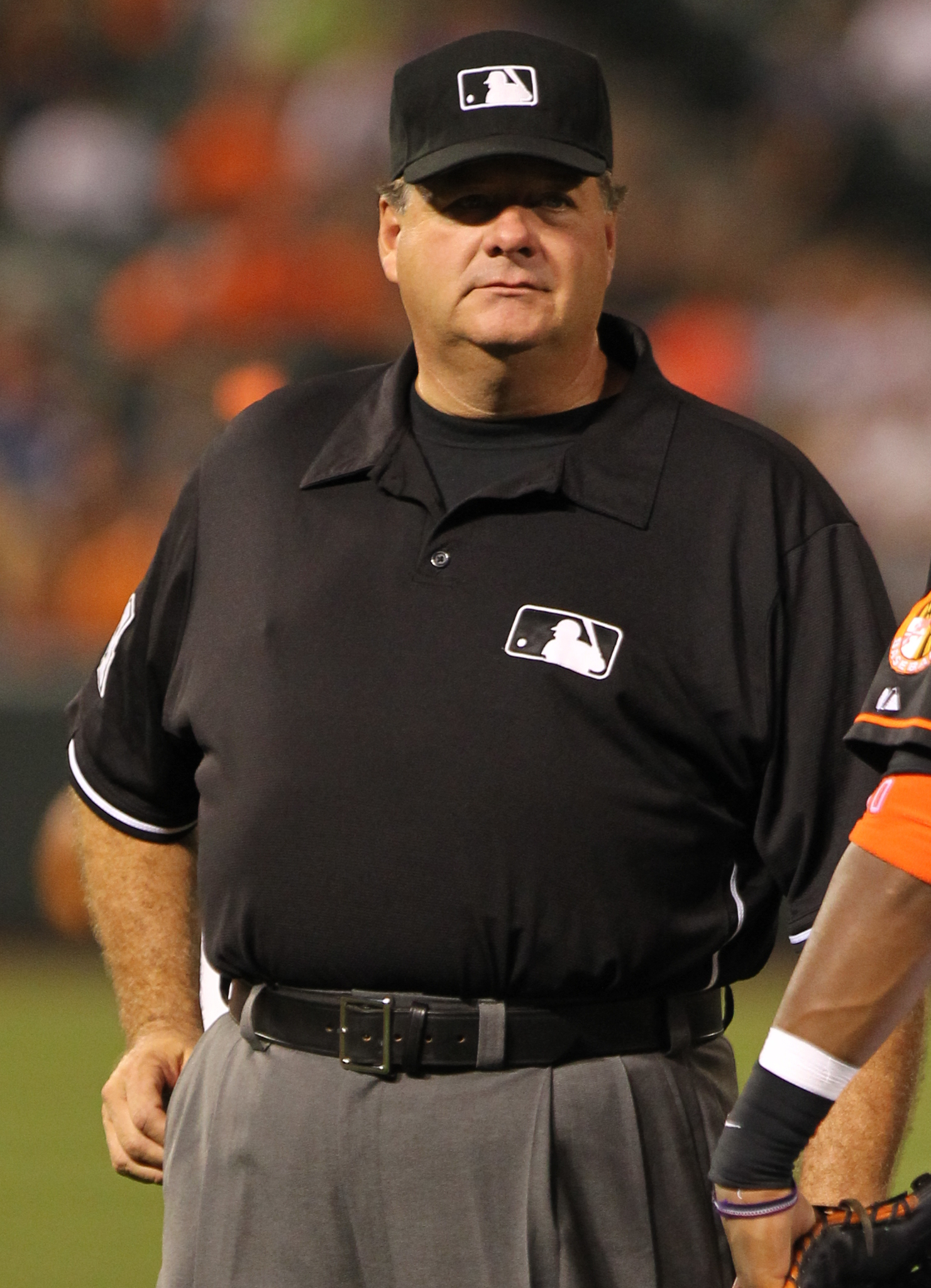
- Layne in 2011
- Born: September 28, 1958 (age 67); Pikeville, Kentucky, U.S.

MLB debut
- April 19, 1989

Last MLB appearance
- July 9, 2023

Career highlights and awards
- Special Assignments: 3 All-Star Games (1994, 2001, 2011); Wild Card Game (2012); 11 Division Series (1995, 1998, 2001, 2002, 2005, 2010, 2011, 2013, 2014, 2017, 2018); 5 League Championship Series (1997, 1999, 2006, 2009, 2012); 2 World Series (2005, 2011)

Jerry Blake Layne (born September 28, 1958) is an American former umpire in Major League Baseball who has worked in the National League between 1989 and 1999, and throughout both major leagues from 2000 to 2024. He wore uniform number 24 in the NL, but when MLB merged the AL and NL umpiring staffs in 2000, Layne was forced to switch to number 26, as AL umpire Al Clark, who also wore 24, had more seniority. When Clark was fired midway through the 2001 season by MLB, Layne reclaimed number 24 and wore it until his retirement. Upon Joe West's retirement in 2022, Layne became MLB's most senior active umpire.

== Umpiring career ==
In October 2005, Layne umpired in his first World Series. He was also the home plate umpire when Barry Bonds hit his record 71st home run in 2001, and for the no-hitter pitched by Fernando Valenzuela of the Los Angeles Dodgers on June 29, 1990, at Dodger Stadium.

Layne was chosen as one of the umpires for the one-game Wild Card playoff between the Baltimore Orioles and the Texas Rangers on October 5, 2012. In 2014, he was chosen as one of the three MLB umpire representatives for the Japan All-Star Series. Layne formally retired before the 2025 season began.

=== Injuries ===
On August 18, 2006, Layne was the plate umpire for a game between the Atlanta Braves and the Florida Marlins. In the 8th inning, he was struck by the barrel of a broken bat swung by the Marlins' Hanley Ramírez. Layne's injury delayed the game for 13 minutes, and he was carted off the field. X-rays were negative and Layne escaped serious injury, suffering only a bruised jaw.

On June 7, 2008, Layne was the plate umpire when he sustained a mild concussion from being hit by a foul ball in the top of the third inning of a game between the New York Yankees and Kansas City Royals.

While serving as the plate umpire during a June 2012 game between the Minnesota Twins and the Cincinnati Reds, Layne was struck in the side of the head by a piece of Devin Mesoraco's broken bat. Layne would leave the game, being replaced behind the plate by Bob Davidson.

On April 19, 2016, Layne injured his right leg after jumping and landing awkwardly while attempting to avoid being hit by a batted ball.

During the 2016 season, Layne was forced to leave three different games early while umpiring home plate, due to being struck in the head by foul balls or errant pitches.

On April 19, 2018, Layne was the home plate umpire between the Boston Red Sox and Los Angeles Angels. He exited the game in the bottom of the first inning after a foul ball by Mike Trout hit him in his right arm near his elbow and biceps.

On April 28, 2021, Layne was the home plate umpire between the Boston Red Sox and New York Mets. He exited the game in the bottom of the third inning after a foul ball hit him in the head.

=== Notable calls ===
On June 17, 1997, Layne ejected Cincinnati Reds manager Ray Knight for arguing after Layne ruled that Cincinnati's Deion Sanders was out at third base. After he was thrown out, Knight kicked dirt on the base and then picked it up and hurled it to the ground.

In August 2003, Layne ejected Kansas City Royals catcher Mike DiFelice after Layne ruled that Minnesota Twin Torii Hunter was safe in a play at the plate. Following his ejection, DiFelice threw a glove into the crowd and also tossed a pair of water coolers as well as a trash can out of the dugout.

On October 19, 2011, Layne was the plate umpire when Adrián Beltré nicked a ball off of his foot to St. Louis Cardinals third basemen David Freese in Game 1 of the 2011 World Series, which, by rule, is a dead ball. Layne ruled that Beltre was not touched by the ball and play continued, despite Beltre hopping around home plate as if in pain. Infrared replays showed that the ball appeared to have narrowly clipped Beltre's foot and that the ball should have been called foul or dead by virtue of batter's interference. Layne inspected the ball after Rangers manager Ron Washington argued the call; however Layne did not see any scuff from Beltre's shoe and upheld his original call.

On October 28, 2011, Layne was the plate umpire for Game 7 of the 2011 World Series, as the St. Louis Cardinals hosted the Texas Rangers. During this contest, baseball's computerized Pitch f/x system indicated Layne missed 17 ball/strike calls, with 14 of these calls benefiting the Cardinals and three benefiting the Rangers. Most notably, with St. Louis leading 3–2 in the bottom of the fifth inning, the Cardinals loaded the bases as Yadier Molina stepped to the plate with two outs. Molina took a 3–2 fastball from Scott Feldman for a called fourth ball, allowing a run to score as opposed to ending the inning had the pitch been called a strike. Pitch f/x indicates the pitch was located within the strike zone.

On April 30, 2017, Layne was the crew chief when the Arizona Diamondbacks hosted the Colorado Rockies. In the bottom of the tenth inning with no score, the Diamondbacks had A.J. Pollock on first base as the potential winning run with one out. David Peralta hit a ground ball to Rockies second baseman D.J. LeMahieu, and LeMahieu ran into Pollock (intentionally, as replays later showed), who was about five feet from the ball. Pollock ended up at third base, with Peralta at first. Second base umpire Toby Basner (the umpire closest to the play) initially made no call, which meant no interference. After the play, Layne brought the umpires together, and after a brief discussion, overturned the no interference call and called Pollock out, even though the no interference call was the correct call. However, the Diamondbacks were not hindered by this call, as they won the game in thirteen innings.

== See also ==
- List of Major League Baseball umpires (disambiguation)
