= Great Britain national baseball team =

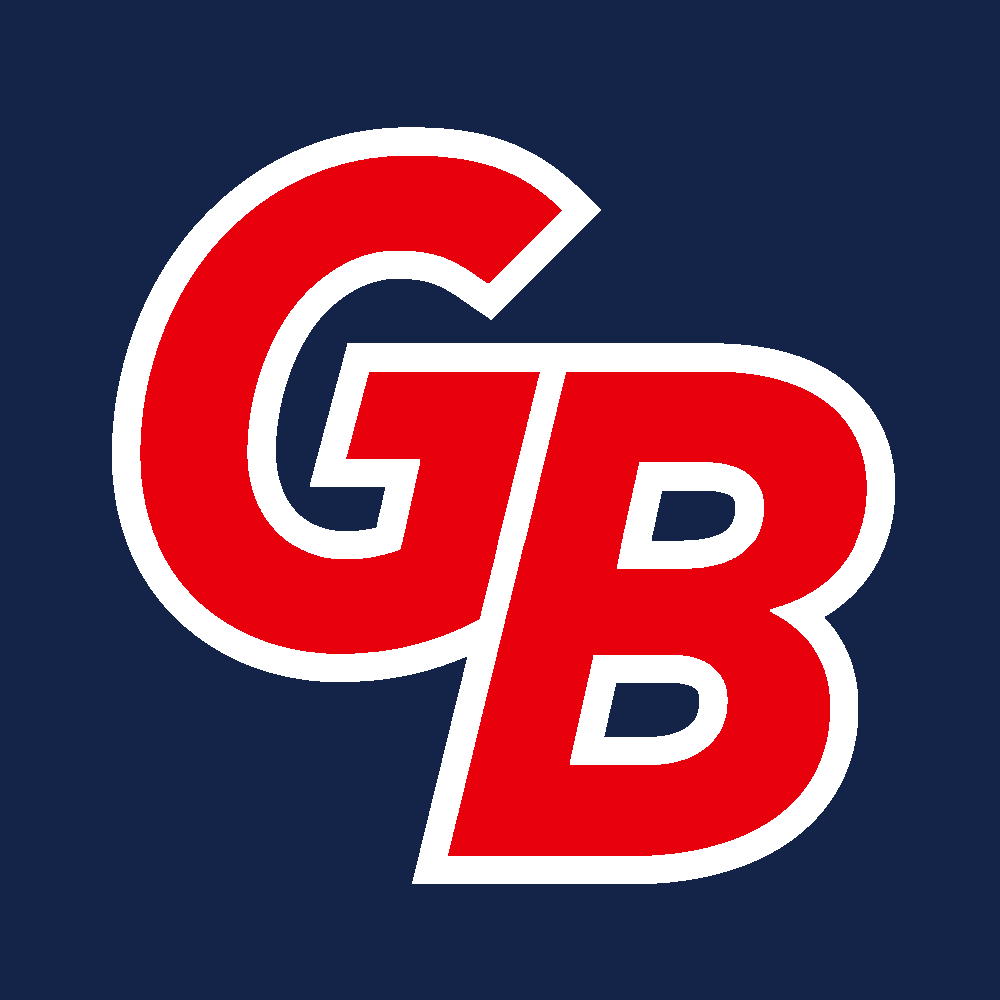

Information
- Country: United Kingdom
- Federation: British Baseball Federation
- Confederation: Confederation of European Baseball
- Manager: Bradley Marcelino
- Captain: (The Bahamas) Jazz Chisholm Jr. (United Kingdom) (United States) Harry Ford

WBSC ranking
- Current: 20 ▼1 (26 March 2026)
- Highest: 17 (23 July 2025)
- Lowest: 38 (2 times; latest in December 2018)

Uniforms
Home	Away

Olympic Games
- Appearances: 0

World Baseball Classic
- Appearances: 2 (first in 2023)
- Best result: 15th (2023)

World Cup
- Appearances: 2 (first in 1938)
- Best result: (gold) 1st (1 time, in 1938)

Intercontinental Cup
- Appearances: 0

European Championship
- Appearances: 15 (first in 1967)
- Best result: (silver) 2nd (3 times, most recent in 2023)

The Great Britain national baseball team commonly known by its nickname "The Union Jack," is the national men's baseball team of the United Kingdom. It is governed by the British Baseball Federation, and is also a member nation of the Confederation of European Baseball.

The team competed in the 2026 World Baseball Classic in March 2026, coming fourth in its bracket.

== History ==
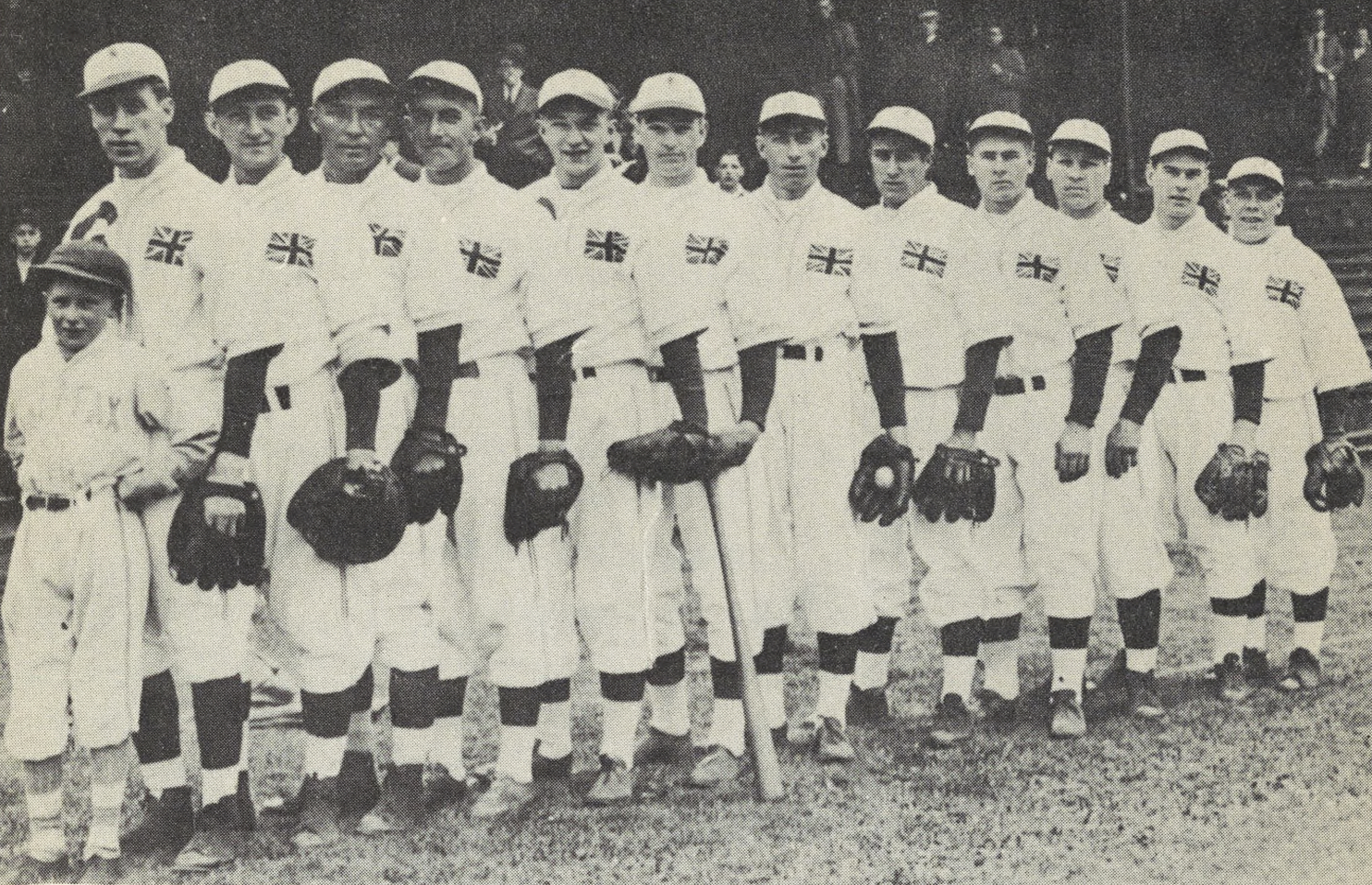
Great Britain won the first Amateur World Series in 1938

The British team, managed by George McNeil, won the inaugural Baseball World Cup in 1938, beating the United States by four games to one in the series hosted in England. This series was subsequently declared the first world championship of amateur baseball by the International Baseball Federation, and so Great Britain became the first amateur world champions. With the backing of Sir John Moores a team was set to compete in the 1939 series, in Havana, as defending champions. In doing so they would have become the first national representative team to compete outside of the United Kingdom but the outbreak of the Second World War interrupted the development of baseball in the United Kingdom, the team withdrew and the sport entered into decline domestically. So severe was the impact of the Second World War on baseball in the United Kingdom that it was over 70 years before the team qualified for another world championship event, when they reached the 2009 Baseball World Cup by virtue of its second-place finish at the 2007 European Baseball Championship.

In 2007, the Great Britain team won the silver medal at the European Baseball Championship, finishing top of Group B and only losing two games in the tournament. It ultimately finished second overall to the Netherlands. This marked Britain's highest placing in the tournament since its first entry into the event in 1967, when it also finished second.

Prior to 2007 the team's showing in the European Baseball Championship was generally limited to finishing in the lower half of the standings, which often resulted in relegation to the secondary tournament known as the European Baseball Championship Qualifier (sometimes referred to as the 'B-Pool'). In 1988 and 1996 Great Britain hosted and won the Qualifier, thereby returning to the main European Championship event the following year (sometimes referred to as the 'A-Pool'). Since the silver medal in 2007, Great Britain has on occasion had to repeat the process of qualification through the B-Pool.

By winning the silver medal in 2007 Great Britain qualified both for the 2009 Baseball World Cup and for the Final Qualifying Tournament in Taiwan for the 2008 Summer Olympics. However, a lack of funding including a refusal by UK Sport to provide any backing meant it was forced to withdraw from the Final Qualifying Tournament and was replaced by Germany. This was the Great Britain team's last chance to qualify for an Olympic baseball competition due to the earlier decision by the International Olympic Committee (IOC) to remove baseball from the Games after 2008. That decision – announced one day after London had been awarded the 2012 Olympics on 6 July 2005 – also meant that the Great Britain baseball team would not have the opportunity to play in front of a home crowd in the 2012 London Olympics and to promote the sport in the United Kingdom. It also meant that the team ceased to receive elite funding from bodies such as UK Sport.

At the 2009 World Cup – held simultaneously in various countries around Europe – Britain qualified out of the first group stage before eventually finishing 15th overall. Following the World Cup, in October 2009 the IBAF announced a new set of world rankings in which Britain rose to 21st., though they since dropped to 32nd as of 2017. Great Britain was invited to compete in the qualifying round of the 2013 World Baseball Classic. In 2016 Hall of Fame inductee Trevor Hoffman joined the coaching staff, honouring his maternal English ancestry, with his grandfather having been a professional footballer in the Football League. Great Britain competed in the qualifying round of the 2017 World Baseball Classic, where it was defeated in the finals by Team Israel.

On 20 September 2022, Great Britain qualified for its first World Baseball Classic by defeating Spain 10–9 in 10 innings in Regensburg, Germany.

== Notable figures ==
Hall of Fame inductee Trevor Hoffman has previously coached the Great Britain national team, as has the English-born former Major League Baseball player Lance Painter. The most high-profile recent player to represent the United Kingdom as a player is Jazz Chisholm Jr. Former major leaguer Vance Worley has also played for the team, starting the qualifying game against Spain in 2022 that clinched a spot in the 2023 World Baseball Classic.

== Coaching staff ==
Position	Name
(United Kingdom) Brad Marcelino	Manager
(United Kingdom) Liam Carroll	Bench coach
(United States) Zach Graefser	Pitching coach
(United States) TS Reed	First base coach
(United Kingdom)	Third base coach
(United Kingdom)	Bullpen coach
(Northern Ireland) Jesse Guffey	Athletic trainer
(United Kingdom) Alan Dean	Strength coach

== Current roster ==
The team's roster for the 2026 World Baseball Classic. Very few members of the team were born in Great Britain, instead qualifying through British parents or grandparents, and almost none of them played in the domestic league.

Great Britain roster – 2026 World Baseball Classic
Players		Coaches
Pitchers: 62 Jack Anderson; 19 Brendan Beck; 43 Tristan Beck; 41 Donovan Benoit; 33 Dylan Covey; 46 Chavez Fernander; 17 Gary Gill Hill; 45 Miles Langhorne; 35 Ryan Long; 22 Michael Petersen; 96 Graham Spraker; 8 Najer Victor; 21 Tyler Viza; 23 Nick Wells; 34 Owen Wild; 49 Vance Worley	Catchers: 30 Will Cresswell; 1 Harry Ford; Infielders: 3 Jazz Chisholm Jr.; 18 Nate Eaton; 9 Lucius Fox; 15 Ivan Johnson; 6 Ian Lewis Jr.; 7 BJ Murray; 5 Nick Ward; Outfielders: 29 Matt Koperniak; 59 Kristian Robinson; 28 Trayce Thompson; 13 Justin Wylie	Manager: 2 Brad Marcelino; Coaches: 51 Conor Brooks (bullpen); 31 Albert Cartwright (assistant); 54 Barry Enright (pitching); 26 Zach Graefser (pitching); 88 Dillon Lawson (hitting); 81 TS Reed (assistant); 12 Jeff Salazar (third base); 76 Tanner Swanson (bench); 52 Matt Talarico (first base); 50 Matt Ward (bullpen)
Updated: March 1, 2026

== Results and fixtures ==
The following is a list of professional baseball match results currently active in the latest version of the WBSC World Rankings, as well as any future matches that have been scheduled.

Legend

Win Lose Void or postponed Fixture

=== 2022 ===
World Baseball Classic Q	16 September	Great Britain	14–4 (F/8)	France	Regensburg, Germany
World Baseball Classic Q	19:00 CET	WP: McKenzie Mills (1-0); HR: Harry Ford (1)	Boxscore	LP: Kevin Canelon (0-1); HR: Ivan Acuna (1)	Attendance: 897; Umpires: Jon Byrne

World Baseball Classic Q	17 September	Great Britain	8–1	Germany	Regensburg, Germany
World Baseball Classic Q	19:00 CET	WP: Akeel Morris (1-0); HR: Justin Wylie (1), Harry Ford (2)	Boxscore	LP: Brian Flynn (0-1)	Attendance: 2,216; Umpires: Tyler Jones (HP), Jon Byrne (1B), Sam Burch (2B), Young Chou Kwon (3B)

World Baseball Classic Q	20 September	Spain	9–10 (F/10)	Great Britain	Regensburg, Germany
World Baseball Classic Q	19:00 CET	LP: Rhiner Cruz; HR: Noelvi Marte (1)	Boxscore	WP: Tahnaj Thomas; HR: Harry Ford (3), D'Shawn Knowles (1), Jaden Rudd (1)	Attendance: 1,186; Umpires: HP: Young Chou Kwon, 1B: Roberto LaMadrid, 2B: Darius Ghani, 3B: Mark Winters

=== 2023 ===
World Baseball Classic GS	11 March	Great Britain	2–6	United States	Phoenix, United States
World Baseball Classic GS	19:00 MT	LP: Vance Worley (0–1); HR: Trayce Thompson (1)	Boxscore	WP: Adam Wainwright (1–0); HR: Kyle Schwarber (1)	Attendance: 39,650; Umpires: HP – Carlos Torres, 1B – Felix Tejada, 2B – Bill Miller, 3B – Jhonatan Biarreta

World Baseball Classic GS	12 March	Great Britain	8–18 (F/7)	Canada	Phoenix, United States
World Baseball Classic GS	12:00 MT	LP: Akeel Morris (0–1); HR: Harry Ford (1)	Boxscore	WP: Phillippe Aumont (42–0); HR: Edouard Julien (1), Owen Caissie (1)	Attendance: 11,555; Umpires: HP – Felix Tejada, 1B – Bill Miller, 2B – Jhonatan Biarreta, 3B – Carlos Torres

World Baseball Classic GS	13 March	Colombia	5–7	Great Britain	Phoenix, United States
World Baseball Classic GS	12:00 MT	LP: Yapson Gomez (0–1); HR: Dilson Herrera (1)	Boxscore	WP: Graham Spraker (1–0); Sv: Ian Gibaut (1); HR: Harry Ford (2)	Attendance: 10,416; Umpires: HP – Jhonatan Biarreta, 1B – Cory Blaser, 2B – Felix Tejada, 3B – Doug Eddings

World Baseball Classic GS	14 March	Great Britain	1–2	Mexico	Phoenix, United States
World Baseball Classic GS	19:00 MT	LP: Tahnaj Thomas (0–1)	Boxscore	WP: JoJo Romero (1–0); Sv: Giovanny Gallegos (1)	Attendance: 17,705; Umpires: HP – Cory Blaser, 1B – Carlos Torres, 2B – Félix Tejada, 3B – Jhonatan Biarreta

=== 2025 ===
Euro Championship GS	20 September	Netherlands	9–3	Great Britain	Rotterdam, Netherlands
Euro Championship GS	20:30 CEST	WP: Lars Huijer; Sv: Kevin Kelly; HR: Didi Gregorius, Eugene Helder, Jonathan Schoop, Sharlon Schoop, Hendrik Clementina	Boxscore	LP: Ryan Long	Attendance: 3,000

Euro Championship GS	21 September	Great Britain	16–1 (F/8)	Israel	Rotterdam, Netherlands
Euro Championship GS	13:00 CEST	WP: Zachary Angus Cameron; HR: Quinn Joshua Irving Allen, Nick Ward	Boxscore	LP: Josh Wolf	Attendance: 257

Euro Championship GS	22 September	France	4–9	Great Britain	Rotterdam, Netherlands
Euro Championship GS	13:00 CEST	LP: Thibault Mercadier	Boxscore	WP: Donovan Benoit	Attendance: 193

Euro Championship QF	25 September	Spain	7–0	Great Britain	Rotterdam, Netherlands
Euro Championship QF	18:00 CEST	WP: Pablo Guillén	Boxscore	LP: Nick Wells	Attendance: 133

Euro Championship RR	26 September	Great Britain	3–2	Croatia	Rotterdam, Netherlands
Euro Championship RR	18:00 CEST	WP: Andrew Campbell; Sv: Jack Seppings	Boxscore	LP: Carlos Garcia Troncoso; HR: Kruno Gojković	Attendance: 85

Euro Championship 5th	27 September	Germany	2–0	Great Britain	Rotterdam, Netherlands
Euro Championship 5th	16:00 CEST	WP: Philipp Kleehaupt; Sv: Cesar Fabian Aquino Jung	Boxscore	LP: Chris Messer	Attendance: 443

=== 2026 ===
World Baseball Classic GS	6 March	Mexico	8–2	Great Britain	Houston, United States
World Baseball Classic GS	12:00 CST	WP: Robert Garcia; HR: Nacho Alvarez Jr., Jonathan Aranda	Boxscore	LP: Gary Gill Hill; HR: Harry Ford	Attendance: 29,724; Umpires: Roberto Ortiz

World Baseball Classic GS	7 March	Great Britain	1–9	United States	Houston, United States
World Baseball Classic GS	19:00 CST	LP: Andre Scrubb; HR: Nate Eaton	Boxscore	WP: Clay Holmes; HR: Kyle Schwarber	Attendance: 34,368; Umpires: Alex Tosi

World Baseball Classic GS	8 March	Great Britain	4–7	Italy	Houston, United States
World Baseball Classic GS	12:00 CDT	LP: Nick Wells	Boxscore	WP: Gabriele Quattrini; Sv: Greg Weissert; HR: Andrew Fischer, J.J. D'Orazio	Attendance: 35,141; Umpires: David Arrieta

World Baseball Classic GS	9 March	Brazil	1–8	Great Britain	Houston, United States
World Baseball Classic GS	12:00 CDT	LP: Tiago da Silva	Boxscore	WP: Gary Gill Hill; HR: Ian Lewis Jr.	Attendance: 34,395; Umpires: Brennan Miller

WBSC Premier12 Q	26 November	Nicaragua	v	Great Britain	Zhongshan, China
WBSC Premier12 Q	12:00 UTC+8

WBSC Premier12 Q	27 November	China	v	Great Britain	Zhongshan, China
WBSC Premier12 Q	18:30 UTC+8

WBSC Premier12 Q	28 November	Great Britain	v	Czech Republic	Zhongshan, China
WBSC Premier12 Q	12:00 UTC+8

== Tournament record ==
=== World Baseball Classic ===
World Baseball Classic record							Qualification record			
Year	Round	Position	W	L	RS	RA	W	L	RS	RA
2006	did not enter						No qualifiers held			
2009	did not enter						No qualifiers held			
2013	did not qualify						1	2	14	32
2017	did not qualify						2	2	21	17
(United States) 2023	Round 1	16th	1	3	18	31	3	0	31	13
(United States) 2026	Round 1	15th	1	3	15	25	Automatically qualified			
Total	Round 1	2/6	2	6	33	56	6	4	66	62

Great Britain World Baseball Classic Record by opponent
Opponent	Tournaments met	W-L record	Largest victory		Largest defeat		Current streak
Opponent	Tournaments met	W-L record	Score	Tournament	Score	Tournament	Current streak
Brazil	1	1-0	8–1	United States 2026	–		W1
Canada	1	0-1	–		18–8 (F/7)	United States 2023	L1
Colombia	1	1-0	7–5	United States 2023	–		W1
Italy	1	0-1	–		7–4	United States 2026	L1
Mexico	2	0-2	–		8–2	United States 2026	L2
United States	2	0-2	–		9–1	United States 2026	L2
Overall	2	2–6	Against BRA		Against CAN		W1
Overall	2	2–6	8–1	United States 2026	18–8 (F/7)	United States 2023	W1

Great Britain World Baseball Classic Qualifiers Record by opponent
Opponent	Tournaments met	W-L record	Largest victory		Largest defeat		Current streak
Opponent	Tournaments met	W-L record	Score	Tournament	Score	Tournament	Current streak
Brazil	1	1-0	4–3	United States 2017	–		W1
Canada	1	0-1	–		11–1 (F/7)	Germany 2013	L1
Czech Republic	1	1-0	12–5	Germany 2013	–		W1
France	1	1-0	14–4 (F/8)	Germany 2023	–		W1
Germany	2	1-1	8–1	Germany 2023	16–1 (F/7)	Germany 2013	W1
Israel	1	0-2	–		9–1	United States 2017	L2
Pakistan	1	1-0	14–0 (F/7)	United States 2017	–		W1
Spain	1	1-0	10–9 (F/10)	Germany 2023	–		W1
Overall	3	6–4	Against PAK		Against GER		W3
Overall	3	6–4	14–0 (F/7)	United States 2017	16–1 (F/7)	Germany 2013	W3

Great Britain was invited to compete in the qualifying round of the 2013 World Baseball Classic, where they were grouped Canada and Germany. After an 11–1 defeat to the Canadians, they won against the Czech Republic, 12–5. In the third group game, however, Great Britain lost to Germany. Being 16–0 down at the 7th inning stretch, they pulled one back before the mercy rule came into effect, and GB exited the qualifiers 16–1.

=== Baseball World Cup ===
Baseball World Cup record
Year	Host	Round	Position		W	L	RS	RA
1938	(United Kingdom)		1st place, gold medalist(s)	1 of 2	4	1	20	14
2009	(Croatia) (Netherlands)	2		15 of 22	1	9	23	70
Total	2/39	1 (gold)			5	10	43	84

1938 Amateur World Series

13 August	Great Britain	3–0	United States	United Kingdom Wavertree Stadium, Liverpool

15 August	Great Britain	8–6	United States	United Kingdom Kingston upon Hull

17 August	Great Britain	0–5	United States	United Kingdom Spotland Stadium, Rochdale

19 August	Great Britain	4–0	United States	United Kingdom The Shay, Halifax

20 August	Great Britain	5–3	United States	United Kingdom Leeds

2009 Baseball World Cup

10 September 2009; Round 1, Group C	Great Britain	7–9	Japan	Croatia Zagreb, Croatia; Attendance: 180
10 September 2009; Round 1, Group C	LP: Samuel Whitehead	Boxscore	WP: Yosuke Okamoto	Croatia Zagreb, Croatia; Attendance: 180

11 September 2009; Round 1, Group C	Nicaragua	10 – 0 (F/7)	Great Britain	Croatia Zagreb, Croatia; Attendance: 150
11 September 2009; Round 1, Group C	WP: S. Diego Garcia	Boxscore	LP: Alexander D. Smith	Croatia Zagreb, Croatia; Attendance: 150

12 September 2009; Round 1, Group C	Croatia	1–4	Great Britain	Croatia Zagreb, Croatia; Attendance: 600
12 September 2009; Round 1, Group C	LP: James Summers	Boxscore	WP: Brian C. Essery; Sv: Thomas A. Boleska	Croatia Zagreb, Croatia; Attendance: 600

13 September 2009; Round 2, Group F	Great Britain	0–6	Cuba	Netherlands Pim Mulier Stadion, Haarlem; Attendance: 327
13 September 2009; Round 2, Group F	LP: Stephen P. Spragg	Boxscore	WP: Freddy A. Alvarez	Netherlands Pim Mulier Stadion, Haarlem; Attendance: 327

14 September 2009; Round 2, Group F	Great Britain	5 – 15 (F/8)	South Korea	Netherlands Sportpark Ookmeer, Amsterdam; Attendance: 91
14 September 2009; Round 2, Group F	LP: Stephen P. Spragg	Boxscore	WP: Hyun-June Park	Netherlands Sportpark Ookmeer, Amsterdam; Attendance: 91

16 September 2009; Round 2, Group F	Nicaragua	4–1	Great Britain	Netherlands Familie Stadion, Rotterdam; Attendance: 112
16 September 2009; Round 2, Group F	WP: S. Diego Garcia	Boxscore	LP: Brian C. Essery	Netherlands Familie Stadion, Rotterdam; Attendance: 112

17 September 2009; 13:00; Round 2, Group F	Great Britain	4–5	Puerto Rico	Netherlands Pim Mulier Stadion, Haarlem; Attendance: 1,477
17 September 2009; 13:00; Round 2, Group F	LP: Alexander D. Smith	Boxscore	WP: Angel Garcia; Sv: Orlando B. Roman	Netherlands Pim Mulier Stadion, Haarlem; Attendance: 1,477

18 September 2009; Round 2, Group F	Netherlands	6–0	Great Britain	Netherlands Familie Stadion, Rotterdam; Attendance: 2,225
18 September 2009; Round 2, Group F	WP: Tom Stuifbergen	Boxscore	LP: Aeden McQueary-Ennis	Netherlands Familie Stadion, Rotterdam; Attendance: 2,225

19 September 2009; Round 2, Group F	Spain	3–10	Great Britain	Netherlands Familie Stadion, Rotterdam; Attendance: 433
19 September 2009; Round 2, Group F	WP: Rhiner A. Cruz	Boxscore	LP: Stephen P. Spragg	Netherlands Familie Stadion, Rotterdam; Attendance: 433

20 September 2009; Round 2, Group F	Great Britain	6–1	Venezuela	Netherlands Pim Mulier Stadion, Haarlem; Attendance: 800
20 September 2009; Round 2, Group F	LP: Thomas Stack-Babich	Boxscore	WP: Roger Luque	Netherlands Pim Mulier Stadion, Haarlem; Attendance: 800

=== European Baseball Championship ===
Team Great Britain have played in 17 tournaments, with a current unbroken streak going back to 1997. The best result a silver medal (1967, 2007, and 2023).

Notable among these appearances was 2019, with former MLB pitchers Barry Enright and Michael Roth playing for the team.

- 1967 : (silver) 2nd
- 1971 : 7th
- 1989 : 7th
- 1991 : 8th
- 1997 : 9th
- 1999 : 9th
- 2001 : 10th
- 2003 : 9th
- 2005 : 7th
- 2007 : (silver) 2nd

- 2010 : 8th
- 2012 : 11th
- 2014 : 9th
- 2016 : 9th
- 2019 : 9th
- 2021 : 6th
- 2023 : (silver) 2nd
- 2025 : 6th
- 2027 : Qualified
