= 2026 World Baseball Classic Pool B =

Pool B of the 2026 World Baseball Classic (branded as the World Baseball Classic 2026 Houston Capital One for sponsorship reasons) took place from March 6 to 11, 2026, at Daikin Park in Houston, Texas. The second of four pools, the top two teams automatically qualified for the top-eight knockout stage, beginning with quarterfinals in Houston and Miami, Florida.

The group consisted of the United States (co-host), Mexico, Italy, Great Britain, and Brazil. Italy exceeded expectations by going undefeated in pool play and securing the top spot in the quarterfinals. Following Italy's win against Mexico in the final game of the pool, the United States clinched the second place spot, despite fears of their elimination following their upset loss to Italy. Brazil was relegated after failing to win a game and must re-qualify for the next edition of the tournament.

== Teams ==
Draw position	Team	Pot	Confederation	Method of qualification	Date of qualification	Finals appearance	Last appearance	Previous best performance	WBSC Rankings
B1	United States	1	WBSC Americas	Hosts + 2023 participants	March 8, 2023	6th	2023	Champions (2017)	3
B2	Mexico	2	WBSC Americas	2023 participants	March 8, 2023	6th	2023	Third place (2023)	6
B3	Italy	3	WBSC Europe	2023 participants	March 8, 2023	6th	2023	Quarterfinals (2013, 2023)	14
B4	Great Britain	4	WBSC Europe	2023 participants	March 8, 2023	2nd	2023	Pool stage (2023)	19
B5	Brazil	5	WBSC Americas	Qualifiers Pool B runners-up	March 6, 2025	2nd	2013	Pool stage (2013)	22

== Standings ==
Pos	Team	Pld	W	L	RF	RA	PCT	GB	Qualification
1	Italy	4	4	0	32	11	1.000	—	Advance to knockout stage
2	United States (H)	4	3	1	35	17	.750	1	Advance to knockout stage
3	Mexico	4	2	2	28	16	.500	2	
4	Great Britain	4	1	3	15	25	.250	3	
5	Brazil	4	0	4	6	47	.000	4	Requalification required for next WBC

Source: MLB
(H) Hosts

== Summary ==
Date	Local time	Road team	Score	Home team	Inn.	Venue	Game duration	Attendance	Boxscore
Mar 6, 2026	12:00 CST	Mexico	8–2	Great Britain		Daikin Park	3:12	29,724	Boxscore
Mar 6, 2026	19:00 CST	United States	15–5	Brazil		Daikin Park	3:30	30,825	Boxscore
Mar 7, 2026	12:00 CST	Brazil	0–8	Italy		Daikin Park	2:47	29,357	Boxscore
Mar 7, 2026	19:00 CST	Great Britain	1–9	United States		Daikin Park	2:57	34,368	Boxscore
Mar 8, 2026	12:00 CDT	Great Britain	4–7	Italy		Daikin Park	3:06	35,141	Boxscore
Mar 8, 2026	19:00 CDT	Brazil	0–16	Mexico	6	Daikin Park	2:24	36,380	Boxscore
Mar 9, 2026	12:00 CDT	Brazil	1–8	Great Britain		Daikin Park	2:43	34,395	Boxscore
Mar 9, 2026	19:00 CDT	Mexico	3–5	United States		Daikin Park	3:04	41,628	Boxscore
Mar 10, 2026	20:00 CDT	Italy	8–6	United States		Daikin Park	3:08	38,653	Boxscore
Mar 11, 2026	18:00 CDT	Italy	9–1	Mexico		Daikin Park	3:09	39,894	Boxscore

== Games ==
=== Mexico vs. Great Britain ===
March 6, 2026 12:00 PM CST at Daikin Park in Houston, United States
Team	1	2	3	4	5	6	7	8	9	R	H	E
Mexico	0	1	0	0	0	0	0	3	4	8	6	0
Great Britain	0	0	0	0	0	1	0	0	1	2	8	0
WP: Robert Garcia (1−0) LP: Gary Gill Hill (0−1); Home runs: MEX: Nacho Alvarez Jr. (1), Jonathan Aranda (1); GBR: Harry Ford (1); Attendance: 29,724; Umpires: HP − Roberto Ortiz, 1B − Alex Tosi, 2B − Robert Nunez, 3B − Chun Il-soo; Boxscore

=== United States vs. Brazil ===
March 6, 2026 7:00 PM CST at Daikin Park in Houston, United States
Team	1	2	3	4	5	6	7	8	9	R	H	E
United States	2	0	1	0	4	0	0	1	7	15	10	1
Brazil	1	0	0	0	0	0	3	1	0	5	6	0
WP: Logan Webb (1−0) LP: Bo Takahashi (0−1); Home runs: USA: Aaron Judge (1); BRA: Lucas Ramirez 2 (2), Victor Mascai (1); Attendance: 30,825; Umpires: HP − Brennan Miller, 1B − Adrian Johnson, 2B − Cesar Quintana, 3B − Zdeněk Zidek; Boxscore

=== Brazil vs. Italy ===
March 7, 2026 12:00 PM CST at Daikin Park in Houston, United States
Team	1	2	3	4	5	6	7	8	9	R	H	E
Brazil	0	0	0	0	0	0	0	0	0	0	4	0
Italy	0	0	0	0	0	2	4	2	X	8	12	0
WP: Alek Jacob (1−0) LP: Hector Villarroel (0−1); Home runs: BRA: None; ITA: Dante Nori 2 (2), Dominic Canzone (1); Attendance: 29,357; Umpires: HP − Chun Il-soo, 1B − Roberto Ortiz, 2B − Brennan Miller, 3B − Zdeněk Zidek; Boxscore

=== Great Britain vs. United States ===
March 7, 2026 7:00 PM CST at Daikin Park in Houston, United States
Team	1	2	3	4	5	6	7	8	9	R	H	E
Great Britain	1	0	0	0	0	0	0	0	0	1	3	2
United States	0	0	0	0	5	3	1	0	x	9	12	1
WP: Clay Holmes (1−0) LP: Andre Scrubb (0−1); Home runs: GBR: Nate Eaton (1); USA: Kyle Schwarber (1); Attendance: 34,368; Umpires: HP − Alex Tosi, 1B − David Arrieta, 2B − Scott Barry, 3B − Robert Nunez; Boxscore

=== Great Britain vs. Italy ===
March 8, 2026 12:00 PM CDT at Daikin Park in Houston, United States
Team	1	2	3	4	5	6	7	8	9	R	H	E
Great Britain	2	0	0	0	0	0	0	2	0	4	7	2
Italy	0	0	2	3	2	0	0	0	X	7	12	0
WP: Gabriele Quattrini (1−0) LP: Nick Wells (0−1) Sv: Greg Weissert (1); Home runs: GBR: None; ITA: Andrew Fischer (1), J.J. D'Orazio (1); Attendance: 35,141; Umpires: HP − David Arrieta, 1B − Alex Tosi, 2B − Adrian Johnson, 3B − Zdeněk Zidek; Boxscore

=== Brazil vs. Mexico ===
March 8, 2026 7:00 PM CDT at Daikin Park in Houston, United States
Team	1	2	3	4	5	6	R	H	E
Brazil	0	0	0	0	0	0	0	3	0
Mexico	4	1	0	6	1	4	16	16	0
WP: Taijuan Walker (1−0) LP: Eric Pardinho (0−1); Home runs: BRA: None; MEX: Jarren Duran (1), Alejandro Kirk (1), Alek Thomas (1), Julián Ornelas (1); Attendance: 36,380; Umpires: HP − Scott Barry, 1B − Cesar Quintana, 2B − Brennan Miller, 3B − Robert Nunez; Boxscore

=== Brazil vs. Great Britain ===
March 9, 2026 12:00 PM CDT at Daikin Park in Houston, United States
Team	1	2	3	4	5	6	7	8	9	R	H	E
Brazil	0	0	0	0	1	0	0	0	0	1	1	1
Great Britain	0	0	0	0	3	1	2	2	x	8	8	0
WP: Gary Gill Hill (1–1) LP: Tiago Da Silva (0–1); Home runs: BRA: None; GBR: Ian Lewis Jr. (1); Attendance: 34,395; Umpires: HP − Brennan Miller, 1B − Zdeněk Zidek, 2B − Scott Barry, 3B − Cesar Quintana; Boxscore

=== Mexico vs. United States ===
March 9, 2026 7:00 PM CDT at Daikin Park in Houston, United States
Team	1	2	3	4	5	6	7	8	9	R	H	E
Mexico	0	0	0	0	0	2	0	1	0	3	7	0
United States	0	0	5	0	0	0	0	0	X	5	8	1
WP: Paul Skenes (1–0) LP: Jesus Cruz (0–1) Sv: Garrett Whitlock (1); Home runs: MEX: Jarren Duran 2 (3); USA: Aaron Judge (2), Roman Anthony (1); Attendance: 41,628; Umpires: HP − Adrian Johnson, 1B − Chun Il-soo, 2B − Roberto Ortiz, 3B − David Arrieta; Boxscore

=== Italy vs. United States ===
The game was described as one of the biggest upsets in World Baseball Classic history, and was widely described as a "stunner".

On MLB Network's Hot Stove podcast the morning prior to the game, Mark DeRosa stated that the United States "wanted to win this game even though our ticket's punched to the quarter-finals". This statement turned out to be untrue, and DeRosa then said he knew USA didn't clinch a quarter-final berth and was informed on March 10 when arriving to the ballpark.

After the loss to Italy, fans questioned DeRosa's managing of the roster, and wanted him to step down even if he wanted to manage USA for the next WBC.

March 10, 2026 8:00 PM CDT at Daikin Park in Houston, United States
Team	1	2	3	4	5	6	7	8	9	R	H	E
Italy	0	3	0	2	0	3	0	0	0	8	6	0
United States	0	0	0	0	0	1	3	1	1	6	11	2
WP: Michael Lorenzen (1–0) LP: Nolan McLean (0–1) Sv: Greg Weissert (2); Home runs: ITA: Sam Antonacci (1), Jac Caglianone (1), Kyle Teel (1); USA: Pete Crow-Armstrong 2 (2), Gunnar Henderson (1); Attendance: 38,653; Umpires: HP – Roberto Ortiz, 1B – Scott Barry, 2B – Robert Nunez, 3B – Cesar Quintana; Boxscore

=== Italy vs. Mexico ===
March 11, 2026 6:00 PM CDT at Daikin Park in Houston, United States
Team	1	2	3	4	5	6	7	8	9	R	H	E
Italy	0	1	0	1	3	1	1	2	0	9	10	0
Mexico	0	0	0	0	0	0	1	0	0	1	5	1
WP: Aaron Nola (1–0) LP: Javier Assad (0–1); Home runs: ITA: Vinnie Pasquantino 3 (3), Jon Berti (1); MEX: None; Attendance: 39,894; Umpires: HP – Alex Tosi, 1B – Adrian Johnson, 2B – David Arrieta, 3B – Chun Il Soo; Boxscore

== Statistics ==
=== Batting ===
Team	AB	R	H	2B	3B	HR	BB	AVG	OBP	SLG	OPS
Italy	136	32	40	9	1	12	21	.294	.398	.640	1.038
United States	140	35	41	10	0	7	32	.293	.430	.514	.944
Mexico	127	28	34	6	0	8	17	.268	.380	.504	.884
Great Britain	127	15	26	4	0	3	19	.205	.308	.307	.615
Brazil	106	6	14	1	0	3	10	.130	.217	.222	.439

=== Pitching ===
Team	ERA	IP	H	R	ER	HR	K	BB	WHIP
United States	3.50	36	22	17	14	9	57	6	0.778
Italy	2.75	36	27	11	11	3	45	15	1.167
Great Britain	5.29	34	31	25	20	5	31	20	1.500
Mexico	4.22	32	29	16	15	7	34	20	1.531
Brazil	13.50	30.2	46	47	46	9	17	38	2.739
