= Brennan Miller =

American baseball umpire (born 1991)

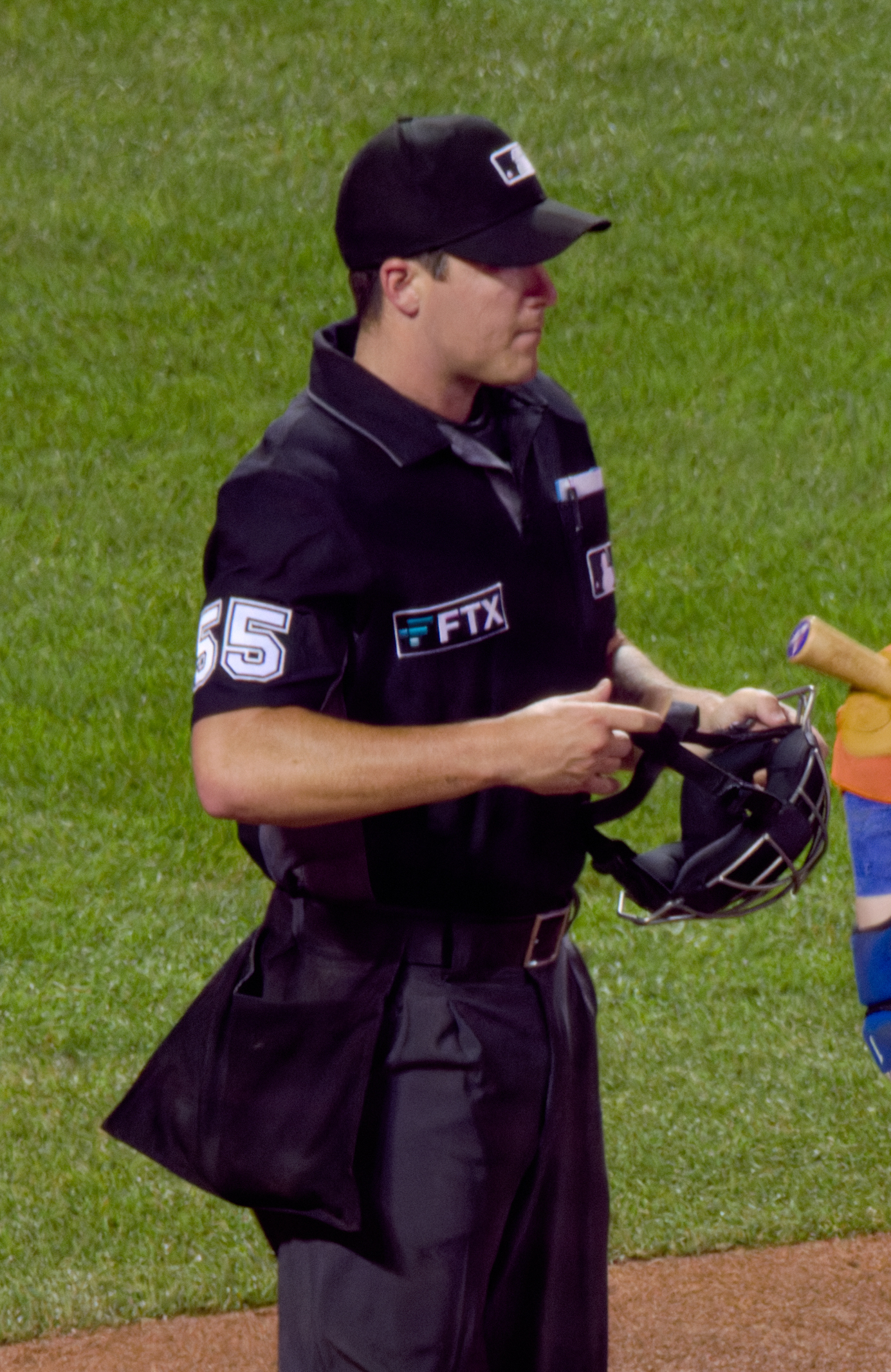
- Miller in 2022

MLB – No. 55
- Umpire
- Born: July 1991 (age 35); Alexandria, Virginia, U.S.

MLB debut
- April 20, 2019

Crew information
- Umpiring crew: F
- Crew members: #98 Chris Conroy (crew chief); #74 John Tumpane; #97 Ben May; #55 Brennan Miller

Career highlights and awards
- Special assignments: Division Series (2026); Wild Card Games/Series (2024); World Baseball Classic (2026)

Brennan Miller (born July 1991) is an American professional baseball umpire who began his Major League Baseball career in 2019 and joined the permanent staff in 2023. He wears uniform number 55.

== Umpiring career ==
After graduating from the MiLB Umpire Academy in 2013, Miller began working as an umpire in Minor League Baseball. He umpired in the New York-Penn League, Florida Instructional League, Florida State League, Arizona Instructional League, Southern League, and the International League. Miller umpired is first game in Major League Baseball in 2019. As a call-up umpire in 2019, Miller was involved in a profanity-laced argument with New York Yankees manager Aaron Boone. Following a called third strike to Brett Gardner and strike one call to DJ LeMahieu, Miller ejected Boone for continuing to argue after he warned him. MLB would later suspend Boone for one game for making contact with Miller during the tirade.

MLB promoted him to the permanent staff in 2023 after a record-high ten MLB umpires retired following the 2022 season.

In 2024, Miller received his first career on-field postseason assignment, when he worked the 2024 National League Wild Card Series between the Milwaukee Brewers and New York Mets.

in 2026, Miller was selected to work Pool B games of the 2026 World Baseball Classic, appearing in 5 games over the course of pool play.

== See also ==
- List of Major League Baseball umpires (disambiguation)
