= Cory Blaser =

American baseball umpire (born 1981)

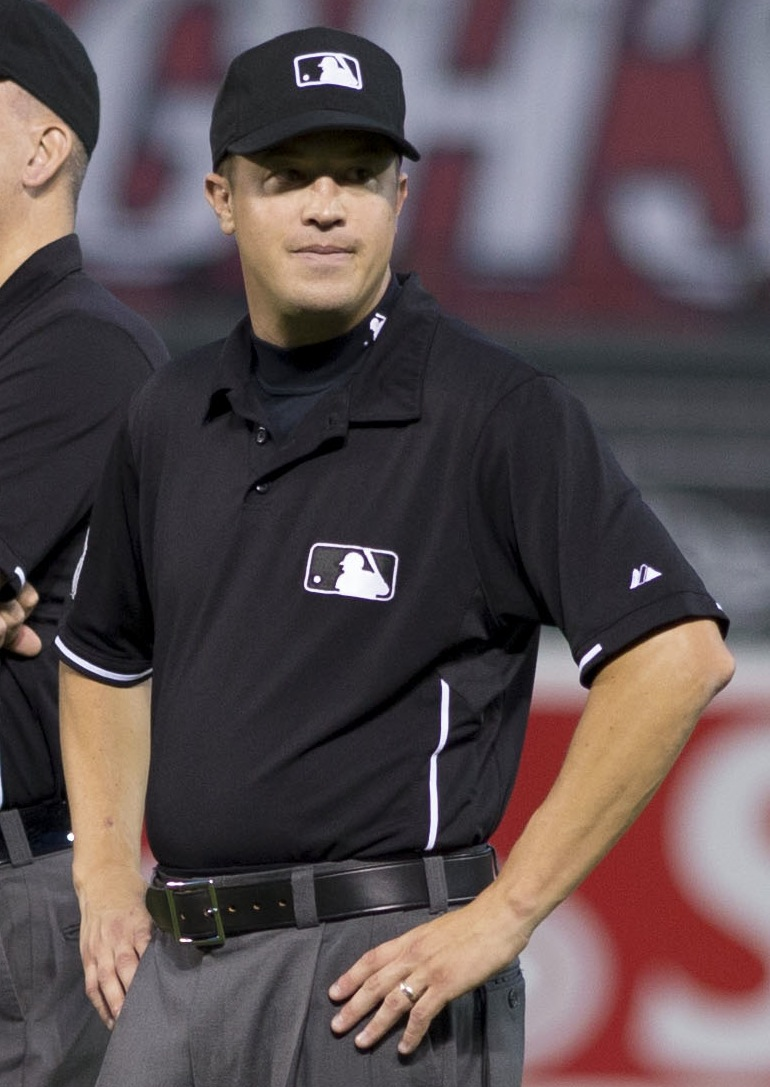
- Blaser in 2013

MLB – No. 89
- Umpire
- Born: December 8, 1981 (age 44); Denver, Colorado, U.S.

MLB debut
- April 24, 2010

Crew information
- Umpiring crew: H
- Crew members: #49 Andy Fletcher (crew chief); #89 Cory Blaser; #52 Jansen Visconti; #66 Alex Tosi

Career highlights and awards
- Special assignments: League Championship Series (2019, 2020); Division Series (2016, 2017, 2018, 2022, 2023, 2024, 2026); Wild Card Games/Series (2015, 2019, 2020, 2025); All-Star Games (2018); World Baseball Classic (2017, 2023); MLB Little League Classic (2024)

Cory Steven Blaser (born December 8, 1981) is an American Major League Baseball umpire. He umpired his first major league game on April 24, 2010.

== Umpiring career ==
Blaser is a graduate of Pomona High School and attended Colorado State University. He had previously worked in the Arizona League Northwest League, Midwest League Carolina League Eastern League Florida Instructional League, and Arizona Instructional League. Blaser attended the Harry Wendelstedt Umpire School, and works as an instructor there in the off-season.

Blaser was officially named to the full-time MLB staff prior to the 2014 season. His uniform number is 89.

Blaser worked his first career MLB postseason game in right field on October 7, 2015, serving in the 2015 National League Wild Card Game between the Chicago Cubs and the Pittsburgh Pirates.

=== Controversy ===
Blaser is one of the officials selected for the 2026 World Baseball Classic. On March 15, 2026, Blaser was the home plate umpire for the semifinal match between the Dominican Republic and the USA. At the bottom of the 9th inning with two strikes, three balls, and two outs, Blaser incorrectly called the US pitcher's pitch a strike even though the ball did not go through the strike zone. The Dominican Republic lost the match in consequence.

== See also ==
- List of Major League Baseball umpires (disambiguation)
