= Chris Conroy =

American baseball umpire (born 1974)

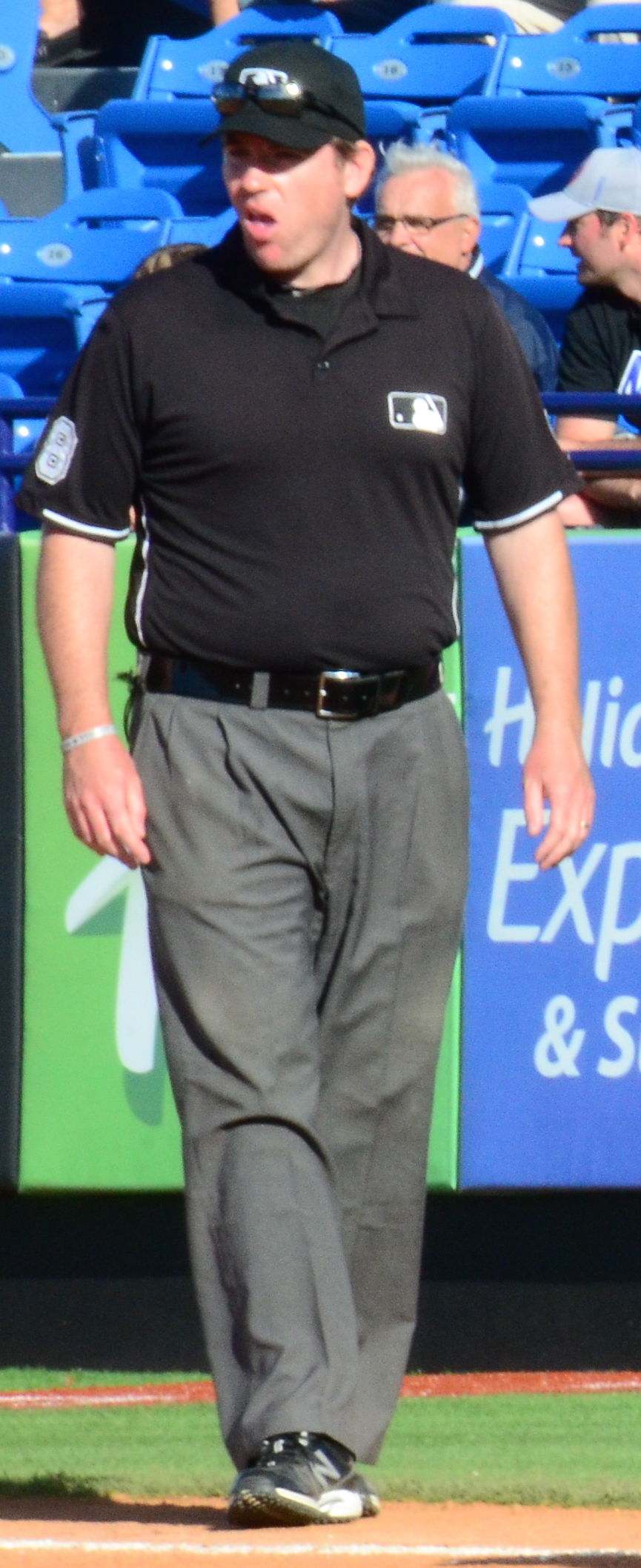
- Conroy in 2014

MLB – No. 98
- Umpire
- Born: July 22, 1974 (age 51); North Adams, Massachusetts, U.S.

MLB debut
- September 29, 2010

Crew information
- Umpiring crew: F
- Crew members: #98 Chris Conroy (crew chief); #74 John Tumpane; #97 Ben May; #55 Brennan Miller

Career highlights and awards
- Special Assignments: Major League Baseball Japan All-Star Series (2014); Wild Card Games/Series (2015, 2020, 2022); All-Star Games (2017, 2026); Division Series (2018, 2021, 2025); League Championship Series (2019, 2020, 2022); World Series (2021)

Christopher Patrick Conroy (born July 22, 1974) is an American Major League Baseball (MLB) umpire. He made his MLB debut on September 29, 2010. His uniform number is 98. Conroy was officially added to the full-time staff of MLB umpires on June 14, 2013, replacing Brian Runge. He was promoted to crew chief in 2023.

== Career ==
Conroy was the first base umpire on August 24, 2012, when Adrián Beltré of the Texas Rangers hit for the cycle against the Minnesota Twins.

He was the first base umpire on September 28, 2012, when Homer Bailey of the Cincinnati Reds no-hit the Pittsburgh Pirates.

Conroy served as one of three MLB umpire representatives for the November 2014 MLB Japan All-Star Series.

== See also ==
- List of Major League Baseball umpires (disambiguation)
