= Ben May (umpire) =

American baseball umpire (born 1982)

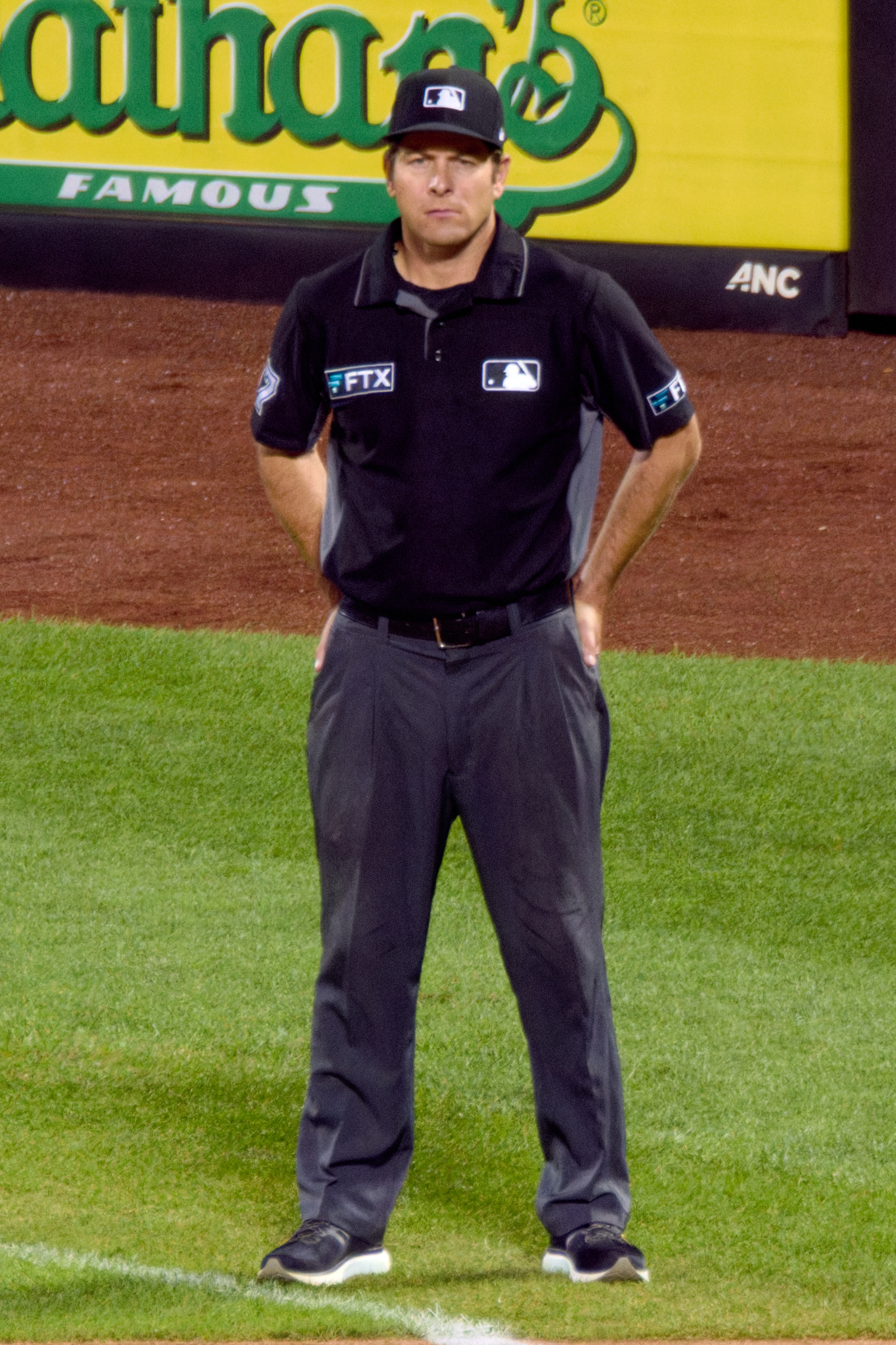
- May at Citi Field in 2022

MLB – No. 97
- Umpire
- Born: January 23, 1982 (age 44); Racine, Wisconsin, U.S.

MLB debut
- April 17, 2014

Crew information
- Umpiring crew: F
- Crew members: #98 Chris Conroy (crew chief); #74 John Tumpane; #97 Ben May; #55 Brennan Miller

Career highlights and awards
- Special assignments: League Championship Series (2025); Division Series (2023, 2026); Wild Card Games/Series (2022, 2024, 2025); All-Star Games (2024); World Baseball Classic (2023)

Benjamin Joseph May (born January 23, 1982) is an American umpire in Major League Baseball (MLB). He has worked in MLB since 2014, and wears number 97.

== Early life ==
A native of Racine, Wisconsin, May comes from an athletic family and graduated from St. Catherine's High School in 2000 and from Marquette University in 2005. He has a twin brother, Bill, who works and lives in Milwaukee, WI.

== Career ==
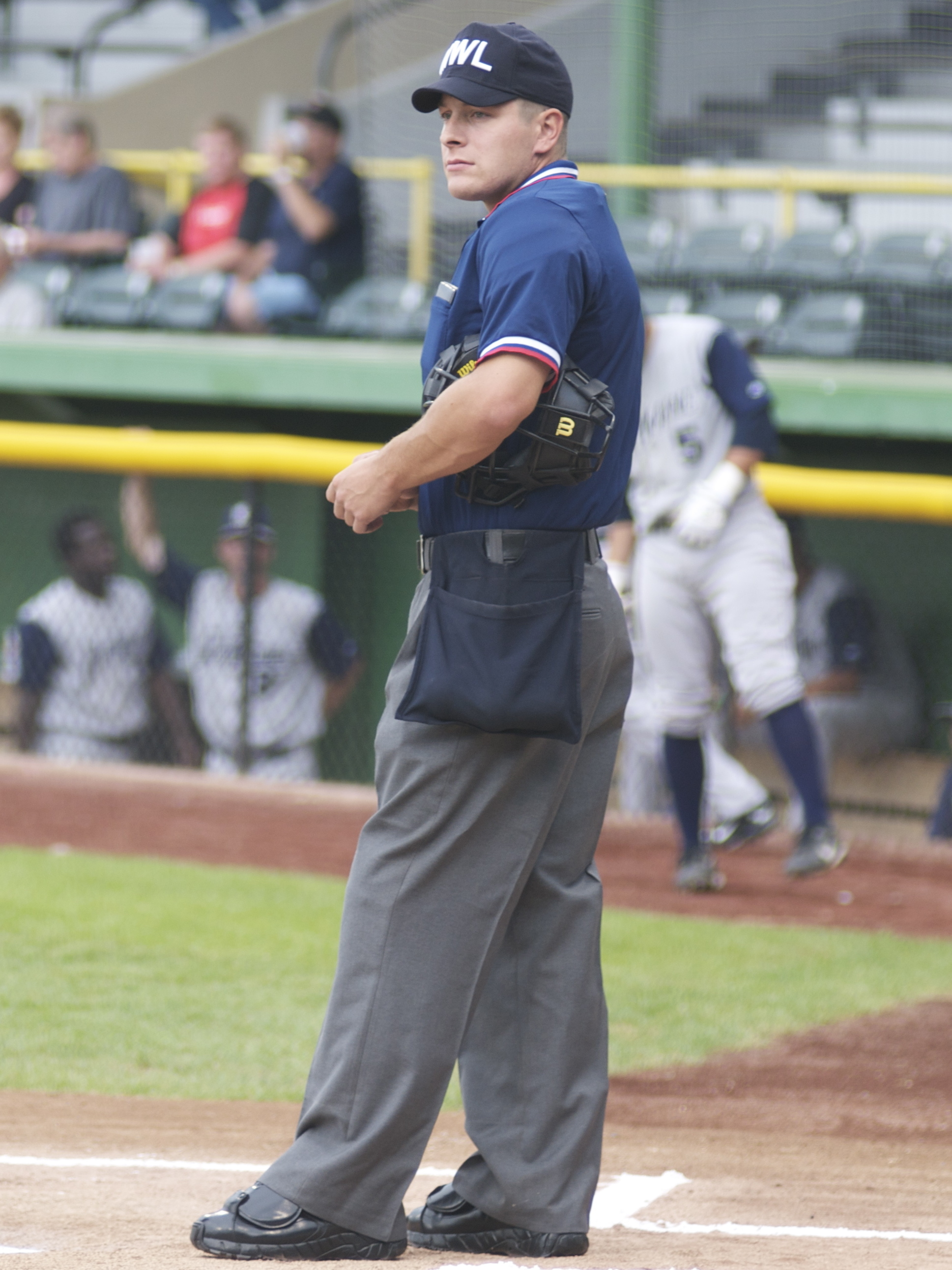
May in the Midwest League in 2008

May umpired his first MLB games on April 14, 2014, working both games in a doubleheader between the Toronto Blue Jays and Minnesota Twins. He worked a total of 187 games during his first three MLB seasons, and issued five ejections. In 2015, according to an investigation by the Denver Post, May had the highest percentage of challenged calls overturned (12 out of 13) in MLB. By the 2018 regular season he was found to be a top-ten performing home plate umpire in terms of accuracy in calling balls and strikes, based on a study conducted at Boston University where over 350,000 pitches were culled and analyzed. In 2022, he was again rated as one of MLB's best umpires behind the plate, ranking in the 97th percentile for consistency and 70th percentile for accuracy.

May was an umpire for the 2011 All-Star Futures Game, and qualifying rounds of the 2013 World Baseball Classic.

In January 2022, May was promoted to be a full-time MLB umpire. He was tabbed to be one of six umpires at the 2024 Major League Baseball All-Star Game, four of whom would be making their MLB All-Star Game debut.

May was featured on the cover of the Virtual Umpire Camp DVD.

== See also ==
- List of Major League Baseball umpires (disambiguation)
