= 2026 National League Division Series =

Teams
Team (Wins)		Manager	Season
Milwaukee Brewers (3)		Pat Murphy	103–59 (.636), GA: 14
San Diego Padres (1)		Craig Stammen	91–71 (.562), GB: 9
- Dates: October 3–7
- Television: FS1
- TV announcers: Adam Amin, A. J. Pierzynski, Adam Wainwright, and Tom Verducci
- Radio: ESPN
- Radio announcers: Jon Sciambi and Doug Glanville
- Umpires: Lance Barrett, Nic Lentz, Nick Mahrley, Alfonso Márquez (crew chief), Brennan Miller, Quinn Wolcott

Teams
Team (Wins)		Manager	Season
Los Angeles Dodgers (3)		Dave Roberts	100–62 (.617), GA: 9
Atlanta Braves (1)		Walt Weiss	94–68 (.580), GA: 6
- Dates: October 3–7
- Television: Fox (Game 1); FS1 (Games 2–4)
- TV announcers: Joe Davis (Games 1–2), Kenny Albert (Game 3), Brandon Gaudin (Game 4), John Smoltz, and Ken Rosenthal
- Radio: ESPN
- Radio announcers: Dave O'Brien and Jessica Mendoza
- Umpires: Mike Estabrook, Tripp Gibson, Chris Guccione, James Hoye (crew chief), Roberto Ortiz, Jim Wolf
- NLWC: San Diego Padres over Chicago Cubs (2–0); Atlanta Braves over Philadelphia Phillies (2–1)

The 2026 National League Division Series (NLDS) were the two best-of-five playoff series in Major League Baseball's (MLB) 2026 postseason to determine the participating teams of the 2026 National League Championship Series (NLCS). These matchups were:

- (1) Milwaukee Brewers (NL Central champions) vs. (4) San Diego Padres (Wild Card Series winner): Brewers won the series, 3–1.
- (2) Los Angeles Dodgers (NL West champions) vs. (3) Atlanta Braves (Wild Card Series winner): Dodgers won the series, 3–1.

The team with the better regular season record (higher seed) of each series hosted Games 1, 2, and (if necessary) 5, while the lower-seeded team hosted Game 3 and (if necessary) 4.

This was the first year all of the higher seeds won their Division Series match-up in the Wild Card Series era (2020, 2022–present).

== Background ==
The top two division winners (first two seeds) are determined by regular season winning percentages. The final two teams are the winner of the National League Wild Card Series, played between the league's third to sixth-seeded teams.

The Milwaukee Brewers (103–59) clinched their eighth postseason berth in the last nine seasons (2018–2021; 2023–2026) on September 11 with a 20–0 shutout against the Cincinnati Reds, just two runs short of their franchise record they tied earlier in the season against the Seattle Mariners on August 18th in a 22–0 win. They won their fourth consecutive National League Central on September 15, a first-round bye on September 22 after an Atlanta Braves' loss, and best overall record in both NL and MLB after they beat the Philadelphia Phillies and Dodgers lost to Padres on September 24, giving them home-field advantage throughout the entire playoffs. The San Diego Padres (91–71) qualified for the postseason as the fourth seed wild card entrant on September 24; they swept the Chicago Cubs in the Wild Card Series. This division series marked the first postseason meeting between the Brewers and the Padres. San Diego won the regular season series, 4–2, against Milwaukee. Both the Brewers and Padres came into the league together in 1969 and both share the distinction of not yet winning a World Series. As such, this is the first postseason series since the 2016 World Series where both teams have a 50 year or more title drought.

The two-time defending champion Los Angeles Dodgers (100–62) clinched their 14th consecutive postseason berth on September 14, a feat that tied the Atlanta Braves (1991–2005, excluding 1994 when the postseason was canceled due to a strike) for most consecutive postseason appearances. They won their fifth straight National League West and 13th in last 14 on September 17 by beating the Cincinnati Reds 8–2 and clinched a first-round bye when the same Reds team defeated the Braves a week later on September 24. The Atlanta Braves (94–68) qualified for the postseason as the National League East division winner and the league's third seed on September 20; they defeated the Philadelphia Phillies in the Wild Card Series in three games. This division series marked the sixth postseason meeting, and fourth in the last nine years, between the Dodgers and the Braves, who were NL West divisional rivals from 1969–1993. Atlanta won the regular-season series, 5–1, against Los Angeles.

== Matchups ==
=== Milwaukee Brewers vs. San Diego Padres ===
Milwaukee won the series, 3–1.

Game	Date	Score	Location	Time	Attendance
1	October 3	San Diego Padres – 2, Milwaukee Brewers – 3	American Family Field	3:28	42,843
2	October 4	San Diego Padres – 3, Milwaukee Brewers – 4	American Family Field	3:14	41,683
3	October 6	Milwaukee Brewers – 3, San Diego Padres – 4	Petco Park	3:22	47,708
4	October 7	Milwaukee Brewers – 3, San Diego Padres – 1	Petco Park	3:00	47,712

=== Los Angeles Dodgers vs. Atlanta Braves ===
Los Angeles won the series, 3–1.

Game	Date	Score	Location	Time	Attendance
1	October 3	Atlanta Braves – 3, Los Angeles Dodgers – 5	Dodger Stadium	2:44	50,194
2	October 4	Atlanta Braves – 3, Los Angeles Dodgers – 2	Dodger Stadium	3:18	50,729
3	October 6	Los Angeles Dodgers – 3, Atlanta Braves – 1	Truist Park	2:56	42,420
4	October 7	Los Angeles Dodgers – 4, Atlanta Braves – 1	Truist Park	2:54	41,173

== Milwaukee vs. San Diego ==
This is the first postseason matchup between the Milwaukee Brewers and the San Diego Padres.

=== Game 1 ===
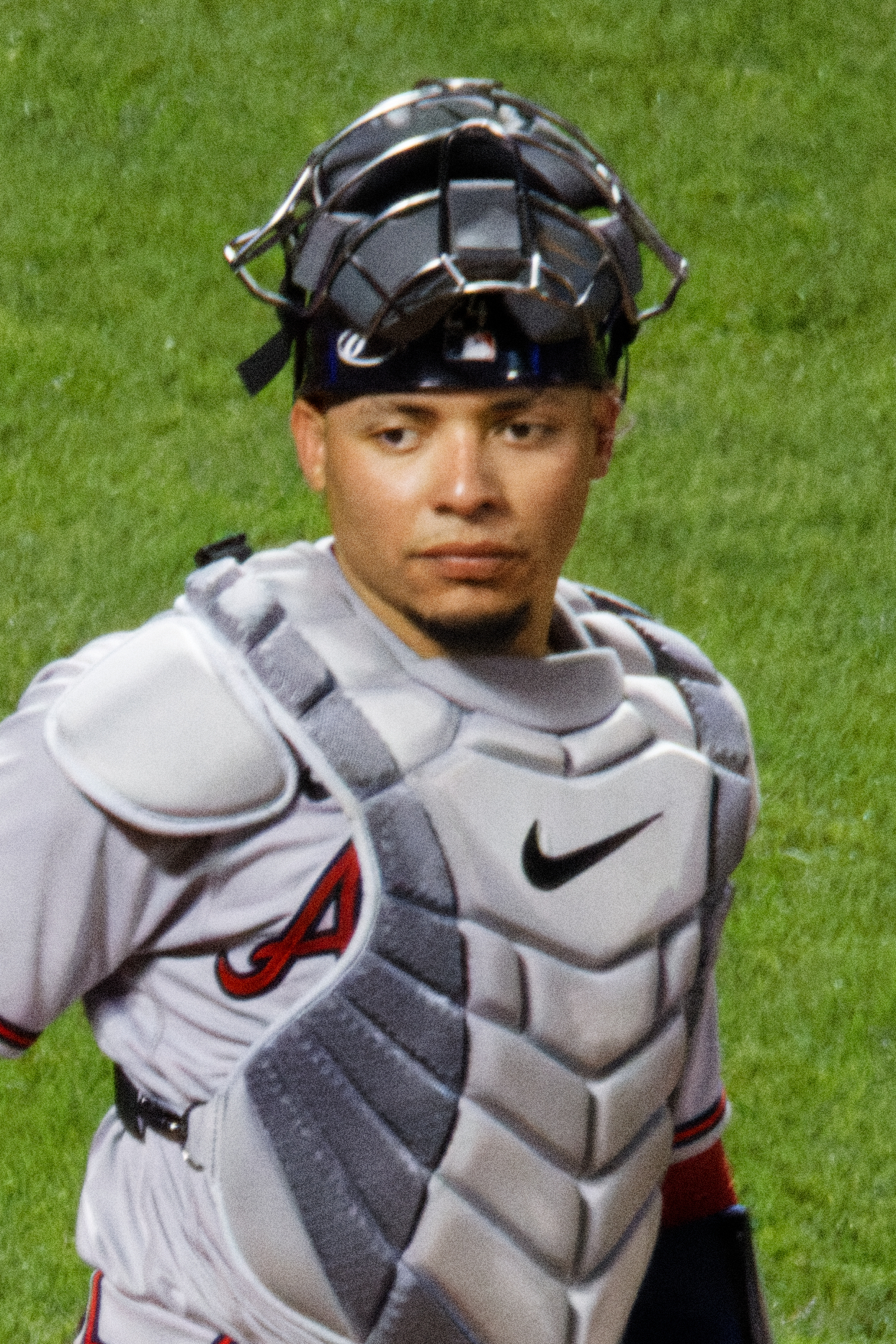
William Contreras' home run in the 7th inning was the difference in the 3–2 Brewers victory.

October 3, 2026 7:38 pm (CDT) at American Family Field in Milwaukee, Wisconsin 68 °F (20 °C), Roof Closed
Team	1	2	3	4	5	6	7	8	9	R	H	E
San Diego	0	2	0	0	0	0	0	0	0	2	9	1
Milwaukee	0	0	2	0	0	0	1	0	X	3	7	0
WP: DL Hall (1–0) LP: Adrián Morejón (0–1) Sv: Trevor Megill (1); Home runs: SD: None; MIL: Jackson Chourio (1), William Contreras (1); Attendance: 42,843; Boxscore

In the top of the second inning, Luis Campusano hit an RBI single off Jacob Misiorowski to drive in Xander Bogaerts, putting the Padres on the board 1–0. Then, Jake Cronenworth drove in Ethan Salas on a fielder's choice to extend the Padres' lead to 2–0. In the bottom of the third inning, Jackson Chourio hit a two-run home run off Robbie Ray to tie the game at 2–2. Afterward, Bradgley Rodriguez escaped a one-out, bases-loaded jam to maintain the 2–2 tie. In the top of the seventh inning, DL Hall got Jackson Merrill to fly out to escape another two-out, bases-loaded jam, keeping it deadlocked at 2–2. In the bottom of the seventh, William Contreras hit a solo home run off Adrian Morejon to put the Brewers ahead 3–2. In the ninth inning, a fly ball from Ty France that looked like a potential go-ahead home run struck the roof and was caught by Chourio on its way back down for an out. Brewers closer Trevor Megill then retired Merrill on a lineout to secure the Game 1 victory for Milwaukee.

Statcast data showed that France’s ninth-inning batted ball had a 105-mile-per-hour (169 km/h) exit velocity and a 49-degree launch angle. Historically, batted balls with those metrics had never resulted in a home run, meaning the steep angle likely would have resulted in an out regardless of the roof. Observers on social media joked that the roof acted as an angel for the Brewers, with Brewers manager Pat Murphy sarcastically thanking late longtime announcer Bob Uecker after the game.

=== Game 2 ===
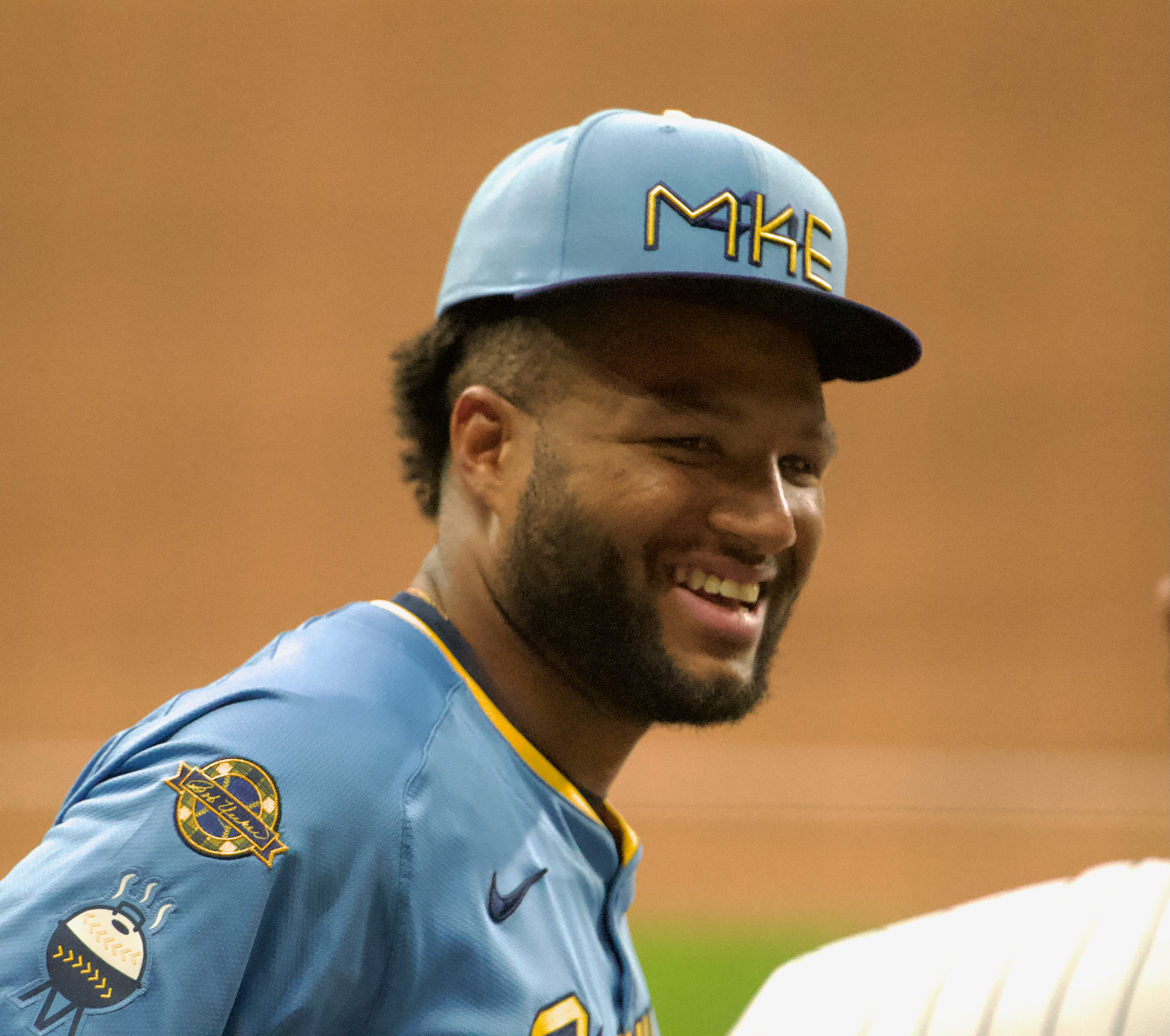
Jackson Chourio's two-out two RBI single gave Milwaukee the walk off 4–3 win and 2–0 series lead for the Brewers.

October 4, 2026 3:08 pm (CDT) at American Family Field in Milwaukee, Wisconsin 67 °F (19 °C), Roof Open; Clear
Team	1	2	3	4	5	6	7	8	9	R	H	E
San Diego	1	0	0	0	1	0	1	0	0	3	5	2
Milwaukee	0	0	0	0	1	0	1	0	2	4	5	3
WP: Trevor Megill (1–0) LP: Mason Miller (0–1); Attendance: 41,683; Boxscore

In the top of the first inning, Ty France opened the scoring with an RBI single, driving in Manny Machado for a 1–0 Padres lead. San Diego added to their lead following an error by Brewers shortstop Brice Turang, which allowed Luis Campusano to reach third base and later score on an RBI fielder's choice by Dustin Harris, extending the advantage to 2–0.

Milwaukee cut the deficit to 2–1 in the bottom of the fifth inning when Christian Yelich scored on an RBI single by Sal Frelick. Brewers starter Logan Henderson pitched five innings, giving up two hits, two runs (one earned), three walks, and four strikeouts.

Padres starter Michael King exited after five innings, allowing three hits and one run while striking out six batters. San Diego pushed their lead to 3–1 in the top of the seventh inning when Fernando Tatís Jr. scored on another RBI single by Ty France. Garrett Mitchell scored for the Brewers in the bottom of the seventh on a throwing error by Jake Cronenworth.

In the bottom of the ninth, following walks to Yelich, Frelick, and Gary Sánchez, Jackson Chourio hit a walk-off, two-run single off Padres closer Mason Miller, giving the Brewers a 4–3 win and a 2–0 series lead heading to San Diego. Miller had thrown 12 pitches in the eight inning, striking out two, and retired the first batter in the ninth on two pitches before loading the bases on three walks, his first career postseason walks. It would have been his third six-out appearance of the season and his first six-out save since 2024. He threw a season-high 40 pitches, his most since 2023.

=== Game 3 ===
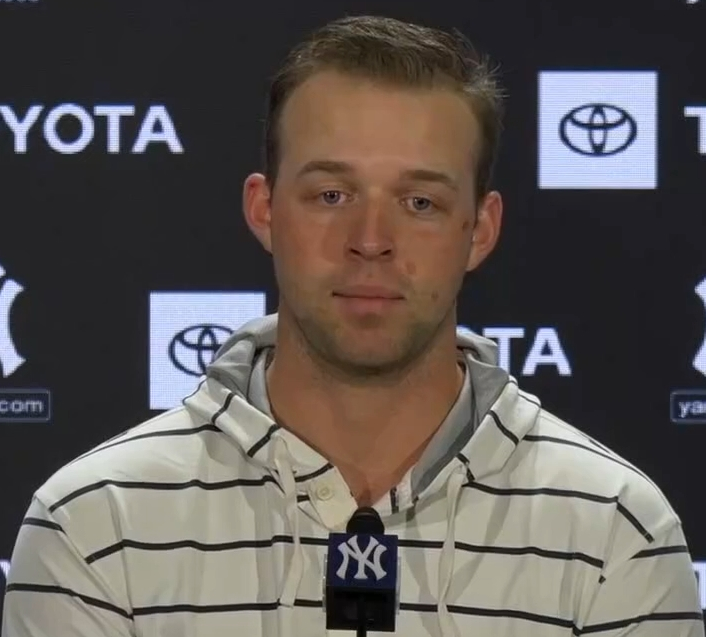
Michael King got the save for the Padres as they cut the series deficit to 2-1.

October 6, 2026 6:38 pm (PDT) at Petco Park in San Diego, California 81 °F (27 °C), Clear
Team	1	2	3	4	5	6	7	8	9	R	H	E
Milwaukee	0	0	0	1	1	0	1	0	0	3	11	1
San Diego	0	0	2	0	1	1	0	0	X	4	6	0
WP: Yuki Matsui (1–0) LP: JoJo Romero (0–1) Sv: Michael King (1); Home runs: MIL: William Contreras (2); SD: Jake Cronenworth (1); Attendance: 47,708; Boxscore

Less than an hour before first pitch, Mason Miller was placed on the paternity list after his wife went into labor earlier in the afternoon. Reliever Wandy Peralta was activated to the Padres roster as a temporary replacement for Miller.

In the bottom of the third inning, Fernando Tatís Jr. drove in the Padres' first run with an RBI groundout, scoring Samad Taylor. Manny Machado followed two batters later with an RBI single to score Jackson Merrill, giving San Diego a 2–0 lead. Milwaukee cut into the lead in the top of the fourth inning when William Contreras hit a solo home run off Nick Pivetta. The Brewers then tied the game in the top of the fifth inning when Jackson Chourio hit a sacrifice fly off Jason Adam to score Cooper Pratt.

San Diego regained the lead in the bottom of the fifth inning when Jake Cronenworth hit a solo home run off JoJo Romero, putting the Padres ahead 3–2. The Padres extended their lead to 4–2 in the bottom of the sixth inning when Xander Bogaerts scored on a throwing error by Pratt. The Brewers cut their deficit to 4–3 in the top of the seventh inning when Christian Yelich hit an RBI single, ending his 19-game postseason streak without an RBI, dating back to 2018.

San Diego turned to Michael King to start the eighth inning in relief, two days after he threw 72 pitches in Game 2 of the series. After recording four outs, King issued back-to-back walks to Contreras and Brice Turang in the top of the ninth. King then induced Yelich to ground into a game-ending double play, earning the save.

The 4–3 victory kept San Diego alive in the series, cutting Milwaukee's series lead to 2–1 and forcing a Game 4. The loss also extended the Brewers' postseason road losing streak to 12, matching an Major League Baseball record set by the Washington Senators / Minnesota Twins franchise from 1925 to 1987.

The attendance of 47,708 was the third-largest in Petco Park history.

=== Game 4 ===
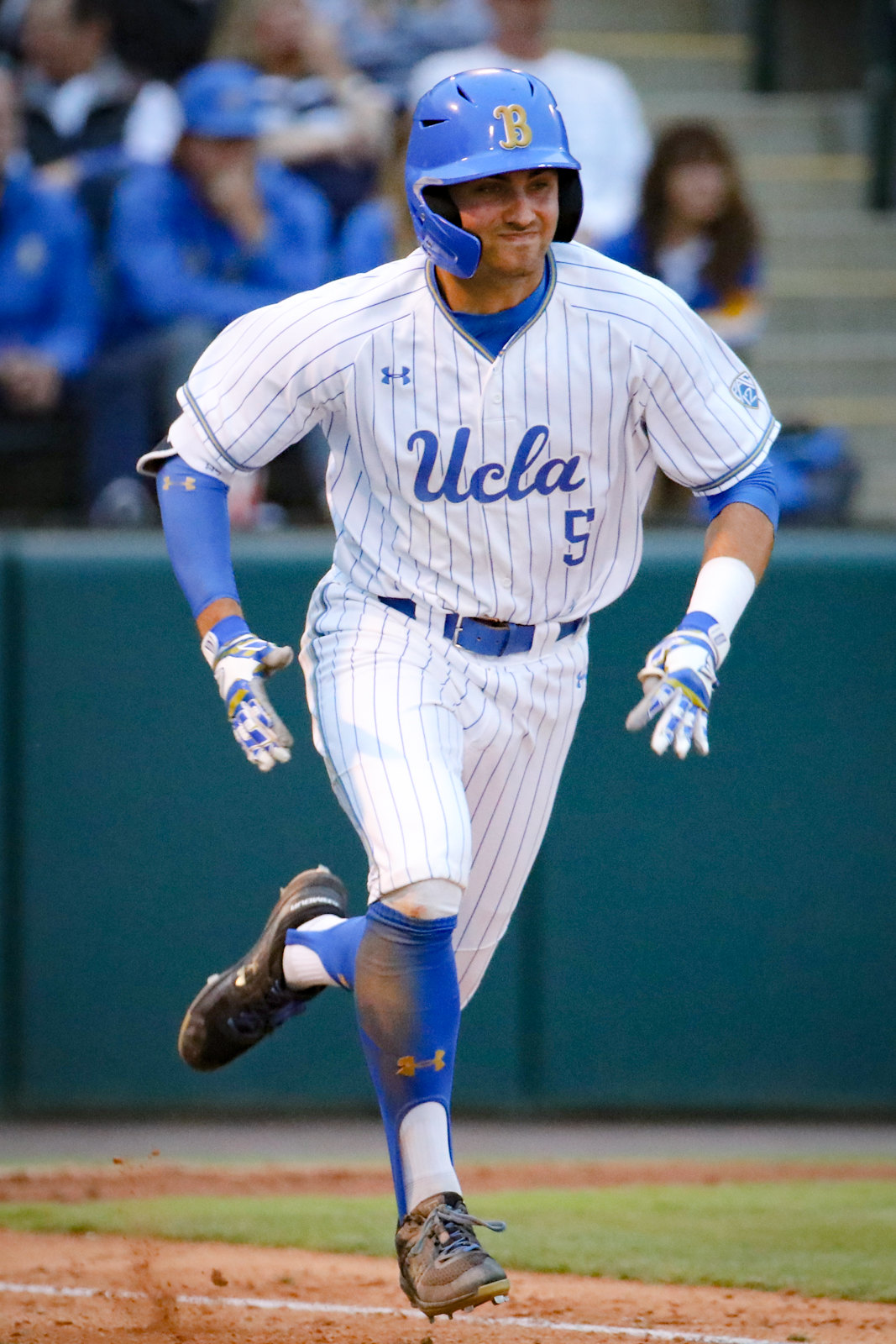
Garrett Mitchell made a game-saving catch off the bat of Manny Machado in the 8th inning.

October 7, 2026 7:00 pm (PDT) at Petco Park in San Diego, California 81 °F (27 °C), Clear
Team	1	2	3	4	5	6	7	8	9	R	H	E
Milwaukee	0	0	1	0	1	1	0	0	0	3	10	1
San Diego	0	0	1	0	0	0	0	0	0	1	3	0
WP: Aaron Ashby (1–0) LP: Robbie Ray (0–1) Sv: Trevor Megill (2); Home runs: MIL: None; SD: Fernando Tatís Jr. (1); Attendance: 47,712; Boxscore

Padres closer Mason Miller was activated from the paternity list before the game.

The Brewers scored the first run of the game when Garrett Mitchell's RBI single scored Sal Frelick. In the bottom of the third inning, Fernando Tatis Jr. hit a solo home run to tie the game at one. In the top of the fifth inning, Jackson Chourio singled, scoring Mitchell to reclaim the lead at 2–1. In the top of the sixth inning, Frelick hit a sacrifice fly, scoring Jake Bauers to extend the Brewers' lead to 3–1. In the bottom of the eighth inning, center fielder Garrett Mitchell robbed Manny Machado of potentially a game-tying two-run home run. The play, as described by FOX Sports play-by-play announcer A. J. Pierzynski, was a mirror image of Adam Jones' leaping catch off the bat of Machado in the 2017 World Baseball Classic, which was also played at Petco Park. With the score still 3–1, Trevor Megill closed out the ninth as the Brewers advanced to the NLCS.

The Padres went 0-for-21 at the plate to end their season, echoing their 24 scoreless inning streak to end their season in 2024. The win snapped the Brewers' 12-game road postseason losing streak. The series also became only the second postseason series in MLB history where no team led by more than two runs at any point during the series, joining the 1915 World Series.

=== Composite line score ===
2026 NLDS (3–1): Milwaukee Brewers beat San Diego Padres

Team	1	2	3	4	5	6	7	8	9	R	H	E
San Diego Padres	1	2	3	0	2	1	1	0	0	10	23	3
Milwaukee Brewers	0	0	3	1	3	1	3	0	2	13	33	5
Total attendance: 179,946 Average attendance: 44,987

== Los Angeles vs. Atlanta ==
This was the sixth postseason matchup between the Los Angeles Dodgers and Atlanta Braves, tying Cincinnati–Pittsburgh, Los Angeles–St. Louis and Los Angeles–Philadelphia for most frequent playoff meetings in the National League. Atlanta won the first meeting in the 1996 NLDS. Los Angeles won the next three matchups in the 2013 NLDS, 2018 NLDS, and 2020 NLCS. Atlanta won the most recent postseason series in the 2021 NLCS. The two teams also met in the 1959 National League tie-breaker series, considered regular season games, with the Dodgers winning that series, two games to none, to advance to the 1959 World Series. The Braves and Dodgers also shared the same division (NL West) for 24 years (1969–1993), where they finished in the top two positions in the division in 1982, 1983, and 1991, all of which came down to the final week of the season.

This was also the first postseason series since 2006 with three different play-by-play announcers on U.S. television. Joe Davis, the primary announcer for Major League Baseball on Fox, called the first two games of the series, but his voice got progressively worse during those games and he was diagnosed with laryngitis. Kenny Albert then filled in for Game 3, but could not stay due to a pre-arranged assignment calling an NHL on TNT game between the Pittsburgh Penguins and the Washington Capitals on the same day as Game 4. Brandon Gaudin, the full-time BravesVision voice and part-time Fox Sports announcer, took over for Game 4. The analyst (John Smoltz) and field reporter (Ken Rosenthal) were the same for each contest.

=== Game 1 ===
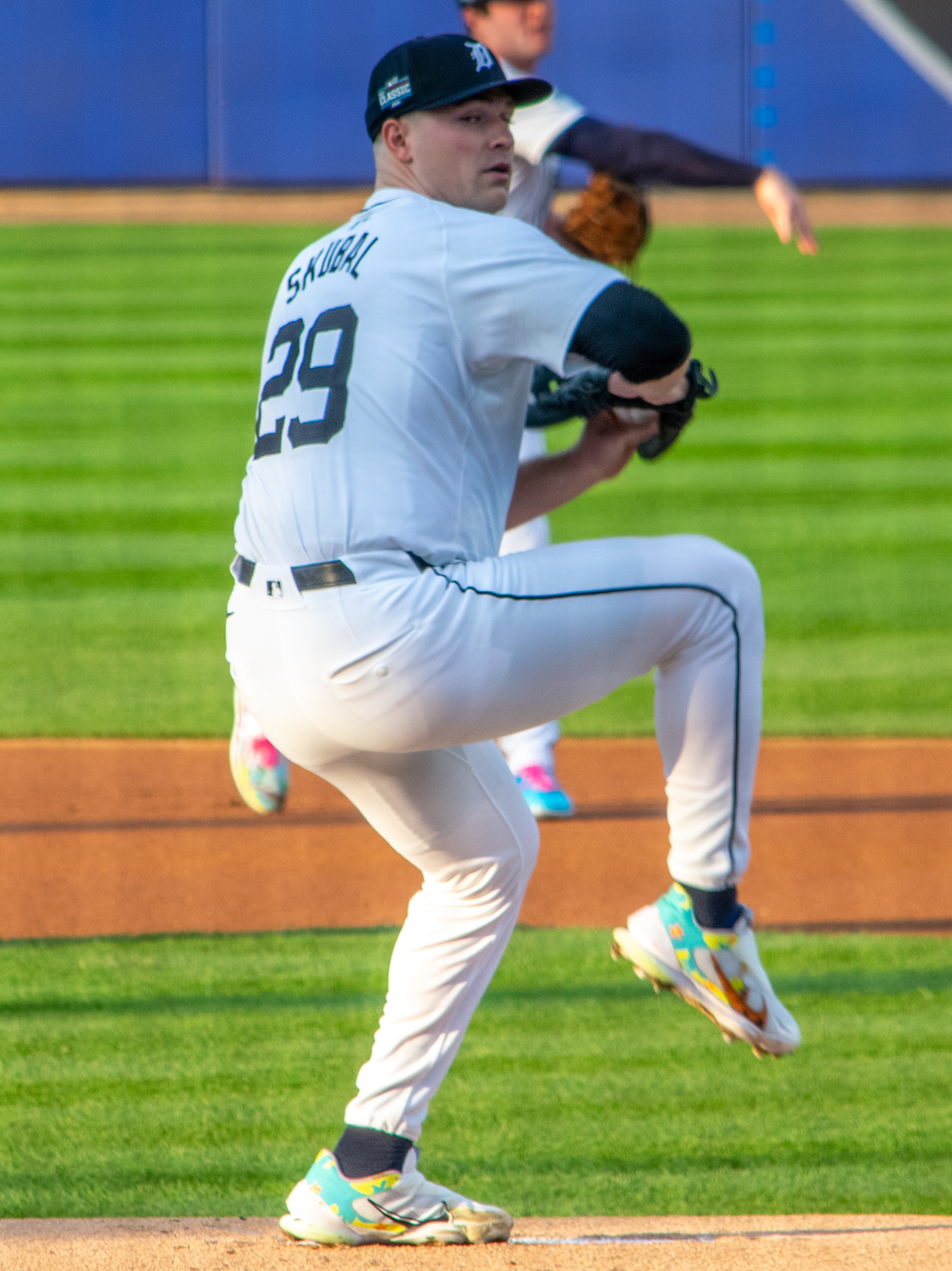
Tarik Skubal held the Braves to one run over six innings on 7 strikeouts in Game 1.

October 3, 2026 1:08 pm (PDT) at Dodger Stadium in Los Angeles, California 100 °F (38 °C), Sunny
Team	1	2	3	4	5	6	7	8	9	R	H	E
Atlanta	0	0	0	0	0	1	0	0	2	3	4	0
Los Angeles	0	0	0	2	0	3	0	0	X	5	7	0
WP: Tarik Skubal (1–0) LP: Víctor Mederos (0–1) Sv: Evan Phillips (1); Home runs: ATL: Sean Murphy (1), Ozzie Albies (1); LAD: Teoscar Hernández (1), Kyle Tucker (1), Max Muncy (1); Attendance: 50,194; Boxscore

At 100 °F (38 °C), this was the second-hottest MLB postseason game on record, following Game 1 of the 2017 World Series between the Astros and Dodgers at Dodger Stadium.

The Dodgers opened the scoring with a two-run home run by Teoscar Hernández in the bottom of the fourth inning off Victor Mederos to give Los Angeles a 2–0 lead. In the top of the sixth inning, Sean Murphy hit a home run off Tarik Skubal to cut the Braves' deficit to 2–1. In the bottom of the sixth, Kyle Tucker hit a two-run home run off AJ Smith-Shawver to extend the Dodgers' lead to 4–1, followed immediately by Max Muncy's solo shot to make it 5–1. It pushed his franchise record for postseason home runs to 17. In the top of the ninth inning, Ozzie Albies hit a two-run home run off Tanner Scott to trim the Braves' deficit to 5–3, which would stand as the final score as the Dodgers secured a 1–0 series lead.

=== Game 2 ===
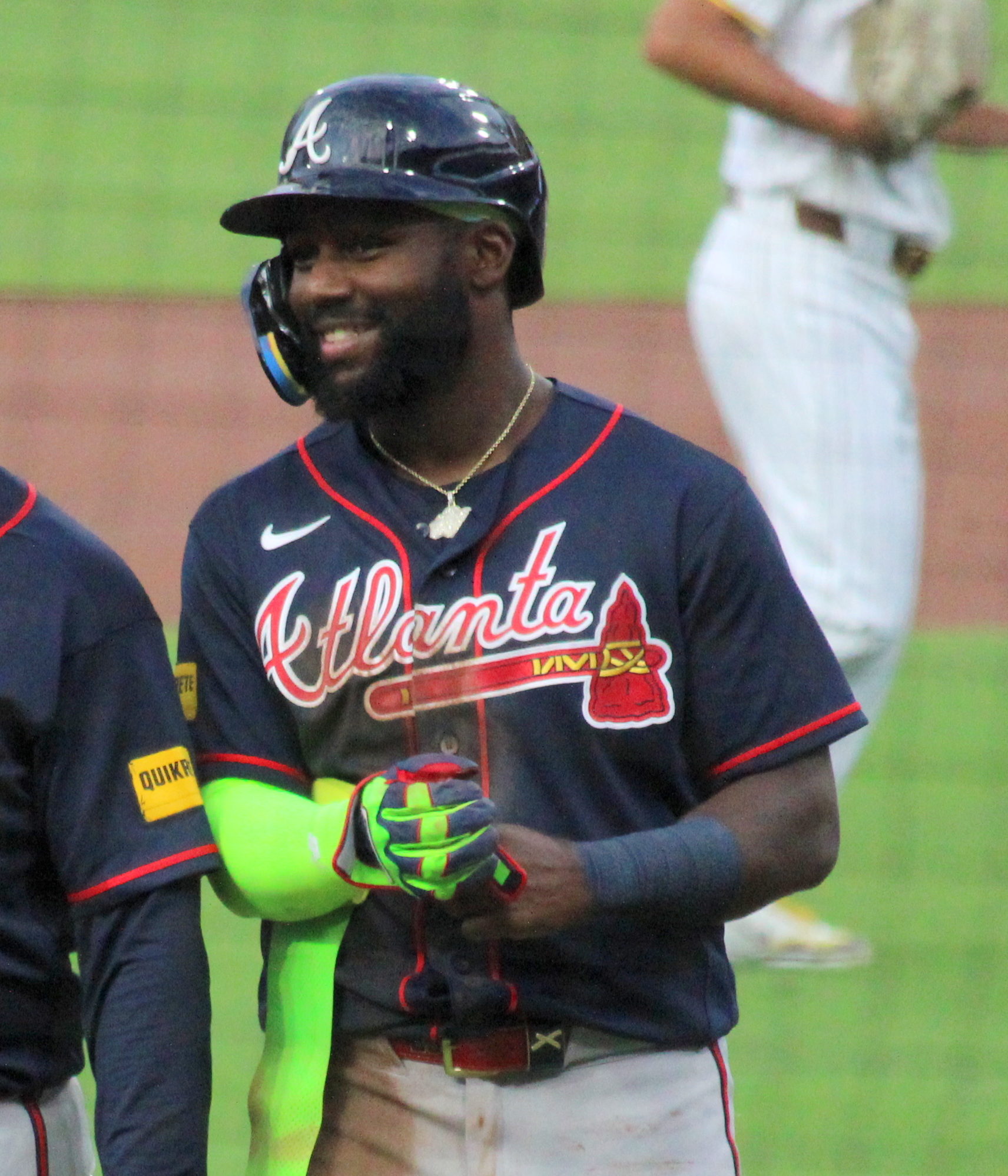
Michael Harris II went 3 for 5 with an RBI and a run scored to help even the series for the Braves.

October 4, 2026 5:03 pm (PDT) at Dodger Stadium in Los Angeles, California 95 °F (35 °C), Partly Cloudy
Team	1	2	3	4	5	6	7	8	9	R	H	E
Atlanta	1	0	0	0	1	0	1	0	0	3	6	0
Los Angeles	0	0	0	1	0	0	0	0	1	2	6	0
WP: Dylan Lee (1–0) LP: Kris Bubic (0–1) Sv: Raisel Iglesias (1); Home runs: ATL: None; LAD: Freddie Freeman (1), Max Muncy (2); Attendance: 50,729; Boxscore

The Braves opened the scoring in the top of the first inning when Ronald Acuña Jr. scored on a bases-loaded infield single by Mauricio Dubón to give the team an early 1–0 lead. Ray Kerr pitched 2 2/3 innings for Atlanta, allowing two hits and no runs while striking out four batters.

The Dodgers tied the game at 1–1 in the bottom of the fourth inning when Freddie Freeman hit a solo home run off Grant Holmes. For Los Angeles, Blake Snell pitched 3 2/3 innings, allowing three hits and one run while walking five batters and striking out five.

Atlanta regained the 2–1 lead in the top of the fifth when Michael Harris II hit a two-out triple and scored on a wild pitch by Kris Bubic. The Braves added another run in the top of the seventh when Harris doubled to drive in Matt Olson, extending their lead to 3–1.

Max Muncy hit his second home run of the series with a solo shot off Didier Fuentes in the bottom of the ninth to cut the deficit to 3–2. Raisel Iglesias then recorded the final out to secure the win for the Braves, evening the series at one game apiece as the series shifts to Atlanta.

=== Game 3 ===
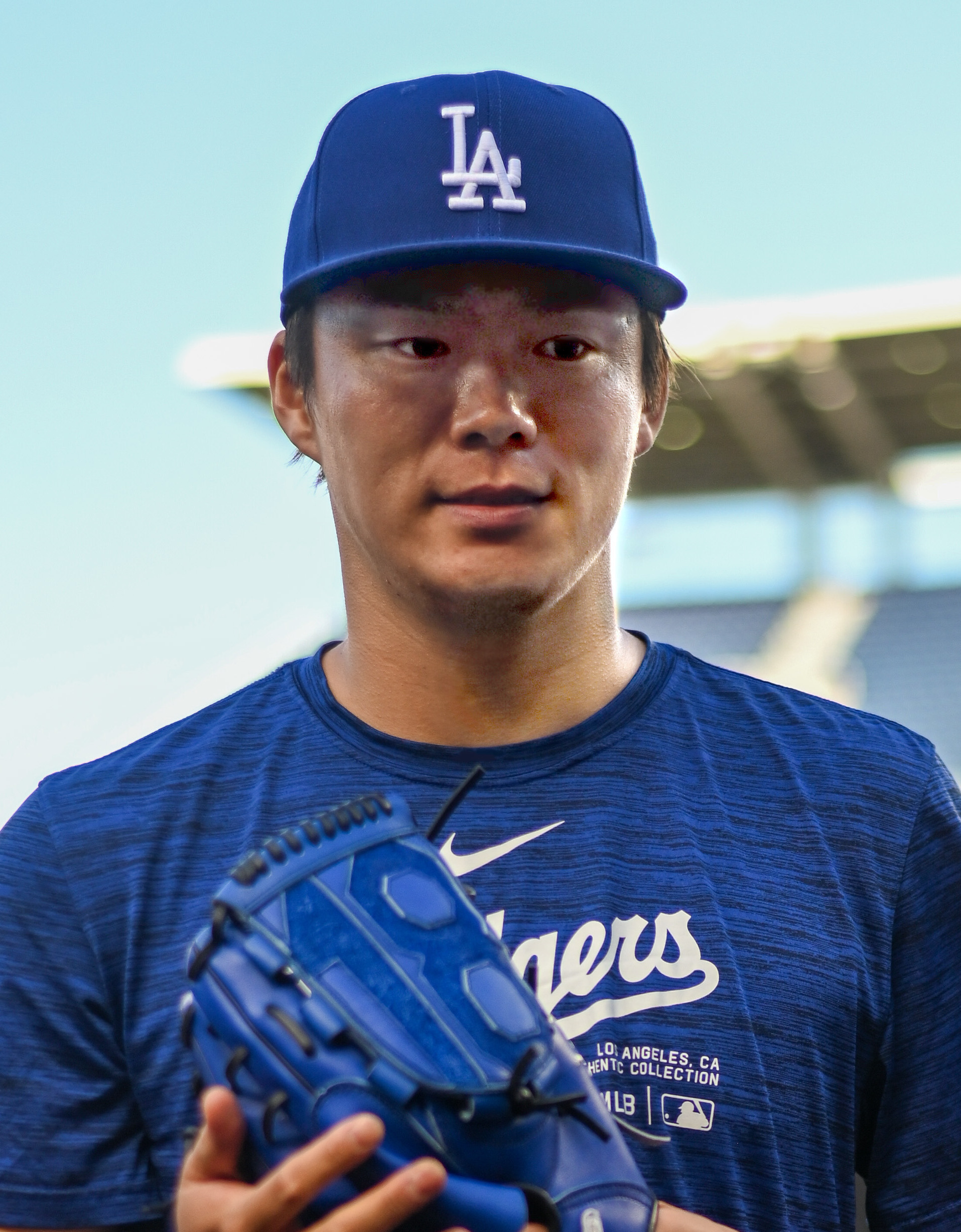
Yoshinobu Yamamoto held the Braves to one run over seven innings on 10 strikeouts in Game 3.

October 6, 2026 6:11 pm (EDT) at Truist Park in Cumberland, Georgia 75 °F (24 °C), Clear
Team	1	2	3	4	5	6	7	8	9	R	H	E
Los Angeles	0	0	0	3	0	0	0	0	0	3	8	0
Atlanta	0	0	0	0	1	0	0	0	0	1	5	2
WP: Yoshinobu Yamamoto (1–0) LP: Chris Sale (0–1) Sv: Edwin Díaz (1); Home runs: LAD: Enrique Hernández (1), Freddie Freeman (2); ATL: None; Attendance: 42,420; Boxscore

The Game 3 pitching match-up, Yoshinobu Yamamoto and Chris Sale, was a rematch of a pitcher's duel from August 27, which Atlanta won, 1–0, behind a Sale complete game shut out.

The Dodgers opened the scoring in the top of the fourth inning when Enrique Hernández hit a two-run home run off Chris Sale. Then Freddie Freeman hit a solo home run to give the Dodgers a 3–0 lead. In the bottom of the fifth inning, the Braves cut the deficit to 3–1 when Mauricio Dubón scored via a Drake Baldwin ground out.

This pitching match-up saw Yamamoto outduel Sale. Sale pitched five innings, allowing seven hits and three runs while striking out seven batters. Yamamoto pitched seven innings, allowing four hits and only one run while striking out ten batters. Edwin Díaz got the save for the Dodgers, and the Dodgers took a 2–1 series lead over the Braves.

=== Game 4 ===
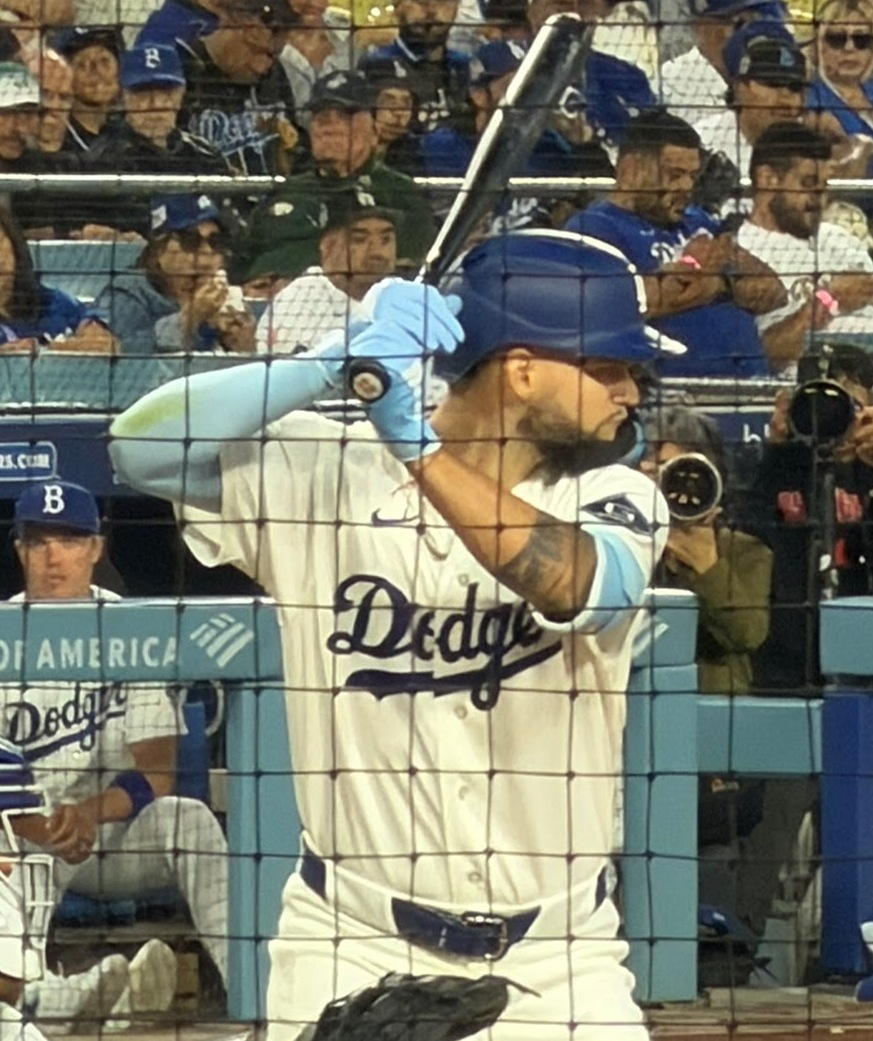
Andy Pages hit a go-ahead two-run single to help the Dodgers advance to their third straight NLCS.

October 7, 2026 6:09 pm (EDT) at Truist Park in Cumberland, Georgia 79 °F (26 °C), Clear
Team	1	2	3	4	5	6	7	8	9	R	H	E
Los Angeles	0	1	0	0	0	0	2	0	1	4	5	0
Atlanta	1	0	0	0	0	0	0	0	0	1	3	2
WP: Edgardo Henriquez (1–0) LP: Tyler Mahle (0–1) Sv: Edwin Díaz (2); Home runs: LAD: Max Muncy (3); ATL: None; Attendance: 41,173; Boxscore

The Braves started the bottom half of the first with a Michael Harris II single followed by a stolen base. Harris II scored on a wild pitch by Tyler Glasnow, giving Atlanta the early lead. The Dodgers started the top of the second inning with a walk to Shohei Ohtani, who stole second, advanced to third following a throwing error by catcher Sean Murphy, and scored on a fielding error by Mauricio Dubón, tying the game at one.

Tyler Glasnow pitched 4 2/3 innings, allowing only one hit and one run with five walks and five strikeouts. Tyler Mahle pitched 6 1/3 innings, allowing three hits and one unearned run with one walk and four strikeouts. In the top of the seventh inning, Andy Pages hit a go-ahead two-run single to give the Dodgers a 3–1 lead. In the top of the ninth inning, Max Muncy hit a solo home run to extend the Dodgers' lead to 4–1, his second ninth-inning home run and his third overall in the series. Edwin Díaz got the save, and the Dodgers advanced to their third consecutive NLCS. With his 72nd career postseason win, Dave Roberts surpassed Tony La Russa for second-most in MLB history.

=== Composite line score ===
2026 NLDS (3–1): Los Angeles Dodgers beat Atlanta Braves

Team	1	2	3	4	5	6	7	8	9	R	H	E
Atlanta Braves	2	0	0	0	2	1	1	0	2	8	18	4
Los Angeles Dodgers	0	1	0	6	0	3	2	0	2	14	27	0
Total attendance: 184,516 Average attendance: 46,129

== See also ==
- 2026 American League Division Series
