= John Tumpane =

American baseball umpire (born 1983)

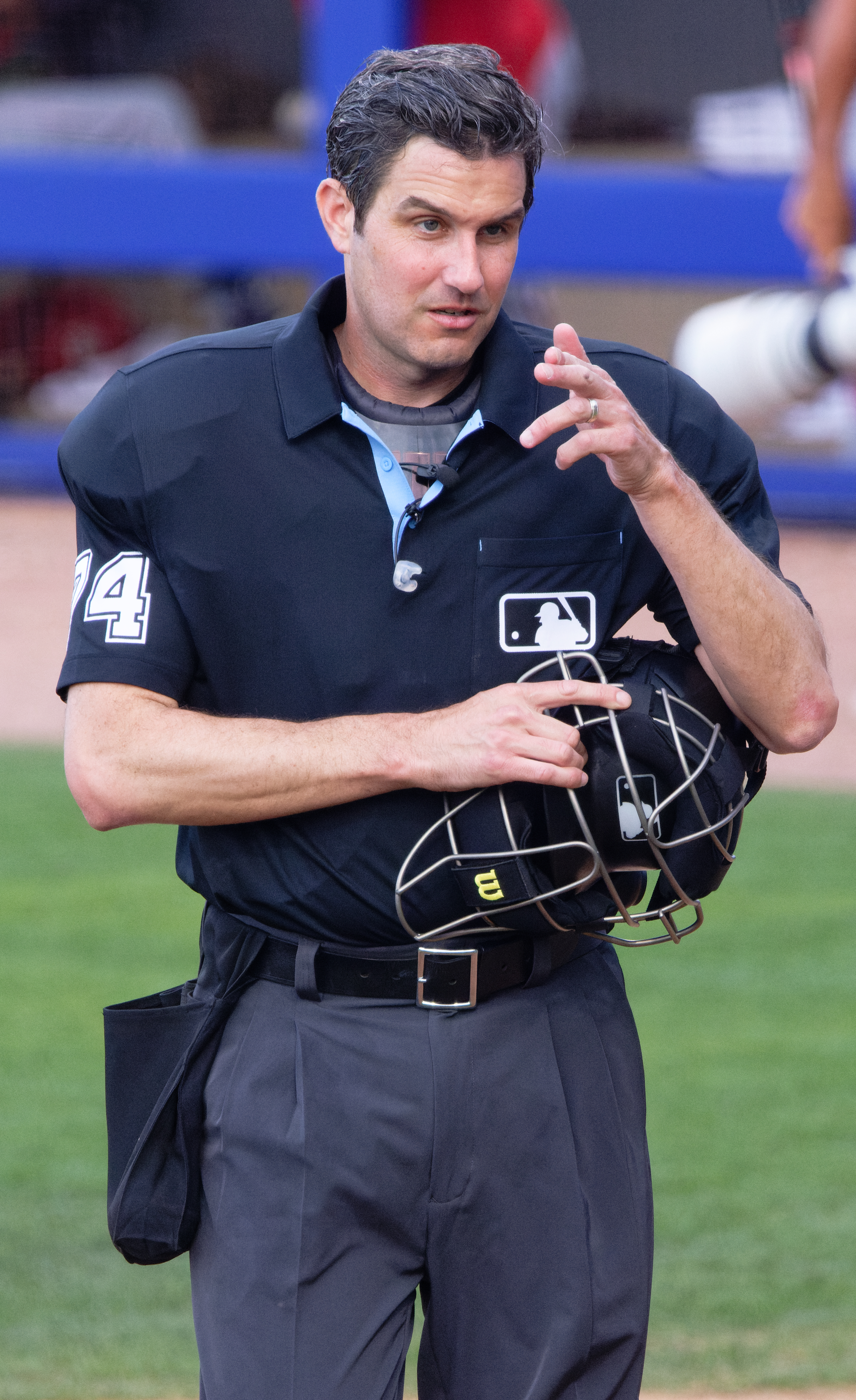
- Tumpane in 2024

MLB – No. 74
- Umpire
- Born: May 4, 1983 (age 43); Evergreen Park, Illinois, U.S.

MLB debut
- August 2, 2010

Crew information
- Umpiring crew: F
- Crew members: #98 Chris Conroy (crew chief); #74 John Tumpane; #97 Ben May; #55 Brennan Miller

Career highlights and awards
- Special assignments: World Series (2025); League Championship Series (2020, 2026); Division Series (2018, 2019, 2022, 2023, 2024, 2025); All-Star Games (2024); Wild Card Games/Series (2017, 2020, 2026); World Baseball Classic (2023); Field of Dreams Game (2022)

John Francis Tumpane (born May 4, 1983) is an American Major League Baseball umpire, who wears number 74.

== Umpiring career ==
He made his major league umpiring debut on August 2, 2010. He umpired in six major league games in 2010, and returned in 2011, umpiring in 68 games. On July 1, 2016, Tumpane was promoted to the full-time MLB umpiring staff.

Tumpane is known for his emphatic and demonstrative strikeout signal in which he hammers his right fist in the direction of the right-hand batter's box in a similar fashion to stabbing, which has earned him the nickname "the Ripper".

== Notable games ==
On August 21, 2015, he was the home plate umpire in Houston for Mike Fiers' no-hitter against the Los Angeles Dodgers. On May 4, 2018, he was the home plate umpire for Walker Buehler, Tony Cingrani, Yimi Garcia, and Adam Liberatore's of the Los Angeles Dodgers combined no-hitter against the San Diego Padres. On August 25, 2020, Tumpane was the second base umpire for a no-hitter thrown by Lucas Giolito of the Chicago White Sox against the Pittsburgh Pirates.

In game 2 of the 2020 American League Championship Series, on October 12, 2020, Tumpane correctly called 134 of 135 pitches at which a batter did not swing.

On September 27, 2022, Tumpane, serving as first base umpire, called an MLB-record 3 balks on Miami Marlins pitcher Richard Bleier while Bleier was pitching to the same batter in a single at bat. Bleier had never been called for a balk in his MLB career previously, over the course of 303 games in seven seasons. It was the only time since at least 1900 that one pitcher was called for a balk three times in a single plate appearance.

== Personal life ==
Tumpane is a 2001 graduate of Saint Laurence High School in Burbank, Illinois. On June 28, 2017, Tumpane helped prevent a suicide attempt on the Roberto Clemente Bridge in Pittsburgh, Pennsylvania prior to umpiring a game between the Tampa Bay Rays and the Pittsburgh Pirates.

== See also ==
- List of Major League Baseball umpires (disambiguation)
