= Jansen Visconti =

American baseball umpire

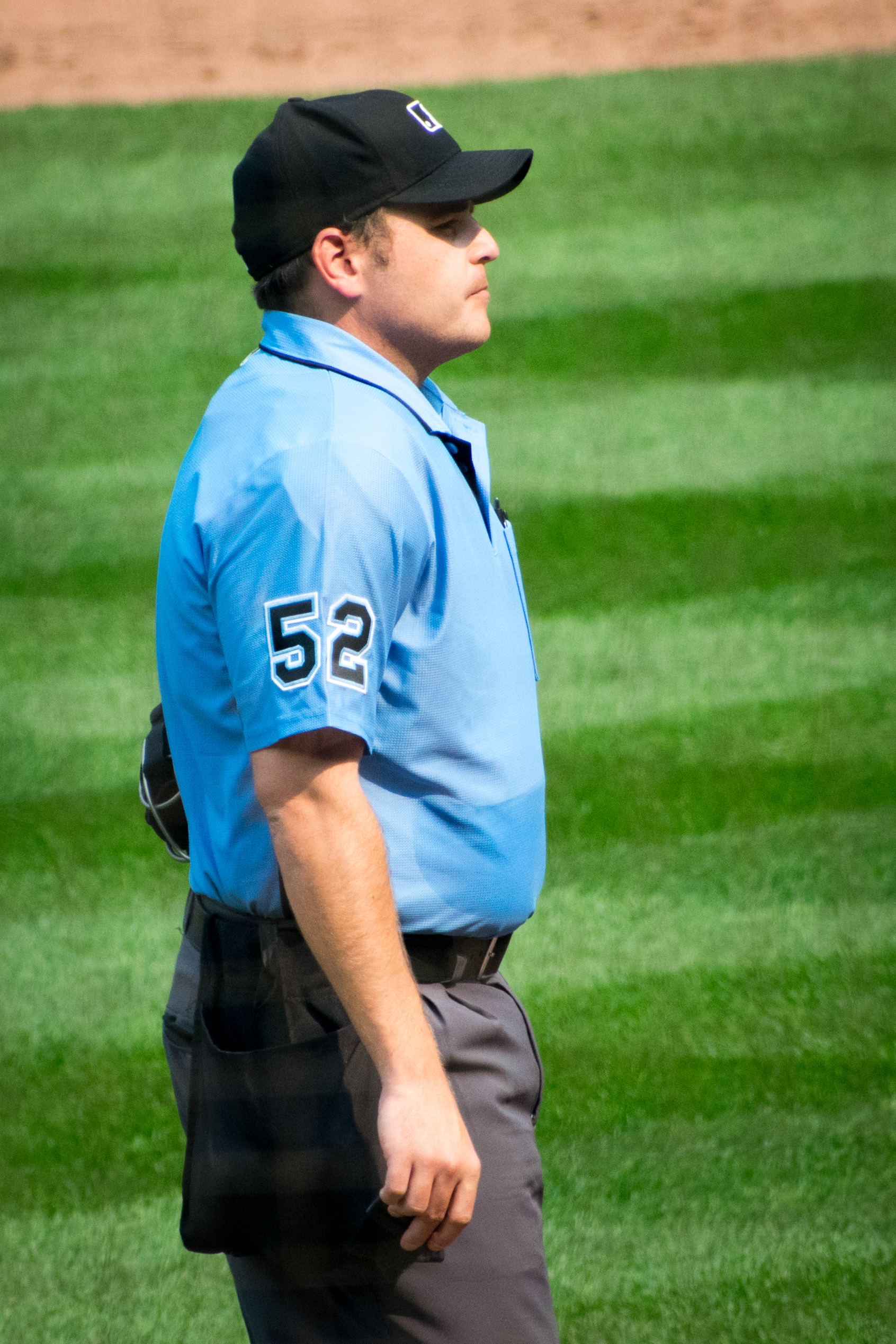

MLB – No. 52
- Umpire
- Born: 1987 or 1988 (age 38–39); Latrobe, Pennsylvania, U.S.

MLB debut
- April 17, 2018

Crew information
- Umpiring crew: H
- Crew members: #49 Andy Fletcher (crew chief); #89 Cory Blaser; #52 Jansen Visconti; #66 Alex Tosi

Career highlights and awards
- Special Assignments: All-Star Games (2025); Wild Card Games/Series (2021, 2024); Division Series (2022, 2023, 2026); League Championship Series (2024)

Jansen Visconti is an American umpire in Major League Baseball who was hired to the full-time staff in 2020 and wears number 52.

Visconti suffered a hand injury by a foul ball as home plate umpire during the fourth inning of the Detroit Tigers and Cleveland Guardians game on July 10, 2024.

During the 2026 MLB season, Visconti was the least overturned umpire (minimum 100 challenges) with 42.2% of challenged calls overturned. For context, the most overturned umpire in 2026 had 66.1% of their challenged calls overturned.

== See also ==
- List of Major League Baseball umpires (disambiguation)
