= Harry Ford (baseball) =

American baseball player (born 2003)

- Ford with the Washington Nationals in 2026

Washington Nationals – No. 17
- Catcher
- Born: February 21, 2003 (age 23); Atlanta, Georgia, U.S.
- Bats: Right Throws: Right

MLB debut
- September 5, 2025, for the Seattle Mariners

MLB statistics (through 2026 season)
- Batting average: .189
- Home runs: 3
- Runs batted in: 11
- Stats at Baseball Reference

Teams
- Seattle Mariners (2025); Washington Nationals (2026–present)
Medals
Men's baseball
Representing Great Britain
European Championship
Silver medal – second place	2023 Czechia	Team

Harrison Michael Ford (born February 21, 2003) is a British-American professional baseball catcher for the Washington Nationals of Major League Baseball (MLB). He was selected by the Seattle Mariners in the first round of the 2021 MLB draft and made his MLB debut in 2025. He represents Great Britain at the international level.

== Amateur career ==
Ford attended North Cobb High School in Kennesaw, Georgia. As a senior, he batted .296 with seven doubles and five home runs and was named the Greater Atlanta Player of the Year by MaxPreps. Ford played in 104 games over four varsity seasons and batted for a .343 average with 83 runs scored, 20 doubles, seven triples, seven home runs, and 57 runs batted in (RBI). He committed to play college baseball at Georgia Tech.

== Professional career ==
=== Seattle Mariners ===
==== Draft and minor leagues ====
The Seattle Mariners selected Ford in the first round, with the 12th overall pick, in the 2021 Major League Baseball draft. On July 22, 2021, he signed with the Mariners for the assigned slot value of $4.36 million. Ford made his professional debut that summer with the Rookie-level Arizona Complex League Mariners, slashing 0.291/0.400/0.482 with three home runs, ten RBI, seven doubles, nine walks, and 14 strikeouts over 65 plate appearances.

Ford played in 2022 for the Modesto Nuts of the Single-A California League. He hit 0.274 with 11 home runs. In 2023, he was promoted to the High-A Everett AquaSox, where he hit 0.257 with 15 home runs. He was a postseason Northwest League All-Star, leading the league with 103 walks. Ford advanced another level in 2024, and his batting average continued to drop, hitting 0.249 with 7 home runs for the Double-A Arkansas Travelers. He suffered a concussion in late July, landing on the injured list for 7 days.

Ford was selected to play in the All-Star Futures Game in 2023, 2024, and 2025. He struck out in his single at-bat in 2023, and he walked in his lone plate appearance in 2024. He struck out again in 2025, also throwing out an attempted base stealer. Ford was named the Mariners' top prospect and a top 50 overall prospect by MLB.com before the 2023 season and the top Mariners prospect and #40 overall prospect by FanGraphs in the middle of the 2024 season.

Ford began the 2025 season with the Triple-A Tacoma Rainiers, batting 0.283/0.408/0.460 with 16 home runs, 74 RBI, and seven stolen bases across 97 games. In late June, he joined the Mariners as catcher Mitch Garver recovered from a jaw injury, but Ford was not added to the team's roster. After the season, Minor League Baseball named him the top prospect in the Pacific Coast League.

==== Major leagues ====
On September 1, 2025, the Mariners added Ford to their 40-man squad and promoted him the major leagues. He made his MLB debut on September 5 against the Atlanta Braves, striking out on three pitches as a pinch hitter. Two days later, after entering as a defensive replacement, he was hit by a pitch and scored his first run in the majors. On September 11, he drove in his first major league run with a 12th-inning, walk-off sacrifice fly to right field to beat the Los Angeles Angels. He had his first MLB hit, a single off Tyler Glasnow of the Los Angeles Dodgers on September 27. In his September call-up, Ford batted 1-for-6 in 8 games.

In his first postseason, Ford, on the roster as a backup catcher, batted once, hitting a single at the end of Game 3 of the American League Championship Series.

=== Washington Nationals ===
On December 6, 2025, the Mariners traded Ford, along with prospect pitcher Isaac Lyon, to the Washington Nationals in exchange for José A. Ferrer. Ford was optioned to the Triple-A Rochester Red Wings to begin the 2026 season. On June 17, 2026, he made his Nationals debut, in which he hit his first career home run, going two for five with three RBI, in a 23-4 Nationals win over the Athletics.

== International career ==
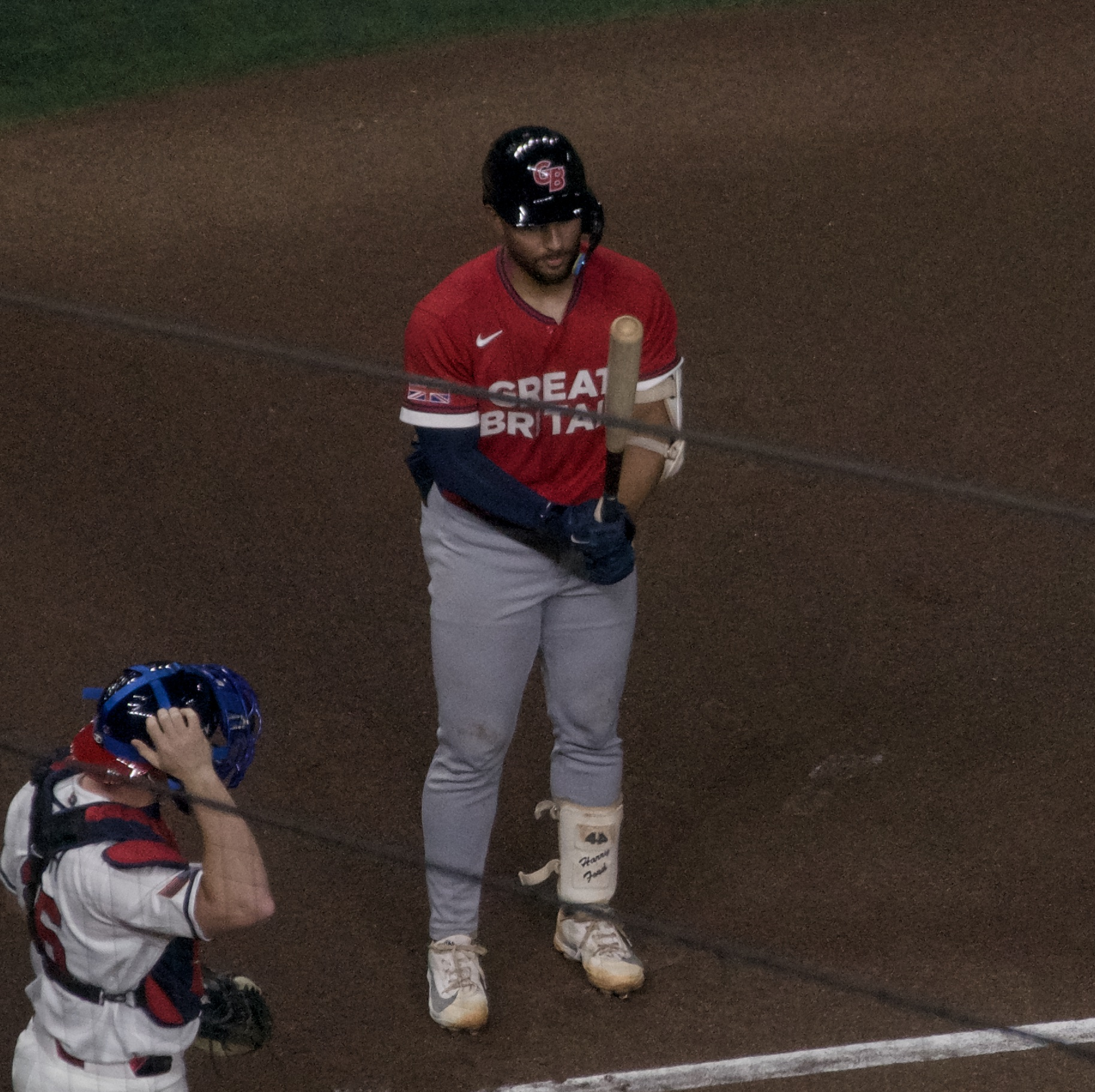
Ford with Great Britain during the 2026 World Baseball Classic

Ford plays for Great Britain in international competition because it is the birthplace of both his parents. At the 2023 World Baseball Classic (WBC) qualifiers in Germany in September 2022, he helped his team win all three of its games, homering in the team's final victory over Spain. His three home runs led the qualifiers, and his 8 RBI tied for the most. He then played for Great Britain in the 2023 WBC, hitting two home runs and batting .308 in four games.

At the 2023 European Baseball Championship in September 2023 in the Czech Republic, Ford played catcher and DH and batted .429 with 3 home runs in 21 at-bats, leading the tournament with 12 RBI and 5 stolen bases.

== Personal life ==
Growing up in the Atlanta area, Ford was a fan of Freddie Freeman and the Atlanta Braves. He competed against Freeman in the 2023 WBC. In 2025, Ford made his MLB debut in Atlanta and later greeted Freeman, then with the Los Angeles Dodgers, after collecting his first MLB hit.

Ford is mixed race. His parents met in Georgia, where he was born. They later divorced, and his father lives in the United Kingdom. As a child, he attended catching clinics led by former MLB catcher Charles Johnson. Ford said it would "be cool to change that stigma" regarding a lack of African-American catchers in MLB.

Ford received the Mariners' "Dan Wilson Community Service Award" in 2023. In 2025, he pledged a donation for every home run he hit to a charitable organization that provides safe drinking water. He chose that cause after visiting Peru in January 2025.
