= Alex Tosi =

Canadian–American baseball umpire (born 1988)

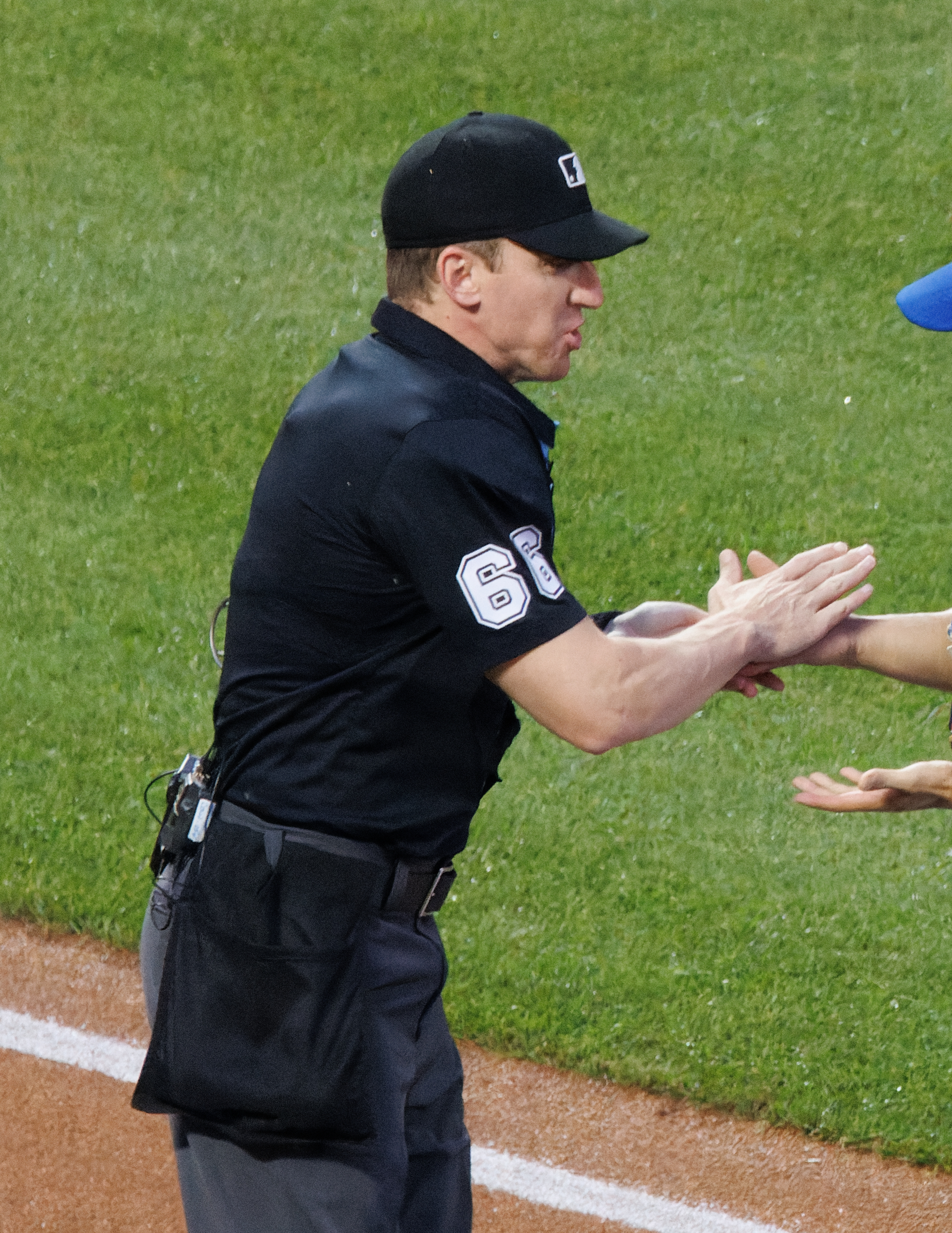
- Tosi in 2023

MLB – No. 66
- Umpire
- Born: March 7, 1988 (age 38); Markham, Ontario, Canada

MLB debut
- May 11, 2019

Crew information
- Umpiring crew: H
- Crew members: #49 Andy Fletcher (crew chief); #89 Cory Blaser; #52 Jansen Visconti; #66 Alex Tosi

Career highlights and awards
- Special assignments: Wild Card Games/Series (2023, 2024, 2026); Division Series (2025); Triple-A National Championship Game (2018)

Alexander Vincent Tosi (born March 7, 1988) is a Canadian-born American Major League Baseball umpire. He made his first appearance at the Major League level in 2019 and was promoted to the full-time umpiring staff for the 2023 season.

He wears uniform number 66.

== Career ==
Tosi began umpiring while playing high school baseball. He made his professional debut in June 2011 in State College, Pennsylvania in the short-season New York–Penn League. He made his first ejection when State College Spikes manager Leo Gómez bumped him during an argument and then tore third base out of the ground. He made his full-season debut the following season in the Midwest League. He also spent time in the Midwest, Florida State, Arizona Instructional, and Eastern leagues before his Triple-A advancement in 2016. He served as third base umpire for the 2018 Triple-A National Championship Game, and was a crew chief in the International League the following season.

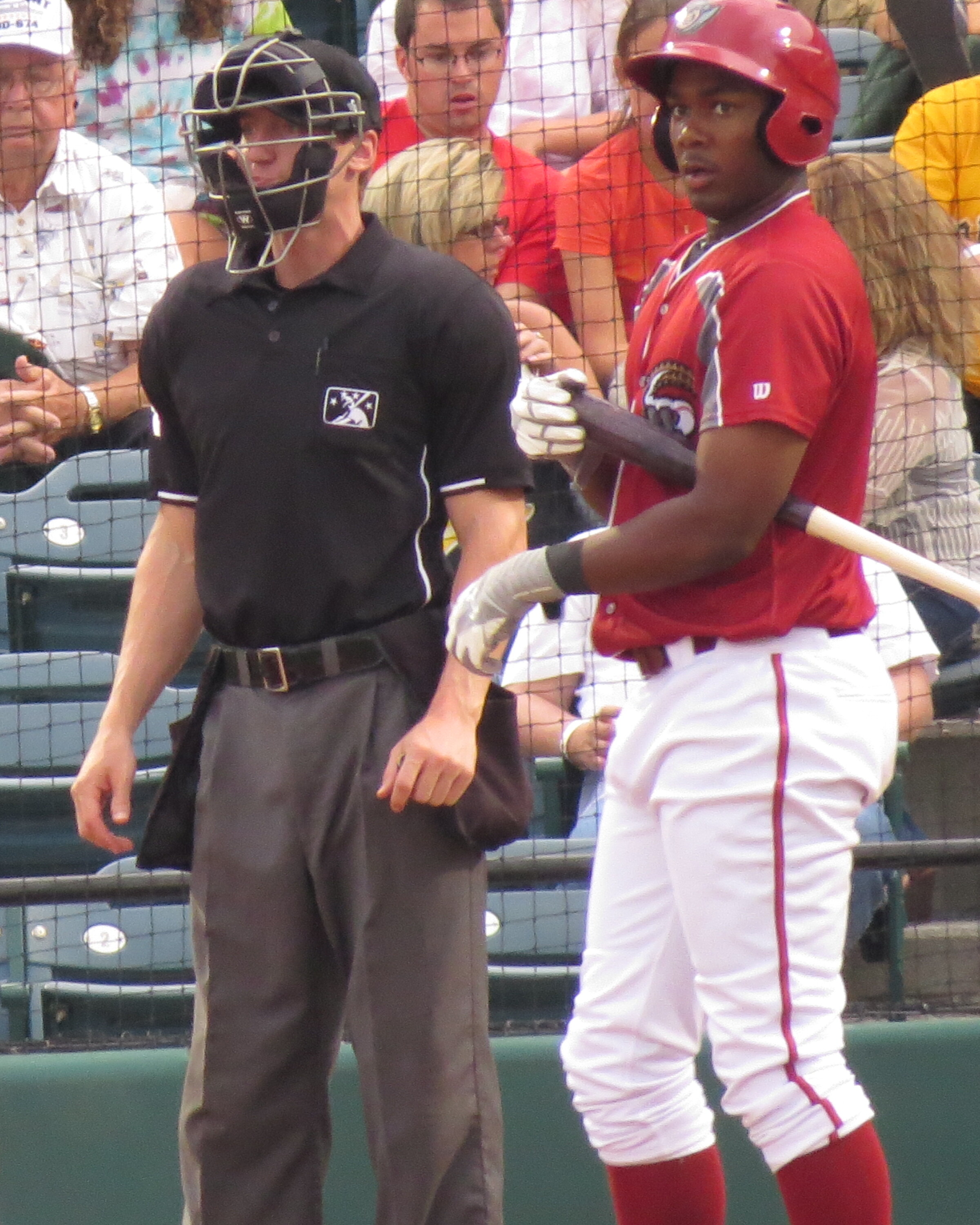
Tosi (left) as home plate umpire during a Josh Bell plate appearance in the New York–Penn League in 2014

On May 11, 2019, he made his major league debut for the first game of a doubleheader between the Detroit Tigers and the Minnesota Twins at Target Field. Tosi was on first base, with Jordan Baker at second, Paul Nauert at third, and Hunter Wendelstedt as home plate umpire.

Tosi was home plate umpire for the Houston Astros combined no-hitter against the New York Yankees at Yankee Stadium on June 25, 2022.

In December 2022, he was hired as a full time MLB umpire. Upon hearing the news, Tosi’s father congratulated him on "officially [having his] first full time job". At the conclusion of the 2023 season, he was awarded his first postseason assignment: the 2023 American League Wild Card Series between the Texas Rangers and the Tampa Bay Rays.

The following year, Tosi was assigned to the National League Wild Card Series between the New York Mets and the Milwaukee Brewers. He worked home plate for game one of the series.

== Personal life ==
Tosi was raised in Peoria, Illinois, and graduated from Dunlap High School in 2006. He played NCAA Division III baseball as a pitcher at Illinois Wesleyan University and was a part of the 2010 National Championship team his senior year. He received a degree in finance. After graduation, he studied sports management at Illinois State University for one semester before enrolling at Harry Wendelstedt Umpire School.

During the minor league offseason, Tosi worked in the finance department of Case New Holland’s Racine, Wisconsin, office. He was living in Missouri when he was hired as a full-time major league umpire, and currently resides in Arizona.

== See also ==
- List of Major League Baseball umpires (disambiguation)
