= Roberto Ortiz (umpire) =

Puerto Rican baseball umpire (born 1984)

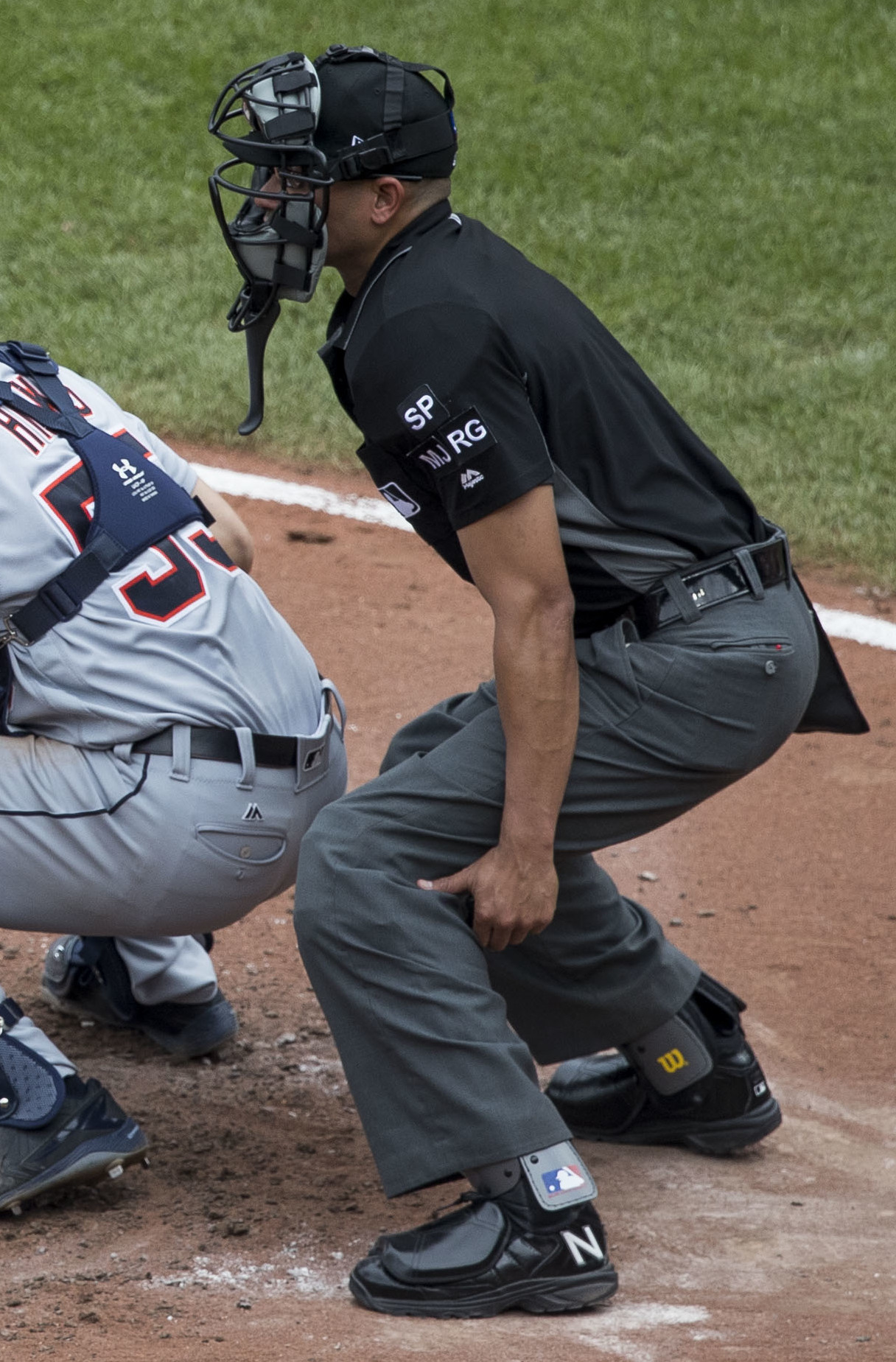
- Ortiz in 2017

MLB – No. 40
- Umpire
- Born: December 16, 1984 (age 41); Caguas, Puerto Rico

MLB debut
- May 14, 2016

Crew information
- Umpiring crew: D
- Crew members: #64 Alan Porter (crew chief); #28 Jim Wolf; #40 Roberto Ortiz; #9 Alex MacKay

Career highlights and awards
- Division Series (2023, 2024, 2025, 2026); Wild Card Games/Series (2022); World Baseball Classic (2023); Puerto Rico series (2018); First Puerto Rican umpire to work an MLB regular season game in Puerto Rico

Roberto Carlos Ortiz Maymi (born December 16, 1984) is a Puerto Rican Major League Baseball (MLB) umpire. He made his debut on May 14, 2016, becoming the first MLB umpire since Delfin Colon to have been born in Puerto Rico. He wears number 40, which was most recently worn by former umpire Jeff Gosney.

During the 2016 season, Ortiz umpired eight games (two as the home plate umpire), and during 2017 he umpired 66 games (14 behind the plate).

== See also ==
- List of Major League Baseball umpires (disambiguation)
