= Florida Instructional League =

The Florida Instructional League (FIL), sometimes known informally as "instructs", is an American professional baseball league. (Note: While not part of a Minor League Baseball league, FIL is operated by major-league teams and those who play in the league are paid.'"`UNIQ--ref-00000000-QINU`"') The league was founded in 1958. Young major league prospects hone their skills in the FIL, while experienced players may go there to rehabilitate from an injury, to learn a new position or to refine a particular skill. The league plays its games in September and October.

== History ==
The Florida Instructional League was founded in 1958. Many Major League Baseball (MLB) players have spent time in the league, including Pete Rose, Joe Torre, Boog Powell, Gary Carter, and Steve Carlton.

In the fall of 1964, Catfish Hunter played in the league—he went on to make his major-league debut on May 13, 1965, without playing in Minor League Baseball.

In 1968, Boston Red Sox outfielder Tony Conigliaro played in the league to attempt a comeback as a pitcher after suffering an injury to the face and eye the year before. Conigliaro did not make it as a pitcher, but he returned to the major leagues as an outfielder.

Whitey Herzog received his first managerial opportunity in the FIL, leading the team fielded by the New York Mets organization. Several former major league stars have served as coaches in the league, including Ted Williams, Willie Mays and Ted Simmons. Lou Brock coached in the league while still an active player for the St. Louis Cardinals.

== See also ==
- Arizona Instructional League
