= Nacho Alvarez Jr. =

American baseball player (born 2003)

Los Angeles Angels
- Infielder
- Born: April 11, 2003 (age 23); Fontana, California, U.S.
- Bats: Right Throws: Right

MLB debut
- July 22, 2024, for the Atlanta Braves

MLB statistics (through 2025 season)
- Batting average: .216
- Home runs: 2
- Runs batted in: 15
- Stats at Baseball Reference

Teams
- Atlanta Braves (2024–2025)

Ignacio "Nacho" Alvarez Jr. (born April 11, 2003) is an American professional baseball infielder for the Los Angeles Angels of Major League Baseball (MLB). He has previously played in MLB for the Atlanta Braves. He made his MLB debut in 2024.

== Career ==
=== Atlanta Braves ===
Alvarez attended Kaiser High School in Fontana, California and played college baseball at Riverside City College. He was drafted by the Atlanta Braves in the fifth round, with the 155th overall selection, of the 2022 Major League Baseball draft.

Alvarez spent his first professional season with the rookie–level Florida Complex League Braves and Single–A Augusta GreenJackets. Alvarez spent 2023 with the High–A Rome Braves, playing in 116 games and slashing .284/.395/.391 with seven home runs, 66 RBI, and 16 stolen bases.

Alvarez began the 2024 season with the Double–A Mississippi Braves, and was later promoted to the Triple–A Gwinnett Stripers. On July 22, 2024, Alvarez was selected to the 40-man roster and promoted to the major leagues for the first time. He was held hitless in his major league debut later that day. In eight appearances during his rookie campaign, Alvarez went 3-for-30 (.100).

Alvarez began the 2025 season on the injured list due to left wrist inflammation, and was transferred to the 60-day injured list on April 23, 2025. He was activated from the injured list on June 16, and was subsequently optioned to Triple-A Gwinnett. After Austin Riley was placed on the ten day injured list, Alvarez was promoted to the major league team. On September 20, Alvarez recorded his first major league home run, hitting two of them in a win against the Detroit Tigers. He made 58 appearances for Atlanta during the regular season, slashing .234/.296/.330 with two home runs, 15 RBI, and 12 walks.

Alvarez was optioned to Triple-A Gwinnett to begin the 2026 season.

=== Los Angeles Angels ===
On August 3, 2026, the Braves traded Alvarez to the Los Angeles Angels in exchange for Brent Suter.

== International career ==
Alvarez was called up to play for the Mexico national baseball team at the 2026 World Baseball Classic as a replacement for Ramón Urías.
