= Arizona Instructional League =

American professional baseball league

The Arizona Instructional League (AIL), sometimes known informally as "instructs", is an American professional baseball league. Young major league prospects hone their skills in the AIL, while experienced players may go there to rehabilitate from an injury, to learn a new position or to refine a particular skill.

== Description ==
The Arizona Instructional League was established in 1960, with four teams (affiliated with the Baltimore Orioles, Chicago Cubs, Los Angeles Dodgers, and San Francisco Giants) playing from October 15 to December 15.

The league, which now plays its games during September and October, serves to develop players who have been drafted by teams in Major League Baseball (MLB). These players are often young prospects in their early careers in Minor League Baseball. An older player may go to "instructs" to hone a particular skill or to learn a new position.

The league is similar to the Florida Instructional League and was used as a more formal minor league during the 1960s and 1970s, prior to the formation of the Arizona League (now the Arizona Complex League).
