= C. B. Bucknor =

Jamaican baseball umpire (born 1962)

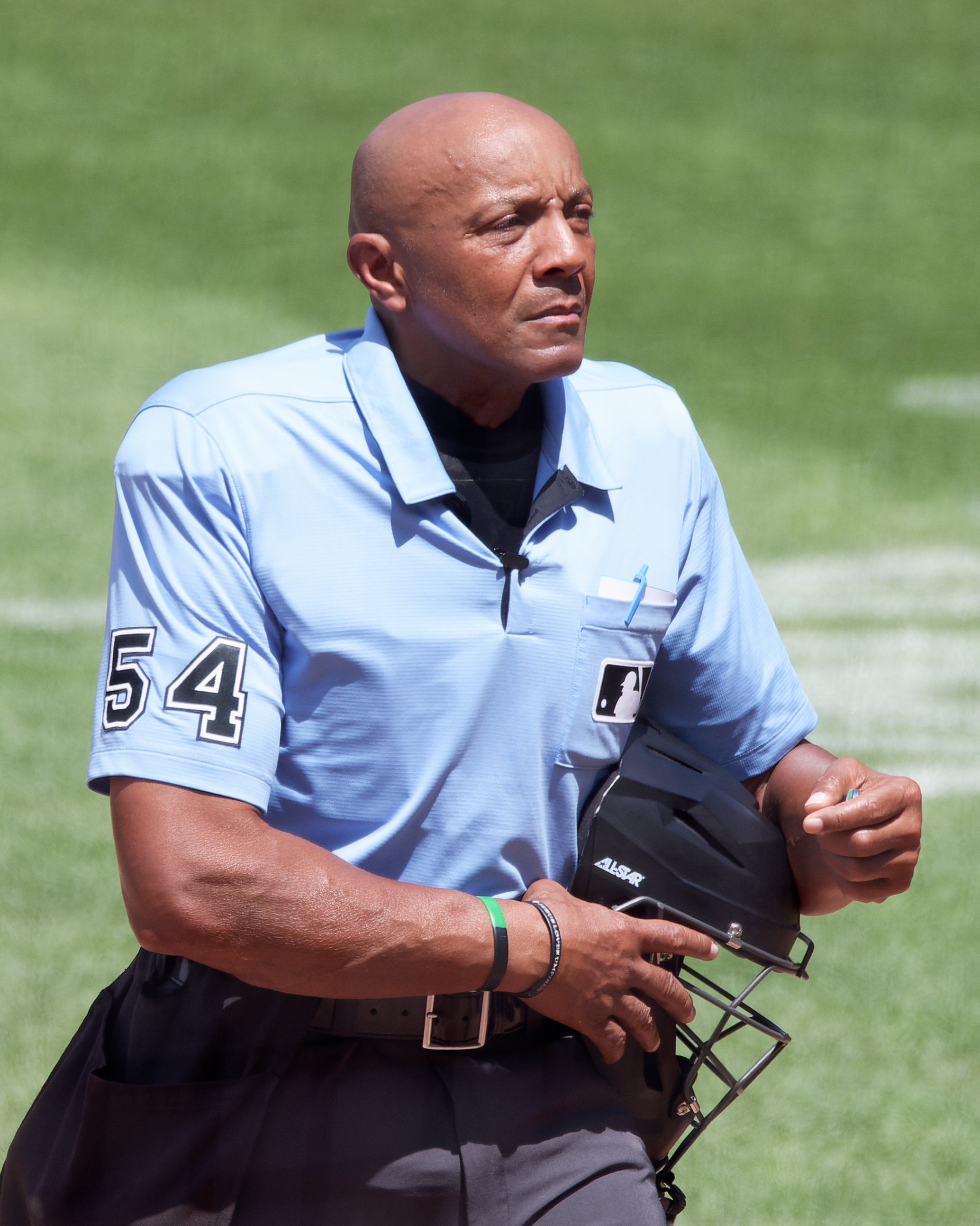
- Bucknor in 2024
- Umpire
- Born: August 23, 1962 (age 64); Savanna-la-Mar, Jamaica

MLB debut
- April 4, 1996

Last appearance
- April 1, 2026

Career highlights and awards
- Special assignments: Division Series (2007, 2008, 2009, 2013, 2020); Wild Card Games/Series (2020); All-Star Games (2005, 2021); Rickwood Field Game (2024)

Christopher Blake Bucknor (born August 23, 1962) is a Jamaican former umpire in Major League Baseball (MLB) who worked in the National League (NL) from 1996 to 1999 and has worked in both major leagues since 2000.

== Umpiring career ==
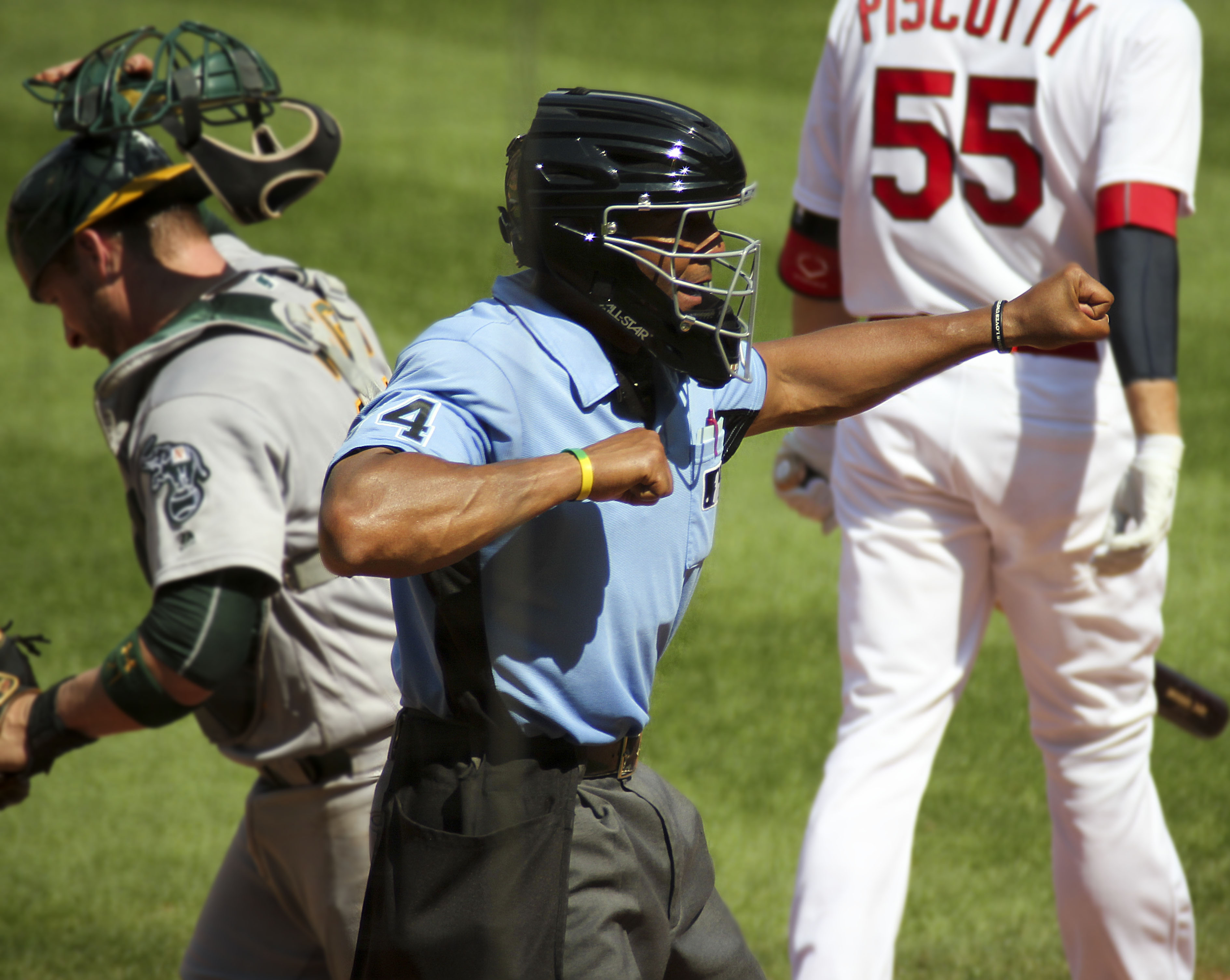
Bucknor calling Stephen Piscotty out on strikes, 2016

Bucknor was a member of the umpiring crew for the 2005 and 2021 All-Star Games, and also for the 2007, 2008, 2009, 2013, and 2020 American League Division Series.

In 2003 and in 2006, Sports Illustrated surveys of active major league players voted Bucknor as the worst umpire in MLB. In a 2010 ESPN survey of 100 active players, Bucknor was again named the worst umpire in MLB.

Bucknor was the first base umpire for then-Detroit Tigers pitcher Justin Verlander's second no-hitter, thrown on May 7, 2011, against the Toronto Blue Jays.

Bucknor was the home plate umpire for Chicago White Sox pitcher Lucas Giolito’s no-hitter, thrown on August 25, 2020, against the Pittsburgh Pirates.

Following the retirement of Phil Cuzzi in 2025, Bucknor became one of the two longest-tenured active umpires.

While working behind home plate during a game between the Cincinnati Reds and Boston Red Sox on March 28, 2026, Bucknor had six pitch calls overturned by the Automated Ball-Strike System (ABS), including two consecutive third-strike calls that the batter, Eugenio Suárez, successfully challenged. Including calls that were not subject to ABS challenges, Bucknor's umpire scorecard showed that he missed 26 ball–strike calls in that game, more than any umpire in their first appearance of 2026.

Three days after the Reds–Red Sox game, Bucknor again attracted criticism for a bad call in a game between the Milwaukee Brewers and Tampa Bay Rays. The call, that runner Jake Bauers was out because he had failed to touch first base, was overturned quickly on an instant replay challenge, prompting laughter from both teams' managers and a surprised response from the Brewers' play-by-play broadcaster.

On July 5, 2026, USA Today's Bob Nightengale reported that Bucknor was one of seven umpires who had accepted a buyout from Major League Baseball to retire after the 2026 season.

=== Injuries ===
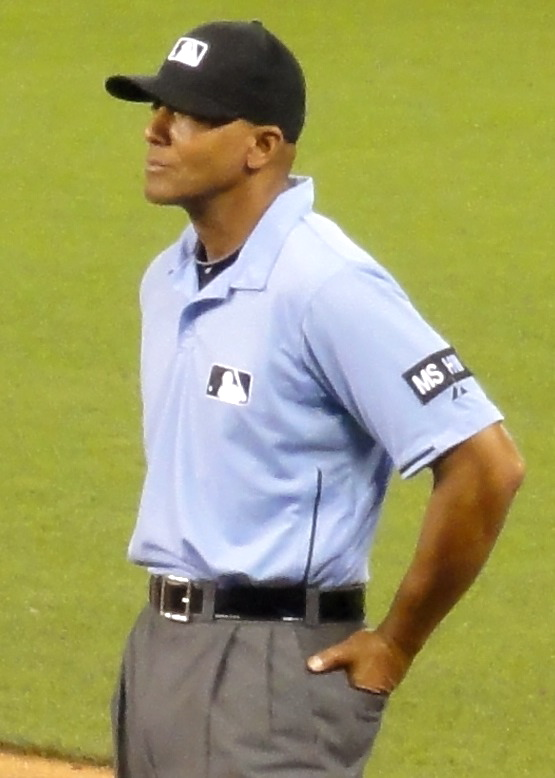
Bucknor in 2012

On May 1, 2012, Bucknor suffered an undisclosed injury during a game between the Pittsburgh Pirates and St. Louis Cardinals and was forced to leave the contest. He was listed as "day-to-day" following the injury and was replaced by minor league call-up umpire D.J. Reyburn the following day.

On July 12, 2013, Bucknor was injured and left an Oakland A's/Boston Red Sox game when he was hit in the facemask by a 92-mile per hour pitch thrown by Jarrod Parker after it grazed Daniel Nava. Crew chief and second base umpire Bill Miller replaced Bucknor behind the plate.

On April 1, 2026, after taking a foul ball off of a Jacob Misiorowski 100-mph fastball to the facemask at American Family Field in Milwaukee, Bucknor was removed from the game. As of May 28, 2026, Bucknor had not returned to the field, which an unnamed source attributed to the injury, and not to any disciplinary action by Major League Baseball.

== Personal life ==
Bucknor moved to the United States in 1973. He attended State University of New York at Cortland, where he played center field, and received a B.S. in Recreation Therapy in 1984.

Bucknor resides in Brooklyn, New York. He works with the Bonnie Youth Club in Brooklyn and was inducted into the Bonnies Hall of Fame in 2000 as well as the Cortland Athletic Hall of Fame in October 2002. Bucknor is actively involved in teaching baseball to children in Jamaica. He also collects toys and helps to organize an annual "Treat Day"—a holiday party, featuring athletic events, video games, and picnics—for over 300 children in Jamaica. In 2008, he was inducted into the Brooklyn Parade Grounds Baseball League Hall of Fame.

== See also ==
- Laz Díaz
- Ángel Hernández (umpire)
- Joe West (umpire)
