= MLB at Rickwood Field =

Special Major League Baseball event

MLB at Rickwood Field: A Tribute to the Negro Leagues
	1	2	3	4	5	6	7	8	9	R	H	E
San Francisco Giants (Note: Playing as the San Francisco Sea Lions)	0	0	3	0	0	2	0	0	0	5	11	0
St. Louis Cardinals (Note: Playing as the St. Louis Stars)	3	0	2	0	1	0	0	0	×	6	7	0
- Date: June 20, 2024
- Venue: Rickwood Field
- City: Birmingham, Alabama
- Managers: Bob Melvin (San Francisco Giants (Note: Playing as the San Francisco Sea Lions)); Oliver Marmol (St. Louis Cardinals (Note: Playing as the St. Louis Stars))
- Umpires: HP: Alan Porter; 1B: Adrian Johnson (Note: Crew Chief); 2B: Malachi Moore; 3B: C. B. Bucknor
- Attendance: 8,332
- Time of game: 6:30 p.m. CDT
- Ceremonial first pitch: Bill Greason
- Television: Fox
- TV announcers: Joe Davis (play-by-play); John Smoltz (analyst); Ken Rosenthal (reporter); Tom Verducci (reporter)

MLB at Rickwood Field: A Tribute to the Negro Leagues was a Major League Baseball (MLB) specialty game played between the National League (NL) West's San Francisco Giants and the NL Central's St. Louis Cardinals on June 20, 2024. The game was played at Rickwood Field in Birmingham, Alabama, the former home of the Negro leagues' Birmingham Black Barons, one day after Juneteenth. This was the first regular-season Major League Baseball (MLB) game played in the state of Alabama. The Cardinals won 6–5.

== Background ==
Front entrance of Rickwood Field

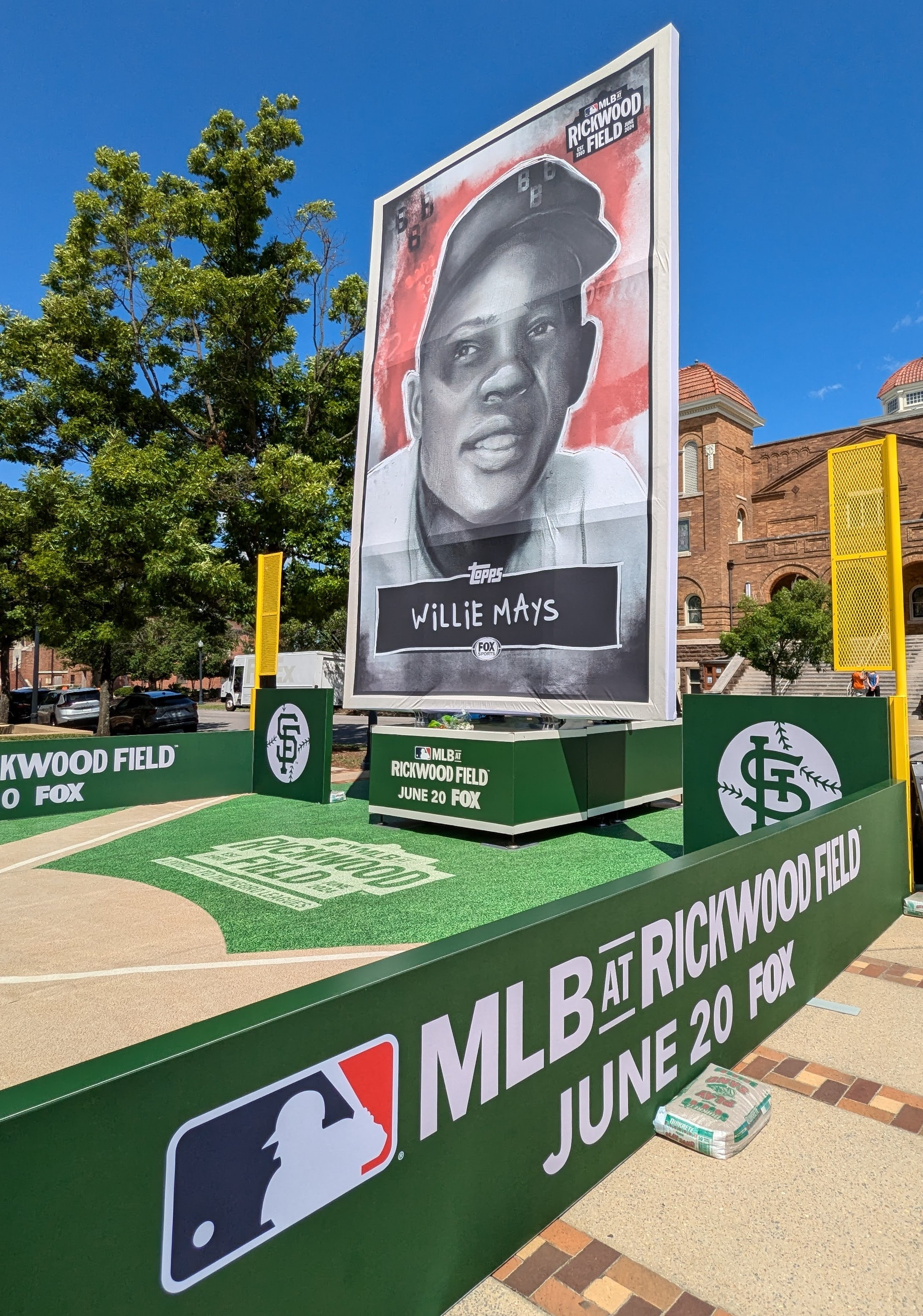
Large Willie Mays Topps baseball card on display outside the Birmingham Civil Rights Institute to promote the game in June 2024.

On June 13, 2023, initial reports revealed that the Giants would play in a Field of Dreams style game, celebrating Willie Mays in Alabama. Due to construction at the MLB at Field of Dreams site, games in 2023 and 2024 were unable to happen. However, MLB decided to shift their marketing into a game to honor Willie Mays, the Negro Leagues, and Juneteenth. The official name for the game was unveiled as MLB at Rickwood Field: A Tribute to the Negro Leagues on August 4, 2023. All living Negro League players were invited to the game (157 total), and 60 were confirmed to attend.

=== Uniforms ===
On June 20, 2023, MLB released a statement indicating that "On-field personnel for both teams will wear period uniforms highlighting the Negro Leagues histories of both St. Louis and San Francisco."

On February 28, 2024, MLB released a teaser poster preview video for the Rickwood Field game. The poster specified the Giants are planning on wearing the San Francisco Sea Lions uniforms and the Cardinals to wear St. Louis Stars uniforms to pay homage to the cities' histories of the Negro Leagues.

On June 12, 2024, despite San Francisco being the designated away team and St. Louis being the designated home team, MLB revealed that the Giants will wear their cream home Sea Lions uniform while St. Louis will wear their road grays. The Giants and Cardinals both wore a "Mays 24" memorial patch on their uniforms during the game. The Giants' uniforms included a "throwback" logo for Chevrolet, the team's uniform advertising sponsor, on the sleeve.

=== Renovations to Rickwood Field ===
In October 2022, MLB executives met with Rickwood Field Chairman and Executive Director, Gerald Watkins to discuss mock-up designs of how to set the ballpark up, how to reconfigure the clubhouses and dugouts, where to put medical areas, how to revamp the concessions and where to build the broadcast center.

Preparatory renovations of the park were scheduled to begin in 2023. Jerry Brewer of The Washington Post wrote, "MLB is tasked with performing tasteful cosmetic surgery on a ballpark known for its old and minimalist charm."

By 2024, Rickwood Field underwent $5 million in renovations which included a new playing surface, a new padded wall (Note: The padding was removed from the wall after the game) that is 10 feet (3.0 m) deeper than the original, and shifting the entire field to the left by 5 feet (1.5 m) to make the field more symmetrical. Other renovations include new dugouts, a modern batter's eye in center field, a digital scoreboard, netting along the foul lines and accessibility upgrades. The distance from home plate to the backstop was shortened during the renovation. Tahoma 31 bermuda grass, and temporary light towers were also installed during the renovation.

=== Willie Mays' death ===
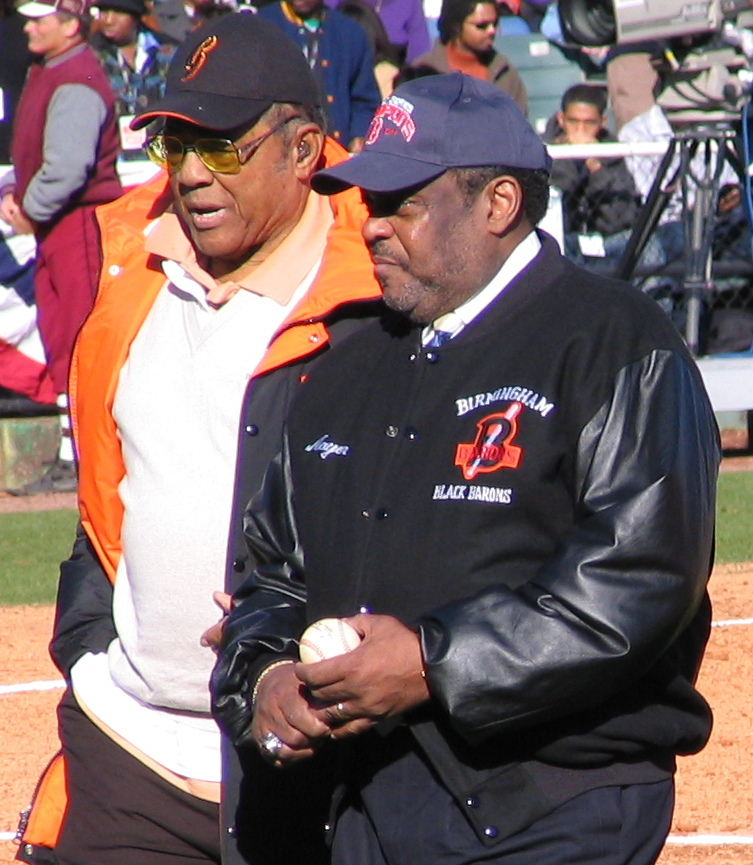
Willie Mays (left) with Bernard Kincaid at Rickwood Field in 2006

On June 17, 2024, Willie Mays made a public statement to the San Francisco Chronicle that he would not be able to attend the game later that week on June 20. Mays died the following day, at the age of 93 of heart failure. MLB commissioner, Rob Manfred released a statement after Mays' death: "Thursday's game at historic Rickwood Field was designed to be a celebration of Willie Mays and his peers. With sadness in our hearts, it will now also serve as a national remembrance of an American who will forever remain on the short list of the most impactful individuals our great game has ever known." On the day of the game, the ballpark groundskeepers painted the number 24 behind home plate, paying homage to Mays.

=== LaMonte Wade Jr. appeal ===
On June 18, Giants first baseman and leadoff hitter, LaMonte Wade Jr.'s appeal to play in the June 20th game was denied by MLB. Wade strained his hamstring on May 27th in a game against the Phillies and was scheduled to miss at least 4 weeks. Since Wade is one of the prominent Black players in MLB and one of three in the Giants' clubhouse, along with pitchers Spencer Bivens and Jordan Hicks, he made it his goal to return for the Rickwood Field game. Giants manager, Bob Melvin indicated the Giants tried to get MLB to reverse its decision, but ultimately was unsuccessful. Melvin said the Giants would prioritize adding him to the roster, even if he were only cleared to be the designated hitter. With the San Francisco Giants able to add a player and carry 27 players on the active roster for Thursday’s Rickwood Field game, the team added utility player Tyler Fitzgerald. That move confirmed the fact that Wade would not play in the Rickwood game. Instead Wade, one of three African American players on the Giants’ roster, remained on the injured list with a hamstring strain. Wade instead brought out the lineup card during the pregame home plate meeting.

=== Umpires ===
Thursday's game at Rickwood was umpired by an all-Black crew for the first time in MLB history. Adrian Johnson served as the crew chief and first-base ump, while Alan Porter called balls and strikes. Malachi Moore oversaw second base and C.B. Bucknor was in charge of third base. Jeremie Rehak managed the replays. MLB has employed just 11 Black umpires in AL/NL history; the five that worked Thursday's game were the only black umpires active that day.

== Rosters ==
San Francisco Sea Lions roster
Starting pitchers: 12 Jordan Hicks; 56 Spencer Howard; 62 Logan Webb; 67 Keaton Winn	Bullpen: 76 Spencer Bivens; 75 Camilo Doval; 64 Sean Hjelle; 77 Luke Jackson; 68 Erik Miller; 73 Randy Rodriguez; 33 Taylor Rogers; 71 Tyler Rogers; 74 Ryan Walker	Catchers: 14 Patrick Bailey; 18 Curt Casali; Infielders: 16 Nick Ahmed; 61 Trenton Brooks; 26 Matt Chapman; 39 Thairo Estrada; 49 Tyler Fitzgerald; 41 Wilmer Flores; 0 Brett Wisely	Outfielders: 8 Michael Conforto; 17 Heliot Ramos; 13 Austin Slater; 5 Mike Yastrzemski; Designated hitters: 2 Jorge Soler	Manager: 6 Bob Melvin; Coaches: 81 Garvin Alston (bullpen); 95 Pat Burrell (hitting); 52 Ryan Christenson (bench); 85 Pedro Guerrero (assistant hitting); 87 J. P. Martinez (assistant pitching); 92 Alyssa Nakken (special assistant); 98 Fernando Perez (video coach); 80 Bryan Price (pitching); 99 Taira Uematsu (assistant coach); –– Justin Viele (hitting); 9 Matt Williams (third base)

St. Louis Stars roster
Starting pitchers: 44 Kyle Gibson; 54 Sonny Gray; 31 Lance Lynn; 39 Miles Mikolas; 53 Andre Pallante	Bullpen: 64 Ryan Fernandez; 56 Ryan Helsley; 47 John King; 27 Andrew Kittredge; 66 Adam Kloffenstein; 62 Kyle Leahy; 52 Matthew Liberatore; 59 JoJo Romero	Catchers: 48 Iván Herrera; 43 Pedro Pagés; Infielders: 28 Nolan Arenado; 35 Brandon Crawford; 15 José Fermín; 46 Paul Goldschmidt; 16 Nolan Gorman; 0 Masyn Winn	Outfielders: 41 Alec Burleson; 3 Dylan Carlson; 33 Brendan Donovan; 11 Victor Scott II; 63 Michael Siani; Designated hitters: 13 Matt Carpenter	Manager: 37 Oliver Marmol; Coaches: 87 Brandon Allen (assistant hitting); 90 Dusty Blake (pitching); 82 Stubby Clapp (first base); 34 Daniel Descalso (bench); 88 Packy Elkins (game planning); 89 Dean Kiekhefer (assistant pitching); 51 Willie McGee (assistant coach); 94 Jamie Pogue (bullpen catcher/assistant coach/bullpen); 74 Julio Rangel (assistant pitching/bullpen); 76 Kleininger Teran (bullpen catcher); 49 Turner Ward (hitting); 75 Ron 'Pop' Warner (third base)

== Pregame ==
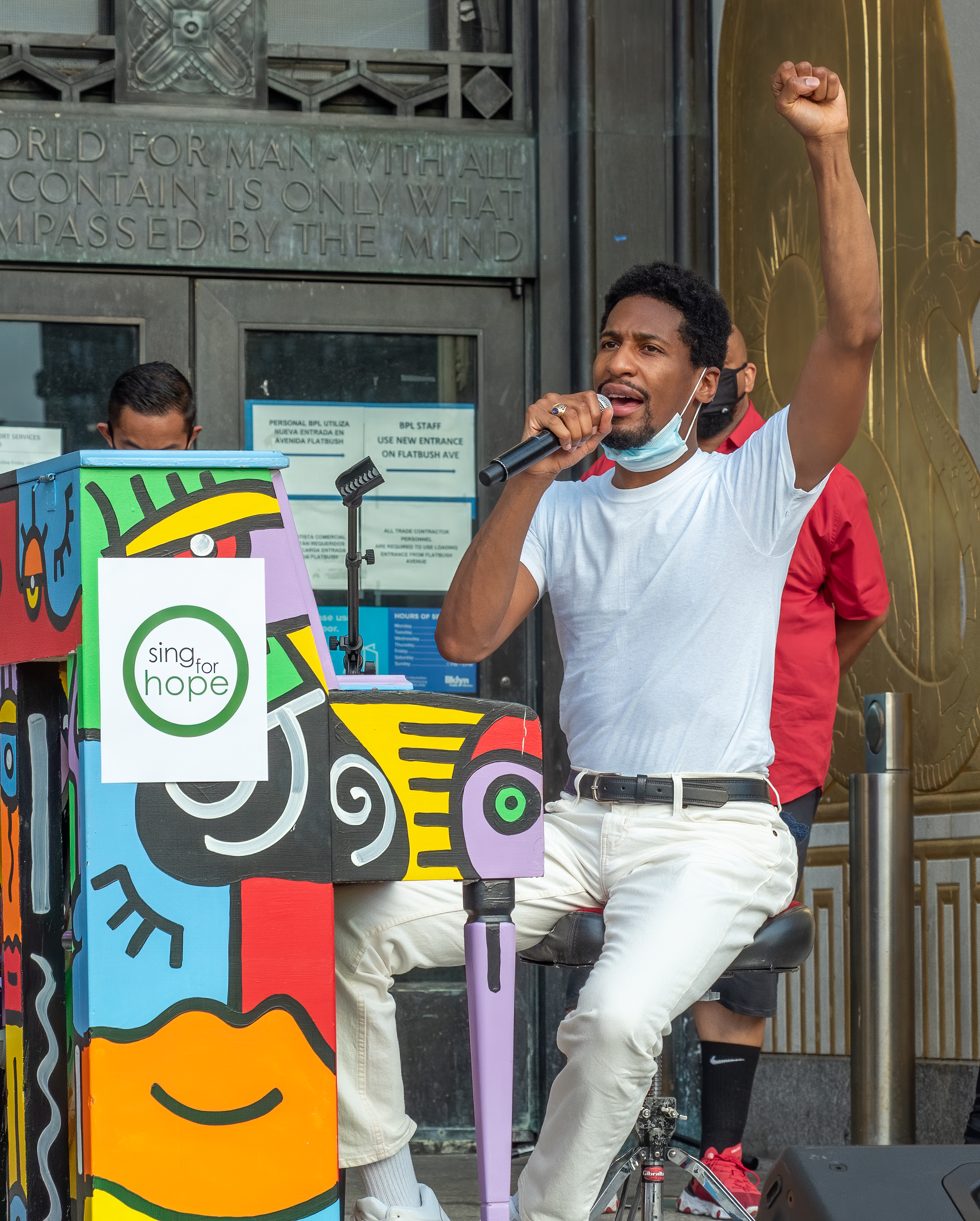
Jon Batiste in Brooklyn on Juneteenth 2020

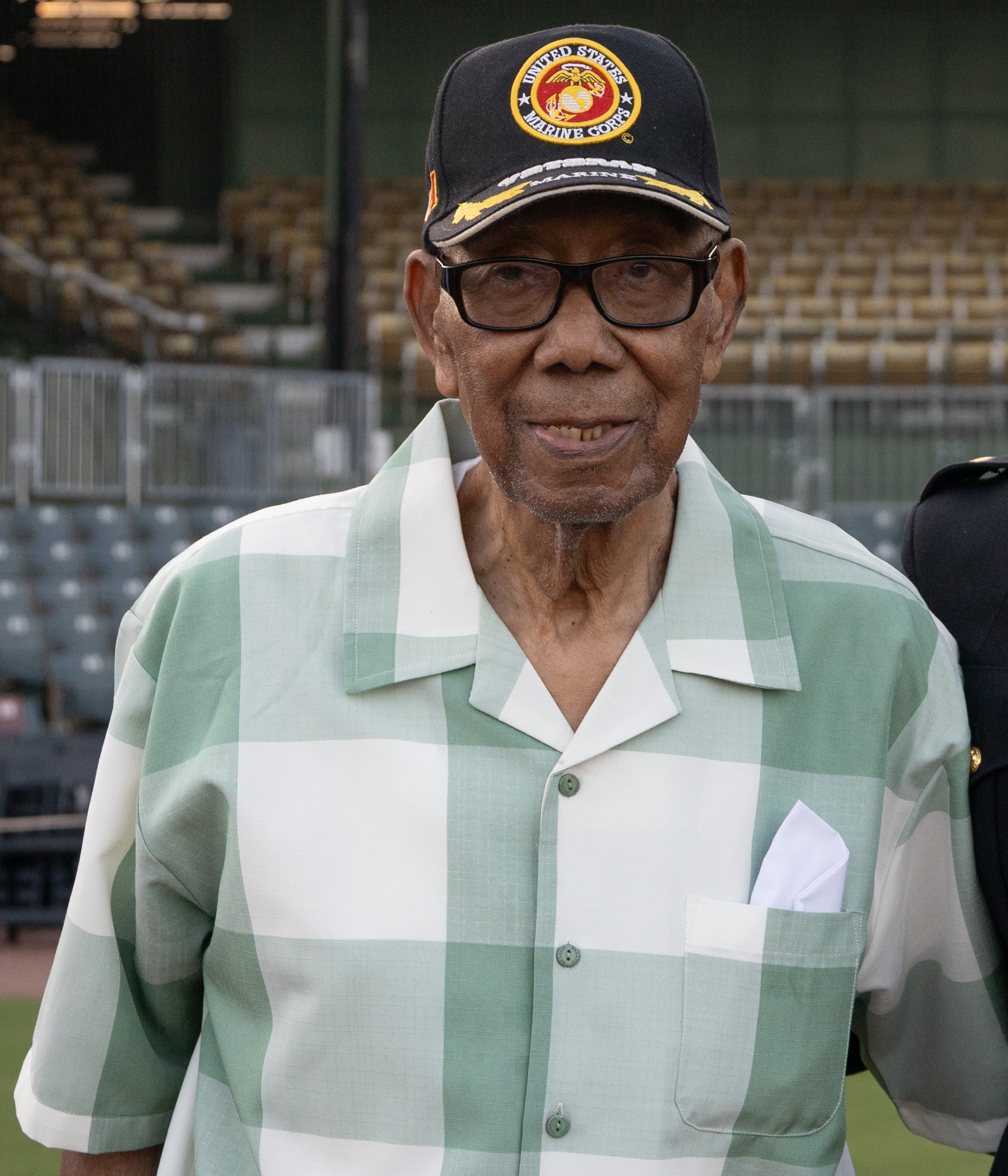
Rev. William Greason celebrating his 100th Birthday at Rickwood Field

=== Jon Batiste ===
Musical artist Jon Batiste strummed a guitar while dancing on a wooden stage near home plate to kick off the pregame ceremonies with his band which included Brittney Spencer, Willie Jones, and C.S. Armstrong. They sang the national anthem and played a mix of instruments to pay homage to the period. Four F-35A fighter jets from the Alabama National Guard's 187th Fighter Wing performed a flyover during the anthem.

=== Negro League' Players Ceremony ===
Fans stood as the Cardinals and Giants led former Negro Leaguers were helped to the field for a pregame ceremony. They sat along the first and third base lines as Batiste and company finished their performance. Next, a video of the late, great Willie Mays played on the video board. Then Mays' son, Michael, came out onto the field alongside Barry Bonds and Ken Griffey Jr. Mays, shouted to the Rickwood Field crowd, "Birmingham, I've been telling y'all if there's any way on earth my father could come down here, that he would," Mays said in a short speech. "Well he found another way. He already stands at your feet. Let him hear you, he's listening." The crowd then erupted in a standing ovation and began to chant "Will-ie! Will-ie!" Chicago Cubs and Wrigley Field PA announcer Jeremiah Paprocki was the PA announcer for the game.

=== Ceremonial first pitch ===
99-year-old WWII veteran, former Black Baron and Cardinal, Bill Greason threw out the ceremonial first pitch. Greason played with Mays on the Black Barons and lived across the street from Martin Luther King Jr., and is the oldest living Negro league ballplayer.

== Game ==
=== Scheduling ===
The game was the first MLB regular season game in the state of Alabama. It was played on a Thursday and was the first game of a three-game series followed by an off-day and two games at Busch Stadium in St. Louis on Saturday and Sunday.

=== Lineups ===
No.	Player	Pos.
San Francisco
0	Brett Wisely	2B
17	Heliot Ramos	CF
14	Patrick Bailey	C
26	Matt Chapman	3B
8	Michael Conforto	LF
2	Jorge Soler	DH
41	Wilmer Flores	1B
5	Mike Yastrzemski	RF
16	Nick Ahmed	SS
Starting pitcher
67	Keaton Winn	

No.	Player	Pos.
St. Louis
0	Masyn Winn	SS
41	Alec Burleson	RF
46	Paul Goldschmidt	1B
16	Nolan Gorman	2B
33	Brendan Donovan	LF
13	Matt Carpenter	DH
35	Brandon Crawford	3B
43	Pedro Pagés	C
63	Michael Siani	CF
Starting pitcher
53	Andre Pallante	

=== Recap ===
In the first inning, San Francisco batter Matt Chapman grounded out to Brandon Crawford, a longtime Giants shortstop who was playing his first game of his professional career at third base for the Cardinals, with whom he had signed before the season. In the bottom half of the first, The Cardinals kicked off the scoring when Nolan Gorman hit a sacrifice fly to plate Masyn Winn. The next batter, Brendan Donovan, hit a two run homer to right field.

In the top of the third, Giants center fielder Heliot Ramos responded with a three-run opposite field home run just over the right field wall. In the bottom half of the inning, Gorman hit another sacrifice fly to score Winn, then Alec Burleson scored on a wild pitch from Giants reliever Randy Rodríguez.

In the top of the fifth inning, to commemorate the 70th anniversary of 'The Catch', Fox replicated a 1954 broadcast by making the video feed black and white, making the microphone audio scratchy, adding a projector sound in the background, and using identical angles to the 1954 World Series broadcast. The inning showed a split screen of the pitcher and runner at first, as well as 1950s-style camera angles for a ground ball Heliot Ramos hit that resulted in a double play. In the bottom half of the fifth, Brendan Donovan singled to center to score Alec Burleson.

In between the fifth and the sixth innings, MLB held a brief ceremony for their Stand Up to Cancer program, aimed to raise awareness and find cures for cancer patients. In the top half of the sixth inning, Wilmer Flores singled to center to score Matt Chapman and move Jorge Soler to third. Two batters later, Nick Ahmed hit a sac-fly to left to score Soler to make the score 6–5. The bullpens dealt throughout the rest of the game, including Adam Kloffenstein making his Major League Baseball debut, and Ryan Helsley shut the door on the Giants to earn the save. Cardinals left fielder Brendan Donovan, who grew up in Enterprise, Alabama, led the Cardinals offense, going three-for-four with a home run and three RBIs. Andre Pallante earned himself the win, and Keaton Winn was credited with the loss.

=== Line score ===
June 20, 2024 6:30 p.m. CDT (7:30 p.m. EDT) at Rickwood Field
Team	1	2	3	4	5	6	7	8	9	R	H	E
San Francisco	0	0	3	0	0	2	0	0	0	5	11	0
St. Louis	3	0	2	0	1	0	0	0	×	6	7	0
WP: Andre Pallante (3–3) LP: Keaton Winn (3–8) Sv: Ryan Helsley (25); Home runs: SF: Heliot Ramos (10); STL: Brendan Donovan (7); Attendance: 8,332 Time: 2:53; Umpires: Alan Porter, Adrian Johnson, Malachi Moore, C. B. Bucknor; Replay official: Jeremie Rehak

=== Box score ===
Giants	AB	R	H	RBI	BB	SO	AVG
Brett Wisely, 2B	4	1	1	0	1	0	.296
Heliot Ramos, CF	5	1	1	1	0	2	.307
Patrick Bailey, C	5	0	4	0	0	0	.299
Matt Chapman, 3B	5	1	1	0	0	2	.227
Michael Conforto, LF	4	0	0	0	0	2	.227
Jorge Soler, DH	3	1	1	0	1	1	.226
Wilmer Flores, 1B	4	0	1	1	0	0	.212
Mike Yastrzemski, RF	1	1	1	0	0	0	.224
Austin Slater, PH–RF	2	0	1	0	1	0	.227
Nick Ahmed, SS	2	0	0	1	0	1	.246
Trenton Brooks, PH	0	0	0	0	1	0	.130
Tyler Fitzgerald, PR	0	0	0	0	0	0	.273

Pitching

Giants	IP	H	R	ER	BB	SO	HR	ERA
Keaton Winn (L)	2.2	5	5	5	2	2	1	7.16
Randy Rodríguez	2	1	1	1	1	4	0	5.00
Taylor Rogers	1.1	1	0	0	0	1	0	2.05
Ryan Walker	1	0	0	0	0	2	0	2.31
Tyler Rogers	1	0	0	0	0	2	0	3.03

Cardinals	AB	R	H	RBI	BB	SO	AVG
Masyn Winn, SS	3	2	1	0	1	1	.293
Alec Burleson, RF	3	3	2	0	0	0	.273
Victor Scott II, LF	0	0	0	0	0	0	.085
Paul Goldschmidt, 1B	4	0	1	0	0	2	.231
Nolan Gorman, 2B	2	0	0	2	0	1	.200
Brendan Donovan, LF–3B	4	1	3	3	0	1	.258
Matt Carpenter, DH	2	0	0	0	0	1	.222
Jose Fermin, PH–DH	2	0	0	0	0	1	.167
Brandon Crawford, 3B	1	0	0	0	1	1	.186
Dylan Carlson, PH–LF–RF	1	0	0	0	0	0	.165
Pedro Pagés, C	3	0	0	0	0	1	.120
Michael Siani, CF	3	0	0	0	0	2	.209

Pitching

Cardinals	IP	H	R	ER	BB	SO	HR	ERA
Andre Pallante (W)	5.1	7	5	5	3	5	1	5.23
Andrew Kittredge	1	2	0	0	0	0	0	3.18
John King	0.2	1	0	0	0	1	0	2.39
Adam Kloffenstein	1	0	0	0	0	0	0	0.00
Ryan Helsley (S)	1	1	0	0	1	2	0	2.45

== MiLB at Rickwood Field ==
MiLB at Rickwood Field: A Tribute to the Negro Leagues
	1	2	3	4	5	6	7	8	9	R	H	E
Montgomery Biscuits (Note: Playing as the Montgomery Grey Sox)	2	3	0	0	0	0	0	0	1	6	9	0
Birmingham Barons (Note: Playing as the Birmingham Black Barons)	0	0	2	0	0	0	2	0	1	5	15	0
- Date: June 18, 2024
- Venue: Rickwood Field
- City: Birmingham, Alabama
- Managers: Kevin Boles (Montgomery Biscuits (Note: Playing as the Montgomery Grey Sox)); Sergio Santos (Birmingham Barons (Note: Playing as the Birmingham Black Barons))
- Umpires: HP: Elliott Melton; 1B: Jaylen Goodman; 3B: Tre Jester
- Attendance: 7,866
- Ceremonial first pitch: 6:12 CDT
- Television: MLB Network
- TV announcers: Rich Waltz (play-by-play); Chris Young (analyst); Roy Wood Jr. (reporter)

Along with the June 20 game between the Giants and Cardinals, the Montgomery Biscuits (Tampa Bay Rays affiliate) and the Birmingham Barons (Chicago White Sox affiliate) of Minor League Baseball's Double-A Southern League played a game at Rickwood Field on June 18. The visiting Biscuits wore Montgomery Gray Sox road uniforms while the home Barons wore Birmingham Black Barons home uniforms.

In the top of the 7th inning, Rich Waltz passed along the news that all-time great Willie Mays died at the age of 93. The fans in the stadium found out about Mays' passing as the Rickwood Field PA announcer addressed the crowd in between the 7th and 8th inning. The fans gave Mays a standing ovation shortly after to honor his life and legacy.

African-American Rays top 10 prospect and Biscuits center fielder, Chandler Simpson tweaked his calf trying to make a play in the bottom of the seventh inning and had exited the game with the team trainer. He then found out about the passing of Mays. Postgame, Simpson stated, “He was definitely here in spirit throughout the whole game... But everybody gave thanks, and then everybody was appreciative of him and all the greats that came before me.” The Grey Sox beat the Black Barons by a score of 6–5.

== See also ==
- List of neutral site regular season Major League Baseball games played in the United States and Canada
