= Mike Estabrook (umpire) =

American baseball umpire (born 1976)

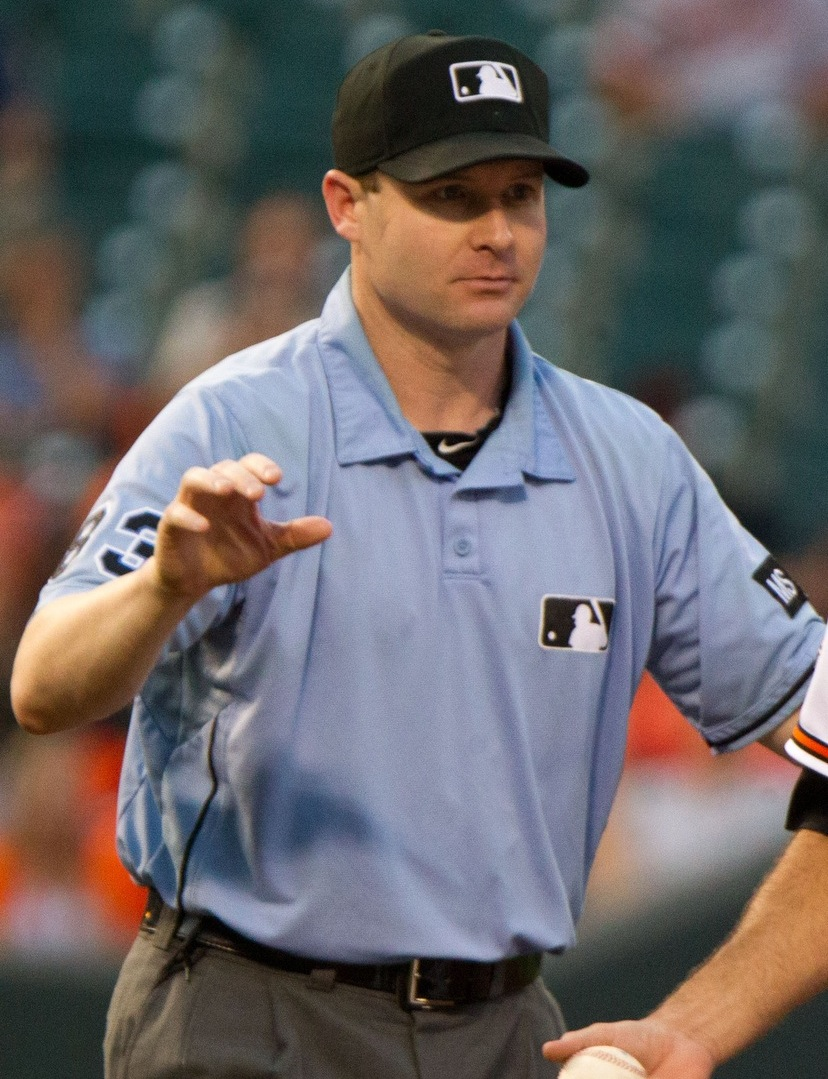
- Estabrook in 2012

MLB – No. 83
- Umpire
- Born: July 28, 1976 (age 50); Daytona Beach, Florida, U.S.

MLB debut
- May 7, 2006

Crew information
- Umpiring crew: O
- Crew members: #72 Alfonso Márquez (crew chief); #16 Lance Barrett; #83 Mike Estabrook; #44 Malachi Moore

Career highlights and awards
- Special Assignments: All-Star Games (2017); Wild Card Game/Series (2015, 2023, 2024); Division Series (2020, 2021, 2025, 2026); Championship Series (2024); World Baseball Classic (2023); Field of Dreams Game (2021); MLB Little League Classic (2022)

Michael Joseph Estabrook (born July 28, 1976) is an American Major League Baseball umpire. He made his first umpiring appearance at the Major League level on May 7, 2006. Estabrook wears uniform number 83. It was announced on January 14, 2014, that Estabrook was added to the full-time MLB Umpire staff.

== Umpiring career ==
In 2010, Estabrook ejected Kansas City Royals manager Ned Yost from a game after Estabrook had confronted Royals catcher Jason Kendall. Later, Yost was quoted as saying, "I'll never let an umpire show up one of my players, and that's exactly what he was doing." Kendall stated, "He got in my face, and it was unprofessional what he did."

Estabrook was officially hired to the full-time MLB staff prior to the 2014 season.

Estabrook worked his first career MLB Playoff game in left field on October 7, 2015, between the Chicago Cubs and the Pittsburgh Pirates.

Estabrook is known for wearing a helmet with a traditional face mask behind home plate instead of an umpire cap, being one of the first full-time umpires to wear a helmet.

== See also ==
- List of Major League Baseball umpires (disambiguation)
