= Lance Barrett =

American baseball umpire (born 1984)

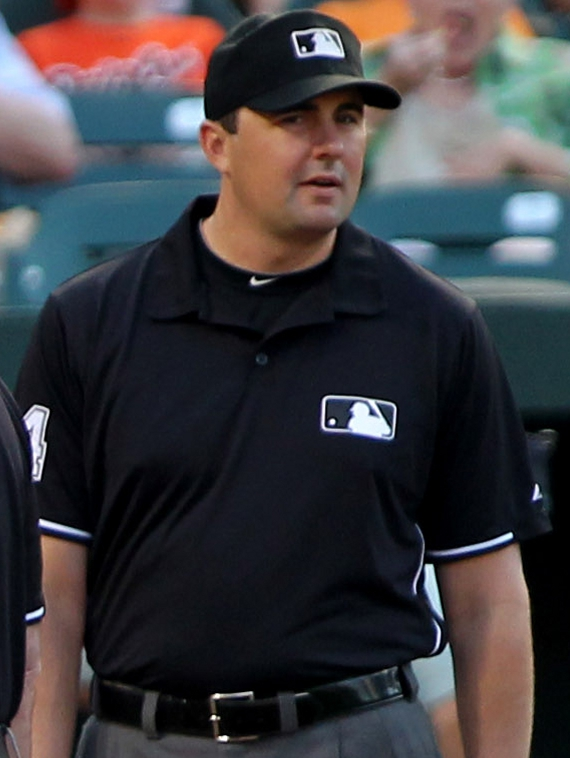
- Barrett in 2011

MLB – No. 16
- Umpire
- Born: October 3, 1984 (age 41); Fort Worth, Texas, U.S.

MLB debut
- October 1, 2010

Crew information
- Umpiring crew: O
- Crew members: #72 Alfonso Márquez (crew chief); #16 Lance Barrett; #83 Mike Estabrook; #44 Malachi Moore

Career highlights and awards
- Special assignments: League Championship Series (2022); Division Series (2020, 2021, 2023, 2024, 2026); Wild Card Games/Series (2019, 2020, 2022, 2025); All-Star Games (2021)

Lance Cole Barrett (born October 3, 1984) is an American umpire in Major League Baseball (MLB). He wore number 94 but changed to 16 starting in the 2020 season. Barrett became a minor league umpire in 2003 and was hired to the MLB staff prior to the 2014 season.

== Biography ==
Barrett went to Crowley High School in Crowley, Texas. He attended the Jim Evans Academy of Professional Umpiring immediately after high school. He entered the minor leagues in 2003 and made his MLB debut on October 1, 2010. Barrett's first career ejection came on April 16, 2012, when he threw out Chicago White Sox pitching coach Don Cooper.

Barrett worked all four games on June 13–16, 2019, between the San Diego Padres and the Colorado Rockies in which both teams set a major league record for most runs in a four-game series (92). The previous record was 88, set in 1929.

Barrett worked his first career MLB postseason game in left field on October 2, 2019, serving in the 2019 American League Wild Card Game between the Tampa Bay Rays and the Oakland Athletics.

Barrett was the third base umpire for the Baltimore Orioles vs Seattle Mariners game on May 5, 2021, when John Means threw a no-hitter facing the minimum 27 batters.

Barrett was the second base umpire for the Atlanta Braves vs Philadelphia Phillies game on August 28, 2025, in which Kyle Schwarber hit four homeruns for the 21st time in MLB history.

== See also ==
- List of Major League Baseball umpires (disambiguation)
