= Adrian Johnson (umpire) =

American baseball umpire (born 1975)

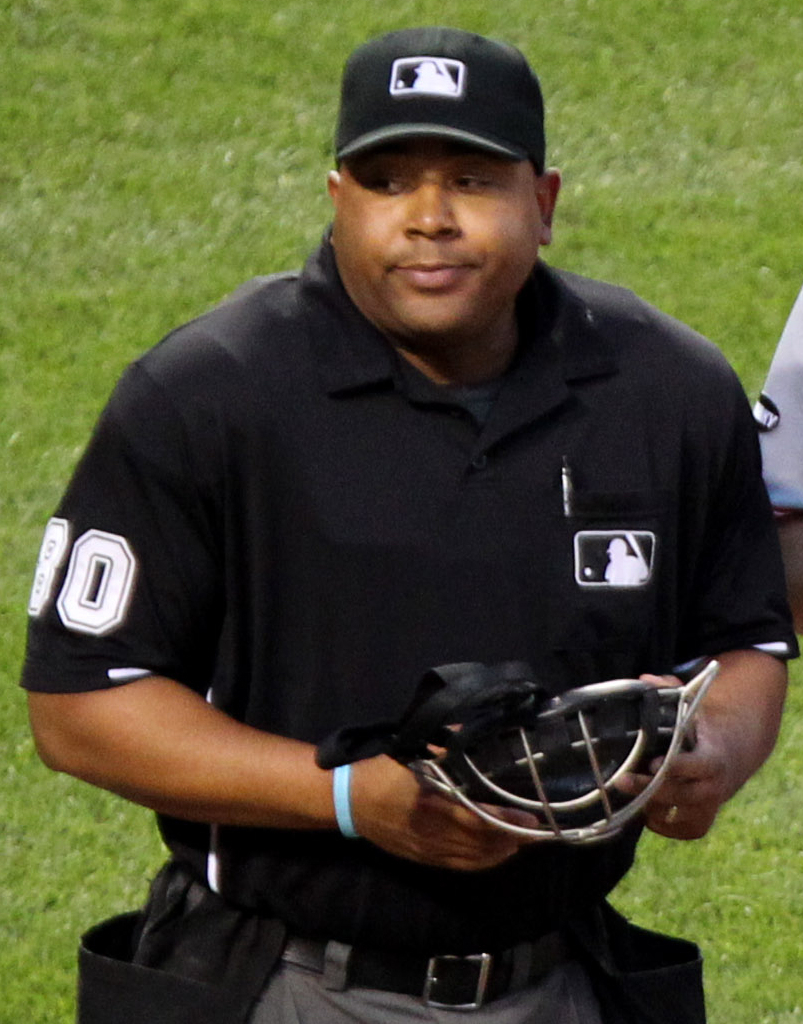
- Johnson in 2011

MLB – No. 80
- Umpire
- Born: May 25, 1975 (age 51); Houston, Texas, U.S.

MLB debut
- April 19, 2006

Crew information
- Umpiring crew: L
- Crew members: #80 Adrian Johnson (crew chief); #81 Quinn Wolcott; #18 Ramon De Jesus; #57 Paul Clemons

Career highlights and awards
- Special assignments: World Series (2025); League Championship Series (2022); Division Series (2017, 2018, 2019, 2020, 2024, 2025); Wild Card Games/Series (2020, 2022, 2023); All-Star Game (2016); World Baseball Classic (2006); Field of Dreams Game (2022); Rickwood Field Game (2024)

Adrian Andre Johnson (born May 25, 1975) is an American umpire in Major League Baseball. He wears uniform number 80.

== Career ==
Born in Houston – where he still resides – Johnson worked in the Gulf Coast League, Pioneer League, South Atlantic League, Florida State League, Eastern League and International League before being called up to MLB in 2006. He also officiated in the 2006 World Baseball Classic. Johnson was named to the full-time Major League staff prior to the 2010 season. He was promoted to crew chief in 2023.

== Notable games ==
Johnson was the home plate umpire for Edwin Jackson's no-hitter on June 25, 2010.

He was the home plate umpire when the New York Yankees hit a record three grand slams against the Oakland Athletics on August 25, 2011.

He was at third base on June 1, 2012, when Johan Santana no-hit the St. Louis Cardinals, making a controversial "foul ball" ruling over a hard ground ball hit by Carlos Beltrán in the sixth inning.

On July 2, 2013, Johnson was the home plate umpire when Homer Bailey of the Cincinnati Reds pitched a no-hitter against the San Francisco Giants at Great American Ball Park.

Johnson served as the left field umpire in the 2016 MLB All-Star Game in San Diego.

Johnson worked in his first postseason in 2017, serving as an umpire during the 2017 American League Division Series.

== See also ==
- List of Major League Baseball umpires (disambiguation)
