= San Francisco Sea Lions =

Baseball team

Information
- League: West Coast Negro Baseball League (1946)
- Location: San Francisco, California
- Established: 1946
- Disbanded: 1946

The San Francisco Sea Lions were a Negro league baseball team in the West Coast Negro Baseball League, based in San Francisco, California, in 1946. Following the collapse of the league, the Sea Lions played as an independent barnstorming team.

== History ==
Following the 1946 season, the Sea Lions became independent. In 1949, the Sea Lions were engaged in tour of Western Canada, when money problems led to seven players leaving the team for the integrated Buchanan (Saskatchewan) All-Stars.

== In modern culture ==
The San Francisco Giants have paid homage to the Sea Lions by recreating and wearing their jerseys five times. The Giants wore a road jersey in 2014, and a home jersey once a season from 2021–2024. The Giants record is 2–3 in the Sea Lions uniforms. The San Jose Sea Lions of the Professional Women's Hockey League chose the name to honor Toni Stone, the first woman to play baseball regularly in a major men’s professional league who briefly played for the team.

=== San Francisco Giants Games Wearing Sea Lions Uniforms ===
Date	Home/Away	Uniform Color	Opponent	Score	Stadium	City	Notes/Ref.
May 3, 2014	Away	Gray	Atlanta Braves (Note: Playing as the Atlanta Black Crackers)	3–1	Turner Field	Atlanta, GA	(Note: On May 3, 2014, the Giants wore the Sea Lions road jerseys against the Atlanta Braves in a regular season game at Turner Field. The Braves wore a Negro leagues throwback uniform for the heritage game which were Atlanta Black Crackers uniforms.)
June 19, 2021	Home	Cream	Philadelphia Phillies	6–13	Oracle Park	San Francisco, CA	(Note: On June 19, 2021, as part of their celebration honoring Juneteenth, the Giants wore replica uniforms of the San Francisco Sea Lions against the Phillies. The jerseys were intended to commemorate the 75th anniversary of the team that played in the West Coast Negro Baseball Association league during the 1940s. During a pre-game ceremony, the family of Toni Stone, the first female known to play on a professional men's baseball team when she played for the Sea Lions, was given a jersey honoring her legacy.)
July 17, 2022	Home	Cream	Milwaukee Brewers	9–5	Oracle Park	San Francisco, CA	(Note: On July 17 of 2022, the Giants honored African American Heritage Day at a game against the Milwaukee Brewers at Oracle Park by wearing Sea Lions uniforms and giving away Sea Lions caps to fans in attendance.)
August 26, 2023	Home	Cream	Atlanta Braves	7–3	Oracle Park	San Francisco, CA	(Note: On August 26, 2023, the Giants and Oracle Park celebrated African American Heritage Day by wearing the Sea Lions uniforms during a game against the Atlanta Braves.)
June 20, 2024	Away	Cream	St. Louis Cardinals (Note: Playing as the St. Louis Stars)	5–6	Rickwood Field	Birmingham, AL	(Note: On June 20, 2024, the Giants and Cardinals played at Rickwood Field. The Giants wore the Sea Lions home uniforms despite being the designated away team.)

== See also ==
- Toni Stone
- MLB at Rickwood Field
