= Adam Kloffenstein =

American baseball player (born 2000)

Free agent
- Pitcher
- Born: August 25, 2000 (age 26); Magnolia, Texas, U.S.
- Bats: Right Throws: Right

MLB debut
- June 20, 2024, for the St. Louis Cardinals

MLB statistics (through 2024 season)
- Win–loss record: 0–0
- Earned run average: 0.00
- Strikeouts: 0
- Stats at Baseball Reference

Teams
- St. Louis Cardinals (2024)

Adam Kloffenstein (born August 25, 2000) is an American professional baseball pitcher who is a free agent. He has previously played in Major League Baseball (MLB) for St. Louis Cardinals. He made his MLB debut in 2024.

== Career ==
Kloffenstein attended Magnolia High School in Magnolia, Texas.

=== Toronto Blue Jays ===
Kloffenstein was drafted in the third round, with the 88th overall selection, of the 2018 Major League Baseball draft by the Toronto Blue Jays, and signed on June 12 for a $2.45 million signing bonus. Kloffenstein was assigned to the Rookie-level Gulf Coast League Blue Jays with former Magnolia teammate Jordan Groshans. He made his professional debut on August 20 and pitched one scoreless inning. In total for his 2018 season, Kloffenstein pitched two scoreless innings. In 2019, he was promoted to the Low–A Vancouver Canadians where he started 13 games, going 4–4 and recording a 2.24 ERA. Kloffenstein did not play in a game in 2020 due to the cancellation of the minor league season because of the COVID-19 pandemic.

He returned to Vancouver in 2021, making 23 starts and struggling to a 7–7 record and 6.22 ERA with 107 strikeouts across 101 1/3 innings pitched. Kloffenstein split the 2022 campaign between Vancouver and the Double–A New Hampshire Fisher Cats, accumulating a 5.54 ERA with 118 strikeouts across 25 total games (24 starts). He made 17 starts for New Hampshire to begin the 2023 season, compiling a 5–5 record and 3.24 ERA with 105 strikeouts across 89 innings.

=== St. Louis Cardinals ===
On July 30, 2023, the Blue Jays traded Kloffenstein and Sem Robberse to the St. Louis Cardinals in exchange for pitcher Jordan Hicks. In 9 games (8 starts) for the Triple–A Memphis Redbirds, he recorded a 3.00 ERA with 35 strikeouts across 39 innings. On November 14, the Cardinals added Kloffenstein to their 40-man roster to protect him from the Rule 5 draft.

Kloffenstein was optioned to the Triple–A Memphis Redbirds to begin the 2024 season. In 14 starts prior to his call–up, he compiled a 4–4 record and 3.97 ERA with 68 strikeouts. On June 20, 2024, Kloffenstein was promoted to the major leagues for the first time. He made his debut that day, throwing a perfect inning against the San Francisco Giants as part of the MLB at Rickwood Field game. On November 22, the Cardinals non–tendered Kloffenstein, making him a free agent.

=== Toronto Blue Jays (second stint) ===
On January 28, 2025, Kloffenstein signed a minor league contract with the Toronto Blue Jays. He made 21 appearances (18 starts) split between the rookie-level Florida Complex League Blue Jays, Single-A Dunedin Blue Jays, and Triple-A Buffalo Bisons, accumulating a 2-9 record and 5.66 ERA with 103 strikeouts and one save across 90 2/3 innings pitched. Kloffenstein elected free agency following the season on November 6.

=== New York Yankees ===
On December 19, 2025, Kloffenstein signed a minor league contract with the New York Yankees. In 26 games (24 starts) with Triple-A Scranton/Wilkes-Barre Railriders he threw 123.1 innings going 5-11 with a 4.89 ERA and 111 strikeouts. He elected free agency on November 2.
