= Laz Díaz =

American baseball umpire (born 1963)

- Díaz at Busch Stadium in 2025
- Umpire
- Born: March 29, 1963 (age 63); Miami, Florida, U.S.

MLB debut
- June 23, 1995

Last MLB appearance
- September 27, 2026
- Stats at Baseball Reference

Career highlights and awards
- Special Assignments: World Series (2007, 2017, 2020); League Championship Series (2009, 2015, 2016, 2021); Division Series (2002, 2006, 2007, 2013, 2014, 2017, 2020); Wild Card Games/Series (2020, 2021, 2022); All-Star Games (2000, 2010); World Baseball Classic (2009, 2023); Field of Dreams Game (2021)

Lazaro Antonio Díaz Sr. (born March 29, 1963) is an American former umpire in Major League Baseball. He joined the American League's full-time staff in 1999, and has worked throughout both major leagues since 2000. Díaz was promoted to crew chief for the 2022 season, becoming the second full time Latino crew chief, after Alfonso Marquez.

== Early life and amateur career ==
Díaz was born in 1963 in Florida to a father and mother who had immigrated from Cuba in 1961 and 1962 respectively. He played baseball at Miami Carol City Senior High School, from which he graduated in 1982. He was a high school teammate of Danny Tartabull. After high school, he played college baseball at Florida Memorial College.

== Career ==
Prior to beginning his professional umpiring career, Díaz played one minor league season in the Minnesota Twins organization as an outfielder and a shortstop. He split the 1984 season between the Elizabethton and Kenosha Twins, and the Visalia Oaks. After being released at the end of the season, Díaz made two more attempts at being signed by a major league team. He tried out for the St Louis Cardinals in 1986, and was a spring training invitee for the New York Yankees in 1987 before ending his playing career.

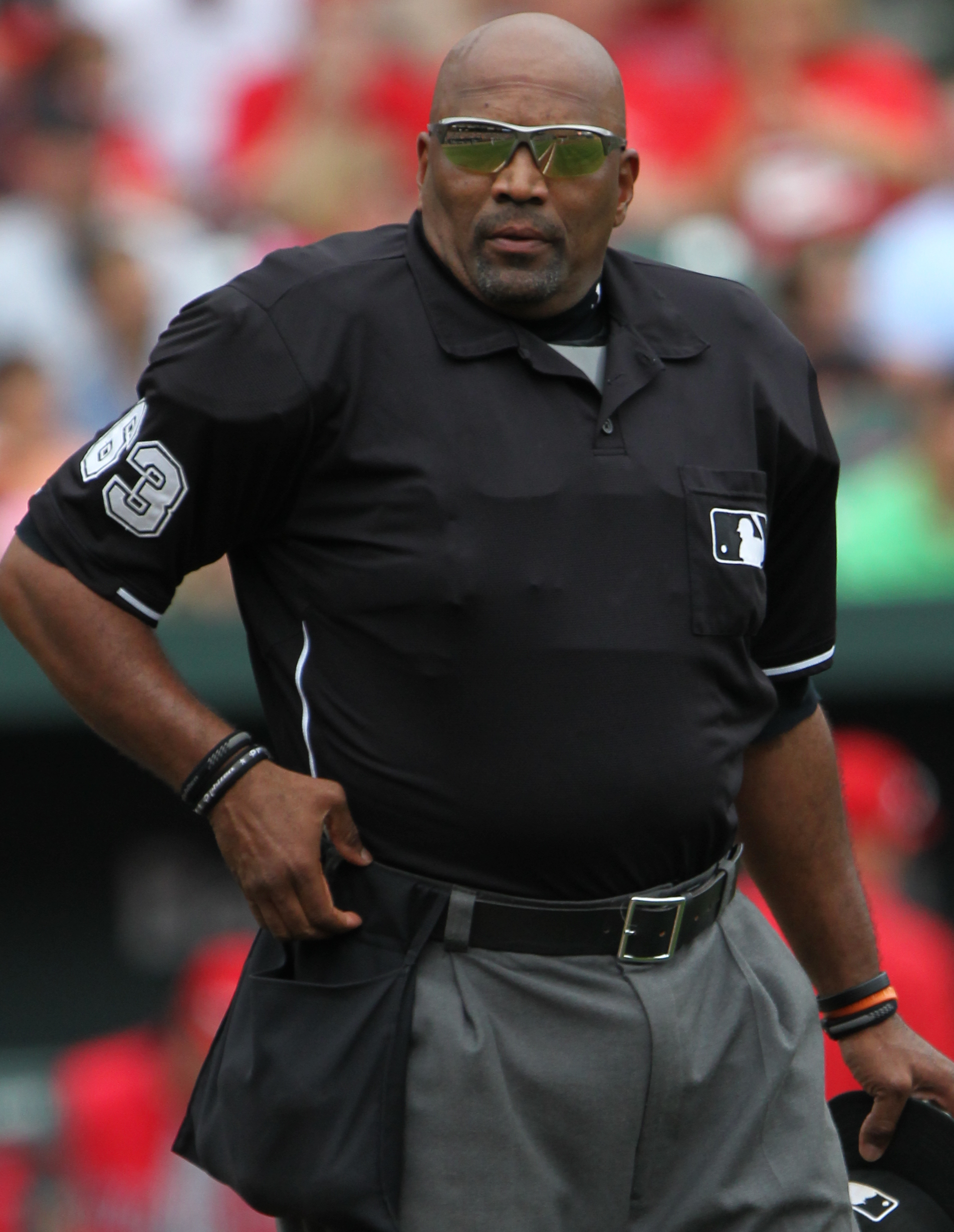
Díaz in 2011

Díaz also previously served in the Marine Corps Reserves.

Following the conclusion of his brief professional baseball career, Díaz began umpiring and attended the Harry Wendelstedt Umpire School in 1991. He worked his way up to the International League for the 1995 season. Díaz was one of the 22 umpires promoted to the major leagues in the wake of the 1999 Major League Umpires Association mass resignation. Díaz wears number 63, a reference to his birth year of 1963. Díaz was attacked by an intoxicated fan while umpiring first base in a game at Comiskey Park in April 2003. The fan, Eric Dybas, a self-described Cubs fan, had attended a game at Wrigley Field earlier in the day and had been drinking all day. Laz stifled the attack, and the fan was later sentenced to up to 180 days in jail and one month of probation for aggravated battery.

Díaz was the second base umpire when Barry Bonds broke Hank Aaron's career home run record. On July 23, 2009, Díaz was the third base umpire for Mark Buehrle's perfect game.

He has worked the World Series in 2007, 2017 and 2020, the American League Championship Series in 2009, 2015, 2016, and 2021, the Division Series in 2002, 2006, 2007, 2013, 2014, 2017 and 2020 and the Wild Card in 2020, 2021 and 2022. He also umpired the All-Star Game in 2000 and 2010.

Díaz is featured in Pepsi commercials with the Detroit Tigers' Johnny Damon, the Minnesota Twins' Joe Mauer and broadcaster Gary Thorne.

On March 7, 2010, Díaz was inducted to the Cuban Hall of Fame.

During a game on May 30, 2012, Díaz got into an unusual argument with New York Yankees catcher Russell Martin. According to Martin, Díaz punished the catcher for disputing the strike zone by not letting him throw new baseballs out to the pitcher (a preference of Martin's) and claiming that this ability had to be "earned". MLB Executive VP for Baseball Operations Joe Torre spoke to Díaz and Martin about the incident, but Martin said he did not expect any disciplinary action for either man.

MLB selected Diaz to officiate its 2014 Opening Series at the Sydney Cricket Ground in Sydney, Australia, during March 20–23, 2014.

On July 5, 2026, USA Today's Bob Nightengale reported that Diaz was one of seven umpires who had accepted a buyout from Major League Baseball to retire after the 2026 season.

On September 27, 2026, Díaz officiated his last game, being the Pittsburgh Pirates vs. the Detroit Tigers.

== See also ==
- List of Major League Baseball umpires (disambiguation)
