= Malachi Moore (umpire) =

American baseball umpire (born 1990)

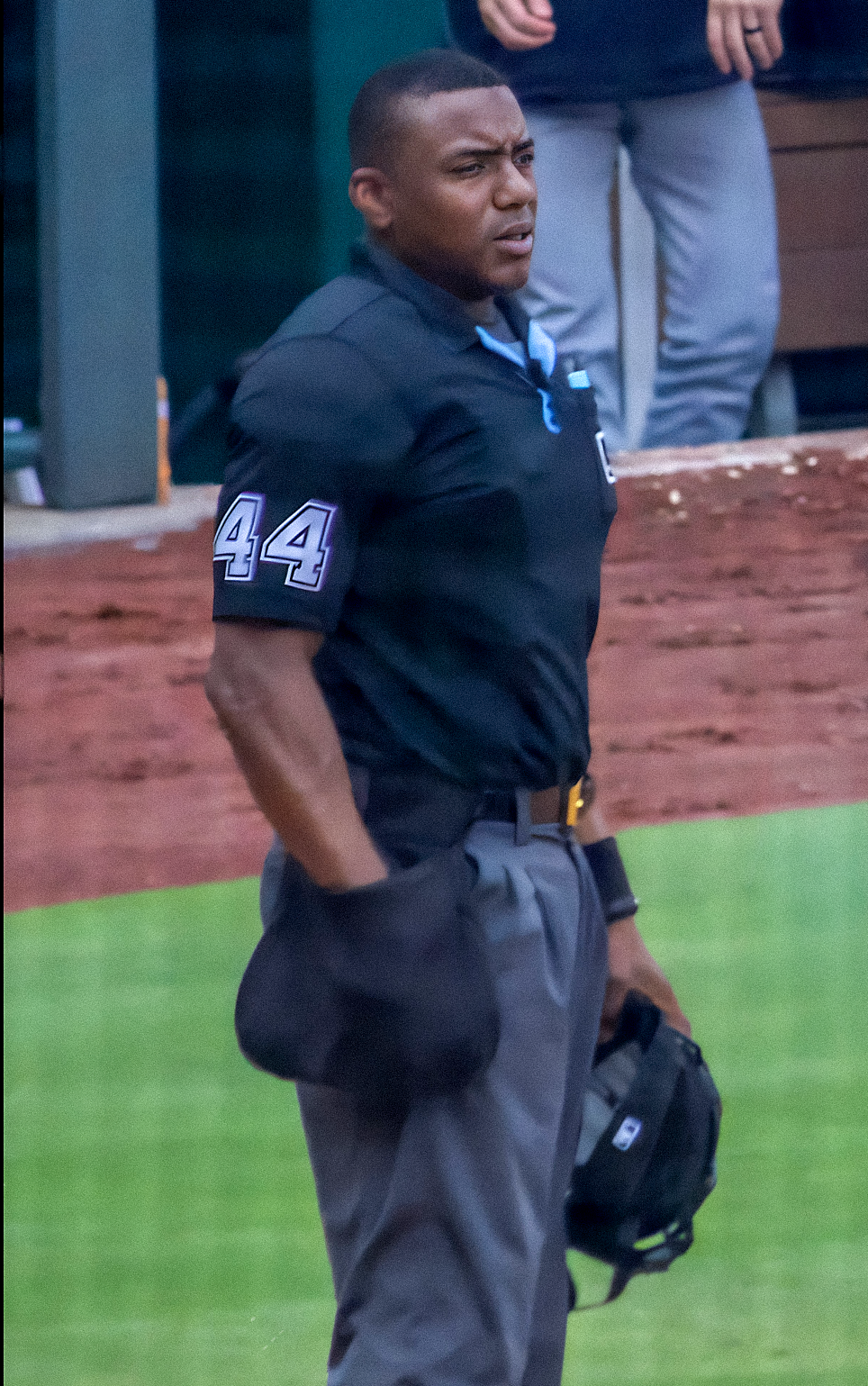
- Moore in 2025

MLB – No. 44
- Umpire
- Born: June 14, 1990 (age 36); Compton, California, US

MLB debut
- August 17, 2020

Crew information
- Umpiring crew: O
- Crew members: #72 Alfonso Márquez (crew chief); #16 Lance Barrett; #83 Mike Estabrook; #44 Malachi Moore

Career highlights and awards
- Special Assignments: MLB at Rickwood Field (2024); Wild Card Series (2024)

Malachi Moore (born June 14, 1990) is an American Major League Baseball umpire. He made his first appearance at the Major League level in 2020 and was promoted to the full time umpiring staff for the 2023 season.

He wears uniform number 44.

== Early life ==
Malachi Moore was born on June 14, 1990, in Compton, California. He grew up with his mother, grandparents, and older brother in a small house in East Compton. His parents separated when he was young; his mother worked for Los Angeles County, and his father was frequently on the road as a truck driver.

Moore attended Manuel Dominguez High School, where he played baseball and football. In 2006, when he was 15, his 19 year old brother was killed in a drive-by shooting. MLB’s Compton Youth Academy opened that year, and Moore spent most of his free time participating in programming and working at the academy. In his words:

I have held every position known to man at that Youth Academy. I watched it be built from the ground up.

The impact of his brother’s death, and the influence of the Youth Academy, led Moore to pursue a career in baseball. He worked as a groundskeeper at the academy, and local ballparks, while attending Compton College. He played college baseball as a second baseman and outfielder, but focused on groundskeeping with the goal of working at Petco Park or Dodger Stadium.

In November 2010, Moore was with some of his college teammates at the Youth Academy when they were approached by umpires looking for participants for a one-day umpiring clinic. MLB umpire Kerwin Danley was one of them. Although Moore was not interested in becoming an umpire, Danley took him aside for one-on-one practice after the clinic.

In Moore, Danley saw "a young Black kid, a baseball player who came from the same kind of neighborhood [he] came from, and someone who had a desire to stay in the game". After working with Danley, Moore "fell in love with [umpiring]" and subsequently attended a week long camp where he was selected to attend the Harry Wendelstedt Umpire School on scholarship. He attended the school in 2011 and 2012, being assigned to the minor leagues on his second attempt.

== Career ==
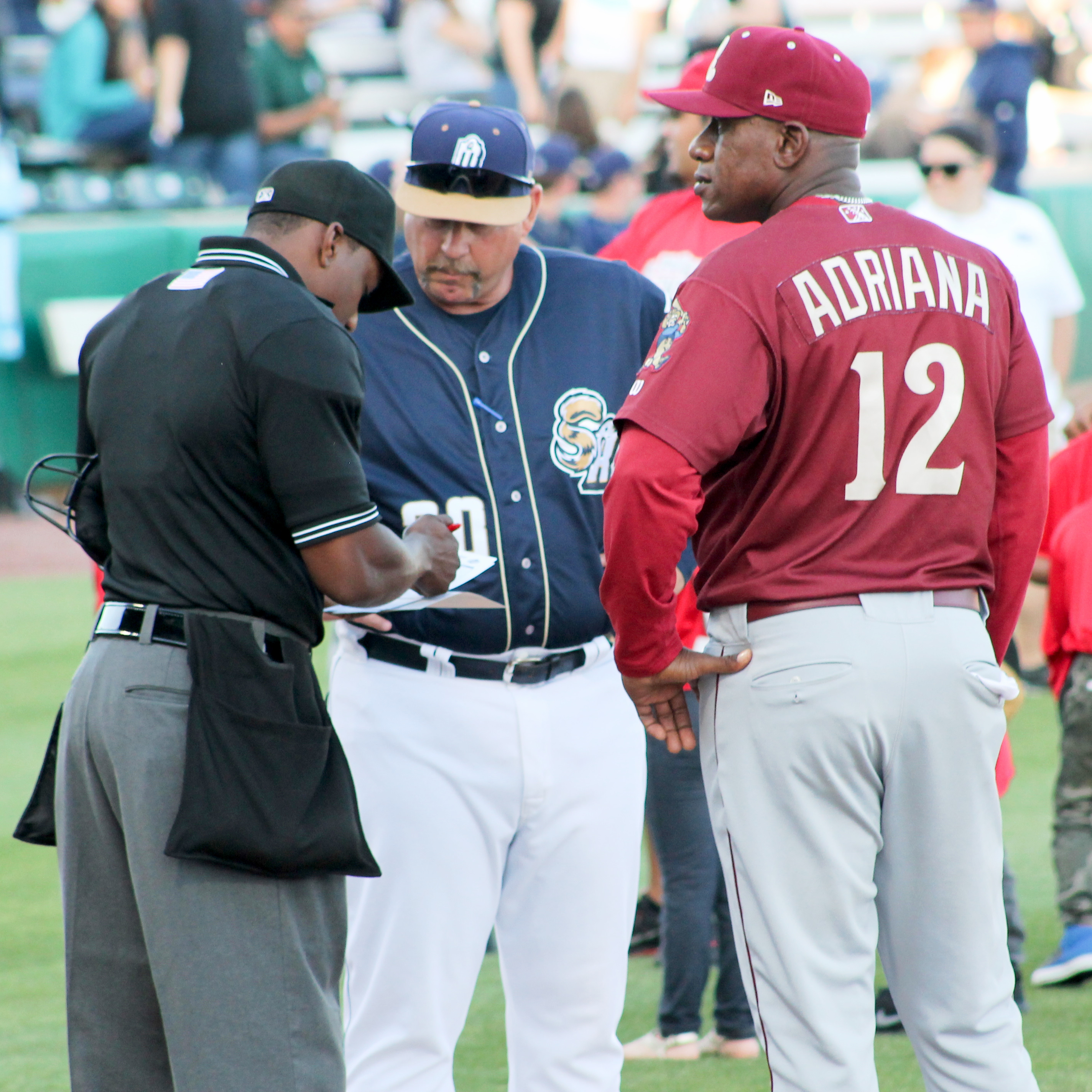
Malachi Moore in San Antonio Texas 2016.

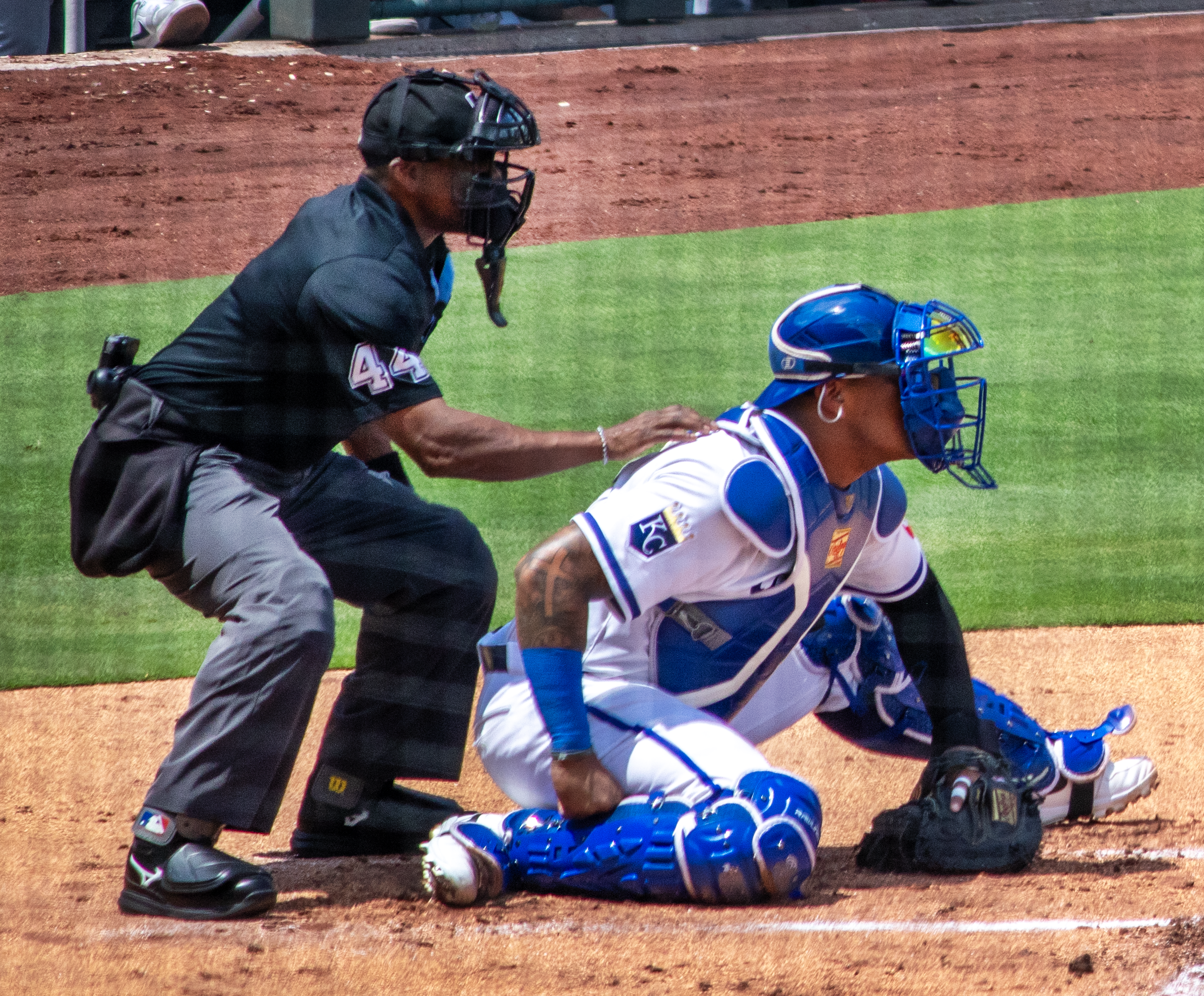
Malachi Moore with KC catcher Salvador Perez, 2025.

After graduating from Wendelstedt in 2012, Moore was assigned to the Arizona Instructional League. He then worked in the Northwoods League, the California League, the South Atlantic League, and the Texas League before being assigned to the Triple A Pacific Coast League. He also worked the Arizona Fall League, and the 2018 All-Star Futures Game.

Moore made his major league debut on August 17, 2020, working a game between the Oakland Athletics and the Arizona Diamondbacks at Chase Field. He was at second base, with Mike Muchlinski at first, Marvin Hudson at third, and Brian Knight at home plate. Moore worked 156 MLB games before being hired as a full time umpire in 2023, and assumed uniform number 44 in honor of his mentor Danley, who wore it before retiring after the 2021 season.

On June 20, 2024, Moore umpired second base for the MLB at Rickwood Field game in Birmingham, Alabama. The game was a tribute to the Negro leagues and featured the first all-Black umpiring crew in MLB history. His first postseason assignment was the 2024 American League Wild Card Series between the Kansas City Royals and the Baltimore Orioles.

== Personal life ==
Moore lives in Phoenix, Arizona, with his wife and two sons. He met his wife while attending college.

He runs an annual umpiring camp at the Compton Youth Academy and is active with UMPS CARE.

== See also ==
- List of Major League Baseball umpires (disambiguation)
