= 2022 National League Wild Card Series =

Teams
Team (Wins)		Manager	Season
Philadelphia Phillies (2)		Rob Thomson	87–75 (.537), GB: 14
St. Louis Cardinals (0)		Oliver Marmol	93–69 (.574), GA: 7
- Dates: October 7–8
- Television: ABC (Game 1); ESPN2 (Game 2)
- TV announcers: Michael Kay, Alex Rodriguez, and Alden Gonzalez
- Radio: ESPN
- Radio announcers: Roxy Bernstein and Kyle Peterson
- Umpires: Vic Carapazza, Laz Díaz, John Libka, Mike Muchlinski, Jeff Nelson (crew chief), D.J. Reyburn

Teams
Team (Wins)		Manager	Season
San Diego Padres (2)		Bob Melvin	89–73 (.549), GB: 22
New York Mets (1)		Buck Showalter	101–61 (.623), GB: 0
- Dates: October 7–9
- Television: ESPN
- TV announcers: Karl Ravech, David Cone, Eduardo Pérez, and Buster Olney
- Radio: ESPN
- Radio announcers: Kevin Brown and Chris Burke
- Umpires: Chris Conroy, Bruce Dreckman, Chris Guccione, Adrian Johnson, Alfonso Márquez (crew chief), Ben May

The 2022 National League Wild Card Series were two best-of-three playoff series in Major League Baseball’s (MLB) 2022 postseason to determine the participating teams of the 2022 National League Division Series. Both Wild Card Series began on October 7, with Game 2s scheduled for October 8 and Game 3s, if necessary, scheduled for October 9. ESPN broadcast both Wild Card Series together with ESPN Radio. These matchups were:

- (3) St. Louis Cardinals (NL Central champions) vs. (6) Philadelphia Phillies (third wild card): Phillies won the series, 2–0.
- (4) New York Mets (first wild card) vs. (5) San Diego Padres (second wild card): Padres won the series, 2–1.

== Background ==
On March 10, Major League Baseball changed the postseason structure for the first time since 2012, adding a sixth team to the postseason in each league, awarding the top two division winners in each league (seeded by record) to receive a bye into the Division Series, and added a best-of-three Wild Card round hosted by the higher seed. The lowest-seeded division winner, and three wild card teams (each seeded according to regular season record), will play in this round. The third seed will play the sixth seed, and the fourth seed will play the fifth seed. The postseason structure is similar to the temporary format MLB used in 2020 due to the COVID-19 pandemic without first-round byes for the top two seeds.

The St. Louis Cardinals (93–69) clinched the National League Central, their fourth straight postseason appearance, and their first as the NL Central winner since 2019 on September 27. However, they were locked into the third seed as the National League division winner with the worst record. They hosted the Philadelphia Phillies (87–75), who was the last team to clinch a postseason berth among the twelve playoff teams on October 3 and are making their first postseason appearance since 2011. The Phillies won four of the seven match-ups against the Cardinals during the regular season.

The New York Mets (101–61) clinched a postseason berth, for their first postseason appearance since 2016 on September 19. They led the National League East for virtually the entire season, but they lost it on the season's last weekend by a three-game sweep from Atlanta, losing the season series 9–10. Consequently, they became the fourth 100-win wild card team following the 106-win 2021 Los Angeles Dodgers, 102-win 2001 Athletics and 100-win 2018 Yankees. They hosted the San Diego Padres (89–73), who clinched their first postseason appearance since 2020, and just the second since 2006, on October 2. San Diego won both series against New York, defeating them 2–1 in early June and late July, for a total of 4–2.

As the top two division winners (seeds by record), the Los Angeles Dodgers (111–51) and Atlanta Braves (101–61) earned a bye and home-field advantage in the NLDS.

== Matchups ==
=== St. Louis Cardinals vs. Philadelphia Phillies ===
Philadelphia won the series, 2–0.

Game	Date	Score	Location	Time	Attendance
1	October 7	Philadelphia Phillies – 6, St. Louis Cardinals – 3	Busch Stadium	3:27	45,911
2	October 8	Philadelphia Phillies – 2, St. Louis Cardinals – 0	Busch Stadium	3:16	48,515

=== New York Mets vs. San Diego Padres ===
San Diego won the series, 2–1.

Game	Date	Score	Location	Time	Attendance
1	October 7	San Diego Padres – 7, New York Mets – 1	Citi Field	3:02	41,621
2	October 8	San Diego Padres – 3, New York Mets – 7	Citi Field	4:13	42,156
3	October 9	San Diego Padres – 6, New York Mets – 0	Citi Field	3:04	39,241

== St. Louis vs. Philadelphia ==
This is just the second postseason match-up between St. Louis and Philadelphia, but there has been a long history between the two teams. In their lone postseason match-up, the two teams previously met in the 2011 National League Division Series, which was won by the Cardinals in five games. The two teams were also involved in one of the more memorable pennant races in MLB history in 1964. It was notable for the Phillies losing a 6 1/2-game lead with 12 games left in the season to the St. Louis Cardinals. Additionally, the Cardinals and Phillies played in the National League East together for 25 seasons (1969–1993).

=== Game 1 ===
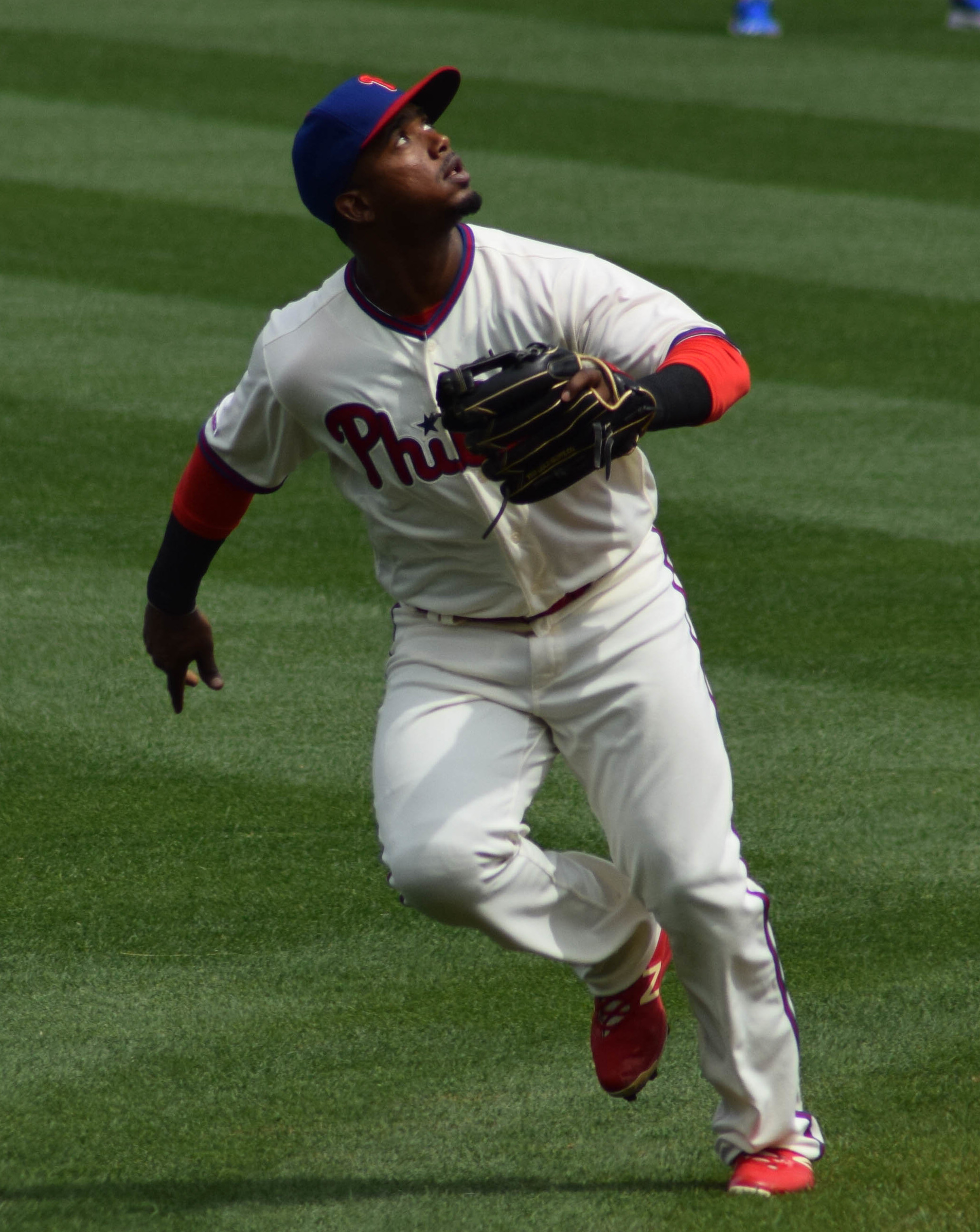
Jean Segura hit the go-ahead 2-run single for the Phillies in Game 1.

October 7, 2022 1:07 pm (CDT) at Busch Stadium in St. Louis, Missouri 61 °F (16 °C), Scattered clouds
Team	1	2	3	4	5	6	7	8	9	R	H	E
Philadelphia	0	0	0	0	0	0	0	0	6	6	5	0
St. Louis	0	0	0	0	0	0	2	0	1	3	5	0
WP: David Robertson (1–0) LP: Ryan Helsley (0–1); Home runs: PHI: None; STL: Juan Yepez (1); Attendance: 45,911; Boxscore

Game 1 featured a pitching match-up between Phillies ace Zack Wheeler, who had not allowed a run to the Cardinals in 12 2/3 regular-season innings, and Jose Quintana, a Cardinals trade deadline acquisition. The game was scoreless until the seventh inning, when Juan Yepez hit a pinch-hit two-run home run off of Jose Alvarado, who had just relieved Wheeler. Yepez's home run was the first go-ahead pinch-hit home run in St. Louis Cardinals postseason history.

The score was still 2–0 in the top of the ninth when Cardinals closer Ryan Helsley, who had jammed fingers on his throwing hand in his previous appearance, allowed a single and two walks, then hit Alec Bohm with a 101-mph fastball, giving the Phillies their first run. Following the hit-by-pitch, Andre Pallante relieved Helsey due to the hand injury. With the bases still loaded, the next batter Jean Segura hit an opposite-field single to give the Phillies a 3–2 lead. The Phillies got three more runs in the inning, making the score 6–2. The Cardinals scored a run in their half of the ninth, but Zach Eflin struck out the game-tying run in Yadier Molina to give the Phillies their first postseason victory in 11 years. Before the game, the St. Louis Cardinals had been 93–0 when leading a postseason game by two or more runs after eight innings. The Phillies' six-run ninth inning set a new record for most runs scored in the ninth inning while trailing in postseason history.

=== Game 2 ===
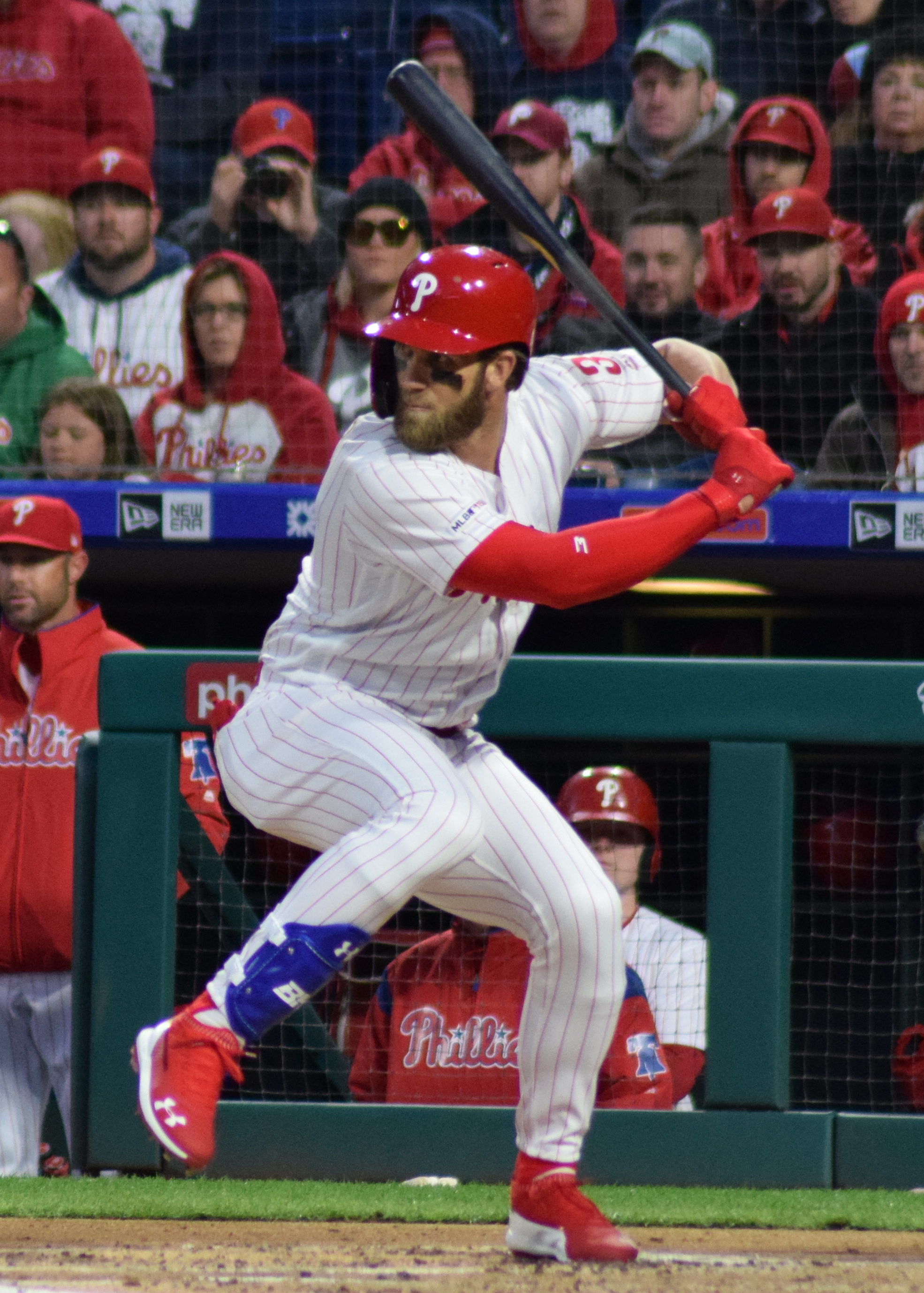
Bryce Harper hit the series-winning home run in Game 2.

October 8, 2022 7:37 pm (CDT) at Busch Stadium in St. Louis, Missouri 55 °F (13 °C), Clear
Team	1	2	3	4	5	6	7	8	9	R	H	E
Philadelphia	0	1	0	0	1	0	0	0	0	2	4	1
St. Louis	0	0	0	0	0	0	0	0	0	0	5	0
WP: Aaron Nola (1–0) LP: Miles Mikolas (0–1) Sv: Zach Eflin (1); Home runs: PHI: Bryce Harper (1); STL: None; Attendance: 48,515; Boxscore

Longtime Phillies ace Aaron Nola started his first postseason game against Miles Mikolas, who produced a 2.38 ERA at home in 14 starts. The Phillies scored two runs via a Bryce Harper solo home run in the second inning and a Kyle Schwarber sacrifice fly in the fifth and it was all the runs they needed. With the win, the Phillies won their first postseason series since the 2010 National League Division Series and advanced to play the Braves in the National League Division Series. For the Cardinals, this was the third straight year they lost in the opening round of the postseason.

Albert Pujols and Yadier Molina, both playing in their last game of their respective careers', each got hits in their last at-bats and were removed for pinch-runners and both received standing ovations.

=== Composite line score ===
2022 NLWC (2–0): Philadelphia Phillies beat St. Louis Cardinals

Team	1	2	3	4	5	6	7	8	9	R	H	E
Philadelphia Phillies	0	1	0	0	1	0	0	0	6	8	9	1
St. Louis Cardinals	0	0	0	0	0	0	2	0	1	3	10	0
Total attendance: 94,426 Average attendance: 47,213

== New York vs. San Diego ==
This is the first postseason match-up between New York and San Diego.

=== Game 1 ===
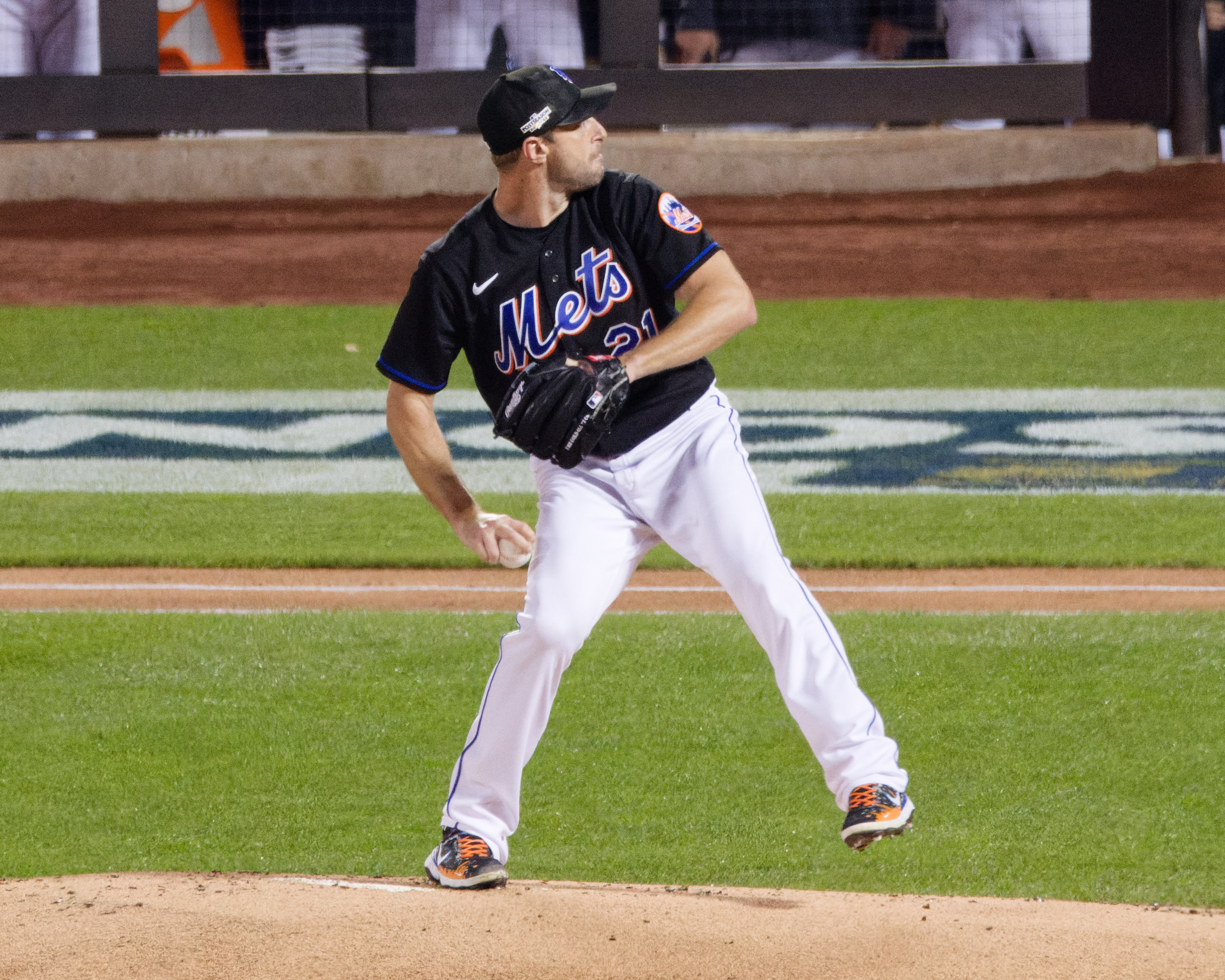
Max Scherzer started Game 1 for the Mets.

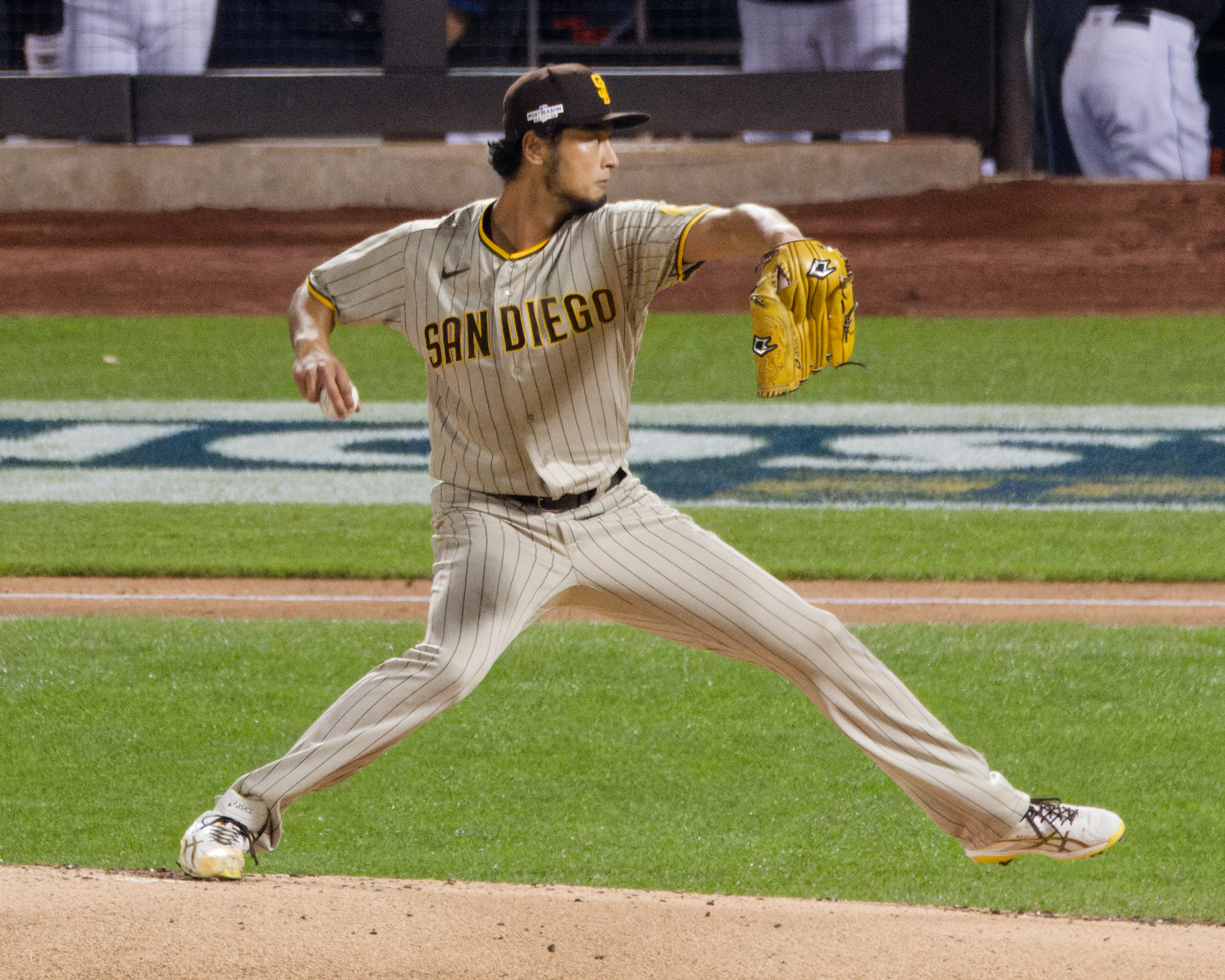
Yu Darvish started Game 1 for the Padres.

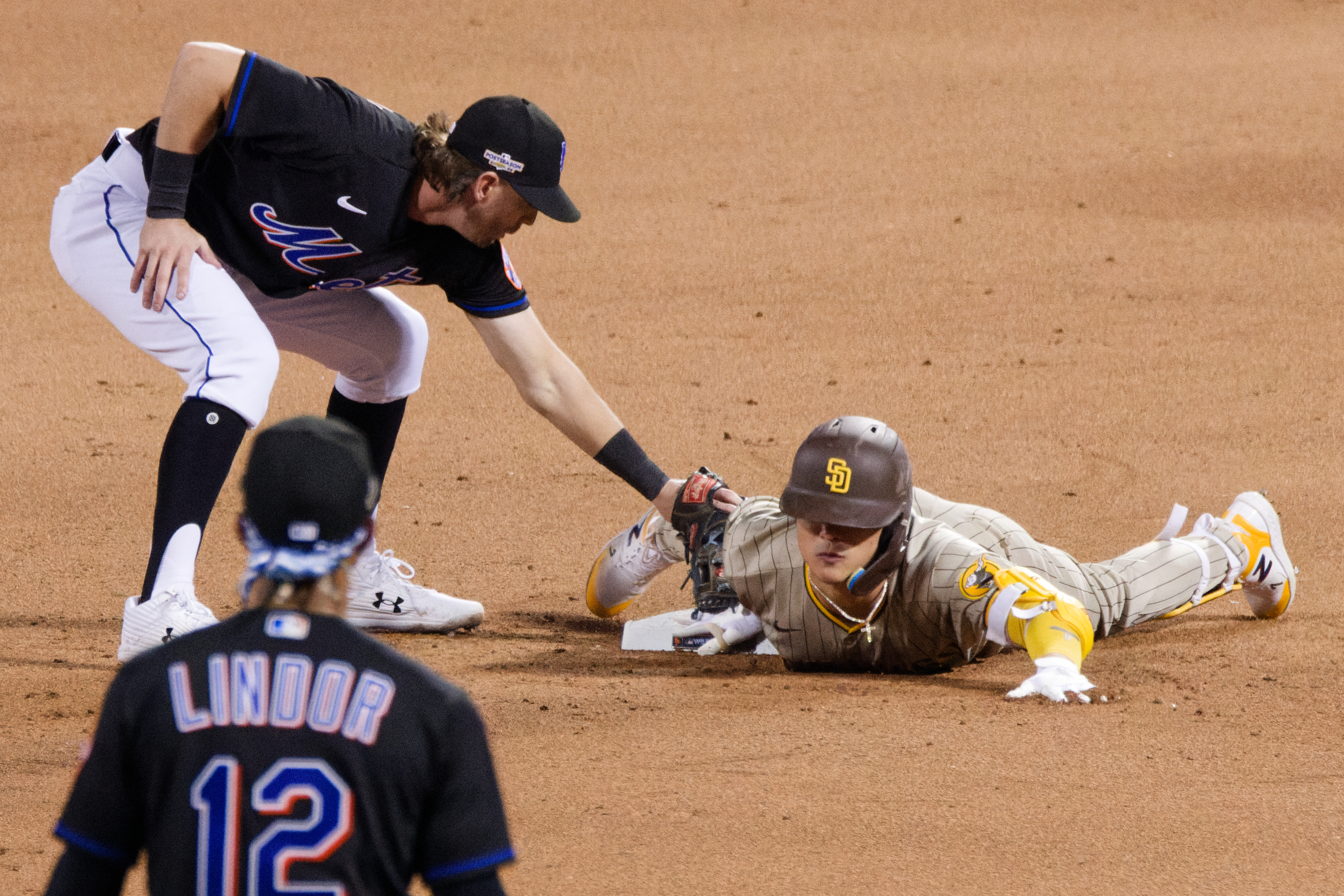
Jeff McNeil places a tag on Ha-seong Kim in Game 1.

October 7, 2022 8:07 pm (EDT) at Citi Field in Queens, New York 68 °F (20 °C), Partly Cloudy
Team	1	2	3	4	5	6	7	8	9	R	H	E
San Diego	2	1	0	0	4	0	0	0	0	7	8	0
New York	0	0	0	0	1	0	0	0	0	1	7	0
WP: Yu Darvish (1–0) LP: Max Scherzer (0–1); Home runs: SD: Josh Bell (1), Trent Grisham (1), Jurickson Profar (1), Manny Machado (1); NYM: Eduardo Escobar (1); Attendance: 41,621; Boxscore

In the top of the first inning, Max Scherzer was greeted with a two-run home run by Padres first baseman Josh Bell. That would be the theme of the night for Scherzer, who gave up four home runs on the night. Scherzer was the second pitcher to allow at least seven runs and four home runs in a postseason game, joining Gene Thompson who did it in the 1939 World Series against the Yankees. Trent Grisham added a solo shot in the second inning. Jurickson Profar's three-run homer off the right field foul pole in the fifth inning broke the game open for the Padres. Two batters later, Manny Machado, capped the Padres' scoring with a solo home run to knock Scherzer out of the game.

Padres starter Yu Darvish worked out of jams in the first and second innings but proceeded to settle in as the game went along. He finished with seven innings pitched and one run allowed, which came via a Eduardo Escobar solo home run in the bottom of the fifth.

=== Game 2 ===
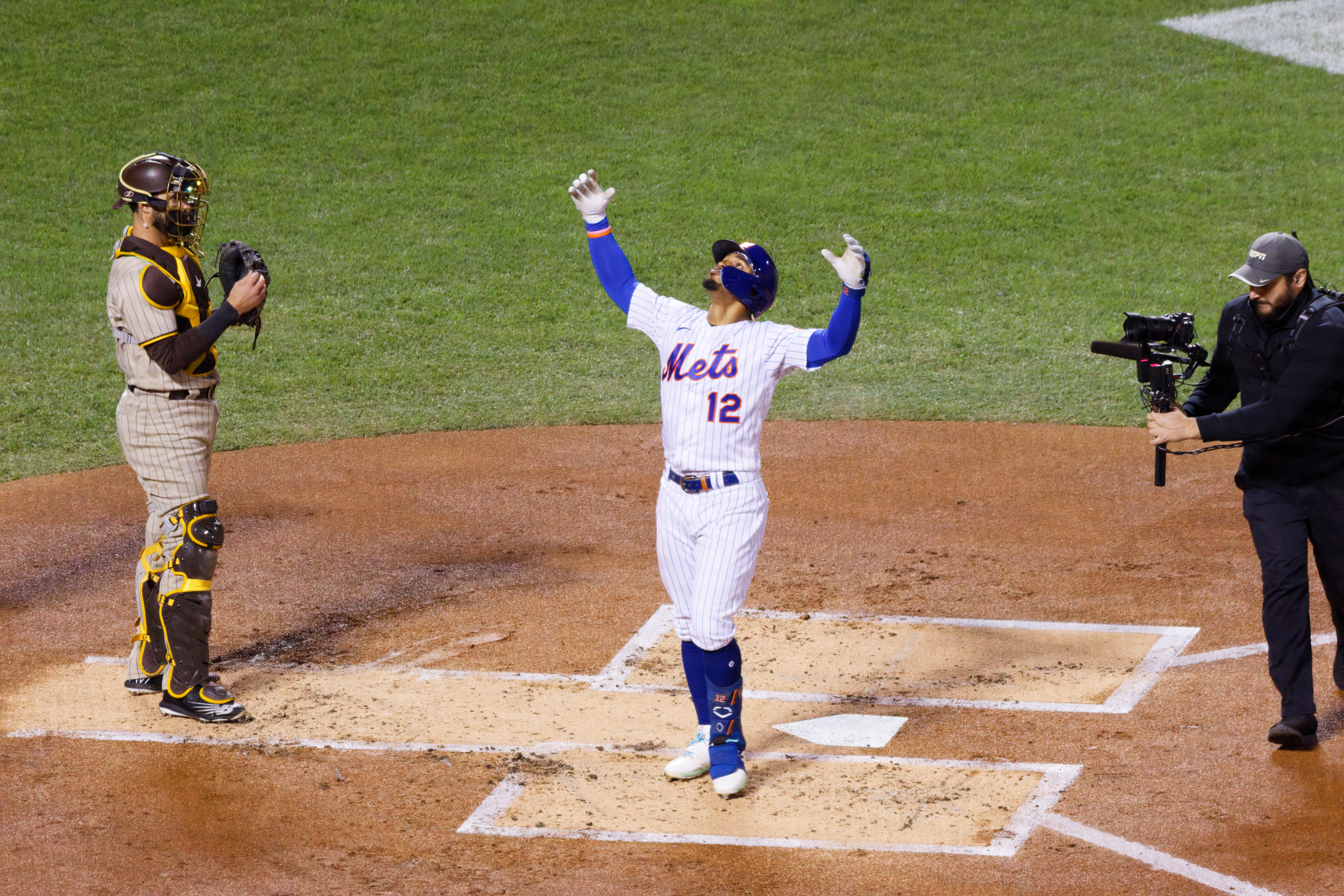
Francisco Lindor hit one of two New York home runs in Game 2, the Mets' only victory of the series.

October 8, 2022 7:37 pm (EDT) at Citi Field in Queens, New York 55 °F (13 °C), Clear
Team	1	2	3	4	5	6	7	8	9	R	H	E
San Diego	0	0	1	0	1	0	0	0	1	3	6	0
New York	1	0	0	1	1	0	4	0	X	7	9	0
WP: Jacob deGrom (1–0) LP: Nick Martinez (0–1) Sv: Seth Lugo (1); Home runs: SD: Trent Grisham (2); NYM: Francisco Lindor (1), Pete Alonso (1); Attendance: 42,156; Boxscore

The early innings of Game 2 were a back-and-forth affair. The Mets took 1–0 and 2–1 leads against Padres starter Blake Snell, but the Padres would answer against Mets starter Jacob deGrom to tie the game each time. The Mets, however, would take the lead for good in the bottom of the fifth inning after Pete Alonso's first career postseason home run gave them a 3–2 lead. DeGrom would limit the Padres to just two runs in his six innings of work.

In an unconventional move by Mets manager Buck Showalter, Mets closer Edwin Díaz was called on to enter the game in the top of the seventh inning. Díaz would pitch a scoreless seventh inning before the Mets added four insurance runs against the Padres bullpen in the bottom half of the inning to extend the Mets' lead to 7–2. Díaz would record two outs in the top of the eighth inning before giving way to Adam Ottavino. Ottavino completed the eighth inning but began to falter after recording two outs in the ninth inning, eventually walking in a run after the Padres had loaded the bases. Showalter called on Seth Lugo to record the final out of the game against Josh Bell, who represented the tying run at the plate with the Mets holding a 7–3 lead. Lugo would induce a groundout to record his first career postseason save and even the series at one game apiece.

=== Game 3 ===
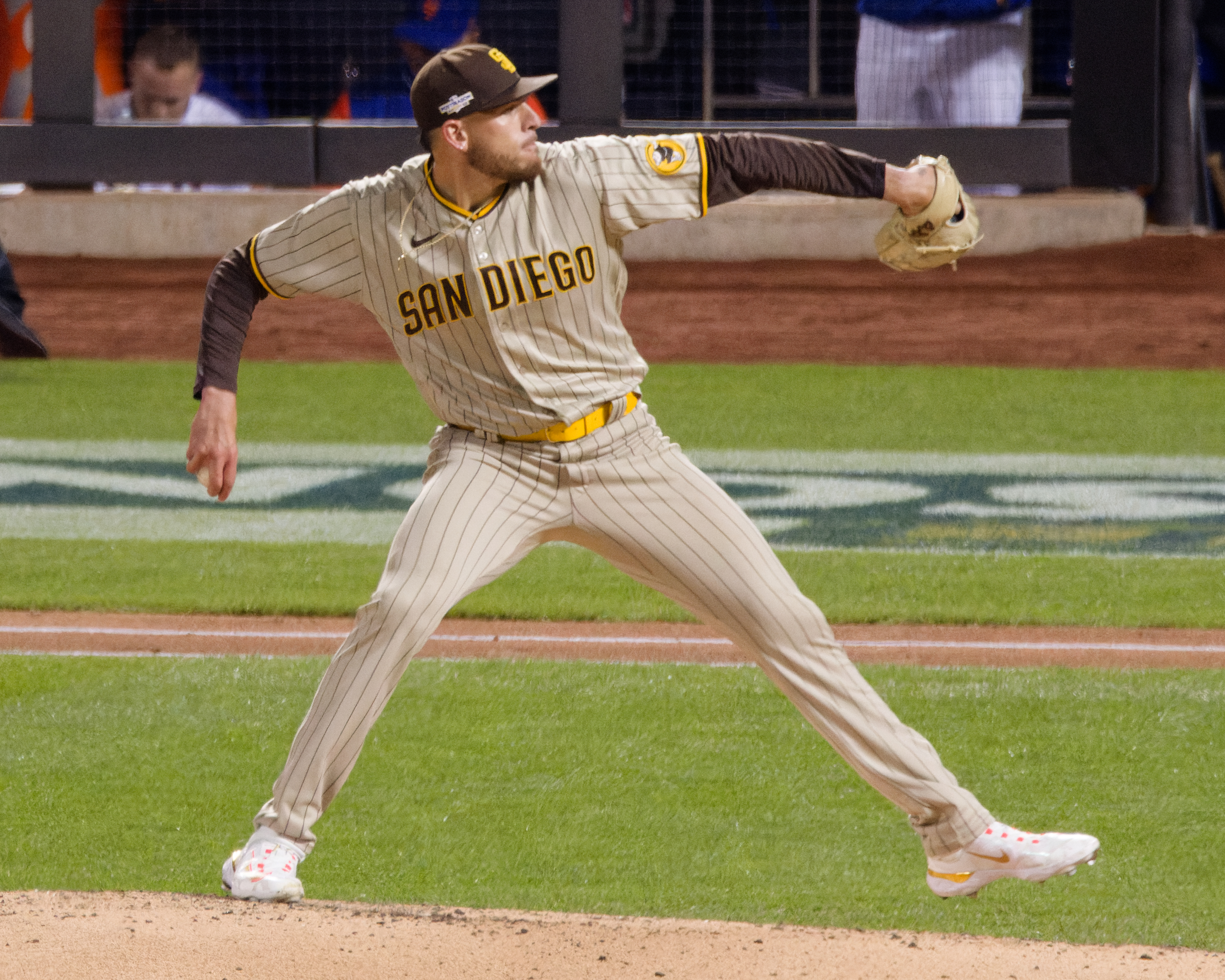
Joe Musgrove gave up no runs on one hit in seven innings pitched in Game 3, earning the win in the Padres' series clincher.

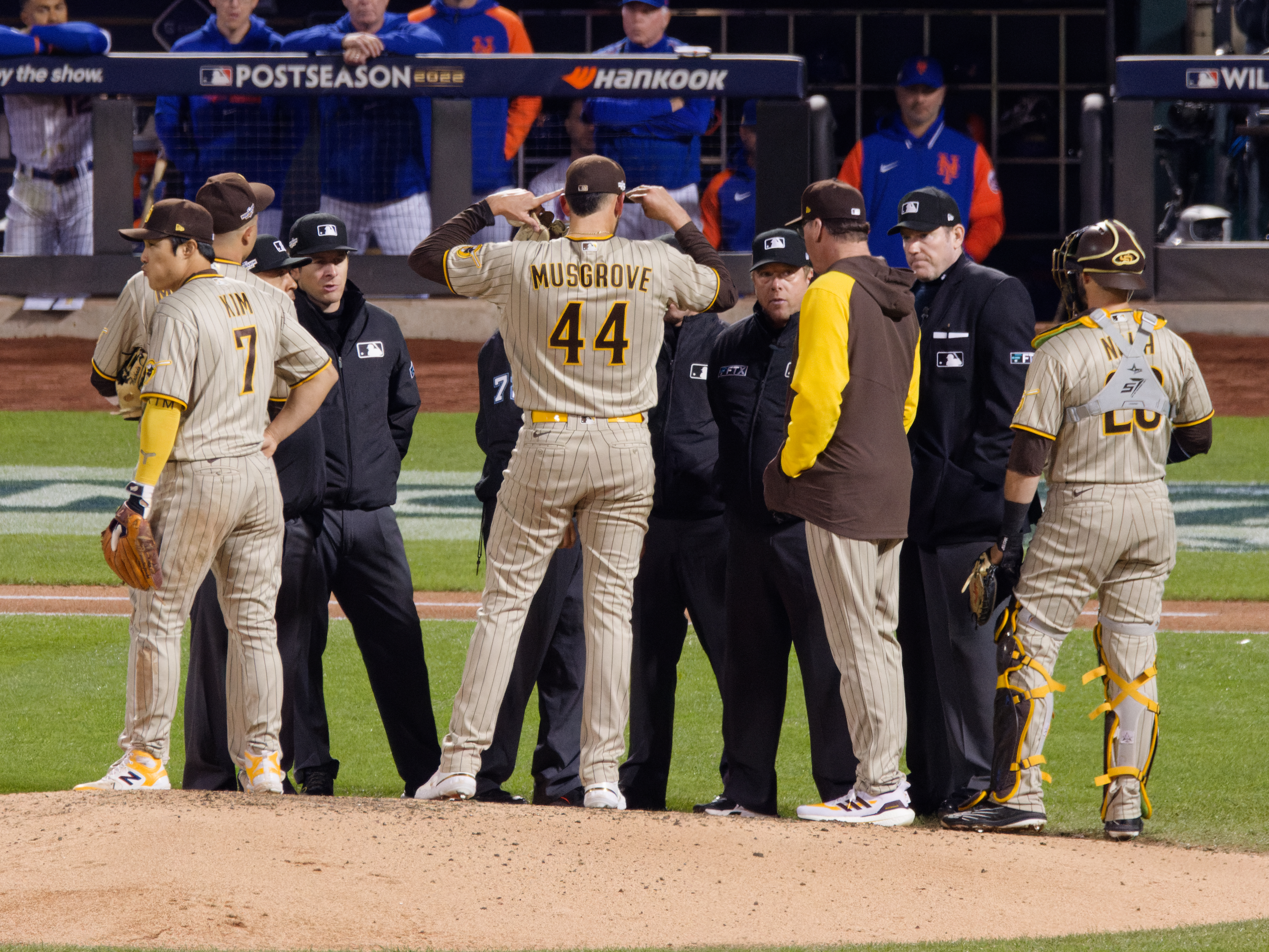
Controversially, umpires checked Joe Musgrove's ears for prohibited foreign substances, but concluded that he had not used any.

October 9, 2022 7:07 pm (EDT) at Citi Field in Queens, New York 60 °F (16 °C), Clear
Team	1	2	3	4	5	6	7	8	9	R	H	E
San Diego	0	2	0	1	1	0	0	2	0	6	10	0
New York	0	0	0	0	0	0	0	0	0	0	1	0
WP: Joe Musgrove (1–0) LP: Chris Bassitt (0–1); Attendance: 39,241; Boxscore

Joe Musgrove pitched seven scoreless innings of one–hit ball and Padres hitters scored six runs off of Chris Bassitt and the Mets bullpen as they advanced to the National League Division Series to face the Dodgers. With the loss, the Mets were the first 100+ win team to fail to reach the Division Series since the Division Series was implemented in 1995.

=== Composite line score ===
2022 NLWC (2–1): San Diego Padres beat New York Mets

Team	1	2	3	4	5	6	7	8	9	R	H	E
San Diego Padres	2	3	1	1	6	0	0	2	1	16	24	0
New York Mets	1	0	0	1	2	0	4	0	0	8	17	0
Total attendance: 123,018 Average attendance: 41,006

== See also ==
- 2022 American League Wild Card Series
