= Alfonso Márquez =

Mexican baseball umpire (born 1972)

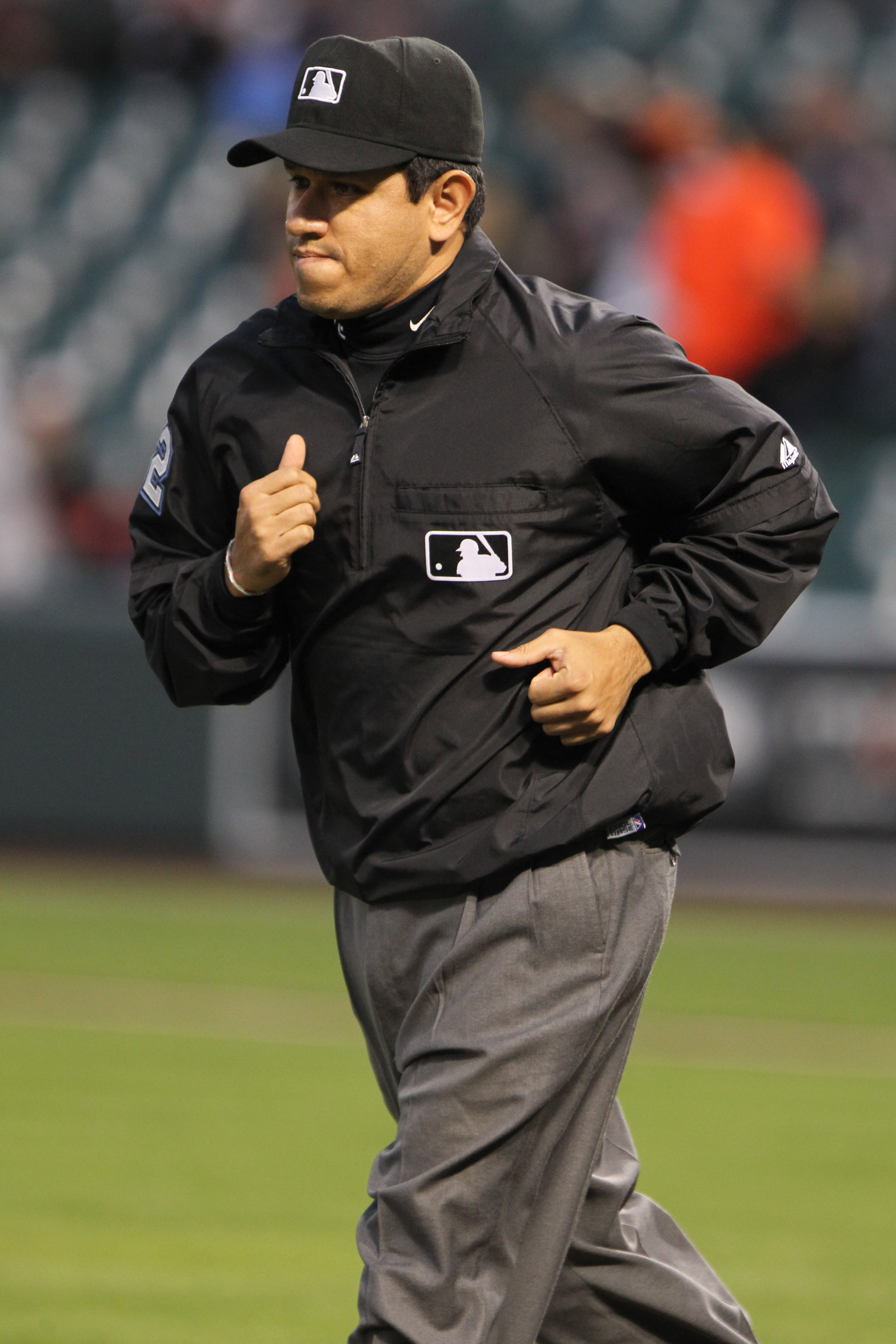
- Márquez in 2011

MLB – No. 72
- Umpire
- Born: April 12, 1972 (age 54); Villanueva, Zacatecas, Mexico

MLB debut
- August 13, 1999

Crew information
- Umpiring crew: O
- Crew members: #72 Alfonso Márquez (crew chief); #16 Lance Barrett; #83 Mike Estabrook; #44 Malachi Moore

Career highlights and awards
- Special assignments: World Series (2006, 2011, 2015, 2021, 2023); League Championship Series (2003, 2008, 2013, 2016, 2017, 2022, 2025); Division Series (2001, 2002, 2005, 2006, 2011, 2012, 2015, 2018, 2019, 2020, 2021, 2023, 2026); Wild Card Games/Series (2017, 2020, 2022, 2024, 2025); All-Star Game (2006, 2018); Fort Bragg Game (2016); MLB Little League Classic (2022)

Alfonso Márquez (born April 12, 1972) is a Mexican umpire in Major League Baseball (MLB) who worked in the National League in 1999 and has worked throughout both major leagues since 2000. He was promoted to crew chief for the 2020 season, becoming the first full time Latino-born crew chief. Márquez wears uniform number 72, a number he shared with friend and National Hockey League linesman Stéphane Provost.

== Early years ==
Márquez graduated from Fullerton Union High School in Orange County, California, in 1990.

Prior to working in MLB, Márquez umpired in the Arizona Fall League, Arizona Instructional League, Northwest League, Midwest League, California League, Southern League, and Pacific Coast League.

== MLB career ==
Márquez worked his first MLB game on August 13, 1999, as the home plate umpire in the second game of a doubleheader between the Montreal Expos and Colorado Rockies. He was the first Mexican-born umpire in major league history. He worked 30 MLB games in his first season, and became a full-time MLB umpire in 2000; through the end of the 2016 season, he has umpired 2111 regular season MLB games and has issued 56 ejections.

=== Notable games ===
Márquez has officiated five World Series (2006, 2011, 2015, 2021, 2023), six League Championship Series (2003, 2008, 2013, 2016, 2017, 2022), and 13 Division Series (2001, 2002, 2005, 2006, 2011, 2012, 2015, 2018, 2019, 2020, 2021, 2023, 2026), as well as the 2006 All-Star Game and 2018 All-Star Game.

Márquez was at second base on August 7, 2004, for Greg Maddux's 300th win.

Márquez was the third base umpire for the final Montreal Expos home game on September 29, 2004. The Florida Marlins defeated the Expos 9–1.

On July 2, 2011, Márquez ejected both Toronto Blue Jays manager John Farrell and pitcher Jon Rauch. In the top of the 9th inning, with the Blue Jays down a run, Shane Victorino of the Philadelphia Phillies singled, driving in Chase Utley, who was called safe at home by Márquez; Rauch was ejected for arguing the call, and Farrell was ejected for unsportsmanlike conduct. This incident gained some notoriety because of the size of Rauch and his anger towards Márquez. Rauch, at a height of 6 feet 11 inches (2.11 m) and weighing well over 250 pounds (110 kg), had to be restrained by catcher J. P. Arencibia, Farrell, and third base coach Brian Butterfield. In the process, Rauch's jersey was ripped off and Farrell's jaw was dislocated by Rauch.

Marquez was the umpire at third base for Miguel Cabrera's 3,000th career hit on April 23, 2022.

Márquez was the first base umpire in a game on May 10, 2022, between the Toronto Blue Jays and New York Yankees, where Blue Jays pitcher Yimi García, who was just came into the game, gave up a game-tying three-run home run to Yankees batter Giancarlo Stanton in the bottom of the 6th. The next batter, Josh Donaldson, was hit by the pitch on a 0-1 count which made members of the Yankees mad. After a discussion by Márquez and his crew, Márquez threw out García with no warning which confused and angered García and the Blue Jays dugout believing there was no intent. Márquez also threw out Blue Jays pitching coach Pete Walker for arguing. But according to Blue Jays manager Charlie Montoyo, who was thrown out the next inning for arguing a warning, he said that the reason they threw out Yimi García was because Donaldson and Blue Jays catcher Tyler Heineman were exchanged words at each other about something a couple of innings before and believed they threw at Donaldson intentionally in a tie game after giving up a home run the next inning. Donaldson said that he and Heineman did exchange words and said the conversation was about baseball. Márquez said the exchange between Donaldson and Heineman “definitely played into it,” along with the game situation following Stanton's home run. There is no footage of the exchange between Heineman and Donaldson.

On April 25, 2025, during a game between the New York Mets and the Washington Nationals, with runners on first and second and no outs, Marquez missed a call on a bounced line-drive to Nathaniel Lowe, calling it a caught ball and an out. This allowed the Nationals to throw to first and second, with Marquez calling both runners out and ending the inning in a 3-4-3 triple play call. Mets Manager Carlos Mendoza repeatedly asked Marquez to convene with the other umpires about the unchallengeable play, but Marquez refused. The Mets eventually lost the game by one run. The missed call resulted in many people calling for a rule change to allow infield hits to be reviewable, as well as leading to significant criticism of Marquez for his handling of the call.

== See also ==
- List of Major League Baseball umpires (disambiguation)
