= Jordan Hicks (baseball) =

American baseball player (born 1996)

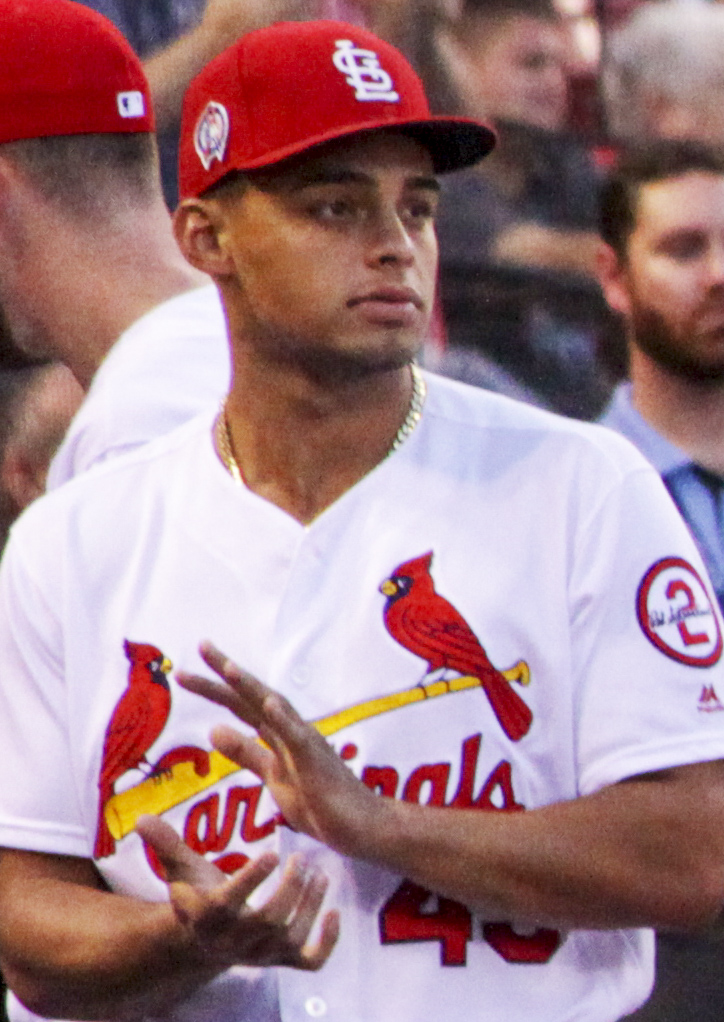
- Hicks with the St. Louis Cardinals in 2018

Chicago White Sox – No. 44
- Pitcher
- Born: September 6, 1996 (age 30); Houston, Texas, U.S.
- Bats: Right Throws: Right

MLB debut
- March 29, 2018, for the St. Louis Cardinals

MLB statistics (through 2026 season)
- Win–loss record: 20–37
- Earned run average: 4.36
- Strikeouts: 473
- Stats at Baseball Reference

Teams
- St. Louis Cardinals (2018–2019, 2021–2023); Toronto Blue Jays (2023); San Francisco Giants (2024–2025); Boston Red Sox (2025); Chicago White Sox (2026–present)

Jordan McKinley Hicks (born September 6, 1996) is an American professional baseball pitcher for the Chicago White Sox of Major League Baseball (MLB). He has previously played in MLB for the St. Louis Cardinals, Toronto Blue Jays, San Francisco Giants, and Boston Red Sox.

The Cardinals selected Hicks in the third round of the 2015 MLB draft, and he made his MLB debut with them in 2018. The Cardinals traded him to the Blue Jays in 2023. As a relief pitcher, Hicks has been one of the hardest throwers in the major leagues, having been measured as throwing as hard as 105 miles per hour (169 km/h).

== Amateur career ==
Hicks attended Klein Oak High School in Klein, Texas, before transferring to Cypress Creek High School in Houston, Texas, for his senior year. He signed with Tulane University to play college baseball.

== Professional career ==
=== St. Louis Cardinals (2015-2023) ===
==== Minor leagues ====
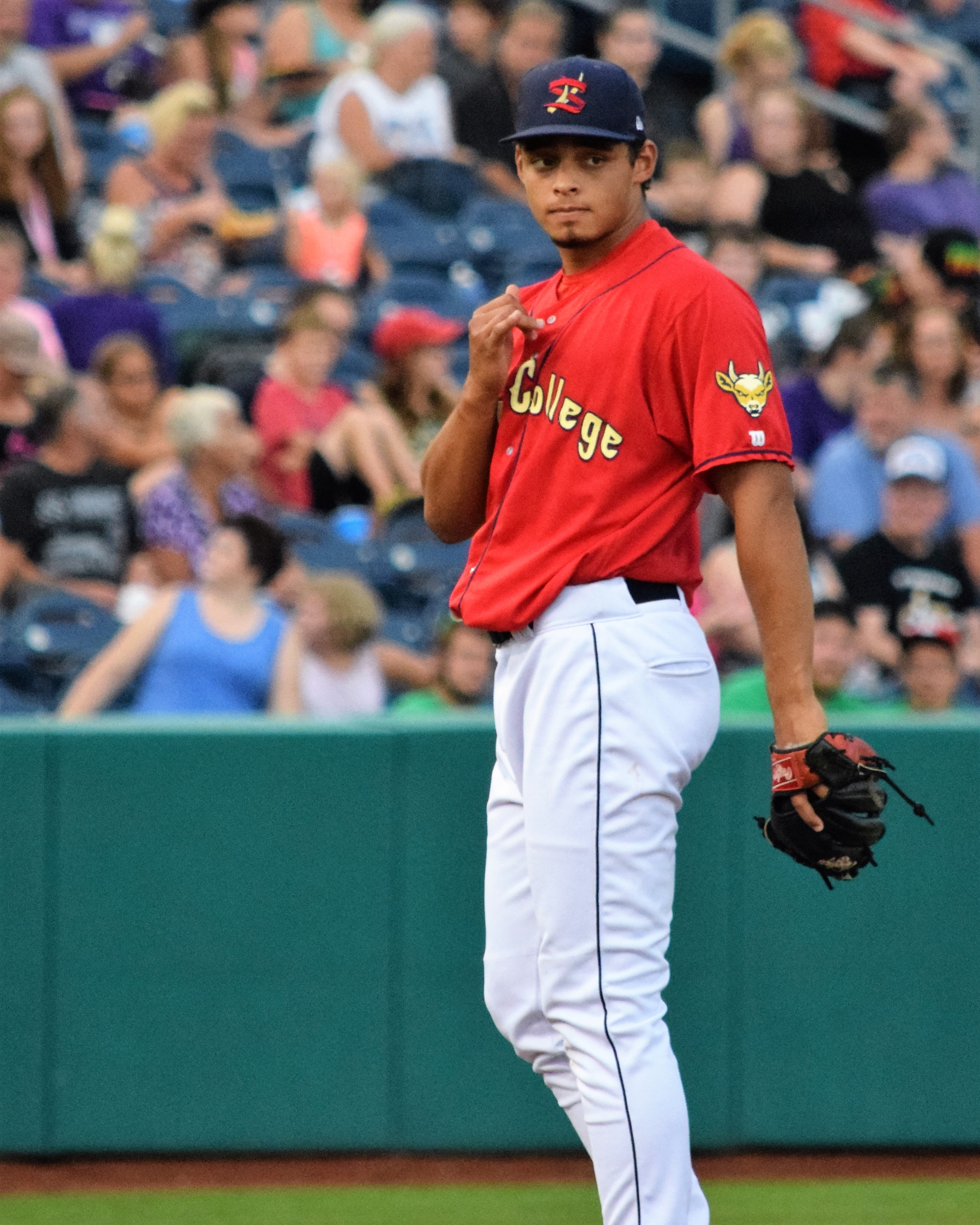
Hicks with the State College Spikes in 2016

The St. Louis Cardinals selected Hicks in the third round of the 2015 Major League Baseball draft out of Cypress Creek High School, and he signed with them for $600,000, forgoing his commitment to Tulane. He made his professional debut in 2016 with the Johnson City Cardinals of the rookie-level Appalachian League and was promoted to the State College Spikes of the Low-A New York–Penn League during the season. In 12 starts between the two teams, he was 6–2 with a 2.97 ERA.

Hicks started the 2017 season with the Peoria Chiefs of the Single-A Midwest League, where he was named to the Midwest League All-Star game. He was promoted to the Palm Beach Cardinals of the High-A Florida State League in July, with whom he was 0–1 with one save and a 1.00 ERA, and 32 strikeouts in 27 innings. Hicks finished 2017 with a combined 8–3 record and a 2.74 ERA in 22 games (19 starts) between the two clubs. After the season, the Cardinals assigned Hicks to the Surprise Saguaros of the Arizona Fall League (AFL), where he was selected to the Fall Stars Game. He finished the AFL season with nine appearances, a 0–2 record, a 6.32 ERA, and 16 strikeouts over 15 2/3 innings, along with hitting up to 102.6 miles per hour (165.1 km/h).

==== 2018–2020 ====
Hicks was a non-roster invitee to 2018 spring training. He made St. Louis' Opening Day roster despite not having ever pitched above High-A. He made his major league debut against the New York Mets and produced the highest average fastball velocity of the day at 100.4 miles per hour (161.6 km/h). He pitched one scoreless inning in which he earned his first strikeout against Jay Bruce. On April 21, Hicks earned his first major league win when he pitched the final 2 1/3 innings—all scoreless—versus the Cincinnati Reds to help seal a 4–3 victory.

On May 20, Hicks threw the fastest pitch in MLB history, at 105.1 miles per hour (169.1 km/h). He shares this record with Aroldis Chapman. His four-seam fastball and sinker had the second- and third-highest average speeds of any MLB pitcher's pitches in 2018, at 100.5 miles per hour (161.7 km/h) and 100.4 miles per hour (161.6 km/h). He continued to garner attention throughout the season as one of the hardest throwing pitchers in MLB. Hicks finished his 2018 rookie campaign with a 3–4 record with six saves, a 3.59 ERA, and a 1.34 WHIP, striking out 70 batters in 77 2/3 relief innings.

Hicks began the 2019 season as St. Louis' closer. On June 22, 2019, Hicks was removed from a game with elbow irritation and discomfort, and was originally diagnosed with triceps tendinitis. On June 24, it was revealed he had a torn ulnar collateral ligament in his right elbow. On June 25, 2019, Hicks opted to have Tommy John surgery on his right elbow, putting him out for the rest of the 2019. He officially underwent the surgery on June 26. For the 2019 season, Hicks compiled a 2–2 record with 14 saves and a 3.14 ERA, striking out 31 batters in 28 1/3 innings.

In 2019, his four-seam fastball was, on average, the fastest in major league baseball, at 100.9 miles per hour (162.4 km/h). His average pitch velocity was the highest in MLB, at 101.1 miles per hour (162.7 km/h). He threw the fastest pitch of the season, at 104.3 miles per hour (167.9 km/h).

On July 13, 2020, Hicks, who has Type 1 diabetes, announced he would skip the 2020 season due to the COVID-19 pandemic.

==== 2021–2023 ====
On March 14, 2021, Hicks was involved in a 22-pitch at-bat during a spring training game against the New York Mets. Mets shortstop Luis Guillorme fouled off 16 pitches before ultimately drawing a walk. This is, to date, the longest at-bat in terms of number of pitches in Major League history.

In early May, Hicks was placed on the injured list due to inflammation in his right elbow. On May 14, Hicks was transferred to the 60-day injured list. He made two rehab starts, but did not make an appearance for the Cardinals for the rest of the season. He was selected to play in the Arizona Fall League for the Glendale Desert Dogs after the season.

Hicks signed a one-year, $937,500 contract with the Cardinals to avoid salary arbitration on March 22. On April 6, one day before Opening Day, the Cardinals announced that Hicks would be the team's fifth starter in the absence of Jack Flaherty.

On January 13, 2023, Hicks agreed to a one-year, $1.8375 million contract with the Cardinals, avoiding salary arbitration.

=== Toronto Blue Jays (2023) ===
On July 30, 2023, the Cardinals traded Hicks to the Toronto Blue Jays in exchange for minor league pitchers Adam Kloffenstein and Sem Robberse. He was the first Blue Jays player to be issued the uniform number #12 since Edwin Encarnación in 2010 (the number had originally been retired for Roberto Alomar in 2011, however the Blue Jays quietly unretired it in 2021 following allegations of sexual misconduct committed by Alomar). Hicks made 25 appearances down the stretch for the Blue Jays, compiling a 2-3 record and 2.63 ERA with 22 strikeouts and four saves over 24 innings of work. He became a free agent after the season.

=== San Francisco Giants (2024–2025) ===
On January 18, 2024, Hicks signed a four-year contract worth $44 million with the San Francisco Giants. While he was primarily a reliever at that point, he was converted into a starting pitcher for the Giants. In 29 appearances (20 starts) for San Francisco, Hicks compiled a 4–7 record and 4.10 ERA with 96 strikeouts and one save across 109 2/3 innings pitched.

Hicks made 13 appearances (nine starts) for the Giants in 2025, struggling to a 1–5 record and 6.47 ERA with 43 strikeouts over 48 1/3 innings of work.

=== Boston Red Sox (2025) ===
On June 15, 2025, the Giants traded Hicks to the Boston Red Sox, along with Kyle Harrison, James Tibbs III, and Jose Bello, in exchange for Rafael Devers.

According to Baseball Reference, Hicks had the fewest pitching wins above replacement (WAR) in MLB in 2025, with -1.8.

=== Chicago White Sox ===
On February 1, 2026, the Red Sox traded Hicks and David Sandlin to the Chicago White Sox in exchange for Gage Ziehl.

== Pitching style ==
Hicks is one of the hardest throwers in the major leagues, and has been clocked as throwing as hard as 105 miles per hour (169 km/h). At the start of his professional baseball career, his pitch velocity was inconsistent and he had various mechanical issues. While pitching in an All-Star game, Hicks decided to throw as hard as he could, and reached 100 miles per hour (160 km/h) twice. His velocity and overall mechanics began improving, and he continued pitching in the Arizona Fall League after the 2017 season ended, where he regularly threw 100 mph and above. While transitioning into a starting role for the San Francisco Giants in 2024, his velocity fell as he worked on preserving his arm over multiple innings, rarely throwing above 96 mph. In 2025, Hicks's pitch velocity increased while playing in Spring Training and continued into the regular season.

== Personal life ==
Hicks was diagnosed with Type 1 diabetes when he was a junior in high school.

Hicks grew up a Houston Astros fan.
