= 2026 World Baseball Classic championship =

2026 World Baseball Classic championship game
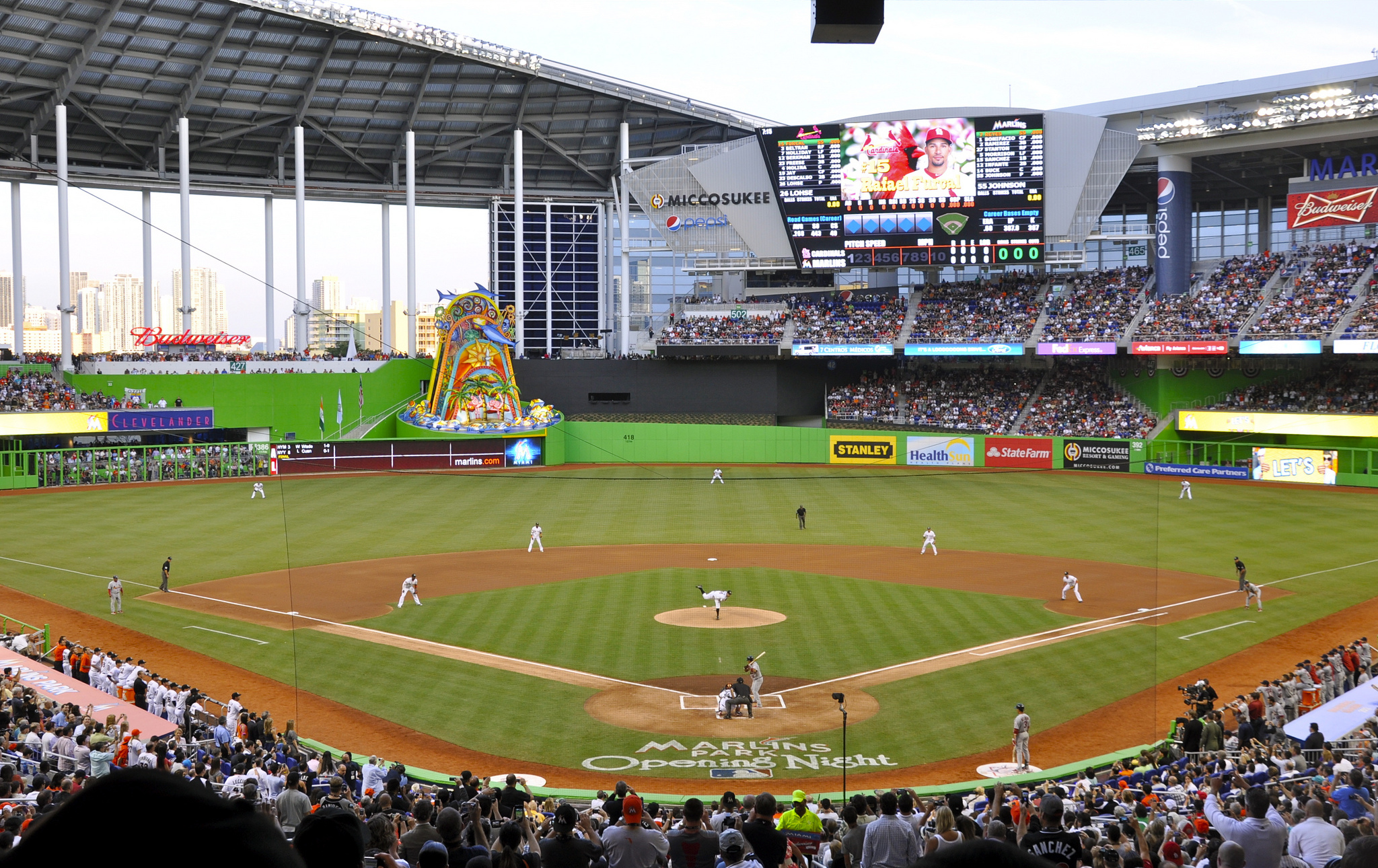
- LoanDepot Park in Miami
Venezuela	United States
3	2
	1	2	3	4	5	6	7	8	9	R	H	E
Venezuela	0	0	1	0	1	0	0	0	1	3	6	0
United States	0	0	0	0	0	0	0	2	0	2	3	0
- Date: March 17, 2026
- Venue: LoanDepot Park
- City: Miami, Florida, U.S.
- Managers: Omar López (Venezuela); Mark DeRosa (United States)
- Umpires: HP: (United States) Dan Bellino; 1B: (United States) Cory Blaser; 2B: (United States) Jeremie Rehak; 3B: (Canada) Chris Graham; LF: (Puerto Rico) Delfin Colon; RF: (Spain) Cuti Suarez
- Attendance: 36,190
- Time of game: 20:00 EDT (UTC−4)
- Ceremonial first pitch: Miguel Cabrera and Ken Griffey Jr.
- Television: Multiple
- Radio: Multiple

The 2026 World Baseball Classic championship game, also commonly known as the 2026 WBC Final, was the deciding game of the 2026 World Baseball Classic. This was the sixth edition of the World Baseball Classic, a men's international baseball tournament sanctioned by the World Baseball Softball Confederation (WBSC) in partnership with Major League Baseball (MLB) and Major League Baseball Players Association (MLBPA).

The game was played on March 17, 2026, at LoanDepot Park in Miami, Florida, between Venezuela and host United States. This was the first WBC final appearance by Venezuela, and the third consecutive by the United States. Venezuela won the game 3–2, earning its first WBC title. It was the first baseball world championship and major international sporting competition won by Venezuela since the 1945 Amateur World Series.

== Background ==
=== Road to the championship ===
The United States won the 2017 WBC championship and reached the final in 2023, losing to Japan. Venezuela advanced to the final game for the first time; at the previous tournament in 2023, it lost to the United States in the quarterfinals. The two nations had met five times before, in all five previous editions of the World Baseball Classic, with the U.S. winning three games and Venezuela winning two. Prior to the start of the tournament, the United States team was among the favorites to win the championship. It went 3–1 in Pool B, advancing as the pool's runner-up. Its only loss was an 8–6 upset against Italy. The U.S. defeated Canada in the quarterfinals, and Dominican Republic in the semifinals.

Venezuela had not won a major international sporting competition since the 1945 Amateur World Series. (Note: Not including regional tournaments such as the Pan American Games, which Venezuela won in 1959) It had a 3–1 record in Pool D, losing to the Dominican Republic in the final game, advancing as the pool runner-up. It defeated defending champion Japan in the quarterfinals and dark horse team Italy in the semifinals. Because Venezuela used six relief pitchers in its semifinal game against Italy, Venezuela's manager Omar López said that three different Major League Baseball (MLB) teams contacted him before the final requesting that their relief pitchers on their teams not pitch on back-to-back nights. Because both teams had identical records in the earlier stages, the home team was determined by a coin toss, which went to the United States.

==== Results table ====
The score of the finalist is always given first. H: home; A: away.

Venezuela		Round	United States	
Opponent	Result	Pool stage	Opponent	Result
Netherlands	6–1 (H)	Game 1	Brazil	15–5 (A)
Israel	11–3 (H)	Game 2	Great Britain	9–1 (H)
Nicaragua	4–0 (A)	Game 3	Mexico	5–3 (H)
Dominican Republic	5–7 (H)	Game 4	Italy	6–8 (H)
Pool D runner-up		Pool placement	Pool B runner-up	
Opponent	Result	Knockout stage	Opponent	Result
Japan	8–5 (A)	Quarterfinals	Canada	5–3 (A)
Italy	4–2 (A)	Semifinals	Dominican Republic	2–1 (A)

=== United States–Venezuela relations ===
The game took place against the backdrop of the January 2026 raid in which U.S. military forces captured Venezuelan president Nicolás Maduro and his wife, Cilia Flores. Many Venezuelan expatriates living in Miami attended the games, bringing drums and dancing in the stands; some also yelled chants against Maduro during the tournament. Being considered a supporter of the government by many expats, Miguel Cabrera was also heckled by some Venezuelans during the tournament. Venezuelan players came to the U.S. for spring training earlier than in previous years to ensure their safety. Coaches and players on the Venezuelan national team refused to comment on the political situation due to fears of reprisals against their families and friends.

== Game ==
=== Details ===
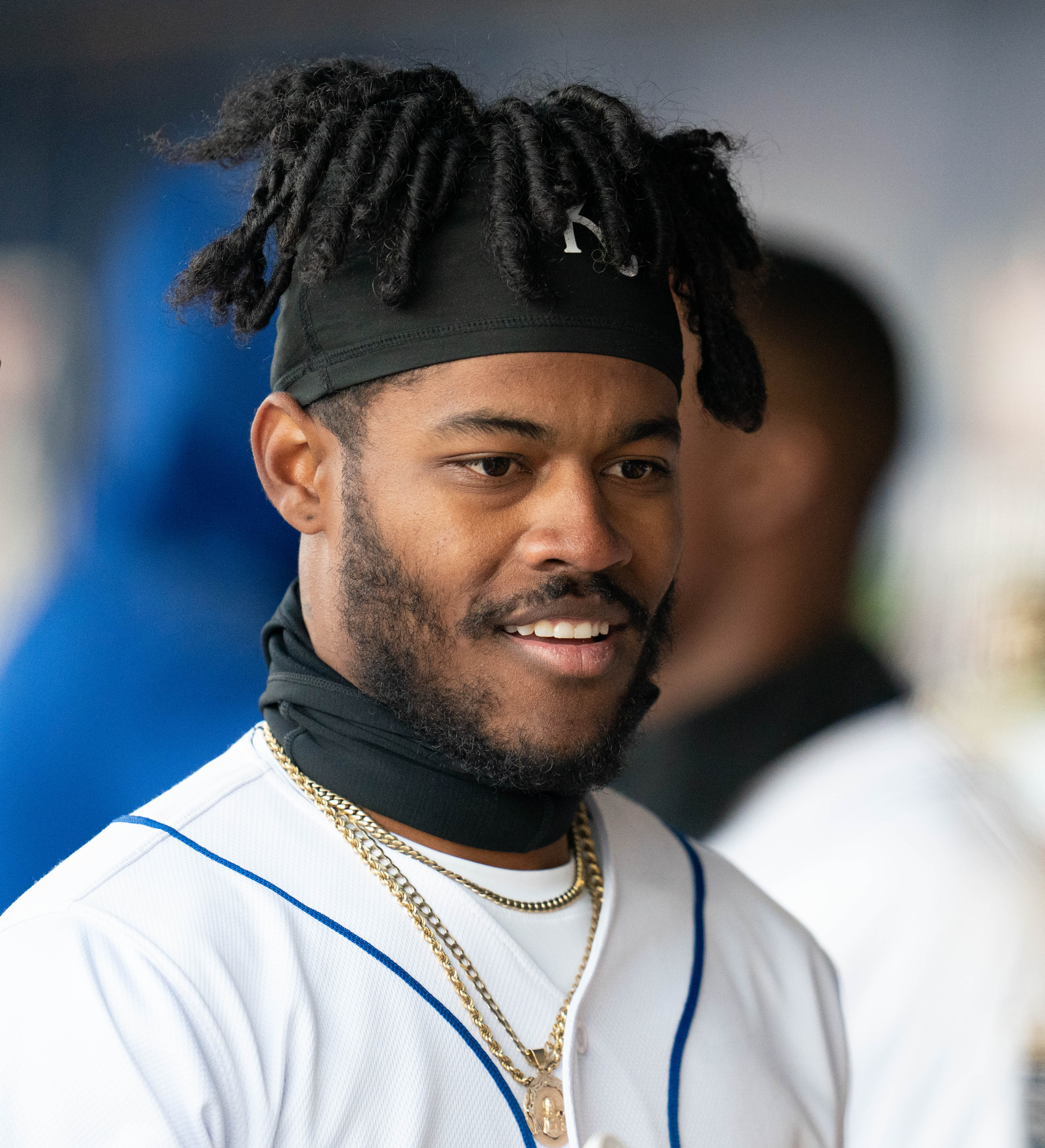
Maikel García, the most valuable player of the tournament

The starting pitchers for the game were Eduardo Rodríguez for Venezuela and Nolan McLean for the United States. After two scoreless innings, Venezuela scored the first run of the game in the top of the third inning. Salvador Perez hit a single, followed by a walk for Ronald Acuña Jr., the baserunners advanced on a wild pitch by McLean, and then Maikel García hit a run batted in (RBI) sacrifice fly that allowed Perez to reach home plate and score. Wilyer Abreu led off the top of the fifth inning with a solo home run, extending the lead to 2–0.

The United States was held scoreless by Rodríguez for 4 1/3 innings, then also by relief pitchers Eduard Bazardo, José Buttó, and Ángel Zerpa. In the bottom of the eighth inning, pitched by Venezuela's Andrés Machado, the United States' Bobby Witt Jr. drew a walk, then Bryce Harper hit a two-run home run, tying the game with one inning left to play.

In the top of the ninth inning, Luis Arráez drew a walk and Javier Sanoja substituted for him as a pinch runner. Sanoja then stole second base and Eugenio Suárez drove Sanoja in with an RBI double to give Venezuela a 3–2 lead. In the bottom of the ninth inning, another Venezuela relief pitcher, Daniel Palencia, retired the United States without scoring, to secure the victory. During the gold medal presentation at the end of the game, García was named the tournament's most valuable player.

==== Linescore ====
March 17, 2026, 20:00 EDT (UTC−4) at LoanDepot Park in Miami, Florida, United States
Team	1	2	3	4	5	6	7	8	9	R	H	E
Venezuela	0	0	1	0	1	0	0	0	1	3	6	0
United States	0	0	0	0	0	0	0	2	0	2	3	0
WP: Andrés Machado (1–0) LP: Garrett Whitlock (0–1) Sv: Daniel Palencia (3); Home runs: VEN: Wilyer Abreu (2); USA: Bryce Harper (1); Attendance: 36,190; Umpires: HP: Dan Bellino, 1B: Cory Blaser, 2B: Jeremie Rehak, 3B: Chris Graham, LF: Delfin Colon, RF: Cuti Suarez; Boxscore

==== Boxscore ====
Venezuela – Batting
Player	Pos.	AB	R	H	RBI	BB	SO	BA	OPS
Ronald Acuña Jr.	RF	3	0	1	0	1	0	.269	.962
Maikel García	3B	3	0	0	1	0	0	.385	.970
Luis Arráez	1B	3	0	0	0	1	0	.308	1.059
Javier Sanoja	PR	0	1	0	0	0	0	.375	1.125
Willson Contreras	1B	0	0	0	0	0	0	.250	.558
Eugenio Suárez	DH	4	0	1	1	0	2	.200	.788
Gleyber Torres	2B	3	0	0	0	0	3	.250	.681
Andres Gimenez	2B	1	0	0	0	0	0	.111	.384
Ezequiel Tovar	SS	4	0	2	0	0	0	.471	1.147
Wilyer Abreu	LF	3	1	1	1	1	0	.250	.845
Salvador Perez (c)	C	4	1	1	0	0	0	.182	.364
Jackson Chourio	CF	3	0	0	0	0	2	.200	.478

Venezuela – Pitching
Player	IP	H	R	ER	BB	SO	HR	ERA
Eduardo Rodríguez	4 1/3	1	0	0	1	4	0	3.86
Eduard Bazardo (H, 3)	2/3	0	0	0	0	1	0	2.70
José Buttó (H, 2)	1	1	0	0	0	0	0	0.00
Ángel Zerpa (H, 2)	2/3	0	0	0	1	1	0	0.00
Andrés Machado (W, 1–0)(BS, 1)	1 1/3	1	2	2	1	2	1	2.84
Daniel Palencia (S, 3)	1	0	0	0	0	2	0	0.00

United States – Batting
Player	Pos.	AB	R	H	RBI	BB	SO	BA	OPS
Bobby Witt Jr.	SS	3	1	0	0	1	0	.250	.733
Bryce Harper	1B	4	1	2	2	0	0	.214	.624
Aaron Judge (c)	RF	4	0	0	0	0	3	.222	.845
Kyle Schwarber	DH	3	0	0	0	1	3	.320	.909
Alex Bregman	3B	3	0	0	0	0	0	.143	.578
Gunnar Henderson	PH	1	0	0	0	0	0	.400	1.267
Roman Anthony	LF	3	0	0	0	1	1	.280	.920
Will Smith	C	3	0	0	0	0	1	.231	.621
Brice Turang	2B	3	0	1	0	0	1	.364	.936
Byron Buxton	CF	1	0	0	0	0	1	.000	.222
Pete Crow-Armstrong	PH/CF	2	0	0	0	0	0	.263	.965

United States – Pitching
Player	IP	H	R	ER	BB	SO	HR	ERA
Nolan McLean	4 2/3	4	2	2	1	4	1	5.87
Brad Keller	1 1/3	0	0	0	0	1	0	4.50
Will Vest	1	1	0	0	0	1	0	0.00
Griffin Jax	1	0	0	0	0	1	0	0.00
Garrett Whitlock (L, 0–1)	1/3	1	1	1	1	0	0	2.70
Tyler Rogers	2/3	0	0	0	1	0	0	0.00

== Broadcasting ==
The WBC championship game was televised in the United States on Fox in English and on Fox Deportes in Spanish. Play-by-play announcer Joe Davis and color analyst John Smoltz called the English language broadcast of the games for Fox, and were joined by Ken Rosenthal and Tom Verducci as field reporters. The game averaged 10.8 million viewers on Fox and Fox Deportes combined, peaking at 12.1 million during the later stages of the game. The broadcasters in Venezuela were a pool of TV channels, that included: ESPN/Disney+, 1Baseball Network, Televen, IVC, ByM Sport and Venevisión.

== Aftermath ==
Following Venezuela's victory, acting president Delcy Rodríguez declared a national holiday for March 18, with the exception of essential workers. She also received the trophy at the presidential palace and declared that it should tour around Venezuela. For their victory, the Venezuelan team will reportedly split US$6.75 million of the US$37 million prize pool among the players and staff, for approximately US$112,500 per person.

On September 16, 2026, Venezuela's championship-winning team was inducted into the Venezuelan Baseball Hall of Fame and Museum, with a unanimous vote from the Hall of Fame's historical committee.
