= 2026 World Baseball Classic knockout stage =

The knockout stage of the 2026 World Baseball Classic took place from March 13 to 17, 2026. The top two teams from each pool automatically qualify for the top-eight single-elimination tournament, beginning with the quarterfinals at Daikin Park in Houston, Texas, and LoanDepot Park in Miami, Florida. The semifinals and championship game took place in Miami.

== Format ==
The top two teams from each pool advanced to the single-elimination bracket. Houston hosted two quarterfinal games at Daikin Park, between the top 2 teams in pool A and top 2 teams in pool B, while the other two quarterfinals, between the top 2 teams in pool C and the top 2 teams in pool D, and the rest of the tournament, took place in Miami at LoanDepot Park. The dates of the quarterfinal games of the United States and Japan were predetermined, regardless of whether they finished first or second in pool B and C, respectively.

== Qualified teams ==
Pool	Winners	Runners-up
A	Canada	Puerto Rico
B	Italy	United States
C	Japan	South Korea
D	Dominican Republic	Venezuela

== Bracket ==
Quarterfinals
March 14 – Miami
Venezuela	8
Japan	5
March 14 – Houston
Puerto Rico	6
Italy	8
March 13 – Houston
United States	5
Canada	3
March 13 – Miami
South Korea	0
Dominican Republic (F/7)	10

Semifinals
March 16 – Miami
Venezuela	4
Italy	2
March 15 – Miami
United States	2
Dominican Republic	1

Final
March 17 – Miami
Venezuela	3
United States	2

== Quarterfinals ==
Date	Local time	Road team	Score	Home team	Inn.	Venue	Game duration	Attendance	Boxscore
Mar 13, 2026	18:30 EDT	South Korea	0–10	Dominican Republic	7	LoanDepot Park	2:17	30,805	Boxscore
Mar 13, 2026	19:00 CDT	United States	5–3	Canada		Daikin Park	2:55	38,054	Boxscore
Mar 14, 2026	14:00 CDT	Puerto Rico	6–8	Italy		Daikin Park	3:32	34,291	Boxscore
Mar 14, 2026	21:00 EDT	Venezuela	8–5	Japan		LoanDepot Park	3:07	34,548	Boxscore

=== South Korea vs. Dominican Republic ===
March 13, 2026 6:30 PM EDT at LoanDepot Park in Miami, United States
Team	1	2	3	4	5	6	7	R	H	E
South Korea	0	0	0	0	0	0	0	0	2	0
Dominican Republic	0	3	4	0	0	0	3	10	9	1
WP: Cristopher Sánchez (1−0) LP: Hyun-jin Ryu (0−1); Home runs: KOR: None; DOM: Austin Wells (2); Attendance: 30,805; Umpires: HP − Dan Iassogna, 1B − Chris Segal, 2B − Tim Meyer, 3B − Maikol Tibibijo; Boxscore

=== United States vs. Canada ===
March 13, 2026 7:00 PM CDT at Daikin Park in Houston, United States
Team	1	2	3	4	5	6	7	8	9	R	H	E
United States	1	0	2	0	0	2	0	0	0	5	8	0
Canada	0	0	0	0	0	3	0	0	0	3	8	1
WP: Logan Webb (2−0) LP: Michael Soroka (1−1) Sv: Mason Miller (1); Home runs: USA: None; CAN: Bo Naylor (1); Attendance: 38,054; Umpires: HP − Bill Miller, 1B − Carlos Torres, 2B − Zdeněk Zidek, 3B − Jon Byrne; Boxscore

=== Puerto Rico vs. Italy ===
March 14, 2026 2:00 PM CDT at Daikin Park in Houston, United States
Team	1	2	3	4	5	6	7	8	9	R	H	E
Puerto Rico	1	1	0	0	0	0	0	4	0	6	7	0
Italy	4	0	0	4	0	0	0	0	X	8	8	1
WP: Sam Aldegheri (1−0) LP: Seth Lugo (1−1) Sv: Greg Weissert (3); Home runs: PUR: Willi Castro (1); ITA: None; Attendance: 34,291; Umpires: HP − Carlos Torres, 1B − Bill Miller, 2B − Jon Byrne, 3B − Zdeněk Zidek; Boxscore

=== Venezuela vs. Japan ===
March 14, 2026 9:00 PM EDT at LoanDepot Park in Miami, United States
Team	1	2	3	4	5	6	7	8	9	R	H	E
Venezuela	1	1	0	0	2	3	0	1	0	8	10	0
Japan	1	0	4	0	0	0	0	0	0	5	7	1
WP: Enmanuel De Jesus (2−0) LP: Hiromi Itoh (0−1) Sv: Daniel Palencia (1); Home runs: VEN: Ronald Acuña Jr. (2), Maikel García (1), Wilyer Abreu (1); JPN: Shohei Ohtani (3), Shōta Morishita (1); Attendance: 34,548; Umpires: HP − Chris Segal, 1B − Dan Iassogna, 2B − Maikol Tibibijo, 3B − Tim Meyer; Boxscore

== Semifinals ==
Date	Local time	Road team	Score	Home team	Inn.	Venue	Game duration	Attendance	Boxscore
Mar 15, 2026	20:00 EDT	United States	2–1	Dominican Republic		LoanDepot Park	2:55	36,337	Boxscore
Mar 16, 2026	20:00 EDT	Venezuela	4–2	Italy		LoanDepot Park	2:42	35,382	Boxscore

=== United States vs. Dominican Republic ===
March 15, 2026 8:00 PM EDT at LoanDepot Park in Miami, United States
Team	1	2	3	4	5	6	7	8	9	R	H	E
United States	0	0	0	2	0	0	0	0	0	2	7	0
Dominican Republic	0	1	0	0	0	0	0	0	0	1	8	1
WP: Paul Skenes (2−0) LP: Gregory Soto (0−1) Sv: Mason Miller (2); Home runs: USA: Gunnar Henderson (2), Roman Anthony (1); DOM: Junior Caminero (3); Attendance: 36,337; Umpires: HP − Cory Blaser, 1B − Jeremie Rehak, 2B − Dan Bellino, 3B − Delfin Colon, LF − Cuti Suárez, RF − Chris Graham; Boxscore

=== Venezuela vs. Italy ===
March 16, 2026 8:00 PM EDT at LoanDepot Park in Miami, United States
Team	1	2	3	4	5	6	7	8	9	R	H	E
Venezuela	0	0	0	1	0	0	3	0	0	4	8	0
Italy	0	2	0	0	0	0	0	0	0	2	5	0
WP: Angel Zerpa (1−0) LP: Michael Lorenzen (1−1) Sv: Daniel Palencia (2); Home runs: VEN: Eugenio Suárez (2); ITA: None; Attendance: 35,382; Umpires: HP − Jeremie Rehak, 1B − Dan Bellino, 2B − Cory Blaser, 3B − Cuti Suárez, LF − Chris Graham, RF − Delfin Colon; Boxscore

== Final ==
March 17, 2026, 20:00 EDT (UTC−4) at LoanDepot Park in Miami, Florida, United States
Team	1	2	3	4	5	6	7	8	9	R	H	E
Venezuela	0	0	1	0	1	0	0	0	1	3	6	0
United States	0	0	0	0	0	0	0	2	0	2	3	0
WP: Andrés Machado (1–0) LP: Garrett Whitlock (0–1) Sv: Daniel Palencia (3); Home runs: VEN: Wilyer Abreu (2); USA: Bryce Harper (1); Attendance: 36,190; Umpires: HP: Dan Bellino, 1B: Cory Blaser, 2B: Jeremie Rehak, 3B: Chris Graham, LF: Delfin Colon, RF: Cuti Suarez; Boxscore
