= 2026 World Baseball Classic =

International baseball tournament

Tournament details
- Countries: Japan; United States; Puerto Rico
- Cities: (United States) Houston, Texas (United States) Miami, Florida (Puerto Rico) San Juan (Japan) Tokyo
- Dates: March 5–17, 2026
- Teams: 20

Final positions
- Champions: Venezuela (1st title)
- Runners-up: United States
- Third place: Dominican Republic
- Fourth place: Italy

Tournament statistics
- Games played: 47
- Attendance: 1,355,266 (28,835 per game)
- Best BA: (Japan) Sōsuke Genda (.500)
- Most HRs: Four tied (Note: Junior Caminero, Jarren Duran, Shohei Ohtani, and Vinnie Pasquantino) (3)
- Most SBs: (Chinese Taipei) Tsung-Che Cheng (4)
- Best ERA: Eleven tied (0.00)
- Most Ks (as pitcher): (Dominican Republic) Cristopher Sánchez (12)

Awards
- MVP: (Venezuela) Maikel García

The 2026 World Baseball Classic was an international professional baseball tournament between 20 national baseball teams, and the sixth iteration of the World Baseball Classic (WBC). It ran from March 5 to 17, 2026. The pool-play rounds were played in LoanDepot Park in Miami, Florida; Daikin Park in Houston, Texas; Hiram Bithorn Stadium in San Juan, Puerto Rico; and the Tokyo Dome in Tokyo, Japan. Two quarterfinals were played in Houston, while the remaining knockout stage games were played in Miami.

Japan was the defending champion, defeating the United States in the 2023 WBC championship game, but was eliminated by the eventual champion Venezuela in the quarterfinals. Japan's failure to reach the semifinals was its worst-ever finish in tournament history. The Dominican Republic and Italy, the tournament's last undefeated teams, were eliminated by the United States and Venezuela, respectively, in the semifinals, meaning that for the first time since 2017, no team finished the WBC with an undefeated record. The Dominican Republic and Venezuela, the top two teams from the Americas (alongside Olympic hosts United States), qualified for the 2028 Olympic baseball tournament, to be held in Los Angeles.

Venezuela won the World Baseball Classic for the first time, taking a 3–2 lead in the championship game with a run batted in double by Eugenio Suárez in the top of the ninth inning. Maikel García was named the most valuable player of the tournament.

== Teams ==
=== Qualification ===
Qualification status: Qualified for the 2026 World Baseball Classic Participated in the qualifier but failed to qualify

16 teams qualified for the 2026 WBC tournament by virtue of having placed in the top four of their respective pools in the 2023 World Baseball Classic tournament.

Four additional teams qualified through the 2026 WBC qualifying tournament. The qualifying tournament included 8 teams, downsized from the 12 teams that had competed in the 2023 WBC qualifiers. The first pool took place in Taipei, and included Chinese Taipei, Spain, Nicaragua, and South Africa; the second pool took place in Tucson, Arizona, and included Colombia, China, Brazil, and Germany. The Taipei pool ran from February 21–25, 2025, and the Tucson pool ran from March 2–6, 2025.

Colombia, Nicaragua, Brazil, and Chinese Taipei all qualified for the 2026 WBC. Brazil qualified for the first time since 2013. China failed to qualify for the first time in the World Baseball Classic, as it was eliminated after it lost all three of its games in the qualifiers.

Region	Team	Qualification method	Prev. apps	Previous best result	WBSC world ranking^{1}
Americas	Brazil	Qualifiers Pool B 2nd-place playoff winner	1	First round (2013)	22
Americas	Canada	2023 World Baseball Classic Pool C 3rd place	5	First round (2006, 2009, 2013, 2017)/pool stage (2023)	20
Americas	Colombia	Qualifiers Pool B winner	2	First round (2017)/pool stage (2023)	13
Americas	Cuba	2023 World Baseball Classic Pool A winner	5	Runners-up (2006)	10
Americas	Dominican Republic	2023 World Baseball Classic Pool D 3rd place	5	Champions (2013)	12
Americas	Mexico	2023 World Baseball Classic Pool C winner	5	Semifinals (2023)	6
Americas	Nicaragua	Qualifiers Pool A winner	1	Pool stage (2023)	16
Americas	Panama	2023 World Baseball Classic Pool A 4th place	3	First round (2006, 2009)/pool stage (2023)	8
Americas	Puerto Rico	2023 World Baseball Classic Pool D Runners-up	5	Runners-up (2013, 2017)	7
Americas	United States	2023 World Baseball Classic Pool C Runners-up	5	Champions (2017)	3
Americas	Venezuela	2023 World Baseball Classic Pool D winner	5	Semifinals (2009)	5
Asia	Chinese Taipei	Qualifiers Pool A Second-place playoff winner	5	Second round (2013)	2
Asia	Japan	2023 World Baseball Classic Pool B winner	5	Champions (2006, 2009, 2023)	1
Asia	South Korea	2023 World Baseball Classic Pool B 3rd place	5	Runners-up (2009)	4
Europe	Czechia	2023 World Baseball Classic Pool B 4th place	1	Pool stage (2023)	15
Europe	Great Britain	2023 World Baseball Classic Pool C 4th place	1	Pool stage (2023)	19
Europe	Israel	2023 World Baseball Classic Pool D 4th place	2	Second round (2017)	21
Europe	Italy	2023 World Baseball Classic Pool A Runners-up	5	Second round (2013)/quarterfinals (2023)	14
Europe	Netherlands	2023 World Baseball Classic Pool A 3rd place	5	Semifinals (2013, 2017)	9
Oceania	Australia	2023 World Baseball Classic Pool B Runners-up	5	Quarterfinals (2023)	11

^{1} Ranking as of December 31, 2025

=== Pools ===
The pools and schedule were announced on August 21, 2024. Each pool contained an unspecified winner of a qualifier. The pool assignments of the teams that advanced from the qualifiers (pot 5) were announced on April 9, 2025. The pool assignments prioritized the hosts (Japan, Puerto Rico, and the United States). The remaining pool assignments were made based on WBSC World Rankings, competitive balance, and commercial and geographic interest.

Note: Numbers in parentheses indicate positions in the WBSC World Rankings at the time of the announcement of the pools.

Pot 1	Pot 2	Pot 3	Pot 4	Pot 5
Japan (1) (H); United States (5) (H); Puerto Rico (9) (H); Venezuela (3)	Mexico (4); South Korea (6); Netherlands (7); Panama (8)	Cuba (10); Dominican Republic (11); Australia (12); Italy (14)	Czech Republic (15); Great Britain (18); Israel (19); Canada (22)	Chinese Taipei (2); Colombia (13); Nicaragua (16); Brazil (23)

Note: Numbers in parentheses indicate positions in the WBSC World Rankings at the time of the announcement of the pools. The decimal number represents the average ranking in the designated pool.

Pot	Pool A (12.4)	Pool B (12.8)	Pool C (7.2)	Pool D (11.2)
Pot	(Puerto Rico) San Juan	(United States) Houston	(Japan) Tokyo	(United States) Miami
Pot 1	Puerto Rico (9) (H)	United States (5) (H)	Japan (1) (H)	Venezuela (3)
Pot 2	Panama (8)	Mexico (4)	South Korea (6)	Netherlands (7)
Pot 3	Cuba (10)	Italy (14)	Australia (12)	Dominican Republic (11)
Pot 4	Canada (22)	Great Britain (18)	Czechia (15)	Israel (19)
Pot 5	Colombia (13)	Brazil (23)	Chinese Taipei (2)	Nicaragua (16)

== Venues ==
The main tournament was held in four stadiums.

Pool A	Pool B & two quarterfinals	Pool C	Pool D, two quarterfinals, semifinals and final
San Juan, Puerto Rico	(United States) Houston, Texas	Tokyo, Japan	(United States) Miami, Florida
Hiram Bithorn Stadium	Daikin Park	Tokyo Dome	LoanDepot Park
Capacity: 19,125	Capacity: 41,168	Capacity: 45,600	Capacity: 36,742
2026 World Baseball Classic is located in Puerto Rico		2026 World Baseball Classic is located in the United States	
2026 World Baseball Classic is located in Japan		2026 World Baseball Classic is located in the United States	

== Pre-WBC friendly games ==
To prepare for the tournament, teams played friendly preparation games between November 2025 and March 2026.

=== 2025 ===
Friendly; Non-MLB Squads	November 8	Czech Republic	0–3	South Korea	Gocheok Sky Dome, Seoul, South Korea
Friendly; Non-MLB Squads	14:03 KST	LP: Jan Novák	Boxscore	WP: Kim Keon-woo; Sv: Jo Byeong-hyeon	Attendance: 16,100

Friendly; Non-MLB Squads	November 9	South Korea	11–1	Czech Republic	Gocheok Sky Dome, Seoul, South Korea
Friendly; Non-MLB Squads	14:00 KST	WP: Lee Min-seok; HR: Lee Jae-won (1)	Boxscore	LP: Thomas Ondra	Attendance: 16,100

Friendly; Non-MLB Squads	November 15	South Korea	4–11	Japan	Tokyo Dome, Japan
Friendly; Non-MLB Squads	18:36 JT	LP: Kim Taek-yeon; HR: Ahn Hyun-min (1), Song Sung-mun (1)	Boxscore	WP: Yuki Matsumoto; HR: Yukinori Kishida (1)	Attendance: 41,631

Friendly; Non-MLB Squads	November 16	Japan	7–7	South Korea	Tokyo Dome, Japan
Friendly; Non-MLB Squads	19:08 JT		Boxscore	HR: Ahn Hyun-min (2), Kim Ju-won (1)	Attendance: 41,627

=== 2026 ===
Friendly; CPBL Squads (Including non-roster invitees)	February 13	Chinese Taipei	3–2	TSG Hawks	Chengcing Lake Baseball Stadium, Kaohsiung, Taiwan
Friendly; CPBL Squads (Including non-roster invitees)	13:00 TST				Attendance: 12,000

Friendly; CPBL Squads (Including non-roster invitees)	February 14	Chinese Taipei	6–2	TSG Hawks	Chengcing Lake Baseball Stadium, Kaohsiung, Taiwan
Friendly; CPBL Squads (Including non-roster invitees)	13:00 TST				Attendance: 12,000

Friendly	February 19	Cuba	2–2	Nicaragua	Estádio Roberto Clemente; Masaya, Nicaragua
Friendly	16:00 CST				Attendance: 4,000

Friendly; Played in 7 innings	February 20	South Korea	3–4	Samsung Lions	ONNA Akama Ball Park, Onna, Japan
Friendly; Played in 7 innings	13:00 JST

Friendly	February 21	Australia	4–2	All-Ashikaga	Fuchū, Tokyo, Japan
Friendly	13:00 JST

Friendly; Played in 7 innings	February 21	South Korea	5–2	Hanwha Eagles	Kochinda Sports Park Baseball Field; Kochinda, Japan
Friendly; Played in 7 innings	12:00 JST

Friendly	February 21	Chinese Taipei	2–2	Kiwoom Heroes	Taipei Dome, Taipei, Taiwan

Friendly	February 22	Chinese Taipei	2–7	Kiwoom Heroes	Taipei Dome, Taipei, Taiwan

Friendly	February 22	Cuba	3–1	Nicaragua	Estadio Rigoberto López Pérez, León, Nicaragua
Friendly	14:00 CST

Friendly	February 22	Australia	5–0	All Fuchu	Fuchū, Tokyo, Japan
Friendly	12:00 JST

Friendly	February 22	Czech Republic	4–3	Chiba Lotte Marines (farm)	Miyakonojo City Municipal Baseball Stadium, Miyakonojo, Japan
Friendly	12:30 JST

Friendly	February 22	Japan	13–3	Fukuoka SoftBank Hawks	Sun Marine Stadium, Miyazaki, Japan
Friendly	13:00 JST

Friendly	February 23	Czech Republic	1–1	Chiba Lotte Marines (farm)	Miyakonojo City Municipal Baseball Stadium, Miyakonojo, Japan
Friendly	12:30 JST

Friendly	February 23	Japan	0–4	Fukuoka SoftBank Hawks	Sun Marine Stadium, Miyazaki, Japan
Friendly	14:00 JST

Friendly; Played in 7 innings	February 23	South Korea	7–4	Hanwha Eagles	Kadena Baseball Stadium, Kadena, Japan
Friendly; Played in 7 innings	13:00 JST

Friendly	February 24	Australia	9–1	Tokyo Metropolitan Police	Fuchū, Tokyo, Japan
Friendly	11:30 JST

Friendly; Played in 7 innings	February 24	KIA Tigers	3–6	South Korea	Kadena Baseball Stadium, Kadena, Japan
Friendly; Played in 7 innings	13:00 JST

Friendly	February 24	Chinese Taipei	5–3	Fubon Guardians	Taipei Dome, Taipei, Taiwan

Friendly	February 25	Cuba	1–6	Nicaragua	Estadio Yamil Rios Ugarte, Rivas, Nicaragua
Friendly	18:00 CST

Friendly	February 25	Australia	(F/Cancelled due to rain)	GOLD'S GYM JAPAN	Fuchū, Tokyo, Japan
Friendly	11:30 JST

Friendly	February 26	Australia	6–6	3GoodGroup HOZEN noLimiteds	Fuchū, Tokyo, Japan
Friendly	11:30 JST

Friendly	February 26	Samsung Lions	6–16	South Korea	Kadena Baseball Stadium, Kadena, Japan
Friendly	13:00 JST

Friendly	February 26	Czech Republic	4–18	Chiba Lotte Marines	Miyakonojo City Municipal Baseball Stadium, Miyakonojo, Japan
Friendly	12:30 JST

Friendly	February 26	Chinese Taipei	0–4	Fukuoka SoftBank Hawks	Taipei Dome, Taipei, Taiwan
Friendly	19:00 TST

Friendly	February 27	Japan	5–3	Chunichi Dragons	Vantelin Dome Nagoya, Nagoya, Japan
Friendly	19:00 JST

Friendly	February 27	Chinese Taipei	1–6	Hokkaido Nippon-Ham Fighters	Taipei Dome, Taipei, Taiwan
Friendly	15:00 TST

Friendly	February 27	Netherlands	4–5	Italy	Terry Park Ballfield, Fort Myers, Florida
Friendly	13:00 EST		Boxscore

Friendly	February 27	Cuba	6–0	Nicaragua	Estadio Nacional Soberanía, Managua, Nicaragua
Friendly	18:00 CST

Friendly	February 27	KT Wiz	(F/Cancelled due to rain)	South Korea	Kadena Baseball Stadium, Kadena, Japan
Friendly	13:00 JST

Friendly	February 28	Australia	0–2	Yokohama DeNA BayStars	Yokohama Stadium, Yokohama, Japan
Friendly	12:00 JST

Friendly	February 28	Japan	7–3	Chunichi Dragons	Vantelin Dome Nagoya, Nagoya, Japan
Friendly	19:00 JST

Friendly	March 2	Chinese Taipei	(F/Cancelled due to rain)	Orix Buffaloes (farm)	SOKKEN Stadium, Miyazaki, Japan
Friendly	11:00 JST

Friendly	March 2	Australia	(F/Cancelled due to rain)	Fukuoka SoftBank Hawks (farm)	Sun Marine Stadium, Miyazaki, Japan
Friendly	11:00 JST

Friendly	March 2	South Korea	3–3	Hanshin Tigers	Kyocera Dome Osaka, Osaka, Japan
Friendly	12:00 JST

Friendly	March 2	Czech Republic	(F/Cancelled due to rain)	Yomiuri Giants (farm)	Sun Marine Stadium, Miyazaki, Japan
Friendly	18:00 JST

Friendly	March 2	Japan	3–4	Orix Buffaloes	Kyocera Dome Osaka, Osaka, Japan
Friendly	19:00 JST	LP: Yusei Kikuchi; HR: Masataka Yoshida		WP: Naruki Teranishi

Friendly	March 3	Chinese Taipei	5–1	Fukuoka SoftBank Hawks (farm)	SOKKEN Stadium, Miyazaki, Japan
Friendly	11:00 JST

Friendly	March 3	Australia	5–1	Yomiuri Giants (farm)	Sun Marine Stadium, Miyazaki, Japan
Friendly	11:00 JST

Friendly	March 3	South Korea	8–5	Orix Buffaloes	Kyocera Dome Osaka, Osaka, Japan
Friendly	12:00 JST

Friendly	March 3	Czech Republic	3–8	Orix Buffaloes (farm)	Sun Marine Stadium, Miyazaki, Japan
Friendly	18:00 JST

Friendly	March 3	Japan	5–4	Hanshin Tigers	Kyocera Dome Osaka, Osaka, Japan
Friendly	19:00 JST

Friendly	March 3	Brazil	4–14 (F/7)	Athletics	Hohokam Stadium, Mesa, Arizona
Friendly	13:05 MST	LP: Bo Takahashi	Boxscore	WP: Aaron Civale; HR: Jeff McNeil, Austin Wynns	Attendance: 2,273; Umpires: Alex Tosi

Friendly	March 3	Venezuela	1–3	Houston Astros	Cacti Park of the Palm Beaches, West Palm Beach, Florida
Friendly	18:05 EST	LP: Amilcar Chirinos	Boxscore	WP: Sam Carlson; HR: Carlos Eduardo Pérez	Attendance: 4,000; Umpires: Edwin Moscoso

Friendly; Played over 10 innings	March 3	United States	15–1	San Francisco Giants	Scottsdale Stadium, Scottsdale, Arizona
Friendly; Played over 10 innings	13:05 MST	WP: Paul Skenes (1–0); HR: Alex Bregman (1), Roman Anthony (1)	Boxscore	LP: Adrian Houser (0–1)	Attendance: 9,720; Umpires: HP – Alfonso Márquez, 1B – Adrian Johnson, 2B – Scott Barry, 3B – Brian Walsh

Friendly	March 3	Italy	9–4	Chicago Cubs	Sloan Park, Mesa, Arizona
Friendly	13:05 MST	WP: Ron Marinaccio; HR: Owen Ayers, Thomas Saggese, Kyle Teel	Boxscore	LP: Jeff Brigham; HR: James Dansby Swanson	Attendance: 8,068; Umpires: Nick Mahrley

Friendly	March 3	Great Britain	7–3	Milwaukee Brewers	American Family Fields of Phoenix, Phoenix, Arizona
Friendly	13:10 MST	WP: Jack Seppings; HR: Harry Ford	Boxscore	LP: Jared Koenig; HR: Akil Baddoo, David Hamilton	Attendance: 2,688; Umpires: Charlie Welling

Friendly	March 3	Cuba	0–4	Kansas City Royals	Surprise Stadium, Surprise, Arizona
Friendly	13:05 MST	LP: Denny Larrondo	Boxscore	WP: Ryan Bergert; HR: Michael Massey	Attendance: 3,756; Umpires: Nestor Ceja

Friendly	March 3	Israel	1–0	Miami Marlins	Roger Dean Stadium, Jupiter, Florida
Friendly	13:10 EST	WP: Robert Stock; Sv: Daniel Federman	Boxscore	LP: Calvin Faucher	Attendance: 2,515; Umpires: Dan Merzel

Friendly	March 3	Nicaragua	3–6	New York Mets	Clover Park, Port St. Lucie, Florida
Friendly	13:10 EST	LP: Angel Obando; HR: Freddy Francisco Zamora, Brandon Leyton	Boxscore	WP: Luis Amado García; Sv: Jefry Yan; HR: Christopher Antonio Suero	Attendance: 3,509; Umpires: Hunter Wendelstedt

Friendly	March 3	Colombia	1–7	Pittsburgh Pirates	LECOM Park, Bradenton, Florida
Friendly	13:05 EST	LP: Danis Correa	Boxscore	WP: José Urquidy	Attendance: 3,819; Umpires: Will Little

Friendly	March 3	Netherlands	8–5	Baltimore Orioles	Ed Smith Stadium, Sarasota, Florida
Friendly	13:05 EST	WP: Ryjeteri Merite; Sv: Jacob Cravey; HR: Ray-Patrick Didder, Ceddanne Rafaela, Ozzie Albies	Boxscore	LP: Trevor Rogers; HR: Pete Alonso, Jeremiah Jackson	Attendance: 3,380; Umpires: Chris Segal

Friendly	March 3	Puerto Rico	5–3	Boston Red Sox	JetBlue Park, Lee County, Florida
Friendly	18:05 EST	WP: E. Rodríguez; Sv: Yacksel Ríos	Boxscore	LP: Jake Bennett	Attendance: 8,620; Umpires: John Libka

Friendly	March 3	Panama	1–11 (F/8)	New York Yankees	George M. Steinbrenner Field, Tampa, Florida
Friendly	13:05 EST	LP: Jorge García	Boxscore	WP: Max Fried; HR: J. C. Escarra	Attendance: 7,505; Umpires: Roberto Ortiz

Friendly	March 3	Canada	7–10	Toronto Blue Jays	TD Ballpark, Dunedin, Florida
Friendly	13:07 EST	LP: Brock Dykxhoorn; HR: Jacob Robson	Boxscore	WP: Jack Cushing; HR: Riley Tirotta	Attendance: 4,496; Umpires: Brennan Miller

Friendly	March 3	Mexico	6–3	Arizona Diamondbacks	Salt River Fields, Scottsdale, Arizona
Friendly	13:10 MST	WP: Luis Gastelum; Sv: Roel Octavio Ramírez; HR: Ryan John Tellez, Tadeo Alejandro Osuna	Boxscore	LP: Juan Diego Morillo	Attendance: 10,472; Umpires: Rob Drake

Friendly	March 3	Dominican Republic	12–4	Detroit Tigers	Estadio Quisqueya Juan Marichal, Santo Domingo, Dominican Republic
Friendly	19:05 AST	WP: Abner Uribe; HR: Junior Caminero, Manny Machado, Juan Soto	Boxscore	LP: Brant Hurter; HR: Kevin McGonigle	Attendance: 13,186; Umpires: John Libka

Friendly	March 4	Brazil	2–13 (F/7)	Texas Rangers	Surprise Stadium, Surprise, Arizona
Friendly	13:05 MST	LP: Vitor Takahashi; HR: Lucas Ramirez, Lucas Rojo	Boxscore	WP: Kumar Rocker; HR: Jake Burger, Cameron Cauley, Josh H. Smith (baseball) 2	Attendance: 2,823; Umpires: Charlie Ramos

Friendly	March 4	Venezuela	1–5	Washington Nationals	Cacti Park of the Palm Beaches, West Palm Beach, Florida
Friendly	18:05 EST	LP: Eduardo Rodriguez	Boxscore	WP: Foster Griffin; HR: Keibert Ruiz	Attendance: 2,658; Umpires: Carlos Torres

Friendly	March 4	United States	14–4 (F/8)	Colorado Rockies	Salt River Fields, Scottsdale, Arizona
Friendly	13:10 MST	WP: Carson Skipper; HR: Alex Bregman, Byron Buxton, Paul Goldschmidt, Aaron Judge, Will Smith	Boxscore	LP: Gabriel Hughes; HR: Kyle Karros, Mickey Moniak	Attendance: 11,803; Umpires: Dan Bellino

Friendly	March 4	Mexico	5–7	Los Angeles Dodgers	Camelback Ranch, Glendale, Arizona
Friendly	13:05 MST	LP: Luis Miranda	Boxscore	WP: Jack Dreyer; Sv: Ben Casparius; HR: Andy Pages	Attendance: 11,855; Umpires: Stu Scheurwater

Friendly	March 4	Great Britain	2–2	San Diego Padres	Peoria Stadium, Peoria, Arizona
Friendly	13:10 EST	HR: Jazz Chisholm Jr.	Boxscore		Attendance: 2,468; Umpires: Nate Tomlinson

Friendly	March 4	Cuba	2–19 (F/8)	Cincinnati Reds	Goodyear Ballpark, Goodyear, Arizona
Friendly	13:05 MST	LP: Julio Robaina	Boxscore	WP: Rhett Lowder; HR: JJ Bleday, Noelvi Marte, Sal Stewart	Attendance: 2,826; Umpires: Quinn Wolcott

Friendly	March 4	Italy	3–4	Los Angeles Angels	Tempe Diablo Stadium, Tempe, Arizona
Friendly	13:10 MST	LP: Camden Minacci; HR: Jon Berti	Boxscore	WP: Sam Bachman; HR: Jeimer Candelario, Jorge Soler	Attendance: 4,606; Umpires: Bill Miller

Friendly	March 4	Colombia	1–9	Atlanta Braves	CoolToday Park, North Port, Florida
Friendly	13:05 EST	LP: Luis Patiño	Boxscore	WP: Elieser Hernández; HR: Sandy León, Eli White	Attendance: 3,966; Umpires: Tyler Jones

Friendly	March 4	Israel	2–5	New York Mets	Clover Park, Port St. Lucie, Florida
Friendly	13:10 EST	LP: Jordan Geber; HR: Zach Levenson	Boxscore	WP: Nick Burdi; Sv: Saul Garcia; HR: Carson Benge	Attendance: 3,907; Umpires: Ron Kulpa

Friendly	March 4	Canada	5–3	Philadelphia Phillies	BayCare Ballpark, Clearwater, Florida
Friendly	13:05 EST	WP: Rob Zastryzny; Sv: Matt Wilkinson	Boxscore	LP: Jonathan Bowlan; HR: Alec Bohm	Attendance: 5,462; Umpires: Dan Iassogna

Friendly	March 4	Nicaragua	2–1	St. Louis Cardinals	Roger Dean Stadium, Jupiter, Florida
Friendly	13:05 EST	WP: J. C. Ramírez; Sv: Christian Worley; HR: Emanuel Trujillo	Boxscore	LP: Matthew Liberatore; HR: Andy Yerzy	Attendance: 3,424; Umpires: Emil Jimenez

Friendly	March 4	Netherlands	11–8	Tampa Bay Rays	Charlotte Sports Park, Port Charlotte, Florida
Friendly	13:05 EST	WP: Jamdrick Cornelia; Sv: Jacob Kmatz; HR: Ceddanne Rafaela	Boxscore	LP: Jake Woodford	Attendance: 2,001; Umpires: Ben May

Friendly	March 4	Panama	1–2	Detroit Tigers	Joker Marchant Stadium, Lakeland, Florida
Friendly	13:05 EST	LP: Abdiel Mendoza	Boxscore	WP: Jack Flaherty; HR: Kerry Carpenter	Attendance: 3,598; Umpires: Darius Ghani

Friendly	March 4	Puerto Rico	3–6	Minnesota Twins	Hammond Stadium, Lee County, Florida
Friendly	13:05 EST	LP: Raymond Burgos	Boxscore	WP: Zebby Matthews	Attendance: 4,608; Umpires: Brian O'Nora

Friendly	March 4	Dominican Republic	4–4	Detroit Tigers	Estadio Quisqueya Juan Marichal, Santo Domingo, Dominican Republic
Friendly	15:05 AST	HR: Juan Soto	Boxscore		Attendance: 11,500; Umpires: Clint Vondrak

== Pool stage ==
In each of the four pools, the top two teams qualified for the knockout stage. The teams finishing third and fourth achieved automatic qualification to the next WBC, while the team finishing last would be required to enter the qualifying phase for the next WBC.

The games were played at the dates and locations shown below.

Tiebreakers
The ranking of teams in the group stage is determined as follows:
1. Win percentage
2. Head-to-head record
3. Lowest quotient of runs allowed by defensive outs between tied teams
4. Lowest quotient of earned runs allowed by defensive outs between tied teams
5. Highest batting average between tied teams
6. Drawing of lots

=== Pool A ===
Pos	Team	Pld	W	L	RF	RA	PCT	GB	Qualification
1	Canada	4	3	1	21	10	.750 (Note: Canada defeated Puerto Rico, 3–2)	—	Advance to knockout stage
2	Puerto Rico (H)	4	3	1	15	7	.750	—	Advance to knockout stage
3	Cuba	4	2	2	13	16	.500	1	
4	Colombia	4	1	3	10	23	.250 (Note: Colombia defeated Panama, 4–3)	2	
5	Panama	4	1	3	11	14	.250	2	Requalification required for next WBC

Source: MLB
(H) Hosts
Notes:

Date	Local time	Road team	Score	Home team	Inn.	Venue	Game duration	Attendance	Boxscore
Mar 6, 2026	12:00 AST	Cuba	3–1	Panama		Hiram Bithorn Stadium	2:38	10,015	Boxscore
Mar 6, 2026	19:00 AST	Puerto Rico	5–0	Colombia		Hiram Bithorn Stadium	2:55	18,793	Boxscore
Mar 7, 2026	12:00 AST	Colombia	2–8	Canada		Hiram Bithorn Stadium	3:08	10,293	Boxscore
Mar 7, 2026	19:00 AST	Panama	3–4	Puerto Rico	10	Hiram Bithorn Stadium	3:26 (+0:24 delay)	18,925	Boxscore
Mar 8, 2026	12:00 AST	Colombia	4–7	Cuba		Hiram Bithorn Stadium	2:47	10,957	Boxscore
Mar 8, 2026	19:00 AST	Panama	4–3	Canada		Hiram Bithorn Stadium	3:08 (+1:25 delay)	15,649	Boxscore
Mar 9, 2026	12:00 AST	Colombia	4–3	Panama		Hiram Bithorn Stadium	3:15	9,790	Boxscore
Mar 9, 2026	19:00 AST	Cuba	1–4	Puerto Rico		Hiram Bithorn Stadium	2:53 (+1:13 delay)	19,189	Boxscore
Mar 10, 2026	19:00 AST	Canada	3–2	Puerto Rico		Hiram Bithorn Stadium	2:54 (+1:09 delay)	18,997	Boxscore
Mar 11, 2026	15:00 AST	Canada	7–2	Cuba		Hiram Bithorn Stadium	3:09	10,610	Boxscore

=== Pool B ===
Pos	Team	Pld	W	L	RF	RA	PCT	GB	Qualification
1	Italy	4	4	0	32	11	1.000	—	Advance to knockout stage
2	United States (H)	4	3	1	35	17	.750	1	Advance to knockout stage
3	Mexico	4	2	2	28	16	.500	2	
4	Great Britain	4	1	3	15	25	.250	3	
5	Brazil	4	0	4	6	47	.000	4	Requalification required for next WBC

Source: MLB
(H) Hosts

Date	Local time	Road team	Score	Home team	Inn.	Venue	Game duration	Attendance	Boxscore
Mar 6, 2026	12:00 CST	Mexico	8–2	Great Britain		Daikin Park	3:12	29,724	Boxscore
Mar 6, 2026	19:00 CST	United States	15–5	Brazil		Daikin Park	3:30	30,825	Boxscore
Mar 7, 2026	12:00 CST	Brazil	0–8	Italy		Daikin Park	2:47	29,357	Boxscore
Mar 7, 2026	19:00 CST	Great Britain	1–9	United States		Daikin Park	2:57	34,368	Boxscore
Mar 8, 2026	12:00 CDT	Great Britain	4–7	Italy		Daikin Park	3:06	35,141	Boxscore
Mar 8, 2026	19:00 CDT	Brazil	0–16	Mexico	6	Daikin Park	2:24	36,380	Boxscore
Mar 9, 2026	12:00 CDT	Brazil	1–8	Great Britain		Daikin Park	2:43	34,395	Boxscore
Mar 9, 2026	19:00 CDT	Mexico	3–5	United States		Daikin Park	3:04	41,628	Boxscore
Mar 10, 2026	20:00 CDT	Italy	8–6	United States		Daikin Park	3:08	38,653	Boxscore
Mar 11, 2026	18:00 CDT	Italy	9–1	Mexico		Daikin Park	3:09	39,894	Boxscore

=== Pool C ===
Pos	Team	Pld	W	L	RF	RA	PCT	GB	Qualification
1	Japan (H)	4	4	0	34	9	1.000	—	Advance to knockout stage
2	South Korea	4	2	2	28	19	.500 (Note: Runs allowed per defensive out between tied teams: South Korea .123 (7 runs/57 outs), Australia and Chinese Taipei .130 (7 runs/54 outs))	2	Advance to knockout stage
3	Australia	4	2	2	13	12	.500 (Note: Earned runs allowed per defensive out between tied teams: Australia .111 (6 earned runs/54 outs), Chinese Taipei .130 (7 earned runs/54 outs))	2	
4	Chinese Taipei	4	2	2	19	20	.500	2	
5	Czechia	4	0	4	5	39	.000	4	Requalification required for next WBC

Source: MLB
(H) Hosts
Notes:

Date	Local time	Road team	Score	Home team	Inn.	Venue	Game duration	Attendance	Boxscore
Mar 5, 2026	12:00 JST	Chinese Taipei	0–3	Australia		Tokyo Dome	2:15	40,523	Boxscore
Mar 5, 2026	19:00 JST	Czechia	4–11	South Korea		Tokyo Dome	2:39	19,920	Boxscore
Mar 6, 2026	12:00 JST	Australia	5–1	Czechia		Tokyo Dome	2:17	21,514	Boxscore
Mar 6, 2026	19:00 JST	Japan	13–0	Chinese Taipei	7	Tokyo Dome	2:36	42,314	Boxscore
Mar 7, 2026	12:00 JST	Chinese Taipei	14–0	Czechia	7	Tokyo Dome	2:20	40,522	Boxscore
Mar 7, 2026	19:00 JST	South Korea	6–8	Japan		Tokyo Dome	3:04	42,318	Boxscore
Mar 8, 2026	12:00 JST	Chinese Taipei	5–4	South Korea	10	Tokyo Dome	2:58	40,584	Boxscore
Mar 8, 2026	19:00 JST	Australia	3–4	Japan		Tokyo Dome	2:33	42,331	Boxscore
Mar 9, 2026	19:00 JST	South Korea	7–2	Australia		Tokyo Dome	3:01	32,908	Boxscore
Mar 10, 2026	19:00 JST	Czechia	0–9	Japan		Tokyo Dome	2:36	42,340	Boxscore

=== Pool D ===
Pos	Team	Pld	W	L	RF	RA	PCT	GB	Qualification
1	Dominican Republic	4	4	0	41	10	1.000	—	Advance to knockout stage
2	Venezuela	4	3	1	26	12	.750	1	Advance to knockout stage
3	Israel	4	2	2	15	23	.500	2	
4	Netherlands	4	1	3	9	27	.250	3	
5	Nicaragua	4	0	4	6	25	.000	4	Requalification required for next WBC

Source: MLB

Date	Local time	Road team	Score	Home team	Inn.	Venue	Game duration	Attendance	Boxscore
Mar 6, 2026	12:00 EST	Netherlands	2–6	Venezuela		LoanDepot Park	2:54	19,542	Boxscore
Mar 6, 2026	19:00 EST	Nicaragua	3–12	Dominican Republic		LoanDepot Park	3:20	35,127	Boxscore
Mar 7, 2026	12:00 EST	Nicaragua	3–4	Netherlands		LoanDepot Park	2:45	16,897	Boxscore
Mar 7, 2026	19:00 EST	Israel	3–11	Venezuela		LoanDepot Park	2:37	22,573	Boxscore
Mar 8, 2026	12:00 EDT	Netherlands	1–12	Dominican Republic	7	LoanDepot Park	2:23	32,324	Boxscore
Mar 8, 2026	19:00 EDT	Nicaragua	0–5	Israel		LoanDepot Park	2:45	17,972	Boxscore
Mar 9, 2026	12:00 EDT	Dominican Republic	10–1	Israel		LoanDepot Park	2:47	28,728	Boxscore
Mar 9, 2026	19:00 EDT	Venezuela	4–0	Nicaragua		LoanDepot Park	2:27	27,844	Boxscore
Mar 10, 2026	19:00 EDT	Israel	6–2	Netherlands		LoanDepot Park	2:57	13,565	Boxscore
Mar 11, 2026	20:00 EDT	Dominican Republic	7–5	Venezuela		LoanDepot Park	3:03	36,230	Boxscore

== Knockout stage ==
The top two teams from each pool advanced to the single-elimination bracket. Houston hosted two quarterfinal games while Miami hosted the rest of the knockout stage.

=== Bracket ===
Quarterfinals
March 14 – Miami
Venezuela	8
Japan	5
March 14 – Houston
Puerto Rico	6
Italy	8
March 13 – Houston
United States	5
Canada	3
March 13 – Miami
South Korea	0
Dominican Republic (F/7)	10

Semifinals
March 16 – Miami
Venezuela	4
Italy	2
March 15 – Miami
United States	2
Dominican Republic	1

Final
March 17 – Miami
Venezuela	3
United States	2

=== Quarterfinals ===
Date	Local time	Road team	Score	Home team	Inn.	Venue	Game duration	Attendance	Boxscore
Mar 13, 2026	18:30 EDT	South Korea	0–10	Dominican Republic	7	LoanDepot Park	2:17	30,805	Boxscore
Mar 13, 2026	19:00 CDT	United States	5–3	Canada		Daikin Park	2:55	38,054	Boxscore
Mar 14, 2026	14:00 CDT	Puerto Rico	6–8	Italy		Daikin Park	3:32	34,291	Boxscore
Mar 14, 2026	21:00 EDT	Venezuela	8–5	Japan		LoanDepot Park	3:07	34,548	Boxscore

=== Semifinals ===
Date	Local time	Road team	Score	Home team	Inn.	Venue	Game duration	Attendance	Boxscore
Mar 15, 2026	20:00 EDT	United States	2–1	Dominican Republic		LoanDepot Park	2:55	36,337	Boxscore
Mar 16, 2026	20:00 EDT	Venezuela	4–2	Italy		LoanDepot Park	2:42	35,382	Boxscore

=== Final ===
March 17, 2026, 20:00 EDT (UTC−4) at LoanDepot Park in Miami, Florida, United States
Team	1	2	3	4	5	6	7	8	9	R	H	E
Venezuela	0	0	1	0	1	0	0	0	1	3	6	0
United States	0	0	0	0	0	0	0	2	0	2	3	0
WP: Andrés Machado (1–0) LP: Garrett Whitlock (0–1) Sv: Daniel Palencia (3); Home runs: VEN: Wilyer Abreu (2); USA: Bryce Harper (1); Attendance: 36,190; Umpires: HP: Dan Bellino, 1B: Cory Blaser, 2B: Jeremie Rehak, 3B: Chris Graham, LF: Delfin Colon, RF: Cuti Suarez; Boxscore

== Final standings ==
The final standings were calculated by the WBSC for inclusion in the WBSC Men's Baseball World Rankings system.

Rk	Team	W	L	Tiebreaker
1st place, gold medalist(s)	Venezuela	6	1	–
2nd place, silver medalist(s)	United States	5	2	–
Lost in semifinals
3rd place, bronze medalist(s)	Dominican Republic	5	1	RA/Outs = 0.081
4	Italy	5	1	RA/Outs = 0.129
Lost in quarterfinals
5	Japan	4	1	–
6	Canada	3	2	Canada defeated Puerto Rico 3–2
7	Puerto Rico	3	2	Canada defeated Puerto Rico 3–2
8	South Korea	2	3	–
3rd place in pool
9	Australia	2	2	RA/Outs = 0.114
10	Cuba	2	2	RA/Outs = 0.152
11	Mexico	2	2	RA/Outs = 0.167
12	Israel	2	2	RA/Outs = 0.219
4th place in pool
13	Chinese Taipei	2	2	–
14	Colombia	1	3	RA/Outs = 0.225
15	Great Britain	1	3	RA/Outs = 0.245
16	Netherlands	1	3	RA/Outs = 0.276
5th place in pool
17	Panama	1	3	–
18	Nicaragua	0	4	RA/Outs = 0.248
19	Czech Republic	0	4	RA/Outs = 0.406
20	Brazil	0	4	RA/Outs = 0.511

2026 World Baseball Classic champions

Venezuela
First title

== Qualification for 2028 Summer Olympics ==
On February 9, 2026, the WBSC announced that the tournament would serve as the only Olympic qualifier for teams from the Americas. The top two teams would join the hosting United States at the 2028 Olympic baseball tournament. The three remaining qualification spots, for participants from other regions, would be determined at qualification events taking place between November 2027 and March 2028.

Team	Qualified on	Previous appearances in Summer Olympics
Dominican Republic	March 13, 2026	3 (1984, 1992, 2020)
Venezuela	March 14, 2026	0 (debut)

== All-tournament team ==
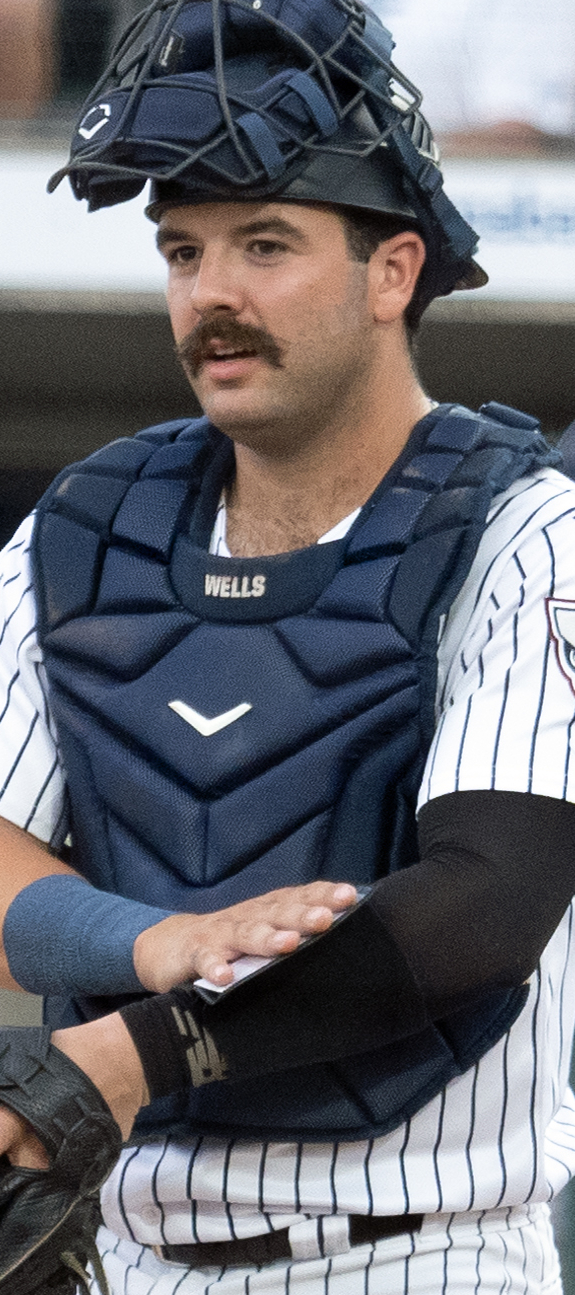
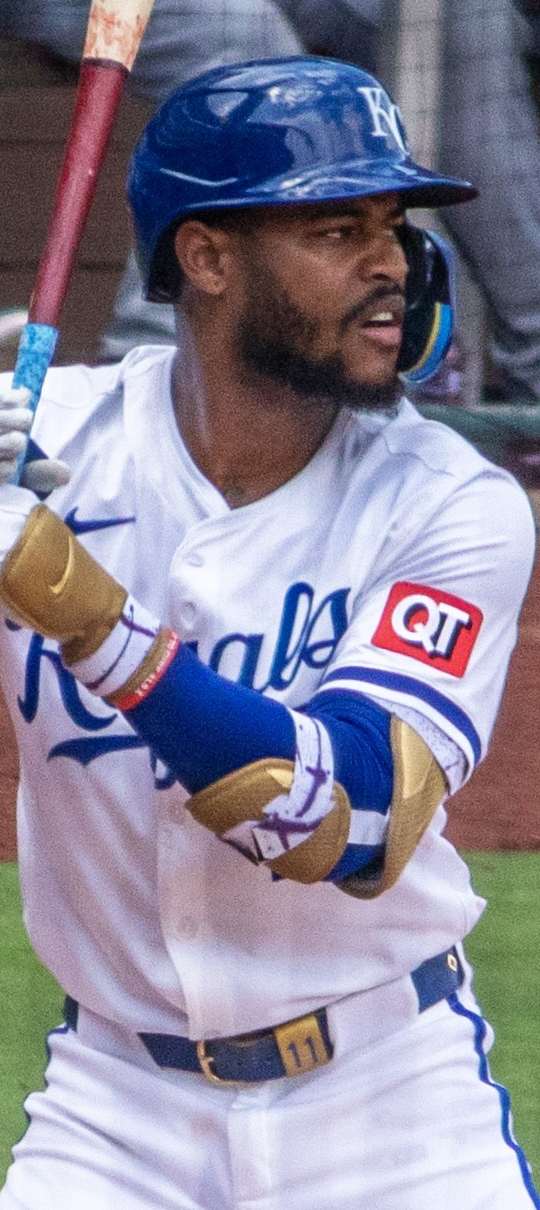
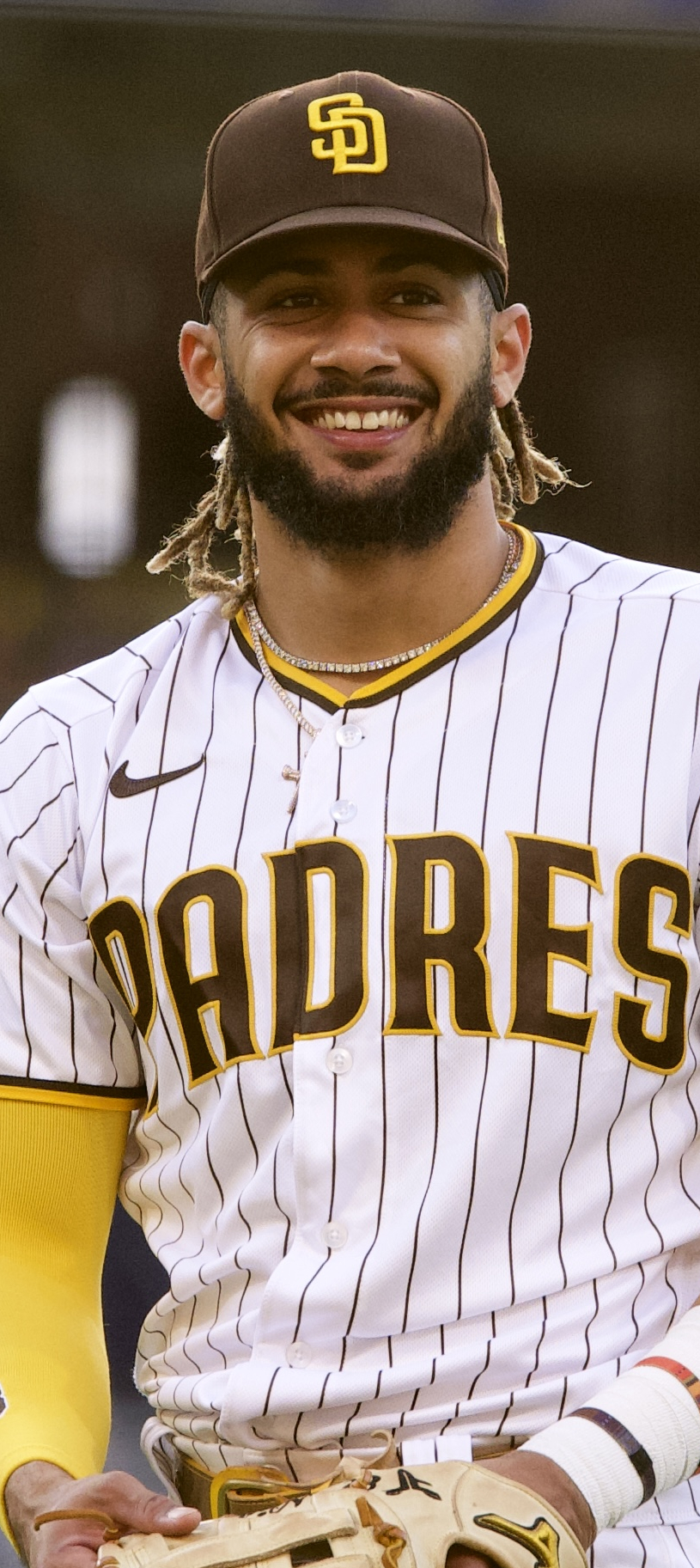
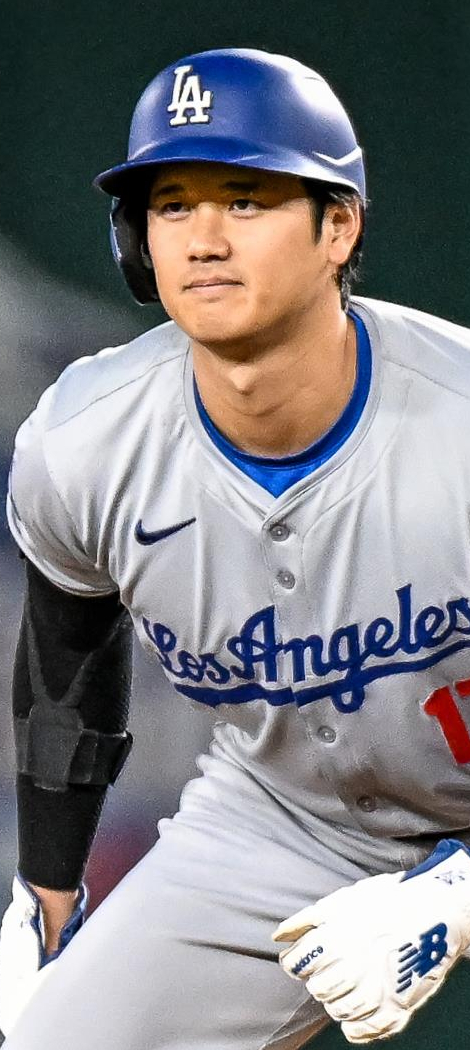
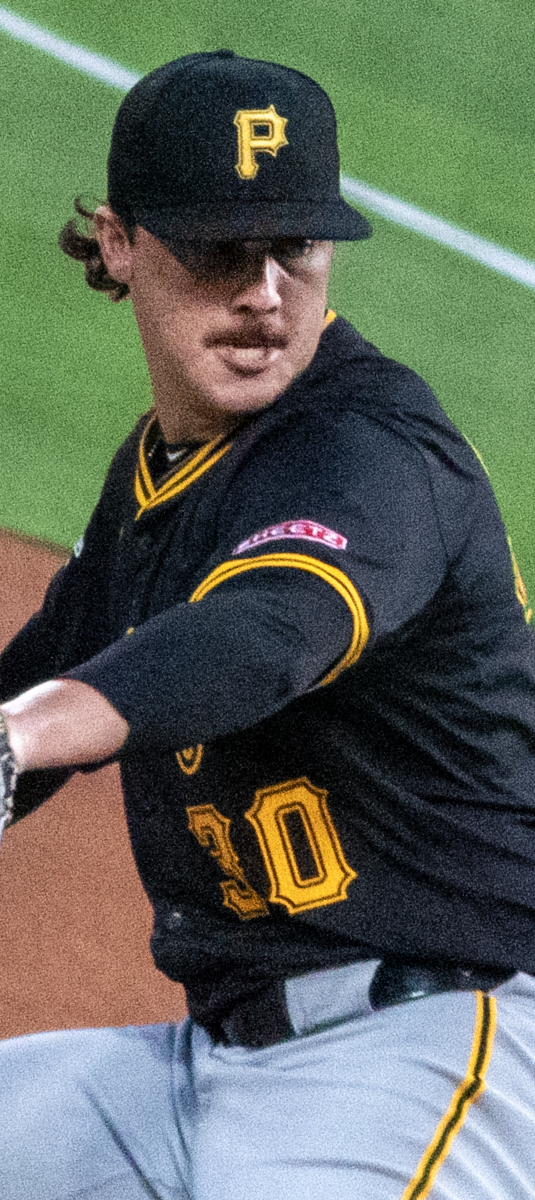
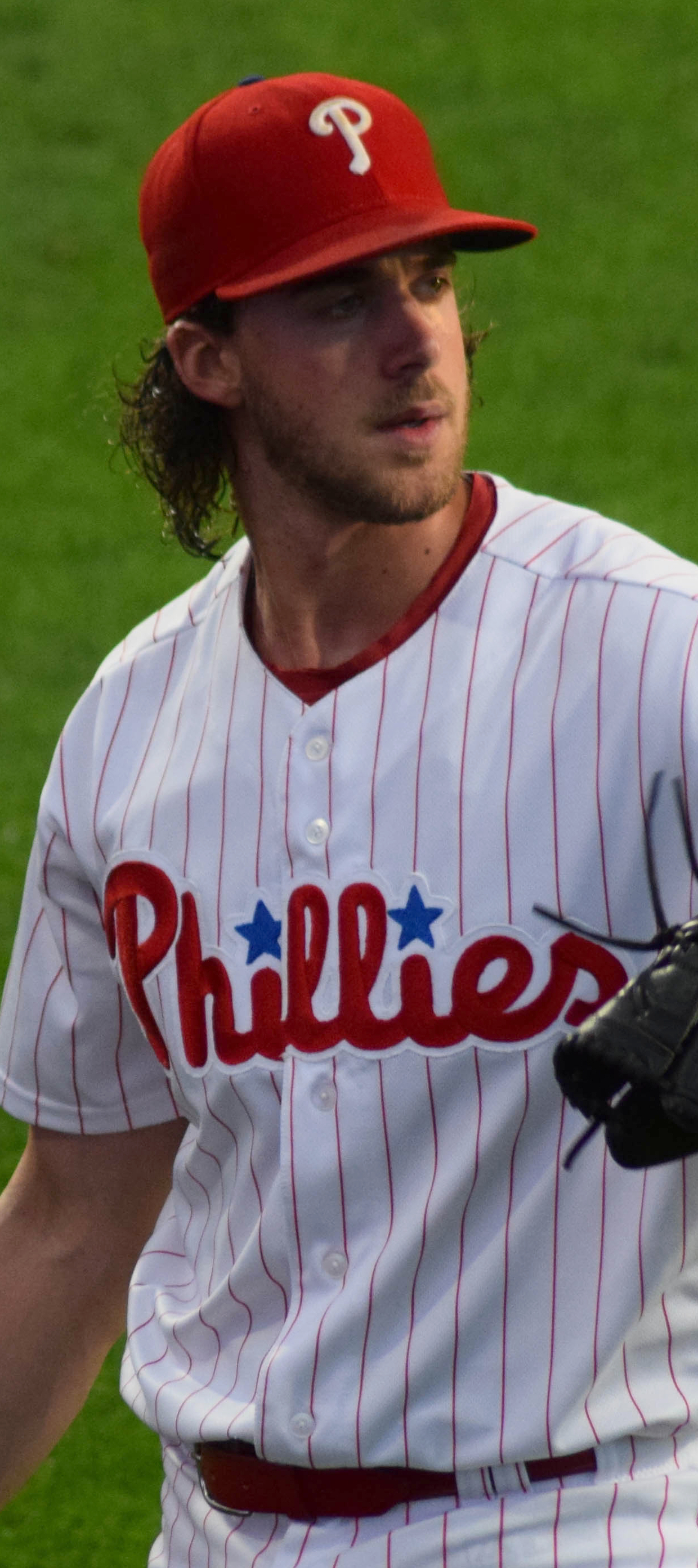
Players named to the All-WBC Team (from left to right);
Catcher – Austin Wells of the Dominican Republic
Third baseman – Maikel García of Venezuela (also named Most Valuable Player of the tournament)
Outfielder – Fernando Tatís Jr. of the Dominican Republic
Designated Hitter – Shohei Ohtani of Japan
Pitcher – Paul Skenes of the United States
Pitcher – Aaron Nola of Italy

Position	Player
C	(Dominican Republic) Austin Wells
1B	(Venezuela) Luis Arráez
2B	(United States) Brice Turang
3B	(Venezuela) Maikel García (MVP)
SS	(Venezuela) Ezequiel Tovar
OF	(United States) Roman Anthony
OF	(Dominican Republic) Fernando Tatís Jr.
OF	(Italy) Dante Nori
DH	(Japan) Shohei Ohtani
P	(United States) Paul Skenes
P	(United States) Logan Webb
P	(Italy) Aaron Nola

== Statistical leaders ==
=== Batting ===
Statistic	Name	Total/Avg
Batting average*	(Japan) Sōsuke Genda	.500
Hits	(Venezuela) Maikel Garcia	10
Runs	(Venezuela) Ronald Acuña Jr.	10
Doubles	(Venezuela) Luis Arráez (United States) Brice Turang	4
Triples	6 tied with (Note: Sam Antonacci, Yiddi Cappe, Jarryd Dale, Erik González, Garrett Stubbs, and Abraham Toro)	1
Home runs	4 tied with	3
Runs batted in	(South Korea) Moon Bo-gyeong (Dominican Republic) Fernando Tatis Jr.	11
Strikeouts	5 tied with (Note: Bryce Harper, Edouard Julien, Kim Ju-won, Victor Mascai, and Park Dong-won)	8
Stolen bases	(Chinese Taipei) Tsung-Che Cheng	4
On-base percentage*	(Japan) Sōsuke Genda	.667
Slugging percentage*	(Japan) Shohei Ohtani	1.231
OPS*	(Japan) Shohei Ohtani	1.842

* Minimum 2.7 plate appearances per team game

=== Pitching ===
Statistic	Name	Total/Avg
Wins	(Venezuela) Enmanuel De Jesus (United States) Paul Skenes (United States) Logan Webb	2
Losses	47 tied with	1
Saves	(Venezuela) Daniel Palencia (Italy) Greg Weissert	3
Innings pitched	(Italy) Aaron Nola	9
Hits allowed	(Brazil) Eric Pardinho	10
Runs allowed	(Czech Republic) Jan Novák	9
Earned runs allowed	(Czech Republic) Jan Novák	9
Earned run average*	11 tied with	0.00
Walks	(Brazil) Joseph Contreras (Brazil) João Gabriel Marostica	6
Strikeouts	(Dominican Republic) Cristopher Sánchez	12
WHIP*	(Nicaragua) Danilo Bermúdez	0.38

* Minimum 0.8 innings pitched per team game

== Broadcasting ==
Sport24 secured the rights for international in-flight and cruise ship travel.

Territory	Rights holder(s)	Ref.
Australia, New Zealand, and Oceania	ESPN	
Austria, Germany, Liechtenstein, Luxembourg, and Switzerland	Sportdigital	
Brazil	ESPN and Disney+	
Canada	Sportsnet (English)	
Canada	TVA Sports (French)	
Caribbean	ESPN and Disney+	
China	BesTV, Douyin, MIGU, Tencent Video, Fujian TV, and Youku	
Colombia	Caracol HD2, (Note: Colombia games only) Ditu (Note: Colombia games only)	
Cuba	Tele Rebelde	
Czechia	Česká Televize	
Dominican Republic	VTV 32, Tele Antillas, and Coral 39	
France	beIN Sports	
Hungary	Sport1	
Ireland and United Kingdom	TNT Sports	
Israel	Sports 5	
Italy and San Marino	Sky Sport Italy and RAI 2/RAI Sport	
Japan	Netflix	
Japan	Nippon Hoso, (Note: all Japan games) Bunka Hōsō, (Note: one quarterfinal, one semifinal, and the final) and Radiko (Audio Only)	
South Korea	TVING, tvN/tvN Sports, KBS, SBS, and MBC	
Latin America	ESPN and Disney+	
Latin America	1 Baseball Network (Note: except Mexico)	
Macau and Southeast Asia	SPOTV	
MENA	beIN Sports	
Mexico	TelevisaUnivision and ESPN (Note: All Mexico games, one semifinal, and the final on Canal 5, Nueve, or ViX)	
Netherlands	ESPN	
Nicaragua	Viva Nicaragua	
Panama	RPC and TV Max	
Puerto Rico	WAPA Deportes	
Sub-Saharan Africa	ESPN and Disney+	
Taiwan	ELTA, (Note: Official broadcasters; for CHT MOD and OTT (ELTA.tv and Hami Video)) EBC, TTV, (Note: Terrestrial and cable TV broadcast only) and Videoland	
Turkey	S Sport	
United States	Fox Sports (English)	
United States	Fox Deportes (Spanish)	
Venezuela	Televen, IVC, ByM Sport and Venevisión.	

== Controversies and storylines ==
=== Netflix deal in Japan ===
In Japan, Netflix acquired the exclusive rights to the tournament for an estimated 15 billion yen. Previously, the World Baseball Classic had been split between free-to-air (FTA) television and the pay television channel J Sports, with Japan's games usually being the only ones broadcast by FTA channels. Netflix subcontracted production of the broadcasts to Nippon Television.

The Netflix agreement faced a mixed reaction among fans and critics, as it marked the first time that Japan's WBC games would not be available on FTA television. Bars raised concerns that they would not be able to stream the tournament at their establishments due to Netflix's terms of service prohibiting commercial use, with some venues electing to do so discreetly in order to evade detection and legal complaints. As another workaround, some karaoke parlors enabled the ability for patrons to sign into the Netflix app in their private booths, so that they could watch the tournament with their friends. Netflix announced that it would offer a one-month subscription for 500 yen (approximately US$3.16) during March as a promotional offer for the tournament, and also organized public viewing parties in collaboration with venues such as Aeon and pub chain The HUB.

Some critics argued that negative reception to the deal was a form of Galápagos syndrome, noting that streaming was more prevalent among younger audiences than traditional television, the fact that non-Japan games would be available on a cheaper, over-the-top platform, and that Netflix was a well-known outlet internationally. Others believed that the lack of WBC coverage on television would reduce fatigue from the excessive media coverage of Shohei Ohtani by Japanese terrestrial networks.

According to the Japanese newspaper Nikkei, the number of Netflix mobile app downloads grew about five times higher than in March of the prior year.

Free coverage was also available via radio, with Nippon Broadcasting System holding rights to all Japan's games, and Nippon Cultural Broadcasting broadcasting one quarterfinal, one semifinal, and the final, regardless of whether Japan played or not, streaming service Radiko showing both radio stations audios. As part of its subcontract to produce the telecasts, Nippon Television also received the rights to produce a series of specials following the tournament.

=== Baseball's "Dream Team" and later disappointment ===
The success of the 2017 and 2023 tournaments resulted in more MLB players interested in playing for their national teams. For the 2026 tournament, the United States had significantly better players, especially pitchers, than previous editions. Some have compared the 2026 United States team to the Avengers or the 1992 United States men's Olympic basketball team, known as the "Dream Team".

But from February, support for the American team started to sour; first, it was announced that American pitcher Tarik Skubal had decided to pitch only a single game before returning to spring training with the Detroit Tigers. A few hours later, that game was announced as a group pool stage game against Great Britain. The decision was met with controversy, with fans calling Skubal a "quitter" and wondering if it would be better to pick another pitcher in his place.

Skubal blamed the calendar, saying, "If this tournament were in the middle of season, like if it was [Olympic] hockey, I'd had no problem playing those games".

Later in the tournament, fan scrutiny increased in part due to a statement by Bryce Harper comparing the tournament with the Olympics. This sparked discussion about American players' commitment to a team, which had also been questioned in prior WBC editions.

The peak of debate went after the loss over Italy during group pool play. Prior to the U.S.–Italy game, U.S. manager Mark DeRosa erroneously mentioned in an interview with MLB Network that Team USA had qualified for the quarterfinals, though no spot had been clinched at the time. DeRosa also allowed players to celebrate the early qualification, contributing to a loss against Italy that left the U.S. team's fate in jeopardy.

The U.S. ended up qualifying for the quarterfinals after Mexico lost to the same Italian team. Following this, a win against Canada and a controversial win over the Dominican Republic guaranteed a spot in the championship game.

After the loss in the final to Venezuela, fans called for DeRosa to step down from the national team, even if he wanted to manage Team USA for the next WBC.

=== Insurance rule debate and Puerto Rico roster issues ===
Could we participate with 10 horrible (players) for fear that there will be some kind of retaliation? Or does the dignity of Puerto Rico have some kind of value or price?

— Jose Quiles, President of Puerto Rican Baseball Federation

If players are on Major League Baseball 40-man rosters, they must have an insurance policy that compensates teams (in case a player is injured during the tournament) (Note: 2 years for position players, 4 years for pitchers) or else have a written waiver allowing the player to play. The reasons to refuse a player are various, but often related to age, extensive injury history or recent injuries. Most of WBC and MLB-related insurances are issued by National Financial Partners, an Aon company.

This rule has long been a point of contention for fans, teams, and organizers, because it often affects the performance of teams and makes teams heavily dependent on knowing the eligibility of a player beforehand. For example, in 2023, Clayton Kershaw was not allowed to play for Team USA due to an insurance refusal, but was allowed to play in 2026 because he is now technically classified as a free agent due to his retirement following the 2025 MLB season.

The rule reached another boiling point in 2026 due to widespread insurance refusal among players, such as Jose Altuve and Miguel Rojas of Venezuela.

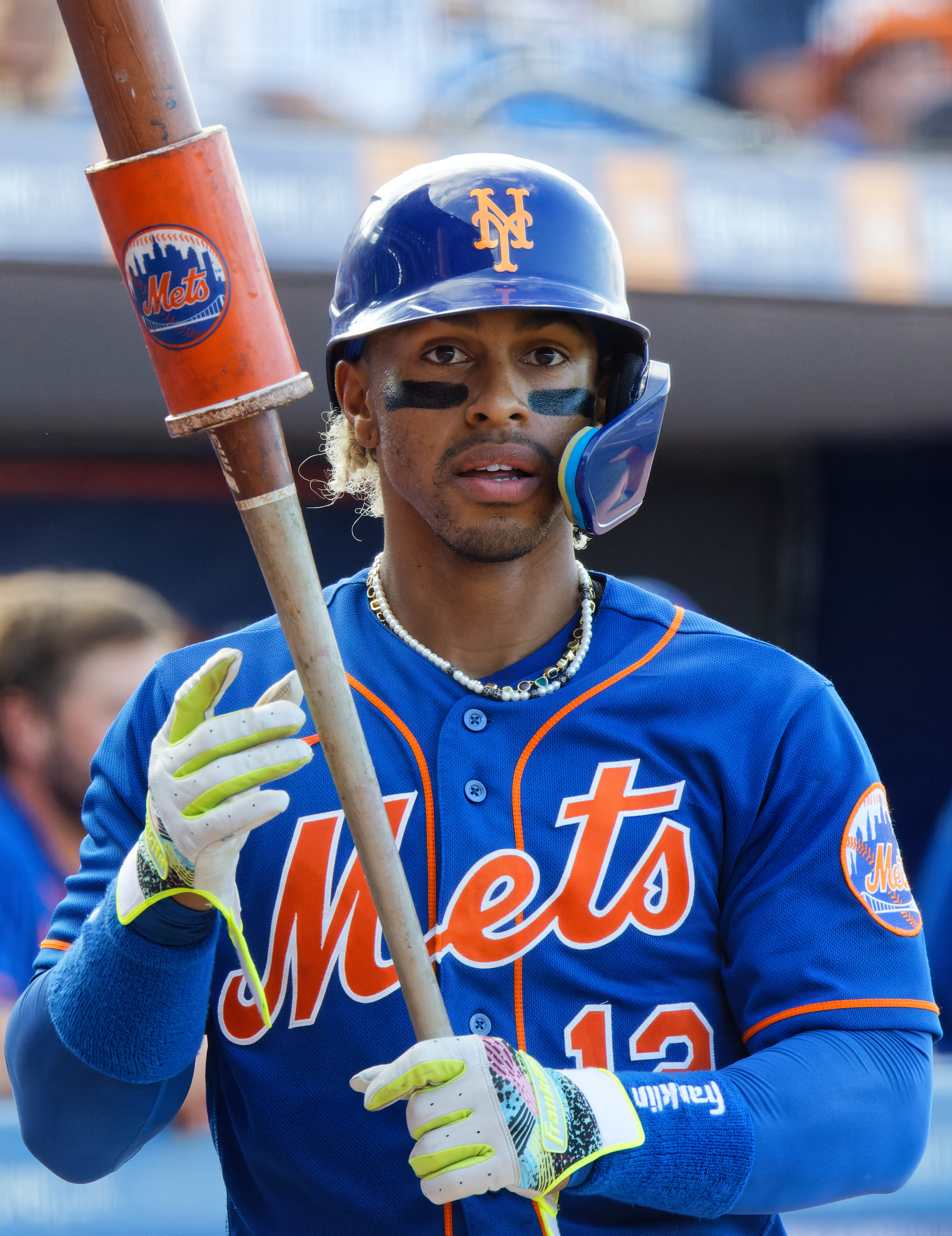
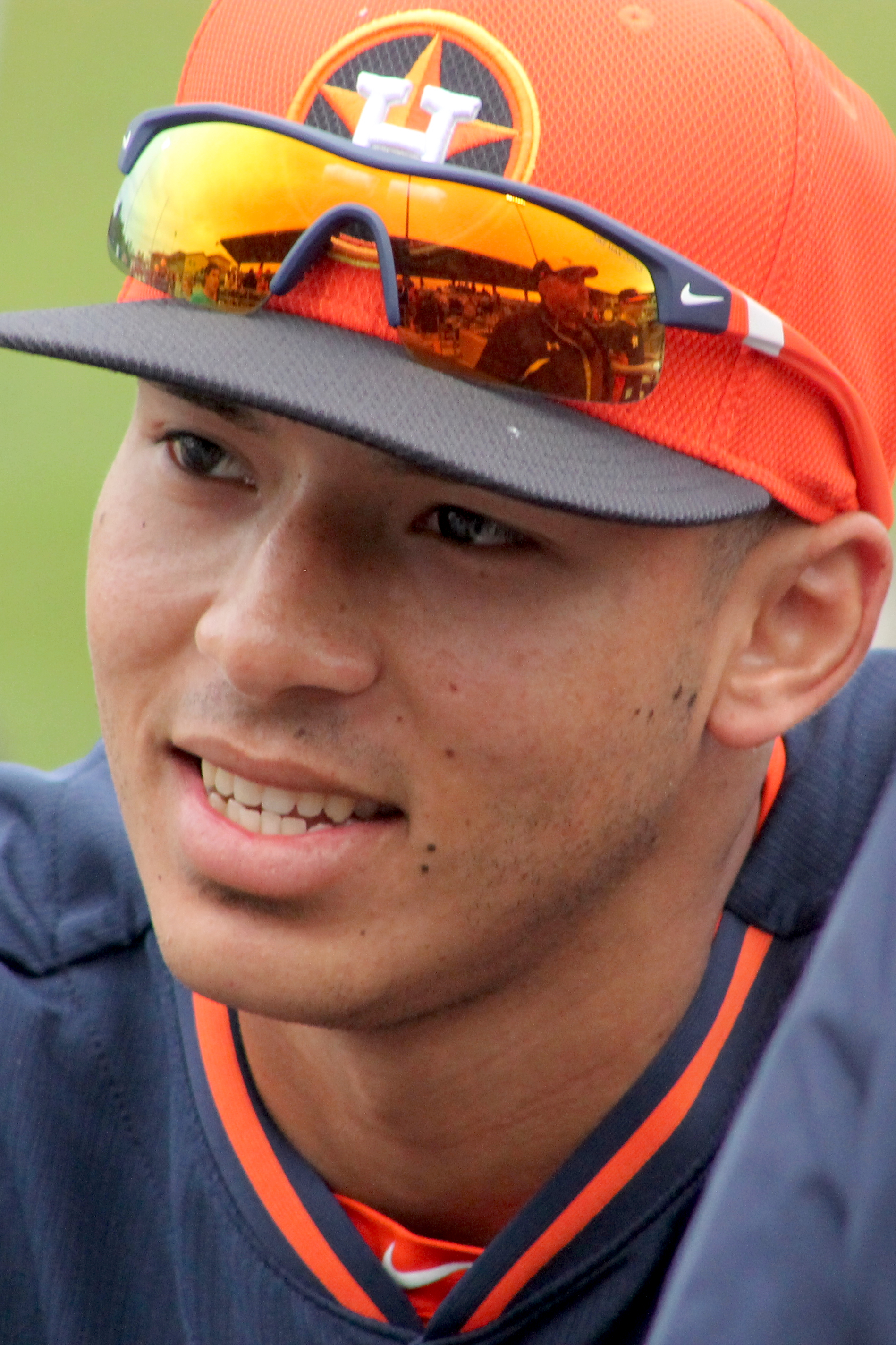
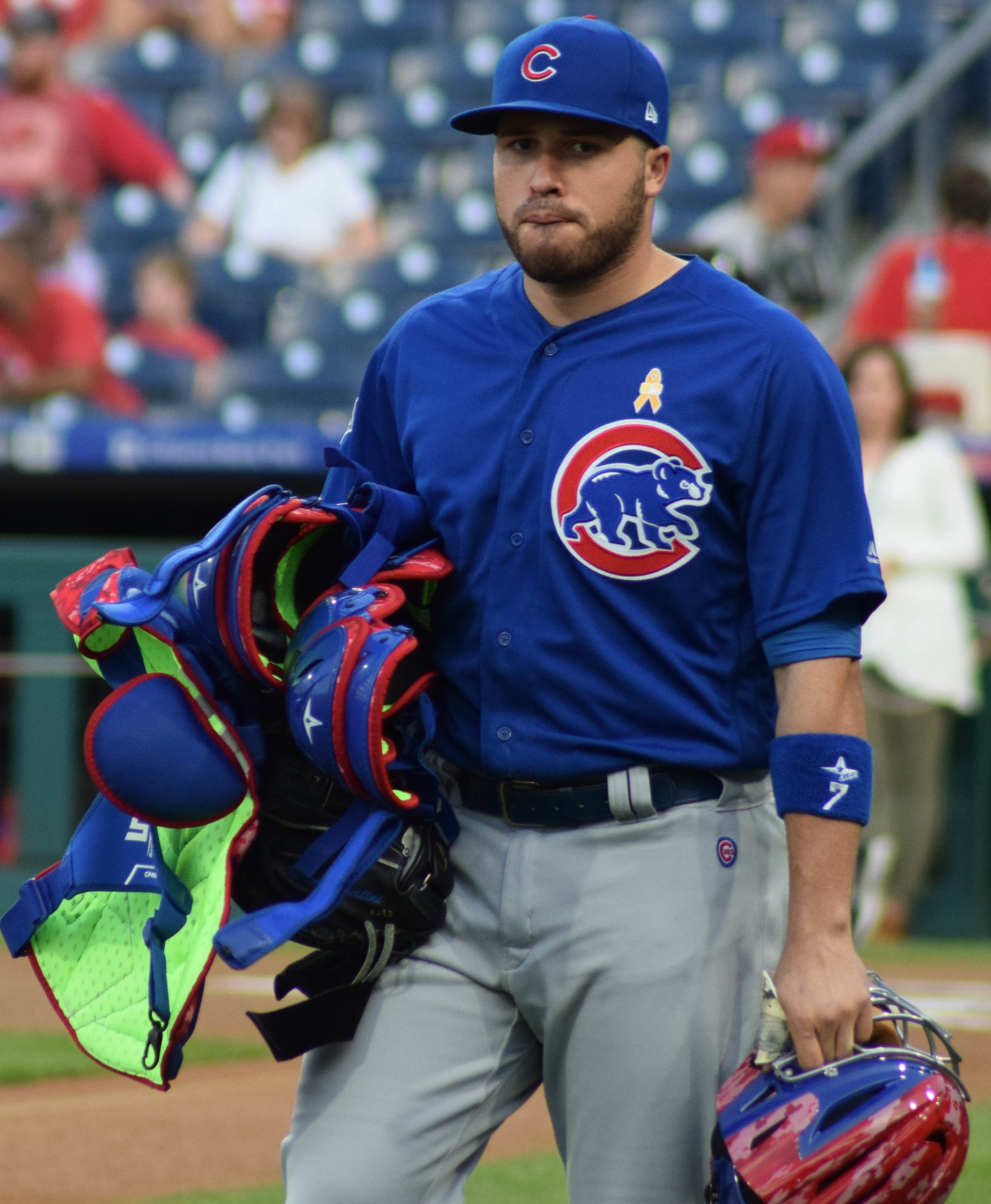
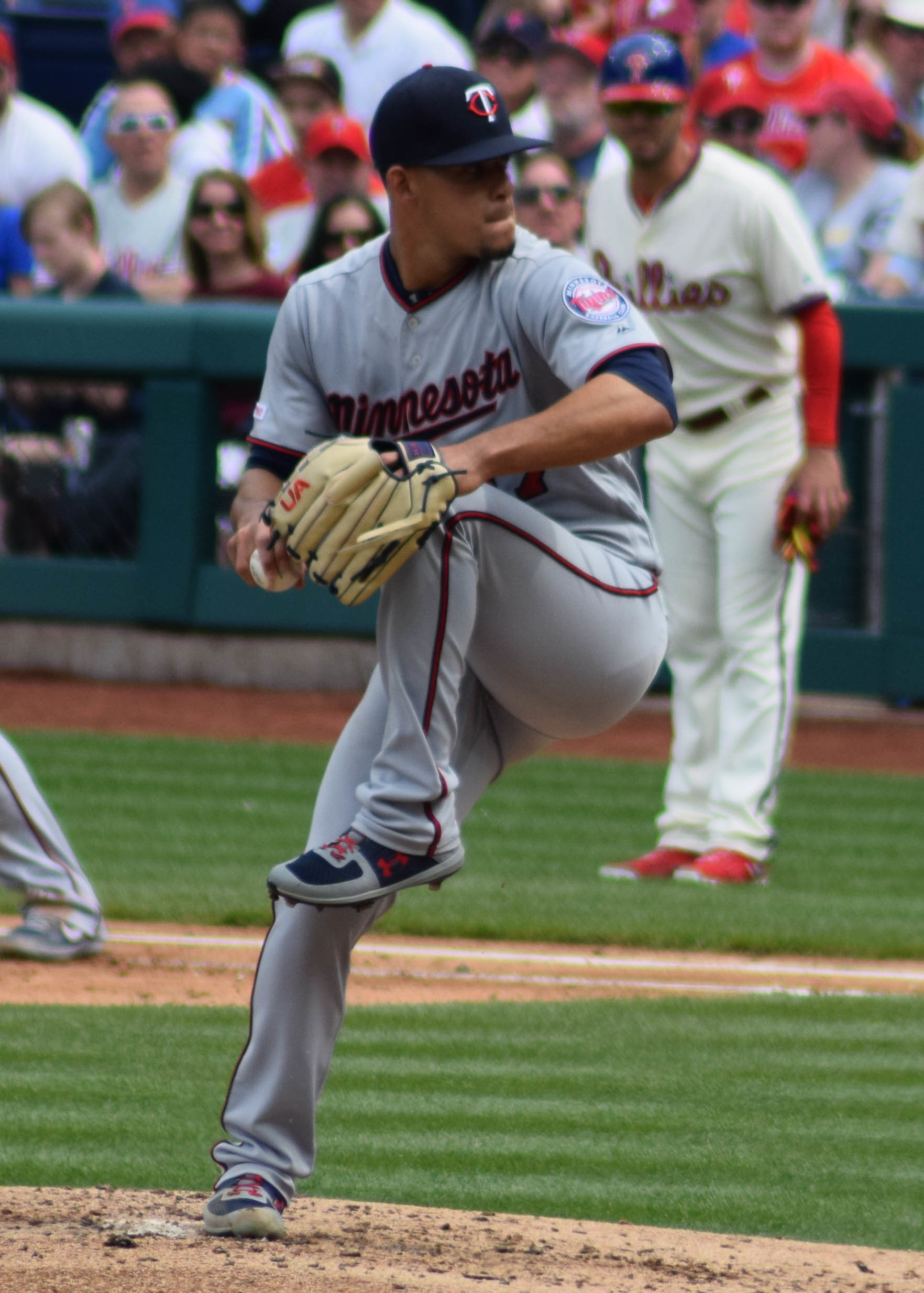
Puerto Rico's Francisco Lindor (top left), Carlos Correa (top right), Víctor Caratini (bottom left) and José Berríos were all prevented from playing in the tournament for insurance reasons.

Team Puerto Rico suffered from the refusal of several potential players, such as Francisco Lindor and Carlos Correa. The impact on the team prompted fans to boycott the tournament, and the federation, alongside the local government, considered withdrawing from the tournament completely due to the insurance issues with the players. The situation quickly escalated to WBC and MLB leaderships, resulting in an emergency meeting with Puerto Rico on the afternoon of January 31. After the meeting, it was reported that World Baseball Classic Inc. (WBCI), MLB, and the Major League Baseball Players Association (MLBPA) were negotiating with insurers to change some decisions. On February 1, another meeting was held between MLB and Puerto Rican federation. Reports indicated that the Puerto Rican federation and local businesspeople were working to secure backup insurance in case the original insurance re-refused the players, but the three players asked by Puerto Rico were unable to be selected due to the insurance rules.

The president of WBSC Americas and Venezuelan Baseball Federation, Aracelis León, also voiced her displeasure at the insurance issues on February 1, asking WBCI and MLBPA to fix the situation. Lindor was ruled out for the Classic on February 11, due to having surgery on his hand for a hamate bone injury.

=== Visa denials for Cuban staff ===
The Baseball Federation of Cuba announced on February 25, 2026, that American officials had denied visas to eight members of its traveling party, including the organization's president and general secretary due to the ongoing 2026 Cuban crisis. The visa denials were tied to the tightening of immigration policies, which currently require specialized licensing for Cuban team officials to enter the U.S. All Cuban players and coaches were cleared to enter the country due to visa exemptions for athletes and coaches participating in big sporting tournaments, Olympic qualifiers, and events supported by Major League Baseball.

=== Non-usage of ABS ===
As was the case in recent WBCs, the 2026 tournament uses the regular season MLB rules of the prior year's season. This meant that the Automated Ball-Strike System (ABS) challenge rules would not be in play for the 2026 WBC.

Following the opening game of the tournament between Chinese Taipei and Australia, umpire Omar Peralta was heavily criticized by Taiwanese fans and media for missing key calls, leading Taiwanese media to describe his strike-zone as an "amoeba". Chinese Taipei ended up losing 0–3 against Australia, in one of the most critical games of Pool C, which caused the controversy to deepen and raised calls for an early adoption of ABS.

On March 4, 2026, Ronald Acuña Jr. mistakenly tried to use the ABS challenge system, in Venezuela's pre-tournament exhibition game against the Houston Astros.

On March 15, 2026, the Dominican Republic lost to the United States in the semifinal on a controversial strike during a full count where had it been reviewed and called correctly, would have allowed Geraldo Perdomo to walk as it was a ball. This led to further calls to implement ABS during the tournament.

=== Taiwanese Premier Cho Jung-tai's visit ===
In March 2026, Taiwanese Premier Cho Jung-tai made a personal trip to Tokyo to watch the 2026 World Baseball Classic, marking the first time the Taiwanese Premier visited Japan since diplomatic relations were severed in 1972. Chinese Ministry of Foreign Affairs spokesperson Guo Jiakun criticized the visit as having "evil designs" and warned "Japan's indulgence in provocation ... will inevitably come at a cost". The Japanese government defended the trip as a personal affair, while Cho said he paid for the trip himself. Cho claimed that his out-of-pocket expenses included purchasing WBC tickets from Taiwan's Chinese Professional Baseball League (CPBL). Since tickets for Taiwan's matches had sold out early, this further triggered controversy regarding the CPBL's potential involvement in the illegal resale of tickets.
