= 2026 World Baseball Classic Pool D =

Pool D of the 2026 World Baseball Classic (branded as the World Baseball Classic 2026 Miami Capital One for sponsorship reasons) took place from March 6 to 11, 2026, at LoanDepot Park in Miami, Florida. The fourth of four pools, the top two teams automatically qualified for the top-eight knockout stage, beginning with quarterfinals in Miami and Houston, Texas.

The group consisted of Venezuela, the Dominican Republic, the Netherlands, Israel, and Nicaragua. In the final game of the pool, both Venezuela and the Dominican Republic had clinched quarterfinal berths, and competed to determine who would face defending champion Japan. The Dominicans secured the win, continuing an undefeated streak after failing to advance in 2023. Nicaragua was relegated after failing to win a game for the second consecutive tournament and must re-qualify for the next edition of the tournament.

== Teams ==
Draw position	Team	Pot	Confederation	Method of qualification	Date of qualification	Finals appearance	Last appearance	Previous best performance	WBSC Rankings
B1	Venezuela	1	WBSC Americas	2023 participants	March 8, 2023	6th	2023	Fourth place (2009)	5
B2	Dominican Republic	3	WBSC Americas	2023 participants	March 8, 2023	6th	2023	Champions (2013)	12
B3	Netherlands	2	WBSC Europe	2023 participants	March 8, 2023	6th	2023	Fourth place (2013, 2017)	9
B4	Israel	4	WBSC Europe	2023 participants	March 8, 2023	3rd	2023	Quarterfinals (2017)	21
B5	Nicaragua	5	WBSC Americas	Qualifiers Pool A winner	February 23, 2025	2nd	2023	Pool stage (2023)	16

== Standings ==
Pos	Team	Pld	W	L	RF	RA	PCT	GB	Qualification
1	Dominican Republic	4	4	0	41	10	1.000	—	Advance to knockout stage
2	Venezuela	4	3	1	26	12	.750	1	Advance to knockout stage
3	Israel	4	2	2	15	23	.500	2	
4	Netherlands	4	1	3	9	27	.250	3	
5	Nicaragua	4	0	4	6	25	.000	4	Requalification required for next WBC

Source: MLB

== Summary ==
Date	Local time	Road team	Score	Home team	Inn.	Venue	Game duration	Attendance	Boxscore
Mar 6, 2026	12:00 EST	Netherlands	2–6	Venezuela		LoanDepot Park	2:54	19,542	Boxscore
Mar 6, 2026	19:00 EST	Nicaragua	3–12	Dominican Republic		LoanDepot Park	3:20	35,127	Boxscore
Mar 7, 2026	12:00 EST	Nicaragua	3–4	Netherlands		LoanDepot Park	2:45	16,897	Boxscore
Mar 7, 2026	19:00 EST	Israel	3–11	Venezuela		LoanDepot Park	2:37	22,573	Boxscore
Mar 8, 2026	12:00 EDT	Netherlands	1–12	Dominican Republic	7	LoanDepot Park	2:23	32,324	Boxscore
Mar 8, 2026	19:00 EDT	Nicaragua	0–5	Israel		LoanDepot Park	2:45	17,972	Boxscore
Mar 9, 2026	12:00 EDT	Dominican Republic	10–1	Israel		LoanDepot Park	2:47	28,728	Boxscore
Mar 9, 2026	19:00 EDT	Venezuela	4–0	Nicaragua		LoanDepot Park	2:27	27,844	Boxscore
Mar 10, 2026	19:00 EDT	Israel	6–2	Netherlands		LoanDepot Park	2:57	13,565	Boxscore
Mar 11, 2026	20:00 EDT	Dominican Republic	7–5	Venezuela		LoanDepot Park	3:03	36,230	Boxscore

== Games ==
=== Netherlands vs. Venezuela ===
March 6, 2026 12:00 PM EST at LoanDepot Park in Miami, United States
Team	1	2	3	4	5	6	7	8	9	R	H	E
Netherlands	0	1	0	0	0	1	0	0	0	2	4	1
Venezuela	1	1	0	0	4	0	0	0	X	6	11	1
WP: Ranger Suárez (1−0) LP: Antwone Kelly (0−1); Home runs: NED: None; VEN: Javier Sanoja (1); Attendance: 19,542; Umpires: HP − Shane Livensparger, 1B − Michael Ulloa, 2B − Gabe Morales, 3B − Trent Thomas; Boxscore

=== Nicaragua vs. Dominican Republic ===
March 6, 2026 7:00 PM EST at LoanDepot Park in Miami, United States
Team	1	2	3	4	5	6	7	8	9	R	H	E
Nicaragua	1	2	0	0	0	0	0	0	0	3	9	1
Dominican Republic	2	0	1	0	0	2	1	6	X	12	14	1
WP: Seranthony Domínguez (1−0) LP: Stiven Cruz (0−1); Home runs: NCA: None; DOM: Junior Caminero (1), Oneil Cruz (1), Julio Rodríguez (1); Attendance: 35,127; Umpires: HP − Paul Clemons, 1B − Lance Barksdale, 2B − Serge Makouchetchev, 3B − Marek Vicar; Boxscore

=== Nicaragua vs. Netherlands ===
March 7, 2026 12:00 PM EST at LoanDepot Park in Miami, United States
Team	1	2	3	4	5	6	7	8	9	R	H	E
Nicaragua	0	0	0	0	1	0	0	2	0	3	9	0
Netherlands	0	0	1	0	0	0	0	0	3	4	10	1
WP: Lars Huijer (1−0) LP: Ángel Obando (0−1); Home runs: NCA: Jeter Downs (1); NED: Ozzie Albies (1); Attendance: 16,897; Umpires: HP − Trent Thomas, 1B − Quinn Wolcott, 2B − Shane Livensparger, 3B − Alejandro Pecero; Boxscore

=== Israel vs. Venezuela ===
March 7, 2026 7:00 PM EST at LoanDepot Park in Miami, United States
Team	1	2	3	4	5	6	7	8	9	R	H	E
Israel	0	0	0	0	1	1	0	0	1	3	7	2
Venezuela	4	0	0	0	1	5	0	1	x	11	14	0
WP: Enmanuel De Jesus (1−0) LP: Ben Simon (0−1); Home runs: ISR: Harrison Bader (1), RJ Schreck (1); VEN: Luis Arraez 2 (2), Eugenio Suárez (1); Attendance: 22,573; Umpires: HP − Gabe Morales, 1B − Marek Vicar, 2B − Paul Clemons, 3B − Michael Ulloa; Boxscore

=== Netherlands vs. Dominican Republic ===
March 8, 2026 12:00 PM EDT at LoanDepot Park in Miami, United States
Team	1	2	3	4	5	6	7	R	H	E
Netherlands	0	1	0	0	0	0	0	1	5	1
Dominican Republic	2	0	2	0	6	0	2	12	8	0
WP: Luis Severino (1−0) LP: Arij Fransen (0−1); Home runs: NED: Didi Gregorius (1); DOM: Vladimir Guerrero Jr. (1), Junior Caminero (2), Austin Wells (1), Juan Soto (1); Attendance: 32,324; Umpires: HP − Lance Barksdale, 1B − Serge Makouchetchev, 2B − Paul Clemons, 3B − Marek Vicar; Boxscore

=== Nicaragua vs. Israel ===
March 8, 2026 7:00 PM EDT at LoanDepot Park in Miami, United States
Team	1	2	3	4	5	6	7	8	9	R	H	E
Nicaragua	0	0	0	0	0	0	0	0	0	0	2	0
Israel	0	1	0	0	4	0	0	0	X	5	8	0
WP: Dean Kremer (1−0) LP: Carlos Rodríguez (0−1); Attendance: 17,972; Umpires: HP − Alejandro Pecero, 1B − Quinn Wolcott, 2B − Shane Livensparger, 3B − Trent Thomas; Boxscore

=== Dominican Republic vs. Israel ===
March 9, 2026 12:00 PM EDT at LoanDepot Park in Miami, United States
Team	1	2	3	4	5	6	7	8	9	R	H	E
Dominican Republic	0	5	0	1	0	0	2	1	1	10	7	0
Israel	0	0	0	1	0	0	0	0	0	1	2	0
WP: Brayan Bello (1−0) LP: Ryan Prager (0−1); Home runs: DOM: Fernando Tatís Jr. (1), Oneil Cruz (2); ISR: Spencer Horwitz (1); Attendance: 28,728; Umpires: HP − Quinn Wolcott, 1B − Gabe Morales, 2B − Michael Ulloa, 3B − Serge Makouchetchev; Boxscore

=== Venezuela vs. Nicaragua ===
March 9, 2026 7:00 PM EDT at LoanDepot Park in Miami, United States
Team	1	2	3	4	5	6	7	8	9	R	H	E
Venezuela	1	0	1	0	1	1	0	0	0	4	5	0
Nicaragua	0	0	0	0	0	0	0	0	0	0	7	3
WP: Yoendrys Gómez (1−0) LP: Danilo Bermúdez (0−1); Home runs: VEN: Ronald Acuña Jr. (1); NCA: None; Attendance: 27,844; Umpires: HP − Paul Clemons, 1B − Alejandro Pecero, 2B − Lance Barksdale, 3B − Trent Thomas; Boxscore

=== Israel vs. Netherlands ===
March 10, 2026 7:00 PM EDT at LoanDepot Park in Miami, United States
Team	1	2	3	4	5	6	7	8	9	R	H	E
Israel	0	1	0	0	0	5	0	0	0	6	8	0
Netherlands	2	0	0	0	0	0	0	0	0	2	3	1
WP: Josh Mallitz (1−0) LP: Kevin Kelly (0−1); Attendance: 13,565; Umpires: HP − Shane Livensparger, 1B − Quinn Wolcott, 2B − Marek Vicar, 3B − Michael Ulloa; Boxscore

=== Dominican Republic vs. Venezuela ===
March 11, 2026 8:00 PM EDT at LoanDepot Park in Miami, United States
Team	1	2	3	4	5	6	7	8	9	R	H	E
Dominican Republic	2	0	2	3	0	0	0	0	0	7	11	1
Venezuela	1	0	2	0	0	0	0	0	2	5	7	0
WP: Sandy Alcantara (1−0) LP: Eduardo Rodríguez (0−1) Sv: Elvis Alvarado (1); Home runs: DOM: Juan Soto (2), Ketel Marte (1), Vladimir Guerrero Jr. (2), Fernando Tatis Jr. (2); VEN: None; Attendance: 36,230; Umpires: HP − Gabe Morales, 1B − Lance Barksdale, 2B − Serge Makouchetchev, 3B − Alejandro Pecero; Boxscore

== Statistics ==
=== Batting ===
Team	AB	R	H	2B	3B	HR	BB	AVG	OBP	SLG	OBP
Dominican Republic	128	41	40	5	1	13	33	.313	.458	.672	1.130
Venezuela	133	26	37	7	0	5	19	.278	.365	.444	.809
Israel	127	15	25	4	1	3	9	.197	.261	.315	.576
Netherlands	119	9	22	2	0	2	16	.185	.303	.252	.555
Nicaragua	131	6	27	3	0	1	10	.206	.293	.252	.545

=== Pitching ===
Team	ERA	IP	H	R	ER	HR	K	BB	WHIP
Dominican Republic	2.38	34	23	10	9	2	37	12	1.029
Venezuela	2.75	36	29	12	11	6	36	9	1.056
Israel	5.91	35	26	23	23	5	27	26	1.486
Nicaragua	6.15	33.2	37	25	23	5	21	18	1.634
Netherlands	6.06	32.2	36	27	22	6	23	22	1.776
