= Jon Byrne =

Australian baseball umpire (born 1983)

- Umpire
- Born: 23 June 1983 (age 43); Perth, Western Australia, Australia

MLB debut
- 16 May 2014

Last MLB appearance
- 28 September 2014

Jon Stephen Byrne (born 23 June 1983) is an Australian former Major League Baseball (MLB) umpire. He made his debut on 16 May 2014, becoming the first MLB professional umpire to have been born in Australia. Australian second baseman Joe Quinn had acted as a substitute umpire for two National League games; one each in 1894 and 1896.

Byrne was an umpire primarily in Minor League Baseball (MiLB), working in the Midwest League (2006), Northwest League (2006), California League (2007), Eastern League (2008–2010), and International League (2011–2015). During the 2014 season, he umpired nine MLB games (three as the home plate umpire); he wore number 59 and did not issue any ejections. In 2015, Byrne worked MLB spring training games, but did not umpire any regular season games; he was released by MiLB after the season.

== See also ==
- List of Major League Baseball umpires (disambiguation)
