= Austin Wells =

American baseball player (born 1999)

- Wells with the New York Yankees in 2025

New York Yankees – No. 28
- Catcher
- Born: July 12, 1999 (age 27); Scottsdale, Arizona, U.S.
- Bats: Left Throws: Right

MLB debut
- September 1, 2023, for the New York Yankees

MLB statistics (through 2026 season)
- Batting average: .213
- Home runs: 52
- Runs batted in: 171
- Stats at Baseball Reference

Teams
- New York Yankees (2023–present)
Medals
Men's baseball
Representing Dominican Republic
World Baseball Classic
Bronze medal – third place	2026 Miami	Team

Austin Kenneth Wells (born July 12, 1999) is an American professional baseball catcher for the New York Yankees of Major League Baseball (MLB). He played college baseball for the University of Arizona, and the Yankees selected him in the first round of the 2020 MLB draft. Wells made his MLB debut in 2023. Born in the United States, he represents the Dominican Republic internationally.

== Early life ==
Wells grew up in Las Vegas, Nevada. His parents were both athletes at the University of Arizona; his father, Greg, of American descent, played baseball, and his mother, Michelle, of Dominican descent, was a gymnast. Wells' father grew up in Maxwell, California, a rural rice-farming community. He currently farms rice, and his parents (Wells' grandfather and grandmother), Kenny "KC" Wells and Kathy "Cuckoo" Wells, are retired rice farmers. Wells' brother Carson played baseball and his brother Mason played lacrosse.

== Amateur career ==
Wells attended Bishop Gorman High School, and played catcher for the baseball team. As a junior, he was named the Nevada Gatorade Player of the Year and a second team All-American by USA Today and played in the Under Armour All-America Baseball Game after finishing the season with a .500 batting average with eight home runs and 47 runs batted in (RBIs). He committed to play college baseball at the University of Arizona during his junior year.

Wells injured the elbow of his throwing arm during his senior season, requiring surgery. He could not catch during his senior year, but played as a designated hitter, limiting the interest he had drawn from Major League Baseball (MLB) teams. As a senior, he batted .527 with 20 doubles, six triples and four home runs while scoring 46 runs and batting in 46 runs. The New York Yankees selected Wells in the 35th round of the 2018 MLB draft, but he opted not to sign and enrolled at Arizona.

As a true freshman for the Arizona Wildcats, Wells batted .353 with 73 runs, 15 doubles, seven triples, five home runs, and 60 RBIs and was named the Pac-12 Conference Freshman of the Year. Following the end of the season Wells played for the Yarmouth–Dennis Red Sox of the Cape Cod Baseball League and was named a league All-Star and was awarded the Robert A. McNeese Outstanding Pro Prospect Award after hitting .308 with seven home runs and 26 RBIs.

Baseball America and the Collegiate Baseball Newspaper named Wells a second team preseason All-American and National Collegiate Baseball Writers Association named him to their third team. Wells also was named to the watchlist for the Golden Spikes Award going into his sophomore season. Wells batted .375 with two home runs, 14 RBIs and a 1.116 OPS in 15 games before the season was cut short due to the coronavirus pandemic.

== Professional career ==
The New York Yankees selected Wells in the first round, with the 28th overall selection, of the 2020 MLB draft. Wells signed with the Yankees on June 25 for a $2.5 million signing bonus.

The Yankees invited Wells to spring training in 2021 as a non-roster player. They assigned him to the Low-A Tampa Tarpons to start the 2021 minor league season and promoted him to the High-A Hudson Valley Renegades in late July. He finished the season hitting a combined .264/.390/.476 over 103 games, hitting 16 home runs with 76 RBIs. After the season, the Yankees assigned Wells to the Surprise Saguaros in the Arizona Fall League.

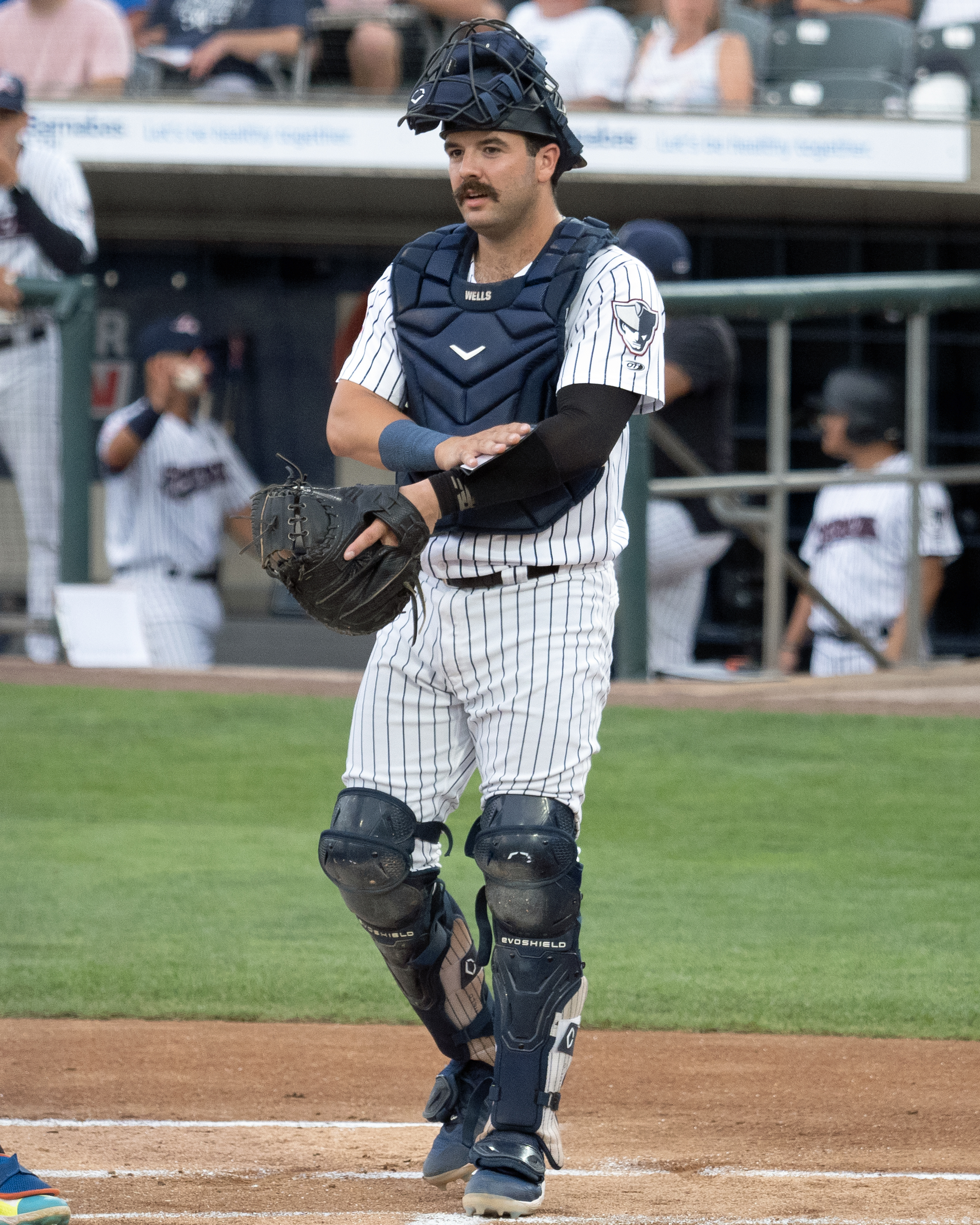
Wells with the Somerset Patriots in 2022

Wells began the 2022 season with Hudson Valley and was promoted to the Double-A Somerset Patriots in July. He broke a rib during spring training, delaying the start of his 2023 season with Somerset. On July 21, the Yankees promoted Wells to the Triple-A Scranton/Wilkes-Barre RailRiders.

On September 1, 2023, the Yankees promoted Wells to the major leagues for the first time. Wells made his debut that night, recording his first MLB hit in his first at bat against Justin Verlander. On September 20, Wells hit his first career home run, a 416-foot solo shot to right field off of pitcher Erik Swanson during a game against the Toronto Blue Jays. Wells hit back-to-back home runs against Arizona and Toronto playing a key role in his team's victories. On September 25, he hit a home run in the fourth to eliminate the Diamondbacks' lead and also gave the Yankees the lead with another run in the eighth. Next day, his two-run homer clutch hit in the ninth, the third home run in five days, allowed the Yankees to secure a 2–0 victory over the Toronto Blue Jays at Rogers Centre.

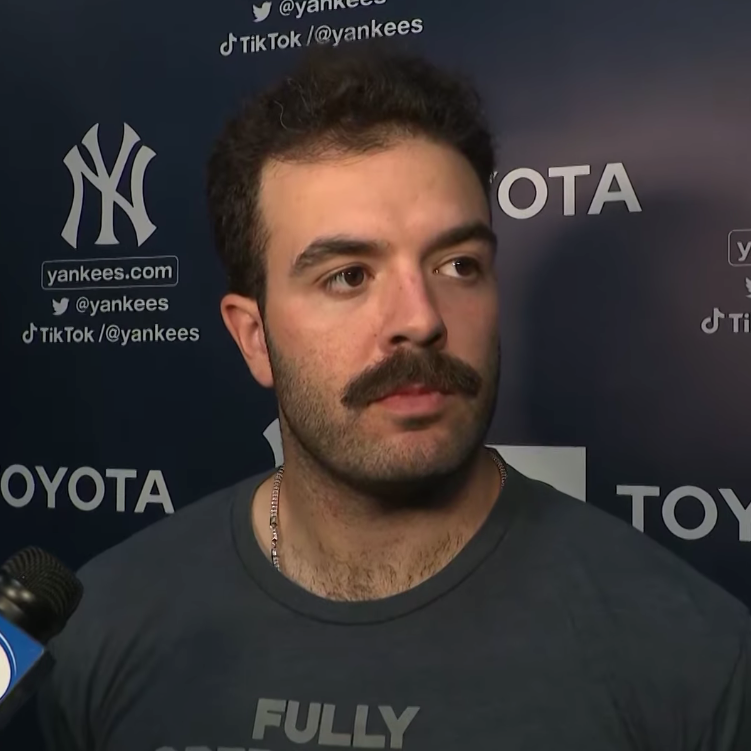
Wells with the Yankees in 2025

On March 27, 2025, Wells hit a leadoff home run, becoming the first Yankee to hit a leadoff homer on opening day and the first catcher in MLB history to do the same. On May 6, Wells hit his first career grand slam in the bottom of the seventh inning against the San Diego Padres.

In 2026, Wells struggled offensively during the first half of the season, batting .166 with four home runs and 15 RBIs through June 6. After experiencing persistent headaches, Wells was placed on the injured list on June 6. He later attributed his early-season struggles in part to repeated foul balls striking his catcher's mask. After returning, his production improved during the second half, and he finished the season batting .186 with 14 home runs and 32 RBIs in 122 games.

== International career ==
Wells represents the Dominican Republic team in international play and in 2026, he participated in the World Baseball Classic. In a quarter-final game against Team Korea, Wells hit a three-run walk-off home run in a 10–0 win, invoking the mercy rule. Throughout the tournament, Wells has hit two home runs.
