= Garrett Whitlock =

American baseball player (born 1996)

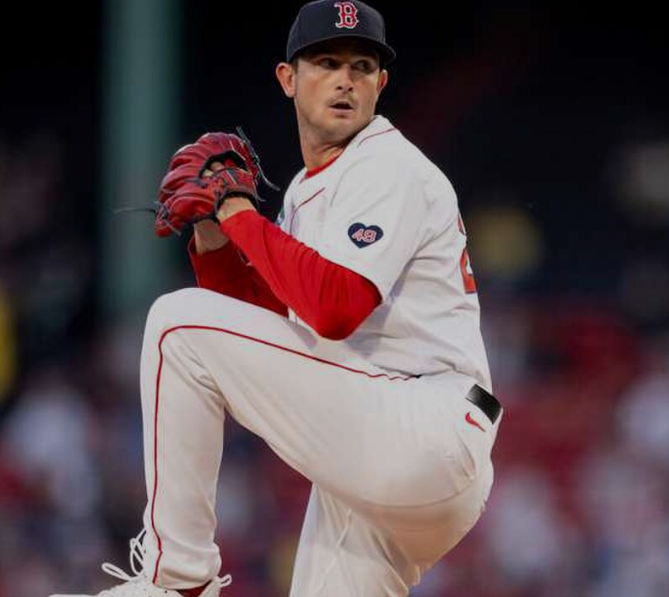
- Whitlock with the Boston Red Sox in 2024

Boston Red Sox – No. 22
- Pitcher
- Born: June 11, 1996 (age 30); Snellville, Georgia, U.S.
- Bats: Right Throws: Right

MLB debut
- April 4, 2021, for the Boston Red Sox

MLB statistics (through 2026 season)
- Win–loss record: 32–16
- Earned run average: 2.93
- Strikeouts: 402
- Stats at Baseball Reference

Teams
- Boston Red Sox (2021–present)
Medals
Men's baseball
Representing United States
World Baseball Classic
Silver medal – second place	2026 Miami	Team

Garrett Getts Whitlock (born June 11, 1996) is an American professional baseball pitcher for the Boston Red Sox of Major League Baseball (MLB). Listed at 6 feet 5 inches (1.96 m) and 190 pounds (86 kg), he throws and bats right-handed.

Whitlock played college baseball for the UAB Blazers and was selected by the New York Yankees in the 18th round of the 2017 MLB draft. The Red Sox selected him in the 2020 Rule 5 draft, and he made his MLB debut with them in 2021.

== Amateur career ==
Whitlock attended Providence Christian Academy in Lilburn, Georgia. As a junior, he posted a 1.95 earned run average (ERA) along with a .369 batting average. Not selected as a high school prospect during the 2015 Major League Baseball draft, he enrolled at the University of Alabama at Birmingham (UAB), where he played college baseball for the UAB Blazers. In 2016, he played collegiate summer baseball with the Chatham Anglers of the Cape Cod Baseball League. As a sophomore at UAB, he was 3–6 with a 4.07 ERA.

== Professional career ==
=== New York Yankees ===
After Whitlock's sophomore year of college, he was selected by the New York Yankees in the 18th round of the 2017 Major League Baseball draft, and he signed with the team. He made his professional debut in 2017 with the Gulf Coast League Yankees where he posted a 1.04 ERA in three starts. He was promoted to the Pulaski Yankees in August, and ended the season there, pitching to a 7.94 ERA in 5 2/3 innings. He began 2018 with the Charleston RiverDogs, and was promoted to the Tampa Yankees and Trenton Thunder during the season. In 23 games (21 starts) between the three clubs, Whitlock went 8–5 with a 1.86 ERA, a 1.11 WHIP, and 122 strikeouts over 120 2/3 innings. He returned to Trenton for the 2019 season, pitching to a 3–3 record with a 3.07 ERA over 14 starts, striking out 57 batters in 70 1/3 innings. His season ended in early July, as he underwent Tommy John surgery later that month. He did not play a minor league game in 2020 due to the cancellation of the season caused by the COVID-19 pandemic alongside still recovering from surgery.

=== Boston Red Sox ===
On December 10, 2020, the Boston Red Sox selected Whitlock in the Rule 5 draft. He made the Red Sox' Opening Day roster in 2021. On April 4, 2021, Whitlock made his MLB debut in relief against the Baltimore Orioles, striking out five batters and allowing no runs in 3 1/3 innings pitched. He earned his first major league win on June 5 after pitching a scoreless 1 2/3 innings in relief against the Yankees in New York. On June 15, Whitlock batted in an interleague game and recorded his first career hit, a single off of Atlanta Braves reliever Edgar Santana. Whitlock was placed on the injured list on September 21 with a right pectoral strain, and activated on October 3. For the 2021 regular season, Whitlock pitched 73 1/3 innings in 46 relief appearances, during which he went 8–4 with a 1.96 ERA and 81 strikeouts. In the postseason, he made five relief appearances, earning one win and allowing two runs in 8 1/3 innings as the Red Sox advanced to the American League Championship Series.

On April 10, 2022, Whitlock signed a four-year, $18.75 million extension with the Red Sox. He opened the season as a member of Boston's bullpen, then was added to the rotation in the second-half of April. Whitlock was placed on the injured list on June 10 with right hip inflammation, and reactivated by the team on July 15. He returned to the injured list on September 21 with a right hip impingement. In 31 appearances (nine starts), Whitlock posted a 4–2 record with six saves and 3.45 ERA while striking out 82 batters in 78 1/3 innings.

Whitlock began the 2023 season on a rehab assignment with the Worcester Red Sox, and was activated by Boston on April 11. He was placed on the injured list on April 28, due to right elbow ulnar neuritis, and rejoined the Red Sox on May 27. He was again placed on the injured list on July 4, with right elbow inflammation, and returned to the team on August 13. Whitlock was placed on the bereavement list on September 3, and activated on September 10. In 22 total games (10 starts) in 2023, he compiled a 5–5 record and 5.15 ERA with 72 strikeouts across 71 2/3 innings.

In 2024, Whitlock made four starts for Boston, recording a 1.96 ERA with 17 strikeouts across 18 1/3 innings pitched. On May 30, 2024, he underwent an internal brace procedure to repair a torn ulnar collateral ligament, which ended his season.

Whitlock returned to Boston's bullpen for the 2025 season. He made 62 relief appearances and went 7–3 with a 2.25 ERA in 72 innings pitched.

For the 2026 season, he remained in the bullpen. On May 28, he was placed on the injured list after a left leg strain. On June 9, he was activated from the injured list. Whitlock was placed on the injured list for a second time on August 13 with right elbow inflammation, and returned to the Red Sox on August 29. He made 54 relief appearances for Boston and had a 7–2 record, a 1.72 ERA, and 59 strikeouts across 52 1/3 innings. After the season, the Red Sox exercised his $8.25 million club option for him to return to the team in 2027.

== International career ==
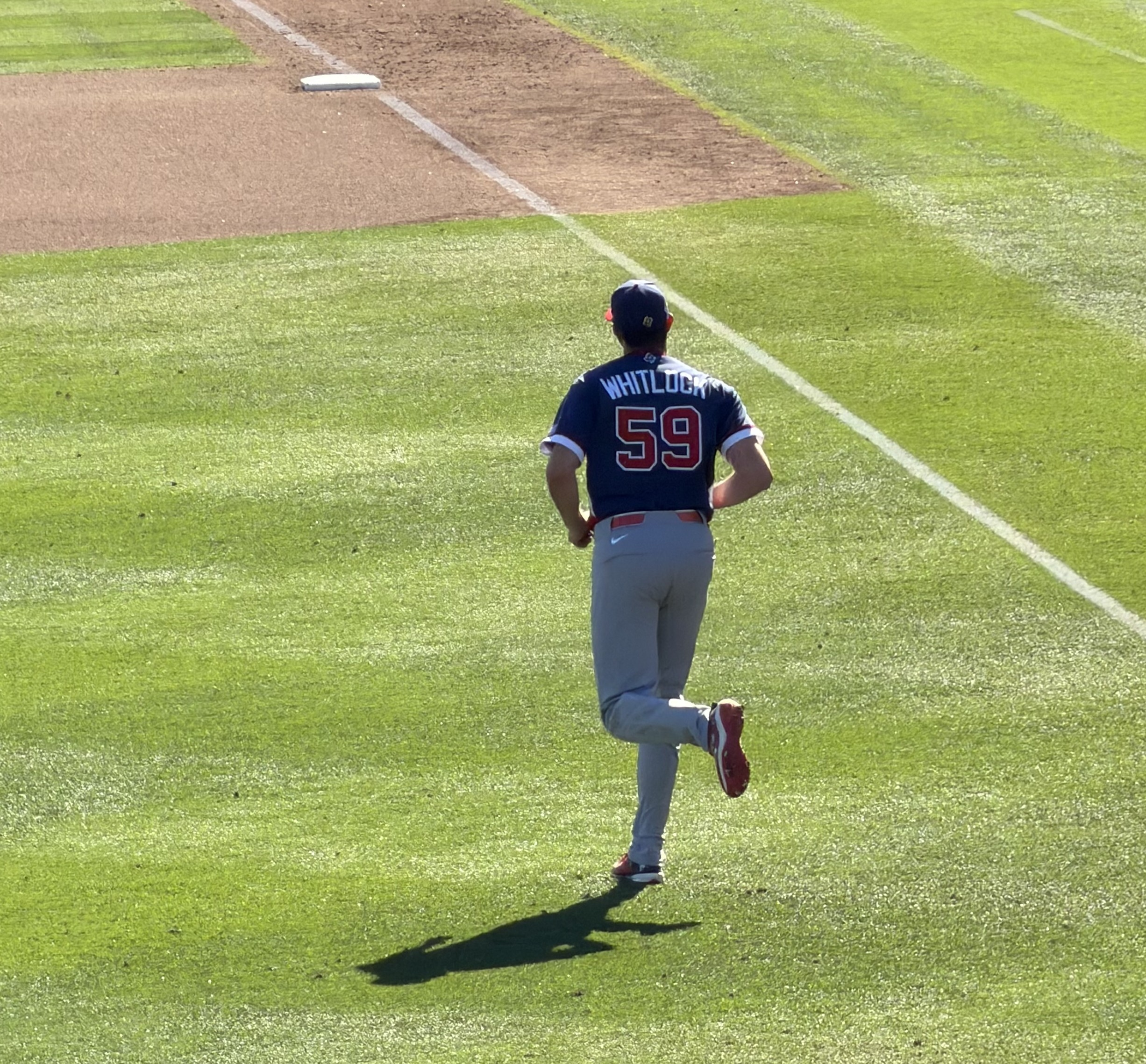
Garrett Whitlock playing for Team USA March 2026

Before the 2026 season, Whitlock pitched for team USA in the World Baseball Classic, posting a 2.70 ERA, alongside a 0.90 WHIP, one save and five strikeouts across 3 1/3 innings pitched.

== Personal life ==
Whitlock learned American Sign Language from his mother at a young age. Whitlock and his wife, Jordan, married in November 2019. Whitlock is a Christian.

== See also ==
- Rule 5 draft results
