= Enmanuel De Jesus =

Venezuelan baseball player (born 1996)

Detroit Tigers – No. 37
- Pitcher
- Born: December 10, 1996 (age 29); Valencia, Venezuela
- Bats: Left Throws: Left

Professional debut
- MLB: September 9, 2023, for the Miami Marlins
- KBO: March 26, 2024, for the Kiwoom Heroes

MLB statistics (through 2026 season)
- Win–loss record: 2–0
- Earned run average: 4.81
- Strikeouts: 44

KBO statistics (through 2025 season)
- Win–loss record: 22–20
- Earned run average: 3.81
- Strikeouts: 343
- Stats at Baseball Reference

Teams
- Miami Marlins (2023); Kiwoom Heroes (2024); KT Wiz (2025); Detroit Tigers (2026–present)
Medals
Men's baseball
Representing Venezuela
World Baseball Classic
Gold medal – first place	2026 Miami	Team

Enmanuel José De Jesus (born December 10, 1996) is a Venezuelan professional baseball pitcher for the Detroit Tigers of Major League Baseball (MLB). He has previously played in MLB for the Miami Marlins, and in the KBO League for the Kiwoom Heroes and KT Wiz.

== Career ==
=== Boston Red Sox ===
On August 9, 2013, when he was 16 years old, De Jesus signed a professional contract with the Boston Red Sox as an international free agent. He made his professional debut with the Dominican Summer League Red Sox, logging a 3.15 ERA across 14 starts. De Jesus split the 2015 season between the rookie–level Gulf Coast League Red Sox and Low–A Lowell Spinners, accumulating a 6–2 record and 1.74 ERA with 31 strikeouts across 46 2/3 innings pitched.

In 2016, De Jesus played for Lowell and the Single–A Greenville Drive. In 14 starts between the two affiliates, he pitched to a 4.79 ERA with 46 strikeouts across 67 2/3 innings of work. De Jesus returned to the clubs the following season, posting a 3.90 ERA with 55 strikeouts in another 14 starts. In 2018, while pitching for Single–A Greenville, De Jesus started a no-hitter that was completed by Devon Fisher and Durbin Feltman. On the year, he made 25 appearances split between Greenville and the High–A Salem Red Sox, working to a 4.50 ERA with 125 strikeouts across 122 innings.

De Jesus spent the 2019 season with Salem, posting a 9–9 record and 3.58 ERA with 122 strikeouts in 24 starts. He did not play in a game in 2020 due to the cancellation of the minor league season because of the COVID-19 pandemic. De Jesus elected free agency on November 2, 2020, and re–signed with Boston on a minor league contract on November 17.

He returned to action in 2021, splitting the season between the Double–A Portland Sea Dogs and Triple–A Worcester Red Sox. In 22 games (9 starts), De Jesus recorded a 3.94 ERA with 74 strikeouts across 64 innings. He elected free agency following the season on November 7, 2021.

=== San Francisco Giants ===
On December 15, 2021, De Jesus signed a minor league contract with the San Francisco Giants. He spent the 2022 season with the Triple–A Sacramento River Cats, making 35 appearances (19 starts) and posting a 4.51 ERA with 118 strikeouts across 101 2/3 innings. De Jesus elected free agency following the season on November 10, 2022.

=== Miami Marlins ===
On December 10, 2022, De Jesus signed a minor league contract with the Miami Marlins organization. In 19 games (18 starts) split between the Triple–A Jacksonville Jumbo Shrimp and Single–A Jupiter Hammerheads, he recorded a 4.70 ERA with 70 strikeouts across 92 innings.

On September 8, 2023, the Marlins promoted De Jesus to the major leagues. In two games for Miami, he allowed eight runs on nine hits and four walks with five strikeouts across 6 1/3 innings of work. Following the season on October 31, De Jesus was removed from the 40–man roster and sent outright to the Triple–A Jacksonville Jumbo Shrimp. He elected free agency on November 6.

=== Kiwoom Heroes ===
On December 17, 2023, De Jesus signed a one–year, $800,000 contract with Kiwoom Heroes of KBO League. In 30 starts for the team in 2024, he posted a 13–11 record with a 3.68 ERA and 178 strikeouts across 171 1/3 innings of work. De Jesus became a free agent following the season.

=== KT Wiz ===
On November 30, 2024, De Jesus signed with the KT Wiz of the KBO League on a $1 million contract. De Jesus made 32 appearances (30 starts) for the team during the 2025 season, compiling a 9-9 record and 3.96 ERA with 165 strikeouts across 163 2/3 innings pitched.

=== Detroit Tigers ===
On December 18, 2025, De Jesus signed a minor league contract with the Detroit Tigers. On March 10, 2026, the Tigers selected De Jesus' contract, adding him to their 40-man roster. He made the team out of spring training and got his first MLB win in his Tigers debut. On June 2, 2026, De Jesus recorded his first major league save by pitching the final four innings of the Tigers' 8–0 win over the Tampa Bay Rays. He needed only 35 pitches to get through the four innings, retiring all 12 batters he faced, four on strikeouts. On June 27, the Tigers optioned De Jesus to Toledo upon the return of Jack Flaherty.

== International career ==
De Jesus played for the Venezuelan national baseball team in the 2023 World Baseball Classic. He also played for Venezuela during the 2026 World Baseball Classic, where the team won its first title. He was inducted into the Venezuelan Baseball Hall of Fame as a member of the 2026 WBC championship team.
