= Daniel Palencia =

Venezuelan baseball player (born 2000)

Chicago Cubs – No. 48
- Pitcher
- Born: February 5, 2000 (age 26); San Carlos, Venezuela
- Bats: Right Throws: Right

MLB debut
- July 4, 2023, for the Chicago Cubs

MLB statistics (through 2026 season)
- Win–loss record: 8–12
- Earned run average: 3.81
- Strikeouts: 140
- Stats at Baseball Reference

Teams
- Chicago Cubs (2023–present)
Medals
Men's baseball
Representing Venezuela
World Baseball Classic
Gold medal – first place	2026 Miami	Team

Daniel Jesús Palencia (born February 5, 2000) is a Venezuelan professional baseball pitcher for the Chicago Cubs of Major League Baseball (MLB). He made his MLB debut in 2023.

== Career ==
=== Oakland Athletics ===
Palencia signed with the Oakland Athletics as an international free agent on February 13, 2020. Palencia did not play in a game in 2020 due to the cancellation of the minor league season because of the COVID-19 pandemic. He made his professional debut in 2021 with the Single–A Stockton Ports. In six starts for Stockton, he struggled to an 0–2 record and 6.91 ERA with 14 strikeouts in 14 1/3 innings pitched.

=== Chicago Cubs ===
On July 26, 2021, Palencia, along with Greg Deichmann, was traded to the Chicago Cubs for Andrew Chafin. He started his Cubs career pitching for the Single–A Myrtle Beach Pelicans. In 2022, Palencia played for the High–A South Bend Cubs, making 21 appearances (20 starts) and logging a 3.94 ERA with 98 strikeouts across 75 1/3 innings pitched.

Palencia began the 2023 season with the Double–A Tennessee Smokies. In 18 games split between Tennessee and the Triple–A Iowa Cubs, he registered a 6.83 ERA with 36 strikeouts and 2 saves in 29 innings pitched. On July 4, 2023, Palencia was promoted to the major leagues for the first time, winning his debut in extra innings. In 27 relief outings in his rookie campaign, he logged a 5–3 record and 4.45 ERA with 33 strikeouts across 28 1/3 innings pitched.

Palencia was optioned to Triple–A Iowa to begin the 2024 season. He made 10 appearances for Chicago, struggling to an 0-1 record and 6.14 ERA with 16 strikeouts across 14 2/3 innings pitched. Palencia was again optioned to Triple-A Iowa to begin the 2025 season.

Palencia made 19 relief appearances for Chicago to begin the 2026 season, compiling a 2–1 record and 2.70 ERA with 19 strikeouts and three saves. On June 16, 2026, Palencia was placed on the injured list due to right elbow inflammation. He was transferred to the 60–day injured list on August 17, before being activated four days later.

== International career ==
Palencia was the closer for the Venezuela during the team's 3-2 win over the United States, earning the 2026 World Baseball Classic championship title. He was inducted into the Venezuelan Baseball Hall of Fame as a member of the 2026 WBC championship team.
