= Jeremie Rehak =

American baseball umpire (born 1987)

MLB – No. 35
- Umpire
- Born: November 13, 1987 (age 38); Murrysville, Pennsylvania, U.S.

MLB debut
- April 9, 2018

Crew information
- Umpiring crew: M
- Crew members: #58 Dan Iassogna (crew chief); #54 C. B. Bucknor; #35 Jeremie Rehak; #38 Adam Beck

Career highlights and awards
- Special Assignments: Wild Card Game/Series (2023, 2024); Division Series (2022, 2025, 2026); Championship Series (2024); All-Star Games (2025); MLB Little League Classic (2018)

Jeremie Rehak (born November 13, 1987) is an American umpire in Major League Baseball. Rehak wears uniform number 35.

Rehak graduated from Franklin Regional High School in Murrysville, Pennsylvania, then played three seasons for the Ohio Bobcats baseball team as a walk-on. During his freshman season in 2007, Rehak was an infielder. In later seasons, he was moved to the outfield. While attending Ohio University, Rehak umpired youth baseball. In January 2011, he enrolled at the Wendelstedt Umpire School. Subsequently, Rehak began his professional umpiring career in the minor leagues. He had spent three seasons at the Triple-A level until his major league debut in April 2018. In December 2020, the Wendelstedt Umpire School announced that Rehak had been hired to a full-time position at the major league level.

== See also ==
- List of Major League Baseball umpires (disambiguation)
