= Delfin Colon =

Puerto Rican baseball umpire (born 1969)

- Born: August 22, 1969 (age 56); Santurce, Puerto Rico
- Occupation: MLB umpire
- Height: 6 ft 5 in (1.96 m)

Delfin F. Colon (born August 22, 1969) is a Puerto Rican former Major League Baseball (MLB) umpire.

Colon served as an alternate umpire for the 2006 World Baseball Classic. He umpired his first MLB game on July 28, 2008, and his last on September 27, 2009. He officiated in a total of 46 games in his MLB career. In 2010, Colon became the first former MLB umpire to work in the Atlantic League.

== See also ==
- List of Major League Baseball umpires (disambiguation)
