= List of Major League Baseball umpiring leaders =

The following include various records set by major league baseball umpires. Leagues are abbreviated as follows:

- AA – American Association, 1882–1891
- AL – American League, 1901–1999
- FL – Federal League, 1914–1915
- ML – Major League Baseball, 2000–present (AL and NL umpiring staffs were merged in 2000)
- NL – National League, 1876–1999
- PL – Players' League, 1890

== Regular season ==
In the regular season charts, umpires who are active entering the 2025 season are indicated in boldface; members of the Baseball Hall of Fame are indicated in italics.

=== Total games ===
The following umpires have officiated in at least 3,000 major league games through the 2024 season. Although the totals reflect all games umpired, the years indicate only those seasons in which each individual was employed as a league umpire, omitting seasons in which they may have acted as an emergency substitute during their playing career.

1. Joe West – 5,460 (NL, 1976–1999; ML, 2002–2021)
2. Bill Klem – 5,373 (NL, 1905–1941)
3. Bruce Froemming – 5,163 (NL, 1971–1999; ML, 2000–2007)
4. Gerry Davis – 4,849 (NL, 1982–1999; ML, 2000–2021)
5. Tommy Connolly – 4,769 (NL, 1898–1900; AL, 1901–1932)
6. Doug Harvey – 4,674 (NL, 1962–1992)
7. Joe Brinkman – 4,505 (AL, 1972–1999; ML, 2000–2006)
8. Harry Wendelstedt – 4,500 (NL, 1966–1998)
9. Derryl Cousins – 4,496 (AL, 1979–1999; ML, 2000–2012)
10. Bill McGowan – 4,424 (AL, 1925–1954)
11. Mike Reilly – 4,491 (AL, 1977–1999; ML, 2000–2010)
12. Jerry Crawford – 4,371 (NL, 1976–1999; ML, 2000–2010)
13. Ed Montague – 4,369 (NL, 1974, 1976–1999; ML, 2000–2009)
14. Larry Barnett – 4,290 (AL, 1969–1999)
15. Dana DeMuth – 4,283 (NL, 1983–1999; ML, 2000–2019)
16. Tim McClelland – 4,236 (AL, 1981–1999; ML, 2000–2013)
17. Al Barlick – 4,231 (NL, 1940–1943, 1946–1955, 1958–1971)
18. Bob Emslie – 4,228 (AA, 1890; NL, 1891–1924)
19. Bill Dinneen – 4,218 (AL, 1909–1937)
20. Tim Welke – 4,216 (AL, 1983–1999; ML, 2000–2015)
21. Cy Rigler – 4,144 (NL, 1906–1922, 1924–1935)
22. Bill Summers – 4,121 (AL, 1933–1959)
23. Larry McCoy – 4,024 (AL, 1970–1999)
24. Hank O'Day – 3,986 (NL, 1895–1911, 1913, 1915–1927)
25. Dave Phillips – 3,934 (AL, 1971–1999; ML, 2001–2002)
26. Bob Davidson – 3,908 (NL, 1982–1999; ML, 2005–2016)
27. Jim Evans – 3,897 (AL, 1971–1999)
28. Dale Scott – 3,897 (AL, 1985–1999; ML, 2000–2017)
29. Nestor Chylak – 3,857 (AL, 1954–1978)
30. Angel Hernandez – 3,839 (NL, 1991–1999, ML, 2000–2024)
31. Lee Weyer – 3,827 (NL, 1961–1988)
32. Don Denkinger – 3,824 (AL, 1969–1998)
33. Jim Honochick – 3,815 (AL, 1949–1973)
34. Mike Winters – 3,810 (NL, 1988–1999, ML 2000–2019)
35. Tom Gorman – 3,803 (NL, 1951–1977)
36. Augie Donatelli – 3,775 (NL, 1950–1973)
37. Frank Pulli – 3,774 (NL, 1972–1999)
38. Terry Tata – 3,743 (NL, 1973–1999)
39. Randy Marsh – 3,707 (NL, 1981–1999; ML, 2000–2009)
40. Tom Hallion – 3,645 (NL, 1985–1999; ML 2005–2022)
41. Jerry Layne – 3,639 (NL, 1989–1999; ML, 2000–2024)
42. Bob Engel – 3,630 (NL, 1965–1990)
43. John Kibler – 3,630 (NL, 1963–1989)
44. Jocko Conlan – 3,618 (NL, 1941–1965)
45. Larry Napp – 3,608 (AL, 1951–1974)
46. Hank Soar – 3,595 (AL, 1950–1975, 1977–1978)
47. John Hirschbeck – 3,589 (AL, 1983–1999; ML, 2000–2007, 2009–2011, 2013–2016)
48. Gary Cederstrom – 3,579 (AL, 1989–1999; ML, 2000–2019)
49. Ed Vargo – 3,555 (NL, 1960–1983)
50. Beans Reardon – 3,522 (NL, 1926–1949)
51. Jim McKean – 3,514 (AL, 1974–1999; ML, 2000–2001)
52. Larry Vanover – 3,470 (NL, 1991, 1993–1999; ML, 2002–2024)
53. **Brian O'Nora** – 3,459 (AL, 1992–1999; ML, 2000–2019, 2021–present)
54. Billy Williams – 3,432 (NL, 1963–1987)
55. Brian Gorman – 3,430 (NL, 1991–1999; ML 2000–2021)
56. Ted Barrett - 3,400 (AL, 1994–1999; ML 2000–2022)
57. Rich Garcia – 3,398 (AL, 1975–1999)
58. Babe Pinelli – 3,398 (NL, 1935–1956)
59. John McSherry – 3,396 (NL, 1971–1995)
60. Rick Reed – 3,391 (AL, 1979–1999; ML, 2000–2009)
61. Al Clark – 3,390 (AL, 1976–1999; ML, 2000–2001)
62. Eddie Rommel – 3,364 (AL, 1938–1959)
63. Tim Tschida – 3,358 (AL, 1985–1999; ML, 2000–2012)
64. Ernie Quigley – 3,350 (NL, 1913–1938)
65. Johnny Stevens – 3,345 (AL, 1948–1971, 1973, 1975)
66. George Hildebrand – 3,331 (AL, 1913–1934)
67. Brick Owens – 3,325 (NL, 1908, 1912–1913; AL, 1916–1937)
68. Billy Evans – 3,323 (AL, 1906–1927)
69. Jerry Meals – 3,303 (NL, 1992–1999; ML, 2000–2022)
70. **Bill Miller** – 3,300 (AL, 1997–1999; ML, 2000–present)
71. Jeff Kellogg – 3,276 (NL, 1991–1999; ML, 2000–2019)
72. **C. B. Bucknor** – 3,271 (NL, 1996–1999; ML, 2000–present)
73. Gary Darling – 3,270 (NL, 1986–1999; ML, 2002–2013)
74. Jim Joyce – 3,268 (AL, 1987–1999; ML 2000–2016)
75. Greg Kosc – 3,256 (AL, 1976–1999)
76. Ed Sudol – 3,247 (NL, 1957–1977)
77. Larry Goetz – 3,223 (NL, 1936–1956)
78. **Laz Díaz** – 3,218 (AL, 1995, 1997–1999; ML, 2000–present)
79. Lee Ballanfant – 3,214 (NL, 1936–1957)
80. Red Flaherty – 3,207 (AL, 1953–1973)
81. Bill Stewart – 3,199 (NL, 1933–1954)
82. Paul Runge – 3,196 (NL, 1973–1997)
83. **Doug Eddings** – 3,191 (AL, 1998–1999; ML, 2000–present)
84. Charley Moran – 3,184 (NL, 1918–1939)
85. **Marvin Hudson** – 3,166 (NL, 1998–1999; ML, 2000–present)
86. Frank Umont – 3,147 (AL, 1954–1973)
87. Joe Paparella – 3,143 (AL, 1946–1965)
88. Jeff Nelson – 3,142 (NL, 1997–1999; ML, 2000–2023)
89. Fieldin Culbreth – 3,140 (AL, 1993–1999; ML, 2000–2019, 2021)
90. Dale Ford – 3,137 (AL, 1975–1999)
91. Shag Crawford – 3,121 (NL, 1956–1975)
92. **Phil Cuzzi** – 3,121 (NL, 1991–1993, 1999; ML, 2000–2019, 2021–2025)
93. )
94. Durwood Merrill – 3,121 (AL, 1976–1999)
95. **Dan Iassogna** – 3,108 (AL, 1999; ML, 2000–present)
96. **Chris Guccione** – 3,099 (ML, 2000–present)
97. Paul Pryor – 3,094 (NL, 1961–1981)
98. Charlie Berry – 3,080 (AL, 1942–1962)
99. Bill Haller – 3,068 (AL, 1961, 1963–1982)
100. **Hunter Wendelstedt** – 3,065 (NL, 1998–1999; ML, 2000–present)
101. John Shulock – 3,050 (AL, 1979–1999; ML, 2000–2002)
102. George Moriarty – 3,047 (AL, 1917–1926, 1929–1940)
103. Jerry Neudecker – 3,025 (AL, 1966–1985)
104. Marty Springstead – 3,010 (AL, 1966–1985)
105. **Mark Wegner** – 3,009 (NL, 1998–1999; ML, 2000–present)

=== Home plate ===
The following umpires have acted as home plate umpire, or umpire-in-chief, for at least 1,000 major league games through the 2024 season.

1. Bill Klem – 3,546 (NL, 1905–1941)
2. Hank O'Day – 2,710 (NL, 1895–1911, 1913, 1915–1927)
3. Cy Rigler – 2,473 (NL, 1906–1922, 1924–1935)
4. Bob Emslie – 2,357 (AA, 1890; NL, 1891–1924)
5. Tommy Connolly – 2,318 (NL, 1898–1900; AL, 1901–1932)
6. Bill Dinneen – 1,930 (AL, 1909–1937)
7. Silk O'Loughlin – 1,816 (AL, 1902–1918)
8. Billy Evans – 1,757 (AL, 1906–1927)
9. Bill McGowan – 1,646 (AL, 1925–1954)
10. Ernie Quigley – 1,514 (NL, 1913–1938)
11. Brick Owens – 1,446 (NL, 1908, 1912–1913; AL, 1916–1937)
12. Jack Sheridan – 1,439 (PL, 1890; NL, 1892–1893, 1896–1897; AL, 1901–1914)
13. Joe West – 1,391 (NL, 1976–1999; ML, 2002–2021)
14. Bill Summers – 1,367 (AL, 1933–1959)
15. Tom Lynch – 1,309 (NL, 1888–1899, 1902)
16. Charley Moran – 1,306 (NL, 1918–1939)
17. George Hildebrand – 1,305 (AL, 1913–1934)
18. Bruce Froemming – 1,303 (NL, 1971–1999; ML, 2000–2007)
19. Tim Hurst – 1,285 (NL, 1891–1898, 1900, 1903–1904; AL, 1905–1909)
20. Beans Reardon – 1,260 (NL, 1926–1949)
21. Jim Johnstone – 1,245 (AL, 1902; NL, 1903–1912; FL, 1915)
22. George Moriarty – 1,242 (AL, 1917–1926, 1929–1940)
23. Gerry Davis – 1,211 (NL, 1982–1999; ML, 2000–2019, 2021)
24. Al Barlick – 1,201 (NL, 1940–1943, 1946–1955, 1958–1971)
25. Doug Harvey – 1,189 (NL, 1962–1992)
26. Dick Nallin – 1,159 (AL, 1915–1932)
27. Derryl Cousins – 1,137 (AL, 1979–1999; ML, 2000–2012)
28. Joe Brinkman – 1,135 (AL, 1972–1999; ML, 2000–2006)
29. Mike Reilly – 1,127 (AL, 1977–1999; ML, 2000–2010)
30. Harry Wendelstedt – 1,125 (NL, 1966–1998)
31. Ed Montague – 1,099 (NL, 1974, 1976–1999; ML, 2000–2009)
32. Larry Barnett – 1,090 (AL, 1969–1999)
33. Babe Pinelli – 1,087 (NL, 1935–1956)
34. Jerry Crawford – 1,086 (NL, 1976–1999; ML, 2000–2010)
35. Dana DeMuth – 1,082 (NL, 1983–1999; ML, 2000–2017, 2019)
36. Jocko Conlan – 1,075 (NL, 1941–1965)
37. Tim McClelland – 1,076 (AL, 1981–1999; ML, 2000–2013)
38. Tim Welke – 1,070 (AL, 1983–1999; ML, 2000–2015)
39. Bill Stewart – 1,050 (NL, 1933–1954)
40. John Gaffney – 1,038 (NL, 1884–1887, 1891–1894, 1898–1900; AA, 1888–1889; PL, 1890)
41. Eddie Rommel – 1,029 (AL, 1938–1959)
42. Larry McCoy – 1,016 (AL, 1970–1999)
43. Bob Davidson – 1,008 (NL, 1982–1999; ML, 2005–2016)
44. Larry Goetz – 1,006 (NL, 1936–1956)

=== Ejections ===
The following umpires have ejected at least 75 individuals (players/managers/coaches) in their careers up through the 2024 season.

1. Bill Klem – 358 (NL, 1905–1941)
2. Cy Rigler – 286 (NL, 1906–1935)
3. Hank O'Day – 237 (NL, 1895–1911, 1913, 1915–1927)
4. Tommy Connolly – 203 (NL, 1898–1900; AL, 1901–1932)
5. Joe West – 196 (NL, 1976–1999; ML, 2002–2021)
6. Lord Byron – 196 (NL, 1913–1919)
7. Jim Johnstone – 195 (AL, 1902; NL, 1903–1912; FL, 1915)
8. Ernie Quigley – 192 (NL, 1913–1938)
9. Silk O'Loughlin – 190 (AL, 1902–1918)
10. Bob Davidson – 173 (NL, 1982–1999; ML, 2005–2016)
11. Bob Emslie – 152 (NL, 1891–1924)
12. Jocko Conlan – 135 (NL, 1941–1965)
13. Bruce Froemming – 125 (NL, 1971–1999; ML, 2000–2007)
14. Augie Donatelli – 124 (NL, 1950–1973)
15. Derryl Cousins – 122 (AL, 1979–1999; ML, 2000–2012)
16. Billy Evans – 121 (AL, 1906–1927)
17. Frank Dascoli – 119 (NL, 1948–1961)
18. Bill Stewart – 117 (NL, 1933–1954)
19. Jack Sheridan – 114 (PL, 1890; NL 1892–1914)
20. George Barr – 112 (NL, 1931–1949)
21. Gary Darling – 112 (NL, 1986–1999; ML, 2002–2013)
22. Eddie Hurley – 110 (AL, 1947–1965)
23. Marty Foster – 110 (AL, 1996–1999; ML, 2000–2022)
24. Rich Garcia – 109 (AL, 1975–1999)
25. Mal Eason – 108 (NL, 1910–1917)
26. Brick Owens – 108 (NL, 1908, 1912–1913; AL, 1916–1937)
27. Harry Wendelstedt – 108 (NL, 1966–1998)
28. Mike Winters – 107 (NL, 1990–1999; ML, 2000–2019)
29. Joe Brinkman – 105 (AL, 1973–1999; ML, 2000–2006)
30. **Doug Eddings** – 105 (AL, 1998–1999; ML, 2000–present)
31. **Hunter Wendelstedt** – 104 (NL, 1998–1999; ML, 2000–present)
32. Frank Secory – 104 (NL, 1952–1970)
33. Durwood Merrill – 103 (AL, 1977–1999)
34. Jerry Layne – 103 (NL, 1989–1999; ML, 2000–2024)
35. Charley Moran – 102 (NL, 1918–1939)
36. Lou Jorda – 102 (NL, 1927–1931, 1940–1952)
37. Larry Goetz – 102 (NL, 1936–1956)
38. Tom Hallion – 102 (NL, 1985–1999; ML, 2005–2022)
39. Bill Welke – 102 (AL, 1999; ML, 2000–2022)
40. George Magerkurth – 101 (NL, 1929–1947)
41. Larry Barnett – 101 (AL, 1969–1999)
42. Bill McGowan – 99 (AL, 1925–1954)
43. **Phil Cuzzi** – 99 (NL, 1991–1993, 1999; ML, 2000–2019, 2021–present)
44. Cy Pfirman – 98 (NL, 1922–1936)
45. John Hirschbeck – 98 (AL, 1983–1999; ML, 2000–2016)
46. Angel Hernandez – 98 (NL, 1991–1999; ML, 2000–2024)
47. Shag Crawford – 97 (NL 1954–1975)
48. Al Barlick – 96 (NL, 1940–1943, 1946–1955, 1958–1971)
49. Greg Kosc – 96 (AL, 1976–1999)
50. Jerry Crawford – 96 (NL, 1976–1999; ML, 2000–2010)
51. Dale Scott – 92 (AL, 1986–1999; ML, 2000–2017)
52. Greg Gibson – 92 (NL, 1997–1999; ML, 2000–2019, 2021–2022)
53. Dick Nallin – 91 (AL, 1915–1932)
54. Dale Ford – 90 (AL, 1975–1999)
55. Gerry Davis – 90 (NL, 1982–1999; ML, 2000–2019, 2021)
56. Tim Timmons – 90 (NL, 1999; ML, 2000–2021)
57. Bill Hohn – 89 (NL, 1989–1999; ML, 2000–2011)
58. **Dan Iassogna** – 89 (AL, 1999; NL, 1999; ML, 2000–present)
59. Dave Phillips – 88 (AL, 1971–1999; ML, 2000–2002)
60. George Hildebrand – 86 (AL, 1913–1934)
61. Tim Tschida – 86 (AL, 1985–1999; ML, 2000–2012)
62. Larry Napp – 85 (AL, 19,51–1974)
63. Larry Vanover – 84 (NL, 1991, 1993–1999; ML, 2002–2024)
64. Bill Dinneen – 83 (AL, 1907, 1909–1937)
65. Stan Landes – 83 (NL, 1955–1972)
66. John Kibler – 83 (NL, 1963–1989)
67. Eric Gregg – 81 (NL, 1976–1991, 1993–1999)
68. Ken Kaiser – 81 (AL, 1977–1999)
69. Tim McClelland – 81 (AL, 1981–1999; ML, 2000–2013)
70. Mike Everitt – 81 (AL, 1996–1999; ML, 2000–2019)
71. Bill Summers – 80 (AL, 1933–1959)
72. Artie Gore – 79 (NL, 1947–1956)
73. Terry Tata – 79 (NL, 1973–1999)
74. John Shulock – 79 (AL, 1979–1999; ML, 2000–2002)
75. Lee Ballanfant – 78 (NL, 1936–1957)
76. Jim Quick – 78 (NL, 1974, 1976–1998)
77. Sam Holbrook – 78 (AL, 1996; NL, 1997–1999; ML, 2002–2013, 2015–2019, 2021)
78. **Mark Wegner** – 78 (NL, 1998–1999; ML, 2000–present)
79. Ed Vargo – 77 (NL, 1960–1983)
80. Jeff Nelson – 77 (NL, 1997–1999; ML, 2000–2023)
81. Al Clark – 76 (AL, 1976–1999; ML, 2000–2001)
82. **Alfonso Marquez** – 76 (NL, 1999; ML, 2000–present)
83. Ziggy Sears – 75 (NL, 1934–1945)
84. Drew Coble – 75 (AL, 1982–1999)
85. **Rob Drake** – 75 (NL, 1999; ML, 2000–present)

== Postseason ==
The current Major League Baseball postseason consists of the Wild Card Series, the Division Series, the League Championship Series, and the World Series. In the postseason charts, crew chiefs are denoted by a † following the year. The position of crew chief was not as clearly established in the early years of the 20th century; for the purpose of this list, the crew chief for early World Series is defined as the home plate umpire for Game 1. Umpires who are active entering the 2025 season are indicated in bold face; members of the Baseball Hall of Fame are indicated in italics.

=== World Series ===
The World Series is the culminating best-of-seven championship series of major league baseball, and has been played since 1903, with the exception of 1904 and 1994. It is played between the National League and American League champions. Throughout World Series history, the position of crew chief usually alternated between umpires of the American League and National League until the two leagues umpire staffs merged in 2000.

Most World Series

- 18 – Bill Klem – 1908, 1909, 1911†, 1912†, 1913†, 1914, 1915†, 1917, 1918, 1920†, 1922†, 1924, 1926, 1929†, 1931†, 1932, 1934, 1940†
- 10 – Hank O'Day – 1903†, 1905, 1907†, 1908, 1910, 1916, 1918†, 1920, 1923, 1926
- 10 – Cy Rigler – 1910, 1912, 1913, 1915, 1917, 1919†, 1921†, 1925†, 1928, 1930
- 8 – Tommy Connolly – 1903, 1908, 1910†, 1911, 1913, 1916†, 1920, 1924†
- 8 – Bill Dinneen – 1911, 1914†, 1916, 1920, 1924, 1926†, 1929, 1932†
- 8 – Bill McGowan – 1928, 1931, 1935, 1939†, 1941†, 1944, 1947†, 1950
- 8 – Bill Summers – 1936, 1939, 1942, 1945†, 1948, 1951†, 1955†, 1959†
- 7 – Al Barlick – 1946, 1950, 1951, 1954†, 1958†, 1962†, 1967
- 6 – Billy Evans – 1909, 1912, 1915, 1917, 1919, 1923†
- 6 – Ernie Quigley – 1916, 1919, 1921, 1924, 1927†, 1935
- 6 – Babe Pinelli – 1939, 1941, 1947, 1948, 1952†, 1956†
- 6 – Jim Honochick – 1952, 1955, 1960, 1962, 1968, 1972
- 6 – Ed Montague – 1986, 1991, 1997†, 2000†, 2004†, 2007†
- 6 – Joe West – 1992, 1997, 2005†, 2009, 2012, 2016
- 6 – Gerry Davis – 1996, 1999, 2004, 2009†, 2012†, 2017†

Most World Series games

- 104 – Bill Klem
- 62 – Cy Rigler
- 57 – Hank O'Day
- 47 – Bill Summers
- 45 – Tommy Connolly
- 45 – Bill Dinneen
- 43 – Bill McGowan
- 42 – Al Barlick
- 42 – Jim Honochick

=== League Championship Series ===
A League Championship Series has been played in each league from 1969 to the present, excluding 1994, and ultimately determines the participants of the World Series. Originally a best-of-five series, it was expanded to best-of-seven in 1985. Below are umpires who have participated in at least seven League Championship Series:

- 12 – Jerry Crawford – NL: 1980, 1983, 1985, 1990, 1993, 1995, 1996, 1999, 2001†, 2003†; AL: 2005†, 2006†
- 11 – Gerry Davis – NL: 1990, 1992, 1995, 1998, 2001, 2005, 2013†, 2014†, 2018†; AL: 2000, 2010†
- 10 – Bruce Froemming – 1973, 1977, 1980, 1982, 1985, 1989, 1991, 1993†, 1997†, 2000† (all NL)
- 10 – Joe West – NL: 1981, 1986, 1988, 1993, 1996; AL: 2003, 2004, 2013†, 2014†, 2018†
- 10 – Ted Barrett – AL: 2005, 2020; NL: 2008, 2009, 2010, 2012, 2013, 2015†, 2016, 2022†
- 9 – Doug Harvey – 1970, 1972, 1976, 1980, 1983, 1984, 1986†, 1989†, 1991† (all NL)
- 9 – Paul Runge – 1977, 1981, 1982, 1984, 1985, 1988, 1990, 1995†, 1996† (all NL)
- 9 – Mike Reilly – AL: 1983, 1987, 1991, 1996, 1997, 2006; NL: 2001, 2003, 2008†
- 9 – Tim McClelland – AL: 1988, 1995, 1999†, 2003†, 2008†, 2009†; NL: 2001, 2005†, 2007†
- 9 – Randy Marsh – NL: 1989, 1992, 1995, 2002†, 2009†; AL: 2000, 2004†, 2005, 2007†
- 9 – Jeff Nelson – NL: 2002, 2010; AL: 2004, 2011, 2012, 2015, 2016, 2019†, 2020†
- 9 – **Bill Miller** – AL: 2009, 2018, 2021†; NL: 2011, 2012, 2014, 2015, 2019†, 2024†
- 8 – John McSherry – 1974, 1978, 1983, 1984, 1985, 1988, 1990, 1992†; (all NL)
- 8 – Angel Hernandez – AL: 2000, 2003, 2008, 2010; NL: 2001, 2004, 2007, 2016
- 8 – **Dan Iassogna** – NL: 2010, 2020, 2023†; AL: 2013, 2014, 2015, 2021, 2024†
- 7 – Harry Wendelstedt – 1970, 1972, 1977, 1981, 1982, 1988†, 1990† (all NL)
- 7 – Larry Barnett – 1972, 1976, 1979†, 1982†, 1986†, 1991†, 1996† (all AL)
- 7 – Jim Evans – 1975, 1979, 1983, 1985, 1990, 1993†, 1998† (all AL)
- 7 – Terry Tata – 1976, 1980, 1983†, 1985, 1989, 1993, 1998† (all NL)
- 7 – Ed Montague – NL: 1979, 1987, 1992, 1996, 1999†; AL: 2001†, 2002†
- 7 – Derryl Cousins – AL: 1985, 1989, 1995, 2003, 2006, 2008; NL: 2010†
- 7 – Tim Welke – AL: 1991, 1998, 2001, 2011†; NL: 2002, 2004†, 2006†
- 7 – Brian Gorman – AL: 2002, 2007, 2008, 2010, 2014, 2016†; NL: 2018
- 7 – Fieldin Culbreth – AL: 2000, 2009, 2010, 2011; NL: 2003, 2006, 2019
- 7 – Mike Everitt – AL: 2002, 2016, 2019; NL: 2003, 2008, 2011, 2013

Most League Championship Series games (umpires with at least 35 games are listed)

- 64 – Jerry Crawford
- 64 – Gerry Davis
- 60 – Joe West
- 54 – Ted Barrett
- 52 – Bruce Froemming
- 50 – Tim McClelland
- 47 – Randy Marsh
- 46 – Mike Reilly
- 45 – **Bill Miller**
- 43 – Paul Runge
- 42 – Angel Hernandez
- 41 – Derryl Cousins
- 41 – Tim Welke
- 41 – Brian Gorman
- 41 – **Dan Iassogna**
- 40 – Ed Montague
- 40 – Fieldin Culbreth
- 39 – John McSherry
- 38 – Doug Harvey
- 37 – Mike Everitt
- 36 – Larry Barnett

=== Division Series ===
Since 1995 (with one preliminary instance in 1981), the teams participating in the League Championship Series have been determined through four Division Series, with two series per league. All have been best-of-five series. Listed below are umpires who have participated in at least nine Division Series:

- 13 – Gerry Davis – NL: 1996, 1999, 2004, 2006†, 2008, 2009†, 2012†, 2012†, 2015†; AL: 2002†, 2003, 2007, 2011†, 2017†
- 12 – Dale Scott – AL: 1995, 1997, 1998, 2005, 2011†, 2015†; NL: 2001, 2003, 2004†, 2007†, 2008†, 2014†
- 12 – Ted Barrett – NL: 2000, 2002, 2006, 2018†, 2019†; 2021†; AL: 2001, 2003, 2007, 2011, 2014† 2017†
- 12 – Angel Hernandez – NL: 1997, 1998, 2002, 2005, 2009, 2011, 2020, 2021; AL: 2012, 2015, 2017, 2018
- 12 – **Ron Kulpa** – AL: 2001, 2007, 2008, 2015, 2020, 2021; NL: 2002, 2006, 2009, 2011, 2016, 2017
- 12 – **Alfonso Márquez** – NL: 2001, 2011, 2012, 2018, 2019, 2020, 2021†; AL: 2002, 2005, 2006, 2015, 2023†
- 11 – Dana DeMuth – NL: 1996, 1997, 1999, 2008†, 2009†, 2010†, 2015†; AL: 2001†, 2012†, 2013†, 2017†
- 11 – Jerry Layne – NL: 1995, 1998, 2002, 2005, 2010, 2011†, 2013†, 2014, 2017†; AL: 2001, 2018†
- 11 – Mike Winters – NL: 1998†, 1999†, 2001, 2006, 2010, 2014†, 2015; AL: 2000, 2002, 2013, 2018†
- 11 – **Mark Wegner** – NL: 2003, 2008, 2010, 2012, 2020†; AL: 2004, 2006, 2009, 2013, 2017, 2019†
- 11 – **Bill Miller** – NL: 2002, 2003, 2013, 2017, 2020†, 2023†; AL: 2005, 2008, 2010, 2016†, 2022†
- 10 – Brian Gorman – NL: 1997, 1999†, 2000, 2001, 2003, 2006; AL: 2004, 2009, 2011, 2012†
- 10 – Gary Darling – NL: 1995, 1997, 1998, 2002; AL: 2003, 2005†, 2007†, 2008, 2010, 2013†
- 10 – Jim Joyce – AL: 1995, 1998†, 1999†, 2002, 2003, 2009; NL: 2001, 2008, 2012, 2013
- 10 – John Hirschbeck – AL: 1995, 1998, 1999, 2005†; NL: 2001, 2003†, 2006†, 2010†, 2013†, 2016†
- 10 – Eric Cooper – AL: 2003, 2008, 2009, 2011, 2012, 2018, 2019; NL: 2005, 2006, 2014
- 10 – Tom Hallion – NL: 1996, 1997, 2008, 2012, 2014, 2016, 2018, 2019; AL: 2013, 2021†
- 10 – Greg Gibson – AL: 2001, 2003, 2009, 2010, 2011; NL: 2004, 2006, 2007, 2015, 2021
- 9 – Bruce Froemming – NL: 1981, 1995, 1996, 1998, 1999, 2001†, 2002†, 2003†; AL: 2007†
- 9 – Tim Tschida – AL: 1996, 1997, 1998, 2006, 2007, 2008, 2009†; NL: 2001, 2002
- 9 – Jeff Kellogg – NL: 1998, 2000, 2003, 2007, 2011, 2016†; AL: 2008, 2010, 2014†
- 9 – Paul Emmel – NL: 2002, 2008, 2010, 2012; AL: 2003, 2006, 2009, 2013, 2016
- 9 – Mike Everitt – NL: 2001, 2007, 2009; AL: 2004, 2005, 2006, 2012, 2015, 2017
- 9 – Gary Cederstrom – NL: 2000, 2003, 2005, 2010, 2011, 2015†, 2018†; AL: 2004, 2019†
- 9 – Jerry Meals – NL: 1999, 2009, 2011, 2014; AL: 2004, 2005, 2010, 2019, 2020†
- 9 – **Mark Carlson** – AL: 2005, 2011, 2012, 2020†, 2024†; NL: 2007, 2015, 2022†, 2023†

Most Division Series games (umpires with at least 35 games are listed)

- 53 – Gerry Davis
- 52 – **Ron Kulpa**
- 50 – **Alfonso Márquez**
- 48 – Angel Hernandez
- 47 - Ted Barrett
- 45 – **Jerry Layne**
- 45 – Mike Winters
- 44 – Dana DeMuth
- 43 – Dale Scott
- 42 – Jim Joyce
- 41 – Tom Hallion
- 41 – **Bill Miller**
- 40 – Eric Cooper
- 40 – Brian Gorman
- 40 – Greg Gibson
- 40 – **Mark Wegner**
- 39 – Gary Darling
- 39 – Jerry Meals
- 37 – Bruce Froemming
- 36 – Jeff Kellogg
- 35 – John Hirschbeck
- 35 – Mike Everitt
- 35 – Gary Cederstrom
- 35 – Tim Welke

=== Wild Card Series ===
In 2012, the Wild Card Game was introduced as a single playoff game that would determine which wild card teams from each league would participate in the Division Series. Due to the impact of the COVID-19 pandemic in 2020, a best-of-three series was instituted. A similar format was made permanent for the 2022 postseason. Listed below are umpires who have participated in at least five Wild Card events:

- 7 – **Bill Miller** – AL: 2012, 2014, 2015, 2019†, 2024†; NL: 2018†, 2020†
- 6 – Ted Barrett – 2012, 2013, 2015†, 2016, 2020†, 2022† (all AL)
- 6 – **Chris Guccione** – AL: 2012, 2019; NL: 2017, 2018, 2020, 2022
- 6 – Jeff Nelson – NL: 2012, 2015, 2016, 2019†, 2022†; AL: 2020†
- 5 – **James Hoye** – AL: 2014, 2021; NL: 2018, 2020, 2023
- 5 – **Dan Iassogna** – NL: 2013, 2020†, 2024†; AL: 2014, 2023†
- 5 – **Jordan Baker** – NL: 2017, 2023; AL: 2020, 2021, 2024
- 5 – **Alan Porter** – AL: 2018; NL: 2020, 2021, 2023†, 2024†
- 5 – **Mark Wegner** – NL: 2014, 2018, 2020, 2024; AL: 2023
- 5 – **David Rackley** – AL: 2016, 2020, 2024; NL: 2017, 2019

Most Wild Card games

- 10 – **Bill Miller**
- 9 – Ted Barrett
- 9 – **Chris Guccione**
- 9 – **Alan Porter**
- 8 – Jeff Nelson
- 8 – **James Hoye**
- 8 – **Jordan Baker**
- 8 – **Dan Iassogna**
- 8 – **Mark Wegner**
- 7 – **David Rackley**

=== Total postseason ===
Most games (umpires with 90 or more postseason games are listed)

- 151 – Gerry Davis
- 138 – Ted Barrett
- 132 – Joe West
- 124 – **Bill Miller**
- 118 – **Alfonso Marquez**
- 111 – Bruce Froemming
- 111 – Jerry Crawford
- 105 – Jeff Nelson
- 104 – Bill Klem
- 104 – Gary Cederstrom
- 103 – Mike Winters
- 101 – Dana DeMuth
- 101 – Angel Hernandez
- 99 – Jeff Kellogg
- 99 – Ed Montague
- 98 – Tim Welke
- 96 – Brian Gorman
- 94 – Tim McClelland
- 94 – John Hirschbeck
- 94 – **Dan Iassogna**
- 91 – Dale Scott

== All-Star Games ==
The home plate umpire for each All-Star Game is denoted by a † following the year. There were two All-Star Games each year from 1959 to 1962; different umpiring crews were used for the games in each year except 1960 (for this list, the 1960 umpires are each counted once). For all games through the first 1961 contest and again in 1966, the umpires changed positions halfway through the game; both plate umpires are noted in the applicable years.

- 7 – Al Barlick – 1942, 1949†, 1952†, 1955†, 1959† (first game), 1966†, 1970†
- 7 – Doug Harvey – 1963, 1964, 1971, 1977, 1982†, 1987, 1992†
- 7 – Bill Summers – 1936†, 1941†, 1946†, 1949†, 1952†, 1955†, 1959† (second game)
- 6 – Jocko Conlan – 1943, 1947†, 1950, 1953†, 1958†, 1962† (second game)
- 6 – Eddie Rommel – 1939, 1943†, 1946, 1950, 1954†, 1958†
- 6 – Frank Secory – 1955, 1958, 1961 (second game), 1964, 1967, 1970
- 5 – Charlie Berry – 1944, 1948†, 1952, 1956†, 1959 (second game)
- 5 – Nestor Chylak – 1957, 1960 (†second game), 1964, 1973†, 1978
- 5 – Johnny Stevens – 1950, 1953, 1957†, 1960, 1965†

== See also ==
- List of Major League Baseball umpires (disambiguation)
- Umpire (baseball)
