= List of Boston Red Sox no-hitters =

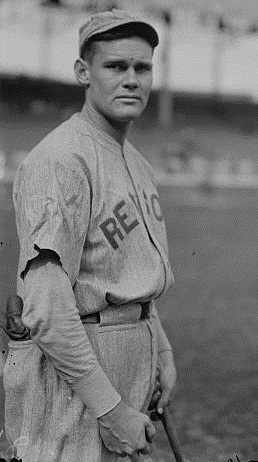
Dutch Leonard pitched no-hitters for the Red Sox in 1916 and 1918.

The Boston Red Sox are a Major League Baseball franchise based in Boston, Massachusetts, also known in their early years as the "Boston Americans" (1901–1907). They play in the American League East division. Pitchers for the Red Sox have thrown 18 no-hitters in franchise history.

A no-hitter is officially recognized by Major League Baseball "when a pitcher (or pitchers) allows no hits during the entire course of a game, which consists of at least nine innings. In a no-hit game, a batter may reach base via a walk, an error, a hit by pitch, a passed ball or wild pitch on strike three, or catcher's interference." (No-hitters of less than nine complete innings were previously recognized by the league as official; however, several rule alterations in 1991 changed the rule to its current form.)

One perfect game, a special subcategory of no-hitter, has been pitched in Red Sox history. As defined by Major League Baseball, "in a perfect game, no batter reaches any base during the course of the game." Every opposing batter is retired. This feat was achieved by Cy Young in 1904. Young's perfect game, pitched on May 5, 1904, also was the first no-hitter in Red Sox history; the most recent Red Sox no-hitter was thrown by Jon Lester on May 19, 2008.

Two pitchers have thrown more than one no-hitter in a Red Sox uniform, Hall of Famer Cy Young and Dutch Leonard. Thirteen of the Red Sox no-hitters were thrown at home (the first four at the Huntington Avenue Grounds and the other nine at Fenway Park) and five on the road. Two were thrown in April, two in May, five in June, two in July, three in August, and four in September. The longest interval between Red Sox no-hitters was 35 years, 6 months, and 18 days, between the games pitched by Dave Morehead, on September 16, 1965 and Hideo Nomo, on April 4, 2001. The shortest interval between Red Sox no-hitters was merely 1 month and 6 days, between the games pitched by Earl Wilson on June 26, 1962 and Bill Monbouquette on August 1, 1962.

The Red Sox have no-hit the Chicago White Sox and Baltimore Orioles (formerly the "St. Louis Browns") the most: four times each. The White Sox were no-hit by Jesse Tannehill in 1904, Bill Dinneen in 1905, Parnell in 1956, and Monbouquette in 1962. The Browns and Orioles were no-hit by Smoky Joe Wood in 1911, Leonard in 1916, Hideo Nomo in 2001, and Clay Buchholz in 2007. The Red Sox have won all of their no-hitters (three times in major league history a team has thrown a nine-inning no-hitter and lost the game). The most baserunners allowed in a Red Sox no-hitter was five, by Dutch Leonard in 1918. Of the 18 Red Sox no-hitters, four have been won by a score of 4–0 and another four by a score of 2–0, making those final scores more common than any other results. The largest margin of victory in a Red Sox no-hitter was 10–0, in wins by Derek Lowe in 2002 and Clay Buchholz in 2007. The smallest margin of victory was 1–0, Monbouquette's no-hitter in 1962.

12 different managers have led the team during the franchise's 18 no-hitters. 15 different home plate umpires presided over the franchise's 18 no-hitters. Jason Varitek caught four of the team's no-hitters, setting a major-league record for no-hitters caught by a catcher, which has since been tied by Carlos Ruiz.

== List of no-hitters in Red Sox history ==
¶	Indicates a perfect game
£	Pitcher was left-handed
*	Member of the National Baseball Hall of Fame and Museum

#	Date	Pitcher	Final score	Base- runners	Opponent	Catcher	Plate umpire	Manager	Notes	Ref
1	May 5, 1904	Cy Young^{¶}* (1)	3–0	0	Philadelphia Athletics	Lou Criger (1)	Bob Caruthers	Jimmy Collins (1)	First no-hitter in franchise history; First perfect game in Red Sox history and 3rd in MLB history (First in the MLB Modern Era); First franchise's no-hitter at home; First right-handed pitcher to throw a no-hitter in franchise history	
2	August 17, 1904	Jesse Tannehill^{£}	6–0	1	Chicago White Sox	Duke Farrell	Frank Dwyer	Jimmy Collins (2)	First left-handed pitcher to throw a no-hitter in franchise history	
3	September 27, 1905	Bill Dinneen	2–0	2	Chicago White Sox	Lou Criger (2)	Jack Sheridan	Jimmy Collins (3)	First game of a doubleheader; Latest calendar date of franchise's no-hitter; Last no-hitter for Americans as a team name	
4	June 30, 1908	Cy Young* (2)	8–0	1	@ New York Highlanders	Lou Criger (3)	Silk O'Laughlin (1)	Deacon McGuire	First Red Sox no-hitter on the road; First no-hitter since the franchise was renamed to Red Sox; First pitcher to pitch multiple no-hitters for the Red Sox	
5	July 29, 1911	Smoky Joe Wood	5–0	4	St. Louis Browns	Bill Carrigan (1)	Silk O'Laughlin (2)	Patsy Donovan	First game of a doubleheader; Last Red Sox no-hitter at Huntington Avenue Grounds	
6	June 21, 1916	Rube Foster	2–0	2	New York Yankees	Bill Carrigan (2)	George Hildebrand	Bill Carrigan (1)	First Red Sox no-hitter at Fenway Park	
7	August 30, 1916	Dutch Leonard^{£} (1)	4–0	2	St. Louis Browns	Bill Carrigan (3)	Brick Owens (1)	Bill Carrigan (2)		
8	June 23, 1917	Babe Ruth^{£}* (0 IP); Ernie Shore (9 IP)	4–0	1	Washington Senators	Pinch Thomas (1); Sam Agnew (1)	Brick Owens (2)	Jack Barry	First combined no-hitter in MLB history. First game of a doubleheader. Ruth and Thomas were ejected for arguing balls and strikes after walking the first batter, who was then caught stealing. Shore retired the next 26 in a row for a no-hitter completely in relief.	
9	June 3, 1918	Dutch Leonard^{£} (2)	5–0	5	@ Detroit Tigers	Sam Agnew (2)	Bill Dinneen (1)	Ed Barrow	Last pitcher to pitch multiple no-hitters for the Red Sox	
10	September 7, 1923	Howard Ehmke	4–0	1	@ Philadelphia Athletics	Val Picinich	Bill Dinneen (2)	Frank Chance		
11	July 14, 1956	Mel Parnell^{£}	4–0	3	Chicago White Sox	Sammy White	Bill Summers	Pinky Higgins (1)	Second game of a doubleheader	
12	June 26, 1962	Earl Wilson	2–0	4	Los Angeles Angels	Bob Tillman (1)	Harry Schwarts	Pinky Higgins (2)	Wilson hit a home run	
13	August 1, 1962	Bill Monbouquette	1–0	1	@ Chicago White Sox	Jim Pagliaroni	Bill McKinley	Pinky Higgins (3)	Smallest margin of victory in a franchise's no-hitter; Shortest interval between no-hitters in franchise history	
14	September 16, 1965	Dave Morehead	2–0	1	Cleveland Indians	Bob Tillman (2)	Ed Runge	Billy Herman	On the same day, the Red Sox fired Pinky Higgins as their general manager	
15	April 4, 2001	Hideo Nomo	3–0	4	@ Baltimore Orioles	Jason Varitek (1)	Eric Cooper	Jimy Williams	Made Red Sox debut for Nomo; Game 2 of season; Longest interval between no-hitters in franchise history; Earliest calendar date of franchise's no-hitter; First and only no-hitter thrown at Camden Yards	
16	April 27, 2002	Derek Lowe	10–0	2	Tampa Bay Devil Rays	Jason Varitek (2)	Steve Rippley	Grady Little	Shortest interval between no-hitters at Fenway Park in franchise history; Largest margin of victory in a franchise's no-hitter (tie)	
17	September 1, 2007	Clay Buchholz	10–0	4	Baltimore Orioles	Jason Varitek (3)	Joe West	Terry Francona (1)	Second career game for Buchholz; Largest margin of victory in a franchise's no-hitter (tie)	
18	May 19, 2008	Jon Lester^{£}	7–0	3	Kansas City Royals	Jason Varitek (4)	Brian Knight	Terry Francona (2)	Most recent no-hitter in franchise history; First time since the 1974 California Angels that one team had last two no-hitters in the Majors; Varitek sets the record for most no-hitters caught	

== See also ==
- List of Major League Baseball no-hitters
