= Lord Byron (umpire) =

American baseball umpire (1872–1955)

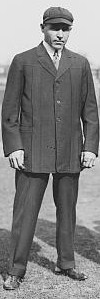
- Byron as a National League umpire
- Born: William Jeremiah Byron; September 18, 1872; New York, New York, U.S.
- Died: December 27, 1955 (aged 83); Ypsilanti, Michigan, U.S.
- Other names: "Lord" "The Singing Umpire"
- Occupation: Umpire
- Years active: 1913–1919
- Employer: National League

William Jeremiah "Lord" Byron (September 18, 1872 – December 27, 1955) was an American Major League Baseball umpire. Byron was known as the "Singing Umpire", because he would occasionally sing his calls.

== Career ==
Byron began umpiring in the Michigan State League in 1896. He would then work in the South Atlantic League from 1905 to 1907. From 1908 to 1912, Byron umpired games for the Virginia League, Eastern League, Southern Association, and the International League.

Byron made his major league umpiring debut on April 10, 1913 for the National League. He would work in the NL from 1913 until 1919, umpiring 1,012 games and the 1914 World Series with Bill Dinneen, Bill Klem, and George Hildebrand.

He returned to the minor leagues with the Pacific Coast League from 1920 to 1924, and then retired from umpiring. Following a game in Sacramento, California on September 20, 1923, Byron and his fellow umpire were chased out of the ballpark by a violent crowd of angry fans. A rock thrown at him hit San Francisco Seals player Archie Yelle in the face.

Whenever a batter complained about being called out on strikes, Byron would recite a poem:

Let me tell you something, friend
Before you grow much older
You cannot improve your average, Sir
With the bat upon your shoulder.

== Late life and death ==
Byron died in Ypsilanti, Michigan.

== See also ==
- List of Major League Baseball umpires (disambiguation)
