= Bruce Froemming =

American baseball umpire (1939–2026)

- Froemming with Alex Rodriguez
- Born: Bruce Neal Froemming; September 28, 1939; Milwaukee, Wisconsin, U.S.
- Died: February 25, 2026 (aged 86); Milwaukee, Wisconsin, U.S.
- Occupation: Umpire
- Years active: 1971–1999 (NL), 2000–2007 (MLB)
- Employer(s): National League, Major League Baseball

Bruce Neal Froemming (/ˈfrɛmɪŋ/; September 28, 1939 – February 25, 2026) was an American baseball umpire who worked in Major League Baseball from 1971 to 2007, spending a majority of his career in the National League (NL). He first umpired in the NL in 1971, and from 2000 to 2007 worked throughout both major leagues. Early in the 2007 season, Froemming tied Bill Klem for the most seasons umpired. Previously, on August 16, 2006, Froemming umpired his 5,000th game between the Detroit Tigers and Boston Red Sox at Fenway Park, making him the second umpire to reach that milestone; Klem retired after 5,374 games. Froemming stands third on the all-time list of games umpired, having been passed when Joe West officiated his 5,164th major league game on August 14, 2019. He worked his final regular-season game at age 68 years 2 days on September 30, 2007, manning the third base position as the Milwaukee Brewers hosted the San Diego Padres in his native Milwaukee. Because Froemming was then over age 65, he became eligible for election to the Baseball Hall of Fame in 2010 instead of having to wait the customary five years.

== Career ==
After a brief semi-pro playing career, Froemming became the youngest umpire in professional baseball in 1958 at age 18, working his way up through the minor leagues to the Pacific Coast League before joining the NL staff in April 1971. While in the minor leagues, his work had caught the attention of skilled observers such as Hall of Famer Jocko Conlan. Froemming became one of the NL's six crew chiefs in 1988. He also refereed high school basketball games, and was recommended for the NBA by Al McGuire, but declined the opportunity when NL umpire Al Barlick helped him in his advancement to the major leagues. In Froemming's first season, he was on Barlick's crew. In Barlick's first season, 1941, he worked three games with Klem.

Froemming worked in five World Series: 1976, 1984, 1988, 1990 (Games 3–4) and 1995. He umpired in the League Championship Series in 1973, 1977, 1980, 1982, 1985, 1989, 1991, 1993, 1997 and 2000, all in the NL. With his tenth appearance in the LCS in 2000, he broke the record he had previously shared with Doug Harvey; Jerry Crawford tied the record in 2003, and broke it with his 11th LCS in 2005. (Froemming and Crawford share the record of 10 NLCS, as two of Crawford's 12 were in the American League.)

Froemming also officiated in a record nine Division Series: 1981 (East Division), 1995, 1996, 1998, 1999, 2001, 2002, 2003 and 2007 (all but the last in the NL). He was the home plate umpire for the playoff games to determine the NL wild-card team in both 1998 and 1999. He also umpired in the All-Star Game in 1975 (played at County Stadium in his hometown of Milwaukee), 1986, and 2007, calling balls and strikes for the last two contests.

In the 2003 NLDS, Froemming surpassed Klem's record of working in 103 career postseason games (all Klem's games were in the World Series), ending the series with 107 games; Jerry Crawford passed him with 108 games upon working in the 2006 ALCS, but Froemming regained the record in the 2007 ALDS. In Game 1 of the 2012 World Series, Gerry Davis (also a native of Wisconsin) surpassed Froemming's record when he worked his 112th postseason game.

Froemming ended his career having officiated in 22 World Series games, 52 NLCS games, and 37 Division Series games—a total of 111 postseason games; he also umpired in 5,163 regular season games, and three All-Star Games.

Froemming was known for his extremely loud and enthusiastic strike call. He wore uniform number 6 beginning in the late 1970s, and kept the number when the umpiring staffs of the AL and NL were merged in 2000. Los Angeles Times sports editor Bill Dwyre described him as "one of the game's true characters and legends," also calling him the prototypical umpire: "If Hollywood did a movie, they'd send 27 yuppies to study him. Often regarded as stern and stubborn, Froemming nonetheless occasionally displayed a sense of humor; when Fox Sports wired umpires with microphones for broadcasts of Saturday games in 2007, Froemming looked toward the huge baseball glove beyond AT&T Park's outfield wall and wondered aloud whether Fox analyst Eric Karros had ever hit a ball that far.

For his final season, Froemming's crew included Brian Runge, the son of Paul Runge, who served on the NL staff from 1973 to 1997; Froemming has recalled that he used to baby-sit for Brian.

Froemming was also associated with the Joe Brinkman umpire school in Cocoa, Florida, which was renamed the Brinkman/Froemming umpire school several years prior to its closing in 1998.

== Memorable games ==
Froemming was the plate umpire (wearing number 16) when Milt Pappas was going for a perfect game on September 2, 1972, against the San Diego Padres, but made a ball four call on the 27th batter, Larry Stahl, which cost Pappas the perfect game, though he still pitched a no-hitter. The call remains controversial.

Froemming was the first base umpire (wearing number 5) when he ejected New York Yankees manager Billy Martin in Game Four of the 1976 World Series in the top of the ninth inning, the first World Series managerial ejection since Earl Weaver was tossed by umpire Shag Crawford in the 1969 World Series.

Froemming is reviled in Philadelphia for a call in the 1977 National League Championship Series. In Game 3 of the series, the Philadelphia Phillies led the Los Angeles Dodgers by a run with two outs in the ninth with Manny Mota on third. Davey Lopes hit a smash that struck third baseman Mike Schmidt in the knee and caromed to shortstop Larry Bowa, who fired to first. Lopes was called safe, and the Dodgers went on to win the game and the series in four games.

On September 26, 1981, he was behind the plate for Nolan Ryan's record 5th no-hitter.

Froemming worked his first perfect game as the first base umpire for Dennis Martinez's perfect game on July 28, 1991.

On April 6, 2001, Froemming was the home plate umpire for the first game at Miller Park in his hometown of Milwaukee.

On September 3, 2001, Froemming was the second base umpire for the no-hitter pitched by Bud Smith of the St. Louis Cardinals. That game marked the record 11th time he had umpired in an official no-hitter having previously shared the record of 10 with Silk O'Loughlin, Paul Pryor and Jim McKean. He also umpired in a near no-hitter on July 26, 1991, two days prior to Martinez's perfect game. Montreal's Mark Gardner held the Dodgers without a hit for nine innings before he and Jeff Fassero surrendered three hits in the 10th inning. The game was once considered an official no-hitter prior to rule clarification in 1991, and the MLB no longer recognizes games of nine hitless innings as no-hitters if hits are given up in extra innings.

On July 24, 2004, he was the plate umpire in the famous game between the New York Yankees and Boston Red Sox that involved a brawl initiated by Jason Varitek's punch of Yankees third baseman Alex Rodriguez which resulted in both players getting ejected by Froemming.

On June 28, 2007, Froemming was at first base when Toronto Blue Jay Frank Thomas hit his 500th career home run off Minnesota Twins pitcher Carlos Silva. Later in the game, Thomas was ejected by plate umpire Mark Wegner for arguing balls and strikes, with Toronto manager John Gibbons also getting thrown out.

== Controversy ==
A commanding presence on the field who was fined by National League and Major League Baseball on more than one occasion for his public comments and behavior, Froemming has acknowledged that "the one moment I would take back if I could" was in January 2003 when he referred to an umpire administrator as a "stupid Jew bitch" during a dispute over a relatively minor conflict over travel arrangements to Japan; the comment was made at the end of a voicemail message, apparently after Froemming thought the call had ended. He was given a 10-day suspension without pay for the incident, which he accepted after making a public apology. Froemming was also fined in 1996 for going into the Los Angeles Dodgers' clubhouse before a game in New York against the Mets to get Mike Piazza's autograph. Froemming told Piazza that catcher Johnny Bench refused to sign baseballs for him once and proceeded to go 0 for 4 that day with three strikeouts.

New York Yankees owner George Steinbrenner blamed Froemming for not delaying Game 2 of the 2007 American League Division Series between the Yankees and the Cleveland Indians, in which an infestation of Lake Erie gnats swarmed around Yankees reliever Joba Chamberlain, who afterward lost a 1–0 lead in the 8th inning.

Froemming was calling balls and strikes on September 2, 1972, when Cubs pitcher Milt Pappas had a perfect game with two outs and a 1–2 count in the ninth inning before walking the 27th batter (pinch-hitter Larry Stahl); Pappas then completed the no-hitter, but later criticized Froemming for wasting his chance at immortality. The umpire notes, "It's gotten ugly now. Right after the game, he said the 3–2 pitch had missed, but as time has gone on, that pitch has gotten better and better."

== No-hitters ==
Froemming umpired in a record 11 official no-hitters in the major leagues:

- April 16, 1972 (second base) – Burt Hooton, Chicago Cubs 4–0 vs. Philadelphia Phillies
- September 2, 1972 (home plate) – Milt Pappas, Chicago Cubs 8–0 vs. San Diego Padres
- August 5, 1973 (third base) – Phil Niekro, Atlanta Braves 9–0 vs. San Diego Padres
- August 24, 1975 (home plate) – Ed Halicki, San Francisco Giants 6–0 vs. New York Mets
- September 26, 1981 (home plate) – Nolan Ryan, Houston Astros 5–0 vs. Los Angeles Dodgers
- September 26, 1983 (third base) – Bob Forsch, St. Louis Cardinals 3–0 vs. Montreal Expos
- July 28, 1991 (first base) – Dennis Martínez, Montreal Expos 2–0 at Los Angeles Dodgers – perfect game
- August 17, 1992 (first base) – Kevin Gross, Los Angeles Dodgers 2–0 vs. San Francisco Giants
- September 8, 1993 (second base) – Darryl Kile, Houston Astros 7–1 vs. New York Mets
- June 25, 1999 (home plate) – José Jiménez, St. Louis Cardinals 1–0 at Arizona Diamondbacks
- September 3, 2001 (second base) – Bud Smith, St. Louis Cardinals 4–0 at San Diego Padres

== Quotes ==
It's great to see a young umpire like that. He's a nice boy, conscientious, hardworking, a million-dollar heart. And guts. They told me that he put an announcer out of the ball park one night in Tulsa. The announcer made some remark or other over the public address system about the umpire. Froemming stopped the game, turned to the announcer and said, 'Get out.' When I heard about that, I said, 'This is something.' I'd like to see that, making an announcer leave the ball park.

— Jocko Conlan, in his 1967 autobiography Jocko

The sun is 93 million miles away, and I can see that.

— Froemming, when asked about his eyesight

For him, it's a calling, not a job. Something like holy orders. A sacrament, not a profession.

— sportswriter Jim Murray

== Personal life and death ==
Froemming married Rosemarie Loch in 1957 and they had two sons, Steven and Kevin. Froemming died in Milwaukee, Wisconsin, on February 25, 2026, at the age of 86. He fell in his home in Mequon, Wisconsin, the previous day and was taken to Ascension Columbia St. Mary's Hospital in Milwaukee. Doctors determined that he had a brain bleed that they were unable to stop because he was taking blood thinners. He was survived by his wife, two sons, and two grandchildren.

== See also ==
- List of Major League Baseball umpires (disambiguation)
