= Lee Ballanfant =

American baseball umpire (1895-1987)

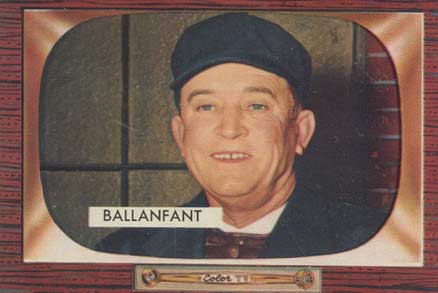
- Born: Edward Lee Ballanfant; December 27, 1895; Waco, Texas, U.S.
- Died: July 15, 1987 (aged 91); Dallas, Texas, U.S.
- Occupation: Umpire
- Years active: 1920s–1950s
- Spouse: Viola Darwin

Edward Lee Ballanfant (December 27, 1895 – July 15, 1987) was an American umpire in Major League Baseball (MLB). He was a player-manager in minor league baseball before his MLB umpiring career. As an umpire, he worked four World Series and four All-Star Games. After his umpiring days, Ballanfant spent many years as a major league scout.

== Career ==
Ballanfant was a minor league infielder from 1915 to 1925. In 1925 he served as player-manager for the Greenville Hunters for part of the season. He suffered a career-ending leg injury that season. Ballanfant began umpiring in the Lone Star League in 1927–1928, then moved on to the Texas League from 1929 to 1935. Ballanfant made his major league umpiring debut in 1936 in the National League (NL), where he stayed for 22 years. He umpired the 1940, 1946, 1951, and 1955 World Series. Upon his retirement from major league umpiring in 1957, Ballanfant was the NL's senior umpire.

=== Notable games ===
In a 1939 Reds-Giants matchup, Ballanfant made a fair-foul ruling that went against the Giants and set them in an uproar. Ballanfant was merely pushed by the Giants catcher, but Ballanfant's partner George Magerkurth ended up in a spitting and swinging match with shortstop Billy Jurges. Both Magerkurth and Jurges received fines and brief suspensions.

== Post-umpiring days ==
After retiring from umpiring, Ballanfant was hired as a scout for the Chicago Cubs. Ballanfant also served as a scout for the Houston Astros from 1961 to 1970 and the Texas Rangers from 1972 to 1981. He was inducted into the Texas Baseball Hall of Fame in 1980. He died in 1987. Ballanfant was posthumously inducted into the Texas Sports Hall of Fame in 1997 and the Texas League Hall of Fame in 2009.

== Personal life ==
A World War I U.S. Army veteran, Ballanfant is known to have taught courses in marksmanship in the spring before the 1942 season.

In Larry R. Gerlach's book of interviews with umpires, The Men in Blue, Ballanfant said, "I can truthfully say I never did like umpiring. I stayed with it because I had to eat."

== See also ==
- List of Major League Baseball umpires (disambiguation)
