= Roy Van Graflan =

American baseball umpire (1894–1953)

- Born: Roy R. Van Graafeiland; February 14, 1894; Rochester, New York, US
- Died: September 4, 1953 (aged 59); Rochester, New York, US
- Occupation: Umpire
- Years active: 1927-1933
- Employer: American League

Roy R. Van Graflan (born Roy R. Van Graafeiland, February 14, 1894 – September 4, 1953) was an American professional baseball umpire who worked in the American League from 1927 to 1933. Van Graflan umpired 1,034 major league games in his seven-year career. He also umpired in two World Series (1929 and 1932).

== Early career ==
In 1926, while umpiring in the minor leagues, Van Graflan was knocked out by a punch from manager Bud Ryan. The manager was suspended for nearly a month.

== Notable games ==
=== Ruth's home run in 1932 World Series ===
Van Graflan was behind the plate for Babe Ruth's called shot in game three of the 1932 World Series. Though there is debate about whether Ruth deliberately pointed to the outfield to predict a home run, Van Graflan stated that Ruth looked over to the heckling Cubs bench and said, "Let him put this one over and I'll knock it over the wall out there."

== Death ==
He died from injuries he sustained in an automobile accident in 1953.

== See also ==
- List of Major League Baseball umpires (disambiguation)
