= Paul Runge (umpire) =

Canadian baseball umpire (born 1940)

- Born: October 20, 1940 (age 85); St. Catharines, Ontario, Canada
- Occupation: MLB umpire

Paul Edward Runge (born October 20, 1940) is a Canadian former umpire in Major League Baseball (MLB) who worked in the National League (NL) from 1973 to 1997.

He is the most accomplished member of the only four-generation umpiring family in major league history; his father Ed was an American League umpire from 1954 to 1970, and his son Brian was a major league umpire from 1999 to 2012. His grandson, Josh, is a current minor league umpire.

Paul Runge wore number 17 on his jacket and shirt sleeve for most of his 25-year umpiring career.

Runge graduated from Arizona State University, where he lettered in baseball, and after a brief minor league playing career in the farm systems of the Houston Colt .45s and Los Angeles Angels, he became an NL umpire after working in the California League (1965–66), Eastern League (1967) and Pacific Coast League (1968–73). He was the first son of a former major league umpire to reach the majors himself.

He officiated in four World Series (1979, 1984, 1989, 1993), and in the All-Star Games of 1978, 1986 and 1994, working behind the plate for the last contest.

He tied Doug Harvey's major league record by umpiring in nine League Championship Series – 1977, 1981, 1982, 1984 (Game 5 only), 1985, 1988, 1990, 1995 and 1996 – serving as crew chief in 1995 and 1996. The record was tied by Bruce Froemming in 1997, then Froemming broke it upon umpiring in his 10th NLCS in 2000. Runge also worked in the single-game playoff to decide the NL West division championship in 1980.

Runge was behind the plate when Charlie Lea of the Montreal Expos pitched a 4–0 no-hitter on May 10, 1981; it was the first no-hitter pitched at Olympic Stadium. He was umpiring at first base on September 25, 1986, when Mike Scott pitched a no-hitter to clinch the NL West title for the Houston Astros. He also officiated on September 28, 1988, when Orel Hershiser broke the major league record for consecutive scoreless innings pitched.

During Game 5 of the 1984 World Series, Runge was the home plate umpire when Kirk Gibson hit a home run to help the Detroit Tigers win the series over the San Diego Padres.

Runge, who resided in the San Diego area throughout his career, became the NL's director of umpires in both 1998 and 1999 before MLB reorganized its umpiring staffs.

== See also ==
- List of Major League Baseball umpires (disambiguation)
