= Jim Johnstone (umpire) =

Irish baseball umpire (1872-1927)

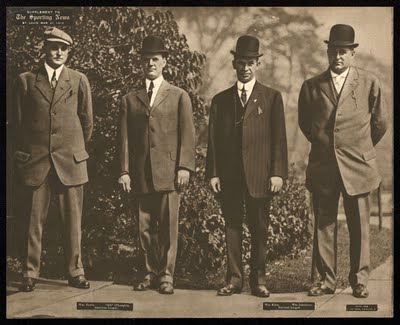
- Umpires Billy Evans, Silk O'Loughlin, Bill Klem, and Johnstone in 1909
- Born: James Edward Johnstone; December 9, 1872; Ireland
- Died: June 13, 1927 (aged 54); Cork, Ireland
- Occupation: Umpire
- Years active: 1902 (AL), 1903-1912 (NL), 1915 (FL)
- Employer(s): American League, National League, Federal League

James Edward Johnstone (December 9, 1872 - June 13, 1927) was an Irish professional baseball umpire. Johnstone worked in three Major leagues in his career, the American League (1902), National League (1903-1912), and the Federal League (1915). He umpired 1,736 major league games in his 12-year career. Johnstone umpired in the 1906, and 1909 World Series.

== Minor league pitching career ==
Johnstone pitched in the minor leagues between 1894 and 1899, once throwing a no-hitter in the Atlantic League.

== Umpiring career ==
Johnson's major league umpiring career began in 1902. After one season in the American League, he joined the National League. By 1911, Johnstone was involved in a disagreement with league president Thomas Lynch related to umpiring an unsanctioned offseason series. A 1912 salary dispute ended Johnstone's tenure in the National League.

While working in the American Association in 1914, Johnstone's jaw was broken by a punch from pitcher Bill Burns. The incident, and the light punishment received by Burns, led to Johnstone's resignation from the league. Johnstone spent his final year of umpiring in the Federal League that next season.

== Notable games ==
Johnstone umpired the July 31, 1908 Giants-Cardinals game in which Fred Tenney stole first base after having already reached second. At the time no rule prevented this tactic and Johnstone allowed Tenney to remain on first base. Tenney, in an attempt to draw a throw that might score the runner on third base, subsequently stole his way back to second base.

== Development of modern mask ==
Johnstone developed The Original Full Vision Mask, a lighter but more protective design of the umpire mask, in 1922. Johnstone distributed the mask under the company name of the Johnstone Baseball Mask Company. Johnstone's design would remain largely unchanged until the development of the hockey-style mask in the 21st century.

== Death ==
Johnstone died in June 1927 after developing an infection while on vacation in his native Ireland.
