= 1909 World Series =

1909 Major League Baseball championship series

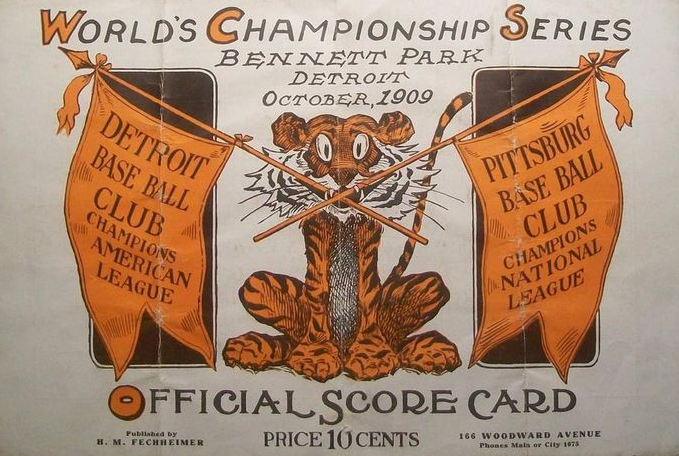
- Program from the series
Team (Wins)	Managers	Season
Pittsburgh Pirates (4)	Fred Clarke (player/manager)	110–42, .724, GA: 6 1/2
Detroit Tigers (3)	Hughie Jennings	98–54, .645, GA: 3 1/2
- Dates: October 8–16
- Venue(s): Forbes Field (Pittsburgh); Bennett Park (Detroit)
- Umpires: Jim Johnstone (NL), Billy Evans (AL), Bill Klem (NL), Silk O'Loughlin (AL)
- Hall of Famers: Umpires: Billy Evans; Bill Klem; Pirates: Fred Clarke; Honus Wagner; Vic Willis; Tigers: Sam Crawford; Ty Cobb; Hughie Jennings (manager)

The 1909 World Series was the championship series in Major League Baseball for the 1909 season. The sixth edition of the World Series, it featured the National League (NL) champion Pittsburgh Pirates (Note: In the early 20th century and earlier, the name of the city of Pittsburgh, Pennsylvania was variably spelled with or without the "h".) against the American League (AL) champion Detroit Tigers. The Pirates won the Series in seven games to capture their first championship of the modern Major League Baseball era and the second championship in the club's history. This was the first major professional sports championship ever won by a Pittsburgh-based team. This Series is best remembered for featuring two of the very best players of the time, Pittsburgh shortstop Honus Wagner, and Detroit outfielder Ty Cobb.

== Series recap ==
Sites: games 1, 2 in Pittsburgh; games 3, 4 in Detroit; game 5 in Pittsburgh; games 6, 7 in Detroit.

The Pirates had won the National League pennant in 1909 behind the brilliant play of Honus Wagner, who led the league with a .339 batting average and 100 runs batted in.

Detroit returned for their third consecutive Fall Classic, determined to erase the memories of their previous efforts. The Tigers were also backed up by the heavy bat of Ty Cobb (who had just won his third consecutive American League batting title) and a formidable pitching staff. They might have finally won the Series in their third try, had it not been for Pirates rookie Babe Adams. Manager Fred Clarke started him, on a hunch, in Game 1. Adams won that game and two more, setting a World Series record for rookies. The Tigers thus became the first AL team to win three consecutive pennants and the first team to lose three straight World Series (the New York Giants would lose three straight Series from 1911 to 1913).

The Pirates ran at will against the weak Detroit catching corps, stealing 18 bases in seven games.

For the first time, four umpires were used at the same time, with the standard plate umpire and base umpire along with two outfield umpires.

On June 14, 2009, the series' 100th anniversary was celebrated, when the Tigers and Pirates played each other in Pittsburgh. Both teams wore throwback uniforms similar to those worn in 1909. The stadium's public address and sound systems were also turned off, simulating the game conditions in 1909. The Pirates won the game, 6–3.

=== The "Krauthead" story ===
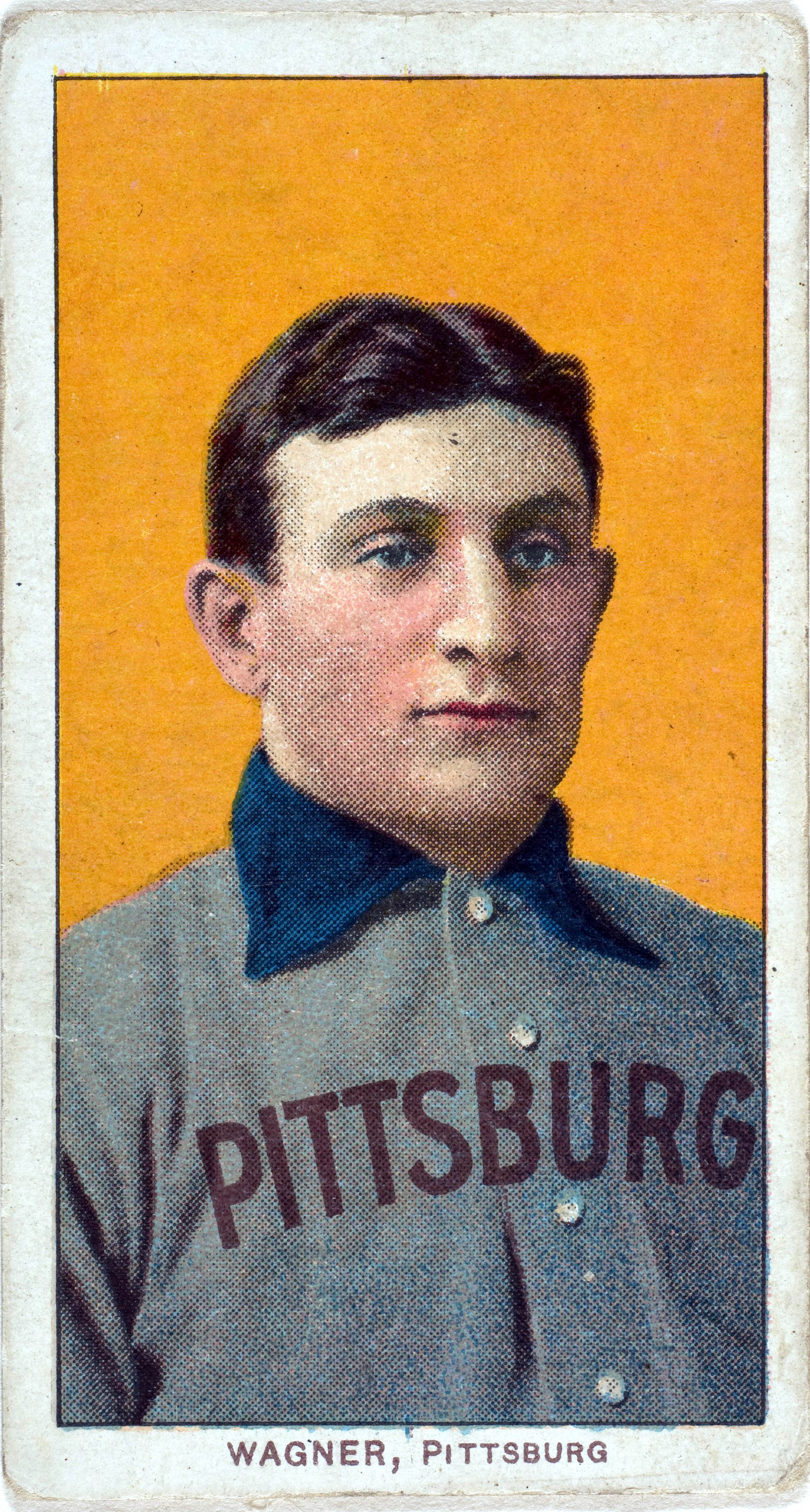
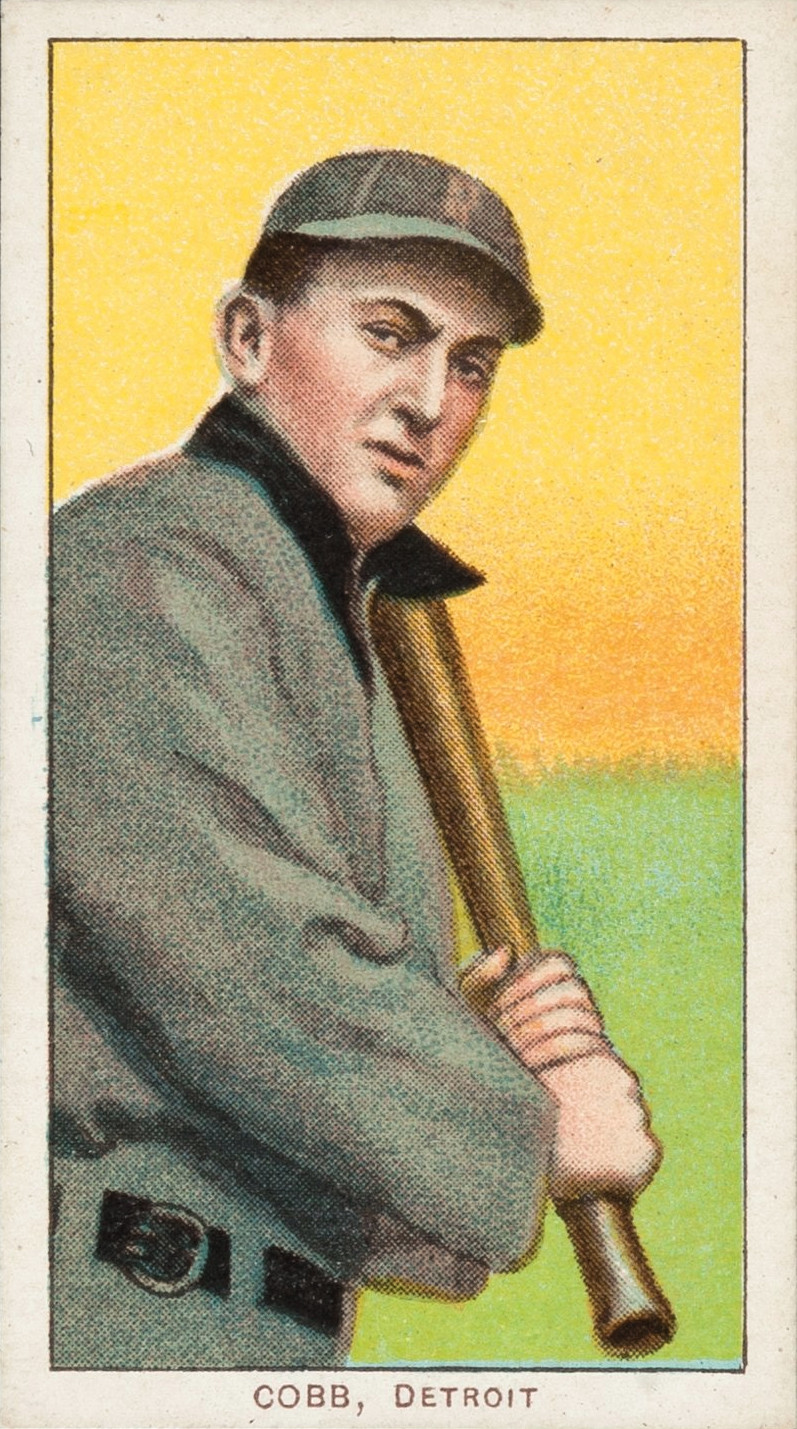
Honus Wagner and Ty Cobb displayed on T206 baseball cards

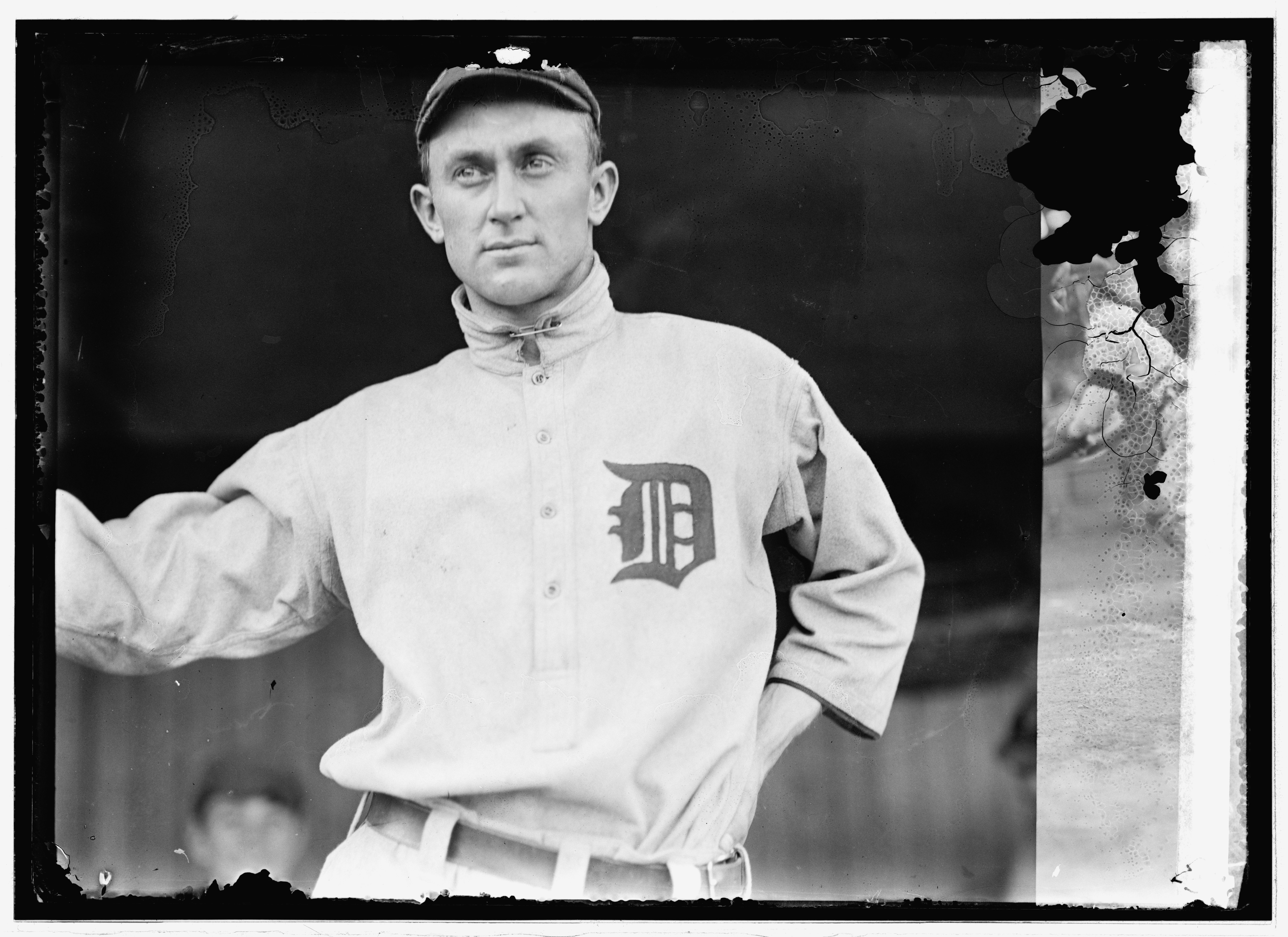
Ty Cobb in 1913

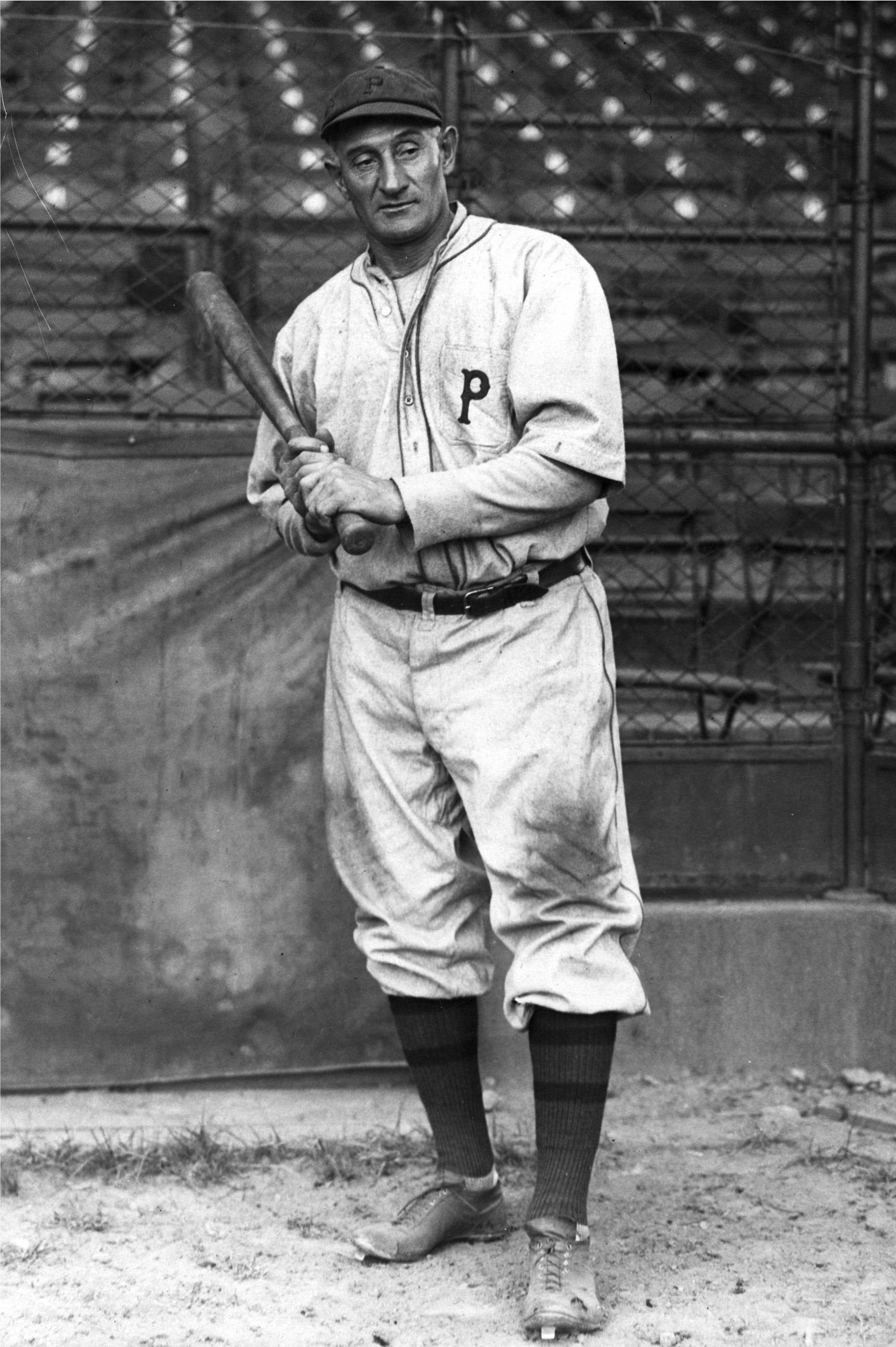
Honus Wagner

Ty Cobb had a fairly quiet Series, going 6-for-26 with two stolen bases and one caught stealing. There is a long-standing legend that Cobb, standing on first base, called the German-ancestored Honus Wagner a "krauthead", told him he was going to steal second, and was not only thrown out but that Wagner tagged him in the mouth, ball in hand, drawing blood from Cobb's lip. However, an examination of the play-by-play does not indicate that such a play occurred. In the one "caught stealing" charged to Cobb, during the first inning of Game 4, he was actually safe at second due to a throwing error by first baseman Bill Abstein. This story is largely attributed to the creative press at the time, and Wagner and Cobb were actually on good terms.

== Summary ==
NL Pittsburgh Pirates (4) vs. AL Detroit Tigers (3)

Game	Date	Score	Location	Time	Attendance
1	October 8	Detroit Tigers – 1, Pittsburgh Pirates – 4	Forbes Field	1:55	29,264
2	October 9	Detroit Tigers – 7, Pittsburgh Pirates – 2	Forbes Field	1:45	30,915
3	October 11	Pittsburgh Pirates – 8, Detroit Tigers – 6	Bennett Park	1:56	18,277
4	October 12	Pittsburgh Pirates – 0, Detroit Tigers – 5	Bennett Park	1:57	17,036
5	October 13	Detroit Tigers – 4, Pittsburgh Pirates – 8	Forbes Field	1:46	21,706
6	October 14	Pittsburgh Pirates – 4, Detroit Tigers – 5	Bennett Park	2:00	10,535
7	October 16	Pittsburgh Pirates – 8, Detroit Tigers – 0	Bennett Park	2:10	17,562

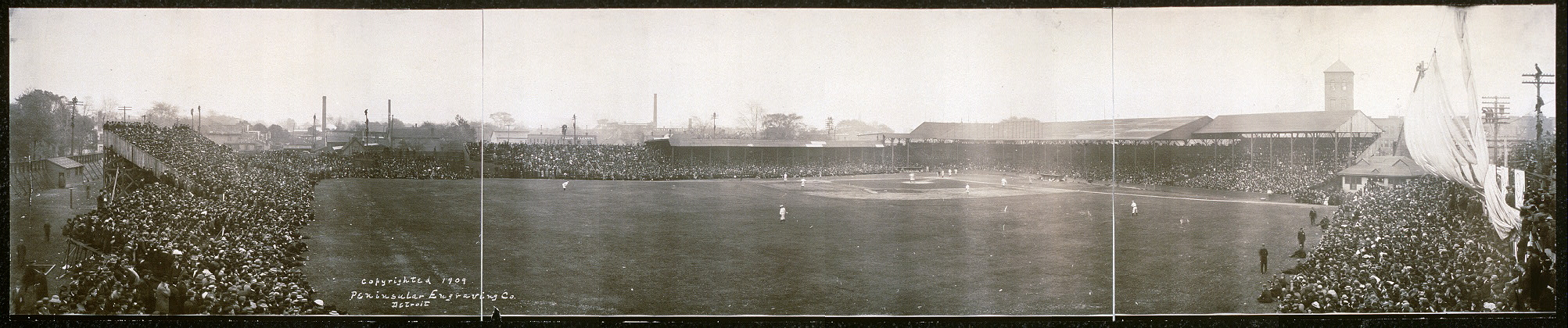
Bennett Park on October 11, 1909, for the third game of the 1909 World Series.

== Matchups ==
=== Game 1 ===
Friday, October 8, 1909 2:00 pm (ET) at Forbes Field in Pittsburgh, Pennsylvania
Team	1	2	3	4	5	6	7	8	9	R	H	E
Detroit	1	0	0	0	0	0	0	0	0	1	6	4
Pittsburgh	0	0	0	1	2	1	0	0	X	4	5	0
WP: Babe Adams (1–0) LP: George Mullin (0–1); Home runs: DET: None; PIT: Fred Clarke (1)

I'll never forget the look on Adams' face when I told him I wanted him to pitch the opener.

— Pirates manager Fred Clarke

Rookie Babe Adams, who had compiled a 12–3 record during the regular season, unexpectedly drew the start for Game 1. He responded with a six-hit, 4–1 victory sparked by Clarke's game-tying home run in the bottom of the fourth inning.

=== Game 2 ===
Saturday, October 9, 1909 2:00 pm (ET) at Forbes Field in Pittsburgh, Pennsylvania
Team	1	2	3	4	5	6	7	8	9	R	H	E
Detroit	0	2	3	0	2	0	0	0	0	7	9	2
Pittsburgh	2	0	0	0	0	0	0	0	0	2	5	1
WP: Wild Bill Donovan (1–0) LP: Howie Camnitz (0–1)

The Tigers began their 7–2 comeback win (after a two-run Pirate bottom of the first) with three runs in the top of the third, tying the Series at one game apiece. Ty Cobb stole home to start the rally.

=== Game 3 ===
Monday, October 11, 1909 2:00 pm (ET) at Bennett Park in Detroit, Michigan
Team	1	2	3	4	5	6	7	8	9	R	H	E
Pittsburgh	5	1	0	0	0	0	0	0	2	8	10	2
Detroit	0	0	0	0	0	0	4	0	2	6	11	5
WP: Nick Maddox (1–0) LP: Ed Summers (0–1)

Honus Wagner had three hits, three RBI and three stolen bases as the Pirates regained the lead in the Series, two games to one.

=== Game 4 ===
Tuesday, October 12, 1909 2:00 pm (ET) at Bennett Park in Detroit, Michigan
Team	1	2	3	4	5	6	7	8	9	R	H	E
Pittsburgh	0	0	0	0	0	0	0	0	0	0	5	6
Detroit	0	2	0	3	0	0	0	0	X	5	8	0
WP: George Mullin (1–1) LP: Lefty Leifield (0–1)

The win-swapping continued with Detroit taking Game 4. Tiger ace George Mullin threw a five-hit shutout while striking out 10 Pirates, again evening the Series at two games apiece.

=== Game 5 ===
Wednesday, October 13, 1909 2:00 pm (ET) at Forbes Field in Pittsburgh, Pennsylvania
Team	1	2	3	4	5	6	7	8	9	R	H	E
Detroit	1	0	0	0	0	2	0	1	0	4	6	1
Pittsburgh	1	1	1	0	0	0	4	1	X	8	10	2
WP: Babe Adams (2–0) LP: Ed Summers (0–2); Home runs: DET: Davy Jones (1), Sam Crawford (1); PIT: Fred Clarke (2)

Babe Adams threw another six-hitter, for an 8–4 triumph and a 3–2 Series lead for his Pirates.

=== Game 6 ===
Thursday, October 14, 1909 2:00 pm (ET) at Bennett Park in Detroit, Michigan
Team	1	2	3	4	5	6	7	8	9	R	H	E
Pittsburgh	3	0	0	0	0	0	0	0	1	4	8	1
Detroit	1	0	0	2	1	1	0	0	X	5	10	2
WP: George Mullin (2–1) LP: Vic Willis (0–1)

Mullin, after being roughed up for three first-inning runs, surrendered only one more and wound up with the win, knotting the Series at three games apiece.

=== Game 7 ===
Saturday, October 16, 1909 2:00 pm (ET) at Bennett Park in Detroit, Michigan
Team	1	2	3	4	5	6	7	8	9	R	H	E
Pittsburgh	0	2	0	2	0	3	0	1	0	8	7	0
Detroit	0	0	0	0	0	0	0	0	0	0	6	3
WP: Babe Adams (3–0) LP: Wild Bill Donovan (1–1)

With the Series coming down to a climactic seventh game (the first to go the distance), Pittsburgh's Fred Clarke went with two-game winner Babe Adams as his pitcher, while Detroit Manager Hugh Jennings decided on Bill Donovan, a complete-game winner in Game 2.

Donovan got off to a miserable start. He hit the first Pirate batter and went on to walk six in the first two innings. He was pulled after three with Adams confidently holding a 2–0 lead. Pittsburgh never looked back, as Babe nailed his third six-hitter and third win of the Series for an 8–0 championship victory.

Honus Wagner continued to prove his Cooperstown worthiness by hitting .333, with seven RBI and six stolen bases (the latter total standing as a Series record until Lou Brock surpassed it in 1967). On the other side, Ty Cobb did not fare as well. Appearing in what would be his last Series (although he would remain active through 1928), Cobb batted only .231 although he did lead the Tigers, losers of their third Series in three years, with six RBI.

It was the first time that one team won the odd-numbered games; the other, the even; it did not happen again until 1962.

== Composite line score ==
1909 World Series (4–3): Pittsburgh Pirates (N.L.) beat Detroit Tigers (A.L.)

Team	1	2	3	4	5	6	7	8	9	R	H	E
Pittsburgh Pirates	11	4	1	3	2	4	4	2	3	34	50	12
Detroit Tigers	3	4	3	5	3	3	4	1	2	28	56	17
Total attendance: 145,295 Average attendance: 20,756; Winning player's share: $1,825 Losing player's share: $1,275

== Film coverage ==
The championship was recorded by Essanay Co., and sold double the expected number of copies. Studio manager A. M. Kennedy speculated that the film would set a world record for sales.

== Aftermath ==
No two professional sports teams from Detroit and Pittsburgh would play for a major professional sports championship again until the 2008 Stanley Cup Final between the Detroit Red Wings and Pittsburgh Penguins.

The Pirates would return to the World Series in 1925, where they overcame a 3–1 series deficit and defeated the Washington Senators in seven games.

This was the third straight World Series loss for the Tigers. The Tigers would not play in another Fall Classic for 25 years, where they lost yet again in seven games, this time to the St. Louis Cardinals.
