= Bill Klem =

American baseball umpire (1874-1951)

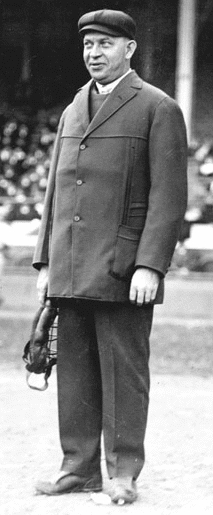
- Klem in 1914
- Born: February 22, 1874; Rochester, New York, U.S.
- Died: September 16, 1951 (aged 77); Miami, Florida, U.S.
- Occupation: National League Umpire
- Years active: 1905–1941
- Spouse: Marie Kranz (m. 1910)
- Baseball career

Member of the National

Baseball Hall of Fame
- Induction: 1953
- Election method: Veterans Committee

William Joseph Klem (born Klimm; February 22, 1874 – September 16, 1951), known as "the Old Arbitrator", was an American baseball umpire who worked in Major League Baseball from 1905 to 1941, spending his entire career in the National League (NL). He worked 18 World Series, which is a major league record. Klem retired after 37 seasons as an umpire and spent ten years in retirement before dying in 1951 at the age of 77. After his death, Klem was posthumously inducted into the Baseball Hall of Fame in 1953 and was notably one of the first two umpires ever inducted to the Baseball Hall of Fame alongside Tom Connolly.

== Biography ==
=== Early life ===
Klem was born on February 22, 1874, in the "Dutchtown" area of Rochester, New York. He had changed the spelling of his last name from "Klimm" to "Klem" because he thought it had a better sound. Klem pursued a professional baseball career as a catcher until he suffered a career ending arm injury. He then worked as a bartender and traveled through the Northeast building bridges. He decided to pursue umpiring after reading a newspaper article about major league umpire Silk O'Loughlin.

His umpiring career began in the Connecticut League in 1902. That year, Klem had a run-in with league secretary and team manager Jim O'Rourke after Klem ejected one of the manager's players. O'Rourke threatened that Klem would not umpire another game in the league, but Klem responded, "Maybe so, but I'll umpire this one."

He worked in the New York State League the following year. Klem spent the 1904 season in the American Association before joining the NL in 1905.

=== MLB career ===
He worked a record 18 World Series: 1908, 1909, 1911, 1912, 1913, 1914, 1915, 1917, 1918, 1920, 1922, 1924, 1926, 1929, 1931, 1932, 1934 and 1940. No other umpire has worked in more than ten Series. Of the 16 major league teams in existence during his career, all but one—the St. Louis Browns, who would not win a pennant until 1944—appeared in a World Series that he officiated; the only other teams which did not win a championship with Klem on the field were the Brooklyn Dodgers, Philadelphia Phillies (neither of which won a title during Klem's lifetime) and the Detroit Tigers. He was also one of the umpires for the first All-Star Game in 1933, and worked behind the plate for the second half of the game; he later umpired in the 1938 All-Star Game as well.

Klem holds the MLB record for most career ejections by an umpire with 279.

He called balls and strikes in five no-hitters, an NL record later tied by Harry Wendelstedt. He was also the home plate umpire on September 16, 1924, when Jim Bottomley of the St. Louis Cardinals had a record 12 runs batted in. Klem had a number of nicknames amongst the players: his favorite was "the Old Arbitrator", but his jowly appearance also led to some players calling him "Catfish". Klem despised the latter name, and was notorious for ejecting players whom he caught using it. One particular incident involved a player whom Klem ejected after he caught the player drawing a picture of a catfish with his foot in the infield dirt.

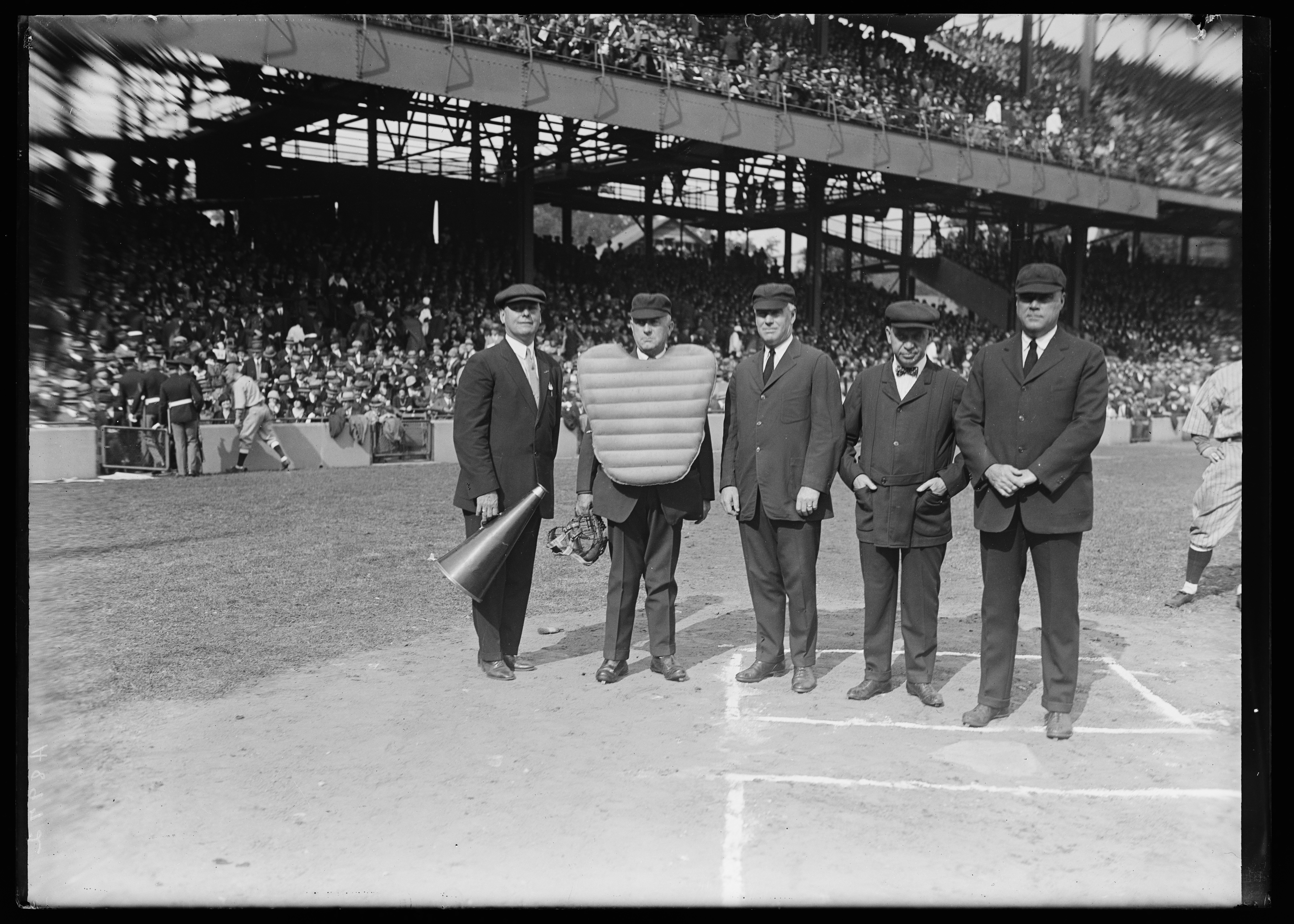
Umpires for the World Series of 1924 lined up before the game with George Phillips, left, official announcer. Right to Left: Umpires Bill Dinneen, Bill Klem, Ernest C. Quigley, Tom Connolly, and Phillips.

Klem also dismissed catcher Al López from a game after López pasted a newspaper clipping onto home plate which showed Klem clearly in error calling a play involving López. The catcher had covered the photo with dirt and waited for Klem to brush off home plate.

As Klem got older, he began to experience a skin condition that he said related to his nerves. He once commented on the toll that umpiring took on him, saying, "Most baseball fans... feel that these verbal and physical public humiliations [umpires endure] go in one ear and out the other. Well, they don't. They go in one ear and go straight to the nervous system, eating away coordination, self-confidence and self-respect." Late in his life, Klem stated in interviews that he had originated the use of hand signals for umpiring calls. It was difficult to challenge Klem at the time because so many years had passed. Recent research does not yield a clear answer to the origin of hand signals, with credit often going to umpire Cy Rigler.

By 1940, Klem had retired and had been replaced by future Hall of Fame umpire Al Barlick. At that time, Klem was appointed the NL's chief of umpires. The league began experimenting with four-man umpire crews in 1941 and Klem appeared in a few games that season so that those games would have four umpires. Klem held the record for most MLB games umpired for over 70 years – at his retirement in 1941, he had umpired 5,375 games, the record until 2021 when it was surpassed by Joe West. He finished his career having umpired 5,375 regular season MLB games (all in the National League), 103 postseason games (all in World Series), and two MLB All-Star Games.

He had the longest career of any major league umpire (37 years) before Bruce Froemming tied that mark in 2007, and was also the oldest umpire in history at age 67 until Froemming surpassed that mark as well. Klem was widely respected for bringing dignity and professionalism to umpiring, as well as for his high skill and good judgment. Klem was also an innovative umpire: he was one of the first to wear a modern, somewhat pliable chest protector inside his shirt, a move which he successfully campaigned to have adopted throughout the NL, although Jocko Conlan and Beans Reardon used the outside protector. He was the first to straddle foul lines and stand to the catcher's side for better perspective. Finally, he was the last umpire to work the plate exclusively (traditionally the crew chief always worked the plate; today umpire crews rotate base/plate assignments).

=== Personal life ===
Klem's wife was named Marie. She often traveled with him to games that he worked. They had no children.

=== Death and legacy ===
Klem died on September 16, 1951, at age 77, at Doctors Hospital in Coral Gables, Florida. He died of a heart attack after suffering from heart problems for two to three years. He had been hospitalized for over a month when he died. About a week before his death, Klem seemed to know that his death was coming, commenting to his attorney, "This is my last game and I'm going to strike out this time." His wife was his only survivor.

Klem and Tom Connolly were the first two umpires inducted into the Baseball Hall of Fame in 1953. They are also the only umpires to have worked in five different decades. In 1946 Klem and Connolly had also been named to the Honor Rolls of Baseball.

In 1962, the Houston chapter of the Baseball Writers' Association of America established the Bill Klem Award to honor outstanding NL umpires.

== See also ==
- List of Major League Baseball umpires (disambiguation)
- Major League Baseball umpiring records
