= Jocko Conlan =

American baseball umpire (1899–1989)

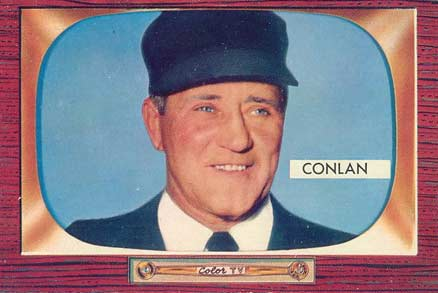
- Born: December 6, 1899; Chicago, Illinois, U.S.
- Died: April 16, 1989 (aged 89); Scottsdale, Arizona, U.S.
- Years active: 1941–1965
- Spouse: Ruth Anderson (m. 1941)
- Children: 2, including John Bertrand Conlan, Nona Conlan
- Baseball career
- Outfielder / Umpire
- Batted: Left Threw: Left

MLB debut
- July 6, 1934, for the Chicago White Sox

Last MLB appearance
- September 29, 1935, for the Chicago White Sox

MLB statistics
- Batting average: .263
- Runs batted in: 31
- Stolen bases: 5
- Stats at Baseball Reference

Teams
- Chicago White Sox (1934–1935)

Career highlights and awards
- National League Umpire (1941–1965); World Series (1945, 1950, 1954, 1957 and 1961)

Member of the National

Baseball Hall of Fame
- Induction: 1974
- Election method: Veterans Committee

John Bertrand "Jocko" Conlan (December 6, 1899 – April 16, 1989) was an American baseball umpire who worked in the National League (NL) from 1941 to 1965. He had a brief career as an outfielder with the Chicago White Sox before entering umpiring. He umpired in five World Series and six All-Star Games. He was elected to the Baseball Hall of Fame in 1974 by the Veterans Committee.

== Early life ==
Conlan was born in Chicago. He was one of nine children. Conlan's father, a Chicago police officer, died when Conlan was three years old. He attended De La Salle Institute in Chicago.

== Playing career ==
Beginning his professional baseball career in 1920, Conlan spent 13 years as a minor league player. Statistics are incomplete, but Conlan was known to have played with Western League teams in Wichita until 1923. He was in the International League for the next several seasons, playing for the Rochester Tribe from 1924 to 1926 and for the Newark Bears from 1927 to 1929. He spent a season with the Toledo Mud Hens of the American Association and then returned to the International League with the Montreal Royals in 1931 and 1932.

Conlan began his major league career in 1934 as a center fielder for the Chicago White Sox. In 1935, however, Conlan was presented with an unusual opportunity. During a game against the St. Louis Browns, umpire Red Ormsby fell ill due to the heat. In those days, only two umpires covered typical regular-season games, and a player with a reputation for honesty might be pressed into service if one umpire became incapacitated. Conlan was asked to fill in, and took to it well. The following year Conlan made the transition from player to umpire complete, beginning in the minor leagues.

== Umpiring career ==
Conlan umpired in the National League from 1941 to 1965, officiating in five World Series (1945, 1950, 1954, 1957 and 1961) and six All-Star Games (1943, 1947, 1950, 1953, 1958 and the first 1962 contest). He also umpired in the playoff series to decide the NL's regular-season champions in 1951, 1959 and 1962 (some sources erroneously credit him with umpiring in the 1946 NL playoff as well). He was the home plate umpire when Gil Hodges hit four home runs on August 31, 1950; he also umpired in the April 30, 1961 game in which Willie Mays hit four home runs. He retired after the 1964 season, but returned to work as a substitute umpire for 17 games in 1965.

Conlan was known for several trademarks: Instead of a regular dress tie like most umpires of the day wore, Conlan wore a natty bow tie for his career. Conlan further distinguished himself by making "out" calls with his left hand instead of his right. He was also the last NL umpire allowed to wear the outside chest protector, instead of the inside protector that all other NL umpires except Beans Reardon were using by then.

Manager Casey Stengel said that he admired Conlan's performance both as a player and as an umpire. He managed Conlan with the Toledo Mud Hens and described a time when Conlan broke his leg sliding into third base. He scored a run before telling anyone that he had been hurt. Though he was hitting .292 when he got hurt, Stengel gave him half of a $1,000 bonus he was supposed to get for batting .300. Stengel later said, "And as a reward for the $500 bonus I once gave him, he used to chase me oftener than anyone than any other manager in the league. But I admired him for his courage as a player and an official."

== Argument with Leo Durocher ==
Jocko Conlan and manager Leo Durocher were both known as colorful characters, and sometimes they would clash. Durocher liked to tell of one unique incident in a game at the Los Angeles Memorial Coliseum (April 16, 1961) when he was arguing with Conlan after he had already been ejected from the game. He attempted to kick dirt on Conlan's shoes, but slipped and actually kicked Conlan in the shins. Striking an umpire is a serious offense, but Conlan "kicked him right back," a sequence that an alert photographer also captured and which was circulated for some time. As Conlan was wearing shin guards, he was not injured by Durocher's kicks.

== Popular culture ==
Conlan's name was mentioned several times in a fictitious baseball game celebrated in the 1962 song "The Los Angeles Dodgers," recorded by Danny Kaye. The song referred to Conlan only by his last name, with the presumption that the listener would know he was referring to the famous umpire. That song is contained on the CD Baseball's Greatest Hits.

The book Carl Erskine's Tales from the Dodgers Dugout: Extra Innings (2004) includes short stories from former Dodger pitcher Carl Erskine. Conlan is prominent in many of these stories.

== Later life ==
Conlan retired to Arizona, where he enjoyed playing golf.

Upon Conlan's retirement, NL president Warren Giles said, "I know of no one who has been more dedicated to his profession, more loyal to the game in which he has been such a big party, and I hate to see him hang up his spikes."

Conlan was elected to the Baseball Hall of Fame by the Committee on Baseball Veterans in 1974. He was the fourth umpire chosen, and the first NL umpire since Bill Klem in 1953.

He was never issued an umpire number, having officiated before this occurred.

Conlan underwent heart surgery after becoming ill while watching the first game of the 1974 World Series. He died on April 16th, 1989 at a hospital in Scottsdale, Arizona. Jocko Conlan was 89 years old.

His son John Bertrand Conlan served as a U.S. representative from Arizona from 1973 to 1977.

== See also ==
- List of Major League Baseball umpires (disambiguation)
