= Bill Summers (umpire) =

American baseball umpire (1895-1966)

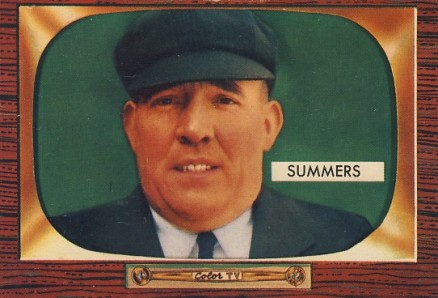
Bill Summers' 1955 baseball card

William Reed Summers (November 10, 1895 – September 12, 1966) was an American umpire in Major League Baseball who worked in the American League from 1933 to 1959.

== Early life ==
Summers was born in Harrison, New Jersey, and raised in Woonsocket, Rhode Island. He left school in the seventh grade, and began working under his father, a mill foreman; he also began boxing as a lightweight, with moderate success in the ring. At age 17, he was employed as a road worker when he stopped to watch a high school baseball game. The umpire who was supposed to officiate never arrived, however, and Summers was asked by Woonsocket high school coach Frank Keaney – who would go on to an extraordinary collegiate coaching career – to fill in. Summers accepted, even though he had never played baseball and was unfamiliar with the rules; Keaney told him that as long as he kept track of balls and strikes, it shouldn't prove difficult. Summers proved adept at the task, and regularly officiated high school, semi-pro and industrial games for the next eight years.

== Umpiring career ==
In 1921 he got his first chance at the professional ranks when he was hired by the Eastern League, and he continued in the minor leagues through 1932. He joined the American League staff in 1933, during the period when the major leagues were expanding standard umpiring crews from two men per game to three. Over his career, the firmly authoritative Summers proved adept at handling arguments, using his stocky build (5'8" and 208 pounds (94 kg)) to maximum advantage in defusing potentially explosive situations; he had a "slow thumb", rarely ejecting anyone from a game without a warning.

Summers umpired in 8 World Series (1936, 1939, 1942, 1945, 1948, 1951, 1955 and 1959), tying the American League record shared by three other arbiters. He was also the first base umpire for the 1948 playoff game that decided the American League pennant, and worked in 7 All-Star Games, setting a record (later tied by Al Barlick): 1936, 1941, 1946, 1949, 1952, 1955 and 1959 (second game). He called balls and strikes in all 7 of the All-Star contests, a mark unmatched by any other umpire. He was the home plate umpire on July 27, 1946, when Rudy York hit two grand slams, and on June 10, 1959, when Rocky Colavito hit four home runs.

Summers was the home plate umpire in Game 1 of the 1955 World Series when Jackie Robinson stole home in the 8th inning, prompting Yankee catcher Yogi Berra to furiously argue his safe call.

Late in his career, during his long tenure on baseball's Rules Committee, that body completed a major overhaul of the rule book, revising it entirely into a greatly improved version which organized the rules by logical subsections. In 1955, Summers became the major leagues' senior umpire in service time; he retired following the 1959 World Series, at age 63 the oldest umpire ever to serve on the American League staff, and later gave clinics and lectures at military bases throughout the world.

== Personal life ==
Summers married Mary Ellen Van Riper on April 30, 1917. He died on September 12, 1966, at age 70 at his home in Upton, Massachusetts.

== Quote ==
- "I wasn't much of an umpire, at first; but I could keep the peace. And that's an umpire's most important and toughest job."

== See also ==
- List of Major League Baseball umpires (disambiguation)
