= 1932 World Series =

1932 Major League Baseball championship series

Team (Wins)	Managers	Season
New York Yankees (4)	Joe McCarthy	107–47, .695, GA: 13
Chicago Cubs (0)	Charlie Grimm	90–64, .584, GA: 4
- Dates: September 28 – October 2
- Venue(s): Yankee Stadium (New York); Wrigley Field (Chicago)
- Umpires: Bill Dinneen (AL), Bill Klem (NL), Roy Van Graflan (AL), George Magerkurth (NL)
- Hall of Famers: Umpire: Bill Klem; Yankees: Joe McCarthy (mgr.); Earle Combs; Bill Dickey; Lou Gehrig; Lefty Gomez; Tony Lazzeri; Herb Pennock; Red Ruffing; Babe Ruth; Joe Sewell; Cubs: Rogers Hornsby‡ (mgr.); Kiki Cuyler; Billy Herman; Burleigh Grimes; Gabby Hartnett ‡ Elected as a player

Broadcast
- Radio: NBC; CBS
- Radio announcers: NBC: Hal Totten; Tom Manning; Graham McNamee; CBS: Bob Elson; Pat Flanagan; Ted Husing

The 1932 World Series was the championship series in Major League Baseball for the 1932 season. The 29th edition of the World Series, it matched the American League (AL) champion New York Yankees versus the National League (NL) champions Chicago Cubs. The Yankees won in a four-game sweep. By far it is mostly noteworthy for Babe Ruth's "called shot" home run, in his 10th and last World Series. It was punctuated by fiery arguments between the two teams, heating up the atmosphere before the World Series even began. A record 13 future Hall of Famers played in this World Series, with three other future Hall of Famers also participating: umpire Bill Klem, Yankees manager Joe McCarthy, and Cubs manager Rogers Hornsby. It was also the first World Series in which both teams wore uniforms with numbers on the backs of the shirts.

== Summary ==
AL New York Yankees (4) vs. NL Chicago Cubs (0)

Game	Date	Score	Location	Time	Attendance
1	September 28	Chicago Cubs 6, New York Yankees 12	Yankee Stadium	2:31	41,459
2	September 29	Chicago Cubs 2, New York Yankees 5	Yankee Stadium	1:46	50,709
3	October 1	New York Yankees 7, Chicago Cubs 5	Wrigley Field	2:11	49,986
4	October 2	New York Yankees 13, Chicago Cubs 6	Wrigley Field	2:27	49,844

== Matchups ==
=== Game 1 ===
September 28, 1932 1:30 pm (ET) at Yankee Stadium in Bronx, New York
Team	1	2	3	4	5	6	7	8	9	R	H	E
Chicago	2	0	0	0	0	0	2	2	0	6	10	1
New York	0	0	0	3	0	5	3	1	X	12	8	2
WP: Red Ruffing (1–0) LP: Guy Bush (0–1); Home runs: CHC: None; NYY: Lou Gehrig (1)

The Cubs opened the scoring with two runs in the top of the first inning with three singles, two by Woody English and Riggs Stephenson scoring a run each, but in the bottom of the third inning Earle Combs drew a leadoff walk off Guy Bush, moved to second on a groundout, and scored on Babe Ruth's single before a two-run home run by Lou Gehrig put the Yankees up 3–2. In the sixth inning, they loaded the bases on three walks with one out before a two-run single by Bill Dickey and RBI fielder's choice by Ben Chapman knocked Bush out of the game. Burleigh Grimes in relief allowed two-out two-run single to Combs. The Cubs scored two in the seventh on Stephenson's two-run single, but in the bottom half, after a walk and single, Tony Lazzeri's RBI single, Chapman's sacrifice fly, and Grimes's wild pitch put the Yankees up 11–4. In the eighth, Gabby Hartnett hit a leadoff double and scored on Mark Koenig's triple. Billy Herman's groundout scored the Cubs' last run. The Yankees got one more run in the bottom half off Bob Smith when Combs doubled and scored on Joe Sewell's single. Yankee starter Red Ruffing pitched a complete game, striking out 10 Cubs but walking six and giving up six runs, only three of which were earned.

=== Game 2 ===
September 29, 1932 1:30 pm (ET) at Yankee Stadium in Bronx, New York
Team	1	2	3	4	5	6	7	8	9	R	H	E
Chicago	1	0	1	0	0	0	0	0	0	2	9	0
New York	2	0	2	0	1	0	0	0	X	5	10	1
WP: Lefty Gomez (1–0) LP: Lon Warneke (0–1)

In Game 2, Chicago scored first in the top of the first on Riggs Stephenson's sacrifice fly with runners on first and third off Lefty Gomez, but in the bottom half, after two leadoff walks, RBI singles by Lou Gehrig and Bill Dickey off Lon Warneke put the Yankees up 2–1. The Cubs tied the game in the third when Stephenson doubled with two outs and scored on Frank Demaree's single, but in the bottom half, Ben Chapman's two-run bases-loaded single put the Yankees ahead 4–2. They added another run in the fifth when Lou Gehrig hit a leadoff single, moved to second on a groundout and scored on Bill Dickey's single. Both pitchers pitched a complete game. This was the last World Series game Babe Ruth ever played in Yankee Stadium, with a single in his last Fall Classic home at-bat.

=== Game 3 ===
Ruth is congratulated by Gehrig after hitting his "called shot." Gabby Hartnett, the Cubs catcher, watches.

October 1, 1932 1:30 pm (CT) at Wrigley Field in Chicago, Illinois
Team	1	2	3	4	5	6	7	8	9	R	H	E
New York	3	0	1	0	2	0	0	0	1	7	8	1
Chicago	1	0	2	1	0	0	0	0	1	5	9	4
WP: George Pipgras (1–0) LP: Charlie Root (0–1) Sv: Herb Pennock (1); Home runs: NYY: Babe Ruth 2 (2), Lou Gehrig 2 (3); CHC: Kiki Cuyler (1), Gabby Hartnett (1)

Roughly 50,000 Cubs fans showed up for Game 3, a very large crowd for the time made possible by the construction of temporary bleachers fronting Waveland and Sheffield Avenues. In a prelude of things to come, Ruth and Gehrig put on an impressive batting display in batting practice. Ruth launched nine balls into the outfield stands, while Gehrig hit seven. As reported in the first edition of A Day at the Park, by William Hartel, p. 82, Ruth said while batting: "I'd play for half my salary if I could bat in this dump all the time!"

Cub starter Charlie Root struggled in the opening frame. The first two Yankees reached base on a walk and error, and Babe Ruth followed with a home run into the right-center-field bleachers to put the Yanks up 3–0. The existing newsreel footage showed Gehrig giving Ruth a friendly swat on the buttocks as Ruth crossed the plate. Before their part of the first inning was over, the Yankees got two, two-out singles, but they failed to score any further runs in the inning. In the bottom half, Billy Herman drew a leadoff walk off George Pipgras and scored on Kiki Cuyler's double.

Gehrig hit a home run in the top of the third to put the Yankees up 4–1. In the bottom half, Cuyler homered with one out, then after a single and forceout, Grimm's RBI double cut the Yankees lead to 4–3. Next inning, Billy Jurges doubled to left after Ruth's futile dive for the ball and scored on an error to tie the game.

In the top of the fifth, Ruth came up to bat and, after making a series of pointing gestures, eventually hit a home run to centerfield, giving the Yankees the lead and control of the rest of the World Series. The home run, deemed Babe Ruth's called shot, has since become arguably the most iconic home run in baseball history. Many believe Ruth's pointing gestures to have been his declaring he would hit a home run to a specific point in the stands, although evidence has suggested that he was actually pointing his finger tauntingly at the Cubs' dugout.

Root would only throw one more pitch, which Gehrig hit for a back-to-back home run, putting the Yankees up 6–4 and knocking Root out of the game. The Yankees got another run in the ninth aided by two errors on Champman's double off Jakie May. Though Gabby Hartnett hit a leadoff home run in the bottom half and Billy Jurges singled off Pipgras, Herb Pennock retired the next three batters to end the game and leave the Yankees one win away from the championship.

=== Game 4 ===
October 2, 1932 1:30 pm (CT) at Wrigley Field in Chicago, Illinois
Team	1	2	3	4	5	6	7	8	9	R	H	E
New York	1	0	2	0	0	2	4	0	4	13	19	4
Chicago	4	0	0	0	0	1	0	0	1	6	9	1
WP: Wilcy Moore (1–0) LP: Jakie May (0–1) Sv: Herb Pennock (2); Home runs: NYY: Tony Lazzeri 2 (2), Earle Combs (1); CHC: Frank Demaree (1)

The Yankees loaded the bases in the top of the first on two singles and a hit-by-pitch, but scored just once on Lou Gehrig's sacrifice fly. A walk loaded the bases, but Lon Warneke in relief of Guy Bush retired the next two batters to end the inning. In the bottom half, after two singles, Frank Demaree's three-run home run off Johnny Allen put the Cubs atop 3–1. After an error and single, Billy Jurges's RBI single knocked Allen out of the game. Wilcy Moore relieved him and put the fire out, giving up only one additional run in 5 1/3 innings. Tony Lazzeri's two-out two-run home run in the third cut the Cubs' lead to 4–3. The Yankees took the lead in the sixth on a two-run single by Gehrig off Jakie May, but in the bottom half, two errors allowed the Cubs to tie the game. In the seventh, after loading the bases, three straight hits by Earle Combs, Joe Sewell and the Babe, the last World Series hits for Sewell and Ruth, put the Yankees up for good, 9–5. A hit-by-pitch reloaded the bases, but Bud Tinning retired two to end the inning. The Yankees blew the game open in the ninth off Burleigh Grimes, starting with a leadoff home run by Earle Combs, then after two outs, Gehrig walked before Lazzeri's second home run of the game made it 12–5 Yankees. They scored one more run when Bill Dickey singled and scored on Ben Chapman's double. In the bottom half, Herb Pennock allowed a leadoff single to Billy Herman who stole second and third on defensive indifferences and scored on Woody English's groundout before Pennock retired the next two hitters to end the series.

The Yankees had won their fourth World Series, and their 12th consecutive Series game. It was the last Series for Yankee mainstays Ruth, Combs and Pennock.

The Cubs extended their World Series victory drought to 24 years with their humiliating loss, their fourth consecutive in the Fall Classic after 1910, 1918 and 1929 (to the A's, Red Sox and A's again respectively). The Cubs' drought would end up lasting 108 years, having been finally ended when the Cubs defeated the Cleveland Indians in seven games to win the 2016 World Series.

Despite Ruth's heroics, Gehrig was the real hero of the series batting .529 (he collected 9 hits out of 17 times at bat) with 8 RBIs and 3 home runs.

== Composite line score ==
1932 World Series (4–0): New York Yankees (A.L.) over Chicago Cubs (N.L.)

Team	1	2	3	4	5	6	7	8	9	R	H	E
New York Yankees	6	0	5	3	3	7	7	1	5	37	45	8
Chicago Cubs	8	0	3	1	0	1	2	2	2	19	37	6
Total attendance: 191,998 Average attendance: 48,000; Winning player's share: $5,232 Losing player's share: $4,245

== The arguments ==
Bench jockeying, called "trash talk" nowadays, was standard procedure in baseball then as now. No verbal punches were ever pulled, but the jockeying was supposedly taken to new heights (or depths) in this Series stemming from Yankee disrespect for the way the Cubs treated their former teammate, shortstop Mark Koenig, after his acquisition from the Detroit Tigers' Triple-A Mission Reds of the Pacific Coast League on April 25, 1932. Despite Koenig's regular-season contributions (hitting .353 and fielding well), his stingy Cub teammates voted him only half a player's postseason share before the start of the Series because he had only played in 33 games and was unable to play in the Series due to injury. When some of Koenig's Yankee friends got wind of this, they dissed the Cubs as "cheapskates" in the press, "tight" with their Series money.

Ruth infuriated the Cubs the most when he called them cheapskates. Adding spice to the verbal stew was that Yankee manager Joe McCarthy had been fired by the Cubs a year or two after leading them to the 1929 NL pennant. When the Series started in New York, the Cubs retaliated by calling the Babe "fat" and "washed up" along with every obscenity they could think of. Guy Bush, Cub starter in Game 1, led the verbal attack on Ruth, calling him "nigger" (a common bench-jockey slam against the Babe for his broad nose and thick lips despite his German origin), and banter like this went on for most of the Series.

== The "called shot" ==
Babe Ruth's called shot refers to the home run he hit in the fifth inning of Game 3. Existing film shows Ruth made a pointing gesture during this at-bat, but what this signified is ambiguous. Though neither fully confirmed nor refuted, the story goes that Ruth pointed to the center field bleachers, supposedly predicting he would hit a home run there. On the next pitch, he hit what was estimated as a nearly 500' "Ruthian" homer to deep center past the flagpole and into the temporary seating in the streets. A few reporters later wrote that Ruth had "called his shot" (like a pool shark), and thus the legend was born. Ruth, ever aware of his larger-than-life public image, was quick to confirm the story once he got wind of it. Conflicting testimony and inconclusive film footage have placed that moment high up in the realm of baseball legend.

== See also ==
- List of World Series sweeps
