= George Magerkurth =

American baseball umpire (1888–1966)

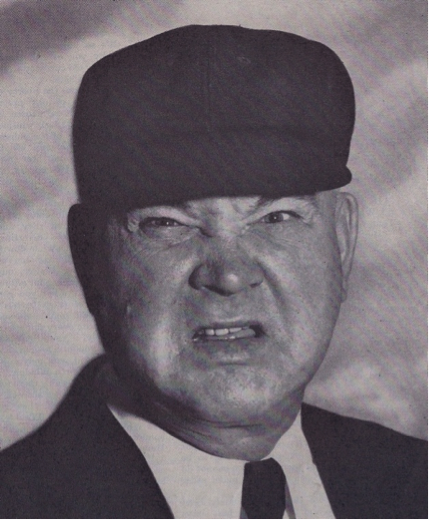
- Born: December 30, 1888; McPherson, Kansas, U.S.
- Died: October 7, 1966 (aged 77); Rock Island, Illinois, U.S.
- Resting place: Greenview Memorial Gardens (East Moline, Illinois)
- Other name: "The Mage"
- Occupations: Umpire, Professional Boxer, Football
- Years active: 1928–1947
- Employer: National League
- Spouse: Millie E. Magerkurth (née Gilmore)
- Children: 5

George Levi Magerkurth (/ˈmɑːdʒərkɜːrθ/ MAH-jər-kurth; December 30, 1888 – October 7, 1966) was an American professional baseball umpire who worked in the National League from 1929 to 1947. Magerkurth umpired 2,814 major league games in his 19-year career. He umpired in four World Series (1932, 1936, 1942 and 1947) and two All-Star Games (1935 and 1939). Magerkurth also played in one game for the Rock Island Independents of the American Professional Football Association in 1920. Magerkurth started out as a minor league catcher, getting trials Hannibal, Rockford, and Duluth in 1907 and 1908. He played for the Kearney Kapitalists in 1910–1911. After working in a factory job, he played football for the Rock Island Independents in 1920 and became a minor league umpire in 1922. Magerkurth umped in the Mississippi Valley League in 1922 and the International League in 1923. He also worked in the American Association and Pacific Coast League before moving up to the NL in 1929. After leaving the NL, Magerkurth umped in some college semi-pro games, and was a baseball commentator for a Moline, IL TV station.

Following the conclusion of a ten-inning 4–3 Brooklyn Dodgers loss to the Cincinnati Reds at Ebbets Field on September 16, 1940, Magerkurth was confronted, knocked down on his back and repeatedly punched by 21-year-old Dodgers fan Frankie Germano. Magerkurth was not injured and declined to press criminal charges. The incident stemmed from a tenth-inning play when he called Ival Goodman safe at second base on a force-out attempt in which Pete Coscarart had bobbled the ball. Instead of two outs, the Dodgers faced a bases loaded situation with one out. The runner at third Mike McCormick scored the eventual deciding run on a Bill Baker sacrifice fly. The second-place Dodgers were eliminated from postseason contention when the Reds defeated the Philadelphia Phillies to win the National League pennant two days later. Germano, who had been on parole, was ordered back to the New York State Vocational Institution to complete his 18-month sentence for assault.

== See also ==
- List of Major League Baseball umpires (disambiguation)
