= Bill Dinneen =

American baseball player and umpire (1876–1955)

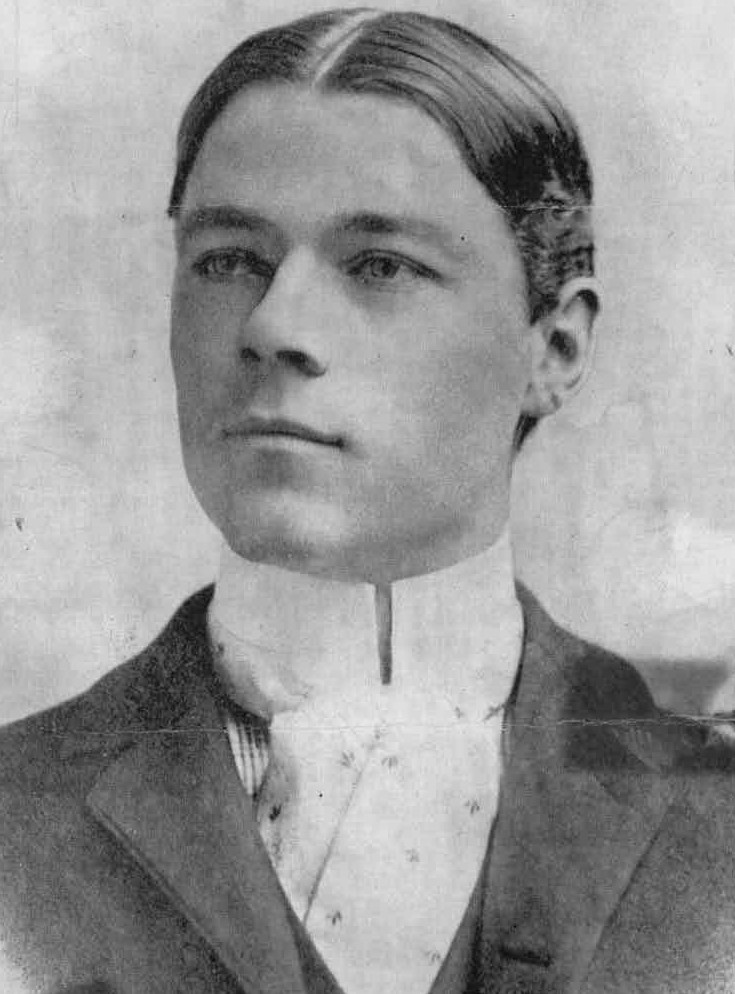
- Pitcher
- Born: April 5, 1876; Syracuse, New York, U.S.
- Died: January 13, 1955 (aged 78); Syracuse, New York, U.S.
- Batted: Right Threw: Right

MLB debut
- April 22, 1898, for the Washington Senators

Last MLB appearance
- August 26, 1909, for the St. Louis Browns

MLB statistics
- Win–loss record: 170–177
- Earned run average: 3.01
- Strikeouts: 1,127
- Stats at Baseball Reference

Teams
- Washington Senators (1898–1899); Boston Beaneaters (1900–1901); Boston Americans (1902–1907); St. Louis Browns (1907–1909)

Career highlights and awards
- World Series champion (1903); Pitched a no-hitter on September 27, 1905; Boston Red Sox Hall of Fame

William Henry Dinneen, alternately spelled Dineen (April 5, 1876 – January 13, 1955), was an American right-handed pitcher in Major League Baseball who followed his 12-year career from 1898 to 1909 with a highly regarded tenure as an American League umpire from 1909 to 1937.

Dinneen was the plate umpire for baseball's first All-Star Game.

He played for the Washington Senators and Boston Braves (both of the National League), and the Boston Red Sox and St. Louis Browns of the American League. Dinneen recorded three wins for the Red Sox over the Pittsburgh Pirates in the first World Series in 1903. Dinneen broke the record for most strikeouts in a World Series game with 11; the previous mark of 10 had been set a day earlier by Pittsburgh's Deacon Phillippe.

== Early life ==
Dinneen was born in Syracuse, New York, on April 5, 1876.

== Playing career ==
He led the AL in losses in 1902 with 21, and led the league in saves in 1903 (2) and 1907 (4). In his remarkable 1904 season for the Red Sox, as they repeated as AL champions, he started 37 games, completing every one of them for a total of 335 2/3 innings pitched, posting a record of 23–14. On June 12, he won a 16-inning contest by a score of 2–1 over the Browns, and four of his next five starts also went at least 10 innings though he only won the first. On the season's final day, October 10, he faced the New York Highlanders in the first game of a doubleheader, with New York needing a sweep to take the pennant from Boston; the opposing pitcher, Jack Chesbro, had already established a modern record with 41 victories. The game went into the final inning tied 2–2 before a wild pitch by Chesbro gave a 3–2 victory, and the flag, to Boston. On September 27, 1905, Dinneen pitched a 2–0 no-hitter against the Chicago White Sox.

== Career as an umpire ==
Dinneen joined the AL umpiring staff on September 12, 1909, just 17 days after his final pitching appearance with the Browns. He umpired in eight World Series (1911, 1914, 1916, 1920, 1924, 1926, 1929, 1932), tying the AL record set by Tommy Connolly. He served as crew chief for the 1914, 1926 and 1932 Series. He was also selected to work in the first All-Star game in 1933, calling balls and strikes for the first half of the game before giving way to the NL's Bill Klem. He was the third base umpire for the game on June 23, 1917, in which Ernie Shore replaced Babe Ruth with no one out and a runner on first base in the first inning, after Ruth was ejected for arguing the calls of plate umpire Brick Owens and then striking Owens. Shore retired the runner as well as all 26 batters he faced.

Dinneen was the home plate umpire on May 18, 1912, when the Detroit Tigers staged a one-game walkout in protest of Ty Cobb's suspension; using replacement players including team coaches as well as college players in attendance, the Tigers lost 24–2 to the Philadelphia Athletics. Dinneen had his own confrontation with Ruth in the 1922 season. On June 19, the outfielder got into an argument with the umpire, and during the next day's game he again insulted the official. In response, AL president Ban Johnson on June 21 sent a letter to Ruth, reading in part:

I was keenly disappointed and amazed when I received Umpire Dinneen's report, recounting your shameful and abusive language to that official in the game at Cleveland last Monday. Bill Dinneen was one of the greatest pitchers the game ever produced, and with common consent we hand to him today the just tribute. He is one of the cleanest and most honorable men baseball ever fostered. ... Your conduct at Cleveland on Monday was reprehensible to a great degree – shocking to every American mother who permits her boy to go to a professional game. The American League cares nothing for Ruth. The individual player means nothing to the organization. When he steps on the ball field he is subject to our control and discipline. ... Again you offended on Tuesday. You branded Umpire Dinneen as 'yellow.' This is the most remarkable declaration a modern ball player has made. Dinneen stands out in the history of the game as one of the most courageous players we have ever had. If you could match up to his standard you would not be in the trough you occupy today. ... Coupled with your misconduct on Monday, you doubled the penalty on Tuesday. You are hereby notified of your suspension for five days without salary. It seems the period has arrived when you should allow some intelligence to creep into a mind that has plainly been warped.

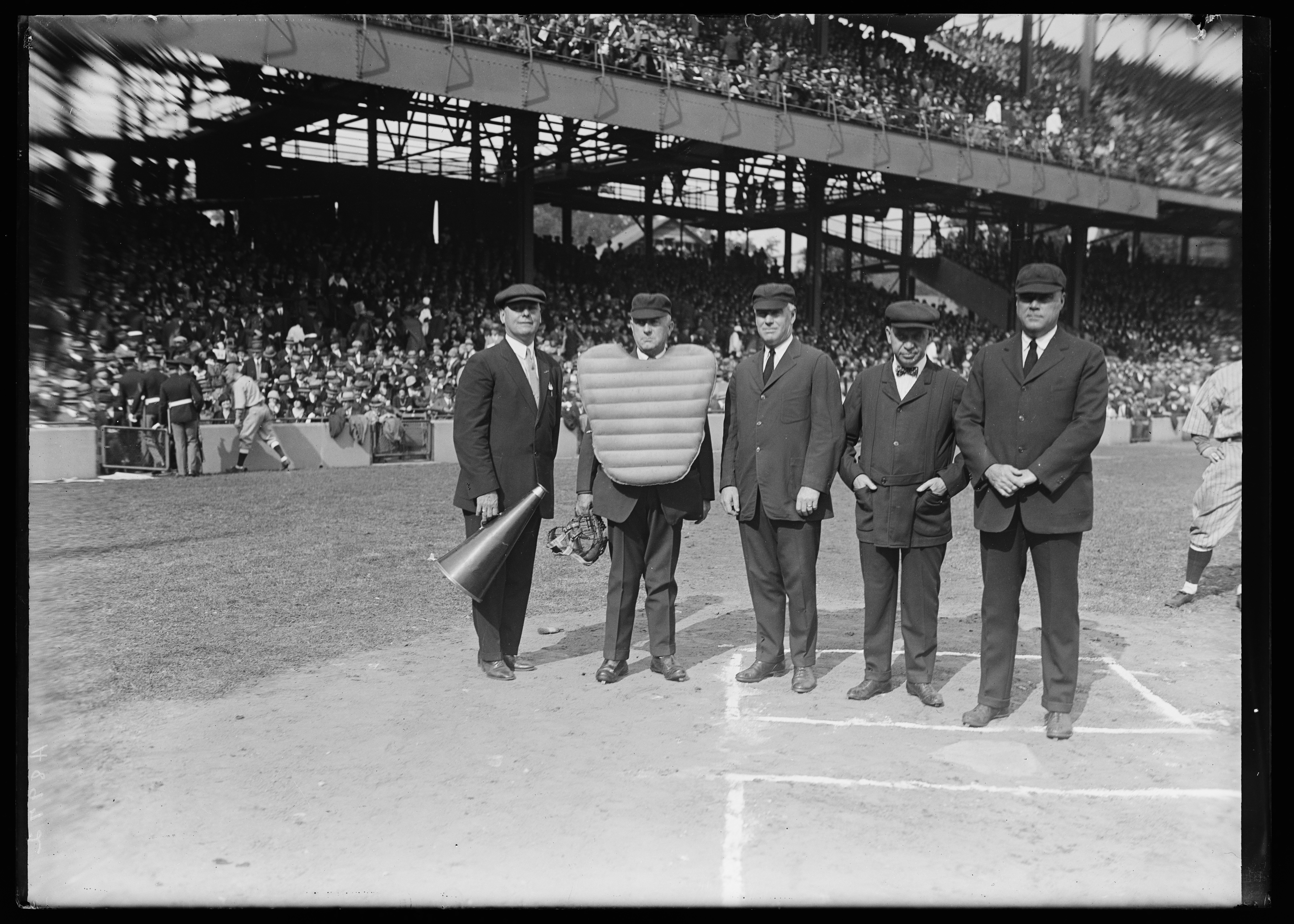
Umpires for the World Series of 1924 lined up before the game with George Phillips, left, official announcer. Left to Right: Phillips, Umpires Bill Dinneen, Bill Klem, Ernest C. Quigley, and Tom Connolly.

In addition to the no-hitter he pitched, Dinneen also called balls and strikes for five other no-hitters (a sixth was broken up in extra innings). He remains the only individual in major league history to both pitch a no-hitter and call one as plate umpire.

For baseball's inaugural All-Star Game in 1933, Dinneen was assigned to be the home plate umpire. The umps rotated during the game, Bill Klem later taking over for Dinneen behind the plate.

In 1946, Dinneen was one of 11 umpires placed on a Roll of Honor by the Baseball Hall of Fame. He threw out the first pitch before Game 2 of the 1953 World Series, the 50th anniversary of his standout World Series performance.

== Later life ==
A lifelong Syracuse resident, he was an investor in a local brewery until 1950. He died at Syracuse Memorial Hospital at the age of 78; his death was attributed to heart disease. He was buried in St. Agnes Cemetery in Utica, New York. His wife, the former Margaret Quinn, died six years previously; he was survived by three sons and a daughter.

Dinneen was mentioned along with teammates Chick Stahl and Cy Young in the 2004 revival of the song "Tessie" by Dropkick Murphys.

== See also ==
- Honor Rolls of Baseball
- List of Major League Baseball annual saves leaders
- List of Major League Baseball no-hitters

Preceded by Frank Smith	No-hitter pitcher September 27, 1905	Succeeded by Johnny Lush
