= Brick Owens =

American baseball umpire (1885–1949)

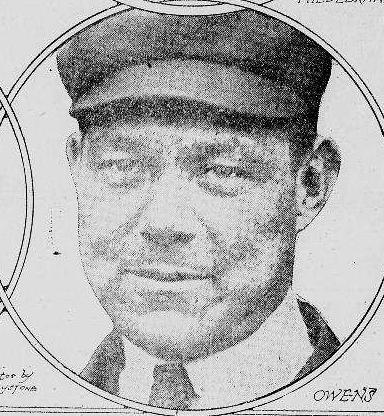
- Owens in a 1922 issue of the New York Tribune
- Born: March 31, 1885; Milwaukee, Wisconsin, U.S.
- Died: November 11, 1949 (aged 64); Chicago, Illinois, U.S.
- Resting place: Fairmount-Willow Hills Memorial Park, Willow Springs, Illinois
- Occupation: Umpire
- Years active: 1908, 1912–1913, 1916–1937
- Employer(s): National League, American League
- Height: 5' 10''

Clarence Bernard "Brick" Owens (March 31, 1885 – November 11, 1949) was an American umpire in Major League Baseball who worked in the National League in 1908 and 1912–1913, and in the American League from 1916 through 1937. He officiated in the World Series in 1918, 1922, 1925, 1928 and 1934, serving as crew chief for the last two Series. He also worked the All-Star Game in 1934, calling balls and strikes for the game's second half.

== Early life and career ==
Born in Milwaukee, Wisconsin, Owens hoped to pursue a baseball career, but accidentally shot himself in the left hand while celebrating the Fourth of July in 1901; instead of staying at home and resting, he went to the sandlot game in which he had intended to play, and replaced the umpire who quit after an early dispute in the game. His family moved to Chicago the following year, and he continued to umpire games for 50 cents each; he soon raised his rate to $1 a game, and upon being noticed by minor league executive Al Tearney, became an umpire in major local contests for $5 a game.

By age 17 he was offered a position on the staff of the Northern League at a monthly salary of $75, but minor league games proved more contentious than sandlot events, and he accumulated so many scars from various altercations that when he was hired by the NL, league president Harry Pulliam asked if Owens had been in a train wreck. In one instance, he called three straight strikes on a batter for Crookston to end a game when the team was mounting a comeback against visiting Winnipeg; the batter dropped his bat and got into a fight with Owens, whereupon a fan jumped from the stands, picked up the bat and hit Owens over the head. After local authorities began the process of bringing charges, the batter's father offered Owens $750 to drop the matter, and he agreed as the amount was double his annual salary. On another occasion, Owens was attacked at his hotel by a player who he had ejected in that day's game, after which the team had refused to replace him and forfeited to the local Fargo team; the player was arrested and suspended.

== Minor league career ==
By mid-1903 Owens had moved to the Western League, and he joined the Missouri Valley League when the Western League reorganized in 1904. He acquired his nickname after a game in Pittsburg, Kansas in which an unpopular call instigated fans to begin throwing bricks from the stands, with one hitting Owens in the head; when he miraculously returned days later with no serious injury, a player named Charley Lyons gave him the nickname, which he said he found more acceptable than some other things he had been called. He moved on to the American Association in 1905–1906, then the Eastern League in 1907 before returning to the American Association from 1908 to 1912. After a 1906 game, local Minneapolis officials tried to get an injunction to overturn a call he made to end the contest, which brought on the ejections of seven Minneapolis Millers players. The next day, Owens was the target of fans throwing eggs and cabbages from the stands, and a mob followed him to his hotel, which they threatened to attack if he was not turned over; police had to evacuate him over the rooftops and to the railway station. In a 1908 game in Milwaukee, he fought off 50 fans after a game-ending decision before being rescued by police. Another Milwaukee incident saw a rescuing policeman get his finger bitten off.

== Major league career ==
After briefly working in the NL in 1908, he had an offer from Pulliam to join the NL staff in 1909, but the offer fell through due to Pulliam's subsequent illness.

Owens and fellow umpire Will Brennan were hurt during the first game of the August 20, 1912 double-header between the Brooklyn Dodgers and Pittsburgh Pirates at Forbes Field. Owens, who had started the game umpiring first base, had taken over home plate duties after Brennan's season-ending injury (a broken right kneecap and torn ligaments suffered during a fall while running to cover second base) in the first inning. Then, in the second inning, Owens was struck in the chest by a foul ball, tearing several rib ligaments and leaving him with a broken breast bone. His exit marked the first — and so far only — known time that two umpires left the same major league game due to injury. Brennan and Owens were both hospitalized overnight at St. John's hospital.

Later in 1912, after Pittsburgh Pirates owner Barney Dreyfuss took exception to one of Owens's decisions, he had the umpire followed by a private detective and accused him of visiting gambling houses. The league released Owens to satisfy the Pirates owner, and Owens then worked in the International League (the renamed Eastern League) in 1913 before returning to the American Association in 1914–1915. American League president Ban Johnson hired him for the 1916 season, one year after the death of umpire Jack Sheridan. After his minor league experiences, the relatively calm environment cultivated by Johnson was a relief, and Owens only had few notable confrontations before retiring due to illness after 22 seasons umpiring in the AL.

== Notable games ==
Owens is perhaps best known for umpiring the game of June 23, 1917, in which Babe Ruth was the starting pitcher for the Boston Red Sox. Ruth walked the first batter for the Washington Senators in four pitches, and was promptly ejected by Owens for disputing his calls; Ruth was so incensed by the ejection that he punched Owens. Ernie Shore replaced Ruth as the Red Sox pitcher, and not only picked the runner off first base but went on to retire the next 26 Washington batters; long regarded as a perfect game by Shore for retiring 27 men without permitting anyone to reach base, the game is now officially regarded as a combined no-hitter by Ruth and Shore.

Owens was the home plate umpire in the game where Ray Caldwell got struck by lightning. https://www.baseball-reference.com/boxes/CLE/CLE191908240.shtml

Owens was also the home plate umpire on June 15, 1925, when the Philadelphia Athletics scored 13 runs in the bottom of the eighth inning, coming back from a 15–4 deficit to defeat the Cleveland Indians 17–15, and tying the major league record for the greatest deficit overcome to win a game. In this game, Owens suffered two broken hip bones when he was involved in a collision at the plate with Freddy Spurgeon. He was expected to miss the rest of the season.

== Death ==
Owens died at age 64 in Chicago after suffering a heart attack at the wholesale meat distributor where he had worked as a salesman since leaving baseball. He was buried in Fairmount-Willow Hills Memorial Park in Willow Springs, Illinois.

== See also ==
- List of Major League Baseball umpires (disambiguation)
