= Silk O'Loughlin =

American baseball umpire (1872-1918)

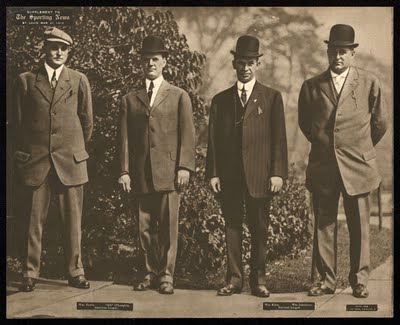
Umpires Billy Evans, O'Loughlin, Bill Klem, and Jim Johnstone in 1909.

Francis H. "Silk" O'Loughlin (August 15, 1872 – December 20, 1918) was an American umpire in Major League Baseball who worked in the American League from 1902 to 1918. He umpired in the World Series in 1906, 1909, 1912, 1915 and 1917, serving as crew chief in 1917.

== Early life ==
Born in Rochester, New York, O'Loughlin was one of six children. His father died when he was five years old. He entered baseball with the help of pitcher Stump Weidman, a relative, and umpired in the New York, Atlantic and Eastern Leagues from 1898 to 1901. O'Loughlin may have acquired his nickname as a child when neighbors commented on the fine quality of his hair. However, at least one source describes the nickname coming much later when players saw him wearing a silk hat.

== Major league career ==
=== Distinctive style ===
Silk came to the American League in 1902. He brought a unique style with him, originating the loud exclamations signaling balls, strikes and outs. Previously, umpires had simply informed the catcher or nearest defensive player of their calls. He was particularly known for his booming call of "ball tuh" and his drawn-out strike calls, as well as his snappy calls of foul balls. A 1909 New York Times article criticized the quiet work of umpire Billy Evans, saying, "Though they laugh at Silk O’Loughlin, everybody knows just what he says." Years later, Evans himself would remark, "Silk was a bundle of nerves. From the start of the game until the finish he was on edge. Baseball was a serious proposition for him."

Perceptions differ as to O'Loughlin's tolerance for disagreements. In 1911 he said, "I wouldn't give a snap for a player who wouldn't kick if he honestly thought he was right. Umpires have to stand the brunt of kicks, but if the player is one of the kind who is always thinking of winning and makes his kick and walks away, I don't mind it." However, the following year Christy Mathewson wrote that O'Loughlin was "the autocrat of baseball" and that he "refuses to let the players discuss a decision with him, maintaining that there is never any room for argument. If a man makes any talk with him, it is quick to the shower bath." Silk agreed with at least part of that statement. He was frequently quoted as saying, "A man is always out or safe, or it is a ball or a strike, and the umpire, if he is a good man and knows his business, is always right."

O'Loughlin's physical presentation was unique among his contemporaries. He wore creased pants and players joked about risking injury from the sharp creases if they slid near him. He also sported a large diamond on his hand while on the field. A 1907 Coca-Cola ad featured Silk making a strike call.

=== Hand signals ===
Though well known for his voice, O'Loughlin also began using "Dummy Hoy's mute signal code" to indicate the calls visually after he "sprained his larynx" in a confrontation. The rules committee ultimately opted against formal adoption, but O'Loughlin continued to use his signals and to improve upon them.

=== Notable games ===
O'Loughlin umpired in ten no-hitters during his brief career, a record not broken until 2001. He was behind the plate for seven of the ten. He was the base umpire for Addie Joss' perfect game on October 2, 1908. On July 29, 1911, he became the last major league umpire to work a no-hitter singlehandedly when he called Smoky Joe Wood's gem.

O'Loughlin is well remembered for a call during the 1907 pennant race that went against Connie Mack's Athletics in a game against Detroit. The call concerned possible interference by a policeman with a Detroit defender. It appears that O'Loughlin did not initially note any interference, but after conferring with fellow umpire Tommy Connolly, the Athletics batter was called out. Mack angrily protested, later going so far as to send affidavits from nearby fans and the policeman to league president Ban Johnson. The game was ultimately called a tie on account of darkness after seventeen innings and the second game of the scheduled doubleheader was postponed. Though Mack's team would finish 1 1/2 games out of first place, Mack would still blame O'Loughlin for the loss of the pennant more than forty years later.

Silk was the first umpire to eject Ty Cobb from a major league game. The year was 1908, Cobb's fourth season in the majors.

The early part of the 1912 season was particularly eventful for O'Loughlin. On May 11, 1912, Silk was the target of glass bottles thrown by fans of the beleaguered New York Highlanders. O'Loughlin angered fans by ejecting catcher Gabby Street, pitcher Jack Quinn and manager Harry Wolverton for arguing balls and strikes. Just four days later, O'Loughlin ejected Ty Cobb after the slugger severely beat a disabled fan who was thought to have thrown a racial slur at Cobb. The incident raised concerns about player protection from heckling fans and it nearly precipitated a player strike.

== Outside of baseball ==
In 1904, O'Loughlin ran unsuccessfully for New York State Assembly. O'Loughlin, running on the Democratic ticket, was badly beaten. He would later say, "I think that the public made a rotten decision."

O'Loughlin worked for the Justice Department in the Boston District from the end of the 1918 season until his death less than four months later.

== Death ==
O'Loughlin contracted influenza during the 1918 epidemic that shortened the baseball season. Within a few days, he developed double pneumonia and died at his Boston home. He was just 46 years old. O'Loughlin's wife had fallen ill with influenza around the same time, but she recovered.

== See also ==
- Honor Rolls of Baseball
