= Lists of Major League Baseball umpires =

Lists of Major League Baseball umpires include:

- List of Major League Baseball umpires (A–F)
- List of Major League Baseball umpires (G–M)
- List of Major League Baseball umpires (N–Z)

== See also ==
- List of Major League Baseball umpiring leaders
