= Rally Squirrel =

Baseball Mascot

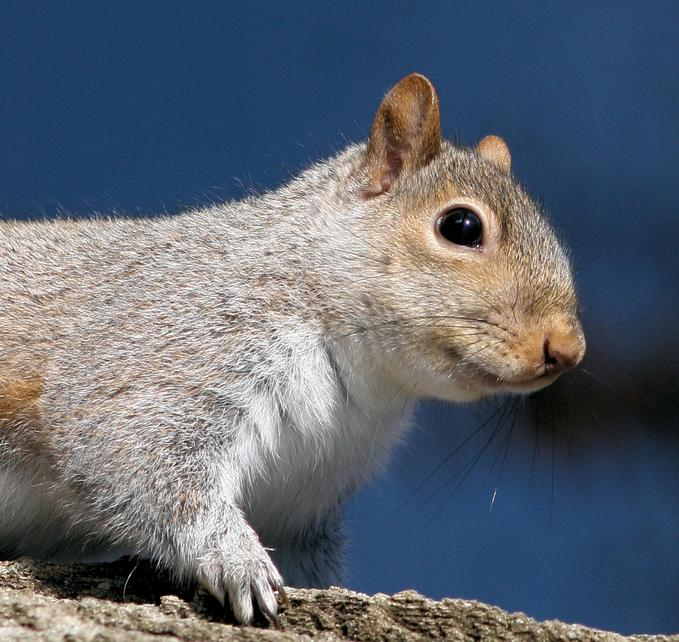
- Rally Squirrel was an eastern grey squirrel, as shown here
- Other name: Busch Stadium Squirrel
- Species: Sciurus carolinensis
- Years active: 2011–2012, 2015, 2018, 2023

Rally Squirrel is the name given to an eastern gray squirrel (Sciurus carolinensis) which appeared on the field and ran across home plate at Busch Stadium during a 2011 National League Division Series (NLDS) Major League Baseball game between the Philadelphia Phillies and St. Louis Cardinals on October 5, 2011. The squirrel captured American media attention, and was adopted as an unofficial mascot by the Cardinals and the populace of St. Louis. The Cardinals would go on to win the 2011 World Series in dramatic fashion.

== Appearances ==
On October 4, a gray squirrel appeared in the outfield during Game 3 of the Phillies–Cardinals National League Division Series, causing an interruption in play.

During the fifth inning of Game 4 on October 5, a squirrel again appeared on the field. Play was not interrupted, but the squirrel caused considerable confusion, running across home plate as Phillies pitcher Roy Oswalt was delivering a pitch to Skip Schumaker. The squirrel then jumped into the stands. Umpire Ángel Hernández called the pitch a ball; Oswalt and Philadelphia manager Charlie Manuel argued, unsuccessfully, that Oswalt had been distracted by the squirrel and that "no pitch" should be called. Manuel later avowed that, if he had a firearm, he would have shot the obstreperous rodent. Some commentators speculated that the October 4 and October 5 squirrels were the same animal, but this was not proven.

Before Game 5 of the NLDS in Philadelphia, Oswalt was again accosted by a squirrel near the warning track at Citizens Bank Park. Philadelphia fans taunted the Cardinals by throwing a stuffed squirrel into the team's bullpen. Cardinals pitcher Octavio Dotel retrieved it, and kept it in his locker. The Cardinals defeated the Phillies in five games, and Dotel said he would keep the squirrel through the World Series. "They didn't know that it's our good luck; they gave us good luck to our bullpen and that's why the bullpen has been so great lately", commented Dotel about the Philadelphia fans.

On October 16 in Milwaukee, Dotel and teammates toasted the stuffed squirrel and sprayed it with champagne and beer while celebrating their NLCS victory over the Milwaukee Brewers, which sent them to the World Series against the Texas Rangers.

=== Return ===
On June 19, 2015, the Cardinals were once again playing the Philadelphia Phillies at Citizens Bank Park in Philadelphia. During the fifth inning, a squirrel started climbing up the net behind home plate, ran along the guide wire, jumped on top of the Phillies dugout, and then appeared to jump at Chase Utley, the Phillies second baseman. Soon after, the appearance of the squirrel was called the return of the Rally Squirrel. The Cardinals won this game 12-4.

== Public reaction ==
A Twitter account purporting to be that of the Rally Squirrel was activated on October 4, 2011; by October 6 it had 11,000 followers and 27,000 by late October. By October 5, the squirrel had his own theme song, and by October 6 Rally Squirrel T-shirts were in production. Within a few days, these were reported as "flying off the shelves" with "thousands" being sold, while Rally Squirrel costumes were reported as becoming "one of the hot Halloween costumes" of the season.

On October 11, 2011, a different Rally Squirrel appeared at a press conference in Kiener Plaza, where Cardinal Glennon Children's Foundation announced that it had adopted the Rally Squirrel as its mascot for a fundraising drive. On the same date, the Cardinals announced that the Rally Squirrel would be participating in an October 12 team rally and that 40,000 rally towels with a squirrel motif would be distributed at that day's game of the 2011 National League Championship Series (which was Game 3, a 4-3 Cardinals victory). The Rally Squirrel, in the form of a performer wearing a squirrel costume with a Cardinals jersey, indeed joined the existing Cardinals costumed mascot Fredbird at pre-game rally events during the remainder of the postseason; this Rally Squirrel also assisted Fredbird and Team Fredbird in passing out T-shirts in the stands at Busch Stadium between innings.

By October 14, 2011, sales of Rally Squirrel T-shirts had generated approximately $210,000 for the Cardinal Glennon Children's Foundation.

The Rally Squirrel gained notoriety again in late January 2012 when it was announced that it would be immortalized with a Topps baseball card. The special-edition card is actually that of Cardinals player Skip Schumaker but instead of the traditional "face shot" the card features only Schumaker's pant leg in the photo background as the Rally Squirrel is seen dashing across the batters box. The Rally Squirrel was also immortalized on the St. Louis World Series rings. St. Louis singer/songwriter, Randy Mayfield wrote the song, "Rally Squirrel" that was featured on Fox News and on Fox Sports during game 6 of the 2011 World Series.

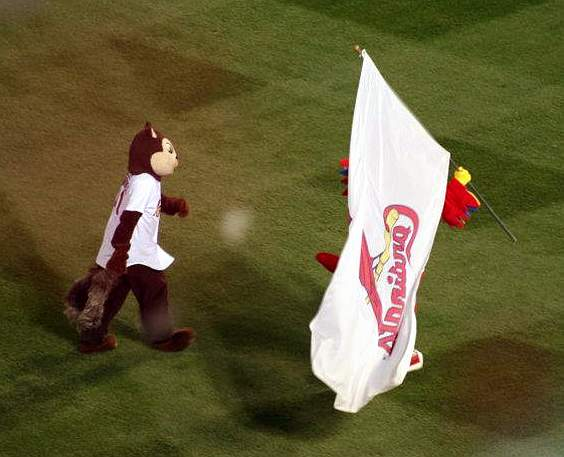
Rally Squirrel and Cardinals mascot Fredbird walking the field at Busch Stadium during Game 7 of the 2011 World Series.

== Disposition ==
A squirrel believed to be the Rally Squirrel was captured at Busch Stadium on October 8 and turned over to the Wildlife Rescue Center for eventual release in Castlewood State Park. As of October 11, four squirrels had been captured at Busch Stadium. The squirrel believed to be the actual Rally Squirrel was eventually released near the Wildlife Rescue Center's facility in Ballwin, Missouri.

== Decline to obscurity ==
By the 2013 season, when the Cardinals again advanced to the World Series (although they lost to the Boston Red Sox), Rally Squirrel had faded into obscurity, with the St. Louis Post-Dispatch reporting that at the time of the World Series "you'd be hard-pressed to find any remnants of the squirrel today at the Cardinals store at Busch Stadium, aside from a pile or two of generic stuffed squirrels near the counter".

On May 6, 2023, another squirrel interrupted play at Busch Stadium. Sportskeeda described this as "Rally Squirrel's comeback".

In 2026, Phillips Petroleum offered a 15th anniversary Rally Squirrel pin as part of a promotion.

== Other baseball squirrels ==
A squirrel which held up play several times at Progressive Field in Cleveland on August 25, 2004 was also called Rally Squirrel. Other squirrels have appeared on baseball playing fields from time to time, occasionally interrupting play or gaining minor press notice.

On September 4, 2007, a squirrel darted onto the field at Busch Stadium. That squirrel, which was captured and released into the wild, was also nicknamed Rally Squirrel.

On May 13, 2017, also at Progressive Field in Cleveland, a squirrel raced in from right field and reached the area around the pitcher's mound, forcing the umpires to halt play. The home team lost 4-1 to the Minnesota Twins. "Those type of things are funnier when you're ahead" Cleveland Indians manager Terry Francona said. This squirrel was also referred to as Rally Squirrel.

In August 2019, a squirrel interrupted play at Target Field on two consecutive nights. On the second night, the interruption was followed by the Twins scoring four runs in a game they went on to win 14-4, which led to this squirrel also being dubbed "Rally Squirrel".

== See also ==
- Rally Monkey
- Rat Trick
- List of Major League Baseball mascots
- 2011 St. Louis Cardinals season
