= Rally Monkey =

Unofficial mascot for the Los Angeles baseball team

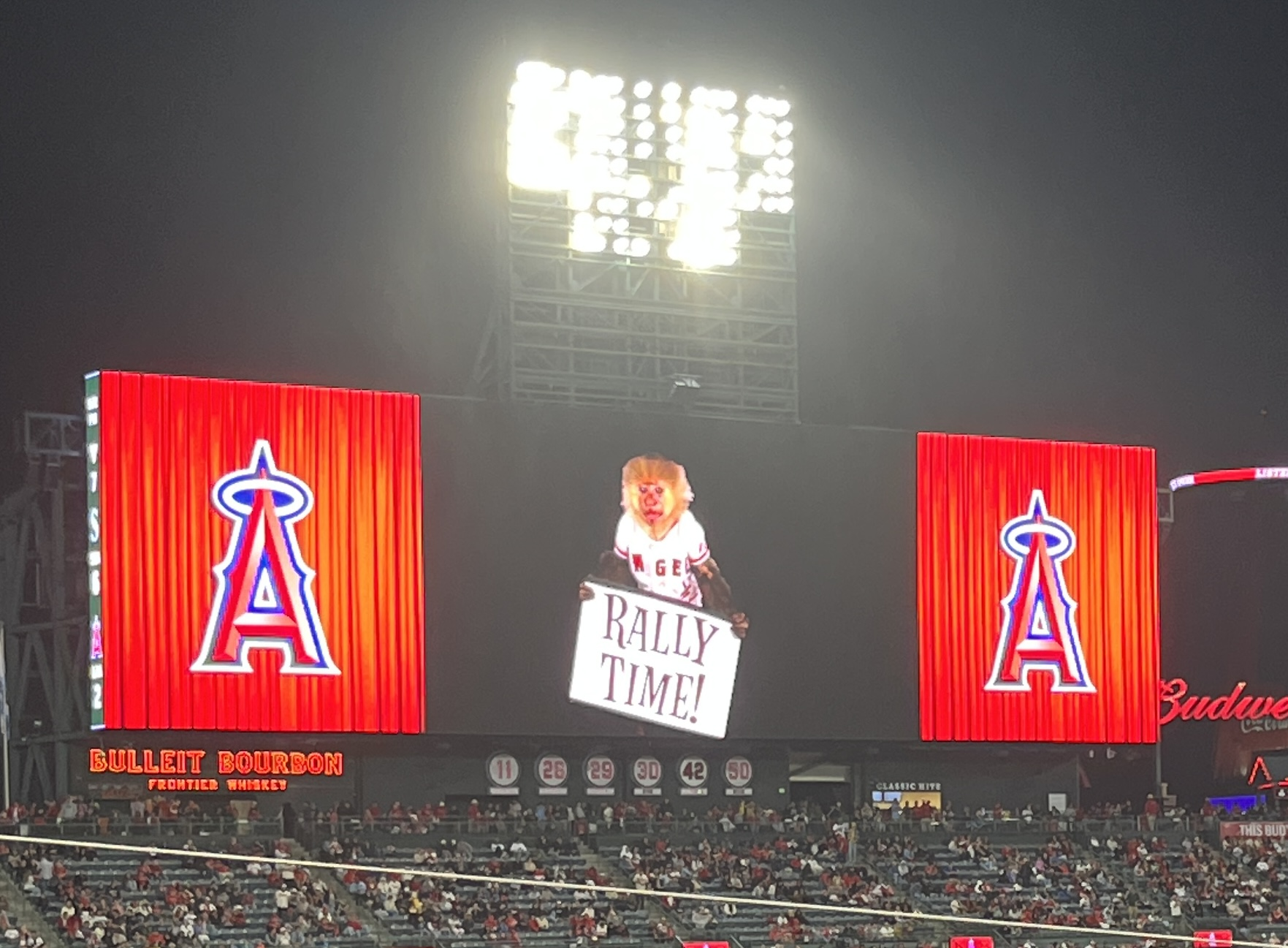
The Rally Monkey on the jumbotron at Angel Stadium - 2023

The Rally Monkey is the unofficial mascot for the Los Angeles Angels Major League Baseball team.

== Introduction ==
The character debuted on June 6, 2000, when the Angels were trailing the San Francisco Giants 5–4 in the bottom of the ninth inning. Two video board operators, Dean Fraulino and Jaysen Humes, took a clip of a monkey jumping around from the 1994 comedy movie Ace Ventura: Pet Detective, and superimposed the words "RALLY MONKEY!" on top of it. The Angels scored two runs and won the game.

== Growing popularity ==
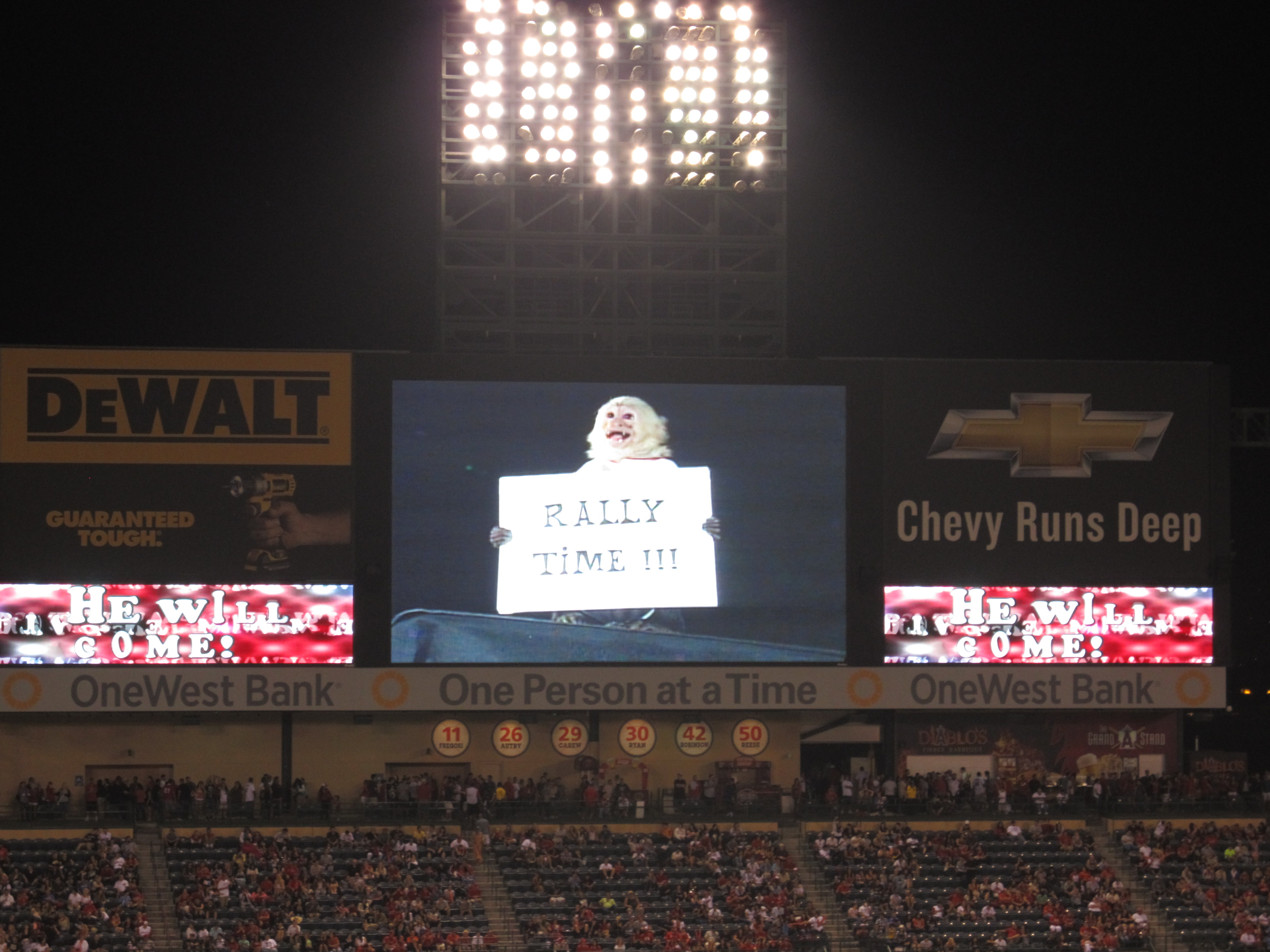
The Rally Monkey in 2011.

The video clip proved to be so popular that the team hired Katie, a white-haired capuchin monkey who previously appeared as Marcel in the television sitcom Friends, to star in original clips for later games. When seen, she bounces to the House of Pain song "Jump Around" and sometimes holds a sign proclaiming that it is "RALLY TIME!"

The rally monkey came to national attention during the Angels' appearance in the 2002 World Series, again against the San Francisco Giants. In the sixth game, the Angels were playing at home, but were trailing the series 3-2 and facing elimination. They were down 5-0 as the game entered the bottom of the seventh inning. Amid fervid rally-monkey themed fan support, the Angels proceeded to score six unanswered runs over the next two innings, winning the game and turning the momentum of the series for good (they went on to clinch the championship in game 7).

In 2009, the Angels once again reached the post-season, sparking a renewal of the rally monkey's popularity.

== Cultural references ==
Additional videos featuring the Rally Monkey show her edited into popular films and TV shows such as The Brady Bunch Movie, Jurassic Park, Field of Dreams, Star Trek, Risky Business, WarGames, and Animal House. The Angels started selling plush monkeys that fans bring to games.

ESPN did a SportsCenter commercial in which it showed one of the executives having to make "budget cuts," leading to the release of the monkey. The monkey pleaded by raising the "It's Rally Time" sign.

In one installment of the popular comic strip Get Fuzzy, the strip's (feline) protagonist, Bucky Katt, attempts to travel to Anaheim to eat the Rally Monkey after seeing it on television, as part of a running gag focused on Bucky's irrational desire to eat a monkey.

== See also ==
- Rally Squirrel
- Rat trick
