= George Khoury =

George Khoury or Khouri may refer to:

- George Khoury (author) (born 1971), writer and journalist in the field of comic books
- George Khoury (bishop) (born 1970), Greek bishop
- George Khoury (molecular biologist) (1943–1987), National Cancer Institute researcher
- George Khoury (murder victim) (1983–2004), a murdered Israeli Arab Christian
- George Khoury (record producer) (1909–1998), record producer
- George Khouri (footballer) (born 1962), footballer from Syria
- George Khoury (actor), actor in films such as Looking for Danger (1957)

== See also ==
- George Khoury Association of Baseball Leagues
- Khouri or Khoury, a Levantine surname
