= Ryan Roberts (baseball) =

American baseball player (born 1980)

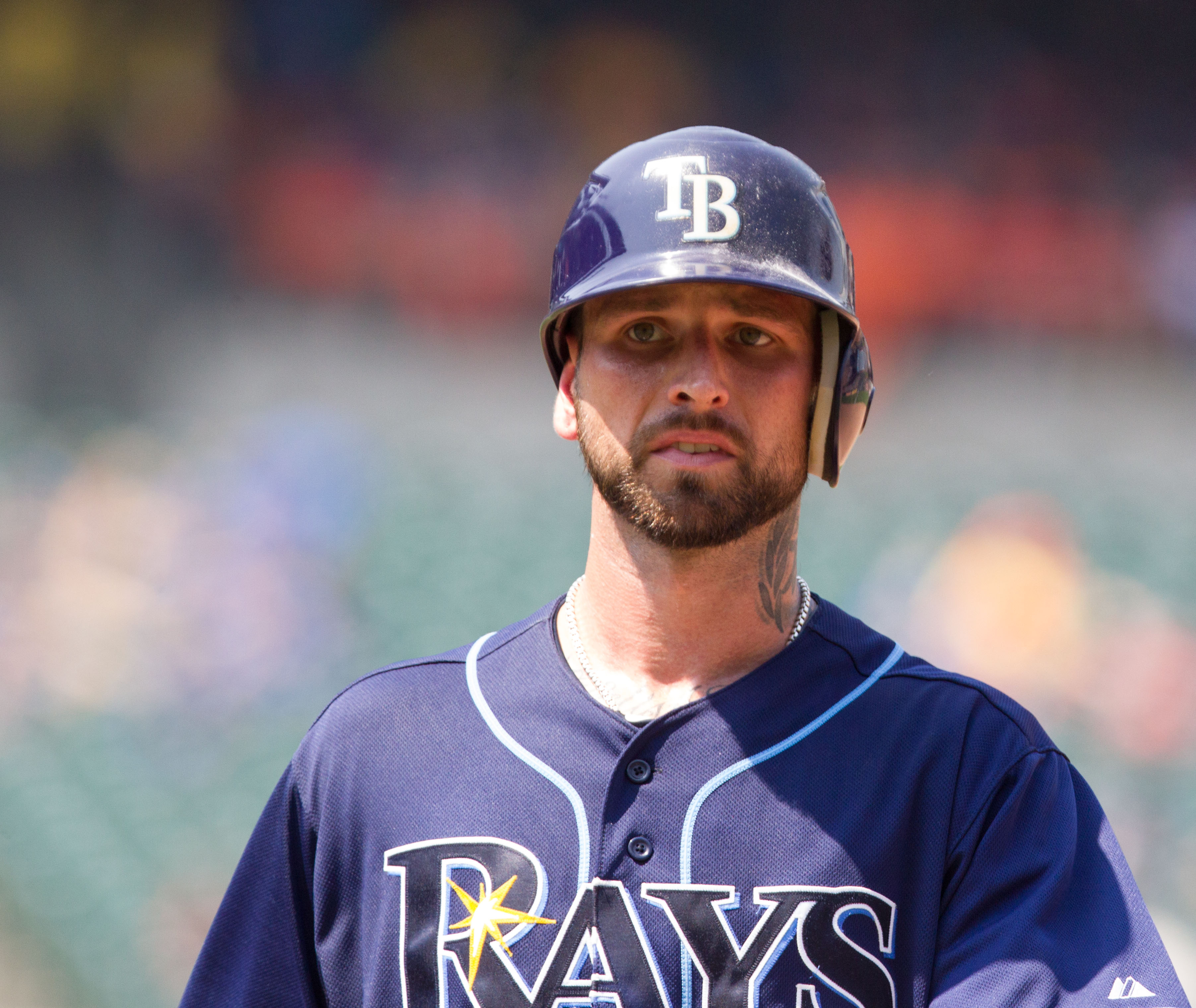
- Roberts with the Tampa Bay Rays
- Third baseman / Second baseman
- Born: September 19, 1980 (age 46); Fort Worth, Texas, U.S.
- Batted: Right Threw: Right

MLB debut
- July 30, 2006, for the Toronto Blue Jays

Last MLB appearance
- April 17, 2014, for the Boston Red Sox

MLB statistics
- Batting average: .243
- Home runs: 46
- Runs batted in: 169
- Stats at Baseball Reference

Teams
- Toronto Blue Jays (2006–2007); Texas Rangers (2008); Arizona Diamondbacks (2009–2012); Tampa Bay Rays (2012–2013); Boston Red Sox (2014)

Ryan Alan Roberts (born September 19, 1980) is an American former professional baseball third baseman and second baseman. A right-handed batter, Roberts is 5 feet 11 inches (1.80 m) tall and weighs 190 pounds (86 kg). He has played in Major League Baseball (MLB) for the Toronto Blue Jays, Texas Rangers, Arizona Diamondbacks, Tampa Bay Rays and Boston Red Sox. During his tenure in Arizona, he was known by fans as "Tatman" because he has over 30 tattoos.

== College career ==
After graduating from L. D. Bell High School, Roberts' team won an NJCAA Division III World Series his sophomore year at Eastfield Junior College in Mesquite, Texas. Roberts was an All-American with a .475 batting average, 17 home runs, and 73 RBIs, and was named a MAC All-Conference and All-American Selection at shortstop.

Roberts transferred to the University of Texas at Arlington. After his senior year in 2003, he was named Southland Conference Player of the Year and Hitter of the Year. He was among the conference leaders in eight different offensive categories, was first-team all-SLC as a third baseman, and was also named to several All-America teams. In 2003, Baseball America analyst John Manuel described Roberts as the best player on UTA's squad which also included Hunter Pence.

== Professional career ==
=== Toronto Blue Jays ===
The Toronto Blue Jays selected Roberts with the 530th overall pick of the 2003 draft, in the 18th round. Roberts signed with the Blue Jays and made his professional debut in the New York–Penn League.

He was named to the 2005 Eastern League All-Star team. The Blue Jays allocated Roberts to the Arizona Fall League that off-season, and on November 18 of that year, they purchased his contract from the New Hampshire Fisher Cats and added him to their 40-man roster.

Roberts began the 2006 season in Triple-A Syracuse before being called up to the 25-man Toronto Blue Jays roster. On August 3, 2006, Roberts hit a solo home run in Yankee Stadium, his first hit in a Major League Baseball game.

In 2007 Roberts batted .249 in AAA, and then went 1–13 in the major leagues. After the 2007 season, Roberts' was released by the Blue Jays.

=== Texas Rangers ===
Roberts signed a minor league contract with the Texas Rangers on November 21, 2007, with an invitation to spring training. Roberts was called up to the Rangers for a few days and got one pinch-hit at bat.

=== Arizona Diamondbacks ===
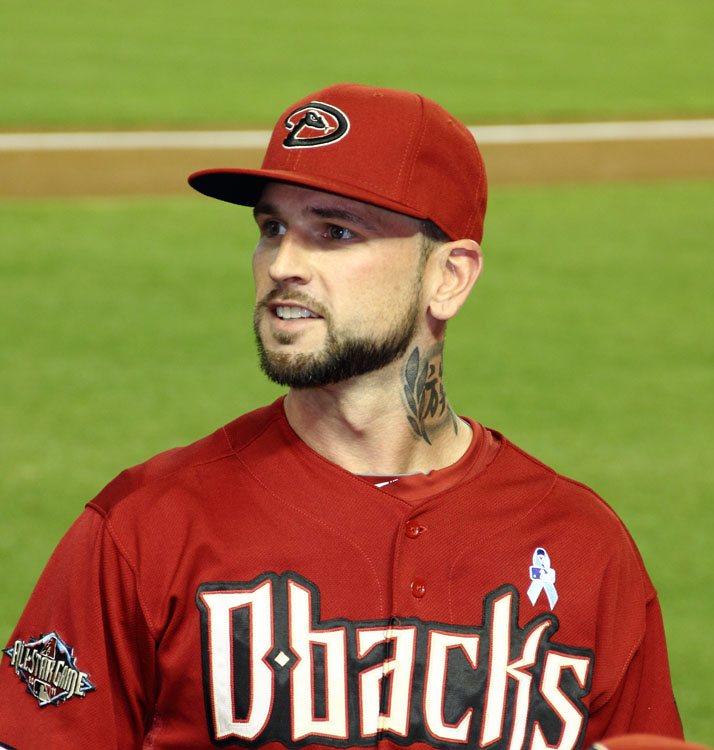
Roberts during his tenure with the Arizona Diamondbacks in 2011.

In November 2008, Roberts signed a minor league deal with the Arizona Diamondbacks. He made the opening day roster for the first time in his career. He played mostly as a utility player during the 2009 season with the Diamondbacks.

Through June 13, 2009, Roberts had a .274 batting average in the minor leagues, and a .243 batting average in the major leagues in 111 at bats.

When the Diamondbacks traded second baseman Felipe López on July 20, 2009, Ryan Roberts was named the Diamondbacks everyday second baseman. In the 2009 season, Roberts hit .279 with 8 home runs and 25 RBI, while playing at second base for 57 games, third base for 19 games, and left field for 16 games.

In game 4 of the 2011 NLDS against the Brewers, Roberts hit a two-out grand slam in the first inning to help keep the Diamondbacks alive in the postseason. This home run came only a week after Roberts' first career grand slam, a game-winning walk-off grand slam capping a dramatic 10th inning rally to defeat the Los Angeles Dodgers 7–6, as well as a day after teammate Paul Goldschmidt hit a grand slam in game 3 of the NLDS. During this walk-off grand slam, Roberts began pumping his left arm in a salute to the teams' manager Kirk Gibson's 1988 World Series game one home run.

After 83 games with Arizona in 2012, he amassed a .250 batting average with six home runs, six stolen bases, nine doubles, and 34 runs batted in. On July 24, Roberts was designated for assignment.

=== Tampa Bay Rays ===
Hours after being designated for assignment on July 24, Roberts was traded to the Tampa Bay Rays for minor league infielder Tyler Bortnick. On July 25 Ryan hit a two-run homer against Baltimore in the top of the third.

On August 15, 2013, Roberts was designated for assignment by the Rays to make room for pitcher Alex Cobb who was coming off the DL.

=== Chicago Cubs ===
On December 13, 2013, Roberts agreed to a minor league deal with an invitation to spring training with the Chicago Cubs. He was released on March 27, 2014.

=== Boston Red Sox ===
On April 7, 2014, Roberts agreed to a Major League deal with the Boston Red Sox. The Sox were looking for some infield depth after Will Middlebrooks was placed on the 15-day disabled list. He was designated for assignment on April 18, 2014, and outrighted to Triple-A Pawtucket three days later. Roberts elected free agency in October 2014.

=== Oakland Athletics ===
Roberts signed a minor league deal with the Kansas City Royals on November 12, 2014. He was released on March 28, 2015. He signed a minor league deal with the Oakland Athletics on April 26, 2015. He played the entire 2015 season with the Triple-A Nashville Sounds and elected to become a free agent after the season.

== See also ==
- List of Major League Baseball ultimate grand slams
