= 2018 American League Division Series =

Teams
| Team (Wins) | | Manager | Season |
| Boston Red Sox (3) | | Alex Cora | 108–54 (.667), GA: 8 |
| New York Yankees (1) | | Aaron Boone | 100–62 (.617), GB: 8 |
- Dates: October 5–9
- Television: TBS
- TV announcers: Brian Anderson, Ron Darling, and Lauren Shehadi
- Radio: ESPN
- Radio announcers: Jon Sciambi and Jessica Mendoza
- Umpires: Dan Bellino, Cory Blaser, Fieldin Culbreth, Angel Hernandez, D. J. Reyburn, Mike Winters (crew chief)

Teams
| Team (Wins) | | Manager | Season |
| Houston Astros (3) | | A. J. Hinch | 103–59 (.636), GA: 6 |
| Cleveland Indians (0) | | Terry Francona | 91–71 (.562), GA: 13 |
- Dates: October 5–8
- Television: TBS
- TV announcers: Don Orsillo, Dennis Eckersley, and Hazel Mae
- Radio: ESPN
- Radio announcers: Dave Flemming and Jim Bowden
- Umpires: Chris Conroy, Chad Fairchild, Andy Fletcher, Jerry Layne (crew chief), Jeff Nelson, Tim Timmons
- ALWC: New York Yankees defeated Oakland Athletics, 7–2

The 2018 American League Division Series were two best-of-five playoff series in Major League Baseball’s (MLB) 2018 postseason to determine the participating teams of the 2018 American League Championship Series. The three divisional winners, seeded 1–3, and a fourth team — the Wild Card Game winner — played in two series. These matchups were:

- (1) Boston Red Sox (AL East champions) vs. (4) New York Yankees (Wild Card Game winner): Red Sox won the series, 3–1.
- (2) Houston Astros (AL West champions) vs. (3) Cleveland Indians (AL Central champions): Astros won the series, 3–0.

The higher seeded team in each series hosted Games 1, 2, and 5 (if necessary), and the lower seeded team Games 3 and 4 (if necessary).

Under sponsorship agreements with T-Mobile, the series was formally known as the American League Division Series presented by T-Mobile. The Astros and Red Sox won their respective series, to advance to the Championship Series. This is the first time since 1999 that all four ALDS participants from the previous year returned to the ALDS this year.

The Red Sox went on to defeat the Astros in the ALCS, then win the 2018 World Series over the National League champion Los Angeles Dodgers.

== Background ==
The Red Sox entered the ALDS as the 1 seed, having won the AL East with the best regular season with a record of 108–54, giving them home-field advantage throughout the entire playoffs. The second-seeded Astros won the AL West, going 103–59. The AL Central champion Indians were seeded third via their 91–71 record. The final participant was the winner of the AL Wild Card Game, the Yankees.

This was the 13th ALDS appearance for Boston and the third appearance for Houston; the Red Sox lost to the Astros in the 2017 ALDS. This was the 10th ALDS appearance for Cleveland and the 20th appearance for New York; the Indians lost to the Yankees in the 2017 ALDS. This was the first season ever three teams finished with 100-wins in the same league.

The Red Sox and Yankees met 19 times during the regular season, with Boston winning 10 of the games; this was the first postseason meeting between the two rivals since the famed 2004 ALCS, which Boston took in seven games after falling behind 3–0 en route to its first World Series title in 86 years. The Astros and Indians met seven times during the regular season, with Houston holding a 4–3 edge; this was the first time the teams met in postseason play.

== Matchups ==
=== Boston Red Sox vs. New York Yankees ===
Boston won the series, 3–1.

| Game | Date | Score | Location | Time | Attendance |
|---|---|---|---|---|---|
| 1 | October 5 | New York Yankees – 4, Boston Red Sox – 5 | Fenway Park | 3:41 | 39,059 |
| 2 | October 6 | New York Yankees – 6, Boston Red Sox – 2 | Fenway Park | 3:31 | 39,151 |
| 3 | October 8 | Boston Red Sox – 16, New York Yankees – 1 | Yankee Stadium | 3:41 | 49,657 |
| 4 | October 9 | Boston Red Sox – 4, New York Yankees – 3 | Yankee Stadium | 3:28 | 49,641 |

=== Houston Astros vs. Cleveland Indians ===
Houston won the series, 3–0.

| Game | Date | Score | Location | Time | Attendance |
|---|---|---|---|---|---|
| 1 | October 5 | Cleveland Indians – 2, Houston Astros – 7 | Minute Maid Park | 3:36 | 43,514 |
| 2 | October 6 | Cleveland Indians – 1, Houston Astros – 3 | Minute Maid Park | 3:12 | 43,520 |
| 3 | October 8 | Houston Astros – 11, Cleveland Indians – 3 | Progressive Field | 4:02 | 37,252 |

== Boston vs. New York ==
This was the fourth postseason meeting between the storied rivals and their first meeting in the ALDS. The Yankees previously won the 1999 ALCS and 2003 ALCS, while the Red Sox won the 2004 ALCS. This was just the 11th postseason match-up to feature two 100-win teams.

=== Game 1 ===
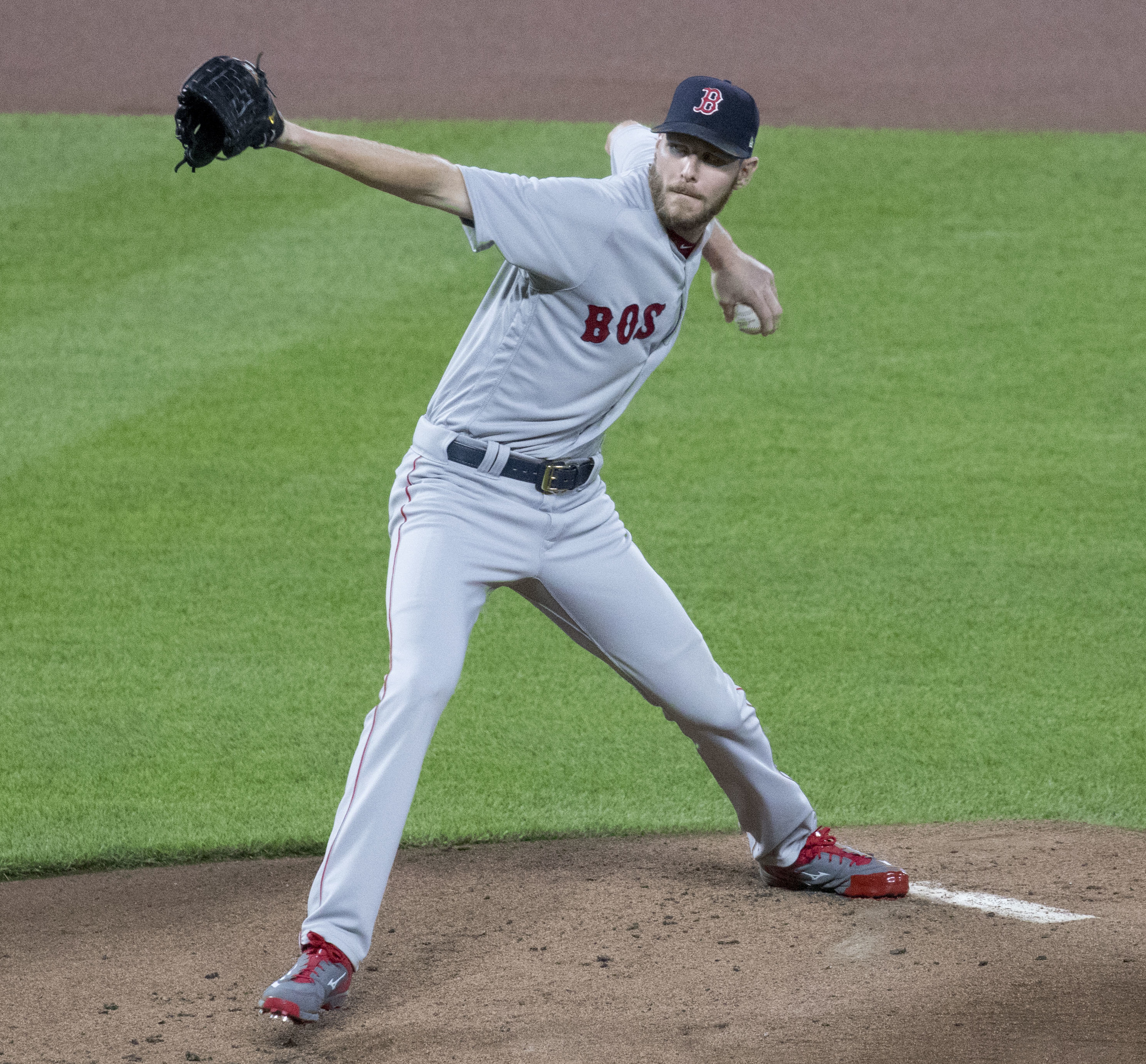
Chris Sale got the Game 1 win for Boston

October 5, 2018 7:32 pm (EDT) at Fenway Park in Boston, Massachusetts, 54 °F (12 °C), partly cloudy
| Team | 1 | 2 | 3 | 4 | 5 | 6 | 7 | 8 | 9 | R | H | E |
|---|---|---|---|---|---|---|---|---|---|---|---|---|
| New York | 0 | 0 | 0 | 0 | 0 | 2 | 1 | 0 | 1 | 4 | 10 | 0 |
| Boston | 3 | 0 | 2 | 0 | 0 | 0 | 0 | 0 | X | 5 | 8 | 0 |
WP: Chris Sale (1–0) LP: J. A. Happ (0–1) Sv: Craig Kimbrel (1); Home runs: NYY: Aaron Judge (1); BOS: J. D. Martinez (1); Attendance: 39,059; Boxscore

The ceremonial first pitch was thrown by former Red Sox outfielder Trot Nixon. Boston took an early lead, as J. D. Martinez hit a three-run home run in the bottom of the first inning. The lead grew to 5–0 in the bottom of the third, on a double, bunt single, single, and sacrifice fly. The Yankees scored twice in the top of the sixth, on three singles and a fielder's choice. Red Sox reliever Brandon Workman prevented more damage by striking out Gleyber Torres with the bases loaded and two outs. New York added an additional run in the top of the seventh, with two singles, a walk, and a fielder's choice; Boston reliever Matt Barnes allowed only one run after the Yankees has the bases loaded with nobody out. Aaron Judge led off the top of the ninth with a home run off of Boston closer Craig Kimbrel, but Kimbrel then struck out the next three batters to secure the 5–4 Red Sox victory.

=== Game 2 ===
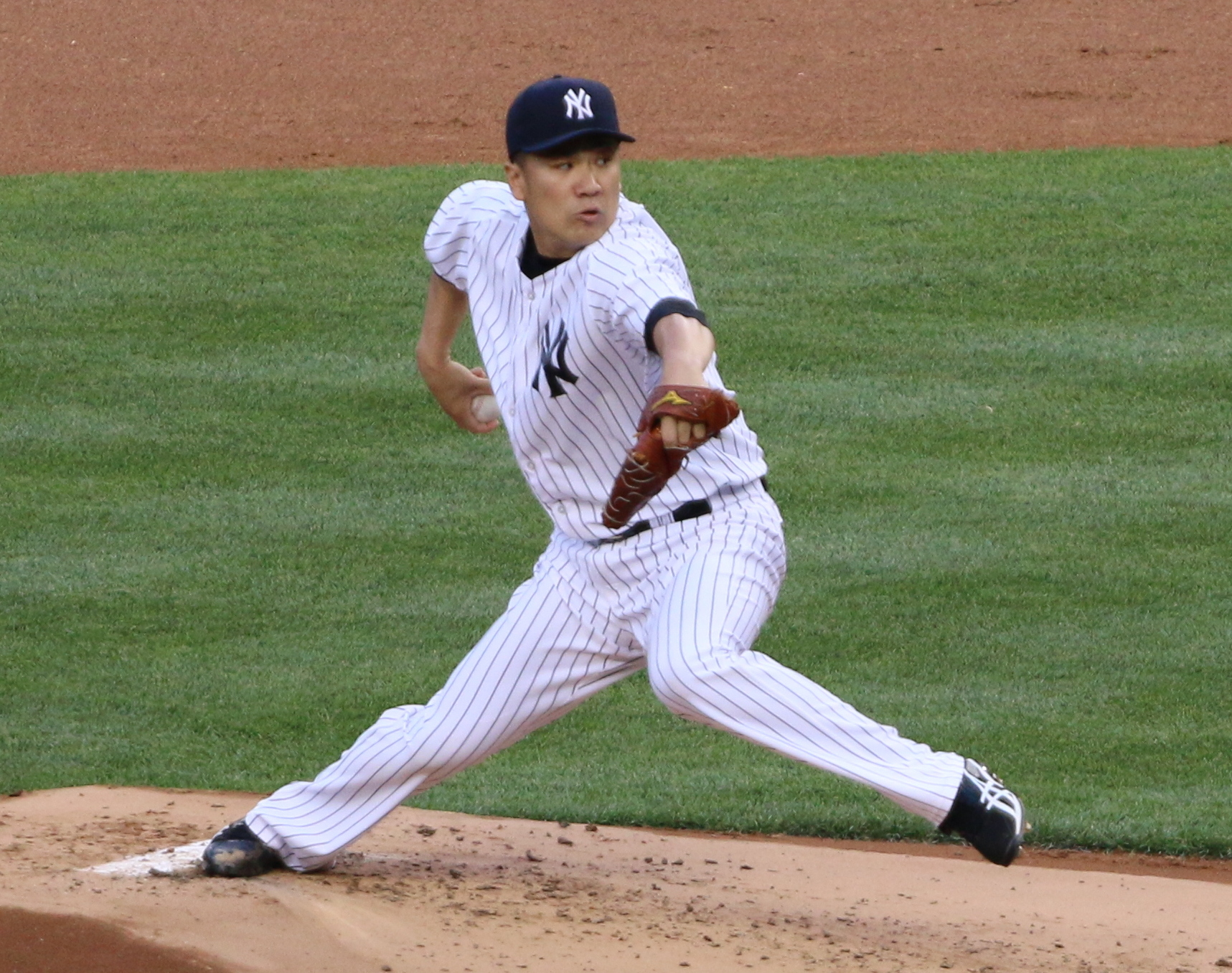
Game 2 winning pitcher Masahiro Tanaka

October 6, 2018 8:15 pm (EDT) at Fenway Park in Boston, Massachusetts, 62 °F (17 °C), cloudy
| Team | 1 | 2 | 3 | 4 | 5 | 6 | 7 | 8 | 9 | R | H | E |
|---|---|---|---|---|---|---|---|---|---|---|---|---|
| New York | 1 | 2 | 0 | 0 | 0 | 0 | 3 | 0 | 0 | 6 | 8 | 0 |
| Boston | 0 | 0 | 0 | 1 | 0 | 0 | 1 | 0 | 0 | 2 | 5 | 1 |
WP: Masahiro Tanaka (1–0) LP: David Price (0–1); Home runs: NYY: Aaron Judge (2), Gary Sánchez 2 (2); BOS: Xander Bogaerts (1); Attendance: 39,151; Boxscore

The ceremonial first pitch was thrown by Steve Horgan of the Boston Police Department, who gained notoriety as the "bullpen cop" during Game 2 of the 2013 ALCS. A home run by Aaron Judge in the first inning gave New York an early 1–0 lead. In the second inning, Gary Sánchez homered, and Boston starter David Price gave up a pair of two-out walks followed by an RBI single from Andrew McCutchen, ending Price's outing after 1 2/3 innings, having allowed three runs on three hits. Xander Bogaerts' home run in the bottom of the fourth reduced the Yankees' lead to 3–1. A three-run homer by Sánchez in the top of the seventh, his second of the game, doubled New York's score to 6–1. In the bottom of the seventh, a single by Mitch Moreland and an RBI double by Ian Kinsler got Boston within four runs, 6–2. The Red Sox were unable to score again, with Yankees' relievers Zach Britton and Aroldis Chapman getting the final six outs. New York starter Masahiro Tanaka pitched five innings, allowing one run on three hits and getting the win, tying the series at one all.

=== Game 3 ===
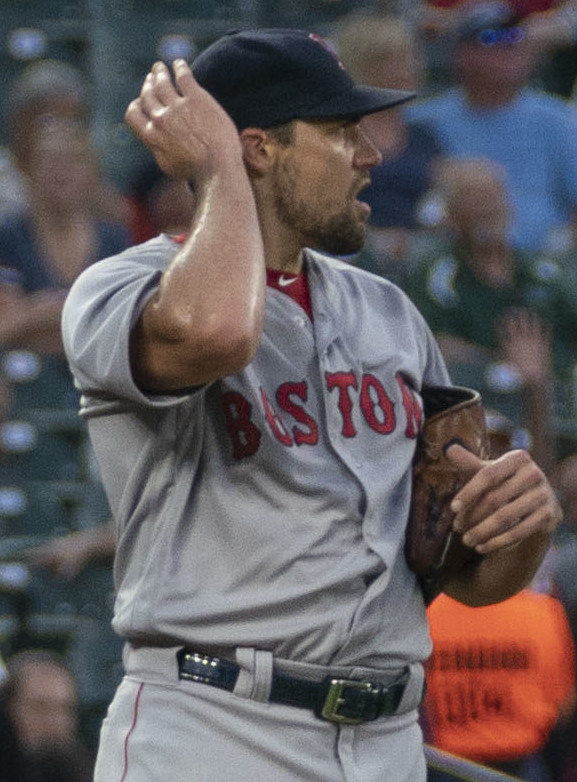
Boston starter Nathan Eovaldi got the win in Game 3.

October 8, 2018 7:40 pm (EDT) at Yankee Stadium in Bronx, New York, 66 °F (19 °C), drizzle
| Team | 1 | 2 | 3 | 4 | 5 | 6 | 7 | 8 | 9 | R | H | E |
|---|---|---|---|---|---|---|---|---|---|---|---|---|
| Boston | 0 | 1 | 2 | 7 | 0 | 0 | 1 | 3 | 2 | 16 | 18 | 0 |
| New York | 0 | 0 | 0 | 1 | 0 | 0 | 0 | 0 | 0 | 1 | 5 | 0 |
WP: Nathan Eovaldi (1–0) LP: Luis Severino (0–1); Home runs: BOS: Brock Holt (1); NYY: None; Attendance: 49,657; Boxscore

Boston got on the board in the top of the second inning, with Rafael Devers scoring from third on a two-out infield single by Christian Vázquez. The lead was extended to 3–0 in the third, with the Red Sox getting two runs on two singles, a sacrifice fly, another single, and a fielder's choice. Boston broke the game open in the fourth, sending 11 men to the plate and getting seven runs on six hits, as Yankees starter Luis Severino was pulled for Lance Lynn who in turn was relieved by Chad Green. Brock Holt had two hits in the inning, while Andrew Benintendi drove in three runs with a bases clearing double. The Yankees got one run back in the bottom of the fourth, on two singles and a fielder's choice. Boston made it 11–1 in the top of the seventh, on a J. D. Martinez RBI single, then 14–1 in the top of the eighth, getting three runs on a total of four hits, a walk, and a wild pitch. Yankees catcher Austin Romine pitched the top of the ninth inning, allowing a two-run homer to Holt, who completed the first postseason cycle in Major League history. Red Sox starter Nathan Eovaldi pitched seven innings, allowing one run on five hits and getting the win. Yankees starter Luis Severino pitched three innings, allowing six runs on seven hits and taking the loss. First base umpire Ángel Hernández had three calls overturned in the first four innings of the game. The defeat marks the Yankees' worst loss in postseason history.

=== Game 4 ===
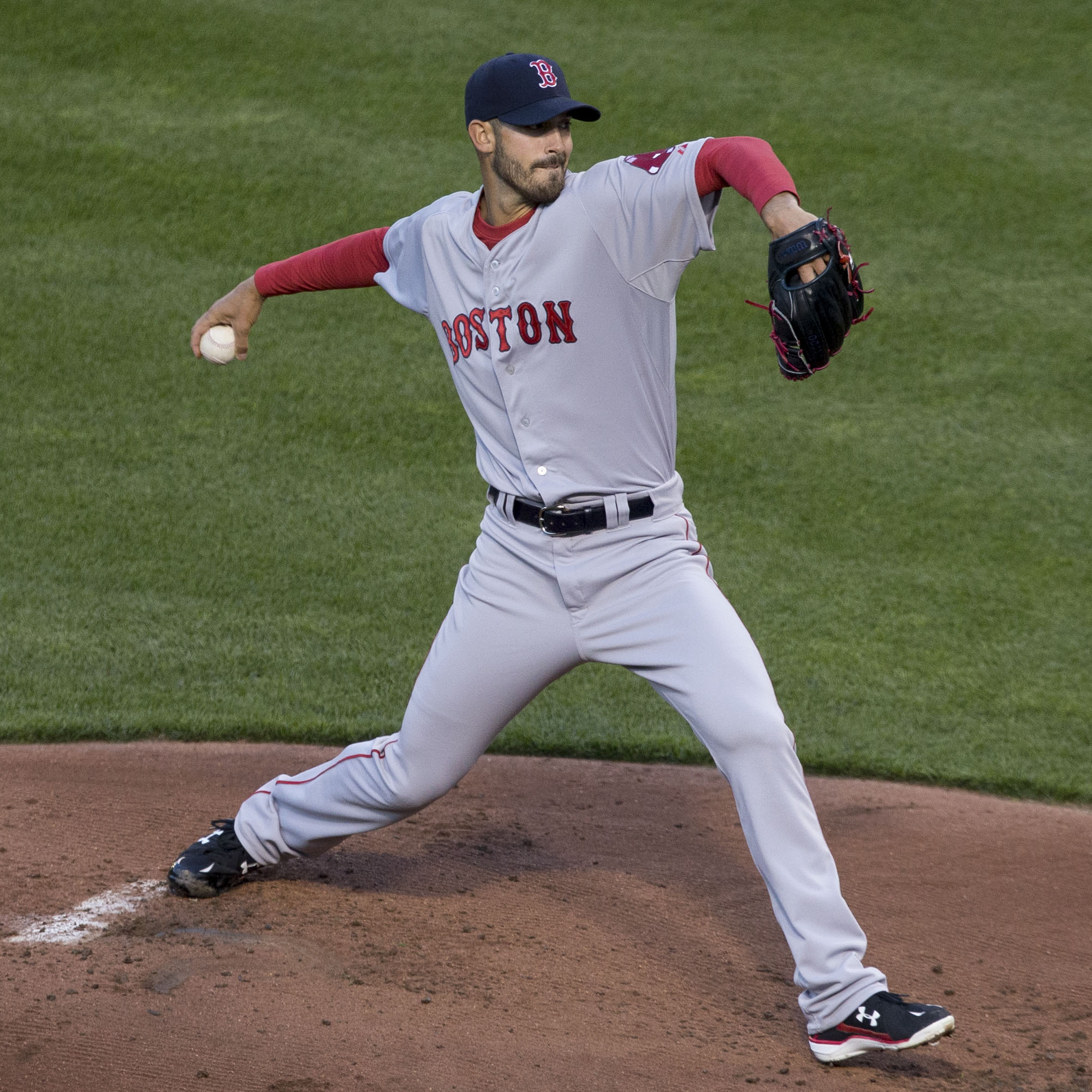
Boston starter Rick Porcello got the win in Game 4, sending the Red Sox to the ALCS.

October 9, 2018 8:07 pm (EDT) at Yankee Stadium in Bronx, New York, 72 °F (22 °C), clear
| Team | 1 | 2 | 3 | 4 | 5 | 6 | 7 | 8 | 9 | R | H | E |
|---|---|---|---|---|---|---|---|---|---|---|---|---|
| Boston | 0 | 0 | 3 | 1 | 0 | 0 | 0 | 0 | 0 | 4 | 8 | 0 |
| New York | 0 | 0 | 0 | 0 | 1 | 0 | 0 | 0 | 2 | 3 | 5 | 1 |
WP: Rick Porcello (1–0) LP: CC Sabathia (0–1) Sv: Craig Kimbrel (2); Home runs: BOS: Christian Vázquez (1); NYY: None; Attendance: 49,641; Boxscore

The ceremonial first pitch was thrown by former Yankee Bucky Dent. Boston took a 3–0 lead in the top of the third inning, on a hit by pitch, single, J. D. Martinez sacrifice fly, Ian Kinsler RBI double, and an Eduardo Núñez RBI single. A Christian Vázquez home run in the fourth extended the lead to 4–0. New York got a run back in the bottom of the fifth, on two hits followed by a sacrifice fly from Brett Gardner. Boston's Game 1 starting pitcher, Chris Sale, made a relief appearance in the bottom of the eighth, retiring the side in order. Red Sox closer Craig Kimbrel entered to pitch the bottom of the ninth inning, allowing a leadoff walk to Aaron Judge followed by a single by Didi Gregorius, bringing the tying run to the plate. Kimbrel struck out Giancarlo Stanton, but walked Luke Voit to load the bases, and hit Neil Walker to force in a run. Gary Sánchez worked a full count before hitting a sacrifice fly that scored Gregorius from third. Gleyber Torres then grounded out, ending the game; the call was confirmed by video replay. Boston starter Rick Porcello allowed one run off of four hits in five innings for the win. New York starter CC Sabathia allowed three runs off of five hits in three innings, taking the loss.

=== Composite line score ===
2018 ALDS (3–1): Boston Red Sox defeated New York Yankees.

| Team | 1 | 2 | 3 | 4 | 5 | 6 | 7 | 8 | 9 | R | H | E |
|---|---|---|---|---|---|---|---|---|---|---|---|---|
| New York Yankees | 1 | 2 | 0 | 1 | 1 | 2 | 4 | 0 | 3 | 14 | 28 | 1 |
| Boston Red Sox | 3 | 1 | 7 | 9 | 0 | 0 | 2 | 3 | 2 | 27 | 39 | 1 |
Total attendance: 177,508 Average attendance: 44,377

== Houston vs. Cleveland ==
This was the first postseason meeting between the Astros and Indians.

=== Game 1 ===
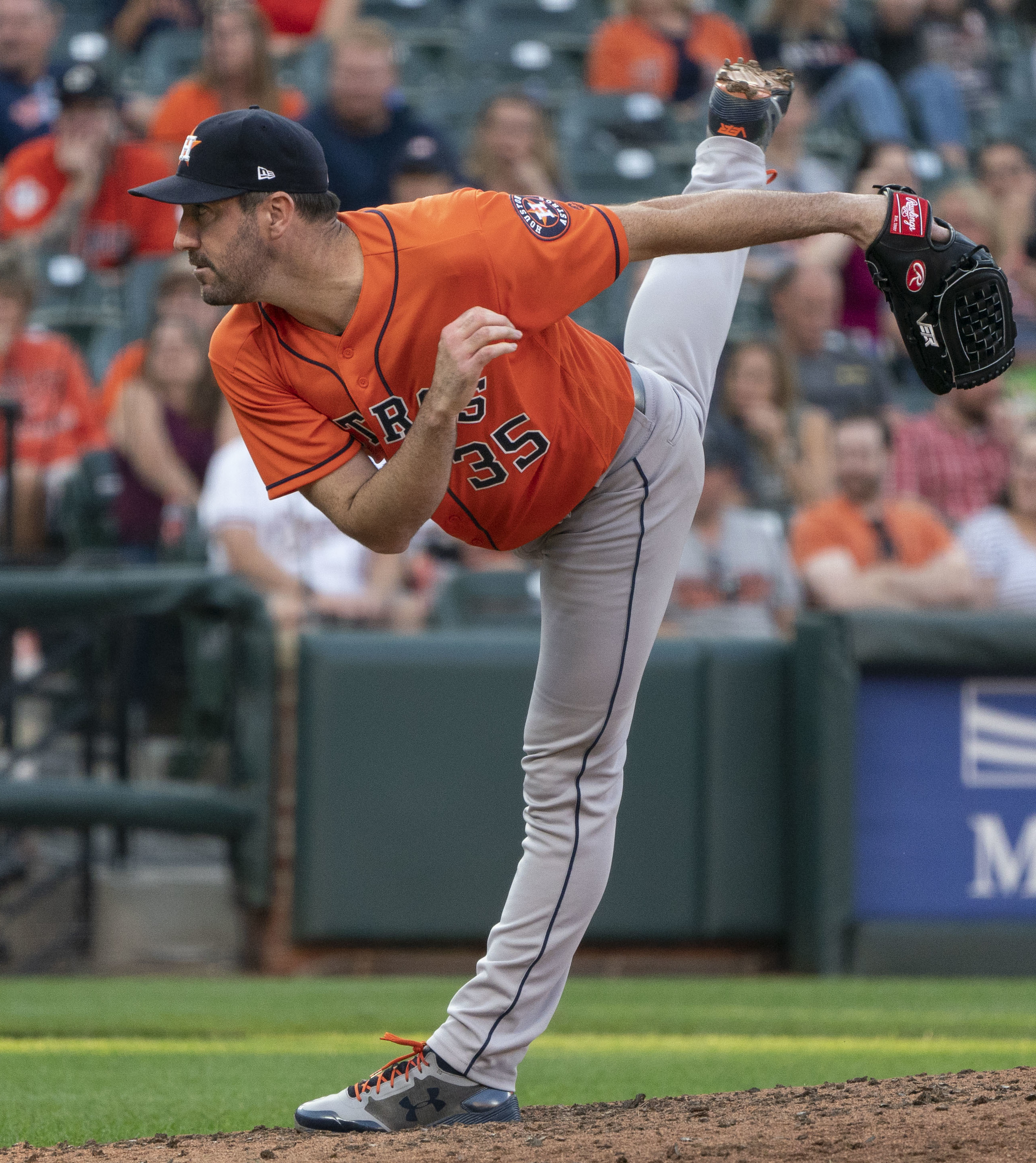
Game 1 winning pitcher Justin Verlander

October 5, 2018 1:05 pm (CDT) at Minute Maid Park in Houston, Texas, 73 °F (23 °C), roof closed
| Team | 1 | 2 | 3 | 4 | 5 | 6 | 7 | 8 | 9 | R | H | E |
|---|---|---|---|---|---|---|---|---|---|---|---|---|
| Cleveland | 0 | 0 | 0 | 0 | 0 | 2 | 0 | 0 | 0 | 2 | 3 | 0 |
| Houston | 0 | 0 | 0 | 2 | 2 | 0 | 2 | 1 | X | 7 | 12 | 0 |
WP: Justin Verlander (1–0) LP: Corey Kluber (0–1); Home runs: CLE: None; HOU: Alex Bregman (1), George Springer (1), Jose Altuve (1), Martin Maldonado (1); Attendance: 43,514; Boxscore

Former Astros pitcher Mike Scott, the 1986 NLCS MVP and Cy Young Award winner, threw the ceremonial first pitch. The defending World Series champion Astros began their title defense in strong fashion as Justin Verlander threw 5 1/3 innings with 7 strikeouts and 2 earned runs, holding the Indians hitless until the 6th inning. He and Corey Kluber traded hitless innings through the 3rd, before Alex Bregman led off the bottom of the 4th with a home run while Josh Reddick added an RBI single to bring the score to 2–0. George Springer and Jose Altuve hit back to back home runs in the bottom of the 5th and ended Kluber's day after 4 2/3 innings. After throwing five innings of no-hit ball, the Indians chased Verlander in the 6th after loading the bases. Ryan Pressly came in relief allowing Yan Gomes to score on a wild pitch and Francisco Lindor on a José Ramírez groundout before striking out Edwin Encarnación to end the threat and keep the score at 4–2. Martin Maldonado homered and Bregman drove in his second run of the day in the 7th while Reddick added another RBI single in the 8th to bring the score to 7–2. Roberto Osuna closed the door in the 9th to give the Astros a dominant Game 1 victory. Springer's home run tied him with Carlos Beltrán for the club record for most consecutive postseason games with a home run, with five. Springer had four in a row in the 2017 World Series.

=== Game 2 ===
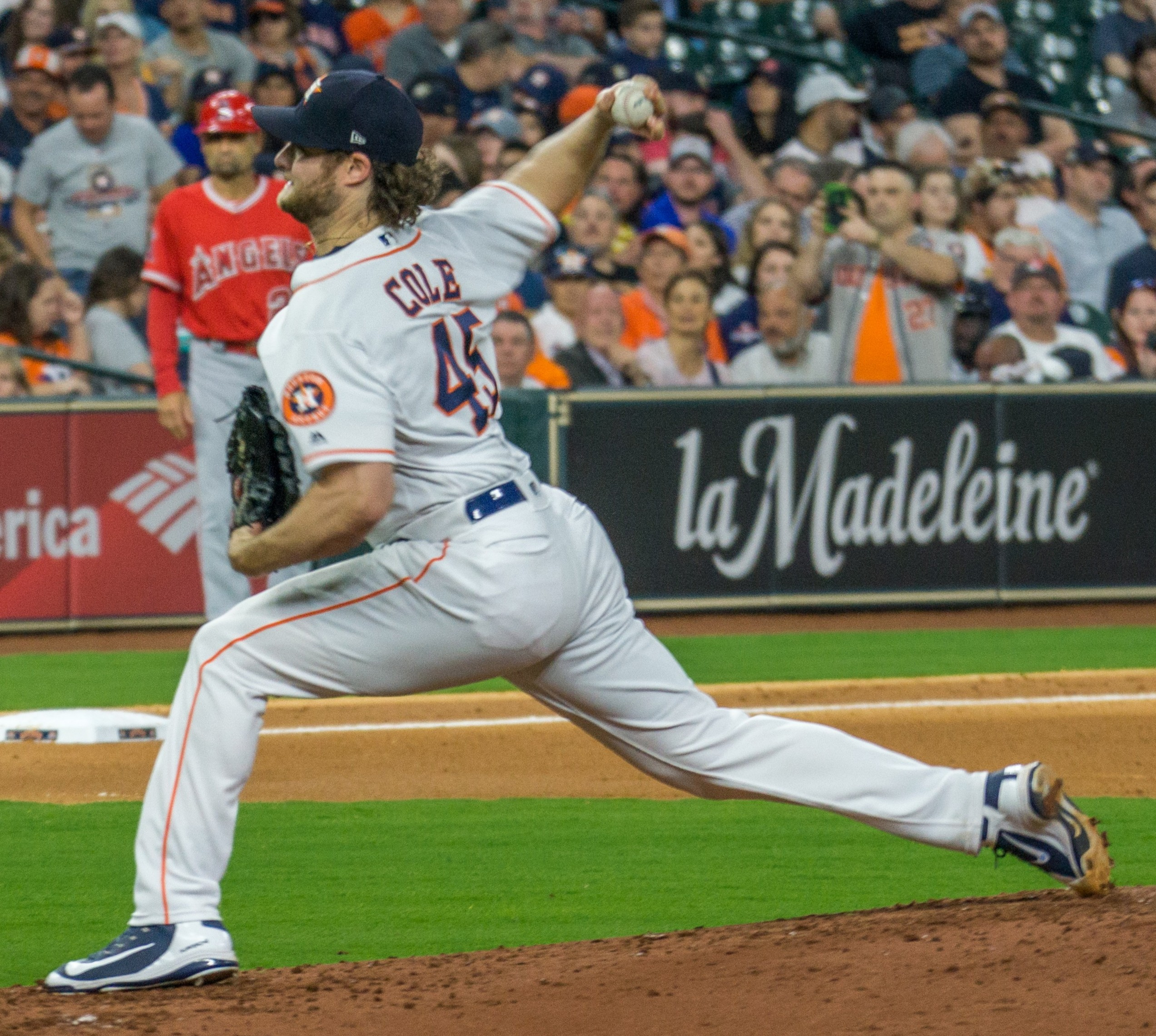
Gerrit Cole, was the Game 2 winning pitcher.

October 6, 2018 3:37 pm (CDT) at Minute Maid Park in Houston, Texas, 73 °F (23 °C), roof closed
| Team | 1 | 2 | 3 | 4 | 5 | 6 | 7 | 8 | 9 | R | H | E |
|---|---|---|---|---|---|---|---|---|---|---|---|---|
| Cleveland | 0 | 0 | 1 | 0 | 0 | 0 | 0 | 0 | 0 | 1 | 3 | 0 |
| Houston | 0 | 0 | 0 | 0 | 0 | 2 | 1 | 0 | X | 3 | 9 | 0 |
WP: Gerrit Cole (1–0) LP: Carlos Carrasco (0–1) Sv: Roberto Osuna (1); Home runs: CLE: Francisco Lindor (1); HOU: Alex Bregman (2); Attendance: 43,520; Boxscore

Three-time Astros All-Star and 2005 NLCS MVP Roy Oswalt threw the ceremonial first pitch. Hoping to even the series before returning home, Cleveland struck first and took a 1–0 lead in the top of the third inning, on a home run by Francisco Lindor. In the bottom of the sixth, an infield single and walk followed by a Marwin González double gave Houston a 2–1 lead. A home run by Alex Bregman in the seventh inning extended Houston's lead to 3–1. With two outs in the top of the ninth inning, a walk to Edwin Encarnación brought Josh Donaldson to the plate as the tying run, but closer Roberto Osuna got him to fly out, securing Game 2 for the Astros. Houston starter Gerrit Cole struck out 12 and allowed just one run in seven innings for the win, while Indians starter Carlos Carrasco gave up six hits and two runs in 5 1/3 innings and took the loss. Cole became only the second pitcher in playoff history to strikeout at least 12 batters without allowing a walk, following Tom Seaver's 13 strikeout-no walk performance in the 1973 NLCS. Osuna recorded a four-out save for his third career postseason save, and first with the Astros.

=== Game 3 ===
October 8, 2018 1:30 pm (EDT) at Progressive Field in Cleveland, Ohio, 85 °F (29 °C), partly cloudy
| Team | 1 | 2 | 3 | 4 | 5 | 6 | 7 | 8 | 9 | R | H | E |
|---|---|---|---|---|---|---|---|---|---|---|---|---|
| Houston | 0 | 0 | 0 | 0 | 1 | 0 | 3 | 6 | 1 | 11 | 13 | 0 |
| Cleveland | 0 | 0 | 1 | 0 | 1 | 0 | 0 | 0 | 1 | 3 | 7 | 3 |
WP: Collin McHugh (1–0) LP: Trevor Bauer (0–1); Home runs: HOU: George Springer 2 (3), Carlos Correa (1); CLE: Francisco Lindor (2); Attendance: 37,252; Boxscore

Cleveland took a 1–0 lead in the third inning, on two singles followed by a sacrifice bunt and a sacrifice fly. The teams traded home runs in the fifth inning, by George Springer of the Astros and then Francisco Lindor of the Indians. Houston went ahead, 4–2, with three runs in the seventh from two singles, a fielder's choice, error, walk, and a two-RBI double by Marwin González. The Astros added six runs in the eighth on a homer by Springer, a double, two walks, RBI single, bases loaded wild pitch, and a three-run homer by Carlos Correa. Houston extended their lead to 11–2 in the ninth, on a walk, balk, ground out, and RBI single by Alex Bregman. Cleveland got one run in the last of the ninth, with Edwin Encarnación scoring from third on a wild pitch, followed by Melky Cabrera grounding out to first for the 11–3 final and to give the Astros a series sweep. Houston starter Dallas Keuchel had a no decision after allowing two runs on four hits in five innings; he was relieved by Collin McHugh who pitched two innings without allowing a hit and got the win. Cleveland starter Mike Clevinger also had a no decision after allowing three hits and one run in five innings; he was relieved by Trevor Bauer who allowed four hits and three runs (two earned) in 1 1/3 innings and took the loss.

With their victory in Game 3, the Astros earned a postseason sweep for the first time in franchise history, advancing to the ALCS to meet the winner of the Red Sox and Yankees series. This marks the second time in franchise history that the Astros have reached back-to-back Championship Series; the first time was in 2004 and 2005, when the team played in the National League. The Indians were swept in the postseason for the first time since 1954, and were eliminated in the ALDS for the second straight year. They were also eliminated from the postseason at home for the third straight year.

According to Jeff Passan of Yahoo Sports, the Cleveland Indians warned the Boston Red Sox that a man representing the Houston Astros might try to steal signs from their dugout in the ALCS. Passan reported that the same man, Astros' intern Kyle McLaughlin, was found taking cell phone video of the Indians' dugout during the Astros' and Indians' ALDS matchup. After the 2019 season, MLB punished the Astros for illicitly stealing their opponents' signs and relaying it to their hitters throughout 2017 and 2018 seasons.

=== Composite line score ===
2018 ALDS (3–0): Houston Astros defeated Cleveland Indians.

| Team | 1 | 2 | 3 | 4 | 5 | 6 | 7 | 8 | 9 | R | H | E |
|---|---|---|---|---|---|---|---|---|---|---|---|---|
| Cleveland Indians | 0 | 0 | 2 | 0 | 1 | 2 | 0 | 0 | 1 | 6 | 13 | 3 |
| Houston Astros | 0 | 0 | 0 | 2 | 3 | 2 | 6 | 7 | 1 | 21 | 34 | 0 |
Total attendance: 124,286 Average attendance: 41,429

== See also ==
- 2018 National League Division Series
- Red Sox–Yankees rivalry
