= 2011 National League Division Series =

American baseball games

Teams
Team (Wins)		Manager	Season
St. Louis Cardinals (3)		Tony La Russa	90–72 (.556), GB: 6
Philadelphia Phillies (2)		Charlie Manuel	102–60 (.630), GA: 13
- Dates: October 1–7
- Television: TBS
- TV announcers: Dick Stockton, Bob Brenly (Games 1–4), Ron Darling (Game 5), and John Smoltz (Game 5)
- Radio: ESPN
- Radio announcers: Jon Sciambi and Chris Singleton
- Umpires: Jerry Layne (crew chief), Chris Guccione, Jerry Meals, Ángel Hernández, Gary Cederstrom, Chad Fairchild

Teams
Team (Wins)		Manager	Season
Milwaukee Brewers (3)		Ron Roenicke	96–66 (.593), GA: 6
Arizona Diamondbacks (2)		Kirk Gibson	94–68 (.580), GA: 8
- Dates: October 1–7
- Television: TBS (Games 1–2, 4–5); TNT (Game 3)
- TV announcers: Victor Rojas and Joe Simpson
- Radio: ESPN
- Radio announcers: Dave O'Brien (Games 1–2), Chris Berman (Games 3–5), Rick Sutcliffe (Games 1–4), and Buck Martinez (Game 5)
- Umpires: Joe West (crew chief), Ron Kulpa, Alfonso Marquez, Bruce Dreckman, Jeff Kellogg, James Hoye

The 2011 National League Division Series (abbreviated NLDS) were two best-of-five playoffs comprising the first round of the National League side in Major League Baseball's 2011 postseason, played to determine the participating teams in the 2011 National League Championship Series. Three divisional winners and a fourth team—a wild card—played in two series. TBS televised all games in the United States (except Game 3 of the Brewers–Diamondbacks series, which aired on TNT due to scheduling conflicts with the ALDS). The regular season finished on September 28, with the National League playoffs beginning October 1.

Under MLB's playoff format, no two teams from the same division were matched up in the Division Series, regardless of whether their records would normally indicate such a matchup. Home field advantage went to the team with the better regular-season record with the exception of the wild card team, which defers home field advantage regardless of record. The matchups were:

- (1) Philadelphia Phillies (NL East champions) vs. (4) St. Louis Cardinals (Wild Card qualifier): Cardinals won the series, 3–2.
- (2) Milwaukee Brewers (NL Central champions) vs. (3) Arizona Diamondbacks (NL West champions): Brewers won the series, 3–2.

The Phillies and Cardinals played against each other in the postseason for the first time. The Brewers and Diamondbacks also met for the first time, having both joined the National League in 1998—Arizona as an expansion team and Milwaukee in a move from the American League after the AL expanded by adding the Tampa Bay Rays. The Brewers-Diamondbacks series was also notable as the first postseason series played between two teams in ballparks with retractable roofs.

This is the first time since the strike-shortened 1981 season that both National League Division Series matchups went to a deciding Game 5 (it happened to the American League in 2001).

The Cardinals defeated the Brewers in the NLCS and went on to win the 2011 World Series, defeating the American League champion Texas Rangers.

== Participants ==
- On September 14, the Philadelphia Phillies became the first team to qualify for the NLDS (additionally they had the best record in MLB with 102 wins and 60 losses, 13 games over Atlanta in the National League East (NL East) at the end of the 2011 season, as well as the first team in either league to qualify for the postseason). On September 17, the Phillies clinched the NL East title for the fifth consecutive season.
- On September 23, after a win over the Marlins and the Cardinals' loss to the Cubs, the Milwaukee Brewers clinched the NL Central title. It was the Brewers' first NL Central title since joining the division in 1998, their first of any kind since winning the 1982 American League pennant, when they won the AL East title, and their first playoff berth since 2008.
- Also on September 23, the Arizona Diamondbacks clinched the NL West, their first time since 2007.
- On September 28, after making up over a 10-game deficit in the final month of the season and going into the season's last day tied with the Braves for the last playoff berth, the St. Louis Cardinals clinched the NL Wild Card by beating the Astros while the Braves lost in extra innings to the Phillies.

== Matchups ==
=== Philadelphia Phillies vs. St. Louis Cardinals ===
St. Louis won the series, 3–2.

Game	Date	Score	Location	Time	Attendance
1	October 1	St. Louis Cardinals – 6, Philadelphia Phillies – 11	Citizens Bank Park	2:55	46,480
2	October 2	St. Louis Cardinals – 5, Philadelphia Phillies – 4	Citizens Bank Park	3:22	46,575
3	October 4	Philadelphia Phillies – 3, St. Louis Cardinals – 2	Busch Stadium	3:13	46,914
4	October 5	Philadelphia Phillies – 3, St. Louis Cardinals – 5	Busch Stadium	2:34	47,071
5	October 7	St. Louis Cardinals – 1, Philadelphia Phillies – 0	Citizens Bank Park	2:29	46,530

=== Milwaukee Brewers vs. Arizona Diamondbacks ===
Milwaukee won the series, 3–2.

Game	Date	Score	Location	Time	Attendance
1	October 1	Arizona Diamondbacks – 1, Milwaukee Brewers – 4	Miller Park	2:44	44,122
2	October 2	Arizona Diamondbacks – 4, Milwaukee Brewers – 9	Miller Park	3:29	44,066
3	October 4	Milwaukee Brewers – 1, Arizona Diamondbacks – 8	Chase Field	3:01	48,312
4	October 5	Milwaukee Brewers – 6, Arizona Diamondbacks – 10	Chase Field	3:25	38,830
5	October 7	Arizona Diamondbacks – 2, Milwaukee Brewers – 3 (10)	Miller Park	3:41	44,028

== Philadelphia vs. St. Louis ==
=== Game 1 ===
October 1, 2011 5:07 pm (EDT) at Citizens Bank Park in Philadelphia, Pennsylvania 63 °F (17 °C), overcast
Team	1	2	3	4	5	6	7	8	9	R	H	E
St. Louis	3	0	0	0	0	0	0	0	3	6	7	1
Philadelphia	0	0	0	1	0	5	3	2	X	11	14	0
WP: Roy Halladay (1–0) LP: Kyle Lohse (0–1); Home runs: STL: Lance Berkman (1); PHI: Ryan Howard (1), Raúl Ibañez (1); Attendance: 46,480; Boxscore

The Cardinals struck first on Lance Berkman's three-run home run off Phillies' starter Roy Halladay in the first inning. The Phillies fought back on Shane Victorino's RBI single in the fourth, and Ryan Howard put Philadelphia ahead with a second-deck three-run shot in the sixth. Two batters later, Raúl Ibañez hit a two-run homer to give the Phillies a three-run lead. Ibañez's homer was the decisive blow to Cardinals' starter Kyle Lohse, who was out of the game after 5 1/3 innings. Next inning, the Phillies loaded the bases on three singles with no outs off of Marc Rzepczynski, who was then relieved by Mitchell Boggs. After Hunter Pence hit into a force out at home, Howard's sacrifice fly followed by RBI singles by Victorino and Ibañez made it 9–3 Phillies. Next inning, Jimmy Rollins walked with two outs, then Chase Utley doubled before both men scored on Pence's single. In the top of the ninth, the Cardinals scored three runs on Adron Chambers' RBI single and Skip Schumaker's two-run double off reliever Michael Stutes, but closer Ryan Madson struck out Jon Jay and Matt Holliday to seal the win for the Phillies.

=== Game 2 ===
October 2, 2011 8:37 pm (EDT) at Citizens Bank Park in Philadelphia, Pennsylvania 50 °F (10 °C), mostly cloudy w/ rain late
Team	1	2	3	4	5	6	7	8	9	R	H	E
St. Louis	0	0	0	3	0	1	1	0	0	5	13	0
Philadelphia	3	1	0	0	0	0	0	0	0	4	6	0
WP: Octavio Dotel (1–0) LP: Cliff Lee (0–1) Sv: Jason Motte (1); Attendance: 46,575; Boxscore

The Phillies scored early on RBI singles by Ryan Howard and Raúl Ibañez in the first inning. Hunter Pence's single in the second scored Jimmy Rollins and gave the Phillies a 4–0 lead. With Cliff Lee on the mound, who was 7–2 in the postseason and 3–0 in the League Division Series, and Chris Carpenter, who pitched on three days' rest, was out after three innings, things did not look good for the Cardinals. However, the offense started to do their work in the fourth, when Ryan Theriot, Jon Jay, and Rafael Furcal each knocked in one run for the Cardinals. Jay singled again in the sixth to tie the game and Albert Pujols' RBI single in the seventh gave the Cardinals the lead. The Cardinals' bullpen picked up where Carpenter left off, combined to throw six innings of scoreless, one-hit ball. Cardinals closer Jason Motte pitched a four-out save to seal the win.

This was the third consecutive postseason loss for Lee going back to the 2010 World Series.

=== Game 3 ===
October 4, 2011 4:07 pm (CDT) at Busch Stadium in St. Louis, Missouri 81 °F (27 °C), sunny
Team	1	2	3	4	5	6	7	8	9	R	H	E
Philadelphia	0	0	0	0	0	0	3	0	0	3	7	0
St. Louis	0	0	0	0	0	0	1	0	1	2	12	0
WP: Cole Hamels (1–0) LP: Jaime García (0–1) Sv: Ryan Madson (1); Home runs: PHI: Ben Francisco (1); STL: None; Attendance: 46,914; Boxscore

After six scoreless innings from both starting pitchers, the Phillies sent Ben Francisco to pinch-hit for Cole Hamels, following an intentional walk to Carlos Ruiz, and a single by Shane Victorino. Francisco homered off the second pitch from Jaime García 405 feet (123 m) over the left center wall to give the Phillies a 3–0 lead.

In the sixth inning, a squirrel—soon to become more famous the next day under the name "Rally Squirrel"—appeared in the outfield, causing a brief interruption in play. The incident was even immortalized in a promo for the "Legends are Born in October" ad campaign, complete with the background music set to the ads from that campaign, Tinie Tempah's "Written in the Stars."

In the bottom of the seventh, the Cardinals added a run with Allen Craig scoring off an RBI single by David Freese. In the bottom of the eighth, the Cardinals were able to load the bases with one out, thanks to singles by Ryan Theriot, pinch hitter Matt Holliday, and Rafael Furcal. However, the Cardinals were not able to capitalize, with Craig grounding out into an inning ending double play. In the bottom of the ninth, Pujols led off with his third double of the game. Following a flyout by Lance Berkman and a ground out by Freese (which sent Pujols to third), Yadier Molina singled to center, bringing Pujols home, and making it a one-run game. Theriot then grounded out to second to end the game, giving the Phillies a 2–1 series lead.

=== Game 4 ===
October 5, 2011 5:07 pm (CDT) at Busch Stadium in St. Louis, Missouri 80 °F (27 °C), mostly clear
Team	1	2	3	4	5	6	7	8	9	R	H	E
Philadelphia	2	0	0	0	0	0	0	1	0	3	7	1
St. Louis	1	0	0	2	0	2	0	0	X	5	6	0
WP: Edwin Jackson (1–0) LP: Roy Oswalt (0–1) Sv: Jason Motte (2); Home runs: PHI: None; STL: David Freese (1); Attendance: 47,071; Boxscore

Before the second-largest crowd (47,071) in Busch Stadium history, the Cardinals staved off elimination with a 5–3 home victory over the Phillies. The Phils struck first with two runs in the first inning off Edwin Jackson. Jimmy Rollins doubled and scored on a triple by Chase Utley, who came home on Hunter Pence's single to make it 2–0. The Cards cut the lead to 2–1 in the bottom half when Lance Berkman doubled in Skip Schumaker. Berkman advanced to third when Shane Victorino misplayed the ball, but was unable to score. Meanwhile, Jackson settled down after the shaky first, allowing only two hits in the next five innings. The Cards took the lead on David Freese's two-run double in the fourth, scoring Berkman and Matt Holliday to make it 3–2, Cardinals.

In the fifth inning, the Rally Squirrel again appeared, crossing home plate as Oswalt was delivering a pitch to Skip Schumaker. The pitch was called a ball, but Oswalt and manager Charlie Manuel argued for "no pitch", which appeal was denied by home-plate umpire Ángel Hernández. Schumaker then flied out, but the Rally Squirrel went on to become a cause célèbre in St. Louis.

St. Louis extended their lead to 5–2 in the sixth when Freese hit a two-run homer to the grassy area in center field. After that, the Cards' bullpen took it the rest of the way. Arthur Rhodes pitched a 1–2–3 seventh, but Fernando Salas ran into trouble in the eighth, allowing a run on a wild pitch to cut the Cardinals' lead to 5–3. The Phillies would bring the tying run to the plate in the form of St. Louis native Ryan Howard later in the inning, but Marc Rzepczynski struck out Howard to escape the jam. In the bottom half, Albert Pujols batted against Brad Lidge, a pitcher whom Pujols victimized with a three-run home run in the 2005 playoffs, when Lidge was with Houston. Lidge, however, got Pujols to fly out to right. Jason Motte got the save by retiring the Phillies in order in the ninth. Center fielder Jon Jay made a sliding catch of a line drive by former Cardinal Plácido Polanco for the final out.

=== Game 5 ===
October 7, 2011 8:37 pm (EDT) at Citizens Bank Park in Philadelphia, Pennsylvania 58 °F (14 °C), clear
Team	1	2	3	4	5	6	7	8	9	R	H	E
St. Louis	1	0	0	0	0	0	0	0	0	1	6	1
Philadelphia	0	0	0	0	0	0	0	0	0	0	3	2
WP: Chris Carpenter (1–0) LP: Roy Halladay (1–1); Attendance: 46,530; Boxscore

The Cardinals struck first in the first inning when leadoff batter Rafael Furcal hit a triple and Skip Schumaker followed with a double, but no other runs were scored with Roy Halladay laboring through over 30 pitches in that inning. In the bottom of the fourth, the Phillies had runners at the corners with two outs. On a 3–2 count, batter Raúl Ibañez got a cutter down the middle and hit it deep to right field. The TV camera focused on the right field stands, but would move down to show Lance Berkman making the catch at the warning track. Halladay was lifted for a pinch-hitter in the eighth after giving up six hits and one run, throwing 126 pitches, 87 for strikes. He walked one (intentional to Albert Pujols), striking out seven. Ryan Madson replaced Halladay in the ninth. Chris Carpenter got Ryan Howard to ground out to second, capping off a three-hit shutout. Howard tore his Achilles' tendon on that final play. This was considered the unofficial end of the Phillies mini-dynasty, which started in 2007.

This was only the third "winner-take-all" game in postseason history to end in a 1–0 score (following Game 7 of the 1962 World Series and Game 7 of the 1991 World Series)

This was the Phillies’ most recent postseason game until 2022.

=== Composite box ===
2011 NLDS (3–2): St. Louis Cardinals over Philadelphia Phillies

Team	1	2	3	4	5	6	7	8	9	R	H	E
St. Louis Cardinals	5	0	0	5	0	3	2	0	4	19	44	2
Philadelphia Phillies	5	1	0	1	0	5	6	3	0	21	37	3
Total attendance: 233,570 Average attendance: 46,714

== Milwaukee vs. Arizona ==
=== Game 1 ===
October 1, 2011 1:07 pm (CDT) at Miller Park in Milwaukee, Wisconsin 73 °F (23 °C), roof closed
Team	1	2	3	4	5	6	7	8	9	R	H	E
Arizona	0	0	0	0	0	0	0	1	0	1	4	0
Milwaukee	0	0	0	1	0	1	2	0	X	4	8	0
WP: Yovani Gallardo (1–0) LP: Ian Kennedy (0–1) Sv: John Axford (1); Home runs: AZ: Ryan Roberts (1); MIL: Prince Fielder (1); Attendance: 44,122; Boxscore

Game 1 featured both teams' top winning pitchers, with the Diamondbacks' 21-game winner Ian Kennedy going against the Brewers' 17-game winner Yovani Gallardo. The Diamondbacks threatened in the 1st inning, where Willie Bloomquist was thrown out at home by Ryan Braun on a potential RBI single by Justin Upton. After that, Gallardo settled down, pitching 8 stellar innings, tying a franchise postseason record with 9 strikeouts. The Brewers scored first in the 4th when Braun scored on a Jerry Hariston sacrifice fly, and then scored again in the 6th when Yuniesky Betancourt tripled and was then driven in by a single by Jonathan Lucroy. In the 7th inning, with two outs, Braun doubled for the Brewers, with Prince Fielder coming up. Diamondbacks manager Kirk Gibson went to talk to Kennedy and allowed Kennedy to pitch to Fielder with first base open. This was considered by some observers an eerie case of déjà vu for Gibson, who had been in the same situation at the plate in the 1984 World Series when Goose Gossage chose to pitch to Gibson with 1st base open, and gave up a home run to Gibson. The same thing happened for Fielder, who hit the second pitch he saw from Kennedy out for a 2-run homer, giving the Brewers a comfortable 4–0 lead. Ryan Roberts broke up Gallardo's shutout with a home run in the 8th, but Brewers closer John Axford finished off the Diamondbacks in the 9th, giving the Brewers the 4–1 win and the first win of the series.

=== Game 2 ===
October 2, 2011 4:07 pm (CDT) at Miller Park in Milwaukee, Wisconsin 73 °F (23 °C), roof closed
Team	1	2	3	4	5	6	7	8	9	R	H	E
Arizona	0	1	0	1	2	0	0	0	0	4	10	1
Milwaukee	2	0	2	0	0	5	0	0	X	9	13	1
WP: Takashi Saito (1–0) LP: Daniel Hudson (0–1); Home runs: AZ: Paul Goldschmidt (1), Chris Young (1), Justin Upton (1); MIL: Ryan Braun (1); Attendance: 44,066; Boxscore

The Brewers started Game 2 on a high note with Ryan Braun hitting a two-run homer in the first inning off of Daniel Hudson, but starter Zack Greinke, pitching on three days' rest, allowed a leadoff home run to Paul Goldschmidt in the second; In the third, Braun doubled with two outs, then scored on Prince Fielder's single before Fielder scored on Rickie Weeks's triple. Greinke gave up a solo home run to Chris Young in the fourth, then a two-run home run to Justin Upton in the fifth and left with the game in a 4–4 tie. In the sixth, Jerry Hairston doubled with one out. Brad Ziegler relieved Hudson and committed a balk that let Hairston move to third, then walked Yuniesky Betancourt. Hairston scored on Jonathan Lucroy's bunt single and an error put runners on second and third. After Mark Kotsay was intentionally walked to load the bases, Corey Hart's single scored a run, Nyjer Morgan's single scored two more, and Braun's single scored another to give the Brewers a 9–4 lead. The Brewers bullpen pitched scoreless ball for the last four innings in helping the team gain a 2–0 series lead.

=== Game 3 ===
October 4, 2011 6:37 pm (PST) at Chase Field in Phoenix, Arizona 73 °F (23 °C), roof closed
Team	1	2	3	4	5	6	7	8	9	R	H	E
Milwaukee	0	0	1	0	0	0	0	0	0	1	3	1
Arizona	2	0	1	0	5	0	0	0	X	8	11	0
WP: Josh Collmenter (1–0) LP: Shaun Marcum (0–1); Home runs: MIL: Corey Hart (1); AZ: Paul Goldschmidt (2); Attendance: 48,312; Boxscore

With support from the sellout crowd, the Diamondbacks' offense finally broke out in Game 3. The D-backs scored two runs in the first on Miguel Montero's RBI double and Paul Goldschmidt's RBI single, one in the third on Montero's RBI single, and five in the fifth on Goldschmidt's grand slam and Ryan Roberts' RBI single. Backed up by the offense, starter Josh Collmenter hurled seven innings, allowing two hits, one earned run, and two walks while striking out six. The only run for the Brewers came from Corey Hart's solo homer in the top of the third. With the 8–1 lead, relievers David Hernandez and J. J. Putz pitched the eighth and the ninth each to seal the win.

=== Game 4 ===
October 5, 2011 6:37 pm (PST) at Chase Field in Phoenix, Arizona 73 °F (23 °C), roof closed
Team	1	2	3	4	5	6	7	8	9	R	H	E
Milwaukee	1	1	1	0	0	1	0	2	0	6	11	1
Arizona	5	0	2	0	0	1	2	0	X	10	13	0
WP: Micah Owings (1–0) LP: Randy Wolf (0–1); Home runs: MIL: Carlos Gómez (1); AZ: Ryan Roberts (2), Chris Young 2 (3), Aaron Hill (1); Attendance: 38,830; Boxscore

The Diamondbacks knocked in ten runs—eight on four homers—to force a decisive Game 5.

The Brewers scored early in the first inning on Ryan Braun's RBI double. But the D-backs fought back in the bottom half on Ryan Roberts' grand slam and Chris Young's solo homer. The Brewers scored two more runs on George Kottaras' RBI groundout in the second and Jerry Hairston Jr.'s RBI double in the third. The D-backs answered with Collin Cowgill's two-run single in the bottom of the third. Both starters were ineffective as each pitched only three innings, but the two homers allowed by Randy Wolf made the most difference, putting the Brewers into an early 7–3 hole.

The Brewers continued scoring on Corey Hart's sacrifice fly in the sixth and Carlos Gómez's two-run homer. But the D-backs also scored three more runs on Aaron Hill's solo home run in the sixth and Young's two-run homer, his second of the night, in the seventh. Micah Owings got the win for the D-backs with two scoreless innings of relief, and closer J. J. Putz pitched a scoreless ninth to seal the win for the D-backs.

=== Game 5 ===
October 7, 2011 4:07 pm (CDT) at Miller Park in Milwaukee, Wisconsin 73 °F (23 °C), roof closed
Team	1	2	3	4	5	6	7	8	9	10	R	H	E
Arizona	0	0	1	0	0	0	0	0	1	0	2	10	0
Milwaukee	0	0	0	1	0	1	0	0	0	1	3	7	0
WP: John Axford (1–0) LP: J. J. Putz (0–1); Home runs: AZ: Justin Upton (2); MIL: None; Attendance: 44,028; Boxscore

The Diamondbacks struck first with Justin Upton's solo home run in the top of the third inning, but the Brewers immediately tied the game in the bottom of the fourth with a Jerry Hairston Jr. sacrifice fly scoring Nyjer Morgan. The Brewers took the lead in the bottom of the sixth when Yuniesky Betancourt hit an RBI single scoring Ryan Braun. In the top of the ninth John Axford came in on a save situation, but blew it when Willie Bloomquist hit an RBI bunt single scoring Gerardo Parra. Axford was able to escape with a pair of fielder's choice outs to Upton and Henry Blanco. The game went into extra innings after David Hernandez pitched a 1–2–3 ninth. In the top of the 10th Axford pitched a 1–2–3 inning of his own, and then with J. J. Putz pitching in the bottom of the 10th, Morgan hit the walk-off RBI single scoring Carlos Gómez to give Milwaukee the victory.

It was the Brewers' first playoff series win since beating the California Angels 3–2 in the 1982 ALCS, and also made the NLCS for the first time, having moved to the National League in 1998.

This was only the second Game 5 of a Division Series to require extra innings, after Game 5 of the 1995 American League Division Series, which saw the Seattle Mariners defeat the New York Yankees, courtesy of The Double.

=== Composite box ===
2011 NLDS (3–2): Milwaukee Brewers over Arizona Diamondbacks

Team	1	2	3	4	5	6	7	8	9	10	R	H	E
Milwaukee Brewers	3	1	4	2	0	8	2	2	0	1	23	42	3
Arizona Diamondbacks	7	1	4	1	7	1	2	1	1	0	25	48	1
Total attendance: 219,358 Average attendance: 43,872

== See also ==
- 2011 American League Division Series
