= Ángel Hernández (umpire) =

Cuban-American baseball umpire (born 1961)

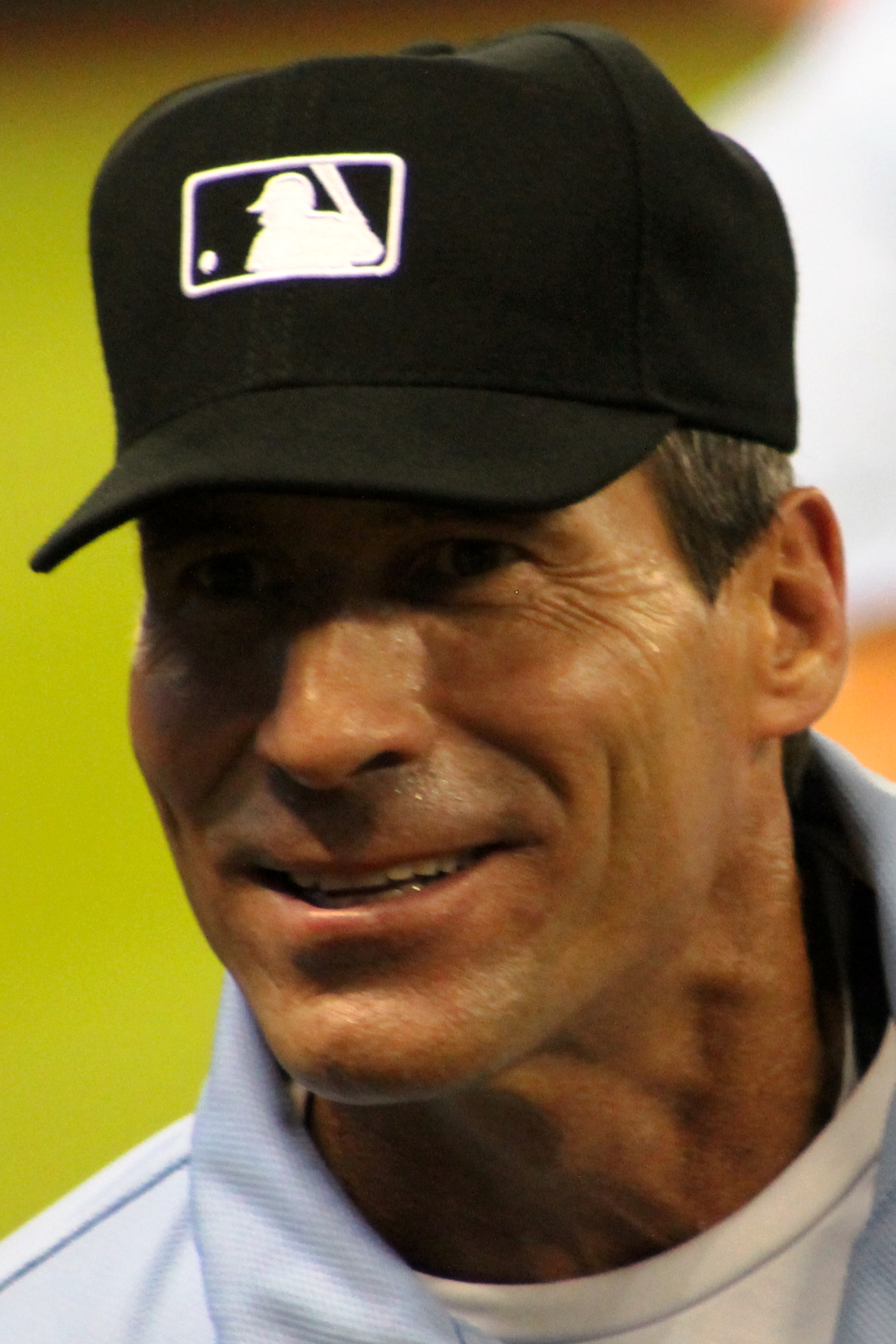
- Hernández in 2015
- Born: August 26, 1961 (age 65); Havana, Cuba

MLB debut
- May 23, 1991

Last appearance
- May 9, 2024

Career highlights and awards
- Special Assignments: All-Star Game (1999, 2009, 2017); Division Series (1997, 1998, 2002, 2005, 2009, 2011, 2012, 2015, 2017, 2018, 2020, 2021); League Championship Series (2000, 2001, 2003, 2004, 2007, 2008, 2010, 2016); World Series (2002, 2005); World Baseball Classic (2023)

Ángel Hernández (born August 26, 1961) is a Cuban-American retired professional baseball umpire. He worked in the National League from 1991 to 1999 and worked throughout Major League Baseball (MLB) from 2000 until his retirement in May 2024. Hernández was involved in several controversial incidents and was widely criticized by players, coaches, and fans throughout his career.

Hernández umpired eight League Championship Series, three All-Star Games, the 2023 World Baseball Classic, and the 2002 and 2005 World Series. In July 2017, Hernández filed an unsuccessful federal lawsuit against MLB, alleging that racial discrimination kept him from being promoted to crew chief and from umpiring future World Series games.

== Early life ==
Hernández was born in Havana, Cuba. At 14 months old, his family moved to Hialeah, Florida, where he grew up and began playing and umpiring in the Khoury League as a teenager; his father directed the local league.

== Umpiring career ==
Hernández began umpiring in the Florida State League in 1981, where he earned $900 per month (equivalent to $3,200 in 2025), moved to the Carolina League in 1984, was promoted to the Southern League in 1986 and earned a raise to $1,800 per month and then reached the top rung of Minor League Baseball in the American Association in 1988, where he was paid $2,200 per month (equivalent to $6,000 in 2025).

In May 1991, he earned his first call-up to the Major Leagues as a substitute for a full-time umpire. Fifty-seven of his friends and family came to the ballpark to watch his debut.

Hernández umpired in the World Series in 2002 and 2005 and the All-Star Game in 1999, 2009, and 2017. He officiated in seven League Championship Series (2000, 2001, 2003, 2004, 2007, 2010, 2016), and in 12 League Division Series (1997, 1998, 2002, 2005, 2009, 2011, 2012, 2015, 2017, 2018, 2020, 2021). Hernández worked Game 7 of the 2008 ALCS as an injury fill-in for Derryl Cousins. For the second half of the 2011 baseball season, Hernández was moved from the umpiring crew of Joe West to the crew of Gerry Davis.

Hernández wore number 5 while in the National League, but the number was taken by Dale Scott when the umpires were consolidated under MLB in 2000, so Hernández took number 55. After Scott retired in 2017, Hernández regained his number 5 for the 2018 season.

In 1999, Hernández was ranked 31st out of 36 National League umpires in the Major League Baseball Players Association survey. He was retained for the 2000 season ahead of 13 of his National League colleagues, which the Philadelphia Inquirer termed one of the "surprises" of the 1999 purge.

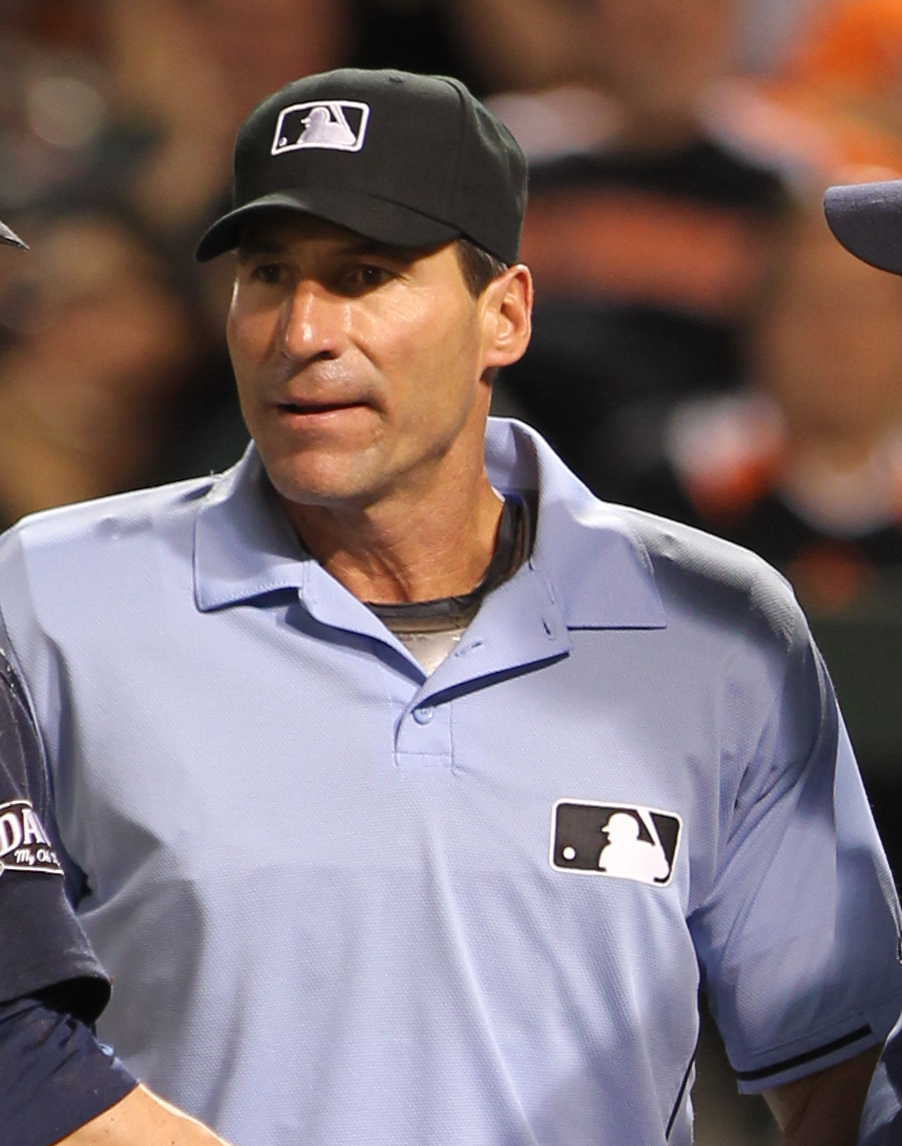
Hernández in 2011

In 2006 and 2011, he was listed as the third-worst baseball umpire in Sports Illustrated player polls. A 2010 ESPN survey showed that 22% of major league ballplayers asked identified Hernández as the worst umpire in the major leagues. In 2016, Hernández's lawsuit against MLB stated that MLB rated Hernández's accuracy behind the plate at 96.88 percent in 2016 (up from 92.19% in 2002), and said he did not miss any calls on the basepaths.

During the 2016, 2017, and 2018 seasons, Hernández's calls at first base were overturned in 14 out of 18 video reviews, for a 78% overturn rate, exceeding the 60% overturn rate for all first-base calls by all umpires during that time period.

On April 8, 2019, Boston University published a study on 11 seasons of Major League Baseball data, almost 4 million pitches analyzed, to determine the accuracy of balls and strikes called. The study found that Hernández performed stronger in 2018 than his average for 2008–2018. He averaged 19 incorrect calls a game, or 2.2 per inning. Even with this high error rate, compared to his peers, he performed better than others, escaping the 2018 Bottom 10 MLB list. During spring training 2019, Hernández claimed he gets four wrong calls per game. The BU study shows that his error rate is almost five times higher.

In 2020, after a dozen umpires elected to sit out the season as a result of the COVID-19 pandemic, Hernandez was made an interim crew chief.

The Sporting News journalist Tom Gatto wrote in 2020 that Hernández "has earned a reputation for being one of MLB's worst umpires". Andrew Mahoney, writing for The Boston Globe, reported that Hernández "has a reputation as one of baseball's worst umpires". Zach Braziller of The New York Post wrote that he was the "worst umpire in baseball".

In 2023, Hernandez worked a single game on April 3 before suffering a back injury. He remained sidelined until July 31, when he began a minor league rehab assignment. Despite working only ten MLB games in 2023, Sports Illustrated reported that Hernandez missed 161 calls, and his strike zone accuracy in the September 14 Pirates–Nationals game was the worst by any umpire in the last five years.

=== Notable games ===
Hernández was behind the plate for the final game at the original Yankee Stadium on September 21, 2008. He was umpiring at third base when Jered Weaver threw a no-hitter on May 2, 2012, and was also the third-base umpire on September 28, 2012, when Homer Bailey of the Cincinnati Reds no-hit the Pittsburgh Pirates. On May 18, 2021, Hernandez was the home plate umpire for Spencer Turnbull's no-hitter against the Seattle Mariners, the only time that he has been the home plate umpire for a no-hitter.

=== Incidents ===
In 1998, Hernández was behind the plate for a game between the New York Mets and the Atlanta Braves the day before the All-Star break. In the 11th inning, Braves runner Michael Tucker tagged up on a fly ball to left. Hernández ruled Tucker safe, but replays showed the throw to catcher Mike Piazza beat Tucker, and that Tucker had never touched home plate. After the game, Piazza said the call was the worst he had ever seen in his baseball career. Other Mets opined that Hernández may have been in a hurry to get the game over with so they could all start their break.

On August 7, 2001, Hernández was the home plate umpire for a game between the Chicago Cubs and the Colorado Rockies at Wrigley Field. In the bottom of the 6th inning, Hernández controversially called Cubs infielder Ron Coomer out at the plate. Former Chicago Bears defensive tackle Steve McMichael, who was visiting the Cubs television booth and who was the guest singer for Take Me Out to the Ball Game during the seventh-inning stretch, told those in attendance over the PA system that he would "have some speaks" with Hernández after the game, presumably because of Hernández's call against Coomer. A visibly angry Hernández was shown on camera glaring at McMichael from the field, muttering "son of a bitch." McMichael was subsequently ejected from the ballpark; it was initially thought that Hernández had ordered the ejection. It later emerged that crew chief Randy Marsh had ordered the ejection, threatening to stop the game unless McMichael was removed from the ballpark. Later, the umpires received an apology from then-Cubs general manager Andy MacPhail for McMichael's conduct.

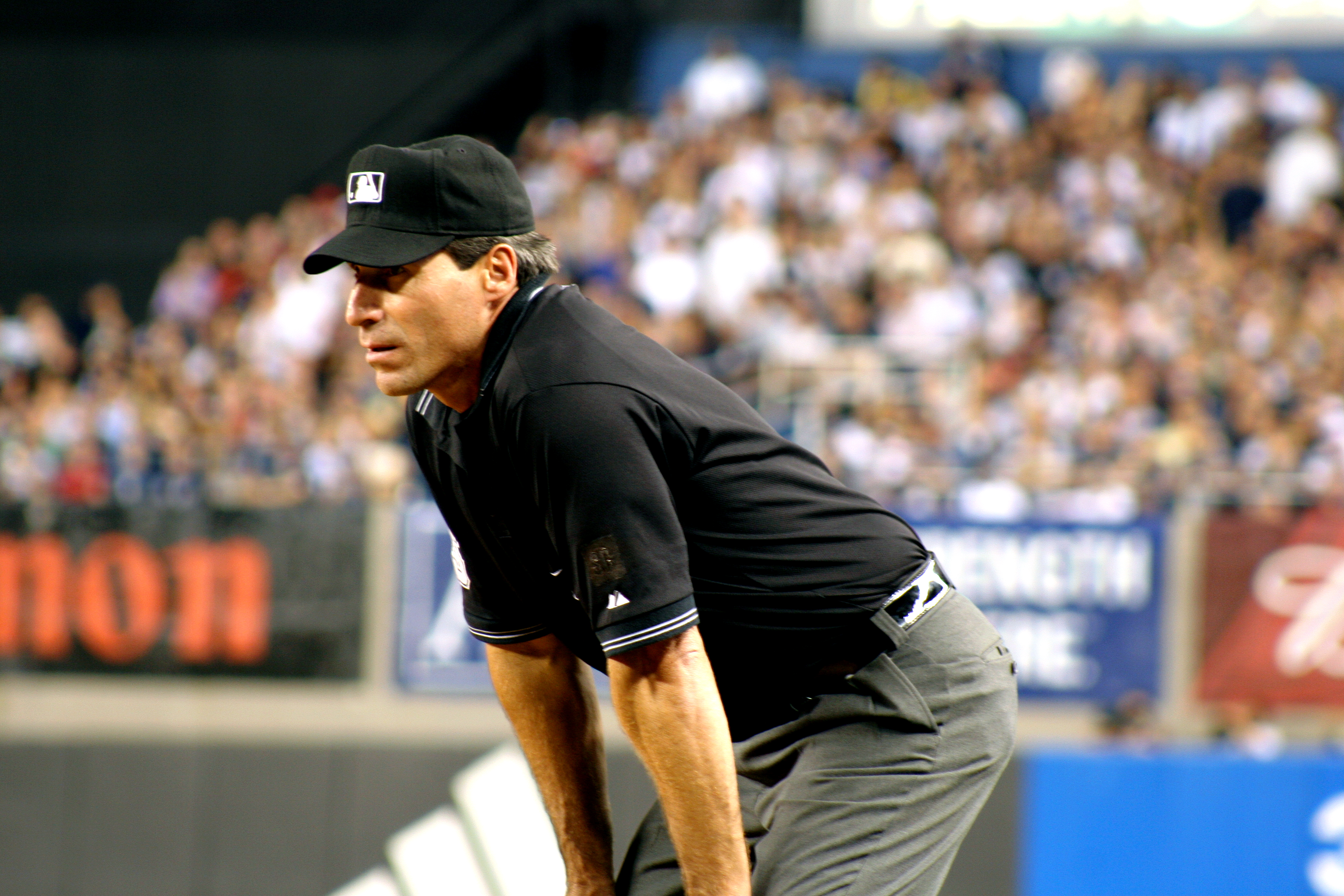
Hernández in 2007

On July 17, 2006, when Hernández served as the third-base umpire for a game between the Dodgers and Diamondbacks, he ejected Dodgers' first-base coach Mariano Duncan. When Duncan came out of the dugout to argue the ejection, he tossed his cap to the ground in anger. After Duncan was removed from the field, Hernández picked up the cap and tossed it to a fan in the stands. The next day, Duncan taped his cap to his head before delivering the Dodgers' lineup to the umpires. Duncan was suspended for two games and fined by Major League Baseball as a result of the incident.

On May 8, 2013, Hernández served as the crew chief for a game between the Oakland Athletics and the Cleveland Indians. In the ninth inning, he and two other umpires ruled a long hit by the Athletics' Adam Rosales was a double following a video review, although the ball hit a railing above the top of the wall. Oakland's manager Bob Melvin argued the call and Hernández ejected him. The Athletics lost the game 4–3. MLB later acknowledged that the hit should have been called a home run but said that it was too late to overturn it. Several umpires argued that the replay system did not provide clear enough pictures and the system was later changed.

In August 2017, Detroit Tigers second baseman Ian Kinsler was fined $10,000 by MLB for saying that Hernández was a bad umpire who "needs to find another job."

On October 8, 2018, Hernández was the first-base umpire for Game 3 of the 2018 American League Division Series between the Yankees and Red Sox. Four out of five plays that he called at first base which were submitted for video review were overturned. TBS analyst and Hall of Famer Pedro Martínez said after the game: "Angel was horrible. Don't get me going on Angel now. Major League Baseball needs to do something about Angel. It doesn't matter how many times he sues Major League Baseball. He's as bad as there is." Pitcher CC Sabathia said: "I don’t understand why he’s doing these games. ... He’s always bad. He’s a bad umpire." Hernández declined to comment after the game, a blowout win for the Red Sox, but MLB issued a statement through a spokesperson: "There were several very close calls at first base tonight and we are glad that instant replay allowed the umpiring crew to achieve the proper result on all of them."

MLB removed Hernández as acting crew chief after accusing him of eavesdropping on an MLB investigative call in July 2019, which focused on Hernández's 20-minute game delay due to umpire confusion over league rules. Hernández did not hang up his phone when his interview ended, and instead continued listening to the subsequent questioning of another umpire that he knew was intended to be separate. Joe Torre, MLB's chief baseball officer, wrote him: "Simply put, we find your asserted justifications for remaining on the line to be implausible, internally inconsistent, premised on facts that are incorrect and not credible.... we have concluded that you remained on the line in an effort to intentionally and deceptively eavesdrop on a confidential conversation in order to hear what [umpire] Hickox would say... This is an egregious offense." Hernández was also chastised for asking pitcher Homer Bailey for 11 autographed baseballs after Bailey's no-hitter, for making three incorrect calls that were later overturned on the basis of video replay in the first four innings of Game 3 of the 2018 ALDS, and for angrily throwing his headset during a different game when his call was overturned by replay.

=== Lawsuit ===
In July 2017, Hernández filed a federal lawsuit against MLB, alleging that racial discrimination led to his being overlooked for World Series games and crew chief promotions. He also cited a longstanding feud with Chief Baseball Officer Joe Torre, dating back to Torre's managerial career. Hernández asserted that before Torre's arrival in 2011, Hernández's evaluations were consistently positive, but since then evaluations had turned neutral or negative. Nearly a week after he filed the suit, Hernández was named to the 2017 All-Star Game; he was also selected as first-base umpire for the 2017 and 2018 American League Division Series. In September 2018, the case was moved from the United States District Court for the Southern District of Ohio to the United States District Court for the Southern District of New York in New York City, where Major League Baseball is headquartered.

In March 2021, United States District Judge J. Paul Oetken granted a summary judgment in MLB's favor, writing, "The court concludes that no reasonable juror could find that MLB's stated explanation is a pretext for discriminatory motive", and "The evidence shows beyond genuine dispute that an umpire's leadership and situation management carried the day in MLB's promotion decisions."

In August 2023, the 2nd U.S. Circuit Court of Appeals in Manhattan rejected Hernández's appeal.

=== Retirement ===
On May 27, 2024, Hernández announced his retirement after he reached a financial settlement with MLB. He umpired his final game on May 9.

== Personal life ==
Hernández is the father of two daughters with his wife, Maria.

In 2015, Hernández returned to Cuba for the first time since he left to spread the ashes of his father. A few months later, he returned to umpire the first game in the country involving an MLB team since 1999.

Hernández does charity work for disabled children, including hosting a celebrity golf tournament every year. He lives in Loxahatchee, Florida.

== See also ==
- List of Major League Baseball umpires (disambiguation)
