= Fredbird =

- Fredbird in 2014
- First appearance: April 6, 1979

In-universe information
- Species: Northern cardinal
- Gender: Male
- Occupation: Mascot
- Relatives: Louie (brother)

Fredbird is the official mascot for the St. Louis Cardinals major league baseball team. He is an anthropomorphic cardinal wearing the team's uniform. Fredbird can always be found entertaining young children during baseball games at Busch Stadium. His name is derived from "Redbird", a synonym for the cardinal bird and for the Cardinals themselves. Fredbird was introduced on April 6, 1979, by the Cardinals, then owned by Anheuser-Busch, to entertain younger fans at the games.

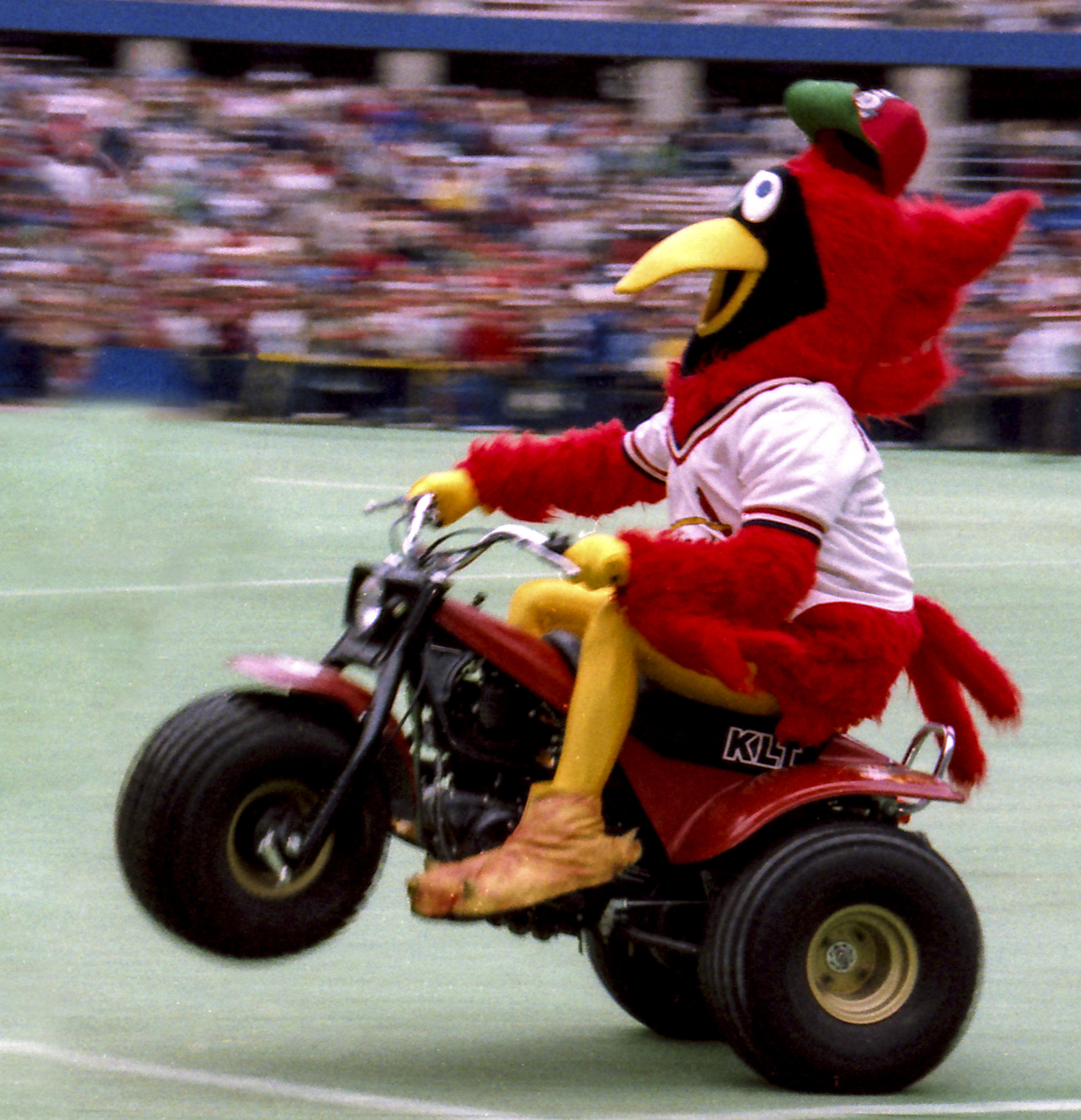
Fredbird in 1983.

He quickly became popular with fans for his dancing, habit of "beaking" the heads of supporters, and for throwing T-shirts into the stands. In later years, he has been joined by "Team Fredbird", a group of young women employed by the club who help him with his T-shirt toss and occasionally in other duties. He can also be seen rallying the crowd regularly during pregame on-field ceremonies, and, occasionally, he finds time to sit behind (or on top of) the dugout to get the crowd going. After every Cardinal home victory, Fredbird takes a flag with the team's logo onto the field and waves it around. He is one of baseball's best-known mascots, and he makes hundreds of appearances year-round in the St. Louis area. Fredbird can also be seen on television once a week on the Cardinals Kids TV show with former Cardinal Brad Thompson.

Fredbird was inducted into the National Mascot Hall of Fame in June 2025.

== Controversy ==
He came under slight controversy in 2015 when he was seen holding a sign saying "Police Lives Matter" when the Cardinals said that Fredbird was not involved in any sort of political activity. However, a man and a woman asking for a quick photo with Fredbird said that he was unaware of the sign. Eventually, the Cardinals asked the police association that had the sign to take the sign down.

== See also ==
- Rally Squirrel, who joined Fredbird as a secondary mascot during the 2011 postseason
- List of Major League Baseball mascots
