= Skip Schumaker =

American baseball player and coach (born 1980)

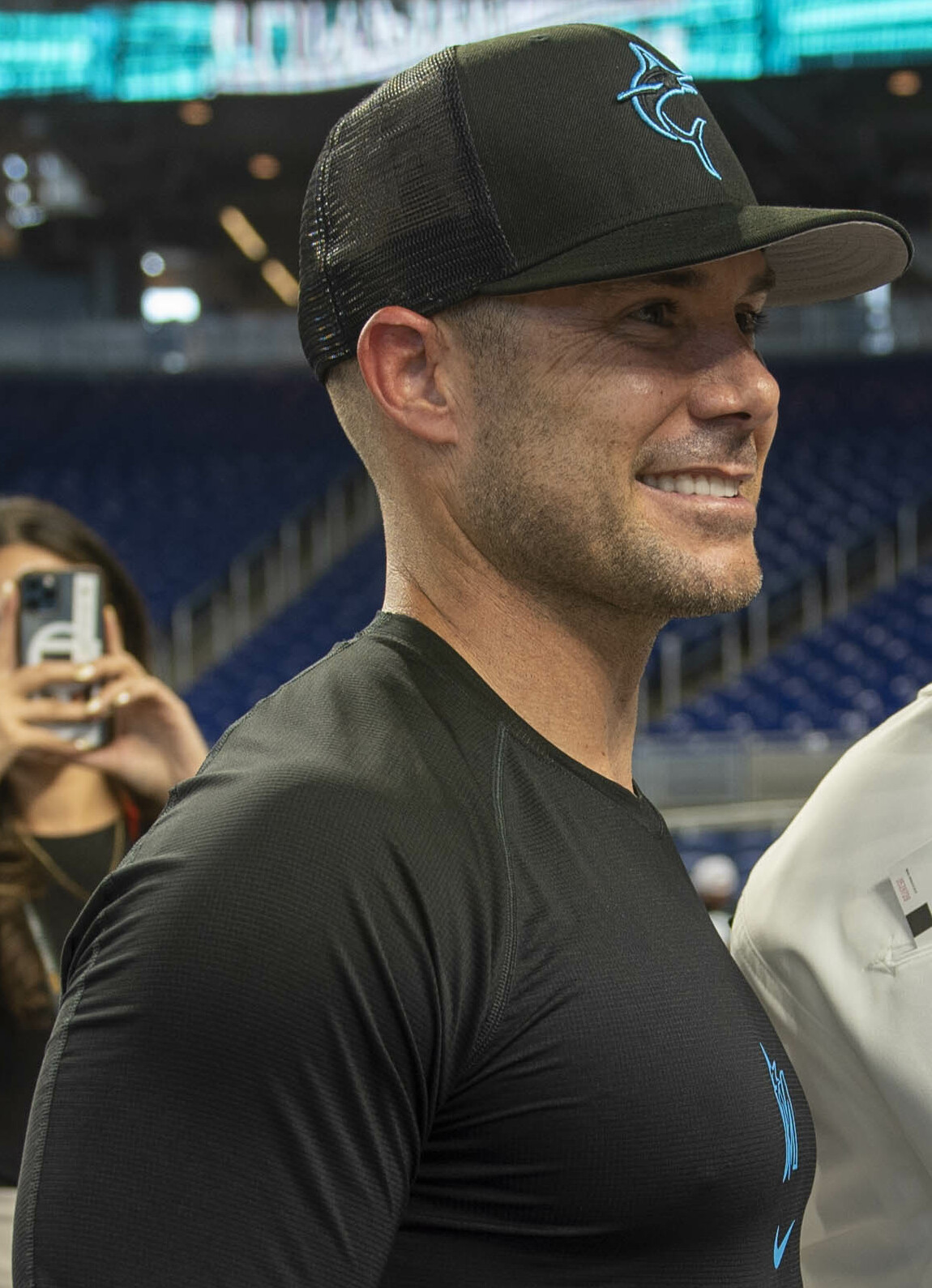
- Schumaker with the Miami Marlins in 2023

Texas Rangers – No. 55
- Outfielder / Second baseman / Manager
- Born: February 3, 1980 (age 46); Torrance, California, U.S.
- Batted: Left Threw: Right

MLB debut
- June 8, 2005, for the St. Louis Cardinals

Last MLB appearance
- October 4, 2015, for the Cincinnati Reds

MLB statistics (through June 30, 2026)
- Batting average: .278
- Home runs: 28
- Runs batted in: 284
- Managerial Record: 226–260
- Winning %: .463
- Stats at Baseball Reference
- Managerial record at Baseball Reference

Teams
- As player: St. Louis Cardinals (2005–2012); Los Angeles Dodgers (2013); Cincinnati Reds (2014–2015); As manager: Miami Marlins (2023–2024); Texas Rangers (2026–present); As coach: San Diego Padres (2018–2021); St. Louis Cardinals (2022)

Career highlights and awards
- World Series champion (2011); NL Manager of the Year (2023)

Jared Michael "Skip" Schumaker (/ˈʃuːmɑːkər/ SHOO-mah-kər; born February 3, 1980) is an American professional baseball manager and former outfielder and second baseman who currently serves as the manager of the Texas Rangers of Major League Baseball (MLB). He played in MLB for the St. Louis Cardinals, Los Angeles Dodgers, and Cincinnati Reds, and has previously managed for the Miami Marlins.

Schumaker made his MLB debut with the Cardinals in 2005 and was a member of the 2011 World Series championship team. After playing for the Cardinals through 2012, he played for the Dodgers and Reds before retiring after the 2015 season. He coached for the Padres and Cardinals, and then managed the Marlins from 2023 to 2024, winning the National League Manager of the Year Award in 2023. After joining the Texas Rangers as an advisor in 2025, he became their manager for the 2026 season.

== Early life and education ==
Schumaker graduated from Aliso Niguel High School in Aliso Viejo, California. In his first year of college, he attended Loyola Marymount University to play college baseball for the Loyola Marymount Lions in 1999. He started 11 games at shortstop and had a batting average of .238 over 27 games played, including two games in the NCAA Tournament. He transferred to the University of California, Santa Barbara to play college baseball for the UC Santa Barbara Gauchos. In 2001, his only year with regular playing time, Schumaker had 100 total hits for a batting average of an even .400, while recording 41 runs batted in (RBIs).

== Playing career ==
=== St. Louis Cardinals ===
==== Minor leagues ====
The St. Louis Cardinals selected Schumaker in the fifth round of the 2001 Major League Baseball draft.

Schumaker spent the remainder of 2001 with the short-season New Jersey Cardinals, and in 2002 he had 158 hits for the Potomac Cannons. His minor-league career advanced from Single-A in 2003 when he was promoted to the Tennessee Smokies, where he spent two full seasons. A .316 batting average in 2004 was enough to give him a shot with the Cardinals during spring training in 2005.

==== Major leagues ====
After spending the first two months of the season in with the Memphis Redbirds, Schumaker made his major-league debut on June 8 against the Boston Red Sox at Busch Stadium. Schumaker entered the game as a pinch-hitter for the pitcher, Chris Carpenter, and was struck out by David Wells. Schumaker remained with the club until June 14, failing to pick up a hit in five at-bats.

On August 10, Schumaker was called back up to the Cardinals and picked up his first major-league hit two days later in a pinch-hit appearance against the Chicago Cubs. In 2005, Schumaker batted .250 with one RBI over 27 games.

Schumaker hit his first Major League home run on April 5, 2006, in a game against the Philadelphia Phillies. He played in 28 regular-season games in 2006 for St. Louis, but did not appear in the postseason. He would still receive his first career championship ring as the Cardinals bested the Detroit Tigers in five games of the 2006 World Series.

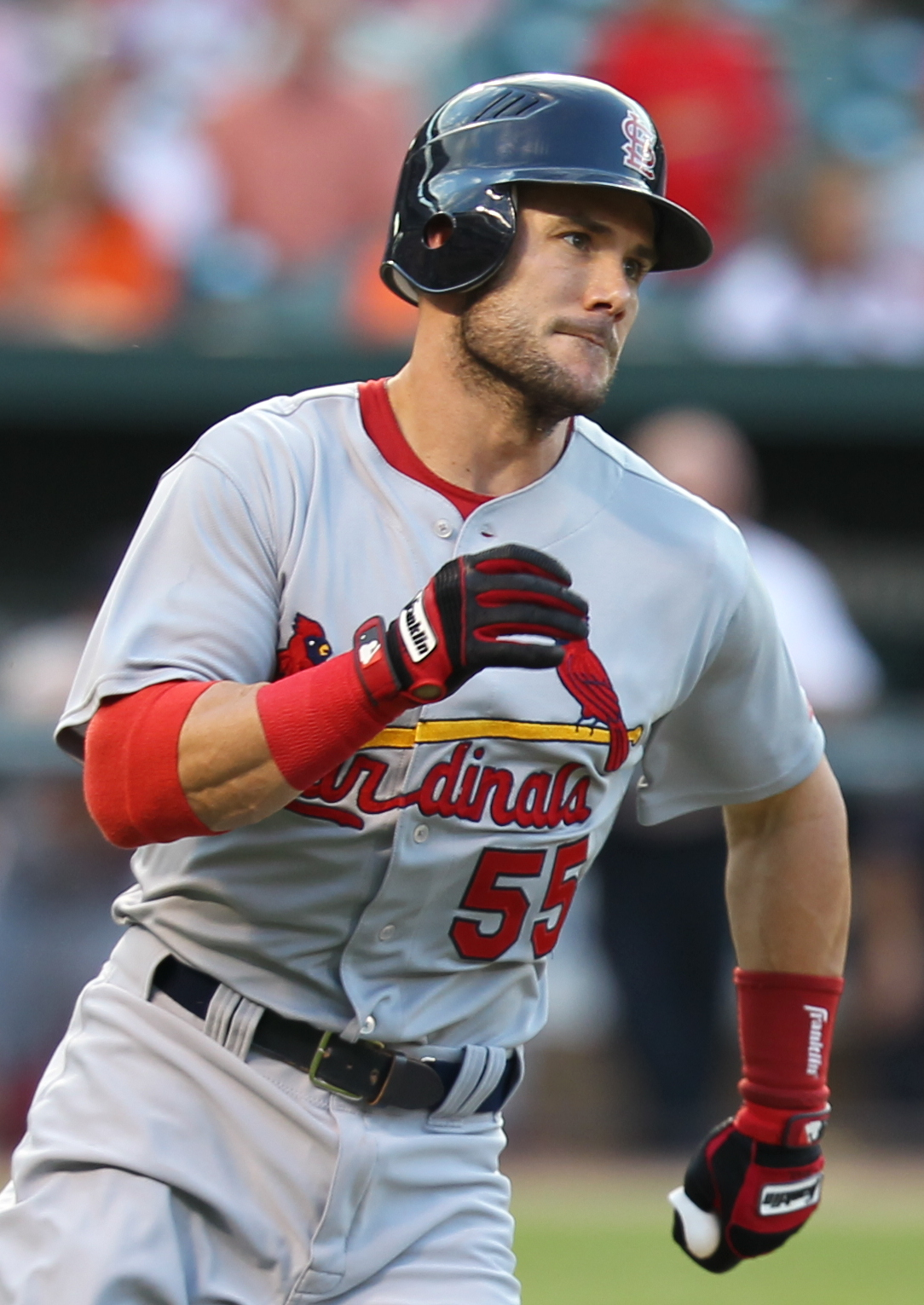
Schumaker in 2011

Schumaker became a capable leadoff hitter and a strong defensive outfielder with an above-average arm. However, he has difficulty against left-handers; from 2007 to 2009, he had a .210 batting average, a .278 on-base percentage, and a .226 slugging percentage against them. He had six hits in seven at-bats against the New York Mets on July 26, the first Cardinal to do so since Terry Moore against the Boston Braves on September 5, 1935. Combined, Schumaker and his teammate, Albert Pujols, were the first pair of Cardinals to hit five or more hits each since Charlie Gelbert and Taylor Douthit against the Chicago Cubs on May 16, 1930.

On February 9, 2009, Cardinal second baseman Adam Kennedy was released by the club, which sparked discussion about placing Schumaker as the regular second baseman in 2009. Schumaker, who played shortstop in high school and college began working out with Cardinals third base coach Jose Oquendo in spring training to prepare. Schumaker would go on to become the Cardinals' starting second baseman during the 2009 season.

On February 8, 2010, Schumaker signed a two-year deal with the Cardinals worth $4.7 million, buying out his final arbitration years. On August 9, 2010, Schumaker hit his first major league grand slam against the Cincinnati Reds. On August 23, 2011, he made his major league pitching debut when he came in as a reliever in the top of the 9th. He faced five batters, striking out two, walking one, and giving up a two-run home run to Aaron Miles.

After the 2011 National League Division Series against the Philadelphia Phillies, in which he drove in Rafael Furcal for the only run in the Cardinals' 1–0 victory in Game 5, Schumaker was left off the National League Championship Series roster due to an oblique injury. He was added back to the 25-man roster for the 2011 World Series against the Texas Rangers and won his second championship title after the Cardinals won the series after a deciding seven games.

Schumaker signed another two-year deal with the Cardinals on December 12, 2011, for $3 million.

=== Los Angeles Dodgers ===
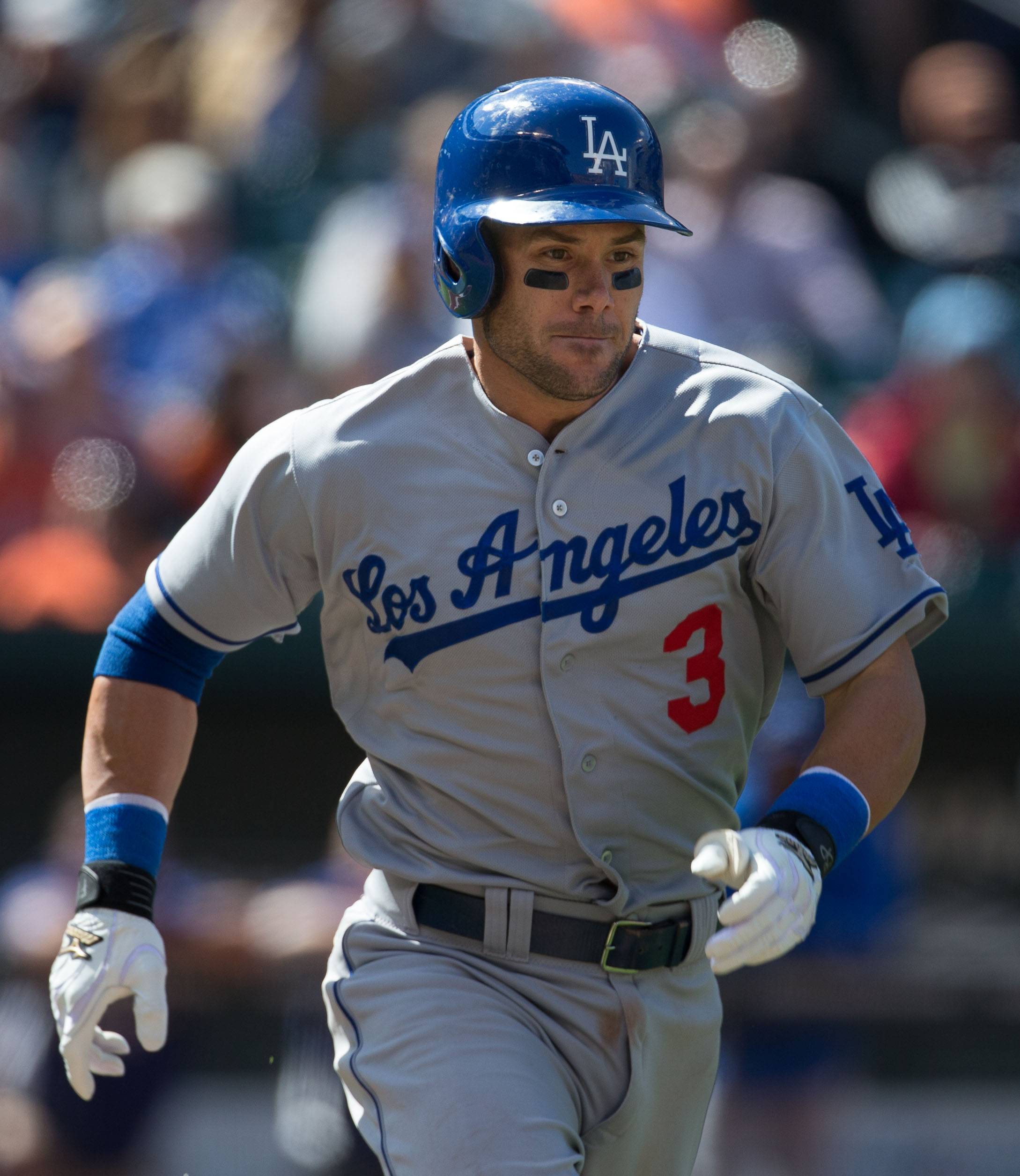
Schumaker with the Los Angeles Dodgers

On December 12, 2012, the St. Louis Cardinals traded Schumaker to the Los Angeles Dodgers for minor league shortstop Jake Lemmerman. He played in 125 games for the Dodgers, hitting .263. He also pitched two scoreless innings for the Dodgers during the season.

=== Cincinnati Reds ===
On November 26, 2013, Schumaker signed a two-year, $5 million contract with the Cincinnati Reds that included a club option for 2016. He attributed his choice to their playoff contention in recent years. Schumaker played in 83 games for Cincinnati in 2014, slashing .235/.287/.308 with two home runs, 22 RBI, and two stolen bases. Schumaker made his fourth and final career pitching appearance on August 21, 2014, against the Atlanta Braves.

Schumaker made 131 appearances for the Reds during the 2015 season, hitting .242/.306/.336 with one home run, 21 RBI, and two stolen bases.

=== San Diego Padres ===
On February 9, 2016, Schumaker signed a minor league contract with the San Diego Padres that included an invitation to spring training. However, on March 9, Schumaker announced his retirement from professional baseball.

== Coaching career ==
=== San Diego Padres ===
In June 2016, Schumaker became an assistant to baseball operations and player development for the San Diego Padres. After the 2017 season ended, Schumaker remained with the team as major league first base coach. He was promoted to associate manager before the 2020 season.

=== St. Louis Cardinals ===
On November 6, 2021, Schumaker was hired as the bench coach for the St. Louis Cardinals.

=== Miami Marlins ===
The Miami Marlins hired Schumaker as their manager on October 25, 2022, after the 2022 season, replacing Don Mattingly. In 2023 he was named National League Manager of the Year. Schumaker left the Marlins shortly before the end of the 2024 season, due to a family emergency, but announced to his players that he would not be returning in 2025.

=== Texas Rangers ===
On November 5, 2024, Schumaker was hired by the Texas Rangers to serve as a senior advisor to president of baseball operations Chris Young.

After manager Bruce Bochy parted ways with the team following the 2025 season, Schumaker was hired as manager of the Rangers on October 3, 2025.

== Personal life ==
Schumaker is a Christian. Schumaker and his wife, Lindsey, have two children, a son and daughter. They previously resided in Ladera Ranch, California, but sold the home in 2017. They still live in Orange County, California.

When Schumaker was five years old and living in southern California, he had a chance encounter with Tommy Lasorda and Orel Hershiser at a restaurant, both of whom signed his baseball glove with "To a future Dodger...". When he reached the Major Leagues with the Cardinals, Schumaker was given uniform number 55, which "happened to be Orel's number and I stuck with it." When he joined the Dodgers in 2013, he initially wore #3, but switched to #55 when it became available.

== Managerial record ==
As of games played on September 27, 2026

Team	Year	Regular season					Postseason			
Team	Year	Games	Won	Lost	Win %	Finish	Won	Lost	Win %	Result
MIA	2023	162	84	78	.519	3rd in NL East	0	2	.000	Lost NLWC (PHI)
MIA	2024	162	62	100	.383	5th in NL East	–	–	–	–
MIA Total		324	146	178	.451		0	2	.000	
TEX	2026	162	80	82	.494	2nd in AL West	–	–	–	–
TEX Total		162	80	82	.494		–	–	–	
TOTAL		486	226	260	.465		0	2	.000	
