= Rat trick =

Celebration by Florida Panthers fans

The rat trick was a celebration performed by fans of the Florida Panthers of the National Hockey League (NHL) during their 1995–96 season, in which plastic rats were thrown onto the ice to celebrate goals. The term, a play on hat trick, was coined by Panthers goaltender John Vanbiesbrouck after teammate Scott Mellanby killed a rat in the locker room prior to the team's home opener with his stick, then scored two goals with the same stick. By the time the Panthers reached the 1996 playoffs, thousands of rats hit the ice after every Panthers goal, resulting in an off-season rule change by the NHL that allowed for referees to penalize the home team if fans disrupted the game by throwing objects onto the ice.

== Origin ==
The 1995–96 season was the third in the NHL for the Panthers, who had been awarded as an expansion franchise in 1992. The team was composed of journeymen veterans and rookies and led by all-star goaltender John Vanbiesbrouck. As the team prepared for its home opener against the Calgary Flames on October 8, 1995, a rat entered the dressing room, startling several players. Scott Mellanby reacted by whacking the rat and making it fly across the locker room with his hockey stick, killing it. He then went out and scored two goals in a 4–3 victory over the Flames, leading the Panthers to their first win of the season. Vanbiesbrouck described the incident to reporters after the game, stating that while Mellanby failed to score a hat trick (three goals in one game), he did manage a "rat trick".

During the next game, a fan threw a plastic rat onto the ice following a Panthers goal. The following game, a few more rats hit the ice. Eventually, over 100 rats were tossed to the ice following Panthers goals, as the Panthers emerged as a top team in the league by mid-November. Eventually, Florida finished the regular season in third place in the Atlantic Division, and qualified for the playoffs for the first time.

Additionally, this Panthers' playoff appearance coincided with the Year of the Rat in the Chinese zodiac. This led fans to believe that the Panthers would have great luck in the playoffs.

== 1996 Stanley Cup playoffs ==
In the first round of the 1996 Stanley Cup playoffs, the Panthers defeated the Boston Bruins in five games, then the Philadelphia Flyers in six games, to reach the Eastern Conference Finals. Then, they defeated the Pittsburgh Penguins in seven games to win the Prince of Wales Trophy as the rat-tossing craze reached its peak as 3,000 rats rained onto the ice following goals. While officially frowning on the practice of throwing rats, the team nonetheless brought on Orkin as a sponsor and employed a crew of 40 rink attendants dressed up as exterminators to clear the ice after each Florida goal.

The "year of the rat" in south Florida reached a fever pitch as the Panthers made their first trip to the Stanley Cup Finals. Area supermarkets sold "rat cakes" (cupcakes with rats drawn in icing), while baseball's Florida Marlins showed the Panthers' game seven victory against the Penguins, in Pittsburgh, on the Jumbotron between innings on June 1 and had the Panthers' arena announcer on hand to announce when the team scored a goal. The Panthers, who had sold out only 15 of 41 home games during the regular season, sold out their first two playoff games against Philadelphia and Pittsburgh in seven minutes. They were set to face the Colorado Avalanche in the 1996 Stanley Cup Finals.

In Game 1, a 3–1 Colorado victory, Colorado fans responded by throwing rat traps onto the ice in Denver following Avalanche goals. Colorado won Game 2 8–1 to lead the series 2–0 as the teams returned to Miami for Games 3 and 4. In the first period of Game 3, Colorado goaltender Patrick Roy famously refused to duck under his net, as other goalies had, to hide from the barrage of rats after Rob Niedermayer's goal at 11:19 put the Panthers up 2–1. During the intermission, Roy promised his teammates that there would be "no more rats". True to his word, Roy did not surrender another goal in that series as the Avalanche came back to win Game 3 3–2 in regulation time, then shut out the Panthers 1–0 in triple overtime in Game 4 to sweep the series and win Colorado's first Stanley Cup.

== Legacy ==
Directly as a result of the rat trick craze, the NHL amended its rules prior to the 1996–97 season to prevent a recurrence of this phenomenon and delays to the game that followed. Per the rule, if fans throw debris onto the ice, the referee can have the public address announcer warn the fans to stop. After a warning, the referee can then issue a delay of game penalty to the home team. The league, however, created a special exemption for articles "thrown onto the ice following a special occasion", specifically excluding the traditional tossing of hats onto the ice following a hat trick goal from subjection to the penalty.

The Panthers held a "Year of the Rat" alumni reunion in 2007 to celebrate the 1996 team and raise money for the Florida Panthers Foundation. As part of the event, the Panthers sold plastic rats for fans to toss onto the ice during the exhibition game, which saw the participation of at least nineteen members of the 1996 team. Mellanby, who retired in 2007, was always remembered for spawning the rat trick. "It became the motto of our team that season. When I played in the all-star game, a kid came up to me and said, 'You're the rat guy.' He didn't even know my name; he just knew I killed the rat."

With the Panthers' success in the 2011–12 NHL season, fans revived the rat tossing by throwing plastic rats onto the ice following home victories. On April 15, 2012, the Florida Panthers threw plastic rats on the ice after a 4–2 playoff victory over the New Jersey Devils. It was the first playoff victory for the Panthers since 1997. In Game 5 of the Eastern Conference Quarterfinals, fans threw hundreds of rats onto the ice, making it the most since the run to the Cup. After victories at the BankAtlantic Center, workers would pick up the rats and return them to the Pantherland gift shop for resale. The Panthers organization alleged that Devils fans bought rats at Pantherland to throw them prematurely in an attempt to spur a penalty against the Panthers. Unwilling to assume the risk, the team decided to discontinue sales of toy rats at Pantherland. It remains unknown whether any other measures would be applied to discourage rat-throwing.

In early 2013, sales of plastic rats resumed at Pantherland. As the Panthers neared the playoffs in March 2016, rats again started to appear on home ice, sometimes after Panther goals and more abundantly after home wins. Twenty years since the fateful playoff run, several members of the 1995–96 team returned to South Florida to be honored on March 12, 2016, including John Vanbiesbrouck, Brian Skrudland and Scott Mellanby.

== See also ==
- Legend of the Octopus
- Towel Power
