= George Khoury Association of Baseball Leagues =

Youth baseball program

- Founded: 1934 in St. Louis, Mo., incorporated in 1936
- Founder: George M. Khoury
- First season: 1934
- Owners: George Khoury Association of Baseball Leagues, Incorporated
- Director: George G. Khoury Sr.
- Claim to fame: The oldest youth sports organization in the United States.
- Motto: "The Khoury League is interested in the child that nobody else wants."
- Sports fielded: youth Baseball and youth Softball
- Website: www.KhouryLeague.org

George Khoury Association of Baseball Leagues, or Khoury League, is a non-profit organization in St. Louis, Missouri that runs youth tee ball, baseball, and softball leagues internationally. It is the longest operating youth baseball program in the United States.

The Khoury Association is operated by an all-volunteer Board of Governors. Local leagues can structure themselves in a way that can best serve their community; the Khoury Association sets few restrictions. The Khoury Association offers programs from ages four and up in a structure that allows kids to move up in a progressive format with balls, field dimensions, etc.

== History ==
The first Khoury league was baseball league founded by George M. Khoury in 1934. He wanted an organized baseball league for his sons that allowed them to play the game with their own age groups. As George G. Khoury Sr. later recalls in his book, Brothers, Bombshells, and Baseball, “Dad knew many people, was a salesman and an organizer.[...] He knew how to get things done, thus one evening he decided to form his own league and the Sixteenth Ward Baseball League, with George Khoury as the sponsor, was started in St. Louis. MO.”

In 1936, George M Khoury and attorney Maury Karner created the George Khoury Association of Baseball Leagues, Inc. The first Khoury Association games were played on Mother’s Day in St. Louis's Forest Park. Khoury insisted that every child be allowed to play, regardless of skill level, and adopted the motto, "The Khoury League Is Interested In The Child That Nobody Else Wants."

The Khoury Association expanded rapidly after World War II, first to the areas adjacent to St. Louis, then to Illinois, Kentucky, Florida and other states. In 1958, the Khoury Association created the first organized youth girls softball league in the United States.

== Program ==
The Khoury Association is a non-profit, nondenominational organization of affiliated circuits and leagues, using a hub system of control and administration. The International office in St. Louis serves in an administrative and advisory capacity. The Association administers anything from one four‐team league to a network of leagues within a 125‐mile radius of a large town or city serving as the network hub, however, the Association is flexible enough to operate larger circuits, such as State or Regional.

== Rules ==
The Khoury Association uses rules that are reviewed and updated annually by a rules committee with representatives from multiple local leagues.

=== Playing Divisions ===
The Khoury Association was the first national sports program to separate youth players into divisions based on age. Players graduate as a team as they progress through the program.

Special rules at the Atom and Pixie levels help the younger children learn how to play baseball. These rules include no base stealing, no balks, and no infield fly . Tee ball divisions are operated and determined by the local Khoury League. Baseball

- Atom I - 8 years old
- Atom II - 9 years old
- Bantam I - 10 years old
- Bantam II - 11 years old
- Midget I - 12 years old
- Midget II - 13 years old
- Juvenile I - 14 years old
- Juvenile II / Junior - 15–18 years old
- Senior - 18 years old +

Softball

- Pixie I - 8 years old
- Pixie II - 9 years old
- Petite - 10–12 years old
- Chic - 12–14 years old
- Intermediate - 14–18 years old
- Senior - 18 years old +

Most leagues have different rules and guidelines for their tee ball divisions that cater to their community's needs. Some Khoury Leagues also offer soccer, basketball, and bowling.

=== Field Dimensions ===
The Khoury Association was the first program to use smaller ball fields and balls for the younger age divisions. There are three different field dimensions for baseball and three for softball. Tee ball field dimensions are determined by the local Khoury League.

=== Playoffs ===
The Khoury Association was the first program to organize playoffs for all teams with others of equal standing in their divisions. The Association also pioneered an all-star game in a Major League Baseball park (Sportsman's Park in St. Louis) for certain divisions.

== Notable Participants ==
=== Honorary Lifetime Members ===
These members include sportscaster Jack Buck, sportsman Gussie Busch., William DeWitt Sr., William D. Montgomery, Joseph A. Mueller, Bill Veeck, and Bernhard Winkleman.

=== National Recognition ===
At its 60th Anniversary Dinner, hosted in 1996 by the Belleville Khoury League, Inc. (the oldest and longest continuing operating Khoury League), the Khoury Association received a letter of congratulations from President Bill Clinton, “For its dedication to our community youth.”

At a Banquet in 2003 in St. Louis, a letter from President George W. Bush was received acknowledging the Khoury Association's over 65 years of service to the United States.

=== Khoury Alumni in Major League Baseball ===
Umpire Davey Phillips, and players Dal Maxvill, Homer Bush and Mike Shannon. Dennis Schutzenhofer St Louis Cardinal batting practice pitcher.
