= 2015 Major League Baseball postseason =

2015 Major League Baseball playoffs

Tournament details
- Dates: October 6 – November 1, 2015
- Teams: 10

Final positions
- Champions: Kansas City Royals (2nd title)
- Runners-up: New York Mets

Tournament statistics
- Games played: 36
- Attendance: 1,634,763 (45,410 per game)
- Most HRs: Daniel Murphy (NYM) (7)
- Most SBs: Lorenzo Cain (KC) (6)
- Most Ks (as pitcher): Jacob deGrom (NYM) (29)

Awards
- MVP: Salvador Pérez (KC)

The 2015 Major League Baseball postseason was the playoff tournament of Major League Baseball for the 2015 season. The winners of the Division Series would move on to the League Championship Series to determine the pennant winners that face each other in the World Series.

In the American League, the Kansas City Royals made their second straight appearance, the New York Yankees returned for the first time since 2012, the Texas Rangers returned for the fourth time in six years, the Houston Astros made their first postseason appearance since 2005 (their first as a member of the American League), and the Toronto Blue Jays ended over two decades of futility by clinching their first postseason appearance since 1993, ending what was the longest postseason appearance drought in Major League Baseball and all four major North American sports leagues. This was Kansas City’s last postseason appearance until 2024.

In the National League, the St. Louis Cardinals made their fifth straight postseason appearance, the Los Angeles Dodgers and Pittsburgh Pirates made their third straight appearances, the Chicago Cubs returned for the first time since 2008, and the New York Mets made their first appearance since 2006. As of 2026, this remains Pittsburgh’s most recent appearance in the postseason, as they now hold the second longest postseason drought in the majors behind only the Los Angeles Angels.

The postseason began on October 6, and ended on November 1, with the Royals defeating the Mets in five games in the 2015 World Series. It was the first title in thirty years for the Royals.

== Playoff seeds ==
American League Teams National League Teams

The following teams qualified for the postseason:

=== American League ===
1. Kansas City Royals – 95–67, AL Central champions
2. Toronto Blue Jays – 93–69, AL East champions
3. Texas Rangers – 88–74, AL West champions
4. New York Yankees – 87–75
5. Houston Astros – 86–76

=== National League ===
1. St. Louis Cardinals – 100–62, NL Central champions
2. Los Angeles Dodgers – 92–70, NL West champions
3. New York Mets – 90–72, NL East champions
4. Pittsburgh Pirates – 98–64
5. Chicago Cubs – 97–65

== Playoff bracket ==
Wild Card Game (ALWC, NLWC)
4	NY Yankees	0
5	Houston	1
4	Pittsburgh	0
5	Chicago Cubs	1

Division Series (ALDS, NLDS)
1	Kansas City	3
5	Houston	2
American League
2	Toronto	3
3	Texas	2
1	St. Louis	1
5	Chicago Cubs	3
National League
2	LA Dodgers	2
3	NY Mets	3

League Championship Series (ALCS, NLCS)
1	Kansas City	4
2	Toronto	2
5	Chicago Cubs	0
3	NY Mets	4

World Series
AL1	Kansas City	4
NL3	NY Mets	1

== American League Wild Card ==
=== (4) New York Yankees vs. (5) Houston Astros ===
October 6, 2015 8:10 pm (EDT) at Yankee Stadium in Bronx, New York, 67 °F (19 °C), partly cloudy
Team	1	2	3	4	5	6	7	8	9	R	H	E
Houston	0	1	0	1	0	0	1	0	0	3	5	0
New York	0	0	0	0	0	0	0	0	0	0	3	0
WP: Dallas Keuchel (1–0) LP: Masahiro Tanaka (0–1) Sv: Luke Gregerson (1); Home runs: HOU: Colby Rasmus (1), Carlos Gómez (1); NYY: None; Attendance: 50,113; Boxscore

This was the first postseason meeting between the Astros and Yankees. Dallas Keuchel pitched six innings of shutout ball as the Astros shut out the Yankees 3–0 to advance to the ALDS. This was the first postseason series win by the Astros since winning the National League pennant in 2005. This would ultimately be Alex Rodriguez’s final postseason game.

The Astros’ 2015 Wild Card victory continued a streak of playoff success for Houston-based teams over their New York City counterparts, as the NBA’s Houston Rockets previously defeated the New York Knicks in the 1994 NBA Finals, and then the Astros would defeat the Yankees again in the ALCS in 2017, 2019, and 2022.

== National League Wild Card ==
=== (4) Pittsburgh Pirates vs. (5) Chicago Cubs ===
October 7, 2015 8:08 pm (EDT) at PNC Park, Pittsburgh, Pennsylvania, 68 °F (20 °C), clear
Team	1	2	3	4	5	6	7	8	9	R	H	E
Chicago	1	0	2	0	1	0	0	0	0	4	7	1
Pittsburgh	0	0	0	0	0	0	0	0	0	0	5	1
WP: Jake Arrieta (1–0) LP: Gerrit Cole (0–1); Home runs: CHC: Kyle Schwarber (1), Dexter Fowler (1); PIT: None; Attendance: 40,889; Boxscore

The Cubs shut out the Pirates 4–0 to advance to the NLDS. This was the second straight year the Pirates were shutout in the Wild Card Game.

To date, this is the last postseason appearance by the Pirates, who now have the longest active postseason drought amongst National League teams, and the second longest postseason drought in the majors.

== American League Division Series ==
=== (1) Kansas City Royals vs. (5) Houston Astros ===
Kansas City won the series, 3–2.

Game	Date	Score	Location	Time	Attendance
1	October 8	Houston Astros – 5, Kansas City Royals – 2	Kauffman Stadium	3:14 (:49 delay)	40,146
2	October 9	Houston Astros – 4, Kansas City Royals – 5	Kauffman Stadium	3:27	40,008
3	October 11	Kansas City Royals – 2, Houston Astros – 4	Minute Maid Park	3:20	42,674
4	October 12	Kansas City Royals – 9, Houston Astros – 6	Minute Maid Park	4:05	42,387
5	October 14	Houston Astros – 2, Kansas City Royals – 7	Kauffman Stadium	2:42	40,566

The Royals defeated the Astros in five games to return to the ALCS for the second straight year.

Collin McHugh pitched six solid innings as the Astros shockingly stole Game 1 on the road. In Game 2, the Astros led 4-2 after five and looked poised to go up 2–0 in the series, but the Royals put up three unanswered runs across the sixth and seventh to even the series headed to Houston. Dallas Keuchel pitched seven solid innings and the Astros’ bullpen shut down a late rally by the Royals as they regained the series lead and were one game away from their first ALCS.

Game 4 was the most memorable contest of the series - the Astros held a 6–2 lead after seven innings and looked poised to close out the series. Then, the Royals offense took apart the Astros bullpen, as they scored five unanswered runs to regain the lead. Eric Hosmer hit a two-run home run to increase the Royals' lead in the top of the ninth, and then the Royals' bullpen closed out the game in the bottom of the inning. This was the second straight year where the Royals, down four runs and six outs away from elimination, were victorious.

In Game 5, Johnny Cueto pitched eight strong innings as the Royals blew out the Astros to close out the series, surviving an upset scare.

=== (2) Toronto Blue Jays vs. (3) Texas Rangers ===
Toronto won the series, 3–2.

Game	Date	Score	Location	Time	Attendance
1	October 8	Texas Rangers – 5, Toronto Blue Jays – 3	Rogers Centre	2:53	49,834
2	October 9	Texas Rangers – 6, Toronto Blue Jays – 4 (14)	Rogers Centre	4:57	49,716
3	October 11	Toronto Blue Jays − 5, Texas Rangers − 1	Globe Life Park	3:08	50,941
4	October 12	Toronto Blue Jays − 8, Texas Rangers − 4	Globe Life Park	3:18	47,679
5	October 14	Texas Rangers − 3, Toronto Blue Jays − 6	Rogers Centre	3:37	49,742

This was the first postseason meeting between the Rangers and Blue Jays. The Blue Jays overcame a two-games-to-none series deficit to defeat the Rangers in five games, returning to the ALCS for the first time since 1993.

In the first postseason game in Toronto in 22 years, Rougned Odor sealed a Rangers victory in Game 1 with a solo homer in the top of the seventh. Game 2 was a long extra-innings grind which was also won by the Rangers, as they took the lead for good in the top of the fourteenth off of back-to-back RBI singles from Hanser Alberto and Delino DeShields, giving them a 2–0 series lead headed to Arlington. Then, the Blue Jays responded. In Game 3, Marco Estrada pitched six innings of shutout ball as the Blue Jays got on the board in the series. In Game 4, Josh Donaldson, Chris Colabello, and Kevin Pillar all homered for the Blue Jays as they routed the Rangers to force a decisive fifth game back in Toronto.

Game 5 of the series was notable for the events that transpired in the seventh inning - the Rangers made three consecutive errors, allowing the Blue Jays to tie the game at 3 runs each. Then José Bautista hit a game-sealing three-run home run, and before running the bases, flipped his bat in celebration. Both benches cleared for a brief scuffle between the teams, but it was resolved shortly thereafter. The Blue Jays closed out the series in the top of the ninth to advance. This was the third time a team won a best-of-five series after losing the first two games at home, and the second time in the 2–2–1 format. This was the first playoff series won by the Blue Jays since the 1993 World Series.

These same two teams would meet again in the ALDS the next year, which the Blue Jays won in a sweep.

== National League Division Series ==
=== (1) St. Louis Cardinals vs. (5) Chicago Cubs ===
Chicago won the series, 3–1.

Game	Date	Score	Location	Time	Attendance
1	October 9	Chicago Cubs – 0, St. Louis Cardinals – 4	Busch Stadium	2:47	47,830
2	October 10	Chicago Cubs – 6, St. Louis Cardinals – 3	Busch Stadium	2:57	47,859
3	October 12	St. Louis Cardinals – 6, Chicago Cubs – 8	Wrigley Field	3:28	42,411
4	October 13	St. Louis Cardinals – 4, Chicago Cubs – 6	Wrigley Field	3:16	42,411

This was the first postseason meeting in the history of the Cardinals–Cubs rivalry, also known as the I-55 or Route 66 Rivalry. The Cubs upset the top-seeded Cardinals in four games to return to the NLCS for the first time since 2003.

John Lackey pitched seven innings of shutout ball as the Cardinals took Game 1. In Game 2, the Cardinals struck first with one run in the bottom of the first, but the Cubs went on a 6-2 run across the next four innings, capped off by a two-run homer from Jorge Soler and an RBI from Miguel Montero to even the series headed to Chicago. Game 3 was a record-setting back-and-forth offensive slugfest that was won by the Cubs, who set an MLB record with six home runs. Game 4 remained tied until the bottom of the sixth, when Anthony Rizzo hit a solo homer that put the Cubs ahead for good, denying their biggest rivals a fifth consecutive NLCS appearance.

=== (2) Los Angeles Dodgers vs. (3) New York Mets ===
New York won the series, 3–2.

Game	Date	Score	Location	Time	Attendance
1	October 9	New York Mets – 3, Los Angeles Dodgers – 1	Dodger Stadium	3:14	54,428
2	October 10	New York Mets – 2, Los Angeles Dodgers – 5	Dodger Stadium	3:24	54,455
3	October 12	Los Angeles Dodgers – 7, New York Mets – 13	Citi Field	3:42	44,276
4	October 13	Los Angeles Dodgers – 3, New York Mets – 1	Citi Field	2:50	44,183
5	October 15	New York Mets – 3, Los Angeles Dodgers – 2	Dodger Stadium	3:13	54,602

This was the third postseason meeting between the Dodgers and Mets (1988, 2006). The Mets defeated the Dodgers in five games to advance to the NLCS for the first time since 2006.

In his postseason debut, Jacob deGrom outdueled Clayton Kershaw on the mound as the Mets stole Game 1 on the road. In Game 2, the Mets jumped out to a 2-0 lead in the top of the second, but the Dodgers put up five unanswered runs to even the series headed to Queens. Game 2 was marred by controversy as the Dodgers’ Chase Utley slid into the Mets’ Rubén Tejada, which resulted in Tejada suffering a fractured fibula, which caused him to miss the rest of the postseason. The Mets blew out the Dodgers in Game 3 to regain the series lead. In Game 4, despite being on only three days rest, Kershaw redeemed himself on the mound with a solid seven-inning performance as he and the Dodgers’ bullpen shut down the Mets offense to force a decisive fifth game back in Los Angeles. In Game 5, the Dodgers took a 2-1 lead after the first, but deGrom bounced back and shutout the Dodgers’ offense the next five innings, and the Mets’ bullpen finished what he started as they won 3-2 to advance.

Both teams would meet again in the NLCS in 2024, which was won by the Dodgers in six games en route to a World Series title.

== American League Championship Series ==
=== (1) Kansas City Royals vs. (2) Toronto Blue Jays ===
Kansas City won the series, 4–2.

Game	Date	Score	Location	Time	Attendance
1	October 16	Toronto Blue Jays – 0, Kansas City Royals – 5	Kauffman Stadium	3:15	39,753
2	October 17	Toronto Blue Jays – 3, Kansas City Royals – 6	Kauffman Stadium	3:19	40,357
3	October 19	Kansas City Royals – 8, Toronto Blue Jays – 11	Rogers Centre	3:13	49,751
4	October 20	Kansas City Royals – 14, Toronto Blue Jays – 2	Rogers Centre	3:39	49,501
5	October 21	Kansas City Royals – 1, Toronto Blue Jays – 7	Rogers Centre	2:56	49,325
6	October 23	Toronto Blue Jays – 3, Kansas City Royals – 4	Kauffman Stadium	3:42 (:45 delay)	40,494

This was a rematch of the 1985 ALCS, which the Royals won in seven games en route to a World Series title after trailing 3–1 in the series. On the 30th anniversary of their previous postseason meeting, the Royals again defeated the Blue Jays, this time in six games, to advance to the World Series for the second year in a row.

In Kansas City, the Royals controlled the first two games - Edinson Vólquez and the Royals’ bullpen silenced the Jays’ offense in a 5-0 shutout in Game 1. In Game 2, the Blue Jays led 3-0 after six innings, but the Royals put up six unanswered runs across the seventh and eighth innings respectively to take a 2–0 series lead headed to Toronto. Game 3 was an offensive shootout between both teams, which was won by the Blue Jays as Troy Tulowitzki, Josh Donaldson, and Ryan Goins all homered for the Jays. In Game 4, the Royals blew out the Blue Jays to take a commanding 3–1 series lead, handing Toronto their worst playoff loss ever. Marco Estrada pitched 7 2/3 solid innings in Game 5 as the Blue Jays blew out the Royals to send the series back to Kansas City. The Royals’ bullpen stopped a late rally by the Blue Jays in Game 6 to clinch the pennant.

The Blue Jays returned to the ALCS the next year, but fell to the Cleveland Indians in five games. They would eventually win the pennant again in 2025 over the Seattle Mariners in seven games after being eight outs away from elimination in Game 7, but would fall in the World Series.

As of 2026, this is the last time the Royals won the AL pennant, and the last time that either Missouri team won a league pennant.

== National League Championship Series ==
=== (3) New York Mets vs. (5) Chicago Cubs ===
New York won the series, 4–0.

Game	Date	Score	Location	Time	Attendance
1	October 17	Chicago Cubs – 2, New York Mets – 4	Citi Field	2:55	44,287
2	October 18	Chicago Cubs – 1, New York Mets – 4	Citi Field	3:07	44,502
3	October 20	New York Mets – 5, Chicago Cubs – 2	Wrigley Field	3:01	42,231
4	October 21	New York Mets – 8, Chicago Cubs – 3	Wrigley Field	3:32	42,227

This was the first of three straight NLCS appearances for the Cubs. The Mets swept the Cubs to return to the World Series for the first time since 2000.

Matt Harvey pitched seven solid innings as the Mets took Game 1. Noah Syndergaard pitched five shutout innings and Daniel Murphy’s two-run home run in the bottom of the first helped secure a Mets win in Game 2 as they went up 2–0 in the series headed to Chicago. In Game 3, Jacob deGrom pitched seven strong innings and Murphy hit his third home run of the series as the Mets took a commanding three games to none series lead. In Game 4, Lucas Duda ignited the Mets’ offense as they blew out the Cubs to complete the sweep and secure the pennant. This was the first NLCS which the team who swept the series did not trail in any of the games.

By coincidence, the Cubs' 2015 season ended on the same day as the 2015 World Series that was depicted in Back to the Future Part II. In the film, the Cubs swept a fictitious Miami team. However, the prediction in Back to the Future Part II was only off by one year. The next season, the Cubs finished with the best record in the majors and clinched the overall #1 seed in the 2016 postseason. Then, they finally ended their long pennant drought in the NLCS against the Los Angeles Dodgers in six games, and then went on to win the World Series over the Cleveland Indians in seven games after trailing 3–1 in the series.

As of 2026, this is the last time the Mets won the NL pennant, and was the only pennant won by a New York City-based team during the 2010s decade. The Mets returned to the NLCS in 2024, but lost to the eventual World Series champion Los Angeles Dodgers in six games.

== 2015 World Series ==
=== (AL1) Kansas City Royals vs. (NL3) New York Mets ===
Kansas City won the series, 4–1.

Game	Date	Score	Location	Time	Attendance
1	October 27	New York Mets – 4, Kansas City Royals – 5 (14)	Kauffman Stadium	5:09	40,320
2	October 28	New York Mets – 1, Kansas City Royals – 7	Kauffman Stadium	2:54	40,410
3	October 30	Kansas City Royals – 3, New York Mets – 9	Citi Field	3:22	44,781
4	October 31	Kansas City Royals – 5, New York Mets – 3	Citi Field	3:29	44,815
5	November 1	Kansas City Royals – 7, New York Mets – 2 (12)	Citi Field	4:15	44,859

This was the first World Series to feature two expansion teams - the Mets were the first expansion team to win the World Series overall in 1969, while the Royals became the first American League expansion team to win the World Series, doing so in 1985. The Royals defeated the Mets in five games to win their first World Series title since 1985, ending a three-decade long championship drought for not just the Royals, but Kansas City in general.

In Game 1, the Mets held a 4–3 lead in the bottom of the ninth, however the Royals' Alex Gordon hit a solo home run to tie the game, handing New York's Jeurys Familia his first blown save in six postseason opportunities. Eric Hosmer won Game 1 for the Royals in the bottom of the fourteenth with a sacrifice fly. Johnny Cueto pitched a two-hit complete game as the Royals blew out the Mets to go up 2–0 in the series headed to Queens. Cueto became the first American League pitcher to throw a complete game in the World Series since Jack Morris’ ten-inning shutout in Game 7 of the 1991 World Series, and was the last pitcher to throw a complete game in the World Series overall until Yoshinobu Yamamoto in 2025. In Game 3, Noah Syndergaard pitched seven solid innings as the Mets blew out the Royals to get on the board in the series. In Game 4, the Mets took a 3-1 lead early in part because of two home runs from Michael Conforto, who became the first rookie to hit two runs in a World Series game since Andruw Jones in 1996. However, the Royals rallied with four unanswered runs across innings six through eight to take a 3-1 series lead. In Game 5, New York's Matt Harvey helped keep the Royals' offense at bay and maintained a 2–0 lead for the Mets going into the bottom of the ninth. However, the Royals' Eric Hosmer cut the Mets lead to one with an RBI double which scored Lorenzo Cain, which prompted Mets manager Terry Collins to relive Harvey with Jeurys Familia. This decision proved to be fatal for the Mets, as Familia had yet another blown save as Hosmer stole home plate to tie the game. The game went scoreless throughout the tenth and eleventh innings, until the Royals broke the game open in the top of the twelfth, scoring five runs to take the lead for good, effectively securing the title. This was the second time in a row that the Mets lost the World Series at their home stadium (2000).

As of 2026, this is the last postseason appearance outside of the divisional round by the Royals, and the last time that a team from Missouri made and won the World Series.

As of 2026, this is the most recent World Series appearance for the Mets and only World Series appearance by a team from New York City during the 2010s decade, making it the first since the 1910s decade that a team from New York City did not win a World Series.

== Broadcasting ==
This was second year of eight-year U.S. TV contracts with ESPN, Fox Sports, and TBS. ESPN aired the American League Wild Card Game, Fox Sports 1 and MLB Network split the American League Division Series, and the Fox broadcast network and Fox Sports 1 split the American League Championship Series. TBS had the National League Wild Card Game, Division Series, and Championship Series, with sister network TNT used as an overflow channel. The World Series then aired on the Fox broadcast network for the sixteenth consecutive year.
