= Unwritten rules of baseball =

Informal behavioral code followed by some baseball players

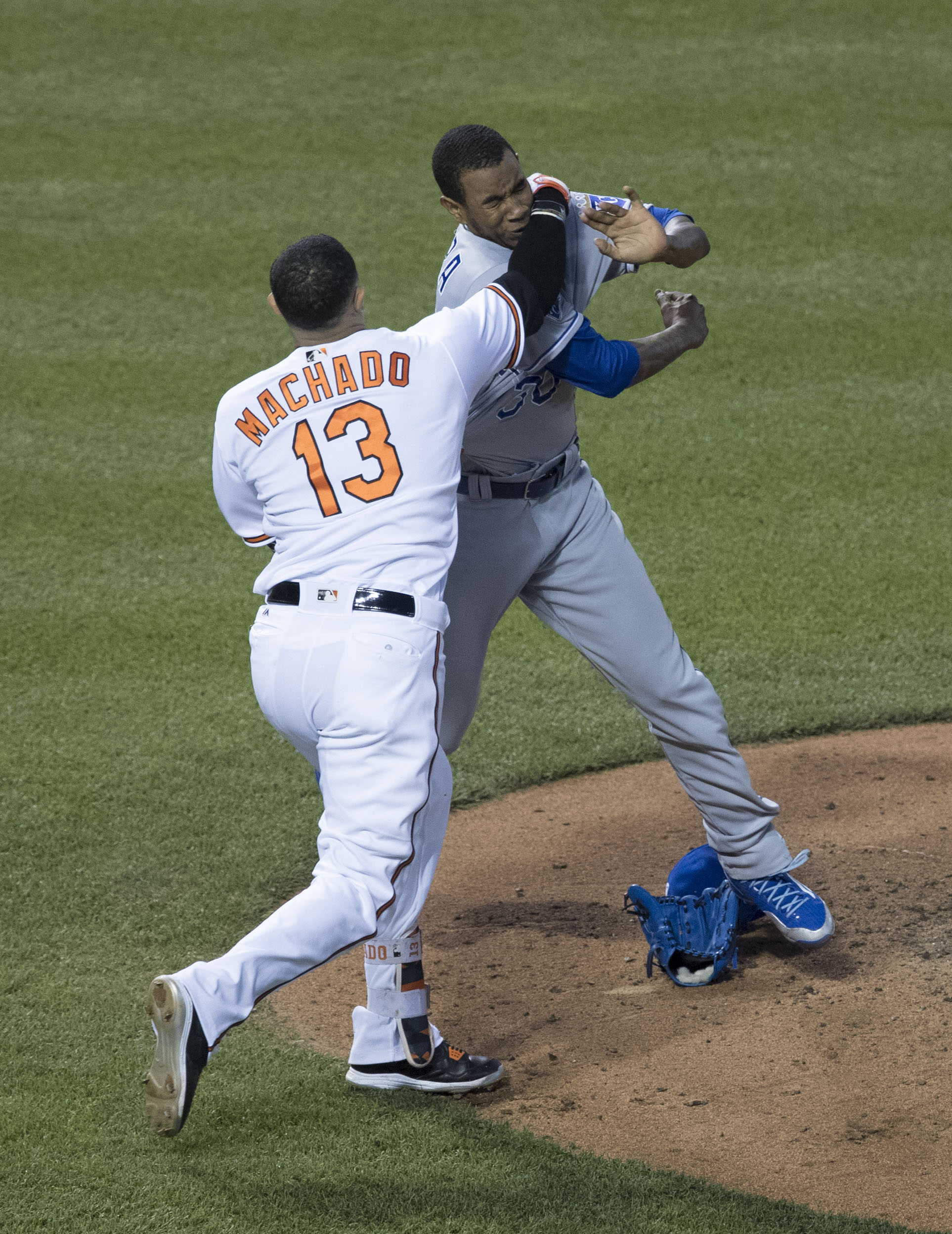
A 2016 fight between Manny Machado and Yordano Ventura concerned the unwritten rules of baseball.

There is a set of unwritten rules of baseball that some players and managers follow. The rules often concern gamesmanship and not disrespecting players on the opposing team. Incidents have occurred when one or more players interpret the actions of another player as violating the unwritten rules, which can result in beanballs and bench-clearing brawls. As the rules are unwritten, and in many cases vague, the interpretation is left to the players involved.

== History ==
Since the beginnings of baseball in the 19th century, players have adopted unwritten rules about how to behave during the game. According to sportswriter Ross Bernstein, these rules have evolved over time. Joe Garagiola wrote a book about baseball published in 1960, titled Baseball is a Funny Game, in which he mentioned the unwritten rules of baseball.

Baseball is a game played with bat and ball and governed by rules set forth by a committee under the direction of the commissioner of baseball. Baseball is a game played by human beings and governed by unwritten laws of survival and self-preservation.

— Joe Garagiola,

In his book, Garagiola described the "purpose pitch", also known as a brushback pitch, a pitch thrown towards the batter's head. In 1986, Peter Schmuck and Randy Youngman of the Orange County Register wrote a column on the unwritten rules, identifying 30 such rules. The column was later carried by Baseball Digest in their June 1986 issue.

The unwritten rules of baseball are meant to establish certain behavioral thresholds for sportsmanship. Though some rules are universal, they are not always enforced in an equal way. Certain players are given more leeway than others, especially veteran home run hitters who take time admiring their home runs.

== Unwritten rules ==
The unwritten rules include but are not limited to:

For the batter

- Do not bunt to break up a no-hitter
- Do not swing on a 3–0 count when your team is comfortably ahead
- Do not take your time admiring a home run you hit
- Do not steal bases if your team is ahead by a significant amount
- Do not swing at the first pitch of the at-bat if the pitcher has allowed back-to-back home runs
- Do not work the count if your team is winning or losing by a significant amount
- Do not rub the spot where you were hit by a pitch
- Do not walk in front of a catcher or umpire when walking to the batter's box
- Do not stand on the dirt near home plate when the pitcher is warming up
- Do not assist a member of the opposing team
- Do not speak to a pitcher who is in the process of throwing a no-hitter
- Do not look back at a catcher's signs or where they are setting up

For the pitcher

- A pitcher who is removed from the game in the middle of an inning must stay in the dugout until the end of the inning
- A pitcher should not indicate displeasure if one of his fielders commits an error

For the fans

- Do not discuss a no-hitter that is currently in progress

Punishments for violating the unwritten rules include beanball wars. These beanings can result in bench-clearing brawls.

Some unwritten rules are no longer followed. The baseball color line, dictating that black players could not play in Major League Baseball (MLB), was an unwritten rule. It was broken in 1947 with the signing of Jackie Robinson.

== Notable incidents ==
Stan Williams, a pitcher who played during the 1960s, wrote the names of players he felt he had to retaliate against on the inside of his baseball cap.

In 1979, pitcher Ed Farmer allowed a home run to Wayne Gross, and felt that Gross took too long rounding the bases. The next time they faced each other was four years later; they were teammates and Farmer hit Gross during batting practice to retaliate.

In a 1964 game between the Cincinnati Reds and the Philadelphia Phillies, the Reds' Chico Ruiz stole home during a scoreless game, while Frank Robinson, their best hitter, was at bat. The Phillies felt this violated baseball's unwritten rules, and he was hit in the ribs during an at bat.

Pitcher Bob Gibson was a known adherent of the unwritten rules. He once beaned an opposing batter for a perceived slight that had occurred 15 years earlier.

Nolan Ryan adhered to the unwritten rules, and was known to retaliate for violations against other teams' players with beanballs. He would also throw beanballs at hitters who bunted to him, making him field his position. The Chicago White Sox took issue with his brushback pitches, leading to a brawl between Ryan and Robin Ventura after Ryan threw at Ventura during a game in 1993.

In 1994, while playing in Minor League Baseball, Michael Jordan violated the unwritten rules by stealing third base even though his team had an 11–0 lead. His manager, Terry Francona, explained the unwritten rule to him after the game.

Alex Rodriguez was twice criticized for violating the unwritten rules during his career. In 2007, Rodriguez distracted Howie Clark from catching a pop up while he ran the bases. During a 2010 game between the Oakland Athletics and New York Yankees, Rodriguez ran from first to third base on a foul ball, and crossed the pitcher's mound while returning to first base. Athletics' pitcher Dallas Braden called out Rodriguez for crossing the mound.

Players who have bunted to break up a no-hitter have received attention. Ben Davis bunted against Curt Schilling during a potential perfect game in 2001, stirring controversy. During a 2014 game, Andrew Cashner was in the process of a no-hitter, when Domonic Brown bunted for a hit. Andrelton Simmons bunted for a hit during a no-hitter in 2018.

In 2015, Manny Machado hit a home run off of Jonathan Papelbon, and Papelbon believed that Machado took too much time admiring the home run. The next time they faced each other, Papelbon threw at Machado's head. Bryce Harper, Papelbon's teammate, took issue with Papelbon's reaction. When Harper failed to hustle on a fly out, Papelbon confronted Harper in the dugout, leading to a fight. Harper later called for the end to the unwritten rules. While many fans agreed with Harper, players supported Papelbon.

In the 2015 American League Division Series between the Toronto Blue Jays and the Texas Rangers, the Blue Jays' José Bautista hit a home run and flipped his bat in an exaggerated manner. Pitcher Sam Dyson took offense to the bat flip and told Edwin Encarnación to tell Bautista to "respect the game". The next year, the Rangers retaliated by having pitcher Matt Bush bean Bautista. Bautista later slid into the Rangers' Rougned Odor, leading to a fight.

In a 2019 National League game between the Cincinnati Reds and Pittsburgh Pirates, Reds player Derek Dietrich stood at home plate and admired a home run off pitcher Chris Archer, which bounced out of the stadium and into the Allegheny River. The Pirates felt he admired it for too long of a time, and Archer threw behind him on his next at-bat, sparking a brawl that resulted in the ejections of four players and Reds manager David Bell. Dietrich went on to hit another home run that also left the stadium, though the Pirates eventually won 7–5.

In 2020, Fernando Tatís Jr. of the San Diego Padres was accused of breaking an unwritten rule in a game against the Texas Rangers when he swung at a 3–0 pitch with the bases loaded when his team was leading by seven runs in the eighth inning. The swing resulted in a grand slam that extended the Padres' lead to 11 runs. Rangers manager Chris Woodward and Padres manager Jayce Tingler were critical of Tatís, and Tatís issued an apology. The following day, in another game against the Rangers, Tatís allegedly broke another unwritten rule by stealing third base when his team was leading by six runs in the fourth inning. A number of current and former players came to Tatís's defense.

In 2021, rookie Yermín Mercedes of the Chicago White Sox was accused by his own manager of breaking an unwritten rule in a game against the Minnesota Twins. Mercedes swung at a 3–0 pitch when his team was leading 15–4, hitting a home run off Willians Astudillo, a position player pitching. The next game, in the seventh inning, Mercedes was thrown at by Twins pitcher Tyler Duffey, resulting in him and manager Rocco Baldelli being ejected from the game by home plate umpire Jim Reynolds. White Sox manager Tony La Russa was publicly critical of Mercedes, calling him "clueless", and said he didn't have a problem with the Twins throwing behind Mercedes in apparent retaliation. In contrast, teammates of Mercedes, as well as opponents, including pitcher and future teammate Alex Wood, supported him.

== "Let the Kids Play" marketing campaign ==
In 2018 MLB launched a marketing campaign called "Let the Kids Play", which explicitly criticized the unwritten rules concerning bat flips and player celebrations. MLB began embracing bat flips, promoting them to fans on social media. This became an issue of contention when Tim Anderson did a bat flip after a home run in April 2019. Pitcher Brad Keller hit Anderson with a pitch during Anderson's next at bat, causing a bench-clearing brawl.

== See also ==
- Charging the mound
- The Spirit of Cricket
- The Spirit of Curling
- Unspoken rule
