= 2016 American League Division Series =

Teams
| Team (Wins) | | Manager | Season |
| Toronto Blue Jays (3) | | John Gibbons | 89–73 (.549), GB: 4 |
| Texas Rangers (0) | | Jeff Banister | 95–67 (.586), GA: 9 |
- Dates: October 6–9
- Television: United States: TBS; Canada: Sportsnet (English); TVA Sports (French)
- TV announcers: Brian Anderson, Dennis Eckersley, Joe Simpson, and Matt Winer (English); Jacques Doucet and Rodger Brulotte (French)
- Radio: ESPN
- Radio announcers: Chris Berman (Games 1–2); Michael Kay (Game 3), and Rick Sutcliffe
- Umpires: Lance Barksdale, Cory Blaser, Chad Fairchild, Sam Holbrook, Hunter Wendelstedt, and Joe West (crew chief); Replay: Chris Conroy, Kerwin Danley, Gerry Davis, Adrian Johnson

Teams
| Team (Wins) | | Manager | Season |
| Cleveland Indians (3) | | Terry Francona | 94–67 (.584), GA: 8 |
| Boston Red Sox (0) | | John Farrell | 93–69 (.574), GA: 4 |
- Dates: October 6–10
- Television: United States: TBS; Canada: Sportsnet
- TV announcers: Ernie Johnson Jr., Ron Darling, Cal Ripken Jr., and Sam Ryan
- Radio: ESPN
- Radio announcers: Jon Sciambi and Chris Singleton
- Umpires: Vic Carapazza, Phil Cuzzi, Paul Emmel, Brian Knight, Bill Miller (crew chief) and Tony Randazzo; Replay: Chris Conroy, Kerwin Danley, Gerry Davis, Adrian Johnson
- ALWC: Toronto Blue Jays defeated Baltimore Orioles, 5–2 (10)

The 2016 American League Division Series (ALDS) were two best-of-five game series in Major League Baseball’s (MLB) 2016 postseason to determine the participating teams in the 2016 American League Championship Series of Major League Baseball. The three divisional winners (seeded 1–3) and the winner of a one-game Wild Card playoff played in two series. The divisional winners were the Texas Rangers in the American League West with the first seed by virtue of having the best record in the American League, the Cleveland Indians in the American League Central with the second seed, and the Boston Red Sox in the American League East with the third seed. The Toronto Blue Jays beat the Baltimore Orioles in the Wild Card Game, earning the fourth seed.

The top two seeds had home-field advantage, and the top seed was matched against the lowest seed. The matchups were:

- (1) Texas Rangers (AL West champions) vs. (4) Toronto Blue Jays (Wild Card Game Winner): Blue Jays won the series, 3–0.
- (2) Cleveland Indians (AL Central champions) vs. (3) Boston Red Sox (AL West champions): Indians won the series, 3–0.

TBS televised all the games in the United States, with Sportsnet, a property of Toronto Blue Jays owner Rogers Communications, airing the games in Canada using the TBS feeds. The Blue Jays and Indians both swept their respective opponents in three games to advance to the ALCS.

The Indians defeated the Blue Jays in the ALCS, then lost the 2016 World Series to the National League champion Chicago Cubs.

== Matchups ==
=== Texas Rangers vs. Toronto Blue Jays ===
Toronto won the series, 3–0.

| Game | Date | Score | Location | Time | Attendance |
|---|---|---|---|---|---|
| 1 | October 6 | Toronto Blue Jays – 10, Texas Rangers – 1 | Globe Life Park | 2:58 | 47,434 |
| 2 | October 7 | Toronto Blue Jays – 5, Texas Rangers – 3 | Globe Life Park | 3:30 | 48,019 |
| 3 | October 9 | Texas Rangers – 6, Toronto Blue Jays – 7 (10) | Rogers Centre | 3:21 | 49,555 |

=== Cleveland Indians vs. Boston Red Sox ===
Cleveland won the series, 3–0.

| Game | Date | Score | Location | Time | Attendance |
|---|---|---|---|---|---|
| 1 | October 6 | Boston Red Sox – 4, Cleveland Indians – 5 | Progressive Field | 3:33 | 37,763 |
| 2 | October 7 | Boston Red Sox – 0, Cleveland Indians – 6 | Progressive Field | 3:19 | 37,842 |
| 3 | October 10 | Cleveland Indians – 4, Boston Red Sox – 3 | Fenway Park | 3:41 | 39,530 |

== Texas vs. Toronto ==
This was the second meeting between the Blue Jays and the Rangers in the postseason, the first being the 2015 American League Division Series in which the Blue Jays defeated the Rangers after losing the first two games at home, which was marked by a controversy-laden deciding Game 5 defined by José Bautista's bat flip. It was also the first series between the two teams since May 15, a game which featured multiple bench clearing skirmishes and the infamous Rougned Odor punch of Bautista.

=== Game 1 ===
October 6, 2016 3:39 pm (CDT) at Globe Life Park in Arlington, Texas 89 °F (32 °C), mostly cloudy
| Team | 1 | 2 | 3 | 4 | 5 | 6 | 7 | 8 | 9 | R | H | E |
|---|---|---|---|---|---|---|---|---|---|---|---|---|
| Toronto | 0 | 0 | 5 | 2 | 0 | 0 | 0 | 0 | 3 | 10 | 13 | 0 |
| Texas | 0 | 0 | 0 | 0 | 0 | 0 | 0 | 0 | 1 | 1 | 4 | 1 |
WP: Marco Estrada (1–0) LP: Cole Hamels (0–1); Home runs: TOR: Melvin Upton Jr. (1), José Bautista (1); TEX: None; Attendance: 47,434; Boxscore

The Blue Jays opened the scoring in the third inning with five runs. Ezequiel Carrera walked with one out, moved to second on a wild pitch, then scored on Josh Donaldson's double. Back-to-back singles by Edwin Encarnacion and José Bautista made it 2–0. After Russell Martin walked to load the bases, Troy Tulowitzki cleared them with a triple. Rangers' starter Cole Hamels threw 42 pitches that inning, the most pitches in an inning he had ever thrown. Next inning, Melvin Upton Jr.'s leadoff home run made it 6–0. Rangers' shortstop Elvis Andrus's throwing error to first allowed Devon Travis to reach. He moved to second on a passed ball, then scored on Josh Donaldson's single to make it 7–0 and knock Hamels out of the game. The Rangers bullpen tossed 4 2/3 scoreless innings, but after back-to-back singles to lead off the ninth off Jake Diekman, Bautista hit a three-run home run amid boos from the Rangers crowd, giving the Blue Jays a 10–0 lead. Blue Jays' starter Marco Estrada went a strong 8 1/3 innings having given up only four hits and one earned run (in the ninth when Andrus hit a leadoff triple and scored on Shin-Soo Choo's groundout) on 98 pitches.

=== Game 2 ===
October 7, 2016 12:08 pm (CDT) at Globe Life Park in Arlington, Texas 61 °F (16 °C), mist
| Team | 1 | 2 | 3 | 4 | 5 | 6 | 7 | 8 | 9 | R | H | E |
|---|---|---|---|---|---|---|---|---|---|---|---|---|
| Toronto | 0 | 2 | 0 | 0 | 3 | 0 | 0 | 0 | 0 | 5 | 6 | 0 |
| Texas | 0 | 0 | 0 | 1 | 0 | 0 | 0 | 2 | 0 | 3 | 13 | 0 |
WP: J. A. Happ (1–0) LP: Yu Darvish (0–1) Sv: Roberto Osuna (1); Home runs: TOR: Troy Tulowitzki (1), Kevin Pillar (1), Ezequiel Carrera (1), Edwin Encarnación (1); TEX: None; Attendance: 48,019; Boxscore

In Game 2, Texas sent out Yu Darvish, who was unable to participate in Texas's 2015 playoff run due to recovery from Tommy John surgery. In return, the Jays responded with 20-game winner J. A. Happ. The Rangers offense, which mustered only four hits in Game 1, erupted for 13 hits in Game 2. However, three runs was all that Texas could get on the day, as their dismal hitting with runners in scoring position failed to bring home any more baserunners (the Rangers went 2-for-18 in RISP situations, and left 13 men on base). Meanwhile, Darvish gave up only five hits through five innings; however, four of those hits were home runs (a two-run home run to Troy Tulowitzki in the second after a leadoff walk, then three home runs in the fifth to Kevin Pillar, Ezequiel Carrera and Edwin Encarnacion), which tied the MLB playoff record for most home runs given up by a pitcher in a single game. The Rangers scored their first run of the game on three straight one-out singles in the fourth. In the eighth, Francisco Liriano allowed a leadoff double and one out walk before Carlos Gomez's RBI single made it 5–2 Blue Jays. Liriano was then removed from the game due to taking a line-drive off his head and later be diagnosed with a concussion. Toronto manager John Gibbons called upon his closer Roberto Osuna to get a five-out save. Osuna allowed an RBI groundout to Ian Desmond before striking out Carlos Beltran to end the inning. Then he allowed a leadoff double to Adrián Beltré in the bottom of the ninth to bring the tying run to the plate with no outs. The next three Rangers batters went down in order without being able to advance Beltre, giving the Jays a 2–0 series lead heading to Toronto for Game 3. With the loss the Rangers dropped to 1–11 in Division Series home games. This would be the last postseason game at Globe Life Park in Arlington as the Rangers would move to Globe Life Field in 2020.

=== Game 3 ===
October 9, 2016 7:38 pm (EDT) at Rogers Centre in Toronto, Ontario 73 °F (23 °C), roof closed
| Team | 1 | 2 | 3 | 4 | 5 | 6 | 7 | 8 | 9 | 10 | R | H | E |
|---|---|---|---|---|---|---|---|---|---|---|---|---|---|
| Texas | 1 | 0 | 1 | 2 | 0 | 2 | 0 | 0 | 0 | 0 | 6 | 4 | 1 |
| Toronto | 3 | 0 | 2 | 0 | 0 | 1 | 0 | 0 | 0 | 1 | 7 | 10 | 0 |
WP: Roberto Osuna (1–0) LP: Matt Bush (0–1); Home runs: TEX: Elvis Andrus (1), Rougned Odor (1); TOR: Edwin Encarnación (2), Russell Martin (1); Attendance: 49,555; Boxscore

Looking to eliminate the Rangers from the playoffs for the second consecutive year, the Blue Jays sent American League ERA leader Aaron Sanchez to the mound in Game 3. The Rangers countered with starter Colby Lewis. The Rangers took their first lead of the series in the top of the first with a walk to Carlos Gómez, a stolen base, and back-to-back groundouts. The Blue Jays, though, took that lead away immediately in the bottom of the same inning with a two-run home run by Edwin Encarnación and a shot by Russell Martin, making the score 3–1, Jays. The Rangers chipped away in the third with an Elvis Andrus home run to cut the score to 3–2. But the Blue Jays pulled ahead in the bottom of the same inning on an RBI double by Josh Donaldson that just stayed fair down the right field line and knocked Lewis out of the game, followed by an RBI single by Encarnación off Tony Barnette to make it 5–2. The Rangers made it a one-run game again with a two-run home run to dead center by Rougned Odor. Sanchez would pitch into the sixth inning, leaving with two runners on and a 5–4 lead. Joe Biagini would allow a double to Mitch Moreland that just got out of the reach of Kevin Pillar that scored two runs and gave the Rangers a 6–5 lead. In the bottom of the sixth, a passed ball by Jonathan Lucroy with the bases loaded allowed Troy Tulowitzki to score the tying run. The game would go into the tenth inning tied at six. Rangers pitcher Matt Bush, pitching his third inning of relief, gave up a leadoff double to Donaldson. After an intentional walk to Encarnación and a José Bautista strikeout, Martin hit a ground ball to shortstop Andrus. Andrus flipped the ball to Odor, who recorded the out at second and then threw on to first base in an attempt to double up Martin. But the throw went wide of first, drawing Moreland off the base and allowing Martin to reach safely; in the meantime, Donaldson never stopped running from second base and he was able to score the winning run when he slid safely under Moreland's throw to the plate. Rangers manager Jeff Banister called for a video review to see if Encarnación had interfered with the throw to second but the call was upheld to end the game and series. Odor's error was the first time in MLB history that any postseason series ended on an error, and the only time until Game 4 of the 2025 NLDS. This would be the Rangers' last postseason appearance until 2023.

=== Composite line score ===
2016 ALDS (3–0): Toronto Blue Jays beat Texas Rangers

| Team | 1 | 2 | 3 | 4 | 5 | 6 | 7 | 8 | 9 | 10 | R | H | E |
|---|---|---|---|---|---|---|---|---|---|---|---|---|---|
| Toronto Blue Jays | 3 | 2 | 7 | 2 | 3 | 1 | 0 | 0 | 3 | 1 | 22 | 29 | 0 |
| Texas Rangers | 1 | 0 | 1 | 3 | 0 | 2 | 0 | 2 | 1 | 0 | 10 | 21 | 2 |
Total attendance: 145,008 Average attendance: 48,336

== Cleveland vs. Boston ==
The Red Sox–Indians series marked the fifth postseason meeting between the two teams, with each team winning two series. Their most recent meeting was in the 2007 American League Championship Series, in which the Red Sox overcame a 3–1 deficit to win the American League pennant.

=== Game 1 ===
October 6, 2016 8:08 pm (EDT) at Progressive Field in Cleveland, Ohio 73 °F (23 °C), mostly clear
| Team | 1 | 2 | 3 | 4 | 5 | 6 | 7 | 8 | 9 | R | H | E |
|---|---|---|---|---|---|---|---|---|---|---|---|---|
| Boston | 1 | 0 | 1 | 0 | 1 | 0 | 0 | 1 | 0 | 4 | 10 | 0 |
| Cleveland | 0 | 1 | 3 | 0 | 1 | 0 | 0 | 0 | X | 5 | 10 | 0 |
WP: Andrew Miller (1–0) LP: Rick Porcello (0–1) Sv: Cody Allen (1); Home runs: BOS: Andrew Benintendi (1), Sandy León (1), Brock Holt (1); CLE: Roberto Pérez (1), Jason Kipnis (1), Francisco Lindor (1); Attendance: 37,763; Boxscore

Dustin Pedroia led off Game 1 with a double to right field off Trevor Bauer, then moved to third on Brock Holt's single and scored two outs later on Hanley Ramírez's double, but Holt was thrown out trying to score, ending the inning. José Ramírez led off the bottom of the second with a double off Rick Porcello and scored on Lonnie Chisenhall's single to tie the game. Andrew Benintendi's leadoff home run in the third put the Red Sox back up 2−1, but in the bottom of the inning, home runs by Roberto Perez, Jason Kipnis, and Francisco Lindor gave the Indians a 4−2 lead. The Red Sox cut the lead to one on Sandy Leon's leadoff home run in the fifth off Bauer, who was replaced by Andrew Miller with two outs in the inning. In the bottom half, Perez hit a leadoff single, moved to second on a sacrifice fly, and scored on Kipnis's single off reliever Drew Pomeranz. Holt's leadoff home run in the eighth off Bryan Shaw made it 5−4, but Cody Allen pitched 1 1/3 shutout innings for the save.

=== Game 2 ===
October 7, 2016 4:38 pm (EDT) at Progressive Field in Cleveland, Ohio 80 °F (27 °C), clear
| Team | 1 | 2 | 3 | 4 | 5 | 6 | 7 | 8 | 9 | R | H | E |
|---|---|---|---|---|---|---|---|---|---|---|---|---|
| Boston | 0 | 0 | 0 | 0 | 0 | 0 | 0 | 0 | 0 | 0 | 3 | 1 |
| Cleveland | 0 | 4 | 0 | 1 | 0 | 1 | 0 | 0 | X | 6 | 9 | 0 |
WP: Corey Kluber (1–0) LP: David Price (0–1); Home runs: BOS: None; CLE: Lonnie Chisenhall (1); Attendance: 37,842; Boxscore

Corey Kluber pitched seven shutout innings in Game 2, allowing three hits and three walks while Dan Otero and Bryan Shaw pitched a perfect eighth and ninth, respectively. Red Sox's David Price, after a perfect first, allowed three straight one-out singles in the second, the last of which to Brandon Guyer scoring Carlos Santana, before Lonnie Chisenhall's three-run home run put the Indians up 4−0. In the fourth, Price allowed a leadoff single to Guyer, then walked Roberto Pérez with one out before being relieved by Matt Barnes. Rajai Davis hit into a forceout at third before Jason Kipnis's single scored Perez. Guyer hit a leadoff single off Barnes in the sixth, then moved to third one out later on Dustin Pedroia's fielding error before scoring on Davis's sacrifice fly off Brad Ziegler to make it 6−0 Indians, who went up two games to none in the series heading to Boston.

=== Game 3 ===
October 10, 2016 6:08 pm (EDT) at Fenway Park in Boston, Massachusetts 55 °F (13 °C), clear
| Team | 1 | 2 | 3 | 4 | 5 | 6 | 7 | 8 | 9 | R | H | E |
|---|---|---|---|---|---|---|---|---|---|---|---|---|
| Cleveland | 0 | 0 | 0 | 2 | 0 | 2 | 0 | 0 | 0 | 4 | 7 | 0 |
| Boston | 0 | 0 | 0 | 0 | 1 | 1 | 0 | 1 | 0 | 3 | 8 | 0 |
WP: Josh Tomlin (1–0) LP: Clay Buchholz (0–1) Sv: Cody Allen (2); Home runs: CLE: Coco Crisp (1); BOS: None; Attendance: 39,530; Boxscore

The Indians struck first in Game 3 off Clay Buchholz when with runners on second and third in the fourth with one out, Tyler Naquin drove them both in with a single to right field. In the fifth, Xander Bogaerts singled with one out off Josh Tomlin and scored on Andrew Benintendi's double to make it 2−1 Indians, but in the sixth, José Ramírez drew a leadoff walk off Drew Pomeranz, then Coco Crisp homered one out later to put the Indians up 4−1. Dustin Pedroia singled to lead off the bottom of the inning off Tomlin, who was relieved by Andrew Miller. Pedroia moved to third on Mookie Betts's double and scored on David Ortiz's sacrifice fly. In the eighth, pinch hitter Travis Shaw singled with one out off Bryan Shaw. After Betts hit into a force out, Cody Allen relieved Shaw and walked Ortiz before Hanley Ramírez's RBI single made it 4−3 Indians. Allen pitched a scoreless ninth despite allowing a single and walk as the Indians completed a sweep of the Red Sox. This was David Ortiz's 85th and final playoff game.

=== Composite line score ===
2016 ALDS (3–0): Cleveland Indians beat Boston Red Sox

| Team | 1 | 2 | 3 | 4 | 5 | 6 | 7 | 8 | 9 | R | H | E |
|---|---|---|---|---|---|---|---|---|---|---|---|---|
| Cleveland Indians | 0 | 5 | 3 | 3 | 1 | 3 | 0 | 0 | 0 | 15 | 26 | 0 |
| Boston Red Sox | 1 | 0 | 1 | 0 | 2 | 1 | 0 | 2 | 0 | 7 | 21 | 1 |
Total attendance: 115,135 Average attendance: 38,378

== See also ==
- 2016 National League Division Series
