= Dale Scott =

American baseball umpire (born 1959)

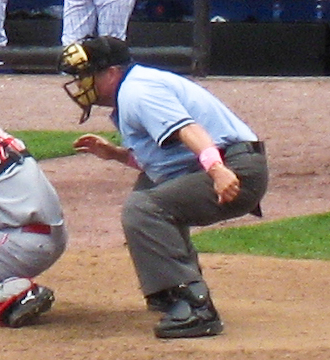
- Scott in 2008
- Born: August 14, 1959 (age 67); Eugene, Oregon, U.S.
- Occupation: MLB umpire
- Years active: 1985–2017
- Spouse: Michael Rausch

Dale Allan Scott (born August 14, 1959) is an American former umpire in Major League Baseball. He worked in the American League from 1986 to 1999, and officiated in both leagues from 2000 until his retirement after the 2017 season. He became a crew chief in 2001. He wore uniform number 39 his first two years and number 5, previously worn in the AL by Russ Goetz, thereafter.

== Umpiring career ==
Scott began umpiring at age 15 and entered the minor leagues in 1981, eventually working his way up to the Triple-A American Association. He umpired a single major league game during the 1985 MLB season, making his debut in an August 19 game between the Kansas City Royals and Detroit Tigers. Scott became a full-time MLB umpire in 1986, working 116 games that season. Scott worked a total of 3,897 regular season games, 91 post-season games, and issued 92 ejections in his MLB career.

Scott umpired in the World Series in 1998, 2001 and 2004, in the All-Star Game in 1993, 2001, and 2011, calling balls and strikes. He has also worked in six League Championship Series (1996, 1999, 2000, 2002, 2009, 2013) and in twelve Division Series (1995, 1997, 1998, 2001, 2003, 2004, 2005, 2007, 2008, 2011, 2014, 2015).

When the AL introduced red shirts in 1996, Scott frequently was the only umpire to wear the color, rather than the usual navy blue. He almost always wore the red shirt when working home plate, including Game 3 of the 1998 World Series at Qualcomm Stadium.

Scott worked his last game on April 14, 2017, in Toronto. In the 8th inning he was struck in the mask and was carted off the field with a concussion and whiplash. This was Scott's fourth concussion in five years, his second in nine months. After consulting with several sports medicine and concussion specialists, Scott decided not to return, and announced his retirement in December 2017.

=== Notable games ===
On May 30, 1988, Scott ejected New York Yankees manager Billy Martin from a game against the Oakland Athletics. Martin was suspended for three games for throwing dirt at Scott during the argument.

On July 1, 1990, Scott was the home plate umpire as Andy Hawkins of the New York Yankees pitched eight hitless innings in a road game against the Chicago White Sox, yet lost; it was, at the time, only the second game in history in which a pitcher lost a complete game no-hitter. In 1991 MLB revised the rules relating to official no-hit games, requiring that a pitcher must complete a minimum of 9 innings, and thereby voiding Hawkins' effort.

He was the home plate umpire on April 27, 1994, when Scott Erickson threw a no-hitter for the Twins vs the Brewers.

Scott was the first base umpire when Detroit Tigers pitcher Justin Verlander threw a no-hitter at Comerica Park against the Milwaukee Brewers on June 12, 2007. Five days prior to Verlander's no-hitter, Scott was also at first base in a game between the Boston Red Sox and the Oakland Athletics in which Boston pitcher Curt Schilling had a no-hitter until Shannon Stewart broke up the no-hitter with a single with two outs in the bottom of the ninth inning.

Scott worked his 3,000th career regular season MLB game in St. Louis on his 50th birthday, August 14, 2009.

He was the third base umpire for Verlander's second no-hitter, thrown on May 7, 2011, against the Toronto Blue Jays.

Scott was the third base umpire when six Seattle Mariners pitchers combined to no-hit the Los Angeles Dodgers on June 8, 2012.

He was the second-most tenured umpire selected to officiate the 2014 Opening Series at the Sydney Cricket Ground in Sydney.

Scott was the crew chief for the 2015 American League Division Series between the Toronto Blue Jays and Texas Rangers. He was home plate umpire for game five, in which a controversial moment took place. At the top of the seventh inning, Toronto catcher Russell Martin was in the process of throwing the ball back to pitcher Aaron Sanchez when his throw struck the bat of Texas batter Shin-Soo Choo. Rougned Odor, who was the runner on third, ran home on the play. Scott initially called the play dead and disallowed the run. After a consultation with the other umpires, Scott reversed the decision and allowed the run to count on the grounds that Choo didn't intentionally interfere with the throw, and therefore the play was live. This gave the Rangers a lead. Toronto manager John Gibbons advised Scott the Blue Jays were playing under protest, however Toronto would ultimately win the game.

On May 15, 2016, Scott was the crew chief and first base umpire when the Toronto Blue Jays visited the Texas Rangers. This game was the final regular season game between the teams that met in the previous year’s Division Series. Late in the game, a fight broke out between Blue Jays outfielder José Bautista and Rangers second baseman Rougned Odor when Bautista slid late into second base. Scott and home plate umpire Dan Iassogna ejected Bautista, Odor, Blue Jays third baseman Josh Donaldson, Rangers bench coach Steve Buechele, Blue Jays pitcher Jesse Chavez, and bench coach/acting manager DeMarlo Hale. Hale was acting as the Blue Jays’ manager due to the ejection of John Gibbons (along with first base coach Tim Leiper) earlier in the game. Odor and Bautista both served suspensions for their actions. There were a total of eight ejections, the most in a single game since 2000.

== Personal life ==
Scott worked as a radio personality at KBDF, a Top 40 station in Eugene, Oregon, in the late 1970s. He is an avid Oregon Ducks football fan and often attends games at Autzen Stadium when given the opportunity. He is friends with baseball commentator Harold Reynolds.

Scott came out as gay in 2014, becoming the first active openly gay umpire in the MLB, which also made him the first out active male official in either the NBA, NHL, NFL or the MLB. He is married to Michael Rausch, whom he met at CC Slaughters in Portland in October 1986.

In 2015, Scott was inducted into the National Gay and Lesbian Sports Hall of Fame, and to the Hall of Honor at Sheldon High School in his hometown of Eugene.

In 2022, Scott published his memoir The Umpire Is Out: Calling the Game and Living My True Self, co-written with Rob Neyer.

== See also ==
- List of LGBT people from Portland, Oregon
- List of LGBT sportspeople
- List of Major League Baseball umpires (disambiguation)
