= 2015 American League Wild Card Game =

	1	2	3	4	5	6	7	8	9	R	H	E
Houston Astros	0	1	0	1	0	0	1	0	0	3	5	0
New York Yankees	0	0	0	0	0	0	0	0	0	0	3	0
- Date: October 6, 2015
- Venue: Yankee Stadium
- City: The Bronx, New York
- Managers: A. J. Hinch (Houston Astros); Joe Girardi (New York Yankees)
- Umpires: Ted Barrett (crew chief), Eric Cooper, Paul Emmel, Bill Miller, Chris Conroy, Manny Gonzalez
- Attendance: 50,113
- Television: ESPN
- TV announcers: Dan Shulman, John Kruk, Jessica Mendoza, Buster Olney, and Tim Kurkjian
- Radio: ESPN
- Radio announcers: Dave O'Brien and Aaron Boone

The 2015 American League Wild Card Game was a play-in game during Major League Baseball's (MLB) 2015 postseason played between the American League's (AL) two wild card teams, the New York Yankees and the Houston Astros. It was held at Yankee Stadium on October 6, 2015.

The Astros defeated the Yankees, 3–0. It was the Astros' first playoff win since Game 6 of the 2005 NLCS and their first victory in a winner-take-all postseason game since Game 5 of the 2004 NLDS. With the Yankees eliminated, all four remaining teams in the 2015 ALDS were expansion teams.

== Background ==
The Yankees clinched a wild card berth on October 1, while the Astros clinched a wild card berth on October 4, the final day of the regular season. The Yankees hosted the game, as they finished the regular season with a better win–loss record. This was the Astros' first postseason appearance as an AL team, and first overall since 2005, while the Yankees appeared in the postseason for the first time since 2012. As such, this was the first postseason meeting between the Astros and the Yankees.

== Game results ==
=== Line score ===
October 6, 2015 8:10 pm (EDT) at Yankee Stadium in Bronx, New York, 67 °F (19 °C), partly cloudy
Team	1	2	3	4	5	6	7	8	9	R	H	E
Houston	0	1	0	1	0	0	1	0	0	3	5	0
New York	0	0	0	0	0	0	0	0	0	0	3	0
WP: Dallas Keuchel (1–0) LP: Masahiro Tanaka (0–1) Sv: Luke Gregerson (1); Home runs: HOU: Colby Rasmus (1), Carlos Gómez (1); NYY: None; Attendance: 50,113; Boxscore

Houston's Dallas Keuchel struck out seven batters and allowed only three hits in six innings of work, at one point retiring ten batters in a row before the Yankees had their one key threat come in the 6th with two base runners before a flyout to centerfield ended the threat. The Astros' bullpen then retired nine of ten Yankee batters for the victory. The Astros were paced offensively by leadoff home runs by Colby Rasmus in the second inning and Carlos Gómez in the fourth, as New York starter Masahiro Tanaka struggled to find command of his pitches. Tanaka lasted five innings, striking out three.

Houston's Jose Altuve scored Jonathan Villar from second base in the seventh inning against Yankee reliever Dellin Betances, the final run of the game. Both teams had five runners left on base, but the Yankees never saw a runner touch third base.
