= Bat flip =

Baseball flourish

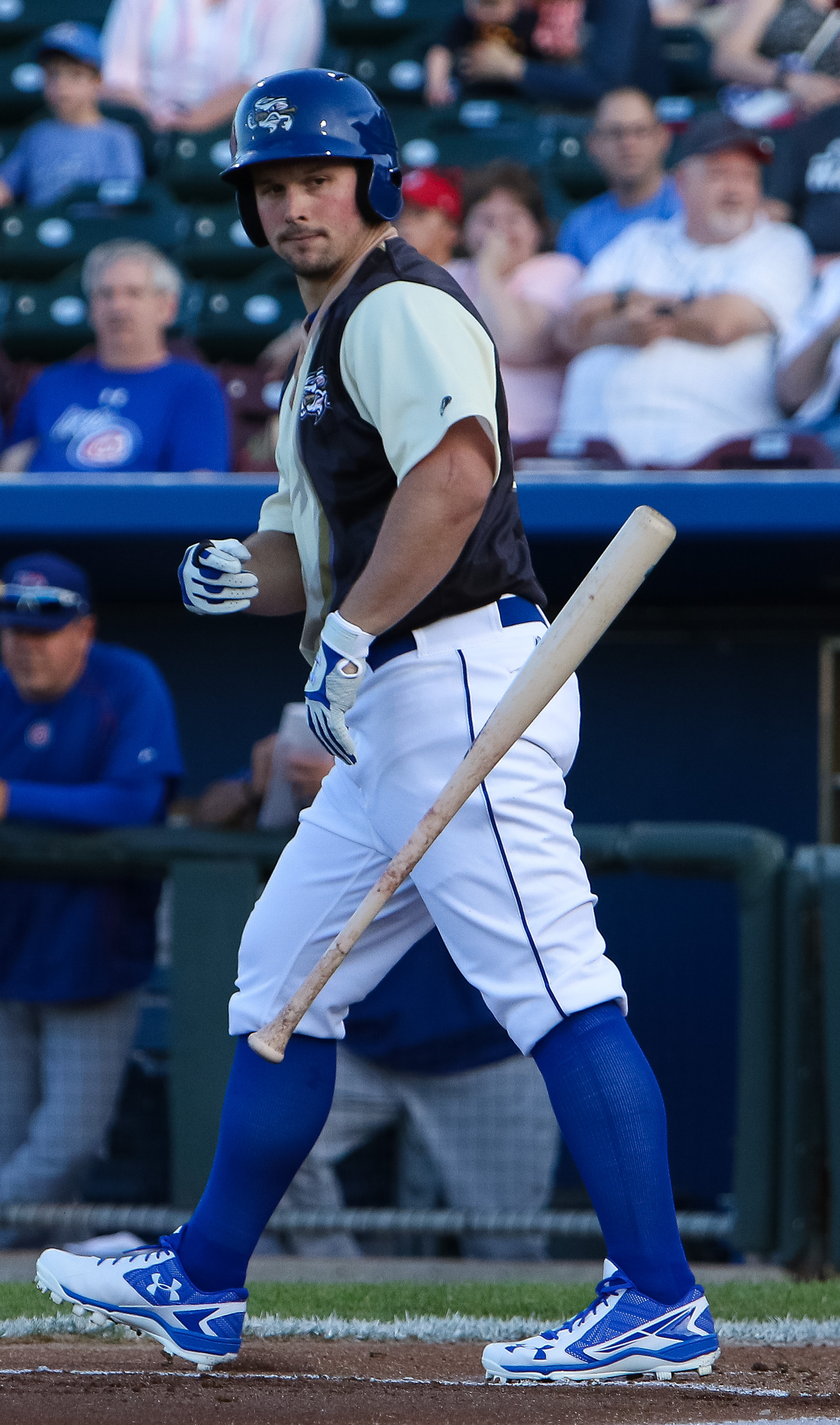
A baseball bat rotating in the air as the result of a bat flip

In baseball, a bat flip is the throwing of a baseball bat after a hit so that it travels an unusual distance or rotates more than once before landing. It is typically done by a batter to show off after hitting a home run, and contrasts with the usual practice of simply dropping the bat as the batter begins running to first base.

== Asia and Latin America ==
Bat flipping is popular in Asian and Latin American baseball leagues. In South Korea, the bat flipping tradition dates to the 1990s, and has become increasingly frequent in the Korea Baseball Organization. It is not considered disrespectful and there is no retaliation in the Korean League. In the Korean language, bat flips are referred as ppa-dun (Korean: 빠던), a portmanteau of the first syllables of the words for "bat" and "throw". The practice is also common in Japan and Taiwan.

== Canada and the United States ==
In Canada and the United States, bat flips have traditionally been considered rude and inconsistent with baseball etiquette. Traditional etiquette and the unwritten rules of baseball espouse humility and discourage actions that may be interpreted as arrogant or showing up the opponents. Torii Hunter, a retired Major League Baseball player and fan of bat flips in Korean baseball, has said that a player throwing a bat in such a manner during a game in the United States would likely face retaliation in a subsequent at bat, such as being hit by a pitch. In April 2015, Los Angeles Dodgers right fielder Yasiel Puig said that he would flip his bat less frequently because he wanted "to show American baseball that [he's] not disrespecting the game."

However, bat flips can also be seen as creative and exciting There has also been criticism of criticism about bat flips given how they are often celebrated by leagues for promotional purposes.

=== José Bautista bat flip ===
During Game 5 of the 2015 American League Division Series between the Texas Rangers and the Toronto Blue Jays, Toronto outfielder José Bautista executed what Andrew Keh of The New York Times described as possibly "the most ostentatious bat flip in MLB history" after hitting a go-ahead, three-run home run off Rangers relief pitcher Sam Dyson. The benches cleared twice in that inning after the home run. Bautista was criticized for the bat flip, which he attributed to a failure to understand differences in cultural backgrounds of players, and he said the flip was unplanned and was "caught up in the emotion of the moment". Emotions among players and fans had already been high prior to Bautista's bat flip, as earlier in that inning a routine toss from Russell Martin, the Toronto catcher, back to pitcher Aaron Sanchez unintentionally struck the bat of Texas's Shin-Soo Choo which allowed Rougned Odor to run home to score the go-ahead run, causing an 18 minute delay as angry Toronto fans tossed beer cans and garbage onto the field while video review overturned the call on the field and confirmed Odor's run.

The Bautista bat flip became an internet meme. Fans posted numerous responses to the event on Twitter, and shared videos on Vine and other social media websites and mobile apps. It was etched onto jack-o'-lanterns for Halloween, printed on T-shirts and Christmas sweaters, and was also featured on a thigh tattoo for an Oshawa, Ontario man. It was commemorated on a Topps 2016 Series 1 baseball card. A corn maze in the Canadian province of New Brunswick was designed with the likeness of the Bautista bat flip.

The bat flip fueled the rivalry between Toronto and Texas. Presumably in retaliation for the bat flip, Texas pitcher Matt Bush hit Bautista with a pitch in the eighth inning of a game on May 15, 2016. Shortly after being hit by the pitch, Bautista made a late slide in an attempt to break up a double play (the variety of which had been made illegal after a separate incident during a National League Division Series game in the same postseason as the bat flip) into Texas second baseman Rougned Odor. Odor took exception to the slide and shoved Bautista. Bautista stepped toward Odor and cocked his arm, and in self-defense Odor punched Bautista in the face, knocking his glasses and helmet off. Odor received an eight-game suspension (later reduced to seven) and Bautista was suspended for one game. Like the bat flip, images of the punch caused an internet meme. Fans posted numerous images and references on Twitter, Vine, Reddit, and other social media websites. Odor has declined to sign images of the punch.

The two teams faced each other in the ALDS again in 2016, and the Blue Jays won in a 3-game sweep; in Game 1, Bautista hit a three-run home run and then emphatically slammed down the bat in celebration.

== Cricket ==
In cricket, the term bat flip refers to the tossing of a bat, instead of a coin, to decide which of the 2 teams in a match will be given the option to decide whether it wants to bat or bowl first. Additionally, instead of calling "heads" or "tails", the player calling the toss will call "hills" or "flats" depending on which side of the bat they think will land facing up (i.e., the flat side of the bat or the raised side of the bat).
