= 2015 American League Division Series =

Teams
Team (Wins)		Manager	Season
Kansas City Royals (3)		Ned Yost	95–67 (.586), GA: 12
Houston Astros (2)		A. J. Hinch	86–76 (.531), GB: 2
- Dates: October 8–14
- Television: United States: FS1 (Games 1–2, 4–5) MLB Network (Game 3); Canada: Sportsnet (simulcast of FS1 games)
- TV announcers: Matt Vasgersian, John Smoltz, A. J. Pierzynski (Games 1–2, 4–5), and J. P. Morosi
- Radio: ESPN
- Radio announcers: Dave O' Brien and John Kruk
- Umpires: Gerry Davis (crew chief), Lance Barksdale, Mike Everitt, Ángel Hernández, Ron Kulpa, Todd Tichenor

Teams
Team (Wins)		Manager	Season
Toronto Blue Jays (3)		John Gibbons	93–69 (.574), GA: 6
Texas Rangers (2)		Jeff Banister	88–74 (.543), GA: 2
- Dates: October 8–14
- Television: United States: FS1 (Games 1, 3–5) MLB Network (Game 2); Canada: Sportsnet
- TV announcers: Kenny Albert, Harold Reynolds, Tom Verducci, and Ken Rosenthal (FS1); Bob Costas, Jim Kaat, and Ken Rosenthal (MLBN)
- Radio: ESPN
- Radio announcers: Chris Berman (Games 1–2), Dave Flemming (Games 3–4), Dan Shulman (Game 5), and Rick Sutcliffe
- Umpires: Dale Scott (crew chief), Dan Bellino, Vic Carapazza, James Hoye, Marvin Hudson, Alfonso Márquez
- ALWC: Houston Astros defeated New York Yankees, 3–0

The 2015 American League Division Series were two best-of-five playoff series in Major League Baseball’s (MLB) 2015 postseason to determine the participating teams in the 2015 American League Championship Series. The three divisional winners (seeded 1–3) and a fourth team—the winner of a one-game Wild Card playoff— played in two series. Fox Sports 1 carried the majority of games in the United States, while Sportsnet primarily simulcast Fox Sports 1's coverage in Canada. MLB Network had exclusive coverage of Game 3 of the Kansas City Royals–Houston Astros series in both the United States and Canada, and Game 2 of the Toronto Blue Jays–Texas Rangers series in the U.S. only (Sportsnet, co-owned with the Blue Jays by Rogers Communications, simulcast MLB Network's coverage for the latter). The ALDS began on October 8 and ran until October 14. The Toronto Blue Jays and Kansas City Royals had home field advantage in this round of the playoffs. With the New York Yankees being eliminated by the Astros in the AL Wild Card Game, this is the first time in ALDS history that all four ALDS teams were expansion teams.

These matchups were:

- (1) Kansas City Royals (AL Central champions) vs. (5) Houston Astros (Wild Card Game winner): Royals won the series, 3–2.
- (2) Toronto Blue Jays (AL East champions) vs. (3) Texas Rangers (AL West champions): Blue Jays won the series, 3–2.

The higher seeded team in each series hosted Games 1, 2, and 5 (if necessary), and the lower seeded team hosted Games 3 and 4 (if necessary).

This was the first ALDS appearance for both the Astros and Blue Jays. Toronto's last postseason berth came in 1993, the final season of the two-round playoff format. Houston, on the other hand, made its first playoff appearance as an American League team; the franchise's preceding postseason berth came in 2005 while a member of the National League. The Blue Jays and the Rangers, and the Astros and the Royals, met for the first time in postseason play.

This was the second time (and first since 2001) that both ALDS winners overcame a 2–1 series deficit to advance to the ALCS.

The Royals would go on to defeat the Blue Jays in the ALCS, then win the 2015 World Series over the National League champion New York Mets, the Royals first World Series title since 1985.

== Matchups ==
=== Kansas City Royals vs. Houston Astros ===
Kansas City won the series, 3–2.

Game	Date	Score	Location	Time	Attendance
1	October 8	Houston Astros – 5, Kansas City Royals – 2	Kauffman Stadium	3:14 (:49 delay)	40,146
2	October 9	Houston Astros – 4, Kansas City Royals – 5	Kauffman Stadium	3:27	40,008
3	October 11	Kansas City Royals – 2, Houston Astros – 4	Minute Maid Park	3:20	42,674
4	October 12	Kansas City Royals – 9, Houston Astros – 6	Minute Maid Park	4:05	42,387
5	October 14	Houston Astros – 2, Kansas City Royals – 7	Kauffman Stadium	2:42	40,566

=== Toronto Blue Jays vs. Texas Rangers ===
Toronto won the series, 3–2.

Game	Date	Score	Location	Time	Attendance
1	October 8	Texas Rangers – 5, Toronto Blue Jays – 3	Rogers Centre	2:53	49,834
2	October 9	Texas Rangers – 6, Toronto Blue Jays – 4 (14)	Rogers Centre	4:57	49,716
3	October 11	Toronto Blue Jays − 5, Texas Rangers − 1	Globe Life Park	3:08	50,941
4	October 12	Toronto Blue Jays − 8, Texas Rangers − 4	Globe Life Park	3:18	47,679
5	October 14	Texas Rangers − 3, Toronto Blue Jays − 6	Rogers Centre	3:37	49,742

== Houston vs. Kansas City ==
=== Game 1 ===
October 8, 2015 6:37 p.m. (CDT) at Kauffman Stadium in Kansas City, Missouri 82 °F (28 °C), partly cloudy w/ passing shower
Team	1	2	3	4	5	6	7	8	9	R	H	E
Houston	2	1	0	0	1	0	0	1	0	5	11	0
Kansas City	0	1	0	1	0	0	0	0	0	2	6	0
WP: Collin McHugh (1–0) LP: Yordano Ventura (0–1) Sv: Luke Gregerson (1); Home runs: HOU: Colby Rasmus (1), George Springer (1); KC: Kendrys Morales 2 (2); Attendance: 40,146; Boxscore

The Astros quickly quieted a raucous Kansas City crowd by scoring two runs in the 1st inning, both coming on RBI groundouts from Colby Rasmus and Evan Gattis respectively. Jose Altuve would add an RBI single in the next inning to give Houston a 3–0 lead. Kendrys Morales would get the Royals on the board with a home run in the bottom of the frame to make it 3–1. A 49-minute no-dome delay prompted Kansas City manager Ned Yost to pull starter Yordano Ventura from the game, while Houston stuck with Collin McHugh who would only surrender another shot from Morales in the 4th in six innings. The Astros bullpen would shut out Kansas City from there while George Springer and Rasmus would add shots to provide Houston with all the insurance runs they would need to steal home field advantage from the Royals in taking a 1–0 series lead.

=== Game 2 ===
October 9, 2015 2:45 p.m. (CDT) at Kauffman Stadium in Kansas City, Missouri 57 °F (14 °C), cloudy
Team	1	2	3	4	5	6	7	8	9	R	H	E
Houston	1	2	1	0	0	0	0	0	0	4	8	0
Kansas City	0	1	1	0	0	2	1	0	X	5	9	0
WP: Kelvin Herrera (1–0) LP: Will Harris (0–1) Sv: Wade Davis (1); Home runs: HOU: Colby Rasmus (2); KC: Salvador Pérez (1); Attendance: 40,008; Boxscore

Early on, this game looked like a mirror image of the first game with Houston taking a quick 3–0 lead in the first two innings on an RBI double from Colby Rasmus in the 1st, and then a two-run single from George Springer in the 2nd. Just like Game 1, Kansas City added a home run in the bottom of the 2nd, this time from Salvador Pérez to make it 3-1 heading into the third inning.Rasmus continued his hot hitting in that inning with a home run to give the Astros a 4–1 lead, but in the bottom of the frame the Royals got the run back when Ben Zobrist grounded into a double play, which scored Alex Ríos from 3rd base to make it 4–2.

The score would remain 4-2 until the bottom of the sixth, where the Royals mustered the first of their many comebacks of this postseason. With the Astros threatening to take a 2–0 series lead back to Houston, where the Royals would have to face eventual AL Cy Young winner Dallas Keuchel, Lorenzo Cain got a rally started with a double. Eric Hosmer then drove him in with an RBI single. Two batters later, with the bases now loaded, the Astros brought in Josh Fields to face Perez. Fields threw four straight balls to walk in the game-tying run. Fields did recover and struck out the next two batters to get out of the jam, but now the game was tied at four.

In the bottom of the 7th, Will Harris relieved Fields, but surrendered an immediate triple to Alcides Escobar. Zobrist then drove in Escobar with an RBI single to give Kansas City the 5–4 lead. That was all the vaunted Royals bullpen needed as Ryan Madson and Wade Davis pitched scoreless 8th and 9th innings respectively to even the series.

=== Game 3 ===
October 11, 2015 3:10 p.m. (CDT) at Minute Maid Park in Houston, Texas 73 °F (23 °C), roof closed
Team	1	2	3	4	5	6	7	8	9	R	H	E
Kansas City	0	0	0	1	0	0	0	0	1	2	5	0
Houston	0	0	0	0	2	1	1	0	X	4	8	1
WP: Dallas Keuchel (1–0) LP: Edinson Vólquez (0–1) Sv: Luke Gregerson (2); Home runs: KC: Lorenzo Cain (1), Alex Gordon (1); HOU: Chris Carter (1); Attendance: 42,674; Boxscore

Dallas Keuchel had assembled a perfect 15–0 record at Minute Maid Park during the regular season, and he continued his winning ways with another win in Game 3. It was initially a pitchers' duel between Keuchel and Edinson Vólquez until Keuchel surrendered his only run of the game on a Lorenzo Cain home run. The Royals' lead didn't last long though, as in the bottom of the 5th, catcher Jason Castro, not known for his hitting, got a hold of a 1-out, 2-strike pitch for a two-run single up the middle for the first postseason hit of his career. Carlos Gómez added an RBI single in the 6th, and Chris Carter added a homer in the 7th on his way to a 3-hit night. Closer Luke Gregerson surrendered a home run to Alex Gordon in the 9th, but he closed out the Royals from there to put the Astros one win away from advancing to the 2015 ALCS.

=== Game 4 ===
October 12, 2015 12:07 p.m. (CDT) at Minute Maid Park in Houston, Texas 73 °F (23 °C), roof closed
Team	1	2	3	4	5	6	7	8	9	R	H	E
Kansas City	0	2	0	0	0	0	0	5	2	9	8	0
Houston	0	1	1	0	1	0	3	0	0	6	9	1
WP: Ryan Madson (1–0) LP: Tony Sipp (0–1) Sv: Wade Davis (2); Home runs: KC: Salvador Pérez (2), Eric Hosmer (1); HOU: Carlos Gómez (1), Carlos Correa 2 (2), Colby Rasmus (3); Attendance: 42,387; Boxscore

Kansas City opened the scoring of this game with a 2-run homer from Salvador Pérez in the top of the 2nd. However, Carlos Gómez and Carlos Correa hit home runs in the bottom of the 2nd and 3rd innings respectively to tie the game. Correa would drive in another run in the 5th with a double to give Houston a 3–2 lead. Then in the 7th, Correa hit another home run, this time driving in 2 runs, followed immediately by a Colby Rasmus home run to give the Astros a lead of 6–2.

Now trailing by four runs and six outs away from being eliminated from the postseason, Kansas City opened the eighth with five straight singles off relievers Will Harris and Tony Sipp, with RBI hits by Lorenzo Cain and Eric Hosmer making it 6–4 and loading the bases with no outs. Kendrys Morales followed with a hard, one-bouncer off Sipp's glove. The ball took two more hops and got past the top of Carlos Correa's mitt, rolling into center field as two runs scored to tie it at six. Alex Gordon's RBI groundout off Luke Gregerson later in the inning put Kansas City ahead. Hosmer launched a two-run homer in the ninth and Wade Davis pitched a 2-inning save to save the Royals' season.

This marked the second time in franchise history that Kansas City had rallied from a four-run deficit after seven innings to win a postseason game. The first came in 2014, when the Royals trailed the Oakland Athletics 7–3 in the eighth of their AL Wild Card Game before eventually winning in the 12th. These are the only two instances in Major League history of a team taking a must-win game after trailing by four runs after seven innings., though the Boston Red Sox trailed by seven runs in the middle of the seventh inning while on the brink of elimination in Game 5 of the 2008 American League Championship Series.

=== Game 5 ===
October 14, 2015 7:07 p.m. (CDT) at Kauffman Stadium in Kansas City, Missouri 66 °F (19 °C), clear
Team	1	2	3	4	5	6	7	8	9	R	H	E
Houston	0	2	0	0	0	0	0	0	0	2	2	0
Kansas City	0	0	0	1	3	0	0	3	X	7	8	0
WP: Johnny Cueto (1–0) LP: Collin McHugh (1–1); Home runs: HOU: Luis Valbuena (1); KC: Kendrys Morales (3); Attendance: 40,566; Boxscore

Johnny Cueto was two pitches away from potentially having a perfect game. The first was a pitch that Evan Gattis hit down the left field line and was fielded by Mike Moustakas in foul territory. Had Moustakas had a clean throw to first base, Kansas City would have been out of the inning, but Moustakas' throw was off the mark, bringing first baseman Eric Hosmer off the bag, and Hosmer couldn't hang onto the ball to tag out Gattis, thus giving Gattis a base hit. On the next pitch, Luis Valbuena sent the ball into the Astros bullpen for a two-run home run. That would be the last baserunner Cueto would allow, as he retired the last nineteen Astros batters he faced. Cueto became the first pitcher to retire the last nineteen batters he faced in a postseason game since Roy Halladay's no-hitter in 2010 where he retired 21 in a row.

In the 4th, Lorenzo Cain reached base on a single. Then Hosmer hit a single to center field with Cain running on the pitch. Center fielder Carlos Gómez slipped onto his backside when he fielded the ball, which allowed Cain to go all the way home to make it a 2–1 game. This would be the first of two times during the postseason that Cain would score from 1st base on a single from Hosmer.

In the 5th, Salvador Pérez reached base when he was hit by a Collin McHugh pitch. The next batter, Alex Gordon hit a ball to deep right-center field, which bounced into the stands for a ground rule double to put runners on 2nd and 3rd. At this point Houston brought in Mike Fiers to replace McHugh on the mound to face Alex Ríos. On a 1-1 pitch, Rios hit the ball down the left-field line that got by the third baseman for a double to score both runners and give Kansas City a 3–2 lead. Alcides Escobar then bunted Rios to third for the first out of the inning. Ben Zobrist then hit a ball to right-center field, which was enough to get Rios home with a sacrifice fly to give the Royals a 4–2 lead.

Dallas Keuchel was brought in for a relief appearance on just two days of rest in the 8th inning and quickly surrendered a double to Escobar down the right-field line. After Zobrist lined out to Jose Altuve at second base, Keuchel intentionally walked Cain to put runners on first and second base. Hosmer popped out for the second out to bring up Kendrys Morales. Keuchel worked a 1-2 count when he just missed outside to make it a 2-2 count. On the next pitch, Morales lined the ball to the left-center field bleachers for a three-run home run to just about put the game away. Wade Davis pitched a perfect ninth with Paulo Orlando making the final out with a catch against the wall to send the Royals to back-to-back ALCS appearances for the first time since the 1984 and 1985 teams did so.

=== Composite line score ===
2015 ALDS (3–2): Kansas City Royals beat Houston Astros

Team	1	2	3	4	5	6	7	8	9	R	H	E
Kansas City Royals	0	4	1	3	3	2	1	8	3	25	36	0
Houston Astros	3	6	2	0	4	1	4	1	0	21	38	2
Total attendance: 205,781 Average attendance: 41,156

== Toronto vs. Texas ==
=== Game 1 ===
October 8, 2015 3:37 p.m. (EDT) at Rogers Centre in Toronto, Ontario 73 °F (23 °C), roof closed
Team	1	2	3	4	5	6	7	8	9	R	H	E
Texas	0	0	2	0	2	0	1	0	0	5	5	0
Toronto	0	0	0	1	1	1	0	0	0	3	6	1
WP: Yovani Gallardo (1–0) LP: David Price (0–1) Sv: Sam Dyson (1); Home runs: TEX: Robinson Chirinos (1), Rougned Odor (1); TOR: José Bautista (1); Attendance: 49,834; Boxscore

David Price took the mound in search of his first playoff win as a starter, and coming into the game he was 0–3 lifetime against the Texas Rangers in the postseason. Opposing him was Yovani Gallardo, who provided the Rangers with their only two victories against Toronto in the regular season, and had been one of the few starters in the majors who had been able to shut down the Blue Jays' bats. In the top of the third inning, Price hit leadoff hitter Rougned Odor with a pitch. One out later, Delino DeShields hit a single up the middle scoring Odor for the first run of the game. A few batters later, Adrián Beltré gave Texas a 2–0 lead with an RBI single. The Blue Jays cut the lead in half in the fourth thanks to an infield single by Edwin Encarnación scoring Ben Revere. After Price once again hit Odor in the top of the fifth inning, Robinson Chirinos hit a fly ball home run to give the Rangers a 4–1 lead. The Blue Jays would claw back to within a run before Odor hit a line drive home run into the visitor's bullpen in right field, giving the Rangers breathing room and the eventual 5–3 win. The injury bug hit both clubs, as Beltre was forced to leave due to a nagging back injury and was replaced by Hanser Alberto. Josh Donaldson left in the fifth inning with a possible concussion, after being hit by the knee of Odor after a slide during an attempted double play, and José Bautista left in the top of the ninth due to a hamstring cramp.

=== Game 2 ===
October 9, 2015 12:45 p.m. (EDT) at Rogers Centre in Toronto, Ontario 73 °F (23 °C), roof closed
Team	1	2	3	4	5	6	7	8	9	10	11	12	13	14	R	H	E
Texas	2	1	0	0	0	0	0	1	0	0	0	0	0	2	6	11	1
Toronto	1	2	0	0	1	0	0	0	0	0	0	0	0	0	4	8	1
WP: Keone Kela (1–0) LP: LaTroy Hawkins (0–1) Sv: Ross Ohlendorf (1); Home runs: TEX: None; TOR: Josh Donaldson (1); Attendance: 49,716; Boxscore

Delino DeShields doubled to lead off the game off of Marcus Stroman, then scored on Shin-Soo Choo's single. After a Prince Fielder single moved Choo to third, catcher Russell Martin's error on Mitch Moreland's fielder's choice made it 2–0 Rangers. The Blue Jays cut it to 2–1 on Josh Donaldson's one-out home run in the bottom of the inning off of Cole Hamels. In the top of the second, Rougned Odor drew a leadoff walk, moved to third on a groundout and scored on Hanser Alberto's sacrifice fly. In the bottom of the inning, with runners on second and third on an error and double, Martin's single and Kevin Pillar's double scored a run each, tying the game. In the fifth, Pillar hit a leadoff double, moved to third on a sacrifice bunt, and scored on Ben Revere's single to give the Blue Jays the lead. DeShields singled to lead off the top of the eighth. Brett Cecil relieved Stroman and allowed a sacrifice bunt, then a strikeout before Mike Napoli's pinch-hit RBI single tied the game, which went into extra innings. In the top of the 14th, LaTroy Hawkins allowed three straight two-out singles, the last of which to Alberto scoring a run. Liam Hendriks relieved Hawkins and allowed an RBI single to DeShields. Ross Ohlendorf pitched a scoreless bottom of the inning for the save as the Rangers took a 2–0 series lead heading to Arlington. The contest was the fourth longest (in terms of innings played) in Division Series history, and the second-longest in ALDS history.

=== Game 3 ===
October 11, 2015 8:10 p.m. (EDT) at Globe Life Park in Arlington, Texas 89 °F (32 °C), clear
Team	1	2	3	4	5	6	7	8	9	R	H	E
Toronto	0	0	1	1	0	3	0	0	0	5	9	1
Texas	0	0	0	0	0	0	1	0	0	1	5	1
WP: Marco Estrada (1−0) LP: Martín Pérez (0−1); Home runs: TOR: Troy Tulowitzki (1); TEX: None; Attendance: 50,941; Boxscore

In a do-or-die Game 3, the Blue Jays sent Marco Estrada to the hill. Opposing him was Martín Pérez, making his first career start and appearance against the Blue Jays. Estrada was sharp throughout his start, only running into trouble late. Perez lost control of the strike zone in the fourth inning after intentionally walking Edwin Encarnación, and he eventually gave up a walk to Troy Tulowitzki making it 2–0 Jays before getting a double play ball off the bat of Dioner Navarro to end the inning. In the sixth inning, Perez got into trouble again after two straight singles by Josh Donaldson and José Bautista, forcing the Rangers to go to Chi Chi Gonzalez to try to end the threat. After walking Edwin Encarnación and loading the bases with nobody out, the Blue Jays bad luck struck again as Chris Colabello hit a ball right to first baseman Mitch Moreland, who completed a 3-2-3 double play to put the Blue Jays' rally in jeopardy. The next batter in the inning, Tulowitzki, worked Gonzalez to a full count and then on the sixth pitch drilled a three-run home run that broke the game open. The Rangers only threatened in the seventh inning, and Estrada was pulled after back-to-back hits by Elvis Andrus and Josh Hamilton with one out. The Blue Jays went to Aaron Loup for a favorable lefty-lefty matchup which resulted in an RBI groundout by Rougned Odor. The Blue Jays then went to Mark Lowe to face Robinson Chirinos who worked him to a full count and then on the eighth pitch of the at-bat caught Chirinos looking to end the inning, Roberto Osuna came on and pitched a perfect ninth as Toronto forced Game 4.

=== Game 4 ===
October 12, 2015 4:07 p.m. (EDT) at Globe Life Park in Arlington, Texas 93 °F (34 °C), clear
Team	1	2	3	4	5	6	7	8	9	R	H	E
Toronto	3	1	3	0	0	0	1	0	0	8	12	0
Texas	0	0	1	0	0	0	1	2	0	4	11	0
WP: David Price (1−1) LP: Derek Holland (0−1); Home runs: TOR: Josh Donaldson (2), Chris Colabello (1), Kevin Pillar (1); TEX: None; Attendance: 47,679; Boxscore

After the Blue Jays forced Game 4, the Rangers turned to Derek Holland to end the series. Opposing him was knuckleballer R. A. Dickey, making his first postseason start. The Blue Jays jumped on Holland for three runs in the first inning on a single by Ben Revere and home runs by Josh Donaldson and Chris Colabello. A Kevin Pillar home run in the second inning made it 4−0 Toronto. A walk by Donaldson and a double by José Bautista chased Holland and put runners on second and third with no one out. Colby Lewis came on in relief of Holland and allowed a fielder's choice ground out from Edwin Encarnación, getting Bautista out at third but allowing Donaldson to score to make it 5−0. A double by Colabello scored Encarnacion to make it 6–0. A fly ball by Troy Tulowitzki was the second out, Russell Martin walked and Pillar struck an RBI single to score Colabello and make it 7−0 after three innings. In the bottom of the third, Shin-Soo Choo scored on a wild pitch from Dickey to cut the lead to six, but that was the only run Dickey would allow in 4 2/3 innings. David Price relieved Dickey and got Shin-Soo Choo to fly out on his first pitch to end the fifth. In the seventh, another RBI single by Pillar scored Martin and pushed the lead back to seven runs. The Rangers tried to chip away at the lead, scoring a run in the seventh and two more in the eighth off Price to cut the lead to four runs, but Aaron Sanchez came on and struck out Drew Stubbs to end the threat. Osuna retired the Rangers in order in the ninth inning to force a game 5 back in Toronto.

=== Game 5 ===
October 14, 2015 4:07 p.m. (EDT) at Rogers Centre in Toronto, Ontario 73 °F (23 °C), roof closed
Team	1	2	3	4	5	6	7	8	9	R	H	E
Texas	1	0	1	0	0	0	1	0	0	3	8	3
Toronto	0	0	1	0	0	1	4	0	X	6	7	1
WP: Aaron Sanchez (1–0) LP: Cole Hamels (0–1) Sv: Roberto Osuna (1); Home runs: TEX: Shin-Soo Choo (1); TOR: Edwin Encarnación (1), José Bautista (2); Attendance: 49,742; Boxscore

Prior to the loser-go-home deciding Game 5 between the Blue Jays and Rangers, thousands of fans signed a petition to play the game with the Rogers Centre's retractable roof open. The dome was kept closed due to fears that operating the roof during cold temperatures would cause it to be stuck in the open position.

An RBI single by Prince Fielder in the first and a homer by Shin-Soo Choo in the third gave the Rangers an early lead over Marcus Stroman and the Blue Jays. The Blue Jays fought back to tie it with an RBI double by José Bautista in the third and a home run by Edwin Encarnación in the sixth.

The 53-minute seventh inning was laden with controversy. In the top of the inning, with Rougned Odor on third and two outs, Russell Martin was in the process of throwing the ball back to the mound after Aaron Sanchez delivered a pitch, but the ball hit Choo's bat and bounced toward third base. Observing this, Odor ran home to score the go-ahead run, though the play was initially ruled a dead ball by home plate umpire Dale Scott and the run was voided. Rangers manager Jeff Banister came out to argue and after a discussion, the umpires awarded the run to Texas, citing rule 6.03a – that Choo was not intentionally interfering with the throw back to the pitcher. Since Choo was in the batter's box, interference could not be called, and the play was ruled a live ball. The game was delayed 18 minutes as angry home fans tossed beer cans and garbage onto the field. During this time, a video review from the umpires was on confirming with a rules check, and Blue Jays manager John Gibbons announced he was playing the game under protest.

The turning point in the game came during the bottom of the seventh inning, when the Rangers made three consecutive errors. A fielding error by Elvis Andrus, a throwing error by first baseman Mitch Moreland (that was thrown at Andrus), and a missed catch error, also by Andrus, loaded the bases with nobody out. Ben Revere proceeded to hit into a fielder's choice to first, with Moreland throwing to home, where pinch runner Dalton Pompey slid into catcher Chris Gimenez to prevent the chance of a double play; after a Texas review, the play stood, and no interference was called. After Rangers sinkerballer Sam Dyson relieved Cole Hamels, Josh Donaldson hit a ball just over the glove of Rougned Odor. Odor recovered and threw the ball to second base for a force out but the tying run scored and left runners on first and third. The next batter, José Bautista, hit a three-run home run off Dyson to give the Blue Jays a 6–3 lead. He would flip his bat before running the bases, an action widely applauded by Blue Jays fans and several media outlets but considered unsportsmanlike by some observers. The benches would clear afterward, when Edwin Encarnación threw up his hands to the fans in an attempt to discourage any more garbage being thrown on the field but Dyson interpreted that as Encarnación showboating. At the end of the inning, Dyson and Troy Tulowitzki got into an argument after Dyson touched Tulowitzki on the buttocks when Dyson was walking back to his dugout, and the benches cleared once again. There were no ejections or punches thrown in either bench-clearing incident.

Roberto Osuna would record a five-out save, and at the age of 20, became the youngest pitcher in American League history to record a save in the postseason, as well as the second-youngest pitcher in Major League history to do so.

The game marked the third time in the history of the Division Series in which a team lost the first two games at home, but came back to win the series. This also marked the first time that a Toronto-based team in the Big Four won a postseason round since the Maple Leafs' series victory in the first round of the 2004 Stanley Cup playoffs.

This game also started a series of bad blood between Toronto and Texas. The next season, in a regular season game in Arlington, Bautista was hit by pitch, then Odor and Bautista got into a fight out at second base after the latter slid into the former's underside to prevent a double play. Odor punched Bautista in the face and was ejected, while Bautista was also ejected for fighting. Several other players were ejected, and several more were suspended with Odor for eight games (later reduced to seven) and Bautista for one. The two teams faced each other in the ALDS again in 2016, and the Blue Jays won in a 3-game sweep; in Game 1 Bautista hit a three-run home run and then emphatically slammed down the bat in celebration.

=== Composite line score ===
2015 ALDS (3–2): Toronto Blue Jays beat Texas Rangers

Team	1	2	3	4	5	6	7	8	9	10	11	12	13	14	R	H	E
Toronto Blue Jays	4	3	5	2	2	5	5	0	0	0	0	0	0	0	26	42	3
Texas Rangers	3	1	4	0	2	0	4	3	0	0	0	0	0	2	19	40	5
Total attendance: 247,912 Average attendance: 49,582

== See also ==
- 2015 National League Division Series
