= 2016 Major League Baseball postseason =

2016 Major League Baseball playoffs

Tournament details
- Dates: October 4 – November 2, 2016
- Teams: 10

Final positions
- Champions: Chicago Cubs (3rd title)
- Runners-up: Cleveland Indians

Tournament statistics
- Most HRs: Jason Kipnis (CLE) (4)
- Most SBs: Rajai Davis (CLE) & Jason Heyward (CHC) (4)
- Most Ks (as pitcher): Corey Kluber (CLE) (35)

Awards
- MVP: Ben Zobrist (CHC)

The 2016 Major League Baseball postseason was the playoff tournament of Major League Baseball for the 2016 season. The winners of the Division Series would move on to the League Championship Series to determine the pennant winners that face each other in the World Series. This was the last edition of the postseason in which home field advantage in the World Series was determined by the winner of the MLB All-Star Game.

In the American League, the Toronto Blue Jays and Texas Rangers made their second straight postseason appearances respectively, the Cleveland Indians and Boston Red Sox made their second postseason appearances in the past four years, and the Baltimore Orioles made their third appearance in the past five years.

In the National League, the San Francisco Giants made their fourth appearance in seven years, the Washington Nationals made their third appearance in the past five years, the Chicago Cubs and New York Mets returned for the second year in a row, and the Los Angeles Dodgers returned for the fourth straight time.

This was the last edition of the postseason until 2025 to not feature the Houston Astros, who made eight straight appearances from 2017 to 2024.

The postseason began on October 4, and ended on November 2, with the Cubs defeating the Indians in seven games in the 2016 World Series. It was the Cubs' first title in 108 years, ending the longest championship drought in North American sports history, as well as the Curse of the Billy Goat.

== Playoff seeds ==
American League Teams National League Teams

The following teams qualified for the postseason:

=== American League ===
1. Texas Rangers – 95–67, AL West champions
2. Cleveland Indians – 94–67, AL Central champions
3. Boston Red Sox – 93–69, AL East champions
4. Toronto Blue Jays – 89–73 (10–9 head-to-head record vs. BAL)
5. Baltimore Orioles – 89–73 (9–10 head-to-head record vs. TOR)

=== National League ===
1. Chicago Cubs – 103–58, NL Central champions
2. Washington Nationals – 95–67, NL East champions
3. Los Angeles Dodgers – 91–71, NL West champions
4. New York Mets – 87–75 (4–3 head-to-head record vs. SF)
5. San Francisco Giants – 87–75 (3–4 head-to-head record vs. NYM)

== Playoff bracket ==
Wild Card Game (ALWC, NLWC)
4	Toronto	1
5	Baltimore	0
4	NY Mets	0
5	San Francisco	1

Division Series (ALDS, NLDS)
1	Texas	0
4	Toronto	3
American League
2	Cleveland	3
3	Boston	0
1	Chicago Cubs	3
5	San Francisco	1
National League
2	Washington	2
3	LA Dodgers	3

League Championship Series (ALCS, NLCS)
4	Toronto	1
2	Cleveland	4
1	Chicago Cubs	4
3	LA Dodgers	2

World Series
AL2	Cleveland	3
NL1	Chicago Cubs	4

== American League Wild Card ==
=== (4) Toronto Blue Jays vs. (5) Baltimore Orioles ===
October 4, 2016 8:08 pm (EDT) at Rogers Centre in Toronto, Ontario 63 °F (17 °C), clear
Team	1	2	3	4	5	6	7	8	9	10	11	R	H	E
Baltimore	0	0	0	2	0	0	0	0	0	0	0	2	4	0
Toronto	0	1	0	0	1	0	0	0	0	0	3	5	9	0
WP: Francisco Liriano (1–0) LP: Ubaldo Jiménez (0–1); Home runs: BAL: Mark Trumbo (1); TOR: José Bautista (1), Edwin Encarnación (1); Attendance: 49,934; Boxscore

The Blue Jays defeated the Orioles 5–2 to return to the ALDS for the second year in a row. Edwin Encarnación hit a walk-off three-run home run off Ubaldo Jiménez in the bottom of the eleventh to give Toronto the win.

== National League Wild Card ==
=== (4) New York Mets vs. (5) San Francisco Giants ===
October 5, 2016 8:08 pm (EDT) at Citi Field in Queens, New York, 62 °F (17 °C), clear
Team	1	2	3	4	5	6	7	8	9	R	H	E
San Francisco	0	0	0	0	0	0	0	0	3	3	5	0
New York	0	0	0	0	0	0	0	0	0	0	4	0
WP: Madison Bumgarner (1–0) LP: Jeurys Familia (0–1); Home runs: SF: Conor Gillaspie (1); NYM: None; Attendance: 44,747; Boxscore

This was the second postseason meeting between the Mets and Giants. They last met in the NLDS in 2000, which was won by the Mets in four games before falling in the World Series. The Giants shut out the defending National League champion Mets to advance to the NLDS for the fourth time in seven years.

The Giants won thanks to a 3-run home run by Conor Gillaspie in the top of the ninth. Madison Bumgarner pitched a four-hit complete-game shutout in the Wild Card Game for the second time in three years.

As of 2026, this is the last postseason series win by the Giants.

== American League Division Series ==
=== (1) Texas Rangers vs. (4) Toronto Blue Jays ===
Toronto won the series, 3–0.

Game	Date	Score	Location	Time	Attendance
1	October 6	Toronto Blue Jays – 10, Texas Rangers – 1	Globe Life Park	2:58	47,434
2	October 7	Toronto Blue Jays – 5, Texas Rangers – 3	Globe Life Park	3:30	48,019
3	October 9	Texas Rangers – 6, Toronto Blue Jays – 7 (10)	Rogers Centre	3:21	49,555

This was the second straight postseason meeting between the Blue Jays and Rangers. The Blue Jays once again emerged victorious, sweeping the Rangers to advance to the ALCS for the second year in a row.

Marco Estrada pitched eight innings of shutout ball as the Blue Jays blew out the Rangers in Game 1. In Game 2, four different players homered for the Blue Jays as the won 5–3 to go up 2–0 in the series headed to Toronto. Game 2 was the last postseason game ever played at Globe Life Park. The Blue Jays took Game 3 in extra innings, capped off by an error made by Texas' Rougned Odor while attempting a double play — the throw went wide of first baseman Mitch Moreland, which allowed Toronto's Josh Donaldson to run to home plate and clinch the series win for the Blue Jays.

=== (2) Cleveland Indians vs. (3) Boston Red Sox ===
Cleveland won the series, 3–0.

Game	Date	Score	Location	Time	Attendance
1	October 6	Boston Red Sox – 4, Cleveland Indians – 5	Progressive Field	3:33	37,763
2	October 7	Boston Red Sox – 0, Cleveland Indians – 6	Progressive Field	3:19	37,842
3	October 10	Cleveland Indians – 4, Boston Red Sox – 3	Fenway Park	3:41	39,530

This was the fifth postseason meeting between the Red Sox and Indians (1995, 1998, 1999, 2007). The Indians swept the Red Sox to return to the ALCS for the first time since 2007.

The Indians prevailed in a Game 1 slugfest, as each team had three home runs each. Corey Kluber pitched seven innings of shutout ball as the Indians won 6–0 to take a 2–0 series lead headed to Boston. In Game 3, the Indians’ bullpen ended a potential rally by the Red Sox as they won by one run to complete the sweep. Game 3 would ultimately be David Ortiz’s final major league game.

With the win, the Indians improved their postseason record against the Red Sox to 3–2. The Indians’ 2016 ALDS victory started a streak of playoff success for Cleveland-based teams against their Boston counterparts, as the NBA’s Cleveland Cavaliers then defeated the Boston Celtics in the Eastern Conference Finals of the NBA Playoffs in 2017 and 2018.

== National League Division Series ==
=== (1) Chicago Cubs vs. (5) San Francisco Giants ===
Chicago won the series, 3–1.

Game	Date	Score	Location	Time	Attendance
1	October 7	San Francisco Giants – 0, Chicago Cubs – 1	Wrigley Field	2:30	42,148
2	October 8	San Francisco Giants – 2, Chicago Cubs – 5	Wrigley Field	3:03	42,392
3	October 10	Chicago Cubs – 5, San Francisco Giants – 6 (13)	AT&T Park	5:03	43,571
4	October 11	Chicago Cubs – 6, San Francisco Giants – 5	AT&T Park	3:25	43,166

This was the second postseason meeting between the Cubs and Giants. Their last meeting was in the NLCS in 1989, which the Giants won in five games before falling in the World Series. The Cubs defeated the Giants in four games to advance to the NLCS for the second year in a row.

Jon Lester pitched eight innings of shutout ball as the Cubs won 1-0 in Game 1. In Game 2, the Cubs jumped into the lead early and held it to take a 2–0 series lead headed to San Francisco. Game 2 was notable for Chicago’s Travis Wood becoming the first relief pitcher since the 1924 World Series to hit a home run in the postseason. In Game 3, the Cubs led 3-2 after seven, but the Giants rallied with a three run eighth to take the lead. The Cubs forced extra innings in the top of the ninth thanks to a two-run home run from Kris Bryant, but the Giants ultimately prevailed in the bottom of the thirteenth thanks to a walk-off RBI double from Joe Panik. Game 3 was Madison Bumgarner’s final postseason game. Game 4 started out with the Giants leading 5-2 going into the ninth, and were three outs away from sending the series back to Chicago. However, the Giants’ defense imploded - they used five pitchers in the inning and gave up four unanswered runs as the Cubs took the lead for good. Aroldis Chapman pitched a 1-2-3 ninth to close out the series. In Game 4, the Cubs became the first team since the 1986 New York Mets to overcome a 3-run deficit when trailing after eight innings and win the game, and the Cubs were the first team to complete the feat in regulation.

The Giants were denied the chance to win a fourth World Series title in seven years, officially ending their dynasty.

=== (2) Washington Nationals vs. (3) Los Angeles Dodgers ===
Los Angeles won the series, 3–2.

Game	Date	Score	Location	Time	Attendance
1	October 7	Los Angeles Dodgers – 4, Washington Nationals – 3	Nationals Park	3:46	43,915
2	October 9	Los Angeles Dodgers – 2, Washington Nationals – 5	Nationals Park	3:55	43,826
3	October 10	Washington Nationals – 8, Los Angeles Dodgers – 3	Dodger Stadium	4:12	53,901
4	October 11	Washington Nationals – 5, Los Angeles Dodgers – 6	Dodger Stadium	3:44	49,617
5	October 13	Los Angeles Dodgers – 4, Washington Nationals – 3	Nationals Park	4:32	43,936

This was the second postseason meeting between the Dodgers and Nationals. They last met in the NLCS in 1981 - back when the Nationals were known as the Montreal Expos, and was won by the Dodgers en route to a World Series title. The Dodgers defeated the Nationals in five games to return to the NLCS for the fourth time in eight years.

Clayton Kershaw outdueled Max Scherzer in Game 1 as the Dodgers won 4-3. In Game 2, José Lobatón hit a three-run home run to put the Nationals up for good as they won to even the series headed to Los Angeles. Anthony Rendon and Jayson Werth both homered for the Nationals in Game 3 as they blew out the Dodgers to take the series lead. However, it would not hold. The Dodgers won a tightly-contested Game 4 to send the series back to the nation’s capital. Kershaw got the save in a comeback win for the Dodgers in Game 5.

Both teams would meet again in the NLDS in 2019, which the Nationals won in five games en route to a World Series title.

== American League Championship Series ==
=== (2) Cleveland Indians vs. (4) Toronto Blue Jays ===
Cleveland won the series, 4–1.

Game	Date	Score	Location	Time	Attendance
1	October 14	Toronto Blue Jays – 0, Cleveland Indians – 2	Progressive Field	2:44	37,727
2	October 15	Toronto Blue Jays – 1, Cleveland Indians – 2	Progressive Field	2:44	37,870
3	October 17	Cleveland Indians – 4, Toronto Blue Jays – 2	Rogers Centre	3:23	49,507
4	October 18	Cleveland Indians – 1, Toronto Blue Jays – 5	Rogers Centre	3:01	49,142
5	October 19	Cleveland Indians – 3, Toronto Blue Jays – 0	Rogers Centre	2:37	48,800

This was the last ALCS until 2025 to not feature either the Houston Astros or New York Yankees. The Indians defeated the Blue Jays in five games to return to the World Series for the first time since 1997.

Despite Toronto’s Marco Estrada pitching a complete game, Corey Kluber and the Indians’ bullpen held the Blue Jays’ offense at bay as they won 2–0 in Game 1. Andrew Miller and Cody Allen would silence the Blue Jays’ offense late in Game 2 as the Indians won 2–1 to take a 2–0 series lead headed to Toronto. In Game 3, Toronto’s offense began to come alive as Michael Saunders tied the game at two in the bottom of the fifth, but it wasn’t enough as Jason Kipnis hit a solo home run to put the Indians ahead for good, giving them a commanding three games to none series lead. In Game 4, the Blue Jays took their first lead of the series as Josh Donaldson homered in the bottom of the third, and Edwin Encarnación singled to score two runs, ultimately securing the Blue Jays’ victory. However, the Indians pitching staff pitched yet another shutout in Game 5 as they won 3–0 to secure the pennant.

The Indians set an MLB record with the lowest batting average by a winning team in a postseason series, hitting just .168 against the Blue Jays. They also became the first club to win the AL pennant on the road since the Chicago White Sox did so at Angel Stadium in 2005. As of 2026, this is the last time the Indians/Guardians won the AL pennant. They would return to the ALCS in 2024, but they lost to the New York Yankees in five games.

The Blue Jays would return to the ALCS in 2025, and defeated the Seattle Mariners in seven games after being eight outs away from elimination in Game 7, but they would fall in the World Series.

The 2016 ALCS was part of a streak of playoff success for Cleveland-based teams against their Toronto counterparts, as the NBA’s Cleveland Cavaliers also defeated the Toronto Raptors in the NBA playoffs in the 2016 Eastern Conference Finals, the Eastern Conference Semifinals in both 2017 and 2018, and first round in 2026.

== National League Championship Series ==
=== (1) Chicago Cubs vs. (3) Los Angeles Dodgers ===
Chicago won the series, 4–2.

Game	Date	Score	Location	Time	Attendance
1	October 15	Los Angeles Dodgers – 4, Chicago Cubs – 8	Wrigley Field	3:37	42,376
2	October 16	Los Angeles Dodgers – 1, Chicago Cubs – 0	Wrigley Field	2:45	42,384
3	October 18	Chicago Cubs – 0, Los Angeles Dodgers – 6	Dodger Stadium	3:18	54,269
4	October 19	Chicago Cubs – 10, Los Angeles Dodgers – 2	Dodger Stadium	3:58	54,449
5	October 20	Chicago Cubs – 8, Los Angeles Dodgers – 4	Dodger Stadium	4:16	54,449
6	October 22	Los Angeles Dodgers – 0, Chicago Cubs – 5	Wrigley Field	2:36	42,386

This was the second postseason meeting between the Cubs and Dodgers. They had last met in the NLDS in 2008, which the Dodgers won in a sweep. The Cubs defeated the Dodgers in six games, advancing to the World Series for the first time since 1945, ending what was the longest pennant drought in the MLB, as well as the longest conference championship drought in North American sports (in the process denying a rematch of the 1920 World Series between the Dodgers and Indians).

The Cubs broke a late 3–3 tie in the bottom of the eighth thanks to a grand slam from Miguel Montero to take Game 1. Game 2 was a pitchers duel between Los Angeles’ Clayton Kershaw and Chicago’s Kyle Hendricks, which was won by the former as the Dodgers evened the series headed to Los Angeles with a 1–0 victory. In Game 3, Rich Hill pitched six innings of shutout ball as the Dodgers shut out the Cubs by a 6–0 score to go up 2–1 in the series, becoming the fourth team in LCS history to win in consecutive shutouts. The Cubs offense came alive in Game 4 as they blew out the Dodgers to even the series. In Game 5, the Cubs took the lead off of a two-run home run from Addison Russell, and added in some insurance runs from Javier Báez’s bases-clearing double to take a 3–2 series lead headed back to Chicago. In Game 6, Anthony Rizzo and Willson Contreras each hit home runs and Kris Bryant, Ben Zobrist, and Dexter Fowler each drove in a run as the Cubs jumped to a 5–0 lead and didn’t relinquish it, ending their long pennant drought and finally returning to the World Series.

As of 2026, this is the last time the Cubs won the NL pennant, and is the most recent conference championship won by a Chicago-based team. With their win over the Dodgers, the Seattle Mariners, who have yet to win a pennant since their inception in 1977, now hold the longest active pennant drought. The team with the longest active pennant drought in the National League now became the Pittsburgh Pirates, who last won it in 1979. This was the first time the Cubs clinched the NL pennant at home since 1932.

Both teams would meet again in the NLCS the next year, which the Dodgers won in five games before falling in the World Series.

== 2016 World Series ==
=== (AL2) Cleveland Indians vs. (NL1) Chicago Cubs ===
Chicago (NL) won the series, 4–3.

Game	Date	Score	Location	Time	Attendance
1	October 25	Chicago Cubs – 0, Cleveland Indians – 6	Progressive Field	3:37	38,091
2	October 26	Chicago Cubs – 5, Cleveland Indians – 1	Progressive Field	4:04	38,172
3	October 28	Cleveland Indians – 1, Chicago Cubs – 0	Wrigley Field	3:33	41,703
4	October 29	Cleveland Indians – 7, Chicago Cubs – 2	Wrigley Field	3:16	41,706
5	October 30	Cleveland Indians – 2, Chicago Cubs – 3	Wrigley Field	3:27	41,711
6	November 1	Chicago Cubs – 9, Cleveland Indians – 3	Progressive Field	3:29	38,116
7	November 2	Chicago Cubs – 8, Cleveland Indians – 7 (10)	Progressive Field	4:28 (:17 delay)	38,104

This World Series featured the two teams with the longest championship droughts in the league - the Cubs' last championship came in 1908, while the Indians' last title was in 1948. In what is considered by many to be one of the greatest World Series ever played, the Cubs overcame a 3–1 series deficit to defeat the Indians in seven games, winning their first title in 108 years, ending the Curse of the Billy Goat, as well as the longest championship drought in North American sports.

In Game 1, Corey Kluber pitched six shutout innings as the Indians won 6-0. In Game 2, Jake Arrieta and the Cubs bullpen held the Indians to just one run as the Cubs prevailed to win their first World Series game since 1945 and even the series headed back to Chicago. In the first World Series game played at Wrigley Field since 1945, the Indians, with help from four pitchers - Josh Tomlin, Andrew Miller, Bryan Shaw, and Cody Allen, shut out the Cubs by a 1–0 score to take a 2–1 series lead. In Game 4, Kluber went another six innings as the Indians prevailed in a blowout win to take a 3–1 series lead. In Game 5, Jon Lester pitched six strong innings and Aroldis Chapman stopped a rally by the Indians as the Cubs won their first home World Series game since 1945, sending the series back to Cleveland. In Game 6, the Cubs blew out the Indians to force a seventh game, and also made National League history as Arrieta became the first NL starting pitcher to win two road games in a single World Series since Bob Gibson in 1967.

Game 7 was the most notable contest of the series - the Indians, thanks to a 2-run home run from Rajai Davis, tied the game at six runs a piece. The game went into extra innings, and was then hit with a rain delay for 17 minutes. When play resumed in the top of the tenth, an RBI double from Ben Zobrist and an RBI single from Miguel Montero put the Cubs back in the lead for good. The Indians scored one more run in the bottom of the tenth to cut the Cubs' lead to one thanks to an RBI single from Davis, but Kris Bryant picked up an infield ground ball and threw it to Anthony Rizzo, securing the title for the Cubs. This was the first Game 7 won by the Cubs in franchise history, having previously lost in their last two seventh game appearances, in the 1945 World Series and the NLCS in 2003.

The Cubs' victory was the first World Series title for Chicago since 2005, when the Chicago White Sox swept the Houston Astros to end the Curse of the Black Sox. This marked the first time that the Cubs had won the World Series while playing at Wrigley Field. The Cubs became the sixth team in World Series history to overcome a 3–1 series deficit to win the title, and the first team to do so since the Kansas City Royals in 1985. As of 2026, this is the most recent major professional sports championship won by a Chicago-based team, and the last time a Chicago-based team appeared in the championship round of either one of the four major North American sports leagues. The Cubs were the last NL Central team to win the World Series until the Milwaukee Brewers in 2026.

After the loss, the Indians now became the team with the longest World Series title drought as well as the second longest championship drought in North American sports, which stood at 68 years, and is now 78 years. The only team of the four major North American leagues to have a longer championship drought are the NFL's Arizona Cardinals, who won their last championship in 1947, as the Chicago Cardinals, a year before Cleveland's last World Series title.

As of 2026, this is the last time that a team from either Ohio or Illinois appeared in the World Series, and was the last to not feature a team from Texas or California until 2026.

== Broadcasting ==
This was third year of eight-year U.S. TV contracts with ESPN, Fox Sports, and TBS. ESPN aired the National League Wild Card Game, Fox Sports 1 and MLB Network split the National League Division Series, and the Fox broadcast network and Fox Sports 1 split the National League Championship Series. TBS had the American League Wild Card Game, Division Series, and Championship Series, with sister network TNT used as an overflow channel. The World Series then aired on the Fox broadcast network for the seventeenth consecutive year.
