= Rougned Odor =

Venezuelan baseball player (born 1994)

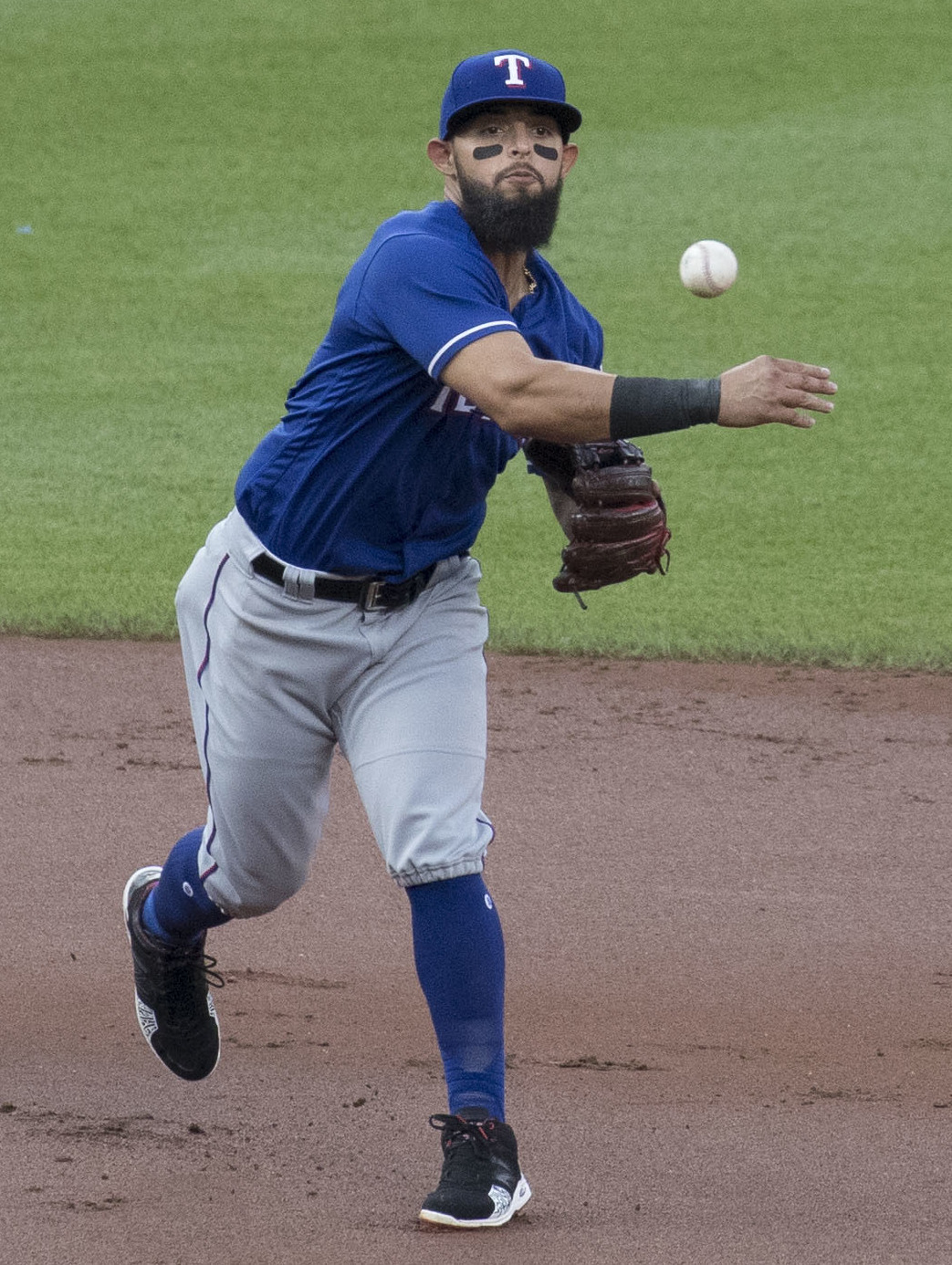
- Odor with the Texas Rangers in 2017

Delfines de La Guaira – No. 12
- Second baseman
- Born: February 3, 1994 (age 32); Maracaibo, Venezuela
- Bats: Left Throws: Right

MLB debut
- May 8, 2014, for the Texas Rangers

MLB statistics (through 2023 season)
- Batting average: .230
- Home runs: 178
- Runs batted in: 568
- Stats at Baseball Reference

Teams
- Texas Rangers (2014–2020); New York Yankees (2021); Baltimore Orioles (2022); San Diego Padres (2023)

Rougned Roberto Odor (Spanish pronunciation: [ˈruɣneð oˈðoɾ]) (born February 3, 1994), nicknamed "Rougie", is a Venezuelan professional baseball second baseman for the Delfines de La Guaira of the Venezuelan Major League. He has previously played in Major League Baseball (MLB) for the Texas Rangers, New York Yankees, Baltimore Orioles, and San Diego Padres.

Odor played for Texas's minor league affiliates from 2011 until he was called up to the MLB team in 2014. The Rangers traded him to the Yankees in 2021 where he would be released following the season. He was later signed by the Orioles for the 2022 season.

== Early life and family ==
Odor was born in Maracaibo, Venezuela, on February 3, 1994. His first name is a combination of his grandfather's name, Douglas, and his grandmother's name, Nedia; in keeping with the family custom of giving boys names that begin with the letter "R", the "D" in Douglas was changed to an "R," yielding Rougned.

His father, also named Rougned, played college baseball for the University of New Orleans. He has a sister and a younger brother, Rougned José Odor, who signed with the Texas Rangers organization on February 19, 2015. His uncle, Rouglas, played for eight seasons in Minor League Baseball for the Cleveland and Milwaukee Brewers organizations, and was the manager of the Akron RubberDucks from 2019 to 2023. Three of his uncles on his mother's side played baseball. All three played for the Aguilas de Zulia in the Venezuelan Professional Baseball League, while Eduardo Zambrano also played in MLB for the Chicago Cubs.

Though raised in Maracaibo, he also visited his mother's family in the country during weekends. He spent time around horses, and he enjoys toros coleados, a sport involving horses.

Odor began playing baseball at the age of two. He played in the 2009 World Youth Baseball Championship. He was named to the tournament's all-star team as a second baseman.

== Professional career ==
=== Minor leagues ===
Odor signed with the Texas Rangers as an international free agent in 2011, receiving a $425,000 signing bonus. The Rangers aggressively assigned him to the Spokane Indians of the Low–A Northwest League. He was the youngest player in the Northwest League, and had a .262 batting average on the season. Odor was suspended for four games after starting a brawl during a game with the Vancouver Canadians. In 2012, Odor batted .259 with the Hickory Crawdads of the Single–A South Atlantic League.

Odor began the 2013 season with the Myrtle Beach Pelicans of the High–A Carolina League, where he had a .303 batting average in 99 games played. In August 2013, Odor was promoted to the Frisco RoughRiders of the Double–A Texas League. Odor's emergence with the Rangers allowed them to trade utility infielder Leury Garcia to the Chicago White Sox for all-star right fielder Alex Rios that month. He finished the season with a .305 batting average with 41 doubles, six triples, 11 home runs, and 78 runs batted in in 130 games for Myrtle Beach and Frisco. The Rangers named Odor their minor league player of the year.

The Rangers invited Odor to spring training in 2014. He began the year with Frisco.

=== Texas Rangers ===
==== 2014 ====
The Rangers promoted Odor to the major leagues on May 8, 2014. On May 9, against Boston Red Sox pitcher Clay Buchholz, Odor hit a single for his first major league hit. On May 12, against Houston Astros pitcher Brad Peacock, Odor hit his first major league home run. He hit his first grand slam on August 27, in a 12–4 decision against the Seattle Mariners. Odor was the youngest player in the MLB during his rookie season and helped the Rangers' second base problem even though they finished 67–95, the third-worst record in baseball that year.

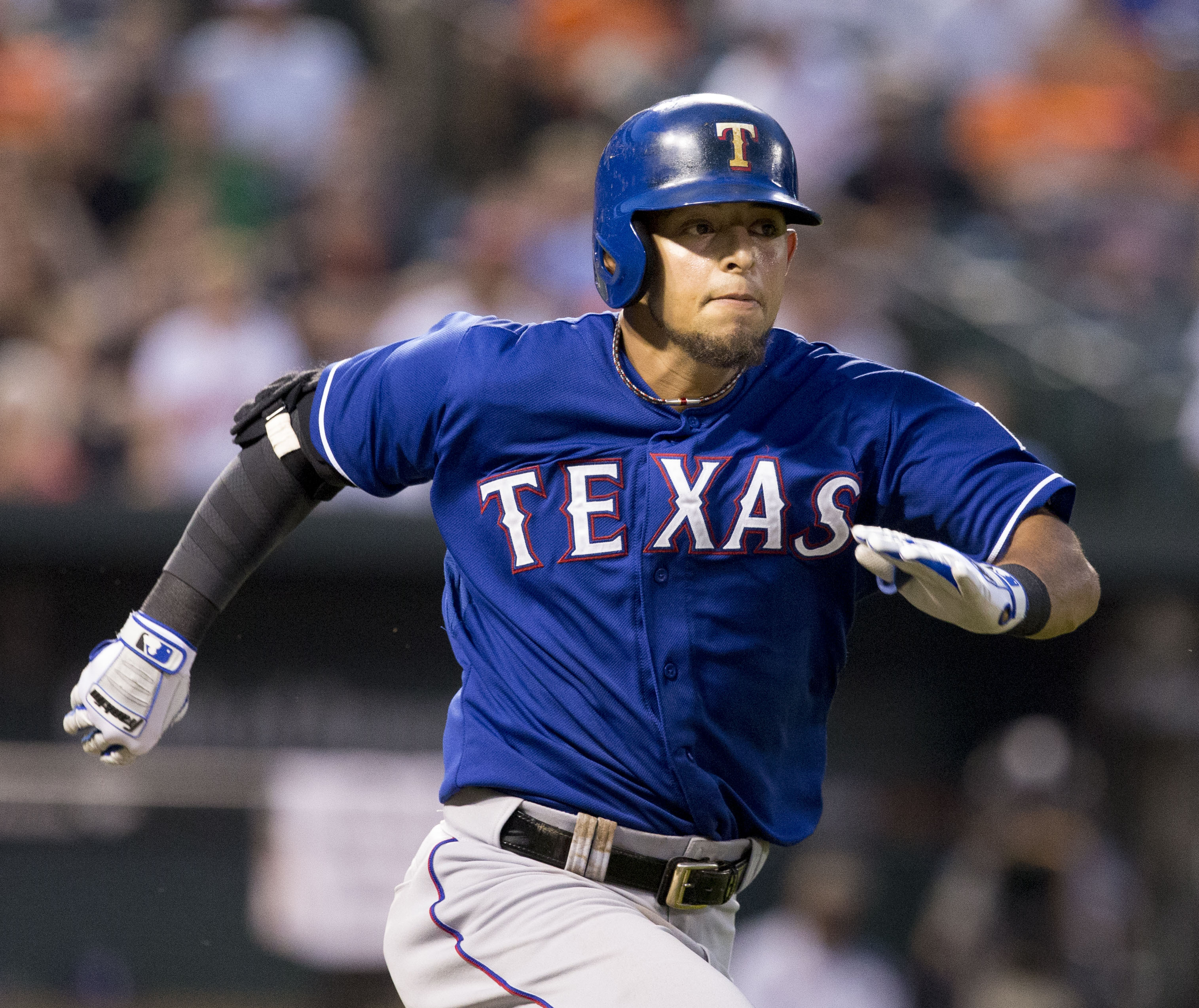
Odor with the Texas Rangers in 2014

Odor finished the year hitting a .259 batting average, 39 runs, 14 doubles, nine home runs, four stolen bases, and 48 RBIs in 386 at-bats over 110 games. He was the youngest player in the American League, was 8th in the league in triples (7), and was 10th in caught stealing (7).

==== 2015 ====
Odor began 2015 as the Rangers' starting second baseman, but he struggled mightily, hitting .144 with one home run, nine RBIs, and 25 strikeouts to go with seven walks in 29 games. He was optioned to the Round Rock Express of the Triple–A Pacific Coast League on May 11. However, upon his demotion, Odor found his stroke, beating up Triple-A pitching to a .352/.426/.639 slash with five home runs, 19 RBIs, and only 10 strikeouts to 12 walks in roughly the same number of appearances. On June 15, following an injury to Delino DeShields Jr., Odor was recalled to the Rangers, and in his return, promptly went 3-for-3 with two RBI against the Dodgers. Rougned proceeded to hit very hot in the month of June, hitting .391 with two home runs and nine RBIs and hit .319 with five home runs and 16 RBI in July.

He ended the regular season hitting .261, with 16 home runs, 61 RBIs, and 54 runs scored. He led all AL second basemen in errors, with 17.

==== 2016 ====
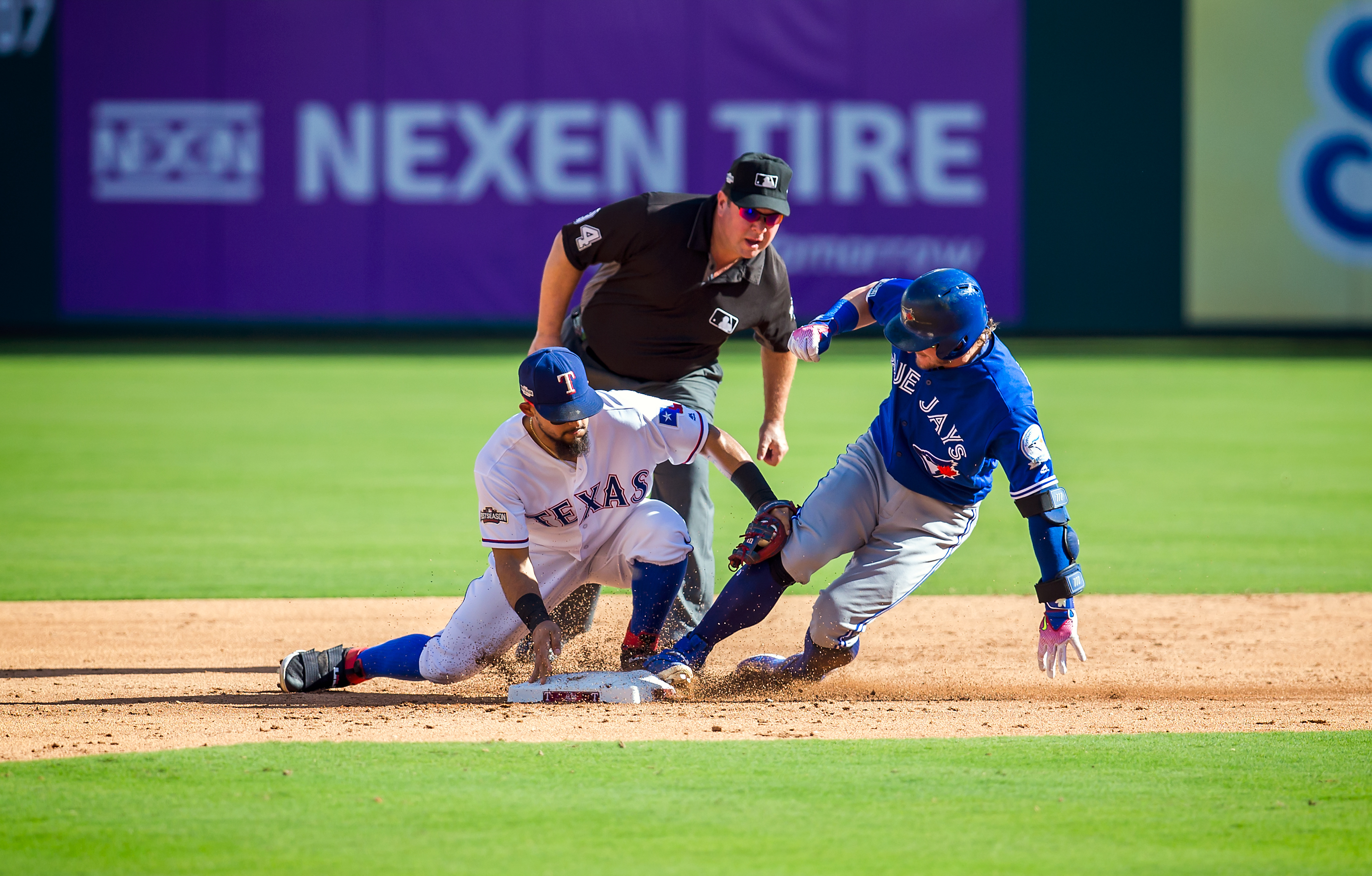
Odor attempts to tag out Josh Donaldson during Game 1 of the 2016 ALDS

On May 15, 2016, Odor was involved in an on-field brawl, punching Jose Bautista in the face during the eighth inning of a game against the Toronto Blue Jays after Bautista slid into Odor at second base during a double play. Odor first pushed and then swung at Bautista, hitting him squarely in the face. There was speculation that this incident spilled over from the bad blood that resulted from Game 5 of 2015's American League Division Series between the Rangers and the Blue Jays, a game that included Blue Jays fans throwing trash onto the field and Bautista flipping his bat emphatically after hitting the Blue Jays' go-ahead home run. Odor received an eight-game suspension from MLB two days later for his actions that resulted in the brawl. After an appeal, Odor's suspension was revised, eventually finalized at seven games.

In 150 games, Odor finished the year with a .271 batting average, 33 home runs, 33 doubles, and 88 RBI. He walked in 3.0% of his at-bats, the lowest percentage in the major leagues, and had the lowest walks-per-strikeout ratio in the majors (0.14). He saw the highest percentage of curveballs of all MLB hitters (16.0%). He led all AL second basemen in errors, with 22.

On October 9, Odor was charged with a throwing error which allowed the Toronto Blue Jays to score the winning run in the 10th inning of Game 3 of the ALDS, thus eliminating the Rangers despite holding the best record in the AL in 2016.

==== 2017 ====
Before the 2017 season, Odor played for the Venezuelan national baseball team in the 2017 World Baseball Classic. On March 25, Odor signed a six-year extension worth $49.5 million. The deal was finalized on March 30. In the Rangers' season opener against the Cleveland Indians, Odor hit two home runs in his first two at-bats of the season.

For the 2017 season, he batted .204/.252/.397, had the lowest on base percentage of all qualified major league batters, and had the lowest batting average on balls in play (.224) of all major league players. For the third consecutive season he led all AL second basemen in errors, with 19.

==== 2018 ====
In 2018, Odor batted .253/.326/.424 with 18 home runs and 63 RBI. He stole 12 bases, but led the American League in caught stealing, with 12.

==== 2019 ====
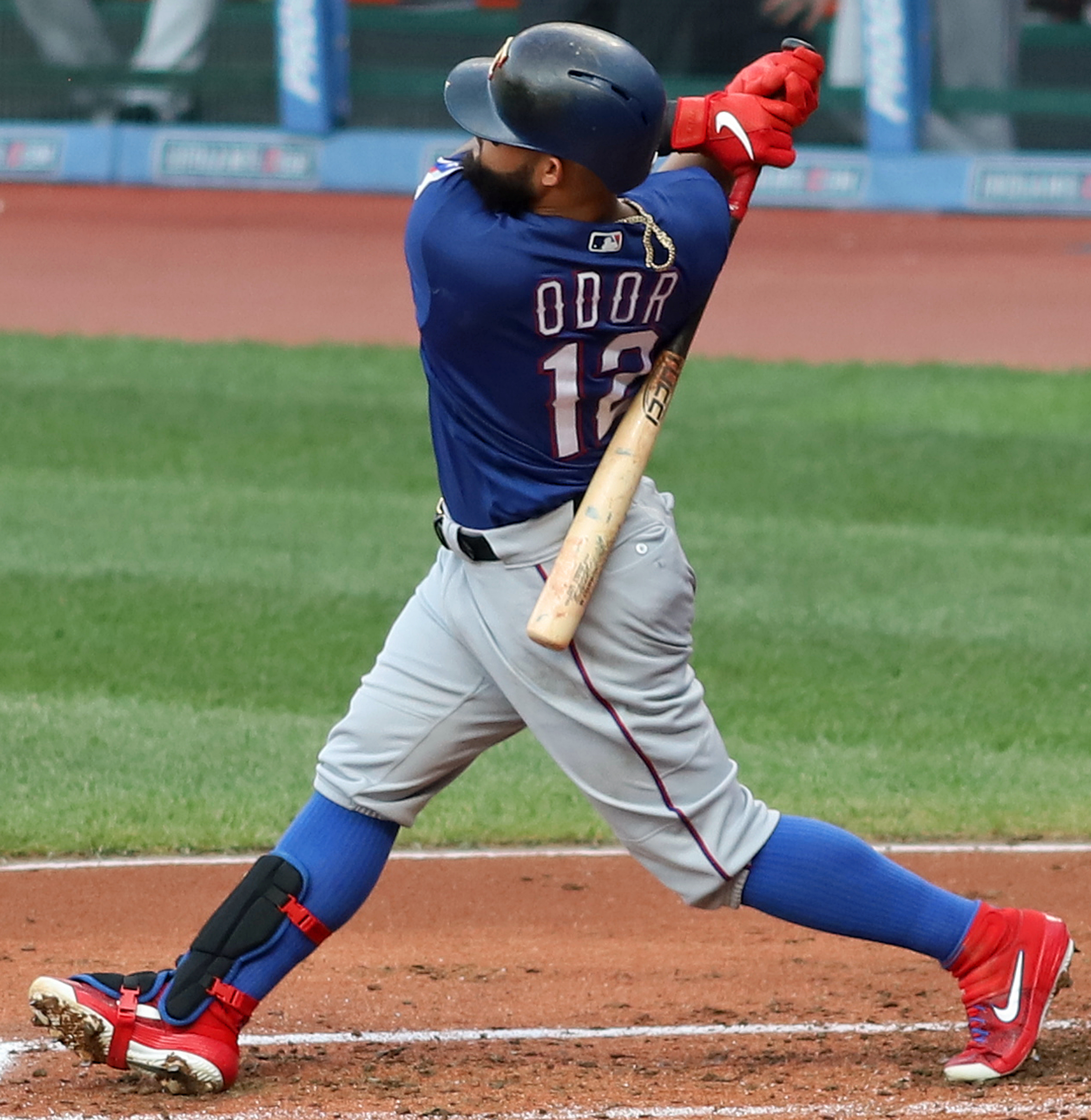
Odor with the Rangers in 2019

In 2019, he batted .205/.283/.439/.721 with 30 home runs and 93 RBIs. He led the American League with 178 strikeouts. In 2019, on defense he led all American League second basemen in errors, with 15.

==== 2020 ====
In 2020, Odor batted .167/209/.413 with 10 home runs and 30 RBI. Odor only played in 38 games on the year because of the shortened season due to the COVID-19 pandemic.

On March 29, 2021, Odor was informed that he had not made the Rangers' Opening Day roster. He was designated for assignment when the Rangers' set their Opening Day roster on April 1.

=== New York Yankees ===
On April 6, 2021, the Rangers traded Odor to the New York Yankees for Josh Stowers and Antonio Cabello. In July and August, he moved to third base for 23 games to fill in for Gio Urshela.

The Yankees designated Odor for assignment on November 19. Odor was released by the Yankees on November 23.

=== Baltimore Orioles ===
Odor signed a one-year contract with the Baltimore Orioles on November 30, 2021. He struggled with the team in 2022, ending with a negative WAR. He ended the 2022 season with the Orioles with a .207/.275/.357 slash line, 13 home runs, 53 RBI, and six stolen bases.

=== San Diego Padres ===
On March 1, 2023, Odor signed a minor league contract with the San Diego Padres, receiving a non-roster invitation to spring training. He had his contract selected on March 30. In 59 games for the Padres, he batted .210/.306/.370 with 4 home runs and 18 RBI. Odor was designated for assignment by San Diego on July 18, following the promotion of Taylor Kohlwey. On July 24, Odor cleared waivers and elected free agency.

=== Yomiuri Giants ===
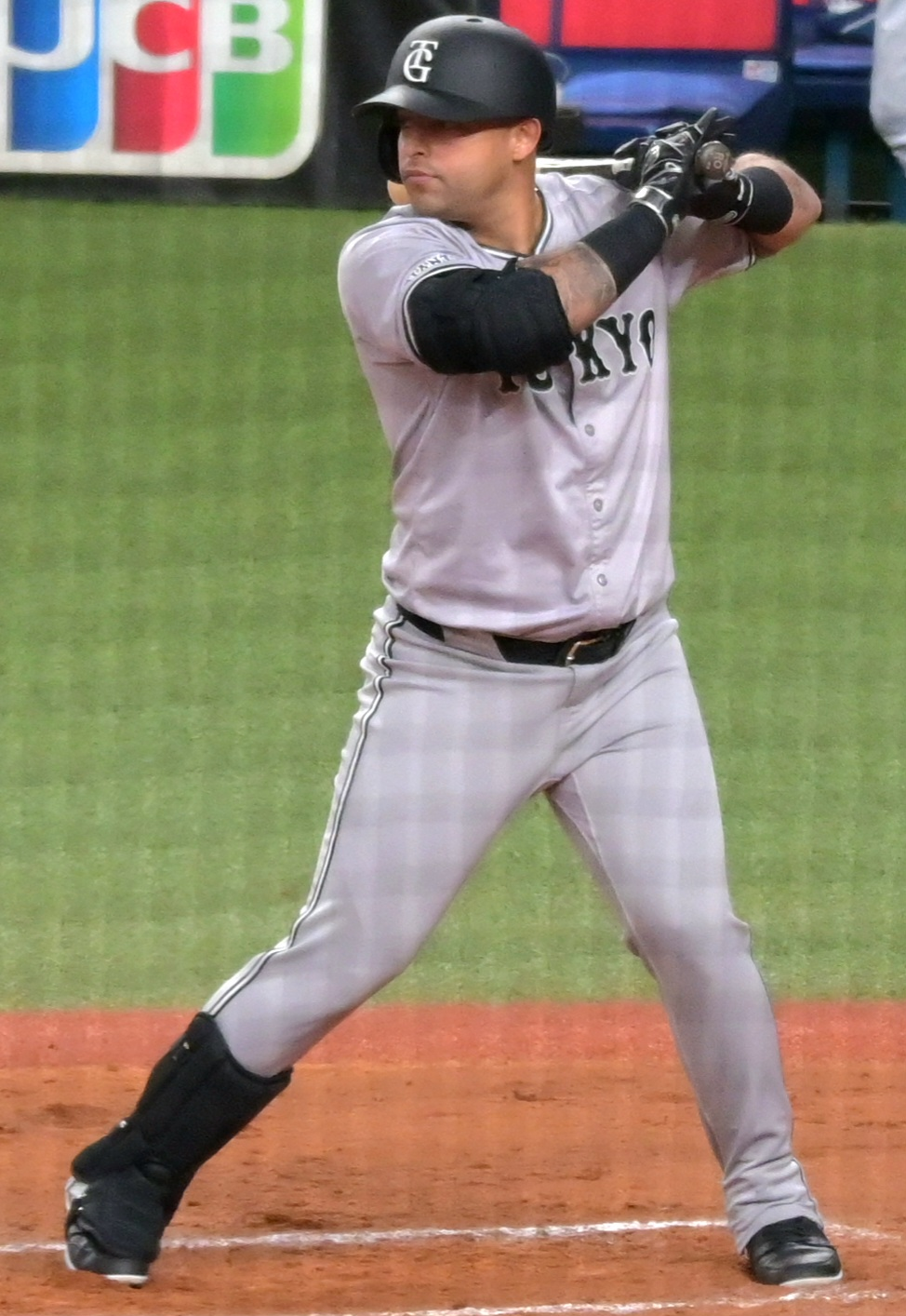
Odor with the Yomiuri Giants in 2024

On January 20, 2024, Odor signed a one-year contract with the Yomiuri Giants of Nippon Professional Baseball. However, Odor was released on March 26, as he left the team just 3 days before Opening Day, despite the team wanting him to start in their minor league system after he finished the preseason with a .176 batting average across 12 games.

=== New York Yankees (second stint) ===
On April 5, 2024, Odor signed a minor league contract with the New York Yankees. He did not play in a game for the Yankees organization before he was released on August 1.

=== Delfines de La Guaira ===
In 2025, Odor signed with the Navegantes del Magallanes of the Venezuelan Major League as a transfer from Águilas del Zulia.

== Personal life ==
As part of the contract Odor signed in 2017, Rangers owner Ray Davis included a pair of quarter horses. These are the seventh and eighth horses Odor owns. Odor plans to build a ranch in the North Texas area, so that his family can move from Venezuela.

== See also ==
- List of Major League Baseball players from Venezuela
