= List of Major League Baseball umpires (N–Z) =

The following is a list of baseball umpires with surnames beginning with the letters N through Z who officiated in Major League Baseball (MLB). The list includes those who worked in any of four 19th-century major leagues (American Association, National Association, Players' League, Union Association), one defunct 20th century major league (Federal League), the currently active Major League Baseball, or either of its leagues (American League, National League) when they maintained separate umpiring staffs. All of the above leagues, with the exception of the National Association, are recognized by MLB's Special Baseball Records Committee. The NA's status as a major league is disputed, with some researchers such as those involved with Retrosheet including it in their major league statistics.

== Key ==
Name
^	Currently active
*	Hall of Fame inductee, for umpiring
§	Hall of Fame inductee, for playing career
†	Former major league player
‡	Substitute umpire (as an active player/manager/coach)

League
AA	American Association (1882–1891)
AL	American League (1901–1999)
ANL	American Negro League (1929)
ECL	Eastern Colored League (1923–1928)
EWL	East–West League (1932)
FL	Federal League (1914–1915)
MLB	Major League Baseball (2000–present)
NA	National Association (1871–1875)
NAL	Negro American League (1937–1948)
NL	National League (1876–1999)
NNL I	Negro National League (1920–1931)
NNL II	Negro National League (1933–1948)
NSL	Negro Southern League (1932)
PL	Players' League (1890)
UA	Union Association (1884)

Years
Years, or range of years, that the umpire was active.

Games
Number of regular season games umpired (through end of 2024). If the umpire has worked in multiple major leagues, the total is inclusive of all leagues.

== Umpires (N–Z) ==
=== N ===
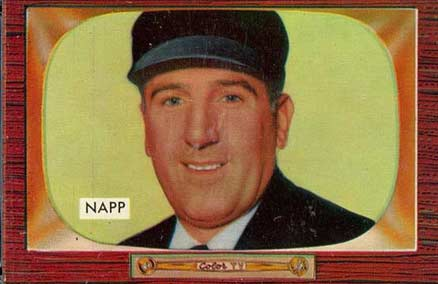
Larry Napp worked 3610 games in the AL

N
Name	League(s)	Years	Games	Ref(s)
Henry Nace	NA	1872	1	
Dick Nallin	AL	1915–1932	2722	
Larry Napp	AL	1951–1974	3610	
Billy Nash†	NL	1901	101	
Paul Nauert	NL, MLB	1995–1999, 2002–2022	2450 (Note: 294 (NL, 1995–99, 2156 (MLB, 2002–22))	
Jose Navas	MLB	2020–2023	153	
Tom Needham‡	NL	1904, 1907	2	
Pete Negri	NL	1979	1	
Bob Nelson	NL	1979, 1991, 1995	32	
Candy Nelson‡	NA	1872	1	
Dick Nelson	AL	1979	36	
Jeff Nelson	NL, MLB	1997–2023	3142 (Note: 254 (NL, 1997–99), 2888 (MLB, 2000–23))	
Scott Nelson	MLB	2001–2003	69	
Jerry Neudecker	AL	1966–1985	3026	
Bobo Newsom‡	AL	1938	1	
Doc Newton‡	NL	1902	1	
A. N. Nichols	NA	1871	1	
Kid Nichols^{§}‡	NL	1900–1901	3	
Hugh Nicol‡	NL	1894	3	
The Only Nolan‡	NL	1881	2	
Pete Noonan‡	NL	1906–1907	2	
Ed Norris	NL	1978–1979	20	
Frank Norton†	NA	1872	1	
Lee Norton	AA	1890	1	
Carl Nothnagel	AL	1984	0 (Note: Umpire did not work any regular season games, but did appear in postseason or all-star games.)	
Les Novack	AL	1979	5	
Harrison Noxom	NA	1871	1	

=== O ===
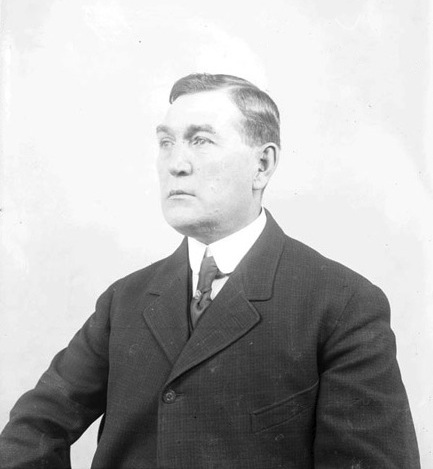
National Baseball Hall of Fame inductee Hank O'Day worked 3984 games between the AA, NL and PL, and umpired game one of the first modern World Series

O
Name	League(s)	Years	Games	Ref(s)
Henry Oberbeck‡	UA	1884	3	
Darby O'Brien‡	AA	1887–1888	2	
Frank O'Brien	AA	1890	12	
Jim O'Brien	AL	1979	10	
Joe O'Brien	AL, FL	1912, 1914–1915	121 (Note: 78 (AL, 1912, 1914), 43 (FL, 1915))	
Pete O'Brien‡ (second baseman)	AL	1907	1	
Pete O'Brien (umpire)	NA	1875	1	
William O'Brien	NL	1876	1	
O'Connor	NL	1982	1	
Arthur O'Connor	NL	1914	24	
Jack O'Connor‡	AA, NL	1889, 1893, 1901	5 (Note: 1 (AA, 1889), 4 (NL, 1893, 1901))	
Jim O'Connor	AL	1978–1979	17	
Tom O'Connor	AL	1979	3	
Hank O'Day*†‡	AA, NL, PL	1884, 1888–1890, 1895–1911, 1913, 1915–1927	3984 (Note: 1 (AA, 1884), 3981 (NL, 1888–90, 1895–1911, 1913, 1915–27), 2 (PL, 1890))	
Larry O'Dea	AA	1890	25	
Mike O'Dell	AL	1984	0	
Arthur Odlin	NL	1883	13	
Jim Odom	AL	1965–1974	1597	
Jake O'Donnell	AL	1968–1971	489	
Dan O'Leary‡	NL	1879	1	
Ed Oliger	NL	1979	5	
Silk O'Loughlin	AL	1902–1918	2574	
Andy Olsen	NL	1968–1980	1860	
Mike O'Neill‡	NL	1904	1	
Brian O'Nora^	AL, MLB	1992–present	3574 (Note: 710 (AL, 1992–99), 2864 (MLB, 2000–19, 2021–present))	
Red Ormsby	AL	1923–1941	2537	
Jim O'Rourke^{§}†‡	NL	1893–1894	30	
Dave Orr†	NL	1891	1	
Al Orth†‡	NL	1901, 1912–1917	505	
Roberto Ortiz^	MLB	2016–present	879	
William Osborne	NL	1876	2	
John O'Sullivan	NL	1922	4	
Orval Overall‡	NL	1905, 1910	3	
Brick Owens	NL, AL	1908, 1912–1913, 1916–1937	3323 (Note: 165 (NL, 1908, 1912–13), 3159 (AL, 1916–37))	

=== P ===
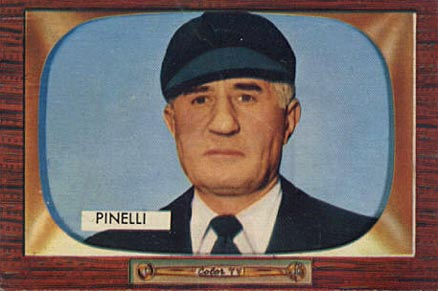
Babe Pinelli worked 3394 games in the NL

P
Name	League(s)	Years	Games	Ref(s)
Bill Paasch	AA	1887–1889	8	
Charlie Pabor‡	NA	1875	3	
Jim Pacheco	NL	1995	7	
Scott Packard	MLB	2000–2002	106	
Joe Padilla	NL	1995	7	
Steve Palermo	AL	1976–1991	1871	
Dave Pallone	NL	1979–1988	1361	
Rich Panas	AL	1978–1979	18	
Joe Paparella	AL	1946–1965	3143	
Doc Parker†	AL	1911	28	
Harry Parker	AA	1887	1	
Tiny Parker	NL	1936–1938	329	
Bill Parks‡	NA	1875	1	
Dallas Parks	AL	1979–1982, 1991, 1995	446	
Jonathan Parra^	MLB	2024–present	125	
Art Passarella	AL	1941–1952	1673	
Tony Patch	NL, AL	1978–1979	31 (Note: 20 (NL, 1978–79), 11 (AL, 1979))	
Casey Patten‡	AL	1903	1	
Tom Patterson‡	NA	1872, 1874	10	
Marcus Pattillo	MLB	2014–2015	94	
Jen Pawol	MLB	2025–present	18	
Jim Paylor	AL	1995	5	
Frank Peak	NA	1871	1	
Dickey Pearce†‡	NA, NL	1872, 1878, 1882	58 (Note: 1 (NA, 1872), 57 (NL, 1878, 1882))	
Frank Pears†	NL, AL	1897, 1903, 1905	26 (Note: 16 (NL, 1897, 1905), 10 (AL, 1903))	
Willard Pearson	NA	1872	1	
Heinie Peitz‡	NL	1901, 1906	3	
Chris Pelekoudas	NL	1960–1975	2487	
Barney Pelty‡	AL	1906	2	
Jimmy Peoples†‡	AA	1888–1890	45	
Dave Perez	AL	1979	15	
Ray Perez	NL	1979	3	
Bull Perrine	AL	1909–1912	507	
Fred Pfeffer‡	NL	1897	2	
Cy Pfirman	NL	1922–1936	2240	
Tommy Phelan	NL	1896	1	
Ed Phelps‡	NL	1912	2	
Nealy Phelps‡	NA	1874	3	
Deacon Phillippe‡	NL	1903	1	
Dave Phillips	AL, MLB	1971–1999, 2001–2002	3933 (Note: 3858 (AL, 1971–99), 75 (MLB, 2001–02))	
Horace Phillips‡	AA	1882	1	
Jerry Phipps	AL	1978–1979	12	
Gracie Pierce†‡	AA, NL, PL	1882, 1884, 1887, 1890, 1892–1893	144 (Note: 4 (AA, 1882, 1884), 83 (NL, 1887, 1892–93), 57 (PL, 1890))	
Israel Pike‡	NA	1875	1	
Lip Pike†‡	AA, NL	1887, 1889–1890	5 (Note: 2 (AA, 1887, 1889), 3 (NL, 1890))	
Mike Pilato	AL	1995	6	
Babe Pinelli†	NL	1935–1956	3394	
George Pipgras†	AL	1938–1946	1145	
Joe Pomponi	NL	1979, 1984	10	
Larry Poncino	NL, MLB	1985–1988, 1991–1999, 2002–2007	1961 (Note: 1145 (NL, 1985–88, 1991–99), 816 (MLB, 2002–07))	
Alan Porter^	MLB	2010–present	1767	
Charles Porter	NA	1874	1	
Scott Potter	NL	1991–1997	89	
Jack Powell	NL	1923–1924, 1933	95	
Charles Power	UA, NL	1884, 1893–1895, 1902	76 (Note: 2 (UA, 1884), 74 (NL, 1893–95, 1902))	
Doc Powers‡	AL	1902	1	
Phil Powers†‡	NL	1879, 1881, 1886–1891	529	
W. Powers	NA	1872–1873, 1875	9	
Al Pratt†	NL, AA	1879–1880, 1883, 1886–1887	54 (Note: 34 (NL, 1879–89, 1887), 20 (AA, 1883, 1886))	
Lester Pratt	AL	1979	14	
Tom Pratt†‡	NA, NL	1871–1873, 1886	9 (Note: 5 (NA, 1871–73), 4 (NL, 1886))	
Paul Pryor	NL	1961–1981	3094	
Frank Pulli	NL	1972–1999	3774	
Al Purduski	AL	1979	4	
Joe Puskaric	NL	1976	1	

=== Q ===
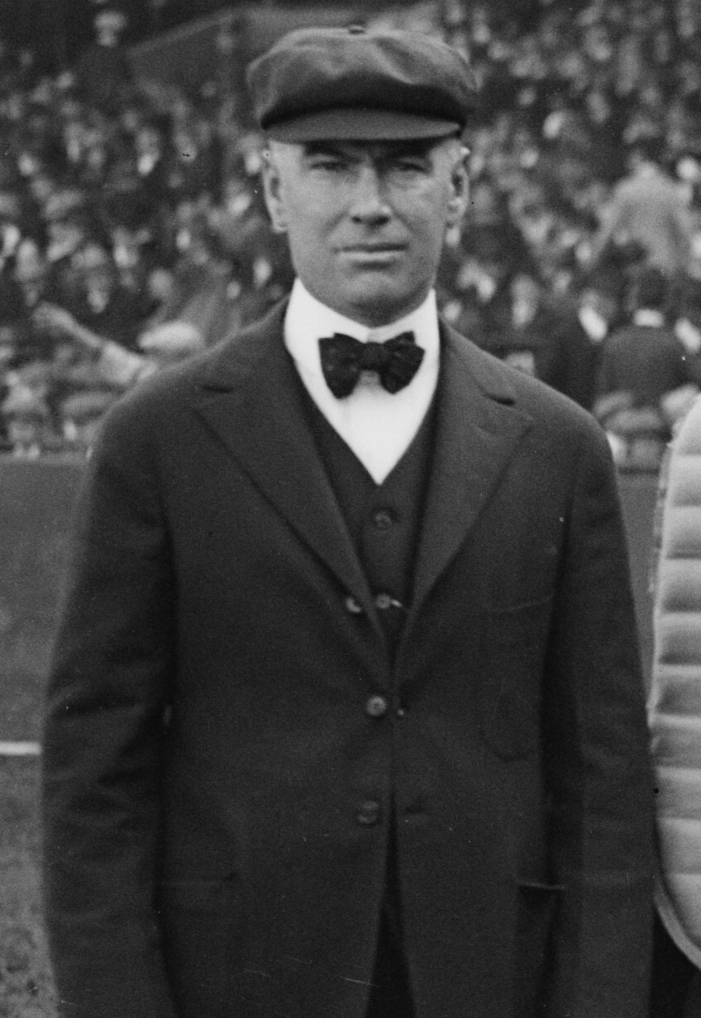
Canadian Baseball Hall of Fame inductee Ernie Quigley worked 3356 games in the NL

Q
Name	League(s)	Years	Games	Ref(s)
Arthur Queisser	FL	1914	4	
Joe Quest†	NL	1886–1887	69	
Jim Quick	NL	1974, 1976–1998	2987	
Ernie Quigley	NL	1913–1938	3356	
A. J. Quinn	AA	1886	19	
Billy Quinn	AA, NL	1884–1885, 1887, 1889–1890	64 (Note: 55 (AA, 1884–85), 9 (NL, 1887, 1889–90))	
Joe Quinn†‡ (catcher)	NL	1881–1882	25	
Joe Quinn‡ (second baseman)	NL	1894, 1896	2	
John Quinn	AL	1935–1942	1247	
Paddy Quinn‡	NA, NL	1875–1876	3 (Note: 1 (NA, 1875), 2 (NL, 1876))	

=== R ===
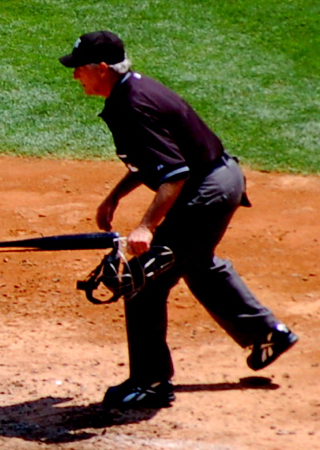
Mike Reilly worked 4491 games between the AL and MLB

R
Name	League(s)	Years	Games	Ref(s)
David Rackley^	MLB	2010–present	1479	
John Radcliff‡	NA	1873	1	
Jim Rains	NL	1978–1979	13	
Shawn Rakos	MLB	2008–2009	11	
Charlie Ramos^	MLB	2020–present	529	
R. Ramsay	NA	1875	1	
Dick Ramsey	AA	1887	1	
Larry Randall	NL	1995	5	
Tony Randazzo^	NL, MLB	1999–present	2766 (Note: 30 (NL, 1999), 2736 (MLB, 2000–07, 2009–19, 2021, 2023–present))	
Ed Rapuano	NL, MLB	1990–2012	2846 (Note: 1219 (NL, 1990–99), 1627 (MLB, 2000–12))	
Joseph Rastall	NA	1872	1	
Bruce Ravan	AL	1995	6	
Tom Ravashiere	AL	1979	7	
Al Reach‡	NA	1872–1875	6	
Beans Reardon	NL	1926–1949	3515	
Alman Redheffer	NL	1895	1	
Rick Reed	AL, MLB	1979–2010	3392 (Note: 2397 (AL, 1979–99), 995 (MLB, 2000–10))	
Icicle Reeder‡	AA	1884	1	
Jeremie Rehak^	MLB	2018–present	843	
Billy Reid†	NL	1882	6	
Hugh Reid‡	NA	1871, 1873–1874	6	
Charles Reilly	NL	1880	3	
Charlie Reilly‡	NL	1892, 1894–1895	4	
Mike Reilly	AL, MLB	1977–2010	4491 (Note: 3095 (AL, 1977–99), 1396 (MLB, 2000–10))	
Travis Reininger	MLB	2005–2008	75	
Charlie Reising‡	AA	1882	1	
Heinie Reitz‡	NL	1895	1	
Charlie Reliford	AL, MLB	1989–2009	2278 (Note: 1199 (AL, 1989–99), 1079 (MLB, 2000–09))	
Jack Remsen‡	NA, NL	1873–1874, 1880	4 (Note: 2 (NA, 1873–74), 2 (NL, 1880))	
Dutch Rennert	NL	1973–1992	2693	
D. J. Reyburn^	MLB	2008–present	1749	
Jim Reynolds	AL, MLB	1999–2022	2815 (Note: 62 (AL, 1999), 2753 (MLB, 2000–22))	
Billy Rhines‡	NL	1891, 1896	2	
Eugene Rhoads	NL	1887	1	
Dennis Riccio	NL	1979	17	
Len Riccio	AL, NL	1979	6 (Note: 2 (AL, 1979), 4 (NL, 1979))	
Rice	AA	1885	1	
Bob Rice	AL	1979	18	
John Rice	AL	1955–1973	2990	
J. M. Richards	NL	1880	1	
Hardy Richardson‡	NL	1892	1	
Lee Richmond‡	NL	1883	1	
Rich Rieker	NL, MLB	1992–2001	1001 (Note: 789 (NL, 1992–99), 212 (MLB, 2000–01))	
Mike Riggins	NL	1995	4	
Jeremy Riggs^	MLB	2020–present	434	
Cy Rigler	NL	1906–1922, 1924–1935	4140	
Billy Riley†	NL, AA	1880, 1882, 1885	18 (Note: 8 (NL, 1880), 10 (AA, 1882, 1885))	
Mark Ripperger^	MLB	2010–present	1449	
Steve Rippley	NL, MLB	1983–2003	2514 (Note: 2109 (NL, 1983–99), 404 (MLB, 2000–03))	
F. Ritchie	NL	1876	2	
John Robb	AA	1886	1	
Scotty Robb	NL, AL	1947–1953	869 (Note: 662 (NL, 1947–52), 207 (AL, 1952–53))	
Lenny Roberts	NL	1953	72	
Bill Robinson	AL	1978–1979	2	
Val Robinson‡	NA	1872–1873	4	
Wilbert Robinson^{§}‡	NL	1898	1	
Adam Rocap†	NL	1876	1	
Armando Rodriguez	AL	1974–1975	318	
Gus Rodriguez	NL	1995	6	
Rocky Roe	AL, MLB	1979–2001	2771 (Note: 2600 (AL, 1979–99), 171 (MLB, 2000–01))	
Bob Roesner	AL	1978–1979	17	
George Rogers	NA	1872	1	
Mort Rogers	NA	1871–1872	13	
Roll	NL	1876	1	
Eddie Rommel†	AL	1938–1959	3364	
Randy Rosenberg	MLB	2020–2023	51	
Bill Rosenberry	NL	1995	5	
Robert Ross	AA	1882, 1884	14	
Frank Roth†	AL	1923	1	
Roy Roth	NL, AL	1978–1979	33 (Note: 21 (NL, 1978–79), 12 (AL, 1979))	
Hank Rountree	NL, AL	1978–1979, 1991	27 (Note: 26 (NL, 1978–79), 1 (AL, 1991))	
Jack Rowe‡	NL	1881	1	
Pants Rowland	AL	1923–1927	752	
Frank Rudderham	NL	1907–1908	121	
Joe Rue	AL	1938–1947	1516	
Gus Ruhl	AA	1882	2	
Dick Runchey	AL	1979, 1984	6	
Brian Runge	NL, MLB	1999–2012	1564 (Note: 83 (NL, 1999), 1481 (MLB, 2000–12))	
Ed Runge	AL	1954–1970	2638	
Paul Runge	NL	1973–1997	3196	
Jimmy Ryan‡	NL	1892	1	
Johnny Ryan†‡	NA, AA	1872, 1875, 1882	6 (Note: 4 (NA, 1872, 1875), 2 (AA, 1882))	
Red Ryan	NL	1946	1	
Cy Ryberg	NL	1995	6	

=== S ===
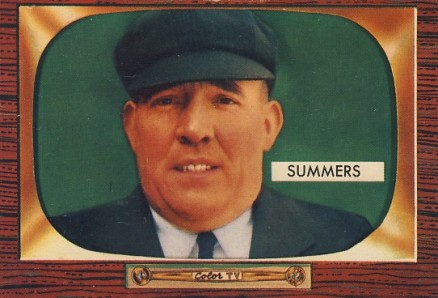
Bill Summers worked 4119 games in the AL

S
Name	League(s)	Years	Games	Ref(s)
Harry Sage‡	AA	1890	1	
Al Salerno	AL	1961–1968	1110	
Jack Samuels	MLB	2001, 2003–2005	72	
Ben Sanders‡	NL	1889	1	
Darold Satchell	AL	1970	0	
Joe Sawchuk	AL	1978–1979	19	
Dent Sawyer	NA	1871	1	
Lou Say‡	NL	1879	1	
Fred Schaaf	NL	1995	7	
Harry Schafer‡	NA	1875	1	
Cliff Schaller	NL	1978–1979	9	
Jim Schaly	AL	1995	6	
Al Scheel	AL	1979	4	
Gus Scheu	NL	1880	1	
Stu Scheurwater^	MLB	2014–present	1119	
Don Schirmer	AL	1979	17	
John Schleyer	NL	1979	1	
Boss Schmidt‡	AL	1906–1907	3	
Henry Schmidt‡	AL	1903	1	
Louis Schrader	NA, AA	1875, 1890	3 (Note: 2 (NA, 1875), 1 (AA, 1890))	
Joe Schratz	NL	1976, 1979	18	
Ossee Schreckengost‡	AL	1903	2	
Paul Schrieber	NL, MLB	1997–2015	2207 (Note: 288 (NL, 1997–99), 1919 (MLB, 2000–15))	
Pop Schriver‡	NL	1901	7	
Bobby Schroeder	NL	1978–1979	10	
John Schuester	NA	1874–1875	3	
Don Schulte	AL	1979	9	
Harry Schwarts	AL	1960–1962	338	
Hank Schwarz	AL	1995	6	
John Scofield	NA, NL	1871, 1879	3 (Note: 1 (NA, 1871), 2 (NL, 1879))	
Dale Scott	AL, MLB	1985–2017	3897 (Note: 1715 (AL, 1985–99), 2177 (MLB, 2000–17))	
Jim Scott (umpire)	NL	1978–1979	18	
Jim Scott† (pitcher)	NL	1930–1931	252	
John Sears	NA	1873	3	
Ziggy Sears	NL	1934–1945	1643	
Frank Secory†	NL	1952–1970	2977	
Chris Segal^	MLB	2014–present	1263	
Frank Sellman†	NA, AA	1873, 1882	5 (Note: 2 (NA, 1873), 3 (AA, 1882))	
Count Sensenderfer‡	NA	1872–1875	13	
Paul Sentell†	NL	1922–1923	157	
Billy Serad‡	NL, AA	1884, 1888	2 (Note: 1 (NL, 1884), 1 (AA, 1888))	
Ed Seward†	NL	1892–1893	27	
George Seward†	NL, AA, UA	1876–1878, 1884	108 (Note: 21 (NL, 1876–78), 54 (AA, 1884), 33 (UA, 1884))	
Spike Shannon†	FL	1914–1915	177	
Mick Sharkey	NL	1978–1979	10	
Bob Sharp	NL	1979	16	
Duane Shaw	AL	1979	4	
Jim Sheasgreen	NL	1981	2	
W. L. Shepard	NL	1879	1	
Jack Sheridan	PL, NL, AL	1890, 1892–1893, 1896–1897, 1901–1914	2177 (Note: 81 (PL, 1890), 288 (NL, 1892–93, 1896–97), 1808 (AL, 1901–14))	
Shang Sherman	AA	1890	1	
Jim Shewmake	AL	1978	1	
John Shulock	AL, MLB	1979–2002	3050 (Note: 2722 (AL, 1979–99), 328 (MLB, 2000–02))	
Fred Skelley	NL	1880	2	
Jim Skerrett	AA	1890	1	
Alex Skinner†	AA, NL	1886	8 (Note: 1 (AA, 1886), 7 (NL, 1886))	
Don Slattery	AL, NL	1979	11 (Note: 7 (AL, 1979), 4 (NL, 1979))	
Dave Slickenmeyer	AL, NL	1979, 1984, 1991, 1995	15 (Note: 9 (AL, 1979, 1991, 1995), 6 (NL, 1979))	
Harry Smail	NL	1979	16	
Al Smith	AL	1960–1964	798	
Billy Smith (umpire)	NL	1898–1899	114	
Billy Smith‡ (pitcher)	NL	1886	1	
Eb Smith	NA	1872	1	
Edgar Smith‡	NL	1890	1	
Edward Smith‡	NL	1883	1	
Fred Smith‡	AA	1890	1	
Gene Smith	NL	1979	2	
George Smith	NA, AA	1872, 1887	2 (Note: 1 (NA, 1872), 1 (AA, 1887))	
Gustavus Smith	NA	1872	1	
Harry Smith‡	NL	1903	1	
Heinie Smith‡	NL	1901	4	
Phenomenal Smith‡	AA	1887	1	
Pop Smith†‡	NL, AA	1876, 1881–1882, 1886	34 (Note: 10 (NL, 1876, 1881), 24 (AA, 1882, 1886))	
Vinnie Smith†	NL	1957–1965	1243	
John Sneed†	AA	1885	4	
George Sneeden	NL	1895	1	
Carey Snoddy	NL	1877	1	
Pop Snyder†‡	NA, AA, PL, NL	1875, 1886, 1890–1893, 1895, 1898–1901	390 (Note: 1 (NA, 1875), 14 (AA, 1886, 1891), 53 (PL, 1890), 322 (NL, 1892–93, 1895, 1898–1901))	
Hank Soar	AL	1950–1975, 1977–1978	3595	
Benjamin Sommer	NL, AA	1876, 1883	22 (Note: 1 (NL, 1876), 21 (AA, 1883))	
Joe Sommer‡	AA	1888	1	
Andy Sommers†‡	NL	1889–1890, 1893	5	
Darren Spagnardi	MLB	2002–2004	92	
John Spange	NL	1991	1	
Fred Spenn	AL	1977–1980, 1991	364	
Pat Spieler	MLB	2000–2002	76	
Mike Spinelli	NL	1979	12	
Charlie Sprague‡	AA	1890	1	
Bill Sprincz	AL	1978–1979	13	
Marty Springstead	AL	1966–1985	3010	
Eddie Stack†	NL	1934	1	
Jack Stafford	NL, AL	1906–1907	132 (Note: 1 (NL, 1906), 131 (AL, 1907))	
Billy Stage	NL	1894–1897	49	
George Stahl	NA	1875	1	
Harry Staley‡	NL	1892, 1895	2	
Calvin Stambaugh	NL	1877–1879	17	
Jack Stansell	NL	1979	1	
H. D. Stanwood	NA	1872	1	
Dolly Stark	NL	1928–1935, 1937–1940	1550	
Bill Stearns†	UA	1884	9	
Ed Stein‡	NL	1890, 1894, 1896	4	
Paul Steinburg	NL	1909	6	
Mel Steiner	NL	1961–1972	1918	
Harry Steinfeldt‡	NL	1905	1	
Dick Stello	NL	1968–1987	2764	
John Stevens	AL	1948–1971, 1973, 1975	3346	
Bill Stewart	NL	1933–1954	3192	
Bob Stewart	AL	1958–1970	1958	
Ernie Stewart	AL	1941–1945	688	
John Stewart	NL	1979, 1984	3	
Gat Stires†	NA	1875	1	
Jack Stivetts‡	AA, NL	1891, 1894	3 (Note: 2 (AA, 1891), 1 (NL, 1894))	
Otis Stockdale†‡	NL, FL	1895, 1915	14 (Note: 13 (NL, 1895, 1915), 1 (FL, 1915))	
Joseph Stophlet	NA	1871	1	
Murray Strey	NL	1978–1979	15	
Cub Stricker‡	NL	1892	1	
Elmer Stricklett‡	NL	1907	2	
George Strief†	NL	1880, 1890	54	
Ed Sudol	NL	1957–1977	3245	
Joe Sugden‡	NL	1897	2	
Dave Sullivan	NL, AA, UA	1882–1885, 1887–1889	192 (Note: 102 (NL, 1882–83, 1885, 1887–89), 2 (AA, 1884), 88 (UA, 1884))	
Jerry Sullivan	AA, NL	1887	51 (Note: 23 (AA, 1887), 28 (NL, 1887))	
Jim Sullivan‡	NL	1896	1	
Marty Sullivan‡	NL	1889	2	
Mike Sullivan‡	NL	1897	2	
Sleeper Sullivan‡	NL	1881	2	
Ted Sullivan†	NL, AA	1880, 1887	25 (Note: 11 (NL, 1880), 14 (AA, 1887))	
Bill Summers	AL	1933–1959	4119	
James Sumner	NL	1876–1878	28	
Bill Supple	NL	1906	7	
Sy Sutcliffe‡	NL	1889, 1892	3	
Mule Suttles^{§}†	NNL II	1948	0	
Ezra Sutton‡	NA, NL	1875–1876	5 (Note: 4 (NA, 1875), 1 (NL, 1876))	
Marty Swandell†‡	NA	1871–1874	28	
Ed Swartwood†	NL	1884, 1898–1900	429	
Charlie Sweasy†‡	NA, NL	1871, 1873–1874, 1879	10 (Note: 9 (NA, 1871, 1873–74), 1 (NL, 1879))	
Charlie Sweeney‡	AA	1887	1	
George Sweeney	AL	1979	5	
Monroe Sweeney	NL	1924–1926	412	
Charles Swenson	AL	1979	7	
Frank Sylvester	NL, MLB	1995, 2004	6 (Note: 5 (NL, 1995), 1 (MLB, 2004))	
Lou Sylvester†	AA	1888	1	

=== T ===
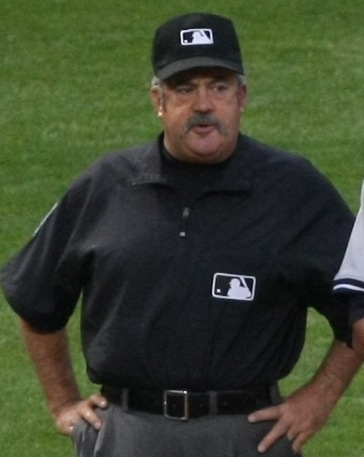
Tim Tschida worked 3358 games between the AL and MLB

T
Name	League(s)	Years	Games	Ref(s)
Frank Tabacchi	AL	1956–1959	516	
John Talbot	AA	1887	1	
Jesse Tannehill‡	NL	1897, 1901–1902	5	
Terry Tata	NL	1973–1999	3742	
Pop Tate‡	NL	1888	1	
William Tate	NA	1874	9	
Jack Taylor‡ (1890s pitcher)	NL	1899	1	
Jack Taylor‡ (1900s pitcher)	NL	1905	1	
Joe Bob Taylor	AL	1979	7	
Walter Taylor	AA	1890	9	
Tom Telford	NL	1979	15	
John Tener‡	NL, PL	1889–1890	2 (Note: 1 (NL, 1889), 1 (PL, 1890))	
Russ Terlop	AL	1979	2	
Adonis Terry†‡	AA, NL, AL	1884, 1888, 1892, 1895–1896, 1900–1901	51 (Note: 6 (AA, 1884, 1888), 43 (NL, 1882, 1895–96, 1900), 2 (AL, 1901))	
Ted Theilander	AL	1979	5	
Derek Thomas^	MLB	2023–present	314	
Mike Thompson	AL	1978–1979	18	
R. J. Thompson	MLB	2008–2009	4	
Todd Tichenor^	MLB	2007–present	2077	
Mike Tiernan‡	NL	1895	1	
Ed Tighe	NA	1871	5	
Otis Tilden	NL	1876, 1880	26	
Chris Tiller	MLB	2008–2010	64	
Hank Tillman	NL, AL	1978–1979	8 (Note: 2 (NL, 1978–79), 6 (AL, 1979))	
Timblin	UA	1884	3	
Tim Timmons	NL, MLB	1999–2021	2746 (Note: 10 (NL, 1999), 2736 (MLB, 2000–21))	
Charles Tindill	NL	1890, 1896	2	
Tinney	AA	1882	1	
Nate Tomlinson^	MLB	2020–present	468	
Steve Toole†	NL, AA	1888, 1890	39 (Note: 1 (NL, 1888), 38 (AA, 1890))	
Carlos Torres^	MLB	2015–present	1148	
Alex Tosi^	MLB	2019–present	544	
George Townsend‡	AA	1890	2	
Bill Traffley‡	AA	1884	1	
Vic Travis	AL	1995	6	
Willie Traynor	MLB	2025–present	66	
Fred Treacey‡	NA	1871, 1873, 1875	4	
Les Treitel	NL	1978–1979	11	
Dick Tremblay	NL	1970, 1979	90	
Harry Truby†	NL	1909	58	
Tim Tschida	AL, MLB	1987–2012	3358 (Note: 1698 (AL, 1987–99), 1660 (MLB, 2000–12))	
John Tumpane^	MLB	2010–present	1483	
William Tunison	AA	1885–1886	52	
Leo Turner	AL	1978	1	
Ben Tuthill	NL	1895	2	
Larry Twitchell‡	NL	1894	4	
Columbus Tyler	NA	1871–1873	5	

=== U ===
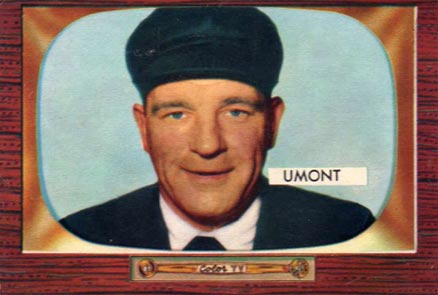
Frank Umont worked 3147 games in the AL

U
Name	League(s)	Years	Games	Ref(s)
Jake Uhlenhopp	MLB	2009	1	
George Ulrich	AL	1995	5	
Frank Umont	AL	1954–1973	3147	
Woody Urchak	AL	1978–1979	13	
Emmett Urell	NA	1873	1	
Jim Uremovich	AL	1991, 1995	7	
Dick Urlage	NL	1979, 1991	6	

=== V ===
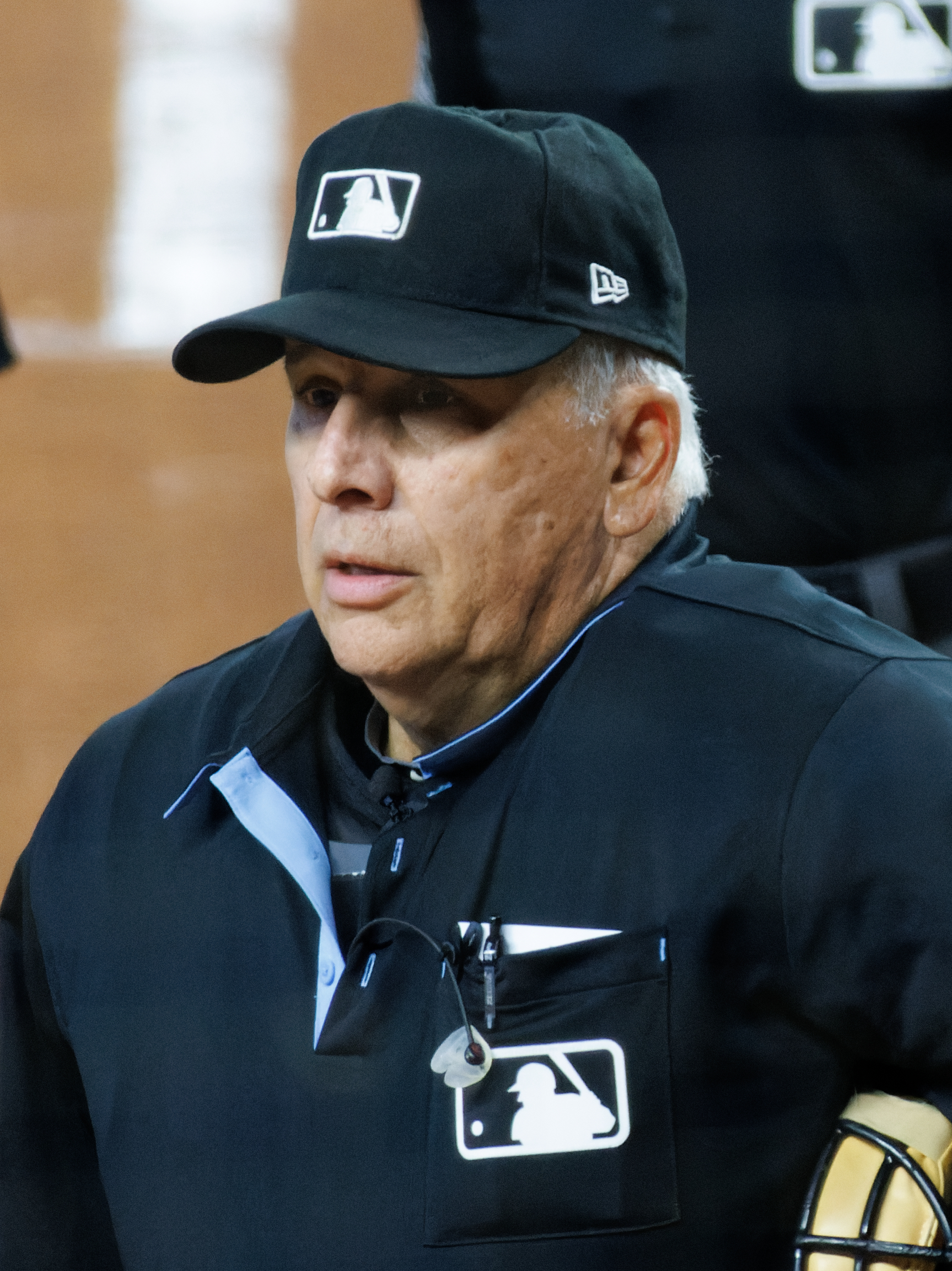
Larry Vanover worked 3470 games between the NL and MLB

V
Name	League(s)	Years	Games	Ref(s)
Bill Valentine	AL	1963–1968	947	
John Valentine†	AA, NL	1884–1888	447 (Note: 263 (AA, 1884–87), 184 (NL, 1887–88))	
Junior Valentine^	MLB	2020–present	571	
Ike Van Burkalow	AA	1888	1	
Eugene Van Court	NL	1884	68	
Benjamin Van Delft	NA	1875	1	
Roy Van Graflan	AL	1927–1933	1034	
Larry Vanover	NL, MLB	1991, 1993–2024	3470 (Note: 827 (NL, 1991, 1993–99), 2643 (MLB, 2000–24))	
Charles Van Sickle	FL	1914	67	
Mike Vanvleet	MLB	2000–2002	247	
Ed Vargo	NL	1960–1983	3555	
Farmer Vaughn‡	AA, NL	1891–1892, 1899	3 (Note: 1 (AA, 1891), 2 (NL, 1892, 1899))	
Tony Venzon	NL	1957–1971	2226	
Lee Viau‡	AA, NL	1888, 1891	2 (Note: 1 (AA, 1888), 1 (NL, 1891))	
Tom Vickery‡	NL	1890	1	
Jansen Visconti^	MLB	2018–present	882	
Vic Voltaggio	AL	1977–1996	2218	
E. C. Voltz	NA	1871–1872	3	
Clint Vondrak^	MLB	2020–present	504	

=== W ===
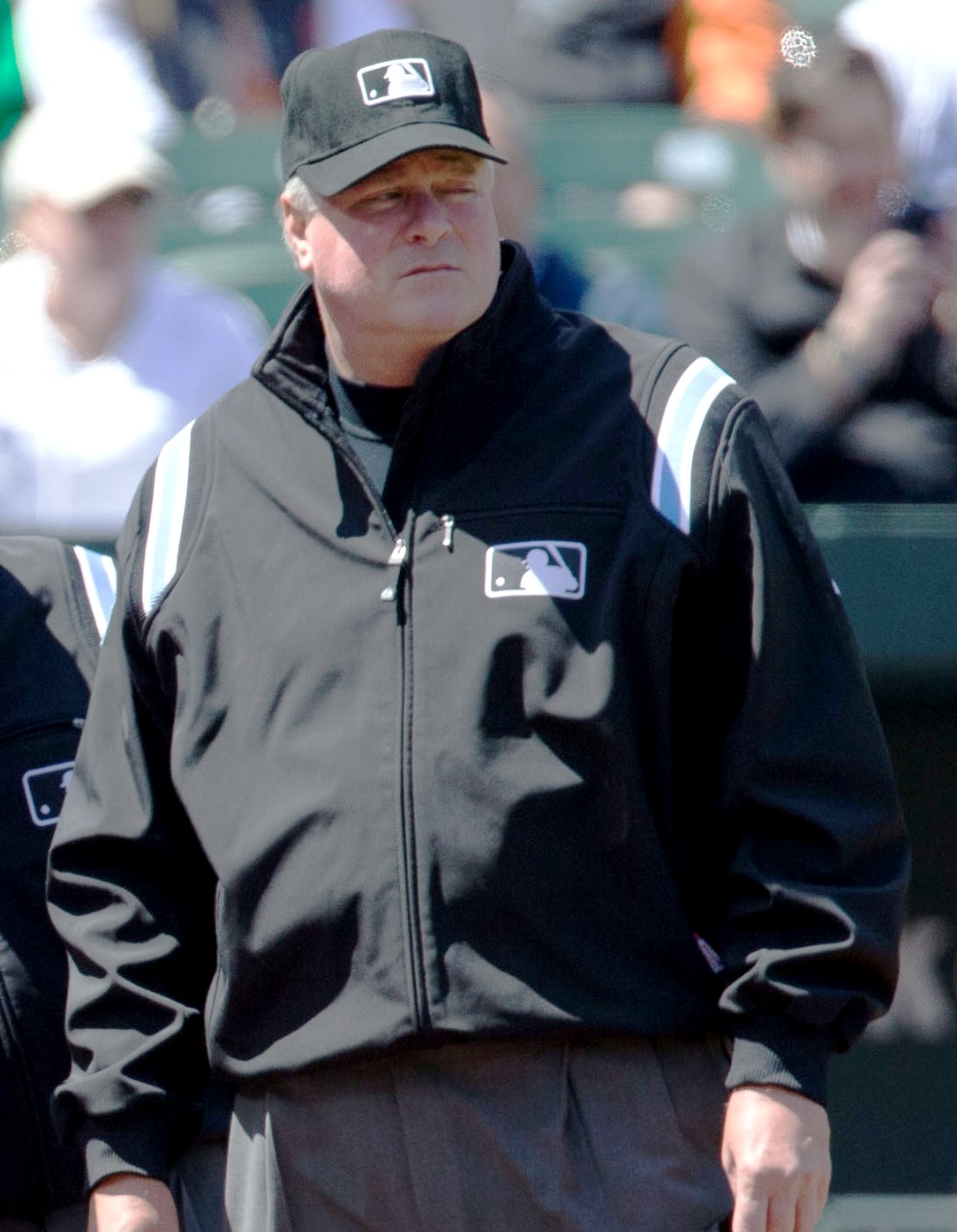
Tim Welke worked 4216 games between the AL and MLB, and his brother Bill worked 2816 games

W
Name	League(s)	Years	Games	Ref(s)
Ben Wade	NL	1879–1880	2	
Larry Walding	AL	1995	5	
Tom Walker‡	NL	1905	1	
William Walker	NL	1876–1878	29	
Joe Wall‡	NL	1901	1	
Bobby Wallace†‡	NL, AL	1895, 1915	112 (Note: 1 (NL, 1895), 111 (AL, 1915))	
Jim Waller	NL	1979	1	
Brian Walsh^	MLB	2023–present	338	
Ed Walsh^{§}†	AL	1922	87	
Frank Walsh	NL	1961–1963	344	
Mike Walsh	NA, NL, AA	1875–1880, 1882–1888	304 (Note: 6 (NA, 1875), 62 (NL, 1876–80), 236 (AA, 1882–88))	
Walters	NL	1892–1893	3	
Bucky Walters‡	NL	1942, 1947	2	
Benny Walton	AL	1996	1	
G. W. Walton	NL	1876	3	
Harry Ward	NAL	1937–? (Note: With few exceptions, game logs noting umpires for the Negro major leagues currently only date back to the 1937 season.)	(Note: Game totals for Negro league umpires do not currently exist.)	
Monte Ward‡	NL	1888	1	
Wardell	NA	1874	1	
Lon Warneke†	NL	1949–1955	1055	
Al Warner	NL	1898–1900	138	
Jack Warner‡	NL, AL	1896–1897, 1901, 1903, 1998	6 (Note: 5 (NL, 1896–97, 1901, 1903), 1 (AL, 1908))	
L. B. Warren	NL	1876	1	
Frank Wash	NL	1877	3	
Fred Waterman‡	NA	1873	3	
Hal Weafer	AL	1943–1947	779	
Farmer Weaver‡	NL	1893	1	
Charles Weden	NL	1889–1890	7	
Mark Wegner^	NL, MLB	1998–present	3123 (Note: 136 (NL, 1998–99) 2987 (MLB, 2000–present))	
Stump Weidman†	NL	1896	55	
Jake Weimer‡	NL	1905, 1907	3	
Mickey Welch‡	NL	1881–1882, 1885–1886, 1888, 1890	7	
Bill Welke	AL, MLB	1999–2022	2816 (Note: 73 (AL, 1999), 2743 (MLB, 2000–22))	
Tim Welke	AL, MLB	1983–2015	4216 (Note: 2207 (AL, 1983–99), 2009 (MLB, 2000–15))	
Harry Wendelstedt	NL	1966–1998	4500	
Hunter Wendelstedt^	NL, MLB	1998–present	3078 (Note: 170 (NL, 1998–99), 2908 (MLB, 2000–present))	
Buck West‡	NL	1890	1	
Edward West	AA, NL	1885, 1887	9 (Note: 8 (AA, 1885, 1887), 1 (NL, 1885))	
George West	NL	1878	1	
Joe West	NL, MLB	1976–1999, 2002–2021	5460 (Note: 2991 (NL, 1976–99), 2469 (MLB, 2002–21))	
Frederick Westervelt	AL, FL, NL	1911–1912, 1915, 1922–1923	344 (Note: 151 (AL, 1911–12), 145 (FL, 1915), 49 (NL, 1922–23))	
Lee Weyer	NL	1962–1988	3827	
Gus Weyhing‡	AA, NL	1891, 1894, 1899–1900	4 (Note: 1 (AA, 1891), 3 (NL, 1894, 1899–1900))	
Bart Whaley	NL	1995	2	
Harry Wheeler‡	AA, UA	1882, 1884	2 (Note: 1 (AA, 1882), 1 (UA, 1884))	
Lew Whistler‡	NL	1891	1	
Deacon White^{§}‡	NL	1880	3	
Doc White‡	NL, AL	1902–1903	2 (Note: 1 (NL, 1902), 1 (AL, 1903))	
Gideon White	NL	1876–1878	11	
Horatio White	NA	1873	2	
Warren White‡	NA, NL	1874, 1876	3 (Note: 1 (NA, 1874), 2 (NL, 1876))	
Will White	NA	1875	1	
Jim Whitney‡	NL	1884, 1886, 1888	3	
Chad Whitson^	MLB	2014–present	1024	
Dan Wickham	NL	1990–1992	47	
Mark Widlowski	NL	1995	5	
William Wiegel	NA	1873–1874	3	
Wiggins	NA	1875	1	
Charles Wilbur	NL	1879	19	
John Wildey	NA	1871	2	
Kaiser Wilhelm‡	NL, FL	1904–1905, 1915	54 (Note: 1 (NL, 1904–05), 52 (FL, 1915))	
Gardner Willard	NA	1871	1	
Art Williams	NL	1972–1977	806	
Billy Williams	NL	1963–1987	3432	
Charlie Williams	NL, MLB	1978–2001	2810 (Note: 2695 (NL, 1978–99), 115 (MLB, 2000–01))	
Dale Williams (umpire)	NL, AL	1978–1979	23 (Note: 6 (NL, 1978–79), 17 (AL, 1979))	
Dale Williams‡ (pitcher)	NL	1876	1	
Lew Williams	MLB	2020–2023	33	
Ed Williamson‡	NL	1878	1	
Vic Willis^{§}‡	NL	1903	1	
Bob Willman	NL	1991, 1995	7	
Ryan Wills^	MLB	2020–present	628	
Walt Wilmot‡	NL	1897	1	
Bill Wilson‡	NL	1890, 1892–1893	9	
Frank Wilson	AL, NL	1921–1928	995 (Note: 212 (AL, 1921–22), 783 (NL, 1922–28))	
Jimmie Wilson‡	NL	1940	1	
John Wilson	NL	1887	14	
Parke Wilson‡	NL	1894–1896, 1899	5	
Zeke Wilson‡	NL	1896–1897, 1899	3	
Matt Winans	AL	1994	28	
George Winter‡	AL	1903, 1905	3	
Mike Winters	NL, MLB	1988–2019	3810 (Note: 1339 (NL, 1988–99), 2471 (MLB, 2000–19))	
Adam Wirth	NA	1875	2	
Sam Wise‡	NL	1889, 1893	2	
Quinn Wolcott^	MLB	2013–present	1360	
Chicken Wolf‡	NL	1893, 1895–1897	8	
Jim Wolf^	NL, MLB	1999–present	2952 (Note: 8 (NL, 1999), 2944 (MLB, 2020–present))	
Frank Wolke	NA	1871	2	
George Wood†‡	AA, NL	1886, 1889, 1891, 1898	93 (Note: 2 (AA, 1886, 1891), 91 (NL, 1889, 1898))	
Jimmy Wood†‡	NA, NL	1871, 1876	4 (Note: 2 (NA, 1871), 2 (NL, 1876))	
Tom Woodring	MLB	2014–2020	489	
Herb Worth‡	NA	1872	1	
Harry Wright^{§}‡	NA, NL	1875–1877, 1885	4 (Note: 1 (NA, 1875), (NL, 1876–77, 1885))	
Marvin Wright	AL	1995	6	
Parry Wright	AA	1884	2	
W. S. Wyckoff	NL	1892	1	

=== X ===
- None

=== Y ===
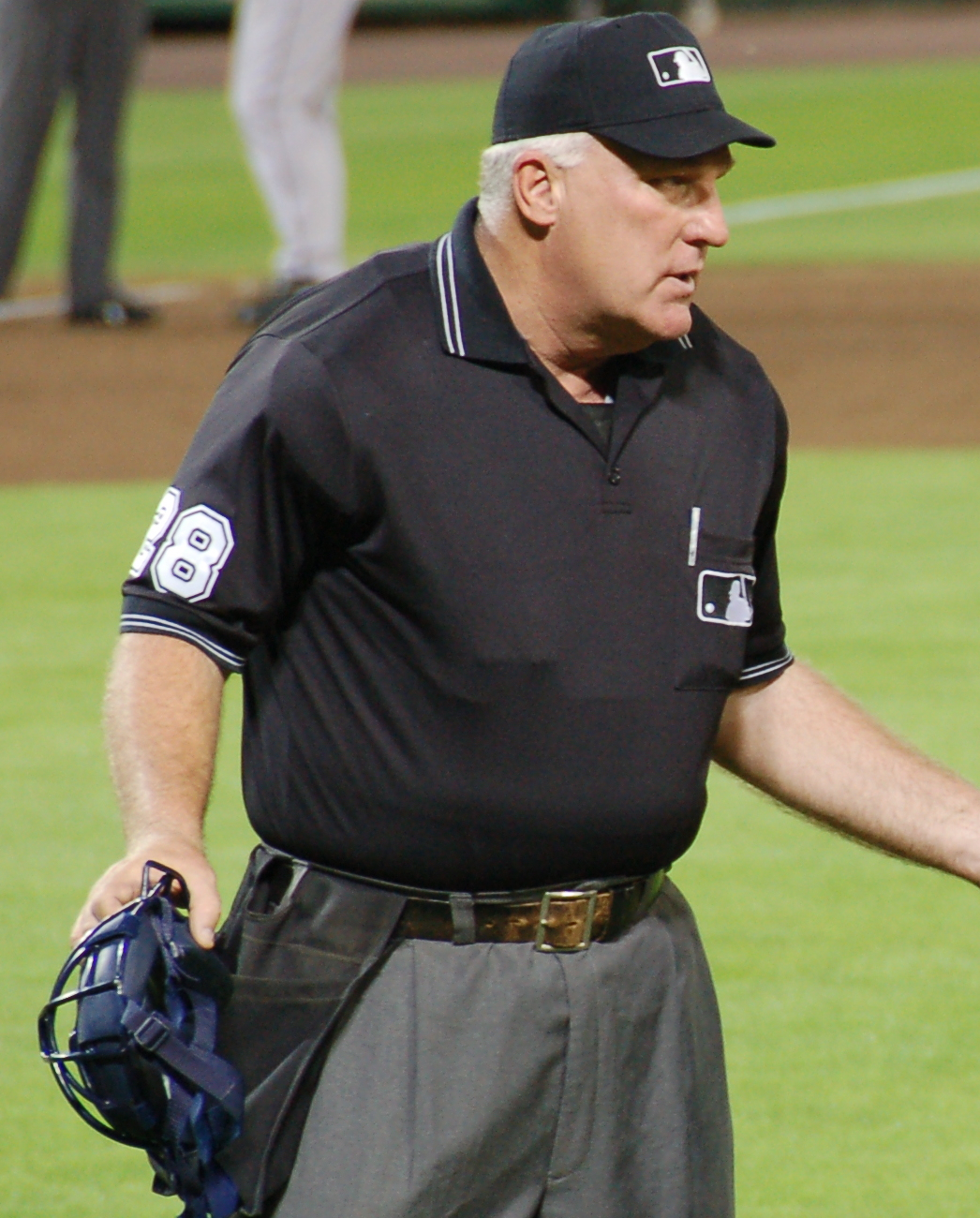
Larry Young worked 2848 games between the AL and MLB

Y
Name	League(s)	Years	Games	Ref(s)
George Yeager‡	NL	1901	1	
Dave Yeast	NL	1995	7	
Tom York†‡	NA, AA, NL	1874, 1886	52 (Note: 3 (NA, 1874), 16 (AA, 1886), 33 (NL, 1886))	
Ben Young	AA	1886–1887	20	
Cy Young^{§}‡	NL, AL	1896, 1903	4 (Note: 2 (NL, 1896), 2 (AL, 1903))	
Irv Young‡	NL	1905, 1907	2	
Joseph Young	NL, AA	1879, 1890	7 (Note: 6 (NL, 1879), 1 (AA, 1890))	
Larry Young	AL, MLB	1985–2007	2848 (Note: 1882 (AL, 1985–99), 966 (MLB, 2000–07))	
Nicholas Young	NA	1871–1875	71	

=== Z ===
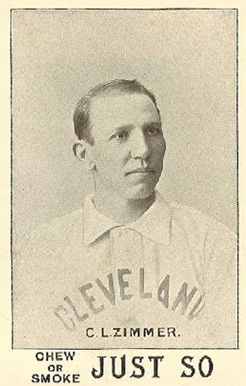
Major league catcher Chief Zimmer umpired 154 games between the AA and NL

Z
Name	League(s)	Years	Games	Ref(s)
Thomas Zacharias	NL	1890	52	
Chief Zimmer†‡	AA, NL	1888–1889, 1901, 1904	154 (Note: 1 (AA, 1888), 153 (NL, 1889, 1901, 1904))	
Jerry Zimmerman	AL	1978	1	
Larry Zirbel	AL	1979, 1984	13	
Dick Zivic	AL	1984	0	
Rico Zuccaro	AL	1978	1	

== See also ==
- List of Major League Baseball umpires (A–F)
- List of Major League Baseball umpires (G–M)
- List of Major League Baseball umpiring leaders
