= Manuel González =

Manuel González or Gonzales may refer to:

== Arts and entertainment ==
- Manuel Asur González García ("Manuel Asur", born 1947), Spanish writer in the Asturian language
- Manuel González González Spanish philologist, member of the Royal Galician Academy
- Manuel González Méndez (1843–1909), Spanish painter, musician and sculptor
- Manuel González Prada (1844–1918), Peruvian writer, philosopher and politician
- Manuel González Zeledón (1864–1936), Costa Rican writer
- Manuel González (actor) (died 1946), Spanish actor
- Manuel Gonzales (1913–1993), Spanish-American Disney comics artist

== Politics and government ==
- Manuel González de Candamo e Iriarte (1841–1904), Peruvian politician, president in 1903–1904
- Manuel González de Cosío (1836–1913), Mexican politician, científico, Secretary of War and Navy in 1905–1911
- Manuel González Cosío y Rivera (1915–2002), Mexican politician
- Manuel González Flores (1833–1893), Mexican military officer, politician, president in 1880–1884
- Manuel González García (bishop) (1877–1940), Spanish Catholic bishop, 1935–1940
- Manuel González Hinojosa (1912–2006), Mexican politician, president of the National Action Party
- Manuel González-Hontoria y Fernández-Ladreda (1878–1954), Spanish politician and diplomat
- Manuel González Salmón (1778–1832), Spanish politician and diplomat, twice prime minister
- Manuel González Vilches (1882–1954), Chilean newspaperman and politician

== Sports ==
=== Association football (soccer) ===
- Manuel González (footballer, 1917-1988), Spanish footballer
- Manuel González (footballer, 1929-2013), Spanish footballer
- Manuel González (footballer, born 1943), Spanish footballer
- Manuel González (footballer, born 1953), Spanish footballer
- Manuel González (footballer, born 1991), Argentine footballer

=== Other sports ===
- Manuel González Pató (1913–1973), Puerto Rican athletics coach
- Manuel González (sport shooter) (born 1934), Colombian Olympic sport shooter
- Manuel González Rivera (1936–2004), Mexican professional wrestler best known under the ring name Dr. Wagner
- Manuel González (fencer) (born 1950), Cuban Olympic fencer
- Manuel Gonzalez (sailor) (born 1957), Chilean sailor
- Manuel González (athlete) (born 1963), Spanish Olympic sprinter
- Manuel González (equestrian) (born 1994), Mexican equestrian
- Manuel González (motorcyclist) (born 2002), Spanish motorcyclist
- Manuel González Guerra (1914–1997), Cuban baseball executive and president of the International Baseball Federation

== Locations ==
- Colonia Manuel González, Veracruz, Mexico
- Manuel González (Mexico City Metrobús), a BRT station in Mexico City

== See also ==
- Juan Manuel González (disambiguation), several people
- Manuel T. Gonzaullas
