= Jen Pawol =

American baseball umpire (born 1976)

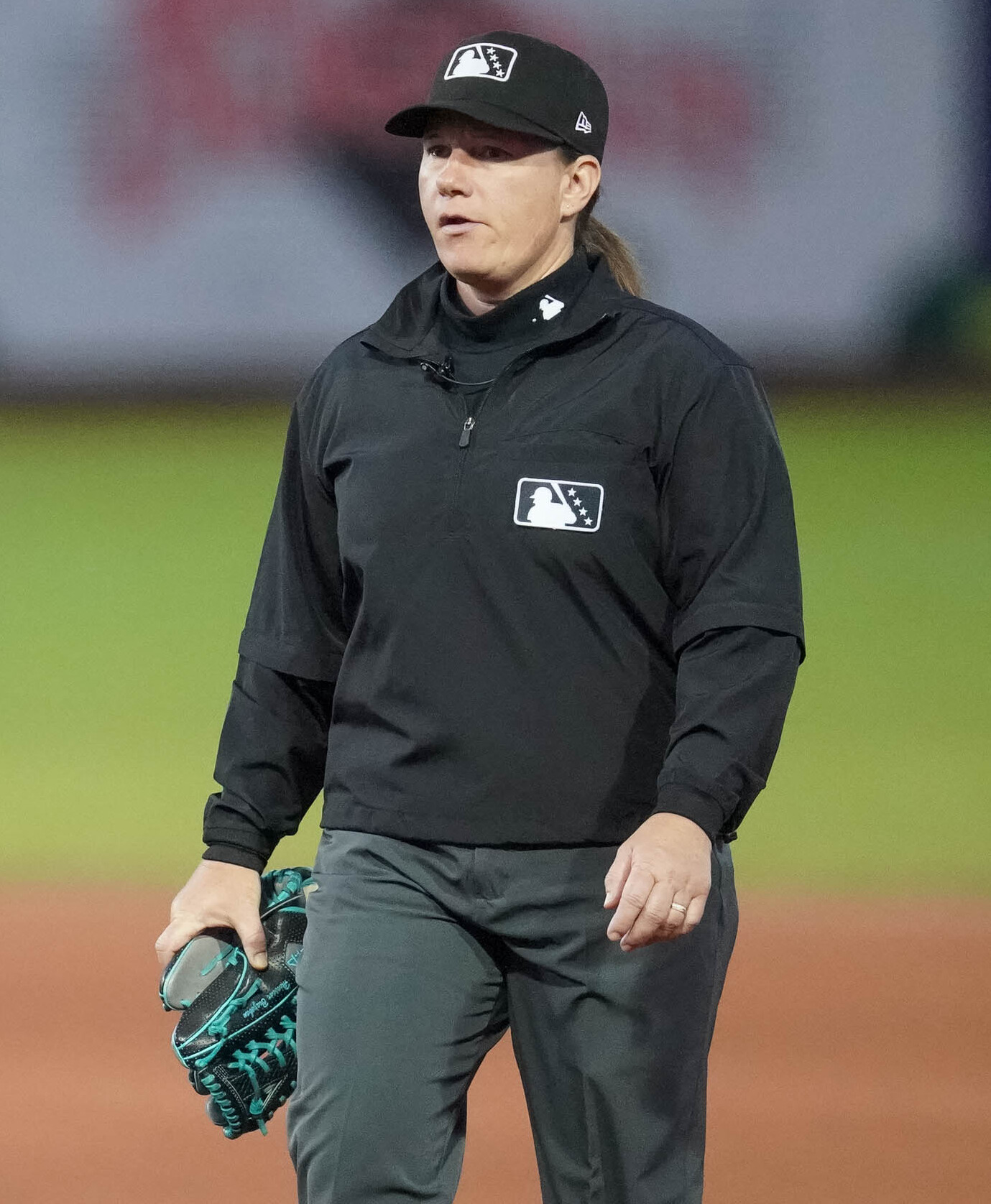
- Pawol at Werner Park in 2024

MLB – No. 95
- Umpire
- Born: December 29, 1976 (age 49); West Milford, New Jersey, U.S.

MLB debut
- August 9, 2025

Crew information
- Umpiring crew: Unassigned (Triple-A call-up list)

Career highlights and awards
- Special Assignments: Triple-A National Championship Game (2023); First woman to umpire a regular season MLB game (August 9, 2025)
Medals
Women's baseball
Representing United States
Women's Baseball World Series
Gold medal – first place	2001 Toronto	Team

Jennifer Pawol (born December 29, 1976) is an American baseball umpire in Major League Baseball (MLB). She became the first female umpire in MLB when she debuted on August 9, 2025. She is the seventh woman to work as a professional baseball umpire. Since she was called up to MLB, she has worn uniform number 95.

== Early life ==
Attending West Milford High School in West Milford, New Jersey, Pawol played soccer and softball, attending Hofstra University on an athletic scholarship and playing as a catcher in Division I softball for the Pride. It was during this time that she began umpiring softball games. She was paid $15 per game.

In 2001, she was part of the gold medal winning United States team (the precursor to the United States women's national baseball team) in the Women's Baseball World Series, which was the first recognized international women's baseball tournament.

Before going into professional umpiring, Pawol was an art teacher. She is a graduate of the Pratt Institute (B.F.A.) and Hunter College (M.F.A.). During this time, she continued to umpire part-time in amateur softball leagues.

== Umpiring career ==
=== Minor leagues ===
After umpiring softball games part-time for 11 years, Pawol decided to go into umpiring full-time. In 2016, she attended the Minor League Baseball Umpire Training Academy in Vero Beach, Florida. Her performance at the academy led to a spot in the MiLB Advanced Course which she completed in 2017. That same year, she began her professional baseball career in the Gulf Coast League. Pawol also donated her umpire's mask to the National Baseball Hall of Fame and Museum.

During the 2023 season, she worked at the Triple-A level in both the International League and the Pacific Coast League, and was the home plate umpire during the Triple-A National Championship Game. She was the first female umpire to work at the Triple-A level in 34 years.

In 2024, Pawol became the third woman to umpire in spring training, after Pam Postema and Ria Cortesio. Pawol calls both Postema and Cortesio her mentors. She was the third base umpire during a game between the Houston Astros and the Washington Nationals. She was a crew chief in Triple-A during the 2024 baseball season. In March, it was reported that Pawol was placed on Major League Baseball's call-up list for the 2024 season, meaning that she could be called up to the majors in the event a full-time Major League umpire is not available. She was selected to work spring training again in 2025.

=== Major League Baseball ===
On August 9, 2025, Pawol made her MLB debut, becoming the first woman to umpire an MLB game during the regular season. She appeared as the first base umpire in the first game of a doubleheader between the Miami Marlins and Atlanta Braves at Truist Park in Atlanta, joining crew chief Chris Guccione at second base, Chad Whitson at third and David Rackley at home plate. She was third base umpire in the second game of the doubleheader. She continued as an umpire on Sunday, August 10, becoming the first female home plate umpire in an MLB regular-season game, in another game between the Atlanta Braves and the Miami Marlins.

Pawol donated the cap she wore while umpiring her first MLB game on August 9 to the National Baseball Hall of Fame museum.

== See also ==
- List of Major League Baseball umpires
- Women in baseball
