= Tom Hanahan =

American baseball umpire (born 1990)

MLB – No. 69
- Umpire
- Born: 1990 (age 35–36)

MLB debut
- June 9, 2023

Crew information
- Umpiring crew: C
- Crew members: #46 Ron Kulpa (crew chief); #87 Scott Barry; #79 Manny Gonzalez; #69 Tom Hanahan

Career highlights and awards
- Special assignments: Division Series (2026)

Thomas Hanahan (born 1990) is an American professional umpire in Major League Baseball. He wears uniform number 69.

== Career ==
Hanahan began his umpiring career in 2015. He made his major league debut on June 9, 2023, for a game between the Oakland Athletics and the Milwaukee Brewers at American Family Field. He was at second base, with Jeff Nelson at first, Ben May as the home plate umpire and C.B. Bucknor at third.

MLB promoted Hanahan to the permanent staff prior to the 2026 season along with Brian Walsh, upon the retirements of Mark Carlson and Phil Cuzzi.

== See also ==
- List of Major League Baseball umpires (disambiguation)
