= Bernice Gera =

American baseball umpire (1931–1992)

Bernice Shiner Gera
- Born: June 15, 1931; Ernest, Pennsylvania, U.S.
- Died: September 23, 1992 (aged 61); Pembroke Pines, Florida, U.S.
- Occupation: Baseball umpire
- Spouse: Steve Gera

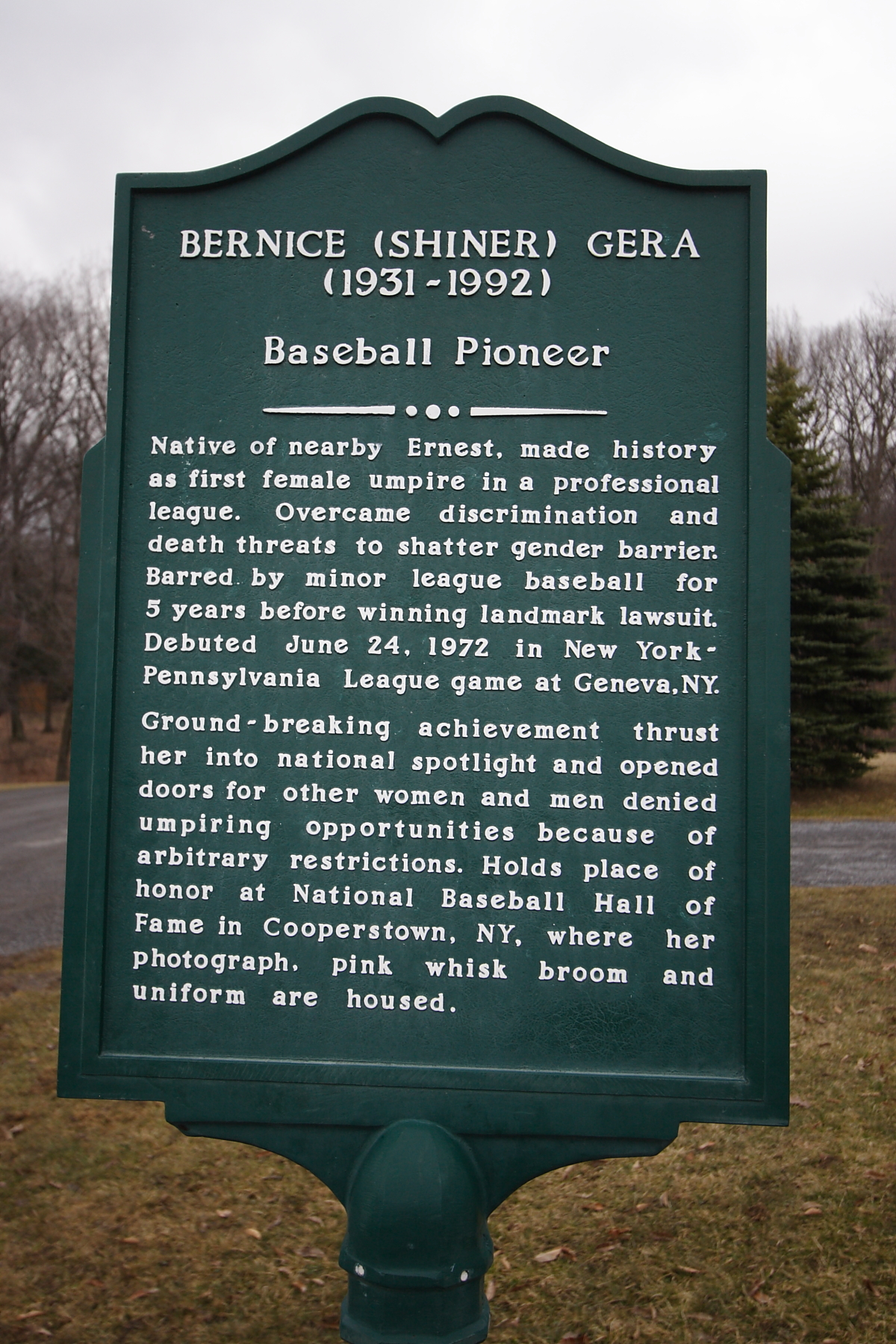
Bernice Gera historical marker near Ernest, Pennsylvania

Bernice Shiner Gera (June 15, 1931 – September 23, 1992) was an American baseball umpire. She became the first woman to umpire a professional baseball game in 1972, retiring after one game citing the resentment of other umpires.

== Life ==
Born in Ernest, Pennsylvania, as one of five children, Gera loved baseball as a child and grew up playing as an outfielder and umpiring games. She never considered a career in baseball until she was already in her mid-thirties, married, living in Jackson Heights, New York, and working as a secretary. According to a Time article, the idea to become an umpire just suddenly hit her one night and saw her work umpiring games in slums as "a form of social welfare", as having a woman on the field would lead to "less trouble" and encourage other women to attend the games. Gera sold her husband, a free-lance photographer, on the idea and enrolled in an umpiring school in 1967. She was the first woman ever to attend the Fort Lauderdale Baseball School.

As umpiring had been a strictly male profession up to that point, the school had no facilities for Gera, and she spent much of the six-week program living in a nearby motel. By several reports, she excelled in her training, yet Gera was rejected by the National Association of Professional Baseball Leagues (NAPBL), which claimed that she did not meet the physical requirements of the job. Baseball executive Ed Doherty claimed that umpires needed to be 21 to 35 years old, a minimum of 5 feet 10 inches (1.78 m) tall, and weigh at least 170 pounds (77 kg), while Gera was 38 years old, 5 ft 2 in (1.57 m), and weighed 126 pounds (57 kg). Gera even had prior experience umpiring for the National Baseball Congress in Bridgeton, New Jersey, as well as in "recreational programs in the slums", but this was not enough to get her a job. Unable to gain employment as a female umpire, on March 19, 1969, Gera filed a sex discrimination case under Title VII of the Civil Rights Act of 1964 with the New York State Human Rights Commission. In her complaint, she accused both the New York Professional Baseball League and its president, Vincent McNamara, of not employing her as an umpire due to her sex. In his rejection of Gera's application, McNamara cited single-gender dressing rooms and foul language on the field as reasons why women should not umpire games.

Undeterred, Gera fought the NAPBL in court for three years. New York representative Mario Biaggi represented Gera legally in court and, using Gera's story as inspiration, even introduced an equal rights constitutional amendment to the House of Representatives during his time in Congress. On January 13, 1972, Gera finally won a discrimination suit against the NAPBL, winning an appeal from the Court of Appeals, New York state’s highest court, in a five-to-two decision. Though she was not a member of a women's liberation group, she was a "stanch adherent of work equality" and viewed this as a huge victory. She then received a contract to work in the New York–Penn League on April 13, opening the door for her to become the first female umpire in professional baseball. On June 23, 1972, she gained national attention when she umpired the first game of a Class A minor league doubleheader between the Geneva Senators and Auburn Phillies. The game was a near sellout with 2,000 people attending the game at Shuron Park in Geneva, New York.

In the fourth inning, Gera ruled Auburn base-runner Terry Ford safe at second on a double play, then reversed her call. Auburn manager Nolan Campbell disputed the decision and said that Gera's first mistake was putting on an umpire's uniform and her second was blowing the call. Campbell was ejected from the game, but Gera still decided to resign between games, which was later said to be planned, saying she became disenchanted with umpiring when the other umpires refused to cooperate with her on the field. She was scheduled to be the home plate umpire for the second game.

Gera cites the "cool resentment" of both the other umpires and the baseball establishment as a motivation for her decision to resign, not her dispute with Auburn manager Nolan Campbell. This, combined with both verbal, written and physical "threats" "disgusted" her and contributed to her disillusionment with baseball culture. Eight men, for example, allegedly shattered the light outside Gera's motel room and cursed at her the night before she umpired her first game, perceiving her as an "attack on baseball's male fraternity". Though she resigned not long after becoming an umpire, Gera saw this as a larger, symbolic victory for women participating in sports historically perceived as "for men only."

Her husband, Steve Gera, quoted his wife as saying: "I could beat them in the courts, but I can't beat them on the field." Although she stopped umpiring, Gera stayed in the game, working for the New York Mets in the team's community relations and promotions department from 1974 to 1979 before retiring to Florida.

Gera died of kidney cancer in 1992 in Memorial Hospital West in Pembroke Pines, Florida, at the age of 61.

== National Baseball Hall of Fame and Museum ==
The National Baseball Hall of Fame and Museum contains artifacts from women associated with baseball, including Gera.

== See also ==
- Ria Cortesio
- Pam Postema
- Women in baseball
- Christine Wren
