= Lanesville Heritage Weekend =

Coordinates: 38°14′19″N 85°59′8″W

Lanesville Heritage Weekend is a festival in Lanesville, Indiana, that celebrates the history and heritage of Indiana farmers and small towns such as Lanesville. It was first held as the Lanesville Bicentennial Celebration, in honor of the United States Bicentennial. In the 21st century, the four-day festival draws an estimated 70,000 visitors each year.

== History ==
The Lanesville Heritage Weekend is traditionally held the weekend starting the second Friday in September. The festival started in 1976 with a $500 federal grant, an old-time steam engine and a dozen antique tractors on display. It expanded to a four-day festival in 2016.

The festival showcases antique farm machinery and craft skills, with demonstrations of broom making and wood-turning, weaving, and of the process of making sorghum and brooms. wood-turning and woodcarving, in addition to showcasing old-time machinery used in sawmills, threshing.

2020 saw no festival.

== Events ==
The events held at Lanesville Heritage Weekend help to celebrate the town and its history. They events include:

- a display of antique motors
- an antique tractor display
- an old saw mill demonstration
- plowing fields using old techniques such as the plow and oxen
- a show of antique farm equipment
- demonstrations of old techniques used to make foods like apple butter, sorghum, and soap
- a tractor pull
- live bluegrass music
- a parade down Main Street
- a Queen & Princess Contest
- an 8- and 2-mile run
- a 5-mile walk
- different food booths
- carnival rides
- a hot-air balloon race
- helicopter rides
