= Brian Walsh (umpire) =

American baseball umpire (born 1984)

MLB – No. 60
- Umpire
- Born: July 1984 (age 42)

MLB debut
- April 18, 2023

Crew information
- Umpiring crew: R
- Crew members: #26 Bill Miller (crew chief); #4 Chad Fairchild; #62 Chad Whitson; #60 Brian Walsh

Brian Walsh (born July 1984) is an American professional umpire in Major League Baseball. He wears uniform number 60.

== Career ==
Walsh began his umpiring career in 2015. He umpired in the Arizona League, Appalachian League, Midwest League, California League, Texas League and Pacific Coast League. He made his major league debut on April 18, 2023, for the first game of a doubleheader between the Cleveland Guardians and Detroit Tigers at Comerica Park. He was at first base, with Alex Tosi as the home plate umpire, Brian Knight at third and Todd Tichenor at third.

MLB promoted Walsh to the permanent staff prior to the 2026 season along with Tom Hanahan, upon the retirements of Mark Carlson and Phil Cuzzi.

== See also ==
- List of Major League Baseball umpires (disambiguation)
