= Christine Wren =

American baseball umpire (1949–2026)

Christine Wren (1949 – October 25, 2026) was an American professional baseball umpire. She was the second woman to umpire professionally in organized baseball, and the first woman to work for a full baseball season. Wren completed three seasons as an ump, working in the Northwest League for two years in 1975–1976, and in the Midwest League in 1977. She was hired to work an exhibition game between the Los Angeles Dodgers and the University of Southern California in 1975.

== Background ==
Wren grew up in Spokane, Washington. As a young woman, she played sandlot baseball, and later fast pitch softball, often playing catcher. After making the decision to pursue umpiring, she attended the Bill Kinnamon Specialized Umpire course in California, one of the country's leading umpire schools. She was then invited by Peter O'Malley, owner of the Los Angeles Dodgers, to officiate an exhibition game between the Dodgers and the University of Southern California.

In 1975, Wren was hired to umpire in the Class A Northwest League. She officiated for two seasons in that league, from 1975 to 1976. In 1977, she was assigned to the Class A Midwest League; during the season, she was invited by the league President, Bill Walters, to umpire the Midwest League all-star game. After three seasons, she left umpiring to pursue other employment.

She later worked as a delivery driver for UPS in Seattle and was a staff computer specialist for the Renton School District. Wren died in Spokane on October 25, 2026, at the age of 78.

== Legacy ==
While Bernice Gera was the first woman to officiate a professional baseball game, she worked only one game in 1972 after winning a court case to break into the sport. As only the second woman umpire, Wren faced some doubt and skepticism that a woman could handle the pressure of officiating. By working three full seasons, she achieved several firsts, and helped to pave the way for other female umpires who followed, including Pam Postema and Ria Cortesio.

Wren was the first woman to work home plate in a game, calling balls and strikes. In addition, she was the first woman to umpire a major league exhibition game, and the first to umpire a minor league all star game. The National Baseball Hall of Fame and Museum holds her chest protector in their collection, along with some scrapbooks from her officiating days.

== See also ==
- Women in baseball
