= Lucas Alcaraz =

Spanish footballer (born 1966)

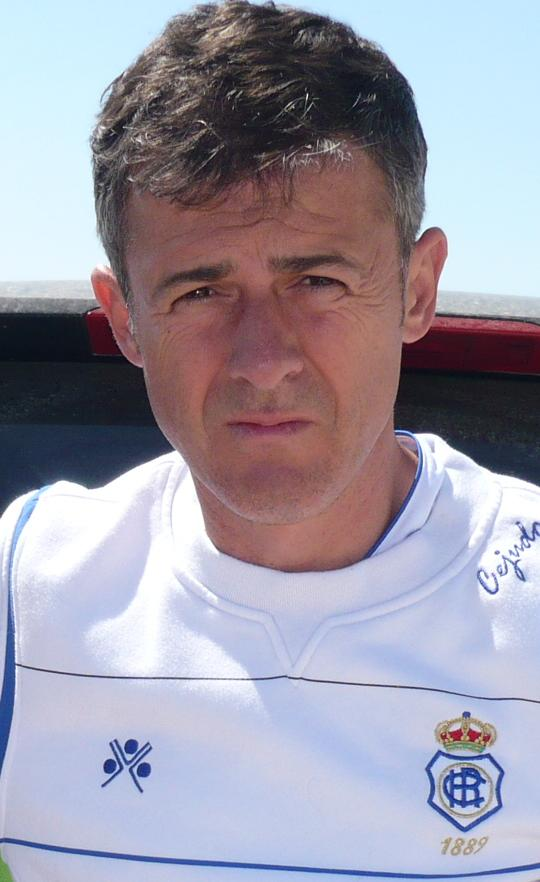
- Alcaraz as Recreativo manager in 2009

Personal information
- Full name: Luis Lucas Alcaraz González
- Date of birth: 21 June 1966 (age 60)
- Place of birth: Granada, Spain

Youth career
- Jaén

Senior career*
Years	Team	Apps	(Gls)
- Granada

Managerial career
- 1994–1995: Adra
- 1995–1998: Granada
- 1998: Almería
- 1999–2000: Dos Hermanas
- 2000–2003: Recreativo
- 2003–2005: Racing Santander
- 2005–2006: Xerez
- 2006–2008: Murcia
- 2008–2009: Recreativo
- 2009–2011: Córdoba
- 2011–2012: Almería
- 2012–2013: Aris
- 2013–2014: Granada
- 2014–2015: Levante
- 2016–2017: Granada
- 2017: Algeria
- 2017–2018: Almería
- 2018: Zaragoza
- 2020: Albacete
- 2021–2022: Olympiakos Nicosia
- 2022–2023: Ibiza
- 2023–2024: Nassaji Mazandaran
- * Club domestic league appearances and goals

Luis Lucas Alcaraz González (born 21 June 1966) is a Spanish football manager.

In a managerial career of over two decades, he competed in ten La Liga seasons at the helm of Recreativo (with whom he reached the 2003 Copa del Rey final), Racing de Santander, Granada and Levante. He was also in charge of eight clubs in the Segunda División, winning promotion with Recreativo and Murcia, and had a brief spell in international selection with Algeria.

== Career ==
Born in Granada, Andalusia, Alcaraz started coaching with AD Adra in 1994 at the age of 28, and subsequently achieved two top-four finishes in the Segunda División B in his three-year spell at Granada CF, but failing to promote in the playoffs. In the following two seasons he managed in the same tier and region, with Almería CF and Dos Hermanas CF, suffering relegation with the former.

In June 2000, the 34-year-old Alcaraz signed for Recreativo de Huelva, helping the oldest club in Spain return to La Liga after an absence of 23 years in 2002 behind champions Atlético Madrid and Racing de Santander. Even though Recre returned to the second division immediately, they also managed to reach the final of the Copa del Rey, losing 3–0 to RCD Mallorca.

Alcaraz then moved to Racing Santander, being sacked midway through the 2004–05 campaign due to bad results. He spent the following two seasons in the Segunda División, helping Real Murcia CF to promote in 2007 but being immediately relegated afterwards – he was fired on 6 March 2008 – and meeting the same fate with his following club, Recreativo.

In the summer of 2009, Alcaraz signed with another team in his native Andalusia, Córdoba CF (division two), helping the side finish tenth in his first season. In late June 2011, he re-joined Almería – now called Unión Deportiva – recently relegated from the top flight.

On 3 April 2012, after only four points in six games and no wins, Alcaraz was relieved of his duties. On 30 January of the following year, after a very short spell in Greece with Aris Thessaloniki FC, he returned to his country and Granada, with the club now in the top tier.

Alcaraz was appointed at Levante UD on 21 October 2014, replacing fired José Luis Mendilibar after just eight rounds. One year and four days later, following a 0–4 home defeat to Real Sociedad, he was sacked.

On 11 June 2016, Alcaraz was announced as the new Elche CF manager, only to refuse the job six days later. On 3 October, he began his third spell at Granada.

As the team stood second-bottom in the table, Alcaraz was relieved of his duties on 10 April 2017. Three days later, he was appointed at the helm of the Algeria national side, but was fired in October after failing to qualify for the 2018 FIFA World Cup, receiving a €345,000 payout.

Alcaraz returned to Almería on 16 November 2017, replacing Luis Miguel Ramis. He resigned on 24 April 2018, after an eight-match winless run.

On 22 October 2018, Alcaraz was appointed Real Zaragoza manager in place of the sacked Imanol Idiakez. On 17 December, he was himself dismissed.

Alcaraz was named manager of Albacete Balompié on 3 February 2020, still in the second division, He was relieved of his duties on 13 October, just five matches into the new season.

On 29 December 2021, Alcaraz moved to Cyprus with Olympiakos Nicosia, but left after collecting no wins in eight games. In November 2022, he became UD Ibiza's third manager of the second-tier campaign.

On 6 June 2023, after the relegation of the Balearic Islands side, Alcaraz left. On 24 December, he signed for F.C. Nassaji Mazandaran in the Persian Gulf Pro League, leaving his post the following February.

== Personal life ==
Alcaraz's father, Felipe, was a politician and a writer, being a longtime secretary-general of the Communist Party of Andalusia. His grandfather was Manuel González, and his namesake his uncle.

== Managerial statistics ==
As of match played 21 February 2024

Managerial record by team and tenure
Team	Nat	From	To	Record								Ref
Team	Nat	From	To	G	W	D	L	GF	GA	GD	Win %	Ref
Adra	(Spain)	3 May 1994	23 May 1995	40	16	6	18	44	46	−2	40.00	
Granada	(Spain)	16 October 1995	22 February 1998	106	44	35	27	134	92	+42	41.51	
Almería	(Spain)	22 May 1998	8 November 1998	11	2	5	4	8	9	−1	18.18	
Dos Hermanas	(Spain)	2 July 1999	16 May 2000	39	14	17	8	41	33	+8	35.90	
Recreativo	(Spain)	10 June 2000	30 June 2003	134	47	51	36	138	133	+5	35.07	
Racing Santander	(Spain)	31 July 2003	9 February 2005	64	18	17	29	73	100	−27	28.13	
Xerez	(Spain)	26 June 2005	18 June 2006	46	20	15	11	70	53	+17	43.48	
Murcia	(Spain)	20 June 2006	6 March 2008	71	26	22	23	85	88	−3	36.62	
Recreativo	(Spain)	7 October 2008	15 June 2009	34	8	8	18	34	49	−15	23.53	
Córdoba	(Spain)	25 June 2009	8 June 2011	92	31	27	34	108	119	−11	33.70	
Almería	(Spain)	26 June 2011	4 April 2012	35	15	14	6	57	41	+16	42.86	
Aris	(Greece)	3 December 2012	29 January 2013	8	2	4	2	9	11	−2	25.00	
Granada	(Spain)	30 January 2013	19 May 2014	57	19	9	29	57	83	−26	33.33	
Levante	(Spain)	21 October 2014	25 October 2015	43	10	13	20	40	71	−31	23.26	
Granada	(Spain)	3 October 2016	10 April 2017	26	5	6	15	21	51	−30	19.23	
Algeria	(Algeria)	13 April 2017	11 October 2017	7	2	1	4	6	10	−4	28.57	
Almería	(Spain)	16 November 2017	24 April 2018	21	6	6	9	22	25	−3	28.57	
Zaragoza	(Spain)	22 October 2018	17 December 2018	8	1	2	5	6	13	−7	12.50	
Albacete	(Spain)	3 February 2020	13 October 2020	21	5	10	6	19	22	−3	23.81	
Olympiakos Nicosia	(Cyprus)	29 December 2021	16 February 2022	8	0	2	6	4	14	−10	0.00	
Ibiza	(Spain)	28 November 2022	6 June 2023	26	4	10	12	24	44	−20	15.38	
Nassaji Mazandaran	(Iran)	24 December 2023	25 February 2024	4	0	1	3	1	6	−5	0.00	
Total				901	295	281	325	1,001	1,113	−112	32.74	—
