= Chad Fairchild =

American baseball umpire (born 1970)

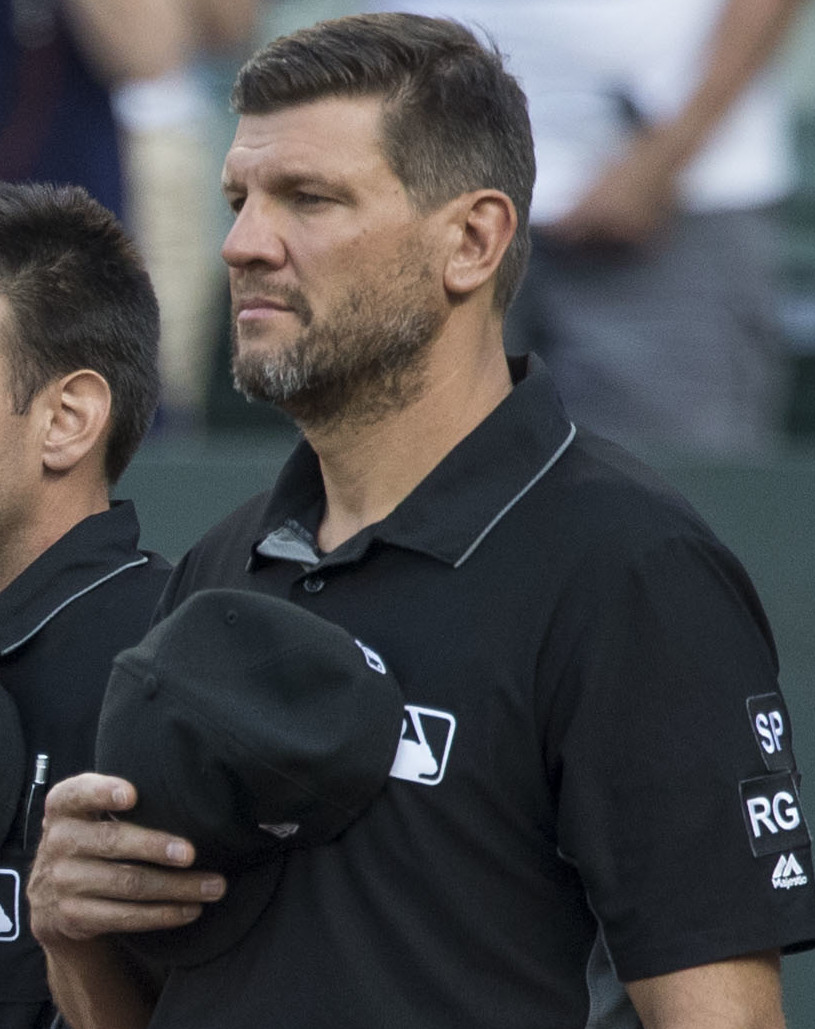
- Fairchild in 2017

MLB – No. 4
- Umpire
- Born: December 30, 1970 (age 55); Sandusky, Ohio, U.S.

MLB debut
- September 30, 2004

Crew information
- Umpiring crew: R
- Crew members: #26 Bill Miller (crew chief); #4 Chad Fairchild; #62 Chad Whitson; #60 Brian Walsh

Career highlights and awards
- Special assignments: World Series (2018, 2024); League Championship Series (2017, 2019, 2025, 2026); Division Series (2011, 2012, 2015, 2016, 2018, 2021, 2022, 2024); Wild Card Games/Series (2019, 2026); All-Star Games (2013); World Baseball Classic (2006, 2026)

Chadwick Jarrett Fairchild (born December 30, 1970) is an American umpire in Major League Baseball. He wore number 75 until the 2014 season, when he changed to number 4 (formerly worn by Tim Tschida).

== Career ==
Fairchild has worked in both major leagues since umpiring his first game on September 30, 2004. He has umpired professionally since 1997, having worked in the Gulf Coast League, New York–Penn League, South Atlantic League, Florida State League, Southern League and International League before reaching the majors. He also officiated in the 2006 World Baseball Classic.

Fairchild has worked in one All-Star Game (2013), eight Division Series (2011, 2012, 2015, 2016, 2018, 2021, 2022, 2024), four Championship Series (2017, 2019, 2025, 2026), and two World Series (2018, 2024)

Fairchild was listed by The Hardball Times as having one of the smallest strike zones in the 2011 season.

== Personal life ==
Fairchild is a native of Wakeman, Ohio. Fairchild lives in Florida, and has one son.

== See also ==
- List of Major League Baseball umpires (disambiguation)
