= Lanesville, Indiana =

- Town
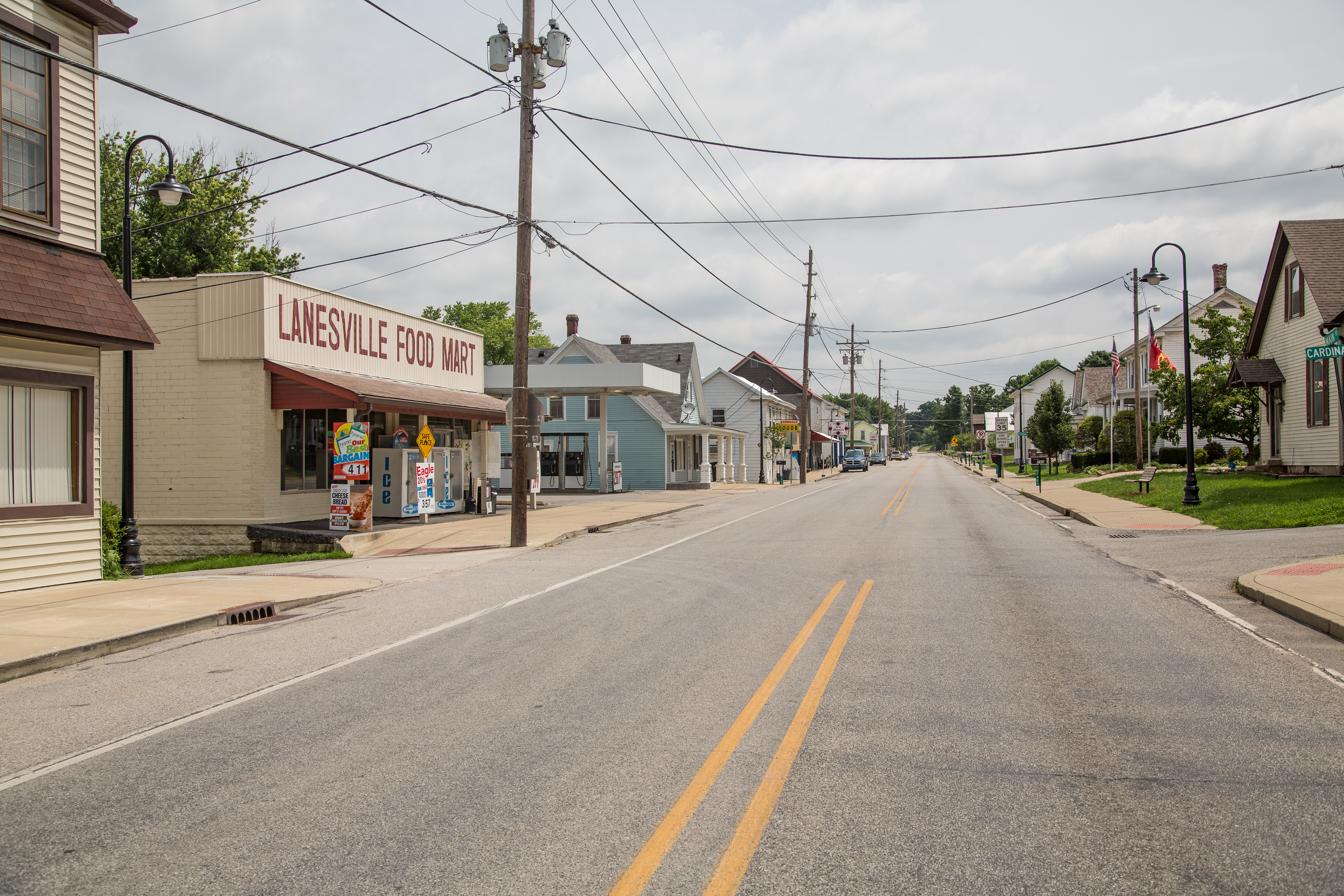

- Location of Lanesville in Harrison County, Indiana.
- Coordinates: 38°14′19″N 85°59′8″W
- Country: United States
- State: Indiana
- County: Harrison
- Township: Franklin

Area
  - Total: 0.94 sq mi (2.44 km^{2})
  - Land: 0.94 sq mi (2.44 km^{2})
  - Water: 0 sq mi (0.00 km^{2})
- Elevation: 702 ft (214 m)

Population (2020)
  - Total: 935
  - Density: 1,168.09/sq mi (451.00/km^{2})
- Time zone: UTC-5 (Eastern (EST))
  - Summer (DST): UTC-4 (EDT)
- ZIP code: 47136
- Area code: 812
- FIPS code: 18-42048
- GNIS feature ID: 437616
- Website: townoflanesville.in.gov

Lanesville is a town in Franklin Township, Harrison County, Indiana, United States. The population was 1098 at the 2020 census.

== History ==
The first permanent settlement was made at Lanesville about 1800. Lanesville was platted in 1817, and named for one Mr. Lane, the government official who surveyed the town site.

The Lanesville post office was established in 1832.

== Geography ==
According to the 2010 census, Lanesville has a total area of 0.52 square miles (1.35 km^{2}), all land.

== Demographics ==
Historical population
Census	Pop.	Note	%±
1870	157		—
1880	280		78.3%
1890	277		−1.1%
1900	324		17.0%
1910	290		−10.5%
1920	269		−7.2%
1930	273		1.5%
1940	267		−2.2%
1950	314		17.6%
1960	346		10.2%
1970	586		69.4%
1980	570		−2.7%
1990	512		−10.2%
2000	614		19.9%
2010	564		−8.1%
2020	1,098		94.7%
U.S. Decennial Census

=== 2010 census ===
As of the census of 2010, there were 564 people, 241 households, and 157 families living in the town. The population density was 1,084.6 inhabitants per square mile (418.8/km^{2}). There were 280 housing units at an average density of 538.5 per square mile (207.9/km^{2}). The racial makeup of the town was 98.2% White, 0.4% African American, 0.2% Asian, 0.7% from other races, and 0.5% from two or more races. Hispanic or Latino of any race were 0.9% of the population.

There were 241 households, of which 33.6% had children under the age of 18 living with them, 46.5% were married couples living together, 13.3% had a female householder with no husband present, 5.4% had a male householder with no wife present, and 34.9% were non-families. 29.9% of all households were made up of individuals, and 13.7% had someone living alone who was 65 years of age or older. The average household size was 2.34 and the average family size was 2.87.

The median age in the town was 40.9 years. 24.6% of residents were under the age of 18; 6% were between the ages of 18 and 24; 24.8% were from 25 to 44; 27.9% were from 45 to 64; and 16.7% were 65 years of age or older. The gender makeup of the town was 48.4% male and 51.6% female.

=== 2000 census ===
As of the census of 2000, there were 614 people, 249 households, and 184 families living in the town. The population density was 1,527.5 inhabitants per square mile (589.8/km^{2}). There were 259 housing units at an average density of 644.3 per square mile (248.8/km^{2}). The racial makeup of the town was 94.53% White, 0.49% Asian, and 0.98% from two or more races. Hispanic or Latino of any race were 0.49% of the population.

There were 249 households, out of which 34.1% had children under the age of 18 living with them, 53.0% were married couples living together, 12.9% had a female householder with no husband present, and 30.1% were non-families. 25.7% of all households were made up of individuals, and 7.2% had someone living alone who was 65 years of age or older. The average household size was 2.47 and the average family size was 2.98.

In the town, the population was spread out, with 26.1% under the age of 18, 9.8% from 18 to 24, 27.4% from 25 to 42, 25.2% from 45 to 64, and 11.6% who were 65 years of age or older. The median age was 36 years. For every 100 females, there were 86.6 males. For every 100 females age 18 and over, there were 89.2 males.

The median income for a household in the town was $54,219, and the median income for a family was $57,031. Males had a median income of $36,875 versus $23,214 for females. The per capita income for the town was $18,914. About 2.6% of families and 2.1% of the population were below the poverty line, including 0.5% of those under age 18 and 3.6% of those age 65 or over.

== Education ==
- Lanesville Junior Senior High School
- Lanesville Elementary School
- St. John Lutheran School

Lanesville has a public library, a branch of the Harrison County Public Library.

== Culture ==
The town has a popular yearly festival called the Lanesville Heritage Weekend.

== Notable people ==
- Walter Q. Gresham - Postmaster General, Court of Appeals judge, two-time candidate for Republican presidential nomination, Secretary of State, and Secretary of the Treasury.
- Charlie Reising - Major League Baseball outfielder for the 1884 Indianapolis Hoosiers.
- Steve Stemle - Major League Baseball pitcher.
