= Pam Postema =

American baseball umpire (born 1954)

- Born: April 1954 (age 72); Willard, Ohio, U.S.
- Occupation: Baseball umpire
- Years active: 1977–1989

Pamela Postema (born April 1954) is an American former baseball umpire. In 1988 she became the first female baseball umpire to officiate a Major League Baseball spring training game. For her unique contributions to the game, she was inducted into the Baseball Reliquary's Shrine of the Eternals in 2000.

== Education ==
After high school, Postema spent a year working in a rubber factory in Willard, Ohio before moving with her sister to Florida where she planned to enroll in the University of Florida. While in Florida, she saw a newspaper ad for Al Somers Umpire School in Daytona Beach. Postema first applied to the Al Somers Umpire School in Florida (now the Harry Wendelstedt Umpire School) in 1976. She submitted three applications before finally being enrolled. Her class was originally 130 but by the end of the season, 30 had quit or been asked to leave. Postema, despite graduating seventeenth in her class, struggled to find a job for three months post-graduation.

== Early career ==
In 1977, Postema received an offer for a job in the rookie Gulf Coast League. She spent two years there, after which she had two-year stints in both Class A and Double-A, becoming the first woman to umpire at those levels, before being promoted to Triple-A baseball in the Pacific Coast League. During her six years at the Triple-A level, Postema was looked highly upon by many players, although other players objected to the notion of a female umpire.

Postema was involved in an unusual incident during a May 30, 1984, game between the Portland Beavers and Vancouver Canadians. Beavers manager Lee Elia was ejected for arguing a called third strike, and subsequently threw a chair onto the field before leaving the dugout. Postema then directed the team's batboy to retrieve the chair from the field. Acting on instructions from Beavers players in the dugout, he refused, resulting in Postema ejecting the batboy.

== MLB career ==
Although often considered a prospect for major league umpiring, Pam Postema never received the call until in 1988, when Baseball Commissioner Bart Giamatti offered her a contract to officiate at the MLB level during spring training. In 1987, Giamatti also offered her a chance to umpire at the "Hall of Fame Game" between the New York Yankees and the Atlanta Braves. Both opportunities looked promising, and she hoped to gain a contract into the major league. Unfortunately, Giamatti died soon thereafter, and Postema never again got the chance to umpire in the major leagues. In 1989, the Triple-A Alliance cancelled Postema's contract after 13 years of well-regarded experience in the minor leagues. She then filed a sex-discrimination lawsuit at the federal level. She stated, "I believe I belong in the major leagues. If it weren't for the fact that I'm a woman, I would be there right now."

== After baseball ==
In 1992, Postema published a book entitled You've Gotta Have Balls to Make It In This League. Following her umpiring career, she worked as a trucker, a factory worker, and later a welder, but quit in order to take care of her father, who was afflicted with Alzheimer's disease. On March 29, 2007, Ria Cortesio became the second female umpire to work a Major League spring training game. On August 9, 2025, Jen Pawol became the first female umpire in Major League Baseball history.

== National Baseball Hall of Fame and Museum ==
The National Baseball Hall of Fame and Museum contains artifacts from women associated with baseball, including Postema.

== See also ==
- Ria Cortesio
- Bernice Gera
- Jen Pawol
- Women in baseball
- Christine Wren
