= Manny González =

Manny González may refer to:

- Manny Gonzalez (umpire)
- Manny González (soccer)

== See also ==
- Manuel González (disambiguation)
