= Manuel González (footballer, born 1917) =

Spanish footballer

Personal information
- Full name: José Manuel González López
- Date of birth: 10 October 1917
- Place of birth: Madrid, Spain
- Date of death: 24 July 1988 (aged 70)
- Position: Defender

Senior career*
Years	Team	Apps	(Gls)
1941–1948	Granada	139	(2)
1948–1951	Málaga	82	(0)
1952	Real Madrid	1	(0)
1952–1956	Granada	100	(0)
Total		322	(2)

Managerial career
- 1959: Granada
- * Club domestic league appearances and goals

José Manuel González López (10 October 1917 – 24 July 1988) was a Spanish professional footballer who played as a defender.

== Career ==
González started his career in Granada's squad in 1941. He made his professional debut on 28 September during a 1–1 draw at Los Cármenes with Celta. That was the first of thirteen appearances in his opening campaign, prior to eighty-two across the following three; the last finishing with relegation to the Segunda División. In that time, González scored for the first time in a 5–2 win versus Celta in April 1944. He stayed with Granada for three seasons in tier two, before departing in 1948 to play for Segunda División team Málaga. Twenty-eight appearances followed in season one as they won promotion to La Liga for 1949–50.

He subsequently featured fifty-six times in two La Liga campaigns. In 1952, González secured a move to Real Madrid. However, he made just one appearance for the club - on 17 February versus Real Sociedad. He soon left to rejoin Granada. He retired four seasons later, following one hundred matches in the Segunda División. In 1959, he was made manager of Granada. He left after two matches.

== Personal life ==
González's son and namesake Manuel González was also a professional footballer. His grandson, Lucas Alcaraz, became a football manager in 1995.

== Career statistics ==
=== Club ===
Club statistics
Club	Season	League			Cup (Note: Includes the Copa del Rey)		League Cup		Continental		Other		Total	
Club	Season	Division	Apps	Goals	Apps	Goals	Apps	Goals	Apps	Goals	Apps	Goals	Apps	Goals
Granada	1941–42	La Liga	13	0	0	0	—		—		0	0	13	0
Granada	1942–43	La Liga	18	0	0	0	—		—		0	0	18	0
Granada	1943–44	La Liga	26	1	5	0	—		—		0	0	31	1
Granada	1944–45	La Liga	24	0	8	0	—		—		1 (Note: One appearance in 1944–45 La Liga play-offs)	0	33	0
Granada	1945–46	Segunda División	23	1	4	0	—		—		0	0	27	1
Granada	1946–47	Segunda División	25	0	2	0	—		—		0	0	27	0
Granada	1947–48	Segunda División	10	0	2	0	—		—		0	0	12	0
Granada	Total		139	2	21	0	—		—		1	0	161	2
Málaga	1948–49	Segunda División	26	0	2	0	—		—		0	0	28	0
Málaga	1949–50	La Liga	26	0	3	0	—		—		0	0	29	0
Málaga	1950–51	La Liga	30	0	0	0	—		—		7 (Note: Seven appearances in 1950–51 La Liga play-offs)	0	37	0
Málaga	Total		82	0	5	0	—		—		7	0	94	0
Real Madrid	1951–52	La Liga	1	0	0	0	—		—		0	0	1	0
Granada	1952–53	Segunda División	28	0	8	0	—		—		0	0	36	0
Granada	1953–54	Segunda División	27	0	0	0	—		—		0	0	27	0
Granada	1954–55	Segunda División	23	0	0	0	—		—		4 (Note: Four appearances in 1954–55 Segunda División play-offs)	0	27	0
Granada	1955–56	Segunda División	22	0	0	0	—		—		0	0	22	0
Granada	Total		100	0	8	0	—		—		4	0	112	0
Career total			322	2	34	0	—		—		12	0	368	2

=== Managerial record ===
Managerial record by team and tenure
Team	From	To	Record					Ref
Team	From	To	P	W	D	L	Win %	Ref
Granada	8 February 1959	15 February 1959	2	1	0	1	50.0	
Total			2	1	0	1	50.0	—
