= Marcus Pattillo =

American baseball umpire (born 1977)

Marcus Pattillo (born September 29, 1977, in Kennett, MO) is an American former Major League Baseball (MLB) umpire, who worked as a fill-in during the 2014 and 2015 MLB seasons. He wore number 18.

As of 2015, Patillo's regular duties involve umpiring in the Triple-A Pacific Coast League. He was the home plate umpire in a semifinal game of WBSC Premier12 (2015). There are opinions that he showed controversial ball-strike calls likely to help the host country win the game; however, the Japan team's bullpen blew their lead in the 9th inning, losing the game.

== See also ==
- List of Major League Baseball umpires (disambiguation)
