= Charlie Reising =

American baseball player (1861–1915)

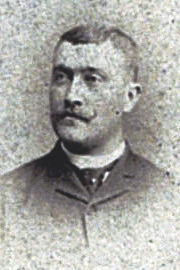
- Outfielder
- Born: August 28, 1861; Lanesville, Indiana, U.S.
- Died: July 26, 1915 (aged 53); Louisville, Kentucky, U.S.
- Batted: Unknown Threw: Unknown

MLB debut
- July 19, 1884, for the Indianapolis Hoosiers

Last MLB appearance
- July 20, 1884, for the Indianapolis Hoosiers

MLB statistics
- Batting average: .000
- Home runs: 0
- Runs batted in: 0
- Stats at Baseball Reference

Teams
- Indianapolis Hoosiers (1884)

Charles Reising (August 28, 1861 – July 26, 1915), nicknamed "Pop", was an American Major League Baseball outfielder for the 1884 Indianapolis Hoosiers. He appeared in two games for the Hoosiers and was hitless in eight at-bats.
