= Manuel González (footballer, born 1943) =

Spanish footballer

Personal information
- Full name: José Manuel González López
- Date of birth: 26 May 1943 (age 83)
- Place of birth: Granada, Spain
- Height: 1.73 m (5 ft 8 in)
- Position: Defender

Youth career
- Real Madrid

Senior career*
Years	Team	Apps	(Gls)
1964–1966	Granada	33	(0)
1966–1977	Real Zaragoza	313	(2)
1977	Granada	0	(0)
Total		346	(2)
- * Club domestic league appearances and goals

José Manuel González López (born 26 May 1943) is a Spanish former professional footballer who played as a defender.

== Career ==
He spent the first two years of his senior career with Segunda División side Granada, making forty appearances in that period; including his debut against Hércules in November 1964. Granada were promoted in his final campaign, finishing 2nd in 1965–66. Prior to the 1966–67 La Liga season, González joined fellow top-flight team Real Zaragoza. Like with Granada, his first appearance for Zaragoza came versus Hércules; with his new side winning 2–0. He featured one hundred and sixty-six times in his opening five seasons with the club, with the latter campaign ending with relegation to the 1971–72 Segunda División.

In that season, Zaragoza won instant promotion back to La Liga with González participating in twenty-seven fixtures whilst also netting his first senior goal; during a home victory over Tenerife. He remained with Zaragoza for a further five seasons, taking his overall appearance tally to three hundred and seventy-four across eleven years. He departed in 1977, joining former club Granada but failed to make an appearance before retiring.

== Personal life ==
González's father and namesake Manuel González was also a professional footballer. Lucas Alcaraz is a nephew, he became a football manager in 1995.

== Career statistics ==
Club statistics
Club	Season	League			Cup (Note: Includes the Copa del Rey)		League Cup		Continental (Note: Includes the UEFA Cup and European Cup Winners' Cup)		Other		Total	
Club	Season	Division	Apps	Goals	Apps	Goals	Apps	Goals	Apps	Goals	Apps	Goals	Apps	Goals
Granada	1964–65	Segunda División	14	0	3	0	—		—		0	0	17	0
Granada	1965–66	Segunda División	19	0	2	0	—		—		2 (Note: Two appearances in 1965–66 Segunda División play-offs)	0	23	0
Granada	Total		33	0	5	0	—		—		2	0	40	0
Real Zaragoza	1966–67	La Liga	25	0	3	0	—		4 (Note: Four appearances in 1966–67 European Cup Winners' Cup)	0	0	0	32	0
Real Zaragoza	1967–68	La Liga	30	0	6	0	—		—		4 (Note: Four appearances in 1967–68 Inter-Cities Fairs Cup)	0	40	0
Real Zaragoza	1968–69	La Liga	30	0	2	0	—		—		6 (Note: Six appearances in 1968–69 Inter-Cities Fairs Cup)	0	38	0
Real Zaragoza	1969–70	La Liga	27	0	8	0	—		—		0	0	35	0
Real Zaragoza	1970–71	La Liga	19	0	2	0	—		—		0	0	21	0
Real Zaragoza	1971–72	Segunda División	25	1	2	0	—		—		0	0	27	1
Real Zaragoza	1972–73	La Liga	34	1	2	0	—		—		0	0	36	1
Real Zaragoza	1973–74	La Liga	29	0	3	1	—		—		0	0	32	1
Real Zaragoza	1974–75	La Liga	26	0	6	0	—		2 (Note: Two appearances in 1974–75 UEFA Cup)	0	0	0	34	0
Real Zaragoza	1975–76	La Liga	34	0	9	0	—		2 (Note: Two appearances in 1975–76 UEFA Cup)	0	0	0	45	0
Real Zaragoza	1976–77	La Liga	34	0	0	0	—		—		0	0	34	0
Real Zaragoza	Total		313	2	43	1	—		8	0	10	0	374	3
Granada	1977–78	Segunda División	0	0	0	0	—		—		0	0	0	0
Career total			346	2	48	1	—		8	0	10	0	412	3
