= Bill Miller (umpire) =

American baseball umpire (born 1967)

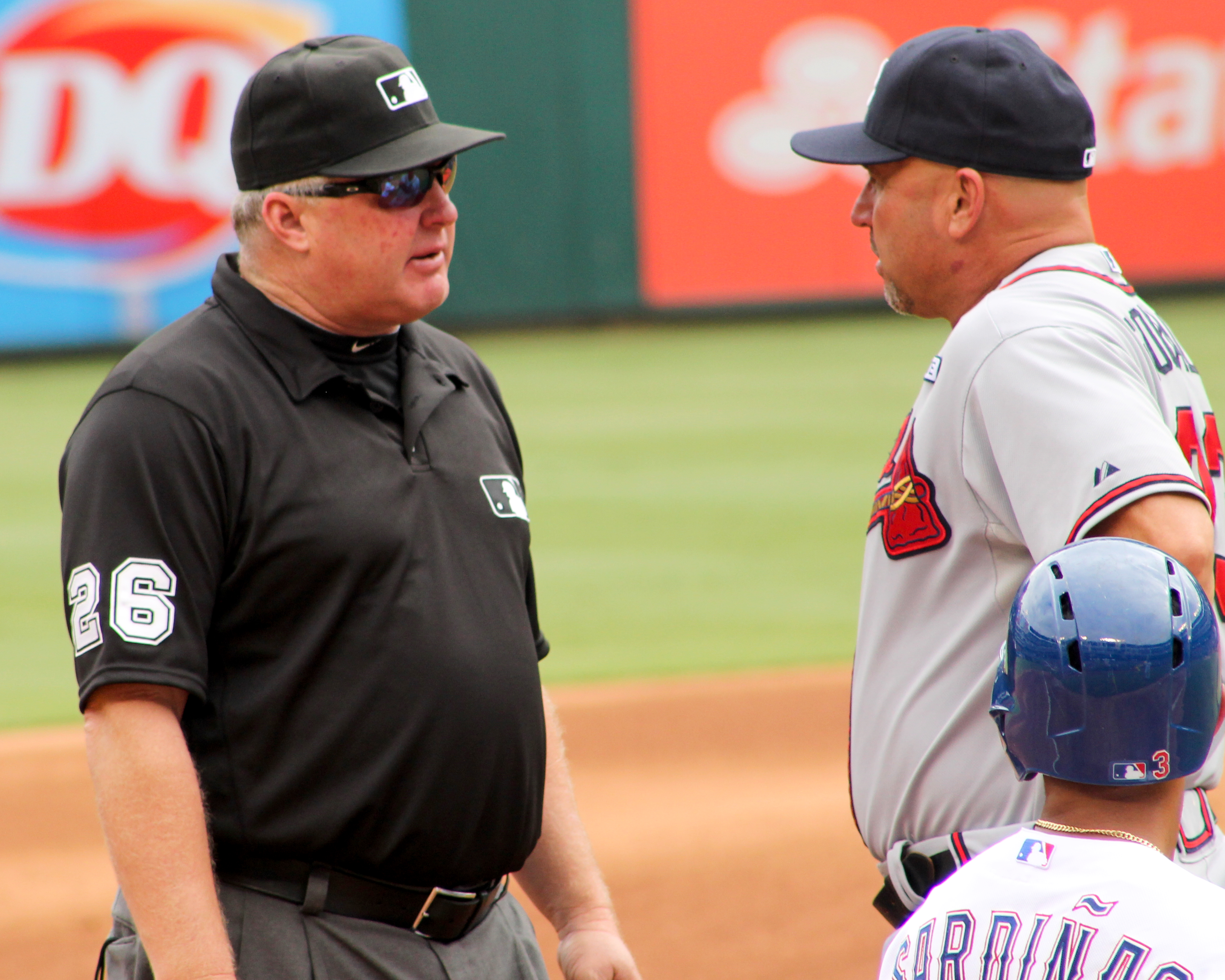
- Miller (left) discusses a call during a 2014 game with Atlanta Braves manager Fredi Gonzalez

MLB – No. 26
- Umpire
- Born: May 31, 1967 (age 59); Vallejo, California, U.S.

MLB debut
- July 28, 1997

Crew information
- Umpiring crew: R
- Crew members: #26 Bill Miller (crew chief); #4 Chad Fairchild; #62 Chad Whitson; #60 Brian Walsh

Career highlights and awards
- Special assignments: World Series (2010, 2013, 2017, 2020, 2023); League Championship Series (2009, 2011, 2012, 2014, 2015, 2018, 2019, 2021, 2024, 2026); Division Series (2002, 2003, 2005, 2008, 2010, 2013, 2016, 2017, 2020, 2022, 2023); Wild Card Games/Series (2012, 2014, 2015, 2018, 2019, 2020, 2024, 2026); All-Star Games (2007, 2022); World Baseball Classic (2009, 2013, 2023, 2026)

William Scott Miller (born May 31, 1967) is an American Major League Baseball umpire who began his career in the American League in 1997. Miller wears number 26. He has been a crew chief since the 2014 season.

== Early life ==
Miller graduated from UCLA with a history degree in 1989. He umpired in the Northwest League, Arizona Instructional League, South Atlantic League, California League, Texas League, International League, and Pacific Coast League before reaching MLB in 1997. While umpiring in the International League, Miller was robbed at gunpoint at a hotel.

== MLB career ==
Miller has officiated in eight Wild Card Games (2012, 2014, 2015, 2018, 2019, 2020, 2024, 2026), eleven Division Series (2002, 2003, 2005, 2008, 2010, 2013, 2016, 2017, 2020, 2022, 2023, ten League Championship Series (2009, 2011, 2012, 2014, 2015, 2018, 2019, 2021, 2024, 2026), and five World Series (2010, 2013, 2017, 2020, 2023). He also officiated the 2007 and 2022 All-Star Games and twice in the World Baseball Classic (2009, 2013).

On May 15, 2012, Miller was involved in an altercation with Toronto Blue Jays third baseman Brett Lawrie during his last at-bat. With a 3–1 count, pitcher Fernando Rodney threw two balls, based on replays and computerized strike zone analysis. Lawrie headed toward first after each pitch, but Miller called the pitches strikes and ejected Lawrie after he protested the strikeout. Lawrie then threw his helmet, which bounced off the ground and hit Miller. Miller also ejected Blue Jays manager John Farrell. Blue Jays would end up losing the game. After the game was over, Miller was hit by a cup of beer thrown by a fan as he was walking back to the umpires locker room. It's not known if the fan was punished. The next day, Major League Baseball suspended Lawrie for four games.

Miller was chosen as one of the umpires for the one-game Wild Card playoff between the Baltimore Orioles and the Texas Rangers on October 5, 2012.

Before the 2014 season, he was named a crew chief by Major League Baseball.

Miller was the home plate umpire for Miami Marlins pitcher Edinson Vólquez's no-hitter against the Arizona Diamondbacks on June 3, 2017. In 2019, he was named President of the Major League Baseball Umpires Association, succeeding Joe West.

== Personal life ==
Miller graduated from University of California, Los Angeles in 1989, and resides in Incline Village, Nevada. He was a three-sport athlete at Harbor High School in Santa Cruz, California, and was Athlete of the Year in Santa Cruz County his senior year. He is an alumnus of the Sigma Chi fraternity.

== See also ==
- List of Major League Baseball umpires (disambiguation)
