= Manuel González Méndez =

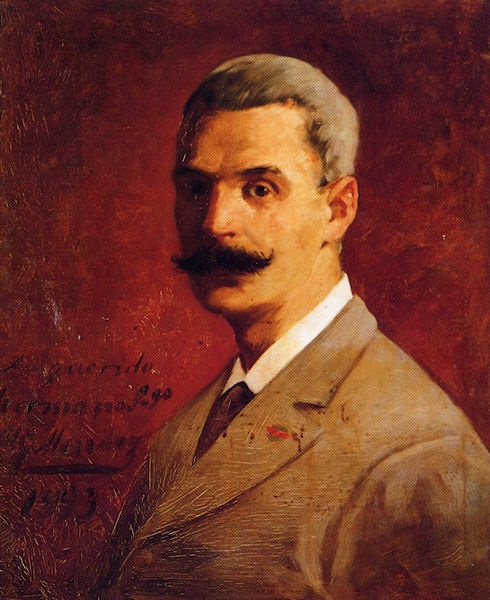
Self-portrait (1893)

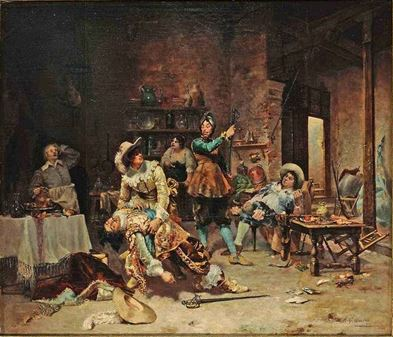
The Duel

Manuel González Méndez (3 February 1843, Santa Cruz de La Palma - 9 September 1909, Barcelona) was a Spanish painter, musician, sculptor and art professor.

== Biography ==
He began his studies at the Lancasterian School in his hometown, where a generation of Canarian artists and intellectuals would receive their educations. He also attended a drawing school and participated in a choir in the nearby parish of El Salvador. later, he moved to Tenerife; settling initially in La Orotava, then San Cristóbal de La Laguna, where he obtained his bachelor's degree and continued to study music.

From 1866 to 1867, he attended classes at the "Academia Provincial de Bellas Artes" in Santa Cruz de Tenerife; studying landscape and watercolor painting. In 1870, after several trips to Italy, he enrolled at the École Nationale Supérieure des Arts Décoratifs in Paris, where his primary instructor was the sculptor Aimé Millet. Two years later, he won an award there for a bas-relief on an Oriental theme. One of his other instructors there was the painter and sculptor, Jean-Léon Gérôme. During the Franco-Prussian War, he sold painted fans, with themes based on 17th-century Dutch paintings.

He received numerous awards throughout his career; including the Order of Isabella the Catholic (1889) and, in 1898, he was named a Knight in the Legion of Honor. In 1904, the Ayuntamiento de Santa Cruz de Tenerife granted him the chair of "Modelling and Decorative Composition" at the Municipal Drawing School. A street in Santa Cruz de la Palma was named after him in 1984 and a major retrospective was held there on the centenary of his death in 2009.
