= Mike Vanvleet =

American former baseball umpire (born 1970)

- Born: September 23, 1970 (age 55); Battle Creek, Michigan, U.S.
- Occupation: Umpire
- Years active: 2000–2002
- Employer: Major League Baseball

Michael Edward Vanvleet (born 1970) is an American former baseball umpire. Vanvleet umpired in Major League Baseball between 2000 and 2002.

== Minor league umpiring ==
Vanvleet worked in the Midwest League in 1995 and 1996. While working in the International League in 2001, Vanvleet discovered the corked bat of Jose Guillen while the major leaguer was playing in a rehabilitation assignment with the Durham Bulls.

== Major league career ==
Vanvleet umpired a full MLB season in 2000, then appeared sporadically for the next two seasons. He umpired his last major league game on August 25, 2002. Vanvleet was the plate umpire for Mark McGwire's 548th career home run, which tied McGwire for seventh on the all-time career home run list.

== Personal life ==
Vanvleet married Rosana Reboucas in 2010. He works in a human resources role for Stryker Corporation, a medical device company.

== See also ==
- List of Major League Baseball umpires (disambiguation)
