= Ria Cortesio =

American baseball umpire

Ria Cortesio is an American former baseball umpire, working games at the Double A level. In 2007, she became the first woman since Pam Postema in 1989 to work a Major league exhibition game. The 2007 season was her ninth and final professional season and fifth at the Double A level.

== Umpiring career ==
Cortesio attended five-week umpire school. She began umpiring professionally in the minor leagues in 1999, in the short-season Pioneer League. In 2002, she began umpiring at the Double A level, spending five seasons in the Southern League.

She worked both the 2006 All-Star Futures Game and Home Run Derby.

On March 29, 2007, she became the first woman umpire to work in a Major League Baseball exhibition game since Postema in 1989, when she served alternately as the first and third base umpire in a spring training game between the Chicago Cubs and Arizona Diamondbacks.

=== Allegations of sexism in termination ===
At the conclusion of the 2007 season, she was released. According to fellow umpire Kate Sargeant, Cortesio's male colleagues colluded against her to block her advancement to Triple A, where she would have received major league supervision. Cortesio was the top-ranked Double-A umpire at the start of the 2007 season, meaning she would have been eligible for promotion to Triple-A had any umpires at that level retired; Sargeant alleges the Triple-A umpires colluded to not retire and thus not create an opening for Cortesio until the rankings were re-shuffled. By mid-season, when rankings were re-shuffled, hers had dropped from the top spot. According to FanGraphs, the minor leagues had a policy to fire any umpire not promoted after five years; since the 2007 season was her fifth, she was fired.

== Legacy ==
Cortesio was the fifth female umpire in the history of the game, after Bernice Gera, Christine Wren, Postema, and Theresa Cox Fairlady. One of her masks is in the Baseball Hall of Fame.

She is supportive of other female umpires who have come after her.

== Personal ==
Cortesio was born in Davenport, Iowa, in 1976, and is of Italian and Greek descent. She attended Rice University in Houston, Texas.

After her work as a minor league umpire ended, she worked some college games and spent some time in Greece. As of 2018, she resides in Lincoln, Nebraska, where she has a desk job.

== See also ==
- Women in baseball
