= Chris Tiller =

American baseball umpire (born 1978)

- Born: October 25, 1978 (age 47); Shreveport, Louisiana, U.S.
- Occupation: MLB umpire
- Height: 6 ft 5 in (196 cm)

Christopher James Tiller (born October 25, 1978) is an American former Major League Baseball umpire. He made his debut on May 28, 2005, and umpired his last game on August 19, 2011. He wore uniform number 81.

== See also ==
- List of Major League Baseball umpires (disambiguation)
