= Chad Whitson =

American baseball umpire (born 1981)

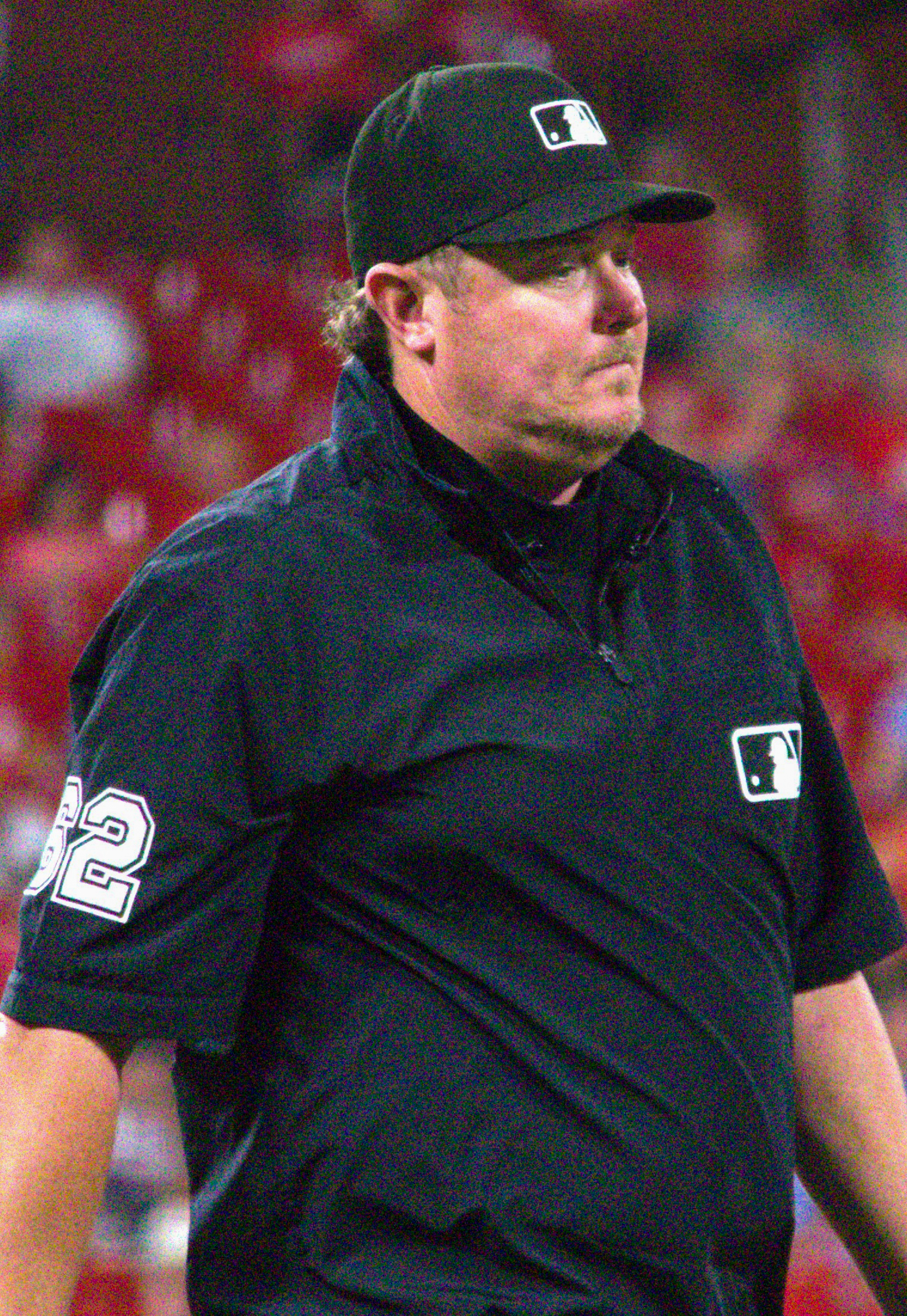

MLB – No. 62
- Umpire
- Born: December 8, 1981 (age 44); Dublin, Ohio, U.S.

MLB debut
- May 15, 2014

Crew information
- Umpiring crew: R
- Crew members: #26 Bill Miller (crew chief); #4 Chad Fairchild; #62 Chad Whitson; #60 Brian Walsh

Career highlights and awards
- Special assignments: Wild Card Games/Series (2022); All-Star Games (2026)

Chad Robert Whitson (born December 8, 1981) is an American umpire in Major League Baseball (MLB) who was hired to the full-time staff in 2019 and wears number 62. He was born in Dublin, Ohio. He made his MLB debut on May 15, 2014. He has also umpired in the Gulf Coast League, the Appalachian League, the South Atlantic League, the California League, the Eastern League, the International League, and the Arizona Fall League.

Whitson ejected San Francisco Giants manager Gabe Kapler from a game on August 15, 2023, in which Whitson made a season-high 16 incorrect calls as the home plate umpire, as Kapler objected to Whitson's calls against rookie Wade Meckler who was playing his second game in the major leagues.

Whitson left a June 2025 game in Chicago early due to heat-related dehydration.

== See also ==
- List of Major League Baseball umpires (disambiguation)
