= List of historical Major League Baseball television broadcasters =

== Local ==
=== American League ===
- Athletics — see list of Athletics broadcasters
- Baltimore Orioles — see list of Baltimore Orioles broadcasters
- Boston Red Sox — see list of Boston Red Sox broadcasters
- Chicago White Sox — see list of Chicago White Sox broadcasters
- Cleveland Guardians — see list of Cleveland Guardians broadcasters
- Detroit Tigers — see list of Detroit Tigers broadcasters
- Houston Astros — see list of Houston Astros broadcasters
- Kansas City Royals — see list of Kansas City Royals broadcasters
- Los Angeles Angels — see list of Los Angeles Angels broadcasters
- Minnesota Twins — see list of Minnesota Twins broadcasters
- New York Yankees — see list of New York Yankees broadcasters
- Seattle Mariners — see list of Seattle Mariners broadcasters
- Tampa Bay Rays — see list of Tampa Bay Rays broadcasters
- Texas Rangers — see list of Texas Rangers broadcasters
- Toronto Blue Jays — see list of Toronto Blue Jays broadcasters

=== National League ===
- Arizona Diamondbacks — see list of Arizona Diamondbacks broadcasters
- Atlanta Braves — see list of Atlanta Braves broadcasters
- Chicago Cubs — see list of Chicago Cubs broadcasters
- Cincinnati Reds — see list of Cincinnati Reds broadcasters
- Colorado Rockies — see list of Colorado Rockies broadcasters
- Los Angeles Dodgers — see list of Los Angeles Dodgers broadcasters
- Miami Marlins — see list of Miami Marlins broadcasters
- Milwaukee Brewers — see list of Milwaukee Brewers broadcasters
- New York Mets — see list of New York Mets broadcasters
- Philadelphia Phillies — see list of Philadelphia Phillies broadcasters
- Pittsburgh Pirates — see list of Pittsburgh Pirates broadcasters
- San Diego Padres — see list of San Diego Padres broadcasters
- San Francisco Giants — see list of San Francisco Giants broadcasters
- St. Louis Cardinals — see list of St. Louis Cardinals broadcasters
- Washington Nationals — see list of Washington Nationals broadcasters

=== Former teams ===
- Boston Braves — see list of Atlanta Braves broadcasters
- Brooklyn Dodgers — see list of Los Angeles Dodgers broadcasters
- Kansas City Athletics — see list of Athletics broadcasters
- Milwaukee Braves — see list of Atlanta Braves broadcasters
- Montreal Expos — see list of Montreal Expos broadcasters
- New York Giants — see list of San Francisco Giants broadcasters
- Oakland Athletics — see list of Athletics broadcasters
- Philadelphia Athletics — see list of Athletics broadcasters
- Seattle Pilots — see list of Milwaukee Brewers broadcasters
- St. Louis Browns — see list of Baltimore Orioles broadcasters
- Washington Senators (1901–1960) — see list of Minnesota Twins broadcasters
- Washington Senators (1961–1971) — see list of Texas Rangers broadcasters

== National ==
English MLB free-to-air television broadcasters
Network	Brand	Years
DuMont	World Series Baseball on DuMont	1947–1949
CBS	Major League Baseball on CBS	1947–1950
CBS	CBS Game of the Week	1955–1964
CBS	Yankees Baseball on CBS	1965
CBS	Major League Baseball on CBS	1990–1993
NBC	NBC Sports Game of the Week (1966–1968)	1947–1989
NBC	Major League Baseball on NBC (1969–1989)	1947–1989
NBC	MLB All-Star Game on NBC	1996–2000
NBC	World Series on NBC	1997–1999
NBC	MLB Sunday Leadoff on NBC	2022–2023
NBC	Major League Baseball on NBC	2026–present
ABC and NBC	The Baseball Network	1994–1995
ABC	World Series Baseball on ABC	1948–1950
ABC	ABC Game of the Week	1953–1954
ABC	Major League Baseball on ABC	1959–1961
ABC	ABC Game of the Week	1965
ABC	Major League Baseball on ABC	1976–1989
ABC	ESPN Major League Baseball on ABC	2020–present
Fox	Major League Baseball on Fox	1996–present

=== Cable ===
Network	Brand	Years
USA Network	USA Network Thursday Night Baseball	1979–1983
ESPN	ESPN Major League Baseball	1990–present
TBS	MLB on TBS	2007–present
Fox Sports 1	MLB on FS1	2014–present

=== Internet television ===
Network	Brand	Years
ESPN	ESPN Major League Baseball	2019–present
HBO Max	MLB on TBS	2022–present
Disney+	ESPN Major League Baseball	2024–present
ESPN DTC	ESPN Major League Baseball	2026–present
Peacock	MLB Sunday Leadoff on Peacock	2022–2023
Peacock	Major League Baseball on NBC	2026–present
The Roku Channel	MLB Sunday Leadoff on Roku	2024–2025
Fox One	Major League Baseball on Fox	2025–present

== Postseason coverage ==
Years	World Series
1947	CBS, DuMont, NBC
1948	ABC, CBS, DuMont, NBC
1949	ABC, CBS, DuMont, NBC
1950	ABC, CBS, NBC
1951	NBC
1952	NBC
1953	NBC
1954	NBC
1955	NBC
1956	NBC
1957	NBC
1958	NBC
1959	NBC
1960	NBC
1961	NBC
1962	NBC
1963	NBC
1964	NBC
1965	NBC
1966	NBC
1967	NBC
1968	NBC

Years	Wild Card		LDS		LCS		World Series
Years	ALWC	NLWC	ALDS	NLDS	ALCS	NLCS	World Series
1969	—N/a	—N/a	—N/a	—N/a	NBC	NBC	NBC
1970	—N/a	—N/a	—N/a	—N/a	NBC	NBC	NBC
1971	—N/a	—N/a	—N/a	—N/a	NBC	NBC	NBC
1972	—N/a	—N/a	—N/a	—N/a	NBC	NBC	NBC
1973	—N/a	—N/a	—N/a	—N/a	NBC	NBC	NBC
1974	—N/a	—N/a	—N/a	—N/a	NBC	NBC	NBC
1975	—N/a	—N/a	—N/a	—N/a	NBC	NBC	NBC
1976	—N/a	—N/a	—N/a	—N/a	ABC	ABC	NBC
1977	—N/a	—N/a	—N/a	—N/a	NBC	NBC	ABC
1978	—N/a	—N/a	—N/a	—N/a	ABC	ABC	NBC
1979	—N/a	—N/a	—N/a	—N/a	NBC	NBC	ABC
1980	—N/a	—N/a	—N/a	—N/a	ABC	ABC	NBC
1981	—N/a	—N/a	ABC	NBC	NBC	NBC	ABC
1982	—N/a	—N/a	—N/a	—N/a	ABC	ABC	NBC
1983	—N/a	—N/a	—N/a	—N/a	NBC	NBC	ABC
1984	—N/a	—N/a	—N/a	—N/a	ABC	ABC	NBC
1985	—N/a	—N/a	—N/a	—N/a	NBC	NBC	ABC
1986	—N/a	—N/a	—N/a	—N/a	ABC	ABC	NBC
1987	—N/a	—N/a	—N/a	—N/a	NBC	NBC	ABC
1988	—N/a	—N/a	—N/a	—N/a	ABC	ABC	NBC
1989	—N/a	—N/a	—N/a	—N/a	NBC	NBC	ABC
1990	—N/a	—N/a	—N/a	—N/a	CBS	CBS	CBS
1991	—N/a	—N/a	—N/a	—N/a	CBS	CBS	CBS
1992	—N/a	—N/a	—N/a	—N/a	CBS	CBS	CBS
1993	—N/a	—N/a	—N/a	—N/a	CBS	CBS	CBS
1994	—N/a	—N/a	~~ABC~~	~~ABC~~	~~NBC~~	~~NBC~~	~~ABC~~
1995	—N/a	—N/a	ABC, NBC	ABC, NBC	ABC, NBC	ABC, NBC	ABC, NBC
1996	—N/a	—N/a	ESPN, Fox, NBC	ESPN, Fox, NBC	NBC	Fox	Fox
1997	—N/a	—N/a	ESPN, Fox, NBC	ESPN, NBC	Fox	NBC	NBC
1998	—N/a	—N/a	ESPN, Fox, NBC	ESPN, Fox, NBC	NBC	Fox	Fox
1999	—N/a	—N/a	ESPN, Fox, NBC	ESPN, NBC	Fox	NBC	NBC
2000	—N/a	—N/a	ESPN, Fox, NBC	ESPN, Fox	NBC	Fox	Fox
2001	—N/a	—N/a	Fox Family, Fox	Fox Family, Fox	Fox	Fox	Fox
2002	—N/a	—N/a	ABC Family, Fox	ABC Family, Fox, FX	Fox	Fox	Fox
2003	—N/a	—N/a	ESPN, Fox	ESPN, Fox	Fox	Fox	Fox
2004	—N/a	—N/a	ESPN, Fox	ESPN, Fox	Fox	Fox	Fox
2005	—N/a	—N/a	ESPN, Fox	ESPN, Fox	Fox	Fox	Fox
2006	—N/a	—N/a	ESPN, Fox	ESPN, Fox	Fox	Fox	Fox
2007	—N/a	—N/a	TBS	TBS	Fox	TBS	Fox
2008	—N/a	—N/a	TBS	TBS	TBS	Fox	Fox
2009	—N/a	—N/a	TBS	TBS	Fox	TBS	Fox
2010	—N/a	—N/a	TBS	TBS	TBS	Fox	Fox
2011	—N/a	—N/a	TBS	TBS	Fox	TBS	Fox
2012	TBS	TBS	MLB Network, TBS	MLB Network, TBS	TBS	Fox	Fox
2013	TBS	TBS	MLB Network, TBS	MLB Network, TBS	Fox	TBS	Fox
2014	TBS	ESPN	TBS	FS1, MLB Network	TBS	Fox, FS1	Fox
2015	ESPN	TBS	FS1, MLB Network	TBS	Fox, FS1	TBS	Fox
2016	TBS	ESPN	TBS	FS1, MLB Network	TBS	FS1	Fox
2017	ESPN	TBS	FS1, MLB Network	TBS	Fox, FS1	TBS	Fox
2018	TBS	ESPN	TBS	FS1, MLB Network	TBS	Fox, FS1	Fox
2019	ESPN	TBS	FS1, MLB Network	TBS	Fox, FS1	TBS	Fox
2020	ABC, ESPN, TBS	ABC, ESPN	TBS	FS1, MLB Network	TBS	Fox, FS1	Fox
2021	ESPN	TBS	FS1, MLB Network	TBS	Fox, FS1	TBS	Fox
2022	ESPN	ABC, ESPN	TBS	Fox, FS1	TBS	Fox, FS1	Fox
2023	ABC, ESPN	ESPN	Fox, FS1	TBS	Fox, FS1	TBS	Fox
2024	ABC, ESPN	ESPN	TBS	Fox, FS1	TBS	Fox, FS1	Fox
2025	ABC, ESPN	ABC, ESPN	Fox, FS1	TBS	Fox, FS1	TBS	Fox
2026	NBC	NBC	TBS	Fox, FS1	TBS	Fox, FS1	Fox

Since 2007, MLB playoff games on TBS are not made available to local over-the-air broadcasters in the participating teams' markets. Under the previous contract, ESPN was required to make those games available on the air in local markets. As of 2023, Major League Baseball is currently the only "Big Four" league with regional broadcast rights whose entire postseason is exclusive to national television; the National Basketball Association playoffs and National Hockey League playoffs continue to air their first round games on both national and local television.

== See also ==
- List of current Major League Baseball broadcasters
- The Baseball Network announcers
- Historical NBA over-the-air television broadcasters
- Historical NHL over-the-air television broadcasters
