= 1988 Major League Baseball postseason =

1988 Major League Baseball playoffs

Tournament details
- Dates: October 4–20, 1988
- Teams: 4

Final positions
- Champions: Los Angeles Dodgers (6th title)
- Runners-up: Oakland Athletics

Tournament statistics
- Games played: 16
- Attendance: 801,055 (50,066 per game)
- Most HRs: Jose Canseco (OAK) (4)
- Most SBs: Steve Sax (LA) (6)
- Most Ks (as pitcher): Orel Hershiser (LA) (32)

Awards
- MVP: Orel Hershiser (LA)

The 1988 Major League Baseball postseason was the playoff tournament of Major League Baseball for the 1988 season. The winners of each division advance to the postseason and face each other in a League Championship Series to determine the pennant winners that face each other in the World Series.

In the American League, the Boston Red Sox returned for the second time in three years, and the Oakland Athletics returned to the postseason for the first time since 1981. This was the first of three straight appearances for the Athletics.

In the National League, the New York Mets returned to the postseason for the second time in three years, and the Los Angeles Dodgers returned to the postseason for the fourth and final time this decade. This was the last postseason appearance for the Mets until 1999.

The playoffs began on October 4, 1988, and concluded on October 20, 1988, with the Dodgers shocking the Athletics in five games in the 1988 World Series. The series was notable for injured Dodger Kirk Gibson's dramatic pinch-hit walk-off home run off Athletics closer Dennis Eckersley in Game 1. It was the second title in nine years for the Dodgers, and their sixth overall; as of 2024, they have won two World Series since.

== Playoff seeds ==
American League Teams National League Teams

The following teams qualified for the postseason:

=== American League ===
- Boston Red Sox – 89–73, AL East champions
- Oakland Athletics – 104–58, AL West champions

=== National League ===
- New York Mets – 100–60, NL East champions
- Los Angeles Dodgers – 94–67, NL West champions

== Playoff bracket ==
League Championship Series (ALCS, NLCS)
East	Boston	0
West	Oakland	4
East	NY Mets	3
West	Los Angeles	4

World Series
AL	Oakland	1
NL	Los Angeles	4

== American League Championship Series ==
=== Boston Red Sox vs. Oakland Athletics ===
Oakland won the series, 4–0.

Game	Date	Score	Location	Time	Attendance
1	October 5	Oakland Athletics – 2, Boston Red Sox – 1	Fenway Park	2:55	34,104
2	October 6	Oakland Athletics – 4, Boston Red Sox – 3	Fenway Park	3:14	34,605
3	October 8	Boston Red Sox – 6, Oakland Athletics – 10	Oakland-Alameda County Coliseum	3:14	49,261
4	October 9	Boston Red Sox – 1, Oakland Athletics – 4	Oakland-Alameda County Coliseum	2:55	49,406

This was a rematch of the 1975 ALCS, which the Red Sox won in a sweep over the Athletics before falling in the World Series, ending the Athletics’ hopes for a fourth consecutive title. This time, the Athletics returned the favor, sweeping the Red Sox to return to the World Series for the first time since 1974 (in the process denying a rematch of the 1916 World Series between the Red Sox and Dodgers).

Despite ending in a sweep, each game of the series was decided by four runs or less. Rick Honeycutt helped keep the Red Sox offense at bay in Game 1 as the Athletics narrowly prevailed. The Athletics won by one run again in Game 2, as in the top of the ninth, singles by Ron Hassey, Tony Phillips, and Walt Weiss scored Hassey to break a 3–3 tie and put the A's up for good. When the series moved to Oakland, the Athletics prevailed in a Game 3 slugfest, 10–6, to go up 3–0 in the series. Dave Stewart and ace closer Dennis Eckersley held the Red Sox to just one run in Game 4 as the Athletics completed the sweep and secured the pennant.

This was the first of three straight AL pennants won by the Athletics. The next year, they defeated the Toronto Blue Jays in five games en route to their most recent championship, and in 1990 they again defeated the Red Sox in a sweep before falling in the World Series, which would ultimately be their last during their time in Oakland, as the team would move to Las Vegas.

This was the first of four consecutive losses for the Red Sox in the ALCS. In 1990, they would be swept by the Athletics again, and in 1999 and 2003 they lost both to their archrival in the New York Yankees. It would be in 2004 that the Red Sox would finally win the pennant again.

== National League Championship Series ==
=== Los Angeles Dodgers vs. New York Mets ===
Los Angeles won the series, 4–3.

Game	Date	Score	Location	Time	Attendance
1	October 4	New York Mets – 3, Los Angeles Dodgers – 2	Dodger Stadium	2:45	55,582
2	October 5	New York Mets – 3, Los Angeles Dodgers – 6	Dodger Stadium	3:10	55,780
3	October 8	Los Angeles Dodgers – 4, New York Mets – 8	Shea Stadium	3:44	44,672
4	October 9	Los Angeles Dodgers – 5, New York Mets – 4 (12)	Shea Stadium	4:29	54,014
5	October 10	Los Angeles Dodgers – 7, New York Mets – 4	Shea Stadium	3:07	52,069
6	October 11	New York Mets – 5, Los Angeles Dodgers – 1	Dodger Stadium	3:16	55,885
7	October 12	New York Mets – 0, Los Angeles Dodgers – 6	Dodger Stadium	2:51	55,693

This was the first postseason meeting between the Mets and Dodgers. The Dodgers upset the heavily favored Mets in seven games to return to the World Series for the first time since 1981 (in the process denying a rematch of the 1973 World Series between the Mets and Athletics).

In Game 1, the Dodgers were three outs away from victory, but the Mets, thanks to a three-run RBI from Gary Carter, came from behind to win. In Game 2, the Dodgers’ offense got to Mets’ ace David Cone early and prevailed by three runs to even the series headed to Queens. In Game 3, the Dodgers led 4-3 going into the bottom of the eighth, but the Mets put up five unanswered runs to win and regain the series lead. Game 4 was a long and grueling extra inning battle that was won by the Dodgers, as Kirk Gibson hit a two-out solo homer in the top of the twelfth to put the Dodgers ahead for good. Gibson hit his second homer of the series in Game 5 as the Dodgers won to take a 3–2 series lead heading back to Los Angeles. Cone redeemed him with a complete game performance as the Mets won Game 6 to force a seventh game. In Game 7, Orel Hershiser, despite being on three-days rest, pitched a five-hit complete game shutout as the Dodgers won 6-0 to secure the pennant.

This was the first time that the Mets lost in the NLCS. Previously, they had won the pennant in each of their last three appearances in 1969, 1973 and 1986. The Mets returned to the NLCS in 1999, but lost to the Atlanta Braves in six games. The Mets would win their next pennant in 2000 over the St. Louis Cardinals in five games before falling in the World Series that year.

The Dodgers would eventually return to the NLCS in 2008, but lost to the eventual World Series champion Philadelphia Phillies in five games. The Dodgers would have to wait until 2017 to win their next pennant, which came against the Chicago Cubs in five games before they came up short in the World Series.

The Mets and Dodgers would meet in the postseason again in the NLDS in 2006 and 2015, as well as the NLCS again in 2024, with the Mets winning the former two and the Dodgers winning the latter en route to a World Series title.

== 1988 World Series ==
=== Oakland Athletics (AL) vs. Los Angeles Dodgers (NL) ===
Los Angeles won the series, 4–1.

Game	Date	Score	Location	Time	Attendance
1	October 15	Oakland Athletics – 4, Los Angeles Dodgers – 5	Dodger Stadium	3:04	55,983
2	October 16	Oakland Athletics – 0, Los Angeles Dodgers – 6	Dodger Stadium	2:30	56,051
3	October 18	Los Angeles Dodgers – 1, Oakland Athletics – 2	Oakland–Alameda County Coliseum	3:21	49,316
4	October 19	Los Angeles Dodgers – 4, Oakland Athletics – 3	Oakland–Alameda County Coliseum	3:05	49,317
5	October 20	Los Angeles Dodgers – 5, Oakland Athletics – 2	Oakland–Alameda County Coliseum	2:51	49,317

This was the second all-California World Series. It was also a rematch of the 1974 World Series, which the Athletics won in five games en route to a three-peat. This time, the Dodgers returned the favor, as they upset the heavily-favored Athletics in five games to win their sixth championship in franchise history.

The series started off in shocking fashion, as injured Dodger Kirk Gibson's dramatic pinch-hit walk-off two-run home run off Athletics closer Dennis Eckersley in Game 1, which gave the Dodgers a 5-4 win. Game 1 would ultimately be Gibson’s final postseason game. Orel Hershiser pitched a three-hit complete-game shutout in Game 2 as the Dodgers blew out the Athletics to take a 2–0 series lead headed to Oakland. The Athletics would take Game 3 off a walk-off home run from Mark McGwire to avoid a sweep, but that would be their only win of the series. Dodgers' relief pitcher Jay Howell held off a late comeback by the Athletics in Game 4 to preserve a one-run Dodgers victory and take a commanding 3–1 series lead. In Game 5, the Dodgers jumped out to an early lead in the first inning and maintained it, thanks to stellar pitching from Hershiser, who pitched another complete game in a 5–2 Dodger victory. Hershiser got the final out by striking out Tony Phillips, as the Dodgers clinched the title in Oakland.

After the championship win, the Dodgers fell into a rare and unusual slump for almost three decades. The Dodgers eventually returned to the World Series in 2017, but they lost to the Houston Astros in seven games. The Dodgers’ next title would come in 2020 against the Tampa Bay Rays in six games, which marked the start of a dynasty for the team.

36 years later, Gibson’s Game 1 walk-off would be replicated by Freddie Freeman in Game 1 of the 2024 World Series, who hit a walk-off grand slam in the bottom of the tenth inning of Game 1 against the New York Yankees. Freeman’s walk-off would end up being widely compared to Gibson’s, as both of their home runs were to right field at Dodger Stadium in almost the same spot and both came at 8:37 PM Pacific Time. Joe Davis, who was the color commentator for the 2024 World Series, paid tribute to Vin Scully’s call of Gibson’s walk-off with the line “Freeman hits a ball, right field — she is.... gone! Gibby, meet Freddie! Game 1 of the World Series!” Also like in 1988, the Dodgers would end up winning that World Series in five games.

This was the first of three straight World Series appearances for the Athletics, which would ultimately be their last appearances in the Fall Classic during their time in Oakland as the team would move to Las Vegas after the 2024 season. The Athletics would return to the World Series the very next year, and swept their cross-town rivals in the San Francisco Giants in another all-California matchup for their most recent championship. They also made one more appearance in 1990, only to be swept by the Cincinnati Reds.

== Broadcasting ==
ABC televised both LCS nationally in the United States. NBC then aired the World Series.
