= 1999 Major League Baseball postseason =

1999 Major League Baseball playoffs

Tournament details
- Dates: October 5–27, 1999
- Teams: 8

Final positions
- Champions: New York Yankees (25th title)
- Runners-up: Atlanta Braves

Tournament statistics
- Most HRs: Three tied (4)
- Most SBs: Rickey Henderson (NYM) (7)
- Most Ks (as pitcher): Orlando Hernández (NYY) (27)

Awards
- MVP: Mariano Rivera (NYY)

The 1999 Major League Baseball postseason was the playoff tournament of Major League Baseball for the 1999 season. The winners of the League Division Series would move on to the League Championship Series to determine the pennant winners that face each other in the World Series.

In the American League, the New York Yankees and Cleveland Indians returned to the postseason for the fifth straight time, and the Boston Red Sox and Texas Rangers returned for the second year in a row. This was Texas’ last postseason appearance until 2010.

In the National League, the Atlanta Braves made their eighth straight postseason appearance, the Houston Astros made their third straight appearance, the New York Mets made their first appearance since 1988, and the Arizona Diamondbacks made their postseason debut two years into their existence.

The postseason began on October 5, 1999, and ended on October 27, 1999, with the Yankees sweeping the Braves in the 1999 World Series. It was the Yankees' 25th title, which made them the team with the most championship wins in North American sports, surpassing the NHL’s Montreal Canadiens who won 24.

The 1998-99 Yankees were the last team to win back-to-back championships (that was not part of a three-peat) until the Los Angeles Dodgers did so in 2024 and 2025.

== Playoff seeds ==
American League Teams National League Teams

The following teams qualified for the postseason:

=== American League ===
1. New York Yankees – 98–64, AL East champions
2. Cleveland Indians – 97–65, AL Central champions
3. Texas Rangers – 95–67, AL West champions
4. Boston Red Sox – 94–68

=== National League ===
1. Atlanta Braves – 103–59, NL East champions
2. Arizona Diamondbacks – 100–62, NL West champions
3. Houston Astros – 97–65, NL Central champions
4. New York Mets – 97–66

== Playoff bracket ==
Division Series (ALDS, NLDS)
1	NY Yankees	3
3	Texas	0
American League
2	Cleveland	2
4	Boston	3
1	Atlanta	3
3	Houston	1
National League
2	Arizona	1
4	NY Mets	3

League Championship Series (ALCS, NLCS)
1	NY Yankees	4
4	Boston	1
1	Atlanta	4
4	NY Mets	2

World Series
AL1	NY Yankees	4
NL1	Atlanta	0

Note: Two teams in the same division could not meet in the division series.

== American League Division Series ==
=== (1) New York Yankees vs. (3) Texas Rangers ===
New York won the series, 3–0.

Game	Date	Score	Location	Time	Attendance
1	October 5	Texas Rangers – 0, New York Yankees – 8	Yankee Stadium (I)	3:37	57,099
2	October 7	Texas Rangers – 1, New York Yankees – 3	Yankee Stadium (I)	3:32	57,485
3	October 9	New York Yankees – 3, Texas Rangers – 0	The Ballpark in Arlington	3:00	50,269

This was the third postseason meeting between the Yankees and Rangers. The Yankees once again swept the Rangers to return to the ALCS for the fourth time in six years.

This series was not close - the Yankees once again held the Rangers to only one run scored throughout the entire series. Orlando Hernández pitched eight scoreless innings as the Yankees blew out the Rangers in a Game 1 shutout. Andy Pettitte and Mariano Rivera kept the Rangers’ offense at bay in Game 2 as the Yankees won 3–1, with the Rangers’ only run coming from a home run by Juan González. In Arlington for Game 3, Roger Clemens and Rivera shutout the Rangers as the Yankees completed the sweep.

Both teams would meet one more time in the ALCS in 2010, and the Rangers would finally break through before falling in the World Series that year to the San Francisco Giants in five games, becoming the first victim of a Giants dynasty of three titles in five years from 2010 to 2014.

=== (2) Cleveland Indians vs. (4) Boston Red Sox ===
Boston won the series, 3–2.

Game	Date	Score	Location	Time	Attendance
1	October 6	Boston Red Sox – 2, Cleveland Indians – 3	Jacobs Field	2:53	45,182
2	October 7	Boston Red Sox – 1, Cleveland Indians – 11	Jacobs Field	2:47	45,184
3	October 9	Cleveland Indians – 3, Boston Red Sox – 9	Fenway Park	3:08	33,539
4	October 10	Cleveland Indians – 7, Boston Red Sox – 23	Fenway Park	3:49	33,898
5	October 11	Boston Red Sox – 12, Cleveland Indians – 8	Jacobs Field	3:12	45,114

This was the third postseason meeting between the Indians and Red Sox. The Red Sox overcame a two-games-to-none series deficit to defeat the Indians in five games, reaching the ALCS for the first time since 1990.

The Indians controlled the tempo of the first two games - they won Game 1 thanks to a walk-off RBI single from Travis Fryman and blew out the Red Sox in Game 2, capped off by a grand slam from Jim Thome. In Boston, things got ugly for the Indians. The Red Sox blew out the Indians in Game 3 to get on the board in the series. Game 4 was the most notable game of the entire series, as the Red Sox decimated the Indians by a 23–7 score, handing the Indians their worst postseason loss ever. The 23 runs scored by the Red Sox in Game 4 still stands as an MLB record for most runs scored by one team in a single postseason game. Game 5 was an offensive shootout through three innings, with the Indians leading 8-7 after the third. Red Sox ace Pedro Martinez entered in relief and shut down the Indians for six innings, not allowing a single hit. The game was ultimately won by the Red Sox, capped off by a grand slam from Troy O'Leary. This was the first playoff series win by the Red Sox since winning the American League pennant in 1986.

The Red Sox and Indians/Guardians would meet again in the ALCS in 2007 and the ALDS in 2016, with the Red Sox winning the former en route to a World Series title, and the Indians winning the latter before coming up short in the World Series.

== National League Division Series ==
=== (1) Atlanta Braves vs. (3) Houston Astros ===
Atlanta won the series, 3–1.

Game	Date	Score	Location	Time	Attendance
1	October 5	Houston Astros – 6, Atlanta Braves – 1	Turner Field	3:03	39,119
2	October 6	Houston Astros – 1, Atlanta Braves – 5	Turner Field	2:13	41,913
3	October 8	Atlanta Braves – 5, Houston Astros – 3 (12)	Astrodome	4:19	48,625
4	October 9	Atlanta Braves – 7, Houston Astros – 5	Astrodome	3:12	48,553

This was the second postseason meeting between the Braves and Astros. The Braves once again defeated the Astros to return to the NLCS for a record eighth straight time.

The Astros stole Game 1 on the road in a blowout win thanks to home runs from Daryle Ward and Ken Caminiti. However, they committed numerous errors in Game 2 that led to the series being tied headed back home. In Game 3, the Braves led 3–2 going into the seventh, until the Astros tied the game off an RBI single from Bill Spiers that forced extra innings, where the Braves won off a two-run RBI double from Brian Jordan in the top of the twelfth. In Game 4, the Braves jumped out to a big lead early, then the Astros cut the lead to two in the bottom of the eighth. However, John Rocker ended the Astros’ rally in the bottom of the ninth to give the Braves the win. Game 4 was the last game ever played at the Astrodome.

The Braves and Astros would meet again in the NLDS in 2001, 2004, and 2005, with the Braves winning the former and the Astros winning the latter two. They would also meet in the 2021 World Series, which was won by the Braves in six games.

=== (2) Arizona Diamondbacks vs. (4) New York Mets ===
New York won the series, 3–1.

Game	Date	Score	Location	Time	Attendance
1	October 5	New York Mets – 8, Arizona Diamondbacks – 4	Bank One Ballpark	2:53	49,584
2	October 6	New York Mets – 1, Arizona Diamondbacks – 7	Bank One Ballpark	3:13	49,328
3	October 8	Arizona Diamondbacks – 2, New York Mets – 9	Shea Stadium	3:05	56,180
4	October 9	Arizona Diamondbacks – 3, New York Mets – 4 (10)	Shea Stadium	3:23	56,177

This was the first postseason in franchise history for the Diamondbacks, as they made it in their second year in their history, becoming the fastest expansion team to accomplish such a feat. The Mets defeated the Diamondbacks in four games to return to the NLCS for the first time since 1988.

In Phoenix, the Mets stole Game 1 on the road thanks to a home run from John Olerud and a grand slam from Edgardo Alfonzo. Todd Stottlemyre pitched six solid innings for the Diamondbacks as they won their first playoff game in franchise history in a blowout win in Game 2 to even the series headed to Queens. Rick Reed and the Mets bullpen silenced the Diamondbacks’ offense in Game 3 as they prevailed in a blowout win. In Game 4, the Diamondbacks took the lead in top of the eighth thanks to a two-run double from Jay Bell, but the Mets tied the game in the bottom of the inning thanks to a sacrifice fly from Roger Cedeño, which forced extra innings. The Mets won the series in the bottom of the tenth thanks to a walk-off home run from Todd Pratt. This was the first playoff series won by the Mets since the 1986 World Series.

The next postseason appearance for the Diamondbacks would be in 2001, where they went on to win the World Series against the New York Yankees in seven games.

== American League Championship Series ==
=== (1) New York Yankees vs. (4) Boston Red Sox ===
New York won the series, 4–1.

Game	Date	Score	Location	Time	Attendance
1	October 13	Boston Red Sox – 3, New York Yankees – 4 (10)	Yankee Stadium (I)	3:39	57,181
2	October 14	Boston Red Sox – 2, New York Yankees – 3	Yankee Stadium (I)	3:46	57,180
3	October 16	New York Yankees – 1, Boston Red Sox – 13	Fenway Park	3:14	33,190
4	October 17	New York Yankees – 9, Boston Red Sox – 2	Fenway Park	3:39	33,586
5	October 18	New York Yankees – 6, Boston Red Sox – 1	Fenway Park	4:09	33,589

This was the first edition of the postseason where both teams from New York City appeared in the LCS, a phenomenon that has only repeated twice since (2000, 2024).

This was the first postseason meeting in the history of the Red Sox–Yankees rivalry. The Yankees defeated the Red Sox in five games to return to the World Series for the fourth time in five years.

Bernie Williams won Game 1 for the Yankees with a walk-off home run in the bottom of the tenth. In Game 2, the Red Sox held a narrow lead, but it was gone in the bottom of the seventh as the Yankees put up two unanswered runs to take a 2-0 series lead headed to Boston. Game 3 was the anticipated matchup between Pedro Martínez and Roger Clemens, which the Red Sox won in a blowout, 13–1, to avoid a sweep. Game 3 was known for chants thrown at Clemens by the Fenway Park crowd as he was retired in the third inning, as they shouted "Where is Roger?" and then followed up with "In the Shower!". However, the Yankees responded by blowing out the Red Sox in Game 4 to take a 3–1 series lead. In Game 5, Orlando Hernández pitched seven innings of shutout ball as the Yankees won 6-1 to clinch the pennant.

The Yankees returned to the ALCS the next year, and defeated the Seattle Mariners in six games en route to completing a World Series three-peat.

Both teams would meet again in the ALCS in 2003 and 2004, the ALDS in 2018, and the AL Wild Card in 2021, 2025, and 2026, with the Yankees winning in 2003, 2025 and 2026, and the Red Sox winning in 2004, 2018, and 2021.

== National League Championship Series ==
=== (1) Atlanta Braves vs. (4) New York Mets ===
Atlanta won the series, 4–2.

Game	Date	Score	Location	Time	Attendance
1	October 12	New York Mets – 2, Atlanta Braves – 4	Turner Field	3:09	44,172
2	October 13	New York Mets – 3, Atlanta Braves – 4	Turner Field	2:42	44,624
3	October 15	Atlanta Braves – 1, New York Mets – 0	Shea Stadium	3:04	55,911
4	October 16	Atlanta Braves – 2, New York Mets – 3	Shea Stadium	2:20	55,872
5	October 17	Atlanta Braves – 3, New York Mets – 4 (15)	Shea Stadium	5:46	55,723
6	October 19	New York Mets – 9, Atlanta Braves – 10 (11)	Turner Field	4:25	52,335

This was the first edition of the postseason where both teams from New York City appeared in the LCS, a phenomenon that has only repeated twice since (2000, 2024).

This was a rematch of the very first NLCS from 1969, which the Miracle Mets squad won in a sweep over the Braves en route to their first World Series title. On the 30th anniversary of the first-ever NLCS, the Braves returned the favor, defeating the Mets in six games to return to the World Series for the fifth time this decade.

Greg Maddux pitched seven solid innings as the Braves took Game 1. Kevin Millwood pitched another strong seven innings as the Braves took Game 2 to go up 2–0 in the series headed to Queens. In Game 3, Tom Glavine pitched seven innings of shutout ball and the Braves’ bullpen silenced the Mets offense to take a commanding three games to none series lead. However, the Braves weren’t out of the woods just yet. In Game 4, the Braves were four outs away from sweeping the series, until a two-run RBI single from John Olerud put the Mets in the lead for good as they avoided elimination. Game 5 was a long and grueling contest that went into extras, and with the Braves two outs away from winning the series in the bottom of the fifteenth, Robin Ventura hit a walk-off bases loaded blast to send the series back to Atlanta. Game 6 was a massive back-and-forth slugfest that went down to the wire in extra innings. In the top of the tenth, the Mets took a one-run lead and were three outs away from forcing a seventh game, however the Braves countered by tying the game in the bottom of the inning to stay alive. In the bottom of the eleventh, the Braves loaded the bases thanks to two intentional walks from New York's Kenny Rogers, who then walked Andruw Jones on a 3–2 count, giving the Braves the win on a walk-off walk. Game 6 was Orel Hershiser’s final postseason game.

The Mets would return to the NLCS the next year, and defeated the St. Louis Cardinals in five games before coming up short in the World Series.

The 1999 NLCS marked the end of the Braves’ eight-year streak of consecutive NLCS appearances, which started in 1991 (excluding 1994, when the season was canceled). The Braves would return to the NLCS in 2001, but lost to the eventual World Series champion Arizona Diamondbacks in five games. This was the last pennant won by the Braves until 2021, where the 88-win Braves pulled off one of the biggest upsets in postseason history, knocking off a 106-win Los Angeles Dodgers team in six games en route to a World Series title.

== 1999 World Series ==
=== (AL1) New York Yankees vs. (NL1) Atlanta Braves ===
New York won the series, 4–0.

Game	Date	Score	Location	Time	Attendance
1	October 23	New York Yankees – 4, Atlanta Braves – 1	Turner Field	2:57	51,342
2	October 24	New York Yankees – 7, Atlanta Braves – 2	Turner Field	3:14	51,226
3	October 26	Atlanta Braves – 5, New York Yankees – 6 (10)	Yankee Stadium	3:16	56,794
4	October 27	Atlanta Braves – 1, New York Yankees – 4	Yankee Stadium	2:58	56,752

This was the fourth World Series matchup between the Yankees and Braves (1957, 1958, 1996). The Yankees swept the MLB-best Braves to repeat as World Series champions, winning their third title in the past four years.

Orlando Hernández pitched seven shutout innings as the Yankees stole Game 1 on the road. David Cone pitched another seven innings of shutout ball in Game 2 as the Yankees blew out the Braves to go up 2–0 in the series headed to the Bronx. The only close battle of the series occurred in Game 3, as the game remained tied at five runs each going into extra innings until New York's Chad Curtis hit a walk-off solo home run in the bottom of the tenth to put the Yankees ahead 3–0 in the series. The Yankees closed out the series with a solid seven-inning performance from Roger Clemens in Game 4. Game 4 was the last World Series game ever broadcast by NBC. The 1999 World Series marked the last time the Yankees clinched the championship at the original Yankee Stadium.

With the win, the Yankees improved their record in the World Series against the Braves to 3–1 all-time, having previously won in 1958 and 1996. Additionally, the Yankees officially surpassed the NHL’s Montreal Canadiens as the team with the most championships in North American sports, a status they still hold today. The Yankees became the first team to win the World Series in back-to-back sweeps since they did so in 1938 and 1939, and still remain the only franchise in the MLB to accomplish such a feat. The 1998-99 Yankees were the most recent team to win back-to-back championships (that was not part of a three-peat) until the Los Angeles Dodgers did so in 2024 and 2025. They returned to the World Series the next year, and defeated their cross-town rival in the New York Mets in five games to finish off a three-peat.

The Braves became the seventh 100+ win team to be swept in the postseason and first since the 1990 Oakland Athletics, who were also swept in the World Series. The Braves would eventually return to the World Series in 2021, and defeated the Houston Astros in six games for their most recent championship.

This was the first World Series to feature both #1 seeds from the American and National leagues since seeding began in 1998, a phenomenon that has only been repeated thrice since, in 2013, 2020, and 2024.

== Broadcasting ==
This was the fourth season under a five-year U.S. rights agreement with ESPN, Fox, and NBC. Division Series games aired across ESPN, ESPN2, Fox, and NBC. Fox then televised the American League Championship Series, while NBC aired both the National League Championship Series and the World Series. This would eventually mark the last time that NBC televised the World Series.
