= 1999 American League Championship Series =

30th edition of Major League Baseball's American League Championship Series

| Team (Wins) | Managers | Season |
|---|---|---|
| New York Yankees (4) | Joe Torre | 98–64 (.605), GA: 4 |
| Boston Red Sox (1) | Jimy Williams | 94–68 (.580), GB: 4 |
- Dates: October 13–18
- MVP: Orlando Hernández (New York)
- Umpires: Tim McClelland, Dan Morrison, Rick Reed, Al Clark, Dale Scott, Tim Tschida

Broadcast
- Television: Fox
- TV announcers: Joe Buck, Tim McCarver, and Bob Brenly
- Radio: ESPN
- Radio announcers: Ernie Harwell and Rick Sutcliffe
- ALDS: New York Yankees over Texas Rangers (3–0); Boston Red Sox over Cleveland Indians (3–2)

The 1999 American League Championship Series (ALCS) was a best-of-seven playoff series in Major League Baseball’s 1999 postseason pitting the defending World Series champion New York Yankees against the fourth-seeeded Boston Red Sox for the American League pennant. The Series began October 13 and ended on October 18. The Yankees held home-field advantage by virtue of having a better regular season record.

The Yankees won the series, 4–1. They won their 36th American League pennant and went on to win the World Series against the Atlanta Braves in a sweep to repeat as World Series champions.

This was the first edition of the postseason where both teams from New York City appeared in the LCS, a phenomenon that has only repeated twice since (2000, 2024).

== Summary ==
=== New York Yankees vs. Boston Red Sox ===
New York won the series, 4–1.

| Game | Date | Score | Location | Time | Attendance |
|---|---|---|---|---|---|
| 1 | October 13 | Boston Red Sox – 3, New York Yankees – 4 (10) | Yankee Stadium (I) | 3:39 | 57,181 |
| 2 | October 14 | Boston Red Sox – 2, New York Yankees – 3 | Yankee Stadium (I) | 3:46 | 57,180 |
| 3 | October 16 | New York Yankees – 1, Boston Red Sox – 13 | Fenway Park | 3:14 | 33,190 |
| 4 | October 17 | New York Yankees – 9, Boston Red Sox – 2 | Fenway Park | 3:39 | 33,586 |
| 5 | October 18 | New York Yankees – 6, Boston Red Sox – 1 | Fenway Park | 4:09 | 33,589 |

== Game summaries ==
=== Game 1 ===
October 13, 1999 8:17 pm (EDT) at Yankee Stadium (I) in Bronx, New York 66 °F (19 °C), cloudy
| Team | 1 | 2 | 3 | 4 | 5 | 6 | 7 | 8 | 9 | 10 | R | H | E |
|---|---|---|---|---|---|---|---|---|---|---|---|---|---|
| Boston | 2 | 1 | 0 | 0 | 0 | 0 | 0 | 0 | 0 | 0 | 3 | 8 | 3 |
| New York | 0 | 2 | 0 | 0 | 0 | 0 | 1 | 0 | 0 | 1 | 4 | 10 | 1 |
WP: Mariano Rivera (1–0) LP: Rod Beck (0–1); Home runs: BOS: None; NYY: Scott Brosius (1), Bernie Williams (1); Attendance: 57,181; Boxscore

Before the 1999 ALCS, Yogi Berra famously took Bernie Williams aside, smiled, and offered a word of advice for Williams, who was admittedly nervous before the start of the series between the two rivals: "Relax. We’ve been beating these guys for 80 years."

Game 1 was a matchup between Kent Mercker and Orlando Hernández. Hernández, the soon-to-be-named ALCS MVP, got into trouble in the first two innings. In the first, after a leadoff single by José Offerman, John Valentin reached on an error by Derek Jeter, scoring Offerman for the first run of the game. Valentin then scored on Brian Daubach's single to right. It looked like the Red Sox were ready to clobber the Yankees, but no more runs would score in the inning. In the top of the second, Darren Lewis scored on an infield hit to give Boston a 3-0 lead, but the Yankees' resilience showed itself in the bottom of the inning. With Shane Spencer on first with two out, Scott Brosius slugged a home run to make it a one-run game. The duel continued into the seventh when, with Derek Lowe pitching, Brosius singled to lead off the inning. A sacrifice bunt by Chuck Knoblauch moved him into scoring position. Jeter singled to center driving in Brosius to tie the game, but the score would remain knotted after nine full innings.

In the top of the 10th, with the Red Sox batting order turned over and Yankees closer Mariano Rivera on in relief, a controversial umpiring call thwarted a potential Boston rally. After Jose Offerman led off with a single, John Valentin then hit a hard ground ball which was fielded by Scott Brosius, who threw to second to attempt a 6-4-3 double play; however, the error-prone Chuck Knoblauch appeared to have the ball bounce out of his glove. Despite video replays confirming that Knoblauch dropped the throw from Brosius, umpire Rick Reed ruled that the ball was dropped on the transfer, and called Offerman out. The next batter, Brian Daubach, grounded into a double play and the side was retired.

In the bottom half of the 10th, Rod Beck came on in relief for the Red Sox and promptly gave up a leadoff homer to Bernie Williams win the game for the Yankees. The Yankees took a 1-0 lead in the series.

=== Game 2 ===
October 14, 1999 8:17 pm (EDT) at Yankee Stadium (I) in Bronx, New York 50 °F (10 °C), clear
| Team | 1 | 2 | 3 | 4 | 5 | 6 | 7 | 8 | 9 | R | H | E |
|---|---|---|---|---|---|---|---|---|---|---|---|---|
| Boston | 0 | 0 | 0 | 0 | 2 | 0 | 0 | 0 | 0 | 2 | 10 | 0 |
| New York | 0 | 0 | 0 | 1 | 0 | 0 | 2 | 0 | X | 3 | 7 | 0 |
WP: David Cone (1–0) LP: Ramón Martínez (0–1) Sv: Mariano Rivera (1); Home runs: BOS: Nomar Garciaparra (1); NYY: Tino Martinez (1); Attendance: 57,180; Boxscore

Game 2 pitted Ramón Martínez against David Cone. After grabbing a 1–0 lead behind a solo home run in the fourth inning by Tino Martinez, the Red Sox responded in the fifth inning when Jose Offerman hit a leadoff single and two outs later, Nomar Garciaparra homered to put them up 2−1. In the seventh inning, Ricky Ledee drew a leadoff walk, moved to second on a sacrifice bunt, and scored on Chuck Knoblauch's double to tie the game. Tom Gordon relieved Martinez and walked Derek Jeter, then Rhéal Cormier relieved Gordon and allowed a single to Paul O'Neill put the Yankees ahead 3−2. The lead would stand and Mariano Rivera, who won Game 1, got the save in the ninth inning to put the Yankees up two games going to Fenway Park.

=== Game 3 ===
October 16, 1999 4:22 pm (EDT) at Fenway Park in Boston, Massachusetts 73 °F (23 °C), sunny
| Team | 1 | 2 | 3 | 4 | 5 | 6 | 7 | 8 | 9 | R | H | E |
|---|---|---|---|---|---|---|---|---|---|---|---|---|
| New York | 0 | 0 | 0 | 0 | 0 | 0 | 0 | 1 | 0 | 1 | 3 | 3 |
| Boston | 2 | 2 | 2 | 0 | 2 | 1 | 4 | 0 | X | 13 | 21 | 1 |
WP: Pedro Martínez (1–0) LP: Roger Clemens (0–1); Home runs: NYY: Scott Brosius (2); BOS: John Valentin (1), Brian Daubach (1), Nomar Garciaparra (2); Attendance: 33,190; Boxscore

Game 3 was the long anticipated matchup between Pedro Martínez and Roger Clemens, but the Red Sox would come out swinging, scoring in all but two innings. After a leadoff triple by Jose Offerman in the first, John Valentin homered to put the Red Sox ahead 2–0. Next inning, Clemens allowed a one-out double to Trot Nixon and subsequent single to Offerman before Valentin's groundout scored Nixon. After Jason Varitek walked, Nomar Garciaparra's double scored Offerman to make it 4−0. Clemens was done in the third inning after allowing a leadoff single to Mike Stanley as Red Sox fans chanted "Where is Roger?" and then a response chant of "In the Shower". Hideki Irabu fared worse in relief as Brian Daubach's home run made it 6−0. Daubach and Darren Lewis hit back-to-back leadoff doubles in the fifth and the latter scored on Offerman's single two outs later to make it 8−0. Next inning, Yankees left fielder Ricky Ledee's error on Daubach's fly ball allowed Troy O'Leary to score all the way from first. In the seventh, Nixon hit a leadoff single, moved to second on a groundout, and scored on Valetin's single. One out later, Garciaparra's home run made it 12−0. O'Leary then doubled to left and scored Boston's last run on Stanley's single. Martinez, for his part, pitched brilliantly, striking out 12 Yankees in seven scoreless innings and allowing just two hits. He would finish 1999 with a streak of 17 scoreless innings in the playoffs. The Yankees scored their only run on Scott Brosius's home run off of Tom Gordon in the eighth. The Red Sox would go on to win 13–1 and make the series two games to one. Boston's victory also snapped a 10-game losing streak in LCS games dating back to 1988 which remains the longest such streak in MLB history to this day.

=== Game 4 ===
October 17, 1999 7:50 pm (EDT) at Fenway Park in Boston, Massachusetts 72 °F (22 °C), cloudy
| Team | 1 | 2 | 3 | 4 | 5 | 6 | 7 | 8 | 9 | R | H | E |
|---|---|---|---|---|---|---|---|---|---|---|---|---|
| New York | 0 | 1 | 0 | 2 | 0 | 0 | 0 | 0 | 6 | 9 | 11 | 0 |
| Boston | 0 | 1 | 1 | 0 | 0 | 0 | 0 | 0 | 0 | 2 | 10 | 4 |
WP: Andy Pettitte (1–0) LP: Bret Saberhagen (0–1) Sv: Mariano Rivera (2); Home runs: NYY: Darryl Strawberry (1), Ricky Ledée (1); BOS: None; Attendance: 33,586; Boxscore

Game 4 pitted Andy Pettitte against Bret Saberhagen, and just as they had in Game 1, the Red Sox would once again find themselves at odds with the umpire crew over some questionable calls. The Yankees struck first in the top of the 2nd, when Darryl Strawberry, in his first at-bat, hit a home run to silence the crowd chants of "Darryl! Darryl!" and "Just say no!" The Red Sox tied it in the bottom half when Butch Huskey doubled with one out and scored on Troy O'Leary's single. In the bottom of the third, Damon Buford hit a one-out single, stole second and scored on Jose Offerman's single to put the Red Sox ahead 2–1. However, those were the only runs Pettitte allowed in 7 1/3 strong innings. In the fourth, Bernie Williams singled with one out, reaching second on an error, before scoring on Tino Martinez's double to tie the game. After Darryl Strawberry was intentionally walked and Scott Brosius struck out, another error on Chad Curtis's ground ball allowed Martinez to score to put the Yankees up 3−2. That was all the runs allowed by Saberhagen in six innings. The score remained the same until the Yankees blew the game open with six runs in the ninth off the Boston bullpen. Chuck Knoblauch and Derek Jeter hit back-to-back one out singles off of Rich Garces, then an errant throw on Paul O'Neill's ground ball allowed Knoblauch to score. Williams's single scored Jeter before Martinez was intentionally walked. Rod Beck relieved Garces and allowed a grand slam to Ricky Ledée to cap the scoring at 9−2. The Yankees were one win away from the World Series.

This game featured the infamous trash throwing incident by fans when Jimy Williams was ejected from the game after arguing when Nomar Garciaparra was called out at first in the ninth inning. This followed a blown call by umpire Tim Tschida on Chuck Knoblauch's tag attempt on José Offerman in the eighth inning. The blown call is now famously referred to as "The Phantom Tag".

=== Game 5 ===
October 18, 1999 8:17 pm (EDT) at Fenway Park in Boston, Massachusetts 49 °F (9 °C), clear
| Team | 1 | 2 | 3 | 4 | 5 | 6 | 7 | 8 | 9 | R | H | E |
|---|---|---|---|---|---|---|---|---|---|---|---|---|
| New York | 2 | 0 | 0 | 0 | 0 | 0 | 2 | 0 | 2 | 6 | 11 | 1 |
| Boston | 0 | 0 | 0 | 0 | 0 | 0 | 0 | 1 | 0 | 1 | 5 | 2 |
WP: Orlando Hernández (1–0) LP: Kent Mercker (0–1) Sv: Ramiro Mendoza (1); Home runs: NYY: Derek Jeter (1), Jorge Posada (1); BOS: Jason Varitek (1); Attendance: 33,589; Boxscore

Game 5 was a rematch between Mercker and Hernández. Chuck Knoblauch singled to lead off the first and Jeter followed with a home run to put the Yankees up for good. They added to their lead in the seventh when Jeter reached second on an error and moved to third on Paul O'Neill's single off of Derek Lowe. Rhéal Cormier walked Bernie Williams to load the bases and another error on Chili Davis's ground ball allowed Jeter to score before Tino Martinez's RBI single made it 4−0 Yankees. El Duque kept the Red Sox in check, allowing only one run on a homer by Jason Varitek in the eighth. The Yankees added insurance in the ninth on Jorge Posada's two-run home run off of Tom Gordon. Both teams left eleven men on base and the Yankees would go on to win the pennant.

== Composite box ==
1999 ALCS (4–1): New York Yankees over Boston Red Sox

| Team | 1 | 2 | 3 | 4 | 5 | 6 | 7 | 8 | 9 | 10 | R | H | E |
|---|---|---|---|---|---|---|---|---|---|---|---|---|---|
| New York Yankees | 2 | 3 | 0 | 3 | 0 | 0 | 5 | 1 | 8 | 1 | 23 | 42 | 5 |
| Boston Red Sox | 4 | 4 | 3 | 0 | 4 | 1 | 4 | 1 | 0 | 0 | 21 | 54 | 10 |
Total attendance: 214,726 Average attendance: 42,945

== Aftermath ==
In quite possibly the climax season of the Yankees dynasty, they swept the Braves in the World Series, winning their third World Series in four seasons. Their game three blow out loss to the Red Sox in this series was their only loss of the entire 1999 postseason. The only other team to match the 1999 Yankees one loss record in a single postseason in the Wild Card era was the 2005 Chicago White Sox, who also won 11 games and lost once. The Yankees would win another World Series in 2000, making it four championships in five seasons.

After the season, Pedro Martinez was beaten out for the 1999 American League Most Valuable Player Award by Rangers’ catcher Ivan Rodriguez due to being left off the ballot of two voters completely by Minneapolis’ LaVelle Neal and New York’s George King. In both their explanations, Neal and King believed that starting pitchers should not be considered for the Most Valuable Player as they only pitched once every 4–5 days. However, in King’s case, his point proved be contradictory. In the previous season, King had put two starting pitchers on his MVP ballot, the Yankees’ David Wells and the Texas Rangers’ Rick Helling. In addition, King’s vote for Helling was the only vote Helling received for the MVP, as he went 20–7 with a 4.41 ERA, 1.37 WHIP and 162 strikeouts, a much inferior pitching stat line compared to Martinez's 1999 season. King later noted that he had a talk with friend after the 1998 MVP who convinced him that his earlier MVP votes were off base and that he should no longer vote for pitchers.

Nevertheless, Pedro was spectacular in 1999, pitching to a 2.07 ERA to go with 313 strikeouts in 213 innings pitched. He pitched even better in 2000, but only placed 5th in MVP voting that season. His 1999–2000 seasons are widely considered two of the best pitched seasons in the modern era. Justin Verlander in 2011 was the first pitcher to win a MVP since Roger Clemens in 1986. Three years later, Clayton Kershaw became the first pitcher in the National League to win the MVP since Bob Gibson in 1968. A pure pitcher has not won the MVP since Kershaw in 2014 — Shohei Ohtani, a two-way player, has won it four times.

In the 2003 American League Championship Series, the Yankees beat the Red Sox on a game seven walk-off home run by Aaron Boone home run in the 11th inning. Boone's unlikely home run was seen as reminiscent to Bucky Dent's home run in 1978 against the Red Sox. The following season, in the 2004 American League Championship Series between the two rivals, the Red Sox would break through in dramatic fashion, becoming the first team in baseball history to comeback from a 3–0 deficit to win a postseason series. Boston went on to finish the job, sweeping the Cardinals and winning their first World Series since 1918.

The Red Sox and Yankees have played four more times in the postseason since 2004, with Boston winning the 2018 American League Division Series and the 2021 American League Wild Card Game and the Yankees winning the 2025 and 2026 American League Wild Card Series.
