= 2010 Major League Baseball postseason =

2010 Major League Baseball playoffs

Tournament details
- Dates: October 6 – November 1, 2010
- Teams: 8

Final positions
- Champions: San Francisco Giants (6th title)
- Runners-up: Texas Rangers

Tournament statistics
- Most HRs: Nelson Cruz (TEX) (6)
- Most SBs: Elvis Andrus (TEX) (8)
- Most Ks (as pitcher): Cliff Lee (TEX) (47)

Awards
- MVP: Édgar Rentería (SF)

The 2010 Major League Baseball postseason was the playoff tournament of Major League Baseball for the 2010 season. The winners of the Division Series would move on to the League Championship Series to determine the pennant winners that face each other in the World Series.

In the American League, the New York Yankees returned for the fifteenth time in the past sixteen years, the Minnesota Twins returned for the sixth time in the past nine years, the Tampa Bay Rays returned for the second time in three years, and the Texas Rangers returned for the first time since 1999. This would be the first of three consecutive postseason appearances for the Rangers.

In the National League, the Philadelphia Phillies returned to the postseason for the fourth straight time, the San Francisco Giants made their first postseason appearance since 2003, the Atlanta Braves returned for the fifteenth time in the last nineteen years, and the Cincinnati Reds made their first postseason appearance since 1995.

The postseason began on October 6, 2010, and ended on November 1, 2010, with the Giants defeating the Rangers in five games in the 2010 World Series, ending the Curse of Coogan's Bluff. It was the Giants' sixth championship in franchise history, and their first title since 1954, when the team was still based in New York City.

== Playoff seeds ==
American League Teams National League Teams

The following teams qualified for the postseason:

=== American League ===
1. Tampa Bay Rays – 96–66, AL East champions
2. Minnesota Twins – 94–68, AL Central champions
3. Texas Rangers – 90–72, AL West champions
4. New York Yankees – 95–67

=== National League ===
1. Philadelphia Phillies – 97–65, NL East champions
2. San Francisco Giants – 92–70, NL West champions
3. Cincinnati Reds – 91–71, NL Central champions
4. Atlanta Braves – 91–71

== Playoff bracket ==
Division Series (ALDS, NLDS)
1	Tampa Bay	2
3	Texas	3
American League
2	Minnesota	0
4	NY Yankees	3
1	Philadelphia	3
3	Cincinnati	0
National League
2	San Francisco	3
4	Atlanta	1

League Championship Series (ALCS, NLCS)
3	Texas	4
4	NY Yankees	2
1	Philadelphia	2
2	San Francisco	4

World Series
AL3	Texas	1
NL2	San Francisco	4

Note: Two teams in the same division could not meet in the division series.

== American League Division Series ==
=== (1) Tampa Bay Rays vs. (3) Texas Rangers ===
Texas won the series, 3–2.

Game	Date	Score	Location	Time	Attendance
1	October 6	Texas Rangers – 5, Tampa Bay Rays – 1	Tropicana Field	3:06	35,474
2	October 7	Texas Rangers – 6, Tampa Bay Rays – 0	Tropicana Field	3:10	35,535
3	October 9	Tampa Bay Rays – 6, Texas Rangers – 3	Rangers Ballpark in Arlington	3:38	51,746
4	October 10	Tampa Bay Rays – 5, Texas Rangers – 2	Rangers Ballpark in Arlington	3:22	49,218
5	October 12	Texas Rangers – 5, Tampa Bay Rays – 1	Tropicana Field	3:00	41,845

This was the first postseason meeting between the Rays and Rangers. In the first postseason series where neither team won a home game, the Rangers defeated the Rays in five games to advance to the ALCS for the first time in franchise history.

Cliff Lee pitched seven solid innings as the Rangers stole Game 1 on the road, snapping a nine-game playoff losing streak dating back to Game 2 of the ALDS in 1996. In Game 2, C. J. Wilson pitched six innings of shutout ball and the Rangers bullpen blanked the Rays as they took a 2–0 series lead headed to Arlington. In Game 3, with the Rangers leading 2-1 and six outs away from advancing, consecutive RBI singles by Carlos Peña and John Jaso would put the Rays in the lead for good, and Peña added more insurance runs in the top of the ninth with a two-run homer. Peña got the scoring started for the Rays in Game 4 as they jumped out to an early lead they wouldn’t relinquish as they won 5-2 to force a decisive fifth game back in St. Petersburg. However, the Rangers survived as Lee pitched a six-hit complete game with the Rangers winning 5-1, winning their first playoff series in franchise history.

The Rays and Rangers met again in the ALDS the next year, and in the Wild Card round in 2023, both of which were won by the Rangers.

=== (2) Minnesota Twins vs. (4) New York Yankees ===
New York won the series, 3–0.

Game	Date	Score	Location	Time	Attendance
1	October 6	New York Yankees – 6, Minnesota Twins – 4	Target Field	3:47	42,032
2	October 7	New York Yankees – 5, Minnesota Twins – 2	Target Field	2:59	42,035
3	October 9	Minnesota Twins – 1, New York Yankees – 6	Yankee Stadium	3:06	50,840

This was the fourth postseason meeting between the Yankees and Twins (2003, 2004, 2009). The Yankees once again swept the Twins to advance to the ALCS for the second year in a row.

Mark Teixeira completed a comeback effort by the Yankees with a two-run homer in the top of the seventh as they stole Game 1 on the road. In Game 2, Andy Pettitte helped lead the Yankees to victory with seven strong innings in what would be his nineteenth and final postseason win as the Yankees took a 2–0 series lead headed to the Bronx. Phil Hughes and the Yankees bullpen held the Twins to one run scored to complete the sweep in Game 3.

Both teams would meet again in the Wild Card game in 2017, and the ALDS again in 2019, both of which were won by the Yankees.

== National League Division Series ==
=== (1) Philadelphia Phillies vs. (3) Cincinnati Reds ===
Philadelphia won the series, 3–0.

Game	Date	Score	Location	Time	Attendance
1	October 6	Cincinnati Reds – 0, Philadelphia Phillies – 4^{†}	Citizens Bank Park	2:34	46,411
2	October 8	Cincinnati Reds – 4, Philadelphia Phillies – 7	Citizens Bank Park	3:39	46,511
3	October 10	Philadelphia Phillies – 2, Cincinnati Reds – 0	Great American Ball Park	3:00	44,599

†: No-hitter by Roy Halladay

This was the second postseason meeting between the Reds and Phillies. They last met in the NLCS in 1976, which the Reds won in a sweep en route to winning back-to-back World Series titles. This time, the Phillies returned the favor, sweeping the Reds to advance to the NLCS for the third year in a row.

This series was notable for a no-hitter thrown by Roy Halladay in Game 1, the first no-hitter in the postseason since Don Larsen's perfect game in the 1956 World Series. In Game 2, the Reds held a 4–0 lead, but the Phillies would rally with seven unanswered runs across the bottom the fifth, sixth, seventh, and eighth respectively to win and take a 2–0 series lead headed to Cincinnati. Cole Hamels pitched a five-hit complete-game shutout for the Phillies in Game 3 to complete the sweep.

This was the last playoff series won by the Phillies until 2022, and the last time a no-hitter was thrown in the postseason until the 2022 World Series (which the Phillies, ironically, would be on the receiving end of).

=== (2) San Francisco Giants vs. (4) Atlanta Braves ===
San Francisco won the series, 3–1.

Game	Date	Score	Location	Time	Attendance
1	October 7	Atlanta Braves – 0, San Francisco Giants – 1	AT&T Park	2:26	43,936
2	October 8	Atlanta Braves – 5, San Francisco Giants – 4 (11)	AT&T Park	3:47	44,046
3	October 10	San Francisco Giants – 3, Atlanta Braves – 2	Turner Field	3:23	53,284
4	October 11	San Francisco Giants – 3, Atlanta Braves – 2	Turner Field	2:56	44,532

This was the second postseason meeting between the Giants and Braves. They last met in the NLDS in 2002, which the Giants won in five games before falling in the World Series. The Giants defeated the Braves in four games to return to the NLCS for the first time since 2002.

Tim Lincecum pitched a two-hit complete-game shutout as the Giants took Game 1. Game 2 was a long extra-innings grind that would be won by the Braves as Rick Ankiel hit a go-ahead solo homer in the top of the eleventh to even the series headed to Atlanta. In Game 3, the Braves led 2-1 and were two outs away from taking the series lead, but the Giants rallied to take the lead for good, and Giants’ closer Brian Wilson earned his first postseason save in the bottom of the ninth. Giants' rookie pitcher Madison Bumgarner helped close out the series in Game 4 in what would be his first of many postseason wins.

== American League Championship Series ==
=== (3) Texas Rangers vs. (4) New York Yankees ===
Texas won the series, 4–2.

Game	Date	Score	Location	Time	Attendance
1	October 15	New York Yankees – 6, Texas Rangers – 5	Rangers Ballpark in Arlington	3:50	50,930
2	October 16	New York Yankees – 2, Texas Rangers – 7	Rangers Ballpark in Arlington	3:52	50,362
3	October 18	Texas Rangers – 8, New York Yankees – 0	Yankee Stadium	3:18	49,480
4	October 19	Texas Rangers – 10, New York Yankees – 3	Yankee Stadium	4:05	49,977
5	October 20	Texas Rangers – 2, New York Yankees – 7	Yankee Stadium	3:48	49,832
6	October 22	New York Yankees – 1, Texas Rangers – 6	Rangers Ballpark in Arlington	2:57	51,404

This was the fourth postseason meeting between the Rangers and Yankees (1996, 1998, 1999), and their first postseason meeting outside of the ALDS. All three previous meetings were won by the Yankees. This time, the Rangers returned the favor, defeating the defending World Series champion Yankees in six games to advance to the World Series for the first time in franchise history (in the process denying a rematch of the 1962 World Series between the Yankees and Giants).

An RBI single from Marcus Thames would give the Yankees a narrow victory in Game 1. In Game 2, the Rangers blew out the Yankees to even the series, winning their first home postseason game in franchise history. When the series moved to the Bronx, things quickly got ugly for the Yankees, as the Rangers’ offense overwhelmed the Yankees’ pitching staff in back-to-back blowout wins in Games 3 and 4 to take a commanding 3–1 series lead. CC Sabathia and the Yankees' bullpen helped send the series back to Arlington with a blowout victory in Game 5. In Game 6, with the game tied at one going into the bottom of the fifth, Vladimir Guerrero and Nelson Cruz put the Rangers in the lead for good with a four-run fifth, effectively securing the pennant and exacting long-awaited revenge on the team that eliminated them in their first three postseason appearances.

The Rangers would win the pennant again the next year against the Detroit Tigers in six games before falling in the World Series.

This was the first of five consecutive losses in the ALCS for the Yankees across a twelve-year span. They made it back two years later, only to be swept by the Detroit Tigers. They then returned in 2017, 2019, and 2022, and lost all three to the Houston Astros.

== National League Championship Series ==
=== (1) Philadelphia Phillies vs. (2) San Francisco Giants ===
San Francisco won the series, 4–2.

Game	Date	Score	Location	Time	Attendance
1	October 16	San Francisco Giants – 4, Philadelphia Phillies – 3	Citizens Bank Park	2:59	45,929
2	October 17	San Francisco Giants – 1, Philadelphia Phillies – 6	Citizens Bank Park	3:01	46,099
3	October 19	Philadelphia Phillies – 0, San Francisco Giants – 3	AT&T Park	2:39	43,320
4	October 20	Philadelphia Phillies – 5, San Francisco Giants – 6	AT&T Park	3:40	43,515
5	October 21	Philadelphia Phillies – 4, San Francisco Giants – 2	AT&T Park	3:15	43,713
6	October 23	San Francisco Giants – 3, Philadelphia Phillies – 2	Citizens Bank Park	3:41	46,062

The Giants upset the two-time defending National League champion Phillies in six games to return to the World Series for the first time since 2002.

Tim Lincecum pitched seven solid innings and Cody Ross homered twice as the Giants stole Game 1 on the road in surprising fashion. Roy Oswalt pitched eight solid innings as the Phillies won Game 2 to even the series headed to San Francisco. Matt Cain pitched seven innings of shutout ball and Brian Wilson earned his fourth postseason save as the Giants shutout the Phillies in Game 3. Game 4 was an offensive shootout that was won by the Giants as they took a 3–1 series lead, with Wilson earning his first postseason victory. In Game 5, the Giants took an early lead, but the Phillies put up three runs in the top of the third to take the lead for good and send the series back to Philadelphia. In Game 6, the Phillies jumped out to an early 2–0 lead in the bottom of the first, however the Giants tied the game with a two-run third inning thanks to an RBI single from Aubrey Huff and a throwing error by Philadelphia’s Plácido Polanco. No team scored a run until the top of the eighth, when San Francisco's Juan Uribe hit a solo home run to put the Giants in the lead for good. Wilson then struck out Ryan Howard looking in the bottom of the ninth to clinch the pennant for the Giants, earning his fifth save.

This was the first of three NL pennants won by the Giants during the 2010s over the course of five years. They would win it again in 2012 and 2014 over the St. Louis Cardinals in seven and five games respectively en route to World Series titles.

The Phillies would return to the NLCS in 2022, and defeated the San Diego Padres in five games for their most recent pennant before falling in the World Series.

== 2010 World Series ==
=== (AL3) Texas Rangers vs. (NL2) San Francisco Giants ===
San Francisco won the series, 4–1.

Game	Date	Score	Location	Time	Attendance
1	October 27	Texas Rangers – 7, San Francisco Giants – 11	AT&T Park	3:36	43,601
2	October 28	Texas Rangers – 0, San Francisco Giants – 9	AT&T Park	3:17	43,622
3	October 30	San Francisco Giants – 2, Texas Rangers – 4	Rangers Ballpark in Arlington	2:51	52,419
4	October 31	San Francisco Giants – 4, Texas Rangers – 0	Rangers Ballpark in Arlington	3:09	51,920
5	November 1	San Francisco Giants – 3, Texas Rangers – 1	Rangers Ballpark in Arlington	2:32	52,045

The Giants defeated the Rangers in five games to win their first World Series title since 1954, when the team was still based in New York City, marking the end of the Curse of Coogan's Bluff.

Game 1 was a massive back-and-forth slugfest that was won by the Giants as they chased Cliff Lee from the mound. In Game 2, Matt Cain pitched seven innings of shutout ball as the Giants blew out the Rangers to take a 2–0 series lead headed to Arlington. In Game 3, a three-run homer by Mitch Moreland gave the Rangers a lead they wouldn’t relinquish as they won their first World Series game by a 4-2 score. In Game 4, Madison Bumgarner won his first World Series game with eight innings of shutout ball as the Giants shutout the Rangers to take a 3–1 series lead. Bumgarner became the fifth-youngest pitcher to start a World Series game, and was the fourth-youngest to win one. In Game 5, Tim Lincecum pitched eight solid innings, Édgar Rentería gave the Giants a lead they wouldn’t let go of with a three-run homer in the top of the seventh, and Brian Wilson earned his sixth postseason save as the Giants prevailed to end their championship drought.

This was the first championship won by a team from the San Francisco Bay Area since 1995, when the San Francisco 49ers won Super Bowl XXIX. It was also the first World Series title for the Bay Area since 1989, which was won by the Oakland Athletics, who swept the Giants that year. The victory marked the start of a dynasty of three championships in five years for the Giants. They returned to the World Series two years later, and swept the Detroit Tigers for the second championship of the dynasty.

The Rangers would return to the World Series the next year, but fell to the St. Louis Cardinals in seven games after being a strike away from the championship twice in Game 6. They would eventually win the championship in 2023 over the Arizona Diamondbacks in five games.

== Broadcasting ==
This was the fourth postseason under a seven-year U.S. rights agreement with Fox and TBS. TBS primarily aired all Division Series games, with sister network TNT used as an overflow channel. TBS also had the American League Championship Series. Fox televised the National League Championship Series and the World Series.
