= 1969 Major League Baseball postseason =

Inaugural edition of the Major League Baseball playoffs

Tournament details
- Dates: October 4–16, 1969
- Teams: 4

Final positions
- Champions: New York Mets (1st title)
- Runners-up: Baltimore Orioles

Tournament statistics
- Games played: 11
- Attendance: 540,728 (49,157 per game)
- Best BA: Boog Powell (BAL) (.313 (Note: To qualify for the leaderboard, a batter must have had a minimum of 20 plate appearances or 9 bases on balls in the 1969 postseason.))
- Most HRs: Hank Aaron (ATL), Tommie Agee & Donn Clendenon (NYM) (3)
- Most SBs: Tommie Agee (NYM) (3)
- Best ERA: Mike Cuellar (BAL) (1.50 (Note: To qualify for the leaderboard, a pitcher must have had a minimum of 15 innings pitched or 3 games started in the 1969 postseason.))
- Most Ks (as pitcher): Dave McNally (BAL) (24)

Awards
- MVP: Donn Clendenon (NYM)

The 1969 Major League Baseball postseason was the playoff tournament of Major League Baseball for the 1969 season. It was the first edition of the new playoff system introduced by MLB, coinciding with the beginning of the "Divisional Era." Each league expanded from 10 teams to 12 teams and was divided into two 6-team divisions. The 162-game schedule stayed in place, but now each team played the other 5 teams in its own division 18 times each (90 games) and the 6 teams in its league's other division 12 times each (72 games). The winners of each division advanced to the postseason and faced each other in a League Championship Series to determine the pennant winners that would face each other in the World Series.

In the inaugural edition of the MLB postseason, the American League teams included the Baltimore Orioles, who were making their second postseason appearance in the past four years, and the Minnesota Twins, who were making their second postseason appearance in the last five seasons. This was the first of two consecutive postseason appearances for both the Orioles and Twins.

In the National League, the New York Mets ended a streak of many losing seasons and made their first postseason appearance in franchise history, becoming the first expansion team to accomplish such a feat. The Atlanta Braves also made their first postseason appearance since 1958, when the team was based out of Milwaukee, marking the first playoff appearance by an Atlanta-based team in any of the four major leagues. This was Atlanta’s last postseason appearance until 1982.

This was the last time until 1979 where neither team from the previous year’s World Series appeared in the postseason.

The postseason began on October 4, 1969, two days after the end of the 1969 Major League Baseball season, and concluded on October 16, 1969, with the Mets upsetting the 109-win Orioles in five games in the 1969 World Series, to win their first ever World Series title.

== Teams ==
American League Teams National League Teams

The American and National leagues were split into two divisions per league. With the exception of 1981, until the addition of the wild card in 1995 only the two division winners in each league could qualify for the postseason.

The following teams qualified for the postseason:

=== American League ===
- Baltimore Orioles – 109–53, AL East champions
- Minnesota Twins – 97–65, AL West champions

=== National League ===
- New York Mets – 100–62, NL East champions
- Atlanta Braves – 93–69, NL West champions

== Playoff bracket ==
League Championship Series (ALCS, NLCS)
East	Baltimore	3
West	Minnesota	0
East	NY Mets	3
West	Atlanta	0

World Series
AL	Baltimore	1
NL	NY Mets	4

== American League Championship Series ==
=== Minnesota Twins vs. Baltimore Orioles ===
Baltimore won the series, 3–0.

Game	Date	Score	Location	Time	Attendance
1	October 4	Minnesota Twins – 3, Baltimore Orioles – 4 (12)	Memorial Stadium	3:29	39,324
2	October 5	Minnesota Twins – 0, Baltimore Orioles – 1 (11)	Memorial Stadium	3:17	41,704
3	October 6	Baltimore Orioles – 11, Minnesota Twins – 2	Metropolitan Stadium	2:48	32,735

This was the first postseason meeting between the Twins and Orioles, and the first of thirteen straight ALCS series to feature either the Orioles, Oakland Athletics or Kansas City Royals. The Orioles swept the Twins to advance to the World Series for the second time in four years.

In the very first LCS game ever played, the Orioles took the first win in the series thanks to a sacrifice bunt from Paul Blair which drove in Mark Belanger in the bottom of the twelfth. In Game 2, Dave McNally set a postseason record for the longest complete game shutout by pitching eleven shutout innings as the Orioles won 1–0 to take a 2–0 series lead headed to Bloomington, after Curt Motton hit a walk-off pinch hit RBI single in the bottom of the eleventh. In Game 3, Jim Palmer pitched another complete game as the Orioles blew out the Twins to secure the pennant.

This was the first of three straight pennants won by the Orioles. The next year, the Orioles swept the Twins again to capture the pennant and then a World Series title, and in 1971 the Orioles swept the Oakland Athletics for their third straight pennant before falling in the World Series.

== National League Championship Series ==
=== New York Mets vs. Atlanta Braves ===
New York won the series, 3–0.

Game	Date	Score	Location	Time	Attendance
1	October 4	New York Mets – 9, Atlanta Braves – 5	Atlanta–Fulton County Stadium	2:37	50,122
2	October 5	New York Mets – 11, Atlanta Braves – 6	Atlanta-Fulton County Stadium	3:10	50,270
3	October 6	Atlanta Braves – 4, New York Mets – 7	Shea Stadium	2:24	54,195

This was the first postseason meeting in the history of the Braves-Mets rivalry, and the first postseason series ever played in the Deep South. The Mets swept the Braves to advance to their first World Series in franchise history.

In Atlanta for Game 1, the Braves held a 5–4 lead after seven innings. However, the Mets rallied with five unanswered runs in the top of the eighth to steal the first ever NLCS game on the road. Game 2 was an offensive slugfest that was won by the Mets as Ken Boswell, Tommie Agee, and Cleon Jones helped pad the Mets’ lead with a trio of two-run home runs despite the Braves best attempts to rally. When the series shifted to Queens, Nolan Ryan helped lead the Mets' to the pennant in Game 3 with a solid seven-inning performance, winning his first postseason game. Game 3 would ultimately be Hank Aaron’s final postseason game.

The Mets would win their next pennant in 1973 in an upset over the Cincinnati Reds in five games before coming up short in the World Series.

The Braves would return to the NLCS in 1982, but were swept by the eventual World Series champion St. Louis Cardinals. They would eventually win the pennant again in 1991 over the Pittsburgh Pirates in seven games before falling in the World Series.

Both teams would meet again three decades later in the NLCS in 1999, where the Braves returned the favor and defeated the Mets in six games before falling in the World Series.

== 1969 World Series ==
=== Baltimore Orioles (AL) vs. New York Mets (NL) ===
New York won the series, 4–1.

Game	Date	Score	Location	Time	Attendance
1	October 11	New York Mets – 1, Baltimore Orioles – 4	Memorial Stadium	2:13	50,429
2	October 12	New York Mets – 2, Baltimore Orioles – 1	Memorial Stadium	2:20	50,850
3	October 14	Baltimore Orioles – 0, New York Mets – 5	Shea Stadium	2:23	56,335
4	October 15	Baltimore Orioles – 1, New York Mets – 2 (10)	Shea Stadium	2:33	57,367
5	October 16	Baltimore Orioles – 3, New York Mets – 5	Shea Stadium	2:14	57,397

This was the fourth meeting between teams from Baltimore and New York City for a major professional sports championship, which previously occurred in the 1958 and 1959 NFL Championship Games, and Super Bowl III earlier in the year (in which the New York Jets famously upset the Baltimore Colts). Considered by many to be one of the biggest upsets in World Series history, the Mets shocked the 109-win Orioles in five games to win their first championship in franchise history, becoming the first expansion team to win a World Series.

Mike Cuellar pitched a complete game as the Orioles took Game 1 by three runs. In Game 2, the Mets jumped out to an early lead thanks to a home run by Donn Clendenon, but the Orioles tied the game in the bottom of the seventh off an RBI single from Brooks Robinson. However, the Mets prevailed as an RBI single from Al Weis in the top of the ninth to put them in the lead for good, evening the series headed to Queens. In Game 3, the Mets shutout the Orioles to take the series lead for good, capped off by Nolan Ryan pitching the final 2 1/3 innings, earning Ryan a save in his only World Series appearance. In Game 4, Tom Seaver pitched a complete game through ten innings in a 2-1 Mets victory as an error by Orioles’ reliever Pete Richert allowed Rod Gaspar to score in the bottom of the tenth. In Game 5, the Orioles jumped out to an early 3–0 lead, however the Mets scored five unanswered runs across the sixth, seventh and eighth innings to take the lead for good, capped off by an RBI from Jerry Grote, which resulted in a rare double error by Baltimore’s Boog Powell and Eddie Watt. Jerry Koosman then silenced the Oriole bats in the top of the ninth to secure the title.

Along with the New York Jets winning Super Bowl III earlier in the year against the Baltimore Colts, the New York metropolitan area had both World Series and Super Bowl champions in the same season or calendar year. The Mets would return to the World Series in 1973 as even greater underdogs than in 1969, but they would fall to the Oakland Athletics in seven games, becoming the second victim of an Athletics three-peat from 1972 to 1974. They would eventually win the World Series again in 1986 against the Boston Red Sox in seven games after being a strike away from elimination twice in Game 6.

This was the first of three straight World Series appearances for the Orioles - the Orioles would redeem themselves the following year by defeating the Cincinnati Reds in five games to win their second title. They also made the World Series in 1971, but would fall to the Pittsburgh Pirates in seven games.

== Broadcasting ==
NBC televised all postseason games nationally in the United States. Each team's local broadcaster also televised coverage of LCS games.
