= 1991 Major League Baseball postseason =

1991 Major League Baseball playoffs

Tournament details
- Dates: October 8–27, 1991
- Teams: 4

Final positions
- Champions: Minnesota Twins (3rd title)
- Runners-up: Atlanta Braves

Tournament statistics
- Games played: 19
- Attendance: 1,006,590 (52,978 per game)
- Most HRs: Kirby Puckett (MIN) (4)
- Most SBs: Ron Gant (ATL) (8)
- Most Ks (as pitcher): John Smoltz (ATL) (26)

Awards
- MVP: Jack Morris (MIN)

The 1991 Major League Baseball postseason was the playoff tournament of Major League Baseball for the 1991 season. The winners of each division advanced to the postseason and faced each other in a League Championship Series to determine the pennant winners that faced each other in the World Series.

In the American League, the Minnesota Twins returned to the postseason for the second time in five years, and the Toronto Blue Jays returned for the third time in the past seven years. This was Minnesota’s last postseason appearance until 2002.

In the National League, the Pittsburgh Pirates made their second consecutive appearance, and the Atlanta Braves made their first postseason appearance since 1982. This marked the first of fourteen straight postseason appearances for the Braves franchise from 1991 to 2005 (excluding 1994, when the season was cancelled due to a strike), a streak that stood alone as a league record until it was matched by the Los Angeles Dodgers in 2026.

This was the first postseason since 1980 to not feature a team from California.

The playoffs began on October 8, 1991, and concluded on October 27, 1991, with the Twins defeating the Braves in seven games in the 1991 World Series. It was the Twins' second title in Minnesota and their third overall, and is the most recent professional sports championship won by a Minneapolis-St. Paul-based team.

== Playoff seeds ==
American League Teams National League Teams

The following teams qualified for the postseason:

=== American League ===
- Toronto Blue Jays – 91–71, AL East champions
- Minnesota Twins – 95–67, AL West champions

=== National League ===
- Pittsburgh Pirates – 98–64, NL East champions
- Atlanta Braves – 94–68, NL West champions

== Playoff bracket ==
League Championship Series (ALCS, NLCS)
East	Toronto	1
West	Minnesota	4
East	Pittsburgh	3
West	Atlanta	4

World Series
AL	Minnesota	4
NL	Atlanta	3

== American League Championship Series ==
=== Minnesota Twins vs. Toronto Blue Jays ===
Minnesota won the series, 4–1.

Game	Date	Score	Location	Time	Attendance
1	October 8	Toronto Blue Jays – 4, Minnesota Twins – 5	Hubert H. Humphrey Metrodome	3:17	54,766
2	October 9	Toronto Blue Jays – 5, Minnesota Twins – 2	Hubert H. Humphrey Metrodome	3:02	54,816
3	October 11	Minnesota Twins – 3, Toronto Blue Jays – 2 (10)	SkyDome	3:36	51,454
4	October 12	Minnesota Twins – 9, Toronto Blue Jays – 3	SkyDome	3:15	51,526
5	October 13	Minnesota Twins – 8, Toronto Blue Jays – 5	SkyDome	3:29	51,425

This was the first postseason meeting between the Twins and Blue Jays, and the first of fourteen consecutive ALCS series from 1991 to 2005 to feature either the Twins, Blue Jays, New York Yankees, Cleveland Indians, Seattle Mariners or Chicago White Sox (excluding 1994, when the season was canceled). The Twins defeated the Blue Jays in five games to return to the World Series for the second time in five years.

In Game 1, the Twins' bullpen held off a rally by the Blue Jays to win. Juan Guzmán and Twins relief pitcher Duane Ward helped the Blue Jays prevail by a 5–2 score in Game 2 to even the series headed home to Toronto. The Twins took Game 3 in extra innings thanks to a solo home run from Mike Pagliarulo in the top of the tenth. Jack Morris and Steve Bedrosian shut down the Blue Jays' offense in Game 4 as the Twins won in a blowout to take a 3–1 series lead. Game 5 was an offensive slugfest which was won by the Twins, as they overcame a 5–2 Blue Jays lead with six unanswered runs to clinch the pennant.

As of 2026, this is the last time the Twins won the AL pennant, and is the most recent conference championship won by a Minneapolis–St. Paul-based team. The Twins would eventually return to the ALCS in 2002, but lost to the eventual World Series champion Anaheim Angels in five games. The Twins currently hold the fourth longest pennant drought in the American League, and sixth longest pennant drought overall.

The Blue Jays returned to the ALCS the next year, defeating the Oakland Athletics in six games en route to their first World Series title.

Both teams would meet again in the Wild Card round in 2023, where the Twins swept the Blue Jays.

== National League Championship Series ==
=== Pittsburgh Pirates vs. Atlanta Braves ===
Atlanta won the series, 4–3.

Game	Date	Score	Location	Time	Attendance
1	October 9	Atlanta Braves – 1, Pittsburgh Pirates – 5	Three Rivers Stadium	2:51	57,347
2	October 10	Atlanta Braves – 1, Pittsburgh Pirates – 0	Three Rivers Stadium	2:46	57,533
3	October 12	Pittsburgh Pirates – 3, Atlanta Braves – 10	Atlanta–Fulton County Stadium	3:21	50,905
4	October 13	Pittsburgh Pirates – 3, Atlanta Braves – 2 (10)	Atlanta–Fulton County Stadium	3:43	51,109
5	October 14	Pittsburgh Pirates – 1, Atlanta Braves – 0	Atlanta–Fulton County Stadium	2:51	51,109
6	October 16	Atlanta Braves – 1, Pittsburgh Pirates – 0	Three Rivers Stadium	3:09	54,508
7	October 17	Atlanta Braves – 4, Pittsburgh Pirates – 0	Three Rivers Stadium	3:04	46,932

This was the first postseason meeting between the Braves and Pirates. It was also the first of eight straight appearances in the NLCS for the Braves, which ended in 1999 (excluding 1994, when the season was cancelled). The Braves defeated the Pirates in seven games to return to the World Series for the first time since 1958, when the team was still based in Milwaukee (in the process denying a rematch of the 1925 World Series between the Pirates and Twins (who were then known as the Washington Senators)).

Doug Drabek out-dueled Tom Glavine as the Pirates took Game 1 by a 5–1 score. The Braves evened the series in Game 2 with a 1–0 shutout victory, as Steve Avery out-dueled Zane Smith. Game 2 was the Braves’ first victory in a postseason game since Game 4 of the 1958 World Series. When the series shifted to Atlanta, John Smoltz pitched six solid innings as the Braves blew out the Pirates to take a 2–1 series lead. The Pirates evened the series in an extra-inning Game 4 as Mike LaValliere scored the winning run with an RBI single in the top of the tenth. In Game 5, Smith outdueled Glavine as the Pirates won 1–0 to take a 3–2 series lead headed back to Pittsburgh, now one win away from their first NL pennant in 12 years. Game 6 was another pitchers' duel, which featured Avery and Drabek. It would be won by the former as the Braves won 1–0 to force a seventh game. Smoltz pitched a complete-game shutout in Game 7 as the Braves won 4–0 to clinch the pennant. This was the first postseason series won by the Braves since the 1957 World Series.

This was the first of five NL pennants won by the Braves during the 1990s. They would win the pennant again the next year over the Pirates in seven games after being one out away from elimination in Game 7, but they fell in the World Series again.

== 1991 World Series ==
=== Minnesota Twins (AL) vs. Atlanta Braves (NL) ===
Minnesota won the series, 4–3.

Game	Date	Score	Location	Time	Attendance
1	October 19	Atlanta Braves – 2, Minnesota Twins – 5	Hubert H. Humphrey Metrodome	3:00	55,108
2	October 20	Atlanta Braves – 2, Minnesota Twins – 3	Hubert H. Humphrey Metrodome	2:37	55,145
3	October 22	Minnesota Twins – 4, Atlanta Braves – 5 (12)	Atlanta–Fulton County Stadium	4:04	50,878
4	October 23	Minnesota Twins – 2, Atlanta Braves – 3	Atlanta–Fulton County Stadium	2:57	50,878
5	October 24	Minnesota Twins – 5, Atlanta Braves – 14	Atlanta–Fulton County Stadium	2:59	50,878
6	October 26	Atlanta Braves – 3, Minnesota Twins – 4 (11)	Hubert H. Humphrey Metrodome	3:46	55,155
7	October 27	Atlanta Braves – 0, Minnesota Twins – 1 (10)	Hubert H. Humphrey Metrodome	3:23	55,118

This was the first World Series ever played in the Deep South. It was also the first World Series since 1987 to not feature a team from California, and where neither team won a road game. In what is considered to be one of the greatest World Series ever played, the Twins defeated the Braves in seven games to win their second title in five years.

This series was notable for several grueling contests, with five of its games decided by one run. Jack Morris pitched seven solid innings in Game 1 as the Twins won 5-2. In Game 2, the Twins jumped out to an early lead, but the Braves tied it thanks to a sacrifice fly from Rafael Belliard. In the bottom of the eighth, Scott Leius hit a solo home run to put the Twins ahead for good, giving them a 2-0 series lead headed to Atlanta. In the first World Series game played in the Deep South, the Braves prevailed in a grueling twelve-inning battle thanks to an RBI single from Mark Lemke that scored David Justice. Game 3 was also notable for Twins manager Tom Kelly running out of hitters. At four hours and four minutes, Game 3 was the longest game in World Series history until Game 3 of the 2005 World Series, which lasted five hours and 41 minutes. Lemke would again lead the Braves to victory in Game 4 after umpire Terry Tata called him safe in a controversial call in the bottom of the ninth. Tom Glavine pitched five solid innings as the Braves blew out the Twins in Game 5 to take a 3-2 series lead headed back to Minneapolis.

Games 6 and 7 were the most notable games of the series as both went into extra innings. In Game 6, the Braves forced extra innings thanks to an RBI single from Ron Gant that drove in Lemke in the top of the seventh. The game remained scoreless until the bottom of the eleventh, when Kirby Puckett hit the game-winning home run, which was famously called by CBS’ Jack Buck with the line "And we'll see you tomorrow night!"

Game 7 was the most famous contest of the series - despite a few attempts by both teams to win the game, as both teams managed to load the bases at least once, the game remained scoreless through all nine innings of regulation thanks to lights-out pitching from Morris. As the game went into the top of the tenth, Morris refused to leave the mound, and retired the Braves in order. The Twins then loaded the bases in the bottom of the tenth, and Gene Larkin drove in the game-winning run, securing the championship. Morris’ ten-inning complete game shutout in Game 7 was the longest postseason complete game shutout since Dave McNally’s eleven-inning shutout in Game 2 of the ALCS in 1969. Game 7 was the last World Series game ever played at the Hubert H. Humphrey Metrodome, and is the most recent World Series game played in the Minneapolis-St. Paul metropolitan area to date.

This was the first of five World Series appearances for the Braves during the 1990s. They would return to the World Series the next year, but lost to the Toronto Blue Jays in six games. The Braves would win the title in 1995 over the Cleveland Indians in six games to end a 38-year drought, which was the only one of their five appearances where they emerged victorious.

As of 2026, this is the last World Series appearance and title for the Twins. While the Twins would continue to experience regular season success years after their World Series victory, they have only made it past the divisional round once since. To date, this is currently the most recent championship of the four major North American sports leagues won by a Minneapolis–St. Paul-based team, and is the most recent time a Minneapolis-St. Paul based team has appeared in a championship series.

== Broadcasting ==
This marked the second year of a four-year agreement with CBS to televise all postseason games nationally in the United States.
