= 1982 Major League Baseball postseason =

1982 Major League Baseball playoffs

Tournament details
- Dates: October 5–20, 1982
- Teams: 4

Final positions
- Champions: St. Louis Cardinals (9th title)
- Runners-up: Milwaukee Brewers

Tournament statistics
- Games played: 15
- Attendance: 827,850 (55,190 per game)
- Most HRs: Willie McGee (STL) (3)
- Most SBs: Five tied (2)
- Best ERA: Joaquín Andújar (STL) (1.80)
- Most Ks (as pitcher): Don Sutton (MIL) (14)

Awards
- MVP: Darrell Porter (STL)

The 1982 Major League Baseball postseason was the playoff tournament of Major League Baseball for the 1982 season. The winners of each division advance to the postseason and face each other in a League Championship Series to determine the pennant winners that face each other in the World Series.

In the American League, the California Angels made their second postseason appearance in the past four years, and the Milwaukee Brewers made their second straight postseason appearance and last as a member of the American League. This would be Milwaukee’s last postseason appearance until 2008.

In the National League, the St. Louis Cardinals made their first postseason appearance since 1968 and first of the divisional era, and the Atlanta Braves made their first postseason appearance since 1969. This was the last postseason appearance for the Braves until 1991, when the team would start a streak of fourteen straight postseason appearances from 1991 to 2005 (excluding 1994, when the postseason was canceled due to a strike).

The playoffs began on October 5, 1982, and concluded on October 20, 1982, with the Cardinals defeating the Brewers in seven games in the 1982 World Series. This was the first title since 1967 for the Cardinals and their ninth overall.

== Teams ==
American League Teams National League Teams

The following teams qualified for the postseason:

=== American League ===
- Milwaukee Brewers – 95–67, AL East champions
- California Angels – 93–69, AL West champions

=== National League ===
- St. Louis Cardinals – 92–70, NL East champions
- Atlanta Braves – 89–73, NL West champions

== Playoff bracket ==
League Championship Series (ALCS, NLCS)
East	Milwaukee	3
West	California	2
East	St. Louis	3
West	Atlanta	0

World Series
AL	Milwaukee	3
NL	St. Louis	4

== American League Championship Series ==
=== Milwaukee Brewers vs. California Angels ===
Milwaukee won the series, 3–2.

Game	Date	Score	Location	Time	Attendance
1	October 5	Milwaukee Brewers – 3, California Angels – 8	Anaheim Stadium	2:31	64,406
2	October 6	Milwaukee Brewers – 2, California Angels – 4	Anaheim Stadium	2:06	64,179
3	October 8	California Angels – 3, Milwaukee Brewers – 5	County Stadium	2:31	50,135
4	October 9	California Angels – 5, Milwaukee Brewers – 9	County Stadium	3:10	51,003
5	October 10	California Angels – 3, Milwaukee Brewers – 4	County Stadium	3:01	54,968

This was the first playoff series between expansion teams, and the first ALCS to not feature either the Baltimore Orioles, Oakland Athletics, New York Yankees, or Kansas City Royals. Down two games to none, the Brewers rallied to defeat the Angels in five games and advance to the World Series for the first time in franchise history.

In Game 1, Tommy John pitched a complete game as the Angels blew out the Brewers. Game 2 was a pitchers’ duel between Milwaukee’s Pete Vuckovich and California’s Bruce Kison, which was won by the latter as Kison pitched yet another complete game for the Angels as they won to take a 2–0 series lead heading to Milwaukee. There, the Brewers responded. Don Sutton pitched seven innings of shutout ball and closer Pete Ladd held off a late rally by the Angels to get the Brewers on the board in the series. Game 4 was an offensive slugfest which was won by the Brewers as they evened the series. In Game 5, the Angels lead 3-2 and were nine outs away from the pennant, then disaster struck - the Brewers loaded the bases, and then Cecil Cooper hit a two-run RBI single to put the Brewers in the lead for good, clinching the pennant. The Brewers became the first team in postseason history to come back from a two-games-to-none deficit to win the pennant. This would be the last playoff series won by the Brewers until 2011.

The Angels returned to the ALCS in 1986, but they would lose to the Boston Red Sox in seven games after leading the series 3–1 and being a strike away from the pennant in Game 5. They would eventually win the pennant in 2002 over the Minnesota Twins in five games en route to a World Series title.

This was the only pennant the Brewers won during their time in the American League. The Brewers reached the NLCS in 2011, but were upset by the eventual World Series champion St. Louis Cardinals in six games. They would eventually win a pennant again in 2026, in a sweep over the Los Angeles Dodgers en route to a World Series title.

== National League Championship Series ==
=== Atlanta Braves vs. St. Louis Cardinals ===
St. Louis won the series, 3–0.

Game	Date	Score	Location	Time	Attendance
1	October 7	Atlanta Braves – 0, St. Louis Cardinals – 7	Busch Stadium (II)	2:25	53,008
2	October 9	Atlanta Braves – 3, St. Louis Cardinals – 4	Busch Stadium (II)	2:46	53,408
3	October 10	St. Louis Cardinals – 6, Atlanta Braves – 2	Atlanta–Fulton County Stadium	2:51	52,173

This was the first LCS since 1969 to not feature a team from Ohio, Pennsylvania, or California.

This was the first postseason meeting between the Cardinals and Braves. The Cardinals swept the Braves to return to the World Series for the first time since 1968.

This series was heavily lopsided in favor of the Cardinals - Bob Forsch threw a three-hit complete-game shutout as the Cardinals blew out the Braves in Game 1. In Game 2, the Braves held a 3–2 lead after seven innings, but the Cardinals rallied with two unanswered runs across the eighth and ninth innings respectively to take a 2–0 series lead headed to Atlanta. In Game 3, the Cardinals jumped out to a big lead early and maintained it, as Joaquín Andújar and closer Bruce Sutter held the Braves' offense at bay to help the Cardinals win 6–2 and clinch the pennant. This was the first playoff series won by the Cardinals since the 1967 World Series.

This was the first of three NL pennants won by the Cardinals during the 1980s - they would win it again in 1985 against their archrival in the Los Angeles Dodgers in six games, and in 1987 against the San Francisco Giants in seven games, but they would fall in the World Series each time afterwards.

The Braves returned to the NLCS in 1991, and defeated the Pittsburgh Pirates in seven games for the pennant before falling in the World Series.

The Braves and Cardinals would meet again in the NLCS in 1996, where the Braves defeated the Cardinals in seven games after trailing three games to one before falling in the World Series that year.

== 1982 World Series ==
=== Milwaukee Brewers (AL) vs. St. Louis Cardinals (NL) ===
St. Louis won the series, 4–3.

Game	Date	Score	Location	Time	Attendance
1	October 12	Milwaukee Brewers – 10, St. Louis Cardinals – 0	Busch Stadium	2:30	53,723
2	October 13	Milwaukee Brewers – 4, St. Louis Cardinals – 5	Busch Stadium	2:54	53,723
3	October 15	St. Louis Cardinals – 6, Milwaukee Brewers – 2	County Stadium	2:53	56,556
4	October 16	St. Louis Cardinals – 5, Milwaukee Brewers – 7	County Stadium	3:04	56,560
5	October 17	St. Louis Cardinals – 4, Milwaukee Brewers – 6	County Stadium	3:02	56,562
6	October 19	Milwaukee Brewers – 1, St. Louis Cardinals – 13	Busch Stadium	2:21	53,723
7	October 20	Milwaukee Brewers – 3, St. Louis Cardinals – 6	Busch Stadium	2:50	53,723

This was the first World Series since 1968 to not feature a team from New York, Pennsylvania, Ohio, or California.

This was the first postseason meeting between the Brewers and Cardinals. The Cardinals narrowly defeated the Brewers in seven games to win their first title since 1967, and their ninth overall. This marked the fourth straight World Series won by the National League.

Mike Caldwell pitched a three-hit complete-game shutout as the Brewers blew out the Cardinals in Game 1. The Cardinals narrowly won Game 2 after using four different pitchers to even the series headed to Milwaukee. In the first World Series game played in Milwaukee in 24 years, Joaquín Andújar pitched seven solid innings as the Cardinals took a 2–1 series lead. Then, things went south for the Cardinals. In Game 4, the Cardinals led 5-1 going into the bottom of the seventh, but the Brewers put up six unanswered runs to take the lead for good and even the series. Caldwell pitched eight solid innings as the Brewers won to take a 3-2 series lead headed back to St. Louis. Game 5 was the last postseason game ever played at Milwaukee County Stadium. In Game 6, the Cardinals blew out the Brewers by a whopping twelve runs to force a Game 7, with John Stuper pitching a complete game for the Cardinals. The Cardinals’ twelve-run margin of victory in Game 6 was the largest in a World Series game since Game 6 of the 1968 World Series (which, ironically, was a Cardinals loss), and is tied for the third largest margin of victory in a World Series game overall. In Game 7, the Brewers led 3–1 going into the bottom of the sixth and were eleven outs away from the championship, until Brewers' manager Harvey Kuenn pulled starting pitcher Pete Vuckovich after the Cardinals got men on first and third bases. This decision proved to be fatal for the Brewers, as the Cardinals scored three unanswered runs to take the lead for good, and added two more in the bottom of the eighth, securing the title.

This would be the final postseason appearance by the Brewers as a member of the American League. They would return to the postseason in 2008 as a member of the National League. This was the last appearance by a Milwaukee-based team in the championship round of the four major leagues until the NBA’s Milwaukee Bucks made and won the 2021 NBA Finals. The Brewers would return to the World Series in 2026, and defeated the Tampa Bay Rays in five games for their first championship.

The Cardinals’ fifteen-year drought between championships was the longest by the franchise since going 22 years without winning a title from 1946 to 1964. They would return to the World Series three years later, but lost to their in-state foe in the Kansas City Royals in seven games after leading the series 3–1 and being two outs away from the championship in Game 6. They would then lose in their next two World Series appearances afterwards. The Cardinals would eventually go on a Cinderella run to the World Series in 2006 as an 83-win team, where they upset the Detroit Tigers in five games for their long-awaited tenth championship.

The Brewers and Cardinals would meet again in the NLCS in 2011, which the Cardinals also won en route to a World Series title.

== Broadcasting ==
ABC televised both LCS nationally in the United States. Under MLB's broadcasting rules at the time, each team's local broadcaster was allowed to also televise coverage of LCS games. However, the Atlanta Braves' broadcaster was a cable superstation, WTBS, that was available nationally. When the channel tried to petition for the right to do a "local" Braves broadcast of the NLCS, MLB got a Philadelphia federal court to ban them on the grounds that as a cable superstation, WTBS could not have a nationwide telecast competing with ABC.

NBC aired the World Series.
