= Troy O'Leary =

American baseball player (born 1969)

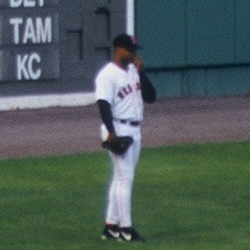
- O'Leary with the Boston Red Sox in 1998
- Outfielder
- Born: August 4, 1969 (age 56); Compton, California, U.S.
- Batted: Left Threw: Left

Professional debut
- MLB: May 9, 1993, for the Milwaukee Brewers
- KBO: 2004, for the Samsung Lions

Last appearance
- MLB: September 28, 2003, for the Chicago Cubs
- KBO: 2004, for the Samsung Lions

MLB statistics
- Batting average: .274
- Home runs: 127
- Runs batted in: 591

KBO statistics
- Batting average: .265
- Home runs: 10
- Runs batted in: 28
- Stats at Baseball Reference

Teams
- Milwaukee Brewers (1993–1994); Boston Red Sox (1995–2001); Montreal Expos (2002); Chicago Cubs (2003); Samsung Lions (2004)

Troy Franklin O'Leary (born August 4, 1969) is an American former professional baseball outfielder. He played in Major League Baseball (MLB) for the Milwaukee Brewers (1993-1994), Boston Red Sox (1995-2001), Montreal Expos (2002) and Chicago Cubs (2003).

Over the course of his 11 year MLB career, O'Leary posted a .274 batting average with 127 home runs and 591 runs batted in in 1198 games.

== Early years ==
O'Leary was born in Compton, California and attended Cypress High School in Cypress, California. He initially committed to play college football at Oregon State as a wide receiver.

== Professional career ==
O'Leary was drafted by the Milwaukee Brewers in the 13th-round of the 1987 MLB draft.

O'Leary enjoyed an impressive 1992 season at Double-A El Paso, winning the Texas League batting title as well as being named the 1992 Texas League MVP (Player of the Year). In addition to his league leading .334 batting average, O’Leary finished the 1992 season with 5 home runs, 79 RBI and 28 stolen bases.

O'Leary made his Major League debut for the Milwaukee Brewers in a home game at County Stadium on May 9, 1993 as a defensive replacement in left field against the Boston Red Sox. Over the course of the 1993 and 1994 MLB seasons, O'Leary played in a total of 46 games for the Milwaukee Brewers, batting .280 in 122 plate appearances.

On April 14, 1995, O'Leary was selected off waivers by the Boston Red Sox.

In his first season with the Boston Red Sox, O'Leary played in 112 games and finished with a .308 batting average. He was named the 1995 Red Sox Rookie of the Year.

O’Leary enjoyed the best year of his career statistically in 1999. He led the Red Sox with 28 home runs in the regular season, was second on the team to Nomar Garciaparra in RBI (103), and finished with a .280 batting average. He played in 157 of the 162 regular season games and finished with 596 at bats, leading the team in both categories. Troy also posted 84 runs (3rd on team), 167 hits (3rd on team), 36 doubles (4th on team), and a .495 slugging percentage (3rd on team).

One of the greatest performances of O'Leary's career and in Boston Red Sox postseason history took place on October 11, 1999 in the decisive game 5 of the 1999 American League Division Series versus the Cleveland Indians. With one out in the top of the third inning and the Indians holding a 2 run lead, Boston had baserunners on second and third base, leaving first base open. Indians manager Mike Hargrove chose to intentionally walk Nomar Garciaparra, who had already homered in the first inning, to load the bases for O'Leary. O'Leary responded by sending the first pitch he saw, a Charles Nagy breaking ball, 417 feet over the right field fence for the first grand slam in Red Sox post-season history, giving Boston a 7-5 lead. When the seventh inning began, the game was tied 8-8. With John Valentin standing on second and first base open, Hargrove again chose to intentionally walk Garciaparra to get to O'Leary, this time with Paul Shuey on the mound. O'Leary responded by once again jumping on the first pitch he saw, crushing a line drive over the right field fence for a 3 run home-run. O'Leary's 7 RBI, along with 6 no-hit relief innings from Pedro Martinez, helped to seal the victory and advanced the Red Sox to the 1999 American League Championship Series against the New York Yankees.

O'Leary would spend two more seasons with the Boston Red Sox until the signing of slugger left fielder Manny Ramirez reduced O'Leary's role. O'Leary collected at least 70 RBI from 1996-2000 and reached double digit home run totals in each of his 7 seasons with the Red Sox. Over his 7 seasons as a member of the Boston Red Sox, O’Leary played in a total of 962 games, collected 954 hits, 117 home runs, and batted .276.

O’Leary went on to play 97 games for the Montreal Expos in 2002, batting .286 in 314 plate appearances.

O'Leary signed with the Chicago Cubs in 2003, batting .218 in 194 plate appearances.

During Game 7 of the 2003 National League Championship Series at Wrigley Field, in what turned out to be the final at-bat of his Major League Baseball career, O'Leary hit a pinch hit home run in the bottom of the 7th inning off of Josh Beckett.

O'Leary spent 2004 with the Samsung Lions of the Korea Baseball Organization.

In 1198 games over 11 major league seasons, O'Leary posted a .274 batting average (1100-for-4010) with 547 runs, 234 doubles, 40 triples, 127 home runs, 591 RBI, 334 bases on balls, .332 on-base percentage and .448 slugging percentage. He finished his career with a .985 fielding percentage playing at all three outfield positions. In 18 postseason games, he batted .217 (13-for-60) with 7 runs, 3 doubles, 3 home runs, 9 RBI and 5 walks.
