= 2000 Major League Baseball postseason =

2000 Major League Baseball playoffs

Tournament details
- Dates: October 3–26, 2000
- Teams: 8

Final positions
- Champions: New York Yankees (26th title)
- Runners-up: New York Mets

Tournament statistics
- Most HRs: Derek Jeter (NYY) & Mike Piazza (NYM) (4)
- Most SBs: Édgar Rentería (STL) (5)
- Most Ks (as pitcher): Roger Clemens (NYY) (34)

Awards
- MVP: Derek Jeter (NYY)

The 2000 Major League Baseball postseason was the playoff tournament of Major League Baseball for the 2000 season. The winners of the League Division Series would move on to the League Championship Series to determine the pennant winners that face each other in the World Series.

In the American League, the New York Yankees returned to the postseason for the sixth straight time, the Chicago White Sox made their first appearance since 1993, the Seattle Mariners returned for the third time in six years, and the Oakland Athletics made their first appearance since 1992. This was the first of three straight appearances for the Athletics.

In the National League, the Atlanta Braves made their ninth straight appearance in the postseason. Next were the St. Louis Cardinals and San Francisco Giants, who both returned for the second time in five years, marking the first time since 1989 that both teams from the San Francisco Bay Area made the postseason. The last team on the NL side were the New York Mets, who returned for the second straight year. This postseason was notable in that it was the first time that both #1 seeds from the American and National Leagues failed to make it past the LDS.

The postseason began on October 3, 2000, and ended on October 26, 2000, with the Yankees defeating the Mets in five games in the 2000 World Series, also known as the "Subway Series" as both teams were from New York City. The Yankees completed a three-peat and won their 26th title in franchise history, and were the last repeat World Series champion until the Los Angeles Dodgers in 2025.

== Playoff seeds ==
American League Teams National League Teams

The following teams qualified for the post-season:

=== American League ===
1. Chicago White Sox – 95–67, AL Central champions
2. Oakland Athletics – 91–70, AL West champions
3. New York Yankees – 87–74, AL East champions
4. Seattle Mariners – 91–71

=== National League ===
1. San Francisco Giants – 97–65, NL West champions
2. St. Louis Cardinals – 95–67, NL Central champions (4–3 head-to-head record vs. ATL)
3. Atlanta Braves – 95–67, NL East champions (3–4 head-to-head record vs. STL)
4. New York Mets – 94–68

== Playoff bracket ==
Division Series (ALDS, NLDS)
1	Chicago White Sox	0
4	Seattle	3
American League
2	Oakland	2
3	NY Yankees	3
1	San Francisco	1
4	NY Mets	3
National League
2	St. Louis	3
3	Atlanta	0

League Championship Series (NLCS, ALCS)
4	Seattle	2
3	NY Yankees	4
4	NY Mets	4
2	St. Louis	1

World Series
AL3	NY Yankees	4
NL4	NY Mets	1

== American League Division Series ==
=== (1) Chicago White Sox vs. (4) Seattle Mariners ===
Seattle won the series, 3–0.

Game	Date	Score	Location	Time	Attendance
1	October 3	Seattle Mariners – 7, Chicago White Sox – 4 (10)	Comiskey Park (II)	4:12	45,290
2	October 4	Seattle Mariners – 5, Chicago White Sox – 2	Comiskey Park (II)	3:16	45,383
3	October 6	Chicago White Sox – 1, Seattle Mariners – 2	Safeco Field	2:40	48,010

The Mariners upset the top-seeded White Sox in a sweep to return to the ALCS for the second time in six years.

The Mariners took Game 1 in Chicago in extra innings thanks to home runs from Edgar Martínez and John Olerud in the top of the tenth. Game 2 started off tied at two runs early, until Jay Buhner hit a solo home run in the top of the fourth that put the Mariners in the lead for good, giving them a 2–0 series lead headed home. In Game 3, the White Sox got out to an early lead thanks to a sacrifice fly from Herbert Perry, but the Mariners tied the game and then won in the bottom of the ninth thanks to a bunt from Carlos Guillén.

The White Sox returned to the postseason in 2005, where they won the World Series over the Houston Astros in a sweep.

=== (2) Oakland Athletics vs. (3) New York Yankees ===
New York won the series, 3–2.

Game	Date	Score	Location	Time	Attendance
1	October 3	New York Yankees – 3, Oakland Athletics – 5	Network Associates Coliseum	3:04	47,360
2	October 4	New York Yankees – 4, Oakland Athletics – 0	Network Associates Coliseum	3:15	47,860
3	October 6	Oakland Athletics – 2, New York Yankees – 4	Yankee Stadium (I)	3:12	56,606
4	October 7	Oakland Athletics – 11, New York Yankees – 1	Yankee Stadium (I)	3:42	56,915
5	October 8	New York Yankees – 7, Oakland Athletics – 5	Network Associates Coliseum	3:50	41,170

This was the second postseason meeting between the Yankees and Athletics. They last met in the ALCS in 1981, which the Yankees won in a sweep before falling in the World Series. The Yankees once again defeated the Athletics, this time in five games, to return to the ALCS for the fourth time in five years.

The Athletics took Game 1 at home as Gil Heredia outdueled Roger Clemens in a 5-3 win. Andy Pettitte and Mariano Rivera blanked the Athletics offense in Game 2 as the Yankees won 4-0 to even the series heading to the Bronx. In Game 3, Orlando Hernández pitched seven solid innings and Rivera got another save as the Yankees won 4-2 to take the series lead. In Game 4, Clemens lost yet another pitchers’ duel to Barry Zito as the Athletics blew out the Yankees to force a decisive fifth game back in Oakland. In Game 5, the Yankees jumped out to a big lead early, and Mike Stanton and Rivera stopped a rally by the Athletics to prevail 7-5.

Both teams would meet again in the ALDS the next year, and in the Wild Card Game in 2018, with the Yankees winning both meetings.

== National League Division Series ==
=== (1) San Francisco Giants vs. (4) New York Mets ===
New York won the series, 3–1.

Game	Date	Score	Location	Time	Attendance
1	October 4	New York Mets – 1, San Francisco Giants – 5	Pacific Bell Park	3:06	40,430
2	October 5	New York Mets – 5, San Francisco Giants – 4 (10)	Pacific Bell Park	3:41	40,430
3	October 7	San Francisco Giants – 2, New York Mets – 3 (13)	Shea Stadium	5:22	56,270
4	October 8	San Francisco Giants – 0, New York Mets – 4	Shea Stadium	2:48	56,245

This was the first postseason meeting between the Giants and Mets. The Mets defeated the top-seeded Giants in four games to advance to the NLCS for the second year in a row.

The Giants took Game 1 by four runs, capped off by a three-run home run from Ellis Burks. In Game 2, the Mets held a 4-1 lead going into the bottom of the ninth, when J. T. Snow hit a three-run home run to force extra innings. Jay Payton then put the Mets back in the lead for good with an RBI single in the top of the tenth to even the series headed to Queens. In a long and grueling Game 3, the Mets won in the bottom of the thirteenth thanks to a walk-off homer from Benny Agbayani. In Game 4, Bobby Jones pitched a one-hit complete game shutout for the Mets as they won 4-0 to advance to the NLCS.

This marked the first time in postseason history that both #1 seeds fell in the LDS. Both teams would meet again in the Wild Card Game in 2016, which the Giants won in a shutout.

=== (2) St. Louis Cardinals vs. (3) Atlanta Braves ===
St. Louis won the series, 3–0.

Game	Date	Score	Location	Time	Attendance
1	October 3	Atlanta Braves – 5, St. Louis Cardinals – 7	Busch Stadium (II)	3:34	52,378
2	October 5	Atlanta Braves – 4, St. Louis Cardinals – 10	Busch Stadium (II)	3:02	52,389
3	October 7	St. Louis Cardinals – 7, Atlanta Braves – 1	Turner Field	3:09	49,898

This was the third postseason meeting between the Cardinals and Braves (1982, 1996), and their first meeting outside of the NLCS. The Cardinals swept the defending National League champion Braves to advance to the NLCS for the second time in four years, ending the Braves’ eight-year NLCS appearance streak.

The series was not close - the Cardinals completely dominated the Braves in this series. In Game 1, the Cardinals’ offense overwhelmed Greg Maddux and their bullpen held off a late rally by the Braves to win 7-5. In Game 2, Will Clark, Carlos Hernández, and Ray Lankford chased Tom Glavine from the mound as the Cardinals blew out the Braves to take a 2-0 series lead headed to Atlanta. Fernando Viña and Jim Edmonds led the way for the Cardinals’ offense in Game 3 in yet another blowout win to complete the sweep.

The Cardinals and Braves would meet in the postseason two more times - in the Wild Card Game in 2012, and the NLDS in 2019, both won by the Cardinals.

== American League Championship Series ==
=== (3) New York Yankees vs. (4) Seattle Mariners ===
New York won the series, 4–2.

Game	Date	Score	Location	Time	Attendance
1	October 10	Seattle Mariners – 2, New York Yankees – 0	Yankee Stadium (I)	3:45	54,481
2	October 11	Seattle Mariners – 1, New York Yankees – 7	Yankee Stadium (I)	3:36	55,317
3	October 13	New York Yankees – 8, Seattle Mariners – 2	Safeco Field	3:35	47,827
4	October 14	New York Yankees – 5, Seattle Mariners – 0	Safeco Field	2:59	47,803
5	October 15	New York Yankees – 2, Seattle Mariners – 6	Safeco Field	4:14	47,802
6	October 17	Seattle Mariners – 7, New York Yankees – 9	Yankee Stadium (I)	4:03	56,598

This was the second edition of the postseason where both teams from New York City appeared in the LCS. This phenomenon occurred the previous year, and would occur once more in 2024.

This was the second postseason meeting between the Yankees and Mariners. They last met in the ALDS in 1995, which the Mariners won after being down two games to none in the series. The Yankees defeated the Mariners in six games, and returned to the World Series for the fourth time in five years.

Freddy García and Kazuhiro Sasaki kept the Yankees’ offense silent in Game 1 as the Mariners prevailed in a 2-0 shutout on the road. In Game 2, Orlando Hernández pitched eight solid innings as the Yankees blew out the Mariners to even the series headed to Seattle. Andy Pettitte and Mariano Rivera stymied the Seattle offense in Game 3 as the Yankees blew out the Mariners again to take the series lead. Roger Clemens pitched a one-hit complete game shutout in Game 4 as the Yankees won 5-0 to take a 3-1 series lead. In Game 5, the Yankees led 2-1 after four innings, but the Mariners offense finally woke up as they put up five unanswered runs in the bottom of the fifth in part thanks to home runs from Edgar Martínez and John Olerud to send the series back to the Bronx. Game 6 was an offensive shootout between both teams, which was won by the Yankees as David Justice hit a three-run home run in a six-run seventh inning to put the Yankees in the lead for good. Game 6 was the last MLB postseason game covered by NBC until 2026.

This was the second of what is currently four consecutive losses in the ALCS for the Mariners - the Yankees and Mariners would meet again in the ALCS the next year, where the 95-win Yankees defeated the 116-win Mariners in one of the biggest upsets in postseason history. Then, a quarter of a century later, the Mariners returned to the ALCS only to lose to the Toronto Blue Jays in seven games after leading the series two games to none and being eight outs away from the pennant in Game 7.

== National League Championship Series ==
=== (2) St. Louis Cardinals vs. (4) New York Mets ===
New York won the series, 4–1.

Game	Date	Score	Location	Time	Attendance
1	October 11	New York Mets – 6, St. Louis Cardinals – 2	Busch Stadium (II)	3:08	52,255
2	October 12	New York Mets – 6, St. Louis Cardinals – 5	Busch Stadium (II)	3:59	52,250
3	October 14	St. Louis Cardinals – 8, New York Mets – 2	Shea Stadium	3:23	55,693
4	October 15	St. Louis Cardinals – 6, New York Mets – 10	Shea Stadium	3:14	55,665
5	October 16	St. Louis Cardinals – 0, New York Mets – 7	Shea Stadium	3:17	55,695

This was the first NLCS since 1990 to not feature the Atlanta Braves. This was also the second edition of the postseason where both teams from New York City appeared in the LCS. This phenomenon occurred the previous year, and would occur once more in 2024.

This was the first postseason meeting between the Mets and Cardinals. The Mets defeated the Cardinals in five games to return to the World Series for the first time since 1986 (in the process denying a rematch of the 1964 World Series between the Yankees and Cardinals).

Mike Hampton pitched seven solid innings as the Mets stole Game 1 on the road. Game 2 was tied going into the top of the ninth, where Jay Payton won the game for the Mets with an RBI single to go up 2-0 in the series headed to Queens. In Game 3, Andy Benes pitched eight solid innings as the Cardinals blew out the Mets for their only win of the series. Game 4 was an offensive shootout that was won by the Mets as they once again chased St. Louis starter Darryl Kile from the mound. Game 5 was marred by controversy as Payton was hit near his left eye by a fastball from Cardinals’ pitcher Dave Veres in the bottom of the eighth. A fight then broke out between Veres and Payton, both benches and bullpens cleared, and the Shea Stadium crowd started mocking the Cardinals by chanting Na Na Hey Hey Kiss Him Goodbye and booing them as the inning ended. Otherwise, Game 5 was a stellar performance for the Mets, as Hampton pitched a three-hit complete game shutout in a blowout win to clinch the pennant and set up the first all-New York City World Series since 1956.

The Cardinals returned to the NLCS in 2002, but they fell to the San Francisco Giants in five games. They would win their next pennant in 2004 against the Houston Astros in seven games after being ten outs away from elimination in Game 7, but came up short in the World Series.

The Mets would win their next and most recent pennant in 2015 over the Chicago Cubs in a sweep before falling in the World Series.

Both teams would meet again in the NLCS in 2006, where the 83-win Cardinals upset the 97-win Mets in seven games en route to a World Series title.

== 2000 World Series ==
=== (AL3) New York Yankees vs. (NL4) New York Mets ===
The "Subway Series"

New York (AL) won the series, 4–1.

Game	Date	Score	Location	Time	Attendance
1	October 21	New York Mets – 3, New York Yankees – 4 (12)	Yankee Stadium	4:51	55,913
2	October 22	New York Mets – 5, New York Yankees – 6	Yankee Stadium	3:30	56,059
3	October 24	New York Yankees – 2, New York Mets – 4	Shea Stadium	3:39	55,299
4	October 25	New York Yankees – 3, New York Mets – 2	Shea Stadium	3:20	55,290
5	October 26	New York Yankees – 4, New York Mets – 2	Shea Stadium	3:32	55,292

This was the first all-New York World Series since 1956, and the first to feature two teams from the same state and same metropolitan area since 1989. The Yankees defeated the Mets in five games to complete a World Series three-peat, winning their 26th championship.

Game 1 was a long extra-innings contest that was won by the Yankees as José Vizcaíno drove in the winning run with an RBI single in the bottom of the twelfth. In Game 2, minor controversy occurred when a pitch from Roger Clemens shattered Mike Piazza's bat. The ball went foul, but a sharp edge of the bat came towards Clemens. He came off the mound and threw the bat towards the baseline, almost hitting the running Piazza. Piazza appeared baffled by Clemens' actions. After the game, Clemens would say he did not see Piazza running and threw the bat because he was pumped up with nervous energy and initially charged the incoming broken bat, believing it to be the ball. The Yankees won Game 2 by one run as Mariano Rivera stopped a last-minute rally by the Mets in the top of the ninth to go up 2–0 in the series. When the series shifted to Queens for Game 3, the Yankees lead 2-1 after five, but the Mets put up three unanswered runs, thanks to an RBI from Benny Agbayani and a sacrifice fly by Bubba Trammell to win and avoid a sweep. The Mets’ Game 3 victory ended a fourteen-game winning streak in World Series play for the Yankees dating back to Game 3 of the 1996 World Series. In Game 4, the Yankees jumped out to the lead first thanks to a Derek Jeter leadoff home run, and despite the Mets cutting their lead to one, would hold on to take a 3–1 series lead. Game 5 remained tied at two going into the top of the ninth, until a single from Luis Sojo scored Scott Brosius and Jorge Posada, which put the Yankees ahead for good, and Rivera earned his second save in the bottom of the inning as the Yankees closed out the Mets to complete a three-peat. Game 5 was the last World Series game ever played at Shea Stadium.

The Yankees became the first team since the 1972–74 Oakland Athletics to complete a World Series three-peat (the Athletics, ironically, also beat the Mets during their dynasty run, in 1973). This was also the third three-peat by the Yankees overall (1936-1938 and 1949-1951). The Yankees returned to the World Series again the next year in hopes of winning a fourth straight title, but would narrowly lose to the Arizona Diamondbacks in seven games after being two outs away from the title in Game 7. The Yankees' next and most recent title would come in 2009, where they defeated the Philadelphia Phillies in six games. As of 2026, this is the last time the Yankees won the World Series on the road.

The Mets would return to the World Series in 2015, but lost to the Kansas City Royals, also in five games.

== Broadcasting ==
This was the final year under a five-year U.S. rights agreement with ESPN, Fox, and NBC. Division Series games aired across the three networks. NBC then televised the American League Championship Series. With the 2000 United States presidential debates being held on October 3 and 17, NBC did a reverse mirror with the Pax Network, which it held minority ownership at the time. In some markets, the debates were shown on the local NBC station while the local Pax station aired baseball; in other markets, baseball aired on the local NBC station and the debates were televised on the local Pax station. Fox aired both the 2000 National League Championship Series and the World Series. NBC declined to renew its broadcasting rights after the season, eventually resulting in Fox televising the World Series ever since.
