= 2021 National League Division Series =

American baseball games

Teams
Team (Wins)		Manager	Season
Los Angeles Dodgers (3)		Dave Roberts	106–56 (.654), GB: 1
San Francisco Giants (2)		Gabe Kapler	107–55 (.660), GA: 1
- Dates: October 8–14
- Television: TBS
- TV announcers: Brian Anderson, Ron Darling, and Lauren Shehadi
- Radio: ESPN
- Radio announcers: Jon Sciambi and Kyle Peterson
- Umpires: Ted Barrett (crew chief), Doug Eddings, Ángel Hernández, Pat Hoberg, Gabe Morales, Carlos Torres

Teams
Team (Wins)		Manager	Season
Atlanta Braves (3)		Brian Snitker	88–73 (.547), GA: 6 1/2
Milwaukee Brewers (1)		Craig Counsell	95–67 (.586), GA: 5
- Dates: October 8–12
- Television: TBS
- TV announcers: Don Orsillo, Jeff Francoeur, and Matt Winer
- Radio: ESPN
- Radio announcers: Karl Ravech and Tim Kurkjian
- Umpires: Mike Estabrook, Will Little, Alfonso Márquez (crew chief), Mike Muchlinski, Tony Randazzo, Quinn Wolcott
- NLWC: Los Angeles Dodgers defeated St. Louis Cardinals, 3–1

The 2021 National League Division Series were two best-of-five playoff series on the National League side in Major League Baseball’s 2021 postseason to determine the participating teams of the 2021 National League Championship Series. The three divisional winners, seeded first through third, and a fourth team — determined by the NL Wild Card Game — played in two series. These matchups were:

- (1) San Francisco Giants (NL West champions) vs. (4) Los Angeles Dodgers (Wild Card Game winner): Dodgers won the series, 3–2.
- (2) Milwaukee Brewers (NL Central champions) vs. (3) Atlanta Braves (NL East champions): Braves won the series, 3–1.

The team with the better regular season record (higher seed) of each series hosted Games 1, 2, and (if necessary) 5, while the lower seeded team hosted Games 3 and (if necessary) 4.

The Braves would go on to defeat the Dodgers in six games in the NLCS, and would then defeat the American League champion Houston Astros in six games in the 2021 World Series.

== Background ==
Seeds 1–3 were determined by regular season winning percentages among division-winning teams. The final team was the winner of the National League Wild Card Game, played between the league's fourth and fifth-seeded teams.

The Milwaukee Brewers clinched the National League Central and the 2 seed in the NL on September 26 via their 95–67 record. The Atlanta Braves clinched the National League East and the 3 seed in the NL on September 30 via their 88–73 record. The Brewers and Braves were tied in their season series, with both winning three games each.

The San Francisco Giants clinched the National League West and home-field advantage throughout the entire playoffs with a 107–55 record on October 3, the last day of the regular season. The Los Angeles Dodgers defeated the St. Louis Cardinals in the Wild Card Game, 3–1, to advance to the NLDS. The postseason match-up between the two rivals was the first in their history and was a continuation of their battle over the NL West crown during the regular season. San Francisco won the season series over Los Angeles, 10–9.

The Giants made their first postseason appearance since 2016. This was the Braves' fourth straight postseason appearance, having won the NL East each of those seasons. The Brewers made their fourth straight postseason appearance, extending a franchise record. Also extending a franchise streak of postseason appearances were the Dodgers, who made their ninth straight appearance.

== Matchups ==
=== San Francisco Giants vs. Los Angeles Dodgers ===
Los Angeles won the series, 3–2.

Game	Date	Score	Location	Time	Attendance
1	October 8	Los Angeles Dodgers – 0, San Francisco Giants – 4	Oracle Park	2:39	41,934
2	October 9	Los Angeles Dodgers – 9, San Francisco Giants – 2	Oracle Park	3:27	42,275
3	October 11	San Francisco Giants – 1, Los Angeles Dodgers – 0	Dodger Stadium	3:08	53,299
4	October 12	San Francisco Giants – 2, Los Angeles Dodgers – 7	Dodger Stadium	3:38	52,935
5	October 14	Los Angeles Dodgers – 2, San Francisco Giants – 1	Oracle Park	3:26	42,275

=== Milwaukee Brewers vs. Atlanta Braves ===
Atlanta won the series, 3–1.

Game	Date	Score	Location	Time	Attendance
1	October 8	Atlanta Braves – 1, Milwaukee Brewers – 2	American Family Field	3:00	40,852
2	October 9	Atlanta Braves – 3, Milwaukee Brewers – 0	American Family Field	3:23	43,812
3	October 11	Milwaukee Brewers – 0, Atlanta Braves – 3	Truist Park	3:20	41,479
4	October 12	Milwaukee Brewers – 4, Atlanta Braves – 5	Truist Park	3:53	40,195

== San Francisco vs. Los Angeles ==
This was the first postseason match-up in the history of the Dodgers–Giants rivalry and a continuation of the tight divisional race between the two rivals, which saw the Giants win a franchise-record 107 games and the Dodgers tie theirs at 106 wins. The Dodgers and Giants divisional race became only the fourth time a pair of 100 win teams in the same division were separated by one game, the others being: 1915 Red Sox/Tigers; 1962 Giants/Dodgers; and 1993 Braves/Giants. The Giants won the season series, 10–9.

There had been no prior postseason match-ups between the two rivals in the modern era, but they had previously met with high stakes on the line. When the teams were located in New York, they met in the 1951 National League tie-breaker series, due to both teams finishing with identical win–loss records of 96–58. It is most famous for the walk-off home run hit by Bobby Thomson of the Giants in the deciding game, which has come to be known as baseball's "Shot Heard 'Round the World". In California, and with identical 101–61 records after 162 games, the teams met with a pennant on the line in the 1962 National League tie-breaker series. The Giants closed out the series in Game 3 with a 6–4 victory to clinch their first pennant in San Francisco.

There were various connections between the two clubs, mainly due to the presence of the Giants' president of baseball operations, Farhan Zaidi. Zaidi was the Dodgers' general manager from 2014 to 2018. Giants manager Gabe Kapler was the Dodgers' director of player development from 2014 to 2017, where he had a hand in helping develop many of the Dodgers' homegrown players.

Additionally, managers Gabe Kapler and Dave Roberts were both members of the famed curse-breaking 2004 Red Sox (Roberts had been the pinch-runner who tied Game 4 of the ALCS, running for Kevin Millar who had walked).

The Dodgers and Giants 213 combined regular season wins were the most in MLB postseason series history, beating out the 1998 World Series between the 114–48 Yankees and 98–64 Padres (212 combined victories).

=== Game 1 ===
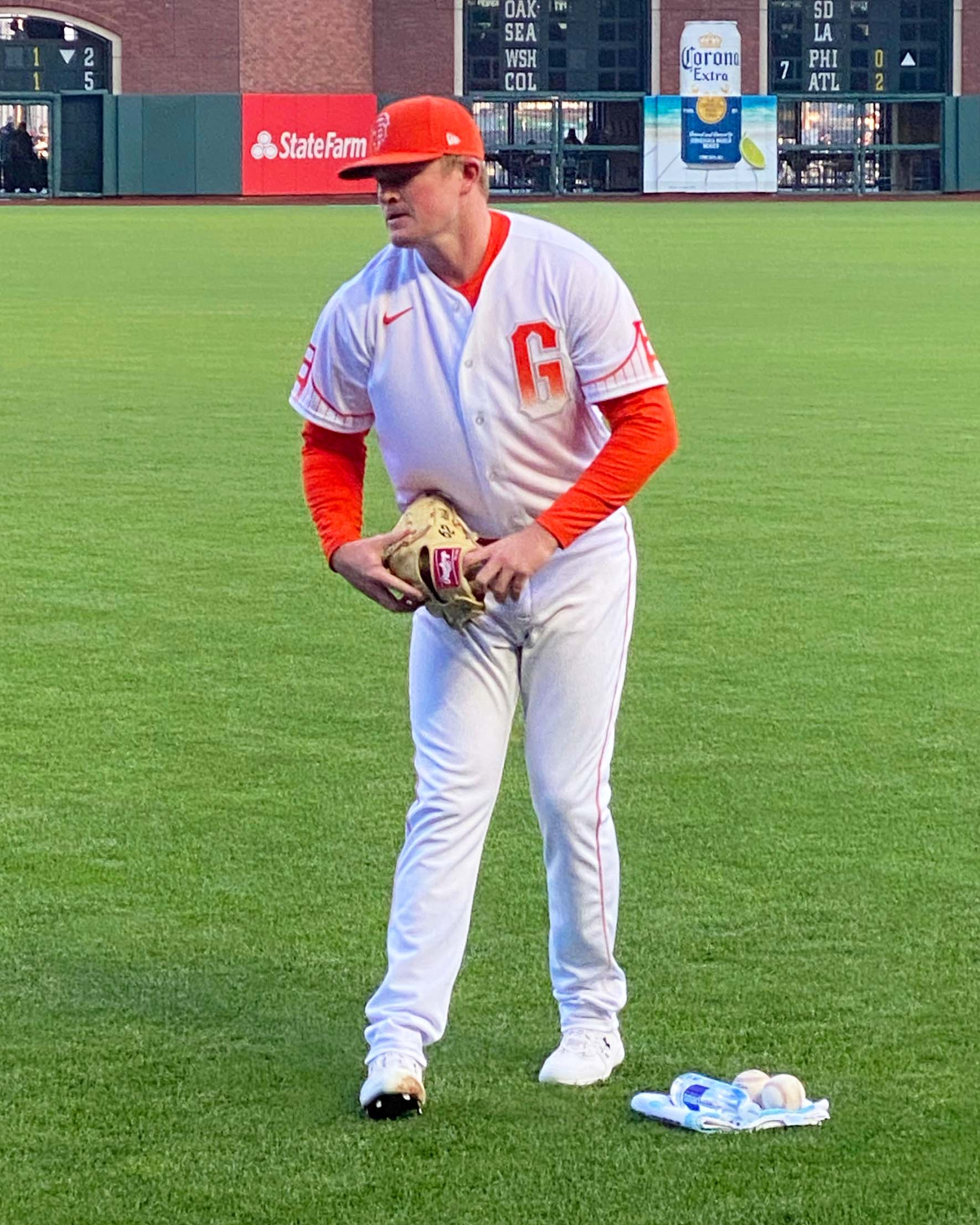
Logan Webb pitched seven scoreless innings in Game 1.

October 8, 2021 6:37 pm (PDT) at Oracle Park in San Francisco, California 59 °F (15 °C), Mostly cloudy
Team	1	2	3	4	5	6	7	8	9	R	H	E
Los Angeles	0	0	0	0	0	0	0	0	0	0	5	0
San Francisco	2	0	0	0	0	0	1	1	X	4	7	2
WP: Logan Webb (1–0) LP: Walker Buehler (0–1); Home runs: LAD: None; SF: Buster Posey (1), Kris Bryant (1), Brandon Crawford (1); Attendance: 41,934; Boxscore

Walker Buehler started for the Dodgers but the Giants pounced on him in the first inning, with a two-run homer by Buster Posey. Buehler recovered after that and kept the Giants from scoring again until allowing a solo homer by Kris Bryant in the seventh. Overall he allowed the three runs in 6 1/3 innings on six hits and one walk, while striking out five. The Giants added one more run on a homer by Brandon Crawford off Alex Vesia in the eighth. Meanwhile, Logan Webb pitched for the Giants and completely dominated the Dodgers, allowing five hits in 7 2/3 scoreless innings while striking out 10. The Giants took game one, 4–0.

=== Game 2 ===
October 9, 2021 6:07 pm (PDT) at Oracle Park in San Francisco, California 62 °F (17 °C), clear
Team	1	2	3	4	5	6	7	8	9	R	H	E
Los Angeles	0	2	0	0	0	4	0	3	0	9	11	0
San Francisco	0	1	0	0	0	1	0	0	0	2	6	0
WP: Julio Urías (1–0) LP: Kevin Gausman (0–1); Home runs: LAD: Will Smith (1); SF: None; Attendance: 42,275; Boxscore

Julio Urías started the second game for the Dodgers and only allowed one run on three hits in five innings, with five strikeouts. Kevin Gausman for the Giants allowed four runs in 5 1/3 innings. The Dodgers scored the first two runs in the second on RBI singles by Urías and Mookie Betts with the Giants getting one back in the bottom of the inning on a sacrifice fly by Donovan Solano. The Dodgers then scored four runs in the sixth on back-to-back doubles by Cody Bellinger and A. J. Pollock and they added three more in the eighth on a Will Smith homer and RBI singles by Matt Beaty and Corey Seager off of relievers Zack Littell and Jarlin García. The Giants scored on a Crawford single off Joe Kelly in the sixth but lost the game 9–2 to even up the series.

=== Game 3 ===
October 11, 2021 6:37 pm (PDT) at Dodger Stadium in Los Angeles, California 68 °F (20 °C), clear
Team	1	2	3	4	5	6	7	8	9	R	H	E
San Francisco	0	0	0	0	1	0	0	0	0	1	3	0
Los Angeles	0	0	0	0	0	0	0	0	0	0	5	0
WP: Tyler Rogers (1–0) LP: Max Scherzer (0–1) Sv: Camilo Doval (1); Home runs: SF: Evan Longoria (1); LAD: None; Attendance: 53,299; Boxscore

Max Scherzer allowed only three hits and one walk in seven innings while striking out 10. However, one of the hits he allowed was a solo home run by Evan Longoria in the fifth inning. Alex Wood and three relievers combined to hold the Dodgers scoreless for the second time in the series and the Giants took back the lead with a 1–0 victory.

=== Game 4 ===
October 12, 2021 6:07 pm (PDT) at Dodger Stadium in Los Angeles, California 64 °F (18 °C), clear
Team	1	2	3	4	5	6	7	8	9	R	H	E
San Francisco	0	0	0	0	1	0	0	1	0	2	7	1
Los Angeles	1	1	0	2	1	0	0	2	X	7	12	0
WP: Joe Kelly (1–0) LP: Anthony DeSclafani (0–1); Home runs: SF: None; LAD: Mookie Betts (1), Will Smith (2); Attendance: 52,935; Boxscore

In Game 4, the Dodgers jumped out to an early lead on a first inning RBI double by Trea Turner and a second inning sacrifice fly by Chris Taylor, driving Giants starter Anthony DeSclafani out of the game after just 1 2/3 innings, having allowed the two runs on five hits. A two-run homer by Mookie Betts in the fourth inning off of Jarlin García extended the lead. Walker Buehler, starting on short rest for the first time in his career, pitched 4 1/3 innings for the Dodgers, walking two and giving up only three hits. He left the game with two runners on, one of whom (Evan Longoria), scored on a Darin Ruf ground out against Joe Kelly. The Dodgers got the run back on a Betts sacrifice fly off of Tyler Rogers. Kris Bryant drove in the Giants second run on a ground out against Blake Treinen in the eighth but the Dodgers put the game out of reach thanks to a Will Smith two-run homer in the bottom of the eighth against Jake McGee. They won 7–2 to tie the series up once more.

=== Game 5 ===
October 14, 2021 6:08 pm (PDT) at Oracle Park in San Francisco, California 65 °F (18 °C), Mostly clear
Team	1	2	3	4	5	6	7	8	9	R	H	E
Los Angeles	0	0	0	0	0	1	0	0	1	2	8	1
San Francisco	0	0	0	0	0	1	0	0	0	1	6	0
WP: Kenley Jansen (1–0) LP: Camilo Doval (0–1) Sv: Max Scherzer (1); Home runs: LAD: None; SF: Darin Ruf (1); Attendance: 42,275; Boxscore

External videos
- Game 5 full replay on the MLB's official YouTube channel

The most recent prior Game 5 in a Division Series for the Dodgers was 2019, which they lost to the Washington Nationals, and for the Giants was 2012, which they won over the Cincinnati Reds. Logan Webb started for the Giants and went seven innings, while the Dodgers' Corey Knebel acted as an opener, only pitching the first inning. The Dodgers scored first, as Mookie Betts reached on a single in the sixth and was driven in on a double by Corey Seager. A home run by the Giants' Darin Ruf off of Julio Urías in the bottom of the inning tied the score. The Dodgers scored a run in the top off the ninth off of Giants closer Camilo Doval, via a hit by pitch and singles by Gavin Lux and Cody Bellinger. The Dodgers then sent in Max Scherzer to pitch the bottom of the ninth after Kenley Jansen pitched a scoreless eighth inning. With one out, Kris Bryant reached on an error by Justin Turner. Scherzer then recorded two strikeouts to end the threat. The final out was on a controversial checked swing third strike, as first base umpire Gabe Morales ruled that Wilmer Flores had offered on a two-strike pitch outside the strike zone. With their 110th win of the season (regular season and postseason), the Dodgers finally overtook the Giants and advanced to face the Atlanta Braves in the NLCS.

The Dodgers were only the third team in postseason history to allow no more than one run in two winner-take-all victories in the same year. The 2017 Astros did it in the ALCS and the World Series, while the 1981 Dodgers did it in both the NLDS and NLCS.

==== After Game 5 ====
As a result of their NLDS Game 5 loss, the Giants became the second of three teams to win 105+ games in a season to not advance to the LCS since the Division Series was introduced in 1995. The two other teams that lost under the same circumstances were the 106-win 2019 Dodgers, and afterwards, the 111-win 2022 Dodgers.

Game 5 was the last of Buster Posey's career, who retired at the season's end. Overall, 2021 would be seen as an outlier year for San Francisco. They could not replicate their magic in the 2022, 2023, or 2024 seasons. After the 2024 season, Posey was hired to become the president of baseball operations for the Giants, replacing Farhan Zaidi.

This was the first of three postseason match-ups of a Los Angeles-based sports team versus a Bay Area-based sports over the next 19 months. In January 2022, NFL's Los Angeles Rams defeated the San Francisco 49ers 20–17 in the 2021 NFC Championship Game. In May 2023, the NBA's Los Angeles Lakers won their Western Conference Semifinals match-up against the Golden State Warriors in six games.

=== Composite line score ===
2021 NLDS (3–2): Los Angeles Dodgers beat San Francisco Giants

Team	1	2	3	4	5	6	7	8	9	R	H	E
Los Angeles Dodgers	1	3	0	2	1	5	0	5	1	18	41	1
San Francisco Giants	2	1	0	0	2	2	1	2	0	10	29	3
Total attendance: 232,718 Average attendance: 46,544

== Milwaukee vs. Atlanta ==
This was the first postseason matchup between the Braves and the Brewers. The two teams each won three games in the six-game regular season series.

Historically, the Braves franchise was based in Milwaukee from 1953 to 1965, and both the Braves and Brewers retired the jersey of Hank Aaron, who started and ended his MLB career in the city of Milwaukee. While in the city, the Braves won the 1957 World Series, which was the franchise's second championship and last for 38 years.

=== Game 1 ===
October 8, 2021 3:39 pm (CDT) at American Family Field in Milwaukee, Wisconsin 73 °F (23 °C), roof closed
Team	1	2	3	4	5	6	7	8	9	R	H	E
Atlanta	0	0	0	0	0	0	0	1	0	1	4	0
Milwaukee	0	0	0	0	0	0	2	0	X	2	5	0
WP: Adrian Houser (1–0) LP: Charlie Morton (0–1) Sv: Josh Hader (1); Home runs: ATL: Joc Pederson (1); MIL: Rowdy Tellez (1); Attendance: 40,852; Boxscore

Game 1 of the series featured a pitcher's duel between Charlie Morton and Corbin Burnes. The game was scoreless until the bottom of the seventh, when Rowdy Tellez hit a two-run home run off of Morton to give Milwaukee the lead. In the eighth, Joc Pederson hit a pinch-hit solo home run to put the Braves on the board. The Braves made things interesting in the ninth against All-Star closer Josh Hader, but he closed the door after getting former Brewer Orlando Arcia to groundout to Kolten Wong. With the loss, the Braves fell to 4–12 in Game 1 of playoff series since 2000, with three of those wins coming in 2020.

=== Game 2 ===
October 9, 2021 4:07 pm (CDT) at American Family Field in Milwaukee, Wisconsin 71 °F (22 °C), roof open; mostly sunny
Team	1	2	3	4	5	6	7	8	9	R	H	E
Atlanta	0	0	2	0	0	1	0	0	0	3	7	0
Milwaukee	0	0	0	0	0	0	0	0	0	0	6	0
WP: Max Fried (1–0) LP: Brandon Woodruff (0–1) Sv: Will Smith (1); Home runs: ATL: Austin Riley (1); MIL: None; Attendance: 43,812; Boxscore

Game 2 featured a pitching match-up of Brandon Woodruff and Max Fried. Freddie Freeman and Ozzie Albies got the Braves on the board in the third inning with an RBI single and double (Albies double was originally ruled as a home run, but was changed on further review). Austin Riley extended the lead greeting Woodruff with a home run in his final inning of work. The Brewers put together a rally in the seventh inning, but Tyler Matzek stopped the threat by striking out Tyrone Taylor. The Brewers also had a bases loaded situation in the 9th, but closer Will Smith induced a game ending double-play off the bat of Luke Maile to tie the series at 1.

=== Game 3 ===
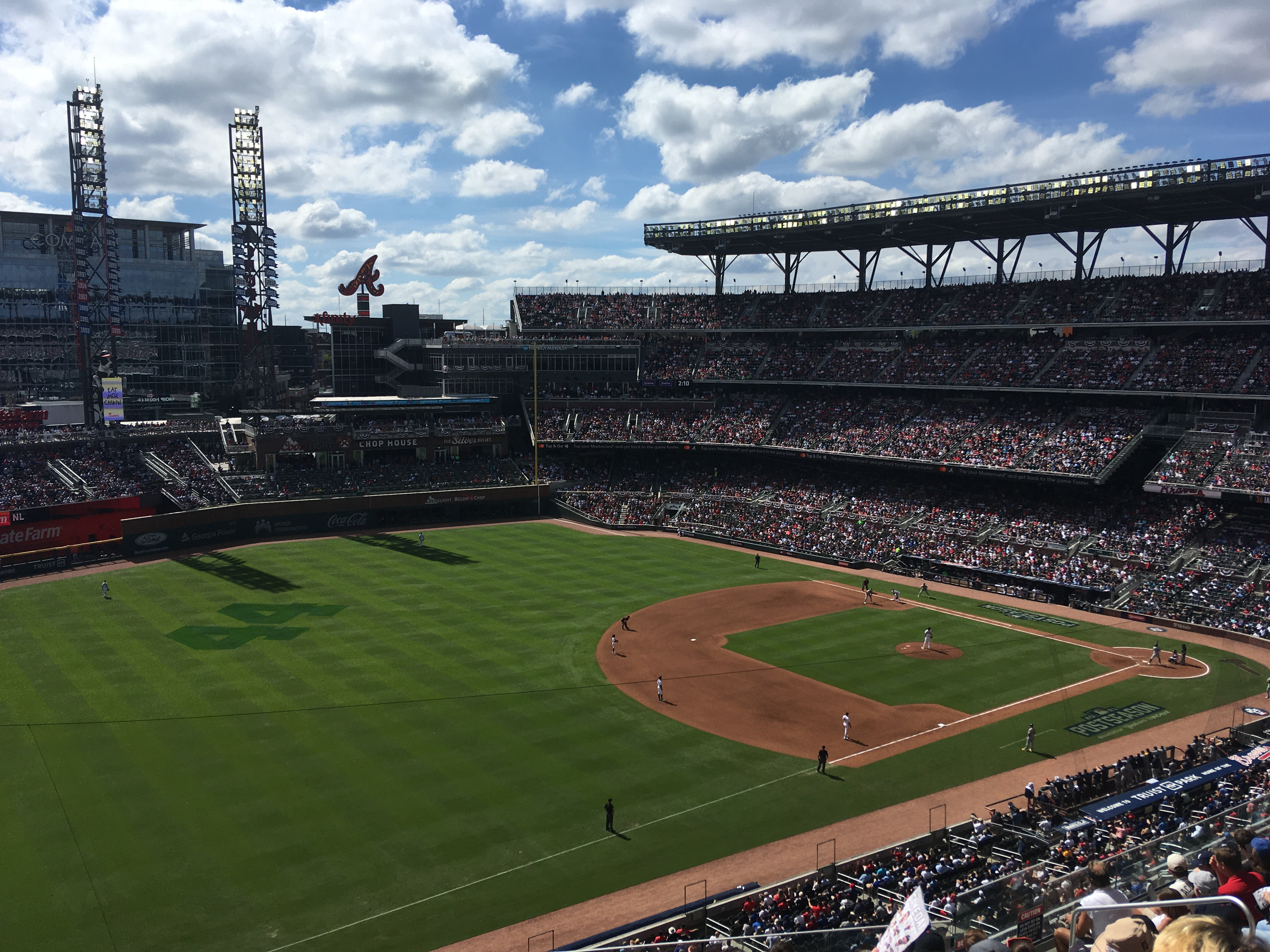
Truist Park during Game 3 of the 2021 NLDS

October 11, 2021 1:07 pm (EDT) at Truist Park in Cumberland, Georgia 76 °F (24 °C), Mostly cloudy
Team	1	2	3	4	5	6	7	8	9	R	H	E
Milwaukee	0	0	0	0	0	0	0	0	0	0	5	0
Atlanta	0	0	0	0	3	0	0	0	X	3	8	0
WP: Ian Anderson (1–0) LP: Adrian Houser (1–1) Sv: Will Smith (2); Home runs: MIL: None; ATL: Joc Pederson (2); Attendance: 41,479; Boxscore

Game 3 featured more of the same for the Brewers' offense, as they would be shut out in back-to-back games. In an attempt to try to get the offense going, Brewers starting pitcher Freddy Peralta was pulled after throwing four scoreless innings, as his spot was due up in the top of the fifth with runners on base. It did not work out as the Brewers threat was stopped and Joc Pederson belted a three-run home run in the fifth inning after Peralta was removed. Ian Anderson's five innings of scoreless ball was backed by stellar Braves' defense, as they moved one win from advancing back to the NL Championship Series.

=== Game 4 ===
October 12, 2021 5:15 pm (EDT) at Truist Park in Cumberland, Georgia 78 °F (26 °C), Mostly cloudy
Team	1	2	3	4	5	6	7	8	9	R	H	E
Milwaukee	0	0	0	2	2	0	0	0	0	4	8	0
Atlanta	0	0	0	2	2	0	0	1	X	5	11	1
WP: Tyler Matzek (1–0) LP: Josh Hader (0–1) Sv: Will Smith (3); Home runs: MIL: Rowdy Tellez (2); ATL: Freddie Freeman (1); Attendance: 40,195; Boxscore

Milwaukee scored their first runs since the seventh inning of game 1 with Omar Narváez and Lorenzo Cain RBI line drive singles in the top of the fourth inning. The Braves answered when Eddie Rosario singled home two runs himself in the bottom of the fourth. In the fifth inning Rowdy Tellez's two-run homer would also be answered by a Joc Pederson RBI groundout and a Travis d'Arnaud RBI single to tie the game again. The game remained tied until the bottom of the eighth inning when Freddie Freeman sent a Josh Hader slider into the left-center field bleachers to give the Braves a one-run lead. Will Smith struck out Christian Yelich in the ninth to send Atlanta to their second straight NL Championship Series.

=== Composite line score ===
2021 NLDS (3–1): Atlanta Braves beat Milwaukee Brewers

Team	1	2	3	4	5	6	7	8	9	R	H	E
Atlanta Braves	0	0	2	2	5	1	0	2	0	12	30	1
Milwaukee Brewers	0	0	0	2	2	0	2	0	0	6	24	0
Total attendance: 166,338 Average attendance: 41,585

== See also ==
- 2021 American League Division Series
- Dodgers–Giants rivalry
