= 2021 National League Championship Series =

Team (Wins)	Managers	Season
Atlanta Braves (4)	Brian Snitker	88–73 (.547), GA: 6 1/2
Los Angeles Dodgers (2)	Dave Roberts	106–56 (.654), GB: 1
- Dates: October 16–23
- MVP: Eddie Rosario (Atlanta)
- Umpires: Jordan Baker, Lance Barksdale, Mark Carlson, Tripp Gibson, James Hoye, Jerry Meals (crew chief), Todd Tichenor

Broadcast
- Television: TBS
- TV announcers: Brian Anderson, Ron Darling, Jeff Francoeur, and Lauren Shehadi
- Radio: ESPN
- Radio announcers: Jon Sciambi and Jessica Mendoza
- NLDS: Los Angeles Dodgers over San Francisco Giants (3–2); Atlanta Braves over Milwaukee Brewers (3–1)

The 2021 National League Championship Series was the best-of-seven series in Major League Baseball’s (MLB) 2021 postseason between the third-seeded Atlanta Braves and the defending World Series champion and fourth-seeded Los Angeles Dodgers, for the National League pennant and the right to play in the 2021 World Series. The matchup saw the Braves defeat the favored Dodgers by a score of 4 games to 2, sending the Braves to their first World Series since 1999, and in the process the Braves avenged their NLCS loss to the Dodgers the year prior.

The series was played in a 2–3–2 format, with the Braves hosting the first two and last two (if necessary) games played as the higher seeded team. TBS televised all games in the United States. Despite having a worse record than the Dodgers, the Braves held home-field advantage due their National League East division title (the Dodgers qualified for the postseason as a wild card).

The Braves would go on to defeat the American League champion Houston Astros in the World Series, 4 games to 2, to secure their first World Series championship since 1995.

In 2023, the Braves’ upset of the Dodgers in the NLCS was ranked as the fourth biggest upset in postseason history by MLB.com.

== Background ==
The Atlanta Braves qualified for the postseason as the National League East division leader. It was their fourth straight NL East championship, having won it every year since 2018. The Braves had the worst record out of all postseason teams, at 88–73, and they were the only postseason team with a win total under 90. In the National League Division Series, they beat the favored Milwaukee Brewers in four games. This was the Braves' 13th National League Championship Series (NLCS) appearance; however, they had not won an NLCS since 1999.

The Los Angeles Dodgers qualified for the postseason as a wild card entrant, after they failed to win the National League West for the first time since 2012. In the National League Wild Card Game, they defeated the St. Louis Cardinals on a two-run walk-off home run from Chris Taylor. In the National League Division Series, the Dodgers defeated their rivals, the San Francisco Giants, in five games. This was the Dodgers' fifth appearance in the NLCS in six seasons, sixth in nine seasons, and 15th overall. While the Dodgers had a better record than Braves during the regular season, the Braves held home-field advantage in the NLCS due to their NL East division crown and Dodgers status as a wild card.

This was the fifth postseason matchup between the Dodgers and Braves. The previous meetings were the 1996 NLDS (won by the Braves), 2013 NLDS, 2018 NLDS, and 2020 NLCS (the latter three won by the Dodgers). The two teams also met in the 1959 National League tie-breaker series, considered regular season games, with the Dodgers winning that series, two games to none, to advance to the 1959 World Series. The Braves and Dodgers also shared the same division (NL West) for 24 years (1969–1993), where they finished in the top two positions in the division in 1982, 1983, and 1991, all of which came down to the final week of the season.

This was the sixth time two teams met in a re-match in the NLCS in consecutive years, following the Cubs-Dodgers in 2016–2017, Dodgers-Phillies in 2008–2009, Astros-Cardinals in 2004–2005, Braves-Pirates in 1991–1992, and the Dodgers-Phillies again in 1977–1978.

The Braves and Dodgers played six games during the regular season, with the Dodgers winning the season series, 4–2.

== Summary ==
Atlanta won the series, 4–2.

Game	Date	Score	Location	Time	Attendance
1	October 16	Los Angeles Dodgers – 2, Atlanta Braves – 3	Truist Park	3:04	41,815
2	October 17	Los Angeles Dodgers – 4, Atlanta Braves – 5	Truist Park	3:56	41,873
3	October 19	Atlanta Braves – 5, Los Angeles Dodgers – 6	Dodger Stadium	4:14	51,307
4	October 20	Atlanta Braves – 9, Los Angeles Dodgers – 2	Dodger Stadium	3:27	53,025
5	October 21	Atlanta Braves – 2, Los Angeles Dodgers – 11	Dodger Stadium	3:33	51,363
6	October 23	Los Angeles Dodgers – 2, Atlanta Braves – 4	Truist Park	3:32	43,060

== Game summaries ==
Note that both teams had a player named "Will Smith"—a pitcher for Atlanta and a catcher for Los Angeles.

=== Game 1 ===
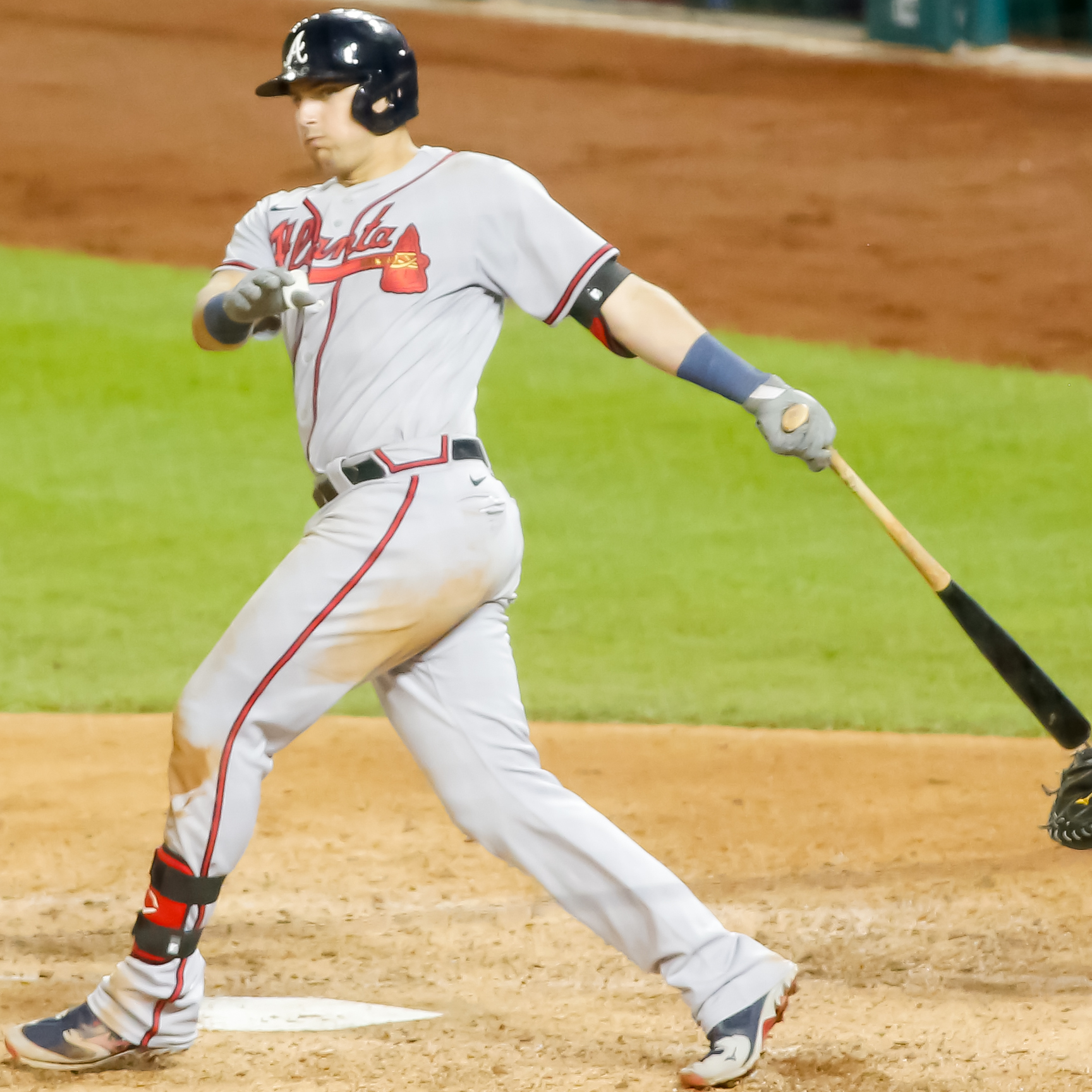
Austin Riley drove in two runs for Atlanta in Game 1.

October 16, 2021 8:08 pm (EDT) at Truist Park in Atlanta, Georgia 60 °F (16 °C), clear
Team	1	2	3	4	5	6	7	8	9	R	H	E
Los Angeles	0	1	0	1	0	0	0	0	0	2	10	0
Atlanta	1	0	0	1	0	0	0	0	1	3	6	0
WP: Will Smith (1–0) LP: Blake Treinen (0–1); Home runs: LAD: Will Smith (1); ATL: Austin Riley (1); Attendance: 41,815; Boxscore

Max Fried started for Atlanta, while Corey Knebel acted as an opener for Los Angeles. Atlanta took a 1–0 lead in the bottom of the first, as Eddie Rosario singled, stole second, advanced to third on a ground out, and scored on a wild pitch. The Dodgers tied the game in the top of the second; A. J. Pollock hit a two-out double and scored on a single by Chris Taylor. The teams traded solo home runs in the fourth inning—Will Smith for Los Angeles and Austin Riley for Atlanta—leaving the score tied, 2–2. Fried left after six innings, having allowed eight hits while striking out five batters. A two-out threat by the Dodgers in the top of the ninth was ended when Taylor was tagged out after being caught in a rundown between second and third. In the bottom of the ninth, Ozzie Albies hit a one-out bloop single off of Blake Treinen, stole second, and then scored on a Riley single to left, giving Atlanta a 1–0 lead in the series.

=== Game 2 ===
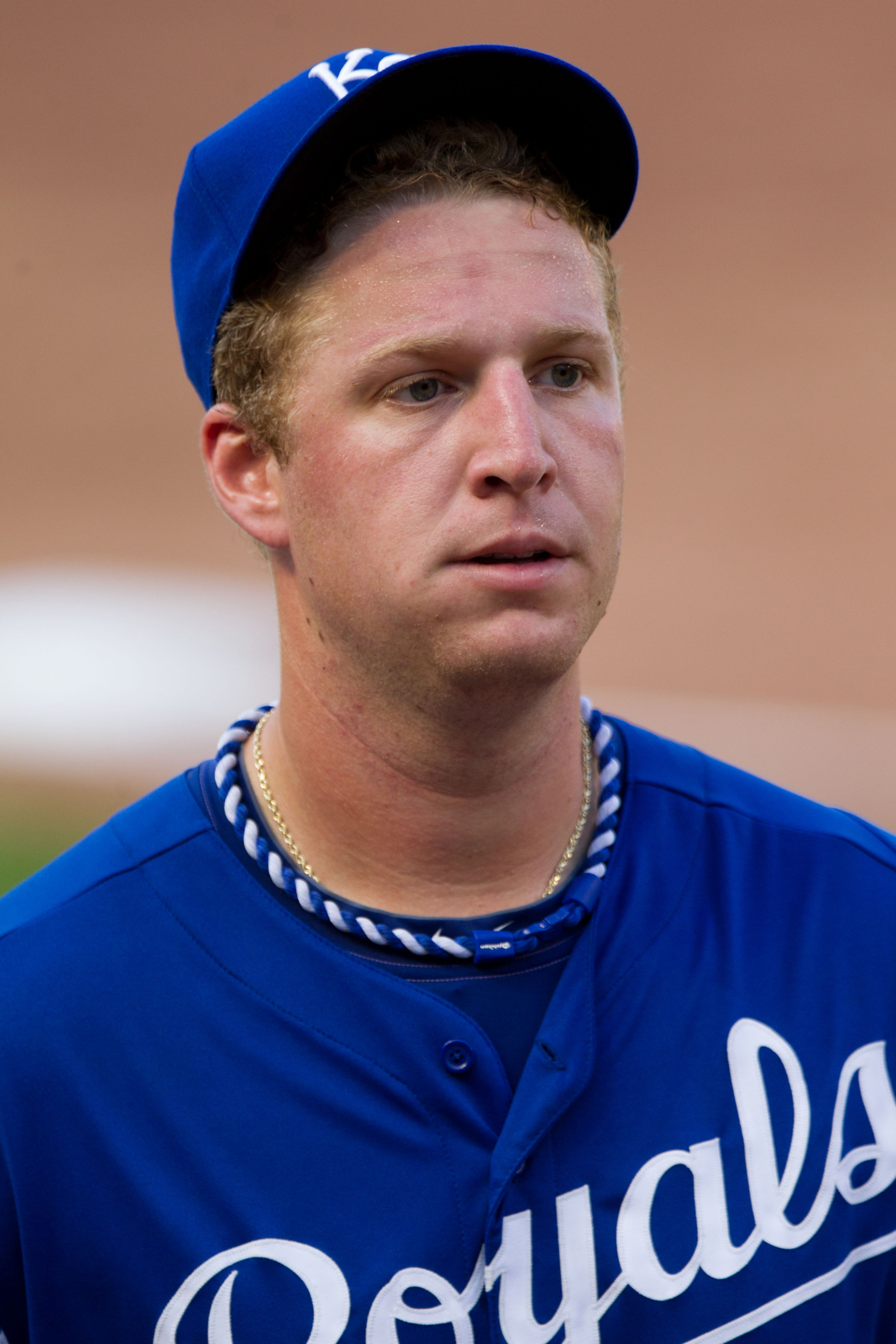
Will Smith was the winning pitcher in both Game 1 and Game 2 for Atlanta.

October 17, 2021 7:38 pm (EDT) at Truist Park in Atlanta, Georgia 59 °F (15 °C), clear
Team	1	2	3	4	5	6	7	8	9	R	H	E
Los Angeles	2	0	0	0	0	0	2	0	0	4	4	0
Atlanta	0	0	0	2	0	0	0	2	1	5	10	0
WP: Will Smith (2–0) LP: Brusdar Graterol (0–1); Home runs: LAD: Corey Seager (1); ATL: Joc Pederson (1); Attendance: 41,873; Boxscore

Starting pitchers were Ian Anderson for Atlanta and Max Scherzer for Los Angeles. Mookie Betts opened the game with a single, followed by a home run from Corey Seager, staking the Dodgers to an early 2–0 lead. Anderson was pinch hit for in the bottom of the third, having allowed two runs on three hits and three walks while striking out two batters. In the bottom of the fourth, Joc Pederson hit a one-out homer with Austin Riley on base, tying the game, 2–2. Scherzer left with one out in the bottom of the fifth, having allowed two runs on four hits while striking out seven. In the top of the seventh, the Dodgers had the bases loaded with two outs following two walks and a hit batsman; Chris Taylor then drove in two runs with a double off of Luke Jackson, putting Los Angeles ahead, 4–2. With one out in the bottom of the eighth, Ozzie Albies singled off of Julio Urías to drive in Eddie Rosario from second, pulling Atlanta within a run, 4–3. Riley then doubled to deep center, scoring Albies from first and tying the game, 4–4. Atlanta closer Will Smith retired the Dodgers in order in the top of the ninth. Brusdar Graterol came in to pitch the bottom of the ninth; he recorded two outs and, with Dansby Swanson at second, was replaced by Dodgers closer Kenley Jansen. Rosario hit Jansen's first pitch up the middle, getting by Seager and driving in Swanson to give the Braves a 2–0 series lead.

=== Game 3 ===
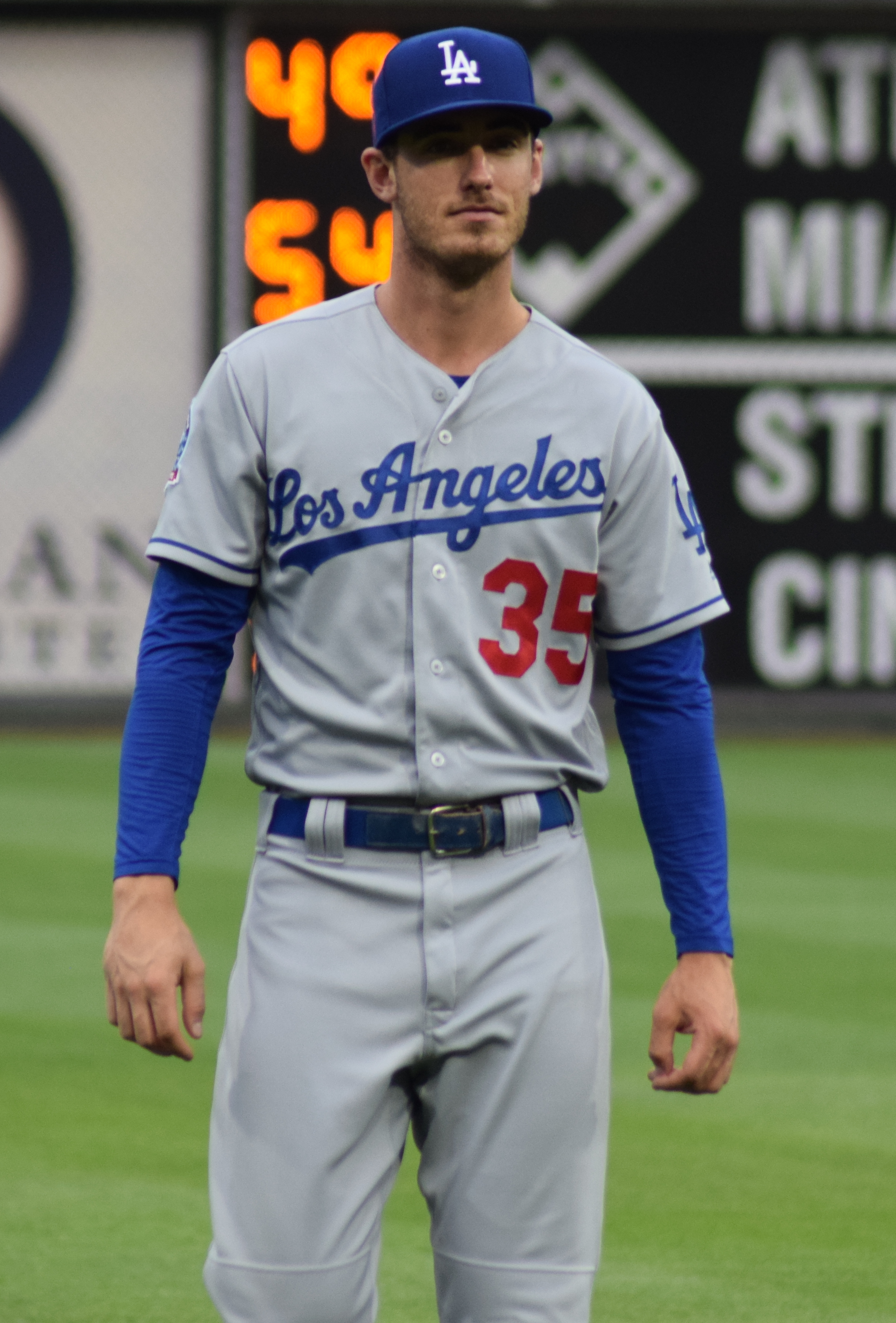
Cody Bellinger had a three-run home run as part of an eighth-inning rally for the Dodgers in Game 3.

October 19, 2021 2:08 pm (PDT) at Dodger Stadium in Los Angeles, California 67 °F (19 °C), mostly clear
Team	1	2	3	4	5	6	7	8	9	R	H	E
Atlanta	0	0	0	4	1	0	0	0	0	5	12	0
Los Angeles	2	0	0	0	0	0	0	4	X	6	10	0
WP: Tony Gonsolin (1–0) LP: Luke Jackson (0–1) Sv: Kenley Jansen (1); Home runs: ATL: None; LAD: Corey Seager (2), Cody Bellinger (1); Attendance: 51,307; Boxscore

Starting pitchers were Walker Buehler for Los Angeles and Charlie Morton for Atlanta. In the bottom of the first, Mookie Betts walked, then Corey Seager homered, giving the Dodgers an early 2–0 lead, as had been the case in Game 2. The Braves rallied back, scoring four runs in the top of the fourth inning. Freddie Freeman singled to open the inning, and with one out Austin Riley doubled. Joc Pederson then singled to score Freeman. Adam Duvall subsequently singled to score Riley and tie the game. Travis d'Arnaud walked to load the bases, then Dansby Swanson singled to give the Braves a 3–2 lead. The final run of the inning came on a walk to Eddie Rosario that forced in a run. The Braves extended their lead in the top of the fifth with an RBI single by Duvall to bring Ozzie Albies in, making the score 5–2. In the bottom of the eighth, a three-run homer by Cody Bellinger with one out tied the game, 5–5. Betts doubled with two outs, scoring Chris Taylor who had singled, to give the Dodgers a 6–5 lead. Dodgers closer Kenley Jansen came in and struck out the side in the top of the ninth, giving the Dodgers their first win of the series. The Braves used five pitchers, with Morton leaving after five innings having allowed two runs on three hits; Luke Jackson, who was charged with all four eighth-inning runs, took the loss. The Dodgers used nine pitchers, with Buehler leaving after 3 2/3 innings having allowed four runs on seven hits. Tony Gonsolin, who recorded the final out in the top of the eighth, got the win, while Jansen earned the save.

Bellinger's home run in the eighth was just the third home run in Dodgers history that tied a postseason game in the eighth inning or later, joining Mike Scioscia’s in the ninth inning of 1988 NLCS Game 4 and Carl Furillo’s in Game 6 of the 1953 World Series.

=== Game 4 ===
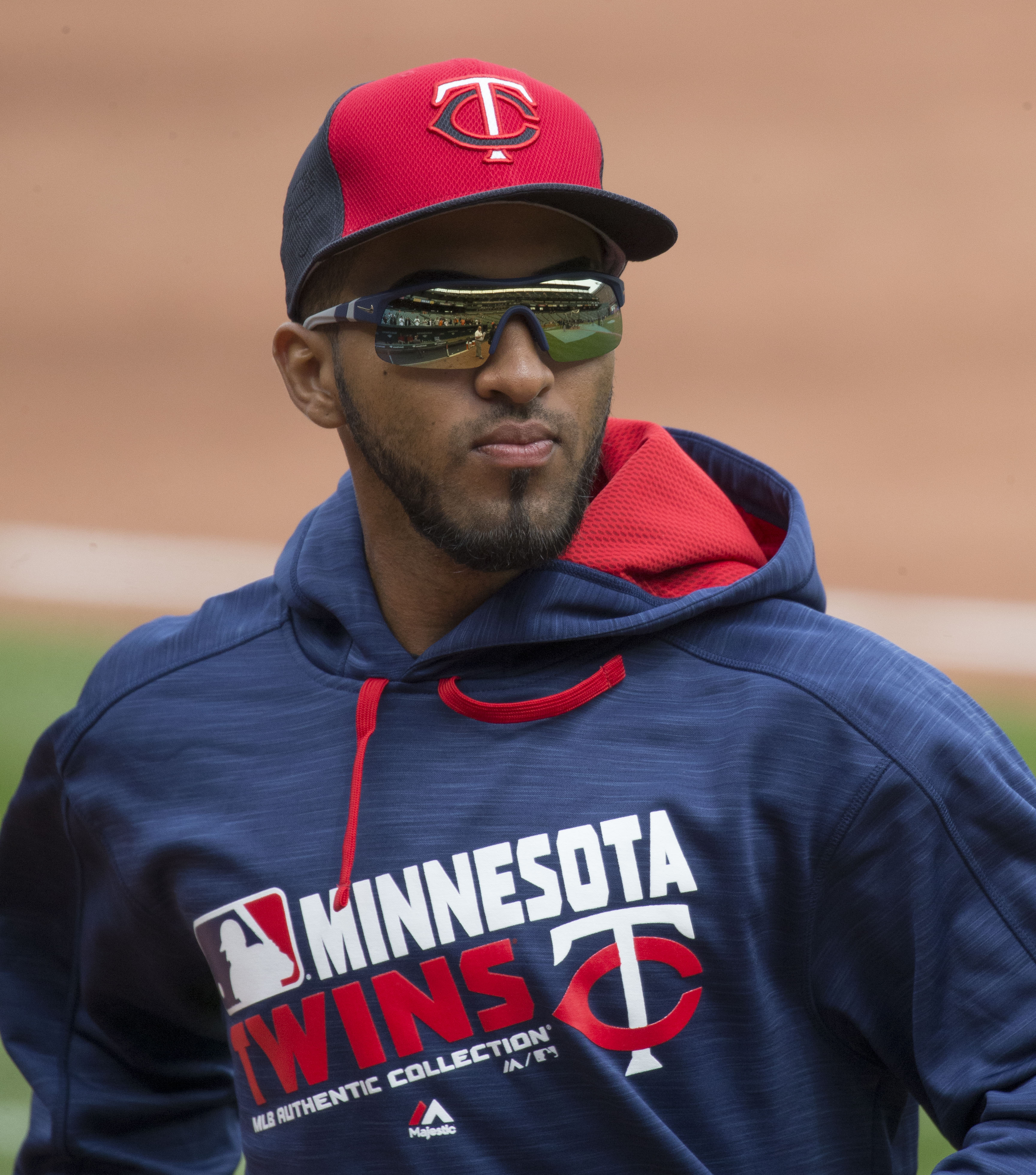
Eddie Rosario, shown with the Twins, had four hits in Game 4, including two home runs.

October 20, 2021 5:10 pm (PDT) at Dodger Stadium in Los Angeles, California 64 °F (18 °C), partly cloudy
Team	1	2	3	4	5	6	7	8	9	R	H	E
Atlanta	0	2	2	0	1	0	0	0	4	9	12	0
Los Angeles	0	0	0	0	2	0	0	0	0	2	4	1
WP: Drew Smyly (1–0) LP: Julio Urías (0–1); Home runs: ATL: Eddie Rosario 2 (2), Adam Duvall (1), Freddie Freeman (1); LAD: None; Attendance: 53,025; Boxscore

Julio Urías started for the Dodgers and Jesse Chavez acted as an opener for the Braves. Huascar Ynoa had planned to open for the Braves, but he was replaced on Atlanta's roster earlier in the day due to right shoulder discomfort. Atlanta took a 2–0 lead in the top of the second on back-to-back solo home runs by Eddie Rosario and Adam Duvall. A solo homer by Freddie Freeman in the top of the third, along with a Rosario triple and a Joc Pederson single to drive him in, extended the lead to 4–0. With runners on first and third with one out in the top of the fifth, Duvall hit a sacrifice fly to make it 5–0. The Dodgers got two runs back in the bottom of the fifth; with two outs and runners on second and third, A. J. Pollock singled, trimming Atlanta's lead to 5–2. In the bottom of the seventh inning, Dodgers third baseman Justin Turner exited with a hamstring injury after grounding into a double play. In the top of the ninth, Dansby Swanson singled, stole second, and was driven in by a Freeman ground rule double, extending Atlanta's lead to 6–2. Rosario's second home run of the game, with two men on base, made it 9–2. Rosario collected four hits in the game and was a double short of hitting for the cycle, which would have been only the second cycle in postseason history. With a scoreless bottom of the ninth, the Braves took a 3–1 lead in the series. Drew Smyly, the second of six Braves pitchers, got the win after pitching 3 1/3 innings and allowing two runs on two hits. Urías, who pitched five innings for the Dodgers, allowed five runs on eight hits and took the loss.

=== Game 5 ===
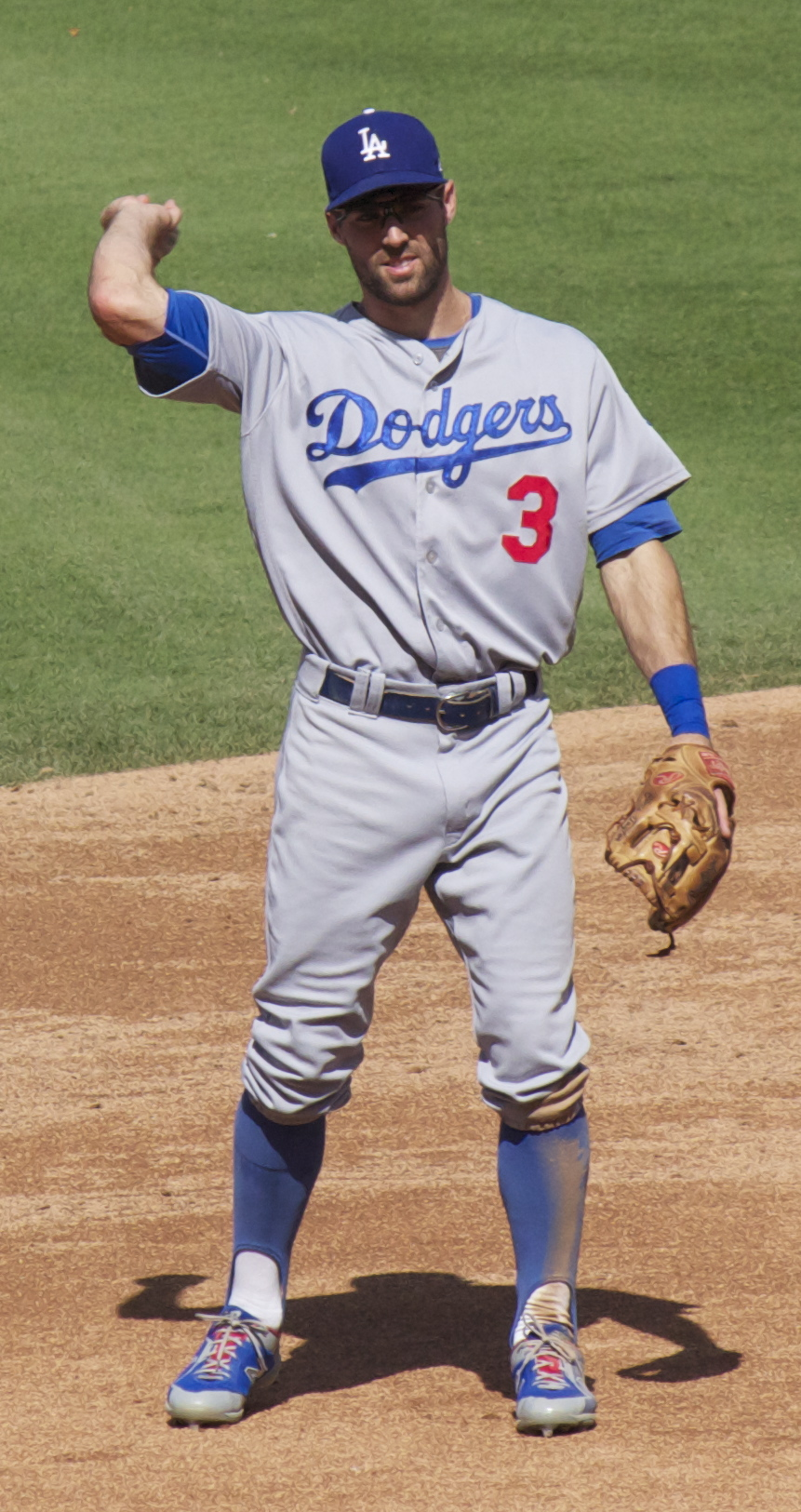
Chris Taylor hit three home runs in Game 5.

October 21, 2021 5:08 pm (PDT) at Dodger Stadium in Los Angeles, California 64 °F (18 °C), mostly cloudy
Team	1	2	3	4	5	6	7	8	9	R	H	E
Atlanta	2	0	0	0	0	0	0	0	0	2	5	0
Los Angeles	0	3	1	0	2	0	1	4	X	11	17	0
WP: Evan Phillips (1–0) LP: Max Fried (0–1); Home runs: ATL: Freddie Freeman (2); LAD: A. J. Pollock 2 (2), Chris Taylor 3 (3); Attendance: 51,363; Boxscore

Before the game, Justin Turner was removed from the Dodgers' playoff roster, due to a hamstring injury, and was replaced by Andy Burns. The Braves removed Cristian Pache from their roster, adding Jorge Soler who had been on the COVID-19-related injured list.

Starting pitchers were Joe Kelly acting as an opener for Los Angeles and Max Fried for Atlanta. Ozzie Albies singled with one out in the top of the first, then Freddie Freeman homered to give the Braves an early 2–0 lead. Kelly left with two outs, due to right bicep tightness, and was relieved by Evan Phillips. A. J. Pollock led off the bottom of the second with a solo home run; he was followed by Albert Pujols who singled, then Chris Taylor homered to put the Dodgers ahead, 3–2. With one out in the bottom of the third, the Dodgers had consecutive singles from Pollock, Pujols, and Taylor, adding a run to make it 4–2. With two outs in the bottom of the fifth, Pujols walked and was followed by Taylor's second home run of the game, extending the Dodgers' lead to 6–2. With two outs in the bottom of the seventh, Taylor hit his third home run, a solo shot making it a 7–2 game. Only ten players had previously hit three home runs in a playoff game, the first being Babe Ruth in 1926 and the last being Enrique Hernández in 2017. In the bottom of the eighth, Mookie Betts led off with single, stole second, and scored on a single by Trea Turner. With one out, Pollock hit his second home run of the game, coming with two men on base to grow the lead to 11–2. Taylor batted with two outs in the bottom of the eighth; with an opportunity to be the first player with four home runs in a playoff game, he struck out against Braves pitcher Jacob Webb. Dodgers closer Kenley Jansen pitched the top of the ninth, retiring the side in order as the Dodgers avoided elimination.

=== Game 6 ===
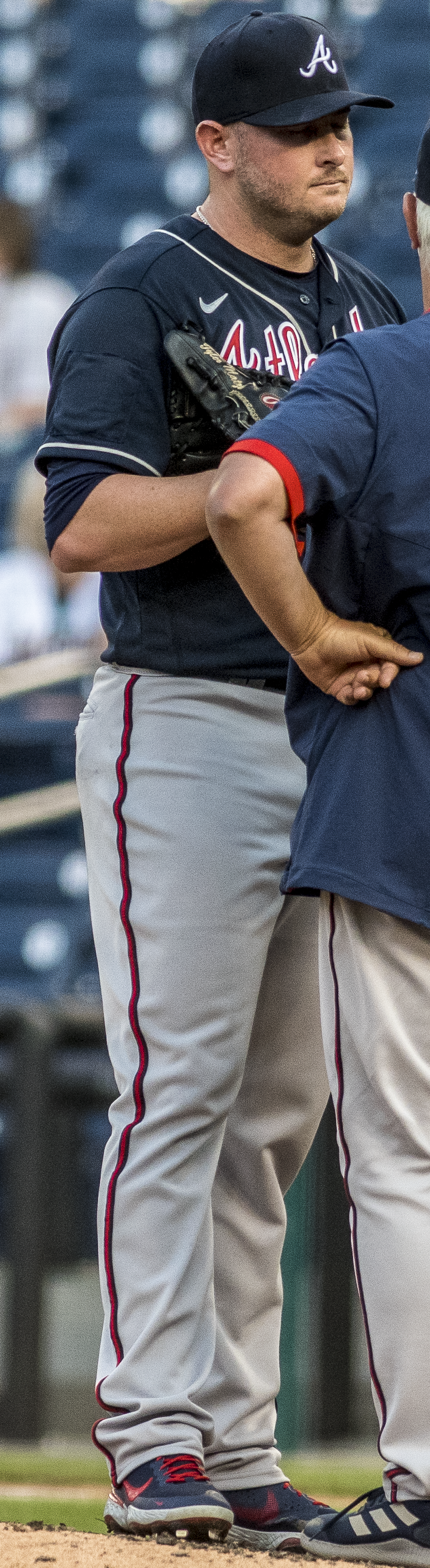
Tyler Matzek was the winning pitcher of Game 6.

October 23, 2021 8:09 pm (EDT) at Truist Park in Atlanta, Georgia 66 °F (19 °C), clear
Team	1	2	3	4	5	6	7	8	9	R	H	E
Los Angeles	0	0	0	1	0	0	1	0	0	2	5	0
Atlanta	1	0	0	3	0	0	0	0	X	4	9	0
WP: Tyler Matzek (1–0) LP: Walker Buehler (0–1) Sv: Will Smith (1); Home runs: LAD: None; ATL: Eddie Rosario (3); Attendance: 43,060; Boxscore

Prior to the game, the Dodgers added David Price to their roster, replacing Joe Kelly due to right biceps tightness. Max Scherzer had been expected to start for the Dodgers, but he was scratched following reports of an arm issue. On the morning of the game, the Dodgers announced that Walker Buehler would start on three days rest; he had pitched 3 2/3 innings in Game 3. Ian Anderson started for Atlanta. The Braves took a 1–0 lead in the bottom of the first, on back-to-back two-out doubles by Ozzie Albies and Austin Riley. The Dodgers tied the game in the top of the fourth, as Cody Bellinger hit a two-out single with runners on first and second, scoring Trea Turner. Anderson was lifted in favor of pinch hitter Ehire Adrianza in the bottom of the fourth inning. After Adrianza doubled with two outs, putting runners at second and third, Eddie Rosario hit a home run to put Atlanta back in the lead, 4–1. Brusdar Graterol relieved Buehler for the bottom of the fifth inning. The Dodgers opened the seventh inning with a double by Chris Taylor and a walk by Bellinger; A. J. Pollock then doubled down the left-field line, driving in Taylor and leaving runners at second and third with no one out, and Braves' lead reduced to 4–2. The Braves' Tyler Matzek entered to pitch, relieving Luke Jackson, and struck out Albert Pujols, Steven Souza Jr., and Mookie Betts to end the threat. Matzek returned to pitch the top of the eighth and retired the side in order. Pinch hitter Jorge Soler led off the bottom of the eighth with a double off of Dodgers closer Kenley Jansen. Although Atlanta had runners at first and third with one out, then second and third with two outs, Jansen did not allow the Braves to add to their lead. Braves closer Will Smith came in to pitch the top of the ninth with a two-run lead. Smith struck out Taylor and Bellinger for the first two outs; Pollock then grounded out to Dansby Swanson to end the game and send the Braves to the World Series for the first time since 1999.

After the game, the Braves' Rosario was named NLCS MVP; he collected 14 hits in the series, tying him with four other players (Hideki Matsui, Albert Pujols, Marco Scutaro, and Kevin Youkilis) for the major league record of most hits in a postseason series.

=== Composite line score ===
2021 NLCS (4–2): Atlanta Braves beat Los Angeles Dodgers

Team	1	2	3	4	5	6	7	8	9	R	H	E
Los Angeles Dodgers	4	4	1	2	4	0	4	8	0	27	50	1
Atlanta Braves	4	2	2	10	2	0	0	2	6	28	54	0
Total attendance: 282,443 Average attendance: 47,074

== Aftermath ==
During the off-season, the Dodgers signed Freddie Freeman away from the Braves. Playing in his first game against Atlanta at Truist Park on June 26, Freeman received a minute long standing-ovation before his first at-bat where he broke down and cried. Freeman's free agency proved to be controversial when it was revealed a few days later by sports talk radio host Doug Gottlieb that Freeman's agent Casey Close had never informed Freeman of the Braves’ final offer, which was the same amount he eventually signed for with the Dodgers. Close, who Freeman cut ties with due to how his free-agent negotiations played out, filed a lawsuit against Gottlieb in July alleging defamation. However, before the case could come before a judge, Doug Gottlieb recanted his statement in September via Twitter, stating he "prematurely reported on the events and simply got it wrong". On the same day, Close and Excel Sports Agency announced they dropped the libel case against Gottlieb.

Like Freeman, Kenley Jansen would join the opposition by signing a one year free-agent contract with Atlanta. The former catcher turned ace reliever left Los Angeles as the all-time leader in saves for the club.

Both the Braves and Dodgers won 100-plus games in 2022 and 2023, but neither team won a playoff round in those years. In 2024, the Dodgers broke this trend of disappointment, getting out of the NLDS (the first time a higher-seeded team won a round in the NLDS since the Braves and Dodgers both did so in 2020) and eventually winning the World Series, with Freeman winning a World Series MVP.

The Dodgers won the next postseason meeting between the two teams (their sixth overall) in the 2026 NLDS. The all-time postseason series now stands at 4–2, Dodgers.

== See also ==
- 2021 American League Championship Series
