= 2021 Major League Baseball postseason =

2021 Major League Baseball playoffs

Tournament details
- Dates: October 5 – November 2, 2021
- Teams: 10

Final positions
- Champions: Atlanta Braves (4th title)
- Runners-up: Houston Astros

Tournament statistics
- Most HRs: Four tied (5)
- Most SBs: Mookie Betts (LAD) (6)
- Most Ks (as pitcher): Max Fried (ATL) (29)

Awards
- MVP: Jorge Soler (ATL)

The 2021 Major League Baseball postseason was the playoff tournament of Major League Baseball (MLB) for the 2021 season. The winners of the Division Series advanced to the League Championship Series to determine the pennant winners that face each other in the World Series. After the 2020 postseason, MLB returned to a 10-team playoff format following the loosening of COVID-19 pandemic restrictions. This was the last postseason to feature the 10–team format, as the league expanded to a 12–team format for the 2022 postseason.

In the American League, the Houston Astros and New York Yankees both returned to the postseason for the sixth time in the previous seven years, the Tampa Bay Rays returned for the third year in a row, the Chicago White Sox made their second straight appearance, and the Boston Red Sox returned for the fourth time in the previous six years.

In the National League, the Los Angeles Dodgers returned to the postseason for the ninth straight time, the Atlanta Braves and Milwaukee Brewers returned for the fourth year in a row, the St. Louis Cardinals returned for the third straight time, and the San Francisco Giants made their first appearance since 2016. This was the fourth postseason in the previous five years to feature at least three 100-win teams.

The postseason began on October 5, and ended on November 2, with the Braves defeating the Astros in six games in the 2021 World Series. It was the first title for the Braves since 1995 and fourth overall.

== Playoff seeds ==
American League Teams National League Teams

The following teams qualified for the postseason:

=== American League ===
1. Tampa Bay Rays – 100–62, AL East champions
2. Houston Astros – 95–67, AL West champions
3. Chicago White Sox – 93–69, AL Central champions
4. Boston Red Sox – 92–70 (10–9 head-to-head record vs. NYY)
5. New York Yankees – 92–70 (9–10 head-to-head record vs. BOS)

=== National League ===
1. San Francisco Giants – 107–55, NL West champions
2. Milwaukee Brewers – 95–67, NL Central champions
3. Atlanta Braves – 88–73, NL East champions
4. Los Angeles Dodgers – 106–56
5. St. Louis Cardinals – 90–72

== Playoff bracket ==
Wild Card Games (ALWC, NLWC)
4	Boston	1
5	NY Yankees	0
4	LA Dodgers	1
5	St. Louis	0

Division Series (ALDS, NLDS)
1	Tampa Bay	1
4	Boston	3
American League
2	Houston	3
3	Chicago White Sox	1
1	San Francisco	2
4	LA Dodgers	3
National League
2	Milwaukee	1
3	Atlanta	3

League Championship Series (ALCS, NLCS)
4	Boston	2
2	Houston	4
4	LA Dodgers	2
3	Atlanta	4

World Series
AL2	Houston	2
NL3	Atlanta	4

== American League Wild Card ==
=== (4) Boston Red Sox vs. (5) New York Yankees ===
Tuesday, October 5, 2021 8:11 pm (EDT) at Fenway Park in Boston, Massachusetts
Team	1	2	3	4	5	6	7	8	9	R	H	E
New York	0	0	0	0	0	1	0	0	1	2	6	0
Boston	2	0	1	0	0	1	2	0	X	6	7	0
WP: Nathan Eovaldi (1–0) LP: Gerrit Cole (0–1); Home runs: NYY: Anthony Rizzo (1), Giancarlo Stanton (1); BOS: Xander Bogaerts (1), Kyle Schwarber (1); Attendance: 38,324; Boxscore

This was the fifth postseason meeting in the history of the Red Sox–Yankees rivalry (1999, 2003, 2004, 2018). The Red Sox defeated the Yankees 6–2 to advance to the ALDS for the second time in four years.

With the win, the Red Sox moved up to 3–2 all time meetings against the Yankees in the postseason, and became just the third team to win three consecutive postseason series against the Yankees, joining the Detroit Tigers (2006, 2011, 2012) and Houston Astros (2015, 2017, 2019).

== National League Wild Card ==
=== (4) Los Angeles Dodgers vs. (5) St. Louis Cardinals ===
Wednesday, October 6, 2021 5:10 pm (PDT) at Dodger Stadium in Los Angeles, California
Team	1	2	3	4	5	6	7	8	9	R	H	E
St. Louis	1	0	0	0	0	0	0	0	0	1	5	0
Los Angeles	0	0	0	1	0	0	0	0	2	3	7	1
WP: Kenley Jansen (1–0) LP: T. J. McFarland (0–1); Home runs: STL: None; LAD: Justin Turner (1), Chris Taylor (1); Attendance: 53,193; Boxscore

This was the sixth postseason meeting in the history of the Cardinals-Dodgers rivalry (1985, 2004, 2009, 2013, 2014). The Dodgers defeated the Cardinals to return to the NLDS for the ninth year in a row.

The game remained tied into the bottom of the ninth, when the Dodgers' Chris Taylor hit a walk-off two-run homer off Alex Reyes, giving the Dodgers a 3–1 victory.

== American League Division Series ==
=== (1) Tampa Bay Rays vs. (4) Boston Red Sox ===
Boston won the series, 3–1.

Game	Date	Score	Location	Time	Attendance
1	October 7	Boston Red Sox – 0, Tampa Bay Rays – 5	Tropicana Field	3:06	27,419
2	October 8	Boston Red Sox – 14, Tampa Bay Rays – 6	Tropicana Field	3:56	37,616
3	October 10	Tampa Bay Rays – 4, Boston Red Sox – 6 (13)	Fenway Park	5:14	37,224
4	October 11	Tampa Bay Rays – 5, Boston Red Sox – 6	Fenway Park	3:25	38,447

This was the third postseason meeting in the history of the Rays–Red Sox rivalry (2008, 2013). The Red Sox defeated the defending American League champion Rays to advance to the ALCS for the second time in five years.

Shane McClanahan pitched five solid innings as the Rays shut out the Red Sox in Game 1. In Game 2, five different players - Xander Bogaerts, Alex Verdugo, Kiké Hernández, J. D. Martinez and Rafael Devers - all homered for the Red Sox as they blew out the Rays in Game 2 to even the series headed to Boston. In a long and wild Game 3, the Red Sox narrowly won in the bottom of the thirteenth inning as Christian Vázquez hit a walk-off two—run home run to give them the series lead. In Game 4, the Red Sox jumped out to a 5–0 lead early, but it was erased by the eighth inning as the Rays rallied to tie the game. However, the Red Sox won the game and the series thanks to a sacrifice fly from Hernández.

To date, this is the most recent playoff series victory by the Red Sox.

=== (2) Houston Astros vs. (3) Chicago White Sox ===
Houston won the series, 3–1.

Game	Date	Score	Location	Time	Attendance
1	October 7	Chicago White Sox – 1, Houston Astros – 6	Minute Maid Park	3:34	40,497
2	October 8	Chicago White Sox – 4, Houston Astros – 9	Minute Maid Park	3:52	41,315
3	October 10	Houston Astros – 6, Chicago White Sox – 12	Guaranteed Rate Field	4:27	40,288
4	October 12	Houston Astros – 10, Chicago White Sox – 1	Guaranteed Rate Field	4:32	40,170

This was the second postseason meeting between the Astros and White Sox. When the team was still in the National League, the Astros met the White Sox in the 2005 World Series, which the White Sox won in a sweep to end the Curse of the Black Sox. The Astros defeated the White Sox in four games to advance to the ALCS for the fifth year in a row.

Lance McCullers Jr. pitched seven solid innings in Game 1 as the Astros blew out the White Sox in Game 1. The Astros’ offense came alive in Game 2 as they would proceed in another blowout win to go up 2–0 in the series headed to Chicago. In Game 3, Leury García and Yasmani Grandal both hit home runs and a combined seven RBIs as the White Sox blew out the Astros to get on the board in the series. However, the Astros responded with a blowout win of their own in Game 4 to close out the series and advance.

== National League Division Series ==
=== (1) San Francisco Giants vs. (4) Los Angeles Dodgers ===
Los Angeles won the series, 3–2.

Game	Date	Score	Location	Time	Attendance
1	October 8	Los Angeles Dodgers – 0, San Francisco Giants – 4	Oracle Park	2:39	41,934
2	October 9	Los Angeles Dodgers – 9, San Francisco Giants – 2	Oracle Park	3:27	42,275
3	October 11	San Francisco Giants – 1, Los Angeles Dodgers – 0	Dodger Stadium	3:08	53,299
4	October 12	San Francisco Giants – 2, Los Angeles Dodgers – 7	Dodger Stadium	3:38	52,935
5	October 14	Los Angeles Dodgers – 2, San Francisco Giants – 1	Oracle Park	3:26	42,275

This was the first postseason meeting in the history of the Dodgers–Giants rivalry, and the first NLDS series between two teams that had won 100 games or more in the regular season. The Dodgers upset the MLB-best Giants in five games to advance to the NLCS for the eighth time in the past thirteen years.

Logan Webb allowed only five hits in 7 2/3 scoreless innings as the Giants took Game 1 in a shutout. In Game 2, the Dodgers blew out the Giants to even the series headed to Los Angeles. Alex Wood and three San Francisco relievers shut out the Dodgers again in Game 3 to retake the series lead. Mookie Betts and Will Smith both homered for the Dodgers in Game 4 as they blew out the Giants again to send the series back to San Francisco for a decisive fifth game. Game 5 was a pitchers’ duel between both teams’ bullpens, which was won by the Dodgers as they narrowly held off the Giants in the bottom of the ninth inning.

To date, this is the last time the Giants have appeared in the postseason.

=== (2) Milwaukee Brewers vs. (3) Atlanta Braves ===
Atlanta won the series, 3–1.

Game	Date	Score	Location	Time	Attendance
1	October 8	Atlanta Braves – 1, Milwaukee Brewers – 2	American Family Field	3:00	40,852
2	October 9	Atlanta Braves – 3, Milwaukee Brewers – 0	American Family Field	3:23	43,812
3	October 11	Milwaukee Brewers – 0, Atlanta Braves – 3	Truist Park	3:20	41,479
4	October 12	Milwaukee Brewers – 4, Atlanta Braves – 5	Truist Park	3:53	40,195

The Braves defeated the Brewers in four games to advance to the NLCS for the second year in a row.

Game 1 was a pitchers’ duel between both teams’ bullpens, which was won by the Brewers as they narrowly won. Game 2 was another pitchers’ duel between Atlanta's Max Fried and Milwaukee's Brandon Woodruff, which was won by the former as the Braves won 3–0 to even the series headed to Atlanta. In Game 3, the Braves again shut out the Brewers by an identical 3–0 score thanks to a three—run home run from Joc Pederson to take the series lead. Game 4 was an offensive showdown between both teams, which was won by the Braves as Freddie Freeman put the Braves ahead for good with a solo home run in the bottom of the eighth to advance to the NLCS.

== American League Championship Series ==
=== (4) Boston Red Sox vs. (2) Houston Astros ===
Houston won the series, 4–2.

Game	Date	Score	Location	Time	Attendance
1	October 15	Boston Red Sox – 4, Houston Astros – 5	Minute Maid Park	4:07	40,534
2	October 16	Boston Red Sox – 9, Houston Astros – 5	Minute Maid Park	4:08	41,476
3	October 18	Houston Astros – 3, Boston Red Sox – 12	Fenway Park	3:16	37,603
4	October 19	Houston Astros – 9, Boston Red Sox – 2	Fenway Park	4:04	38,010
5	October 20	Houston Astros – 9, Boston Red Sox – 1	Fenway Park	3:32	37,599
6	October 22	Boston Red Sox – 0, Houston Astros – 5	Minute Maid Park	3:28	42,718

This was the third postseason meeting between the Red Sox and Astros. The two teams split the previous two meetings, in the ALDS in 2017 (won by the Astros), and the ALCS in 2018 (won by the Red Sox). In both instances, the winner was the eventual World Series champion. The Astros defeated the Red Sox in six games to advance to the World Series for the third time in five years.

In Game 1, the Astros overcame a late Red Sox lead to win thanks to two home runs from Jose Altuve and Carlos Correa respectively across innings six and seven. In Game 2, J.D. Martinez and Rafael Devers made MLB history, as they hit back-to-back grand slams in the first two innings to give them a lead they wouldn't relinquish as they evened the series headed to Boston, which made the Red Sox the first team to hit back-to-back grand slams in a postseason game. In Game 3, the Red Sox blew out the Astros to take the series lead. Then, everything went wrong for the Red Sox as the Astros responded with back-to-back blowout wins in Games 4 and 5 to send the series back to Houston. In Game 5, Luis García pitched five innings of no-hit ball, and the Astros bullpen stymied the Sox offense the rest of the way to clinch the pennant.

The Astros would win their next and most recent pennant the next year in a sweep over the New York Yankees en route to a World Series title.

As of 2026, this is the last postseason appearance outside of the Wild Card round for the Red Sox.

== National League Championship Series ==
=== (3) Atlanta Braves vs. (4) Los Angeles Dodgers ===
Atlanta won the series, 4–2.

Game	Date	Score	Location	Time	Attendance
1	October 16	Los Angeles Dodgers – 2, Atlanta Braves – 3	Truist Park	3:04	41,815
2	October 17	Los Angeles Dodgers – 4, Atlanta Braves – 5	Truist Park	3:56	41,873
3	October 19	Atlanta Braves – 5, Los Angeles Dodgers – 6	Dodger Stadium	4:14	51,307
4	October 20	Atlanta Braves – 9, Los Angeles Dodgers – 2	Dodger Stadium	3:27	53,025
5	October 21	Atlanta Braves – 2, Los Angeles Dodgers – 11	Dodger Stadium	3:33	51,363
6	October 23	Los Angeles Dodgers – 2, Atlanta Braves – 4	Truist Park	3:32	43,060

This was the fifth postseason meeting between the Dodgers and Braves (1996, 2013, 2018, 2020). The Dodgers won the last three meetings (2013, 2018, 2020). In a significant upset given their regular season win differential, the 88-win Braves defeated the defending World Series champions - the 106-win Dodgers, in six games to return to the World Series for the first time since 1999 (in the process denying a rematch of the 2017 World Series between the Astros and Dodgers).

Ozzie Albies hit a one-out bloop single off of Blake Treinen, stole second, and then scored on a Riley single to left to win Game 1 for the Braves. In Game 2, the Braves came from behind late to win thanks to an RBI from Eddie Rosario to take a 2–0 series lead headed to Los Angeles. In Game 3, the Braves lead 5–2 going into the bottom of the eighth, but the Dodgers rallied with four unanswered runs - a three-run homer from Cody Bellinger and an RBI double from Mookie Betts - and won. The Braves then blew out the Dodgers in Game 4 to take a 3–1 series lead. However, the Dodgers responded with a blowout win of their own in Game 5, in part thanks to three home runs from Chris Taylor, to send the series back to Atlanta. In Game 6, Rosario put the Braves ahead for good with a three-run homer to clinch the pennant.

The Dodgers would return to the NLCS again in 2024, and defeated the New York Mets in six games en route to a World Series title.

In 2023, the Braves’ upset of the Dodgers was ranked as the fourth biggest upset in postseason history by MLB.com. As of 2026, this is the last time the Braves won the NL pennant.

Both teams would meet again in the NLDS in 2026, in which the Dodgers defeated the Braves in four games.

== 2021 World Series ==
=== (AL2) Houston Astros vs. (NL3) Atlanta Braves ===
Atlanta won the series, 4–2.

Game	Date	Score	Location	Time	Attendance
1	October 26	Atlanta Braves – 6, Houston Astros – 2	Minute Maid Park	4:06	42,825
2	October 27	Atlanta Braves – 2, Houston Astros – 7	Minute Maid Park	3:11	42,833
3	October 29	Houston Astros – 0, Atlanta Braves – 2	Truist Park	3:24	42,898
4	October 30	Houston Astros – 2, Atlanta Braves – 3	Truist Park	3:45	43,125
5	October 31	Houston Astros – 9, Atlanta Braves – 5	Truist Park	4:00	43,122
6	November 2	Atlanta Braves – 7, Houston Astros – 0	Minute Maid Park	3:22	42,868

This was the first World Series played entirely in the Deep South. The Astros and Braves had previously met in the postseason five times, all of which were in the NLDS when the Astros were still a National League team. Of those five series, the Braves won three (1997, 1999, and 2001) while the Astros won two (2004 and 2005). The Braves defeated the Astros in six games, capturing their first World Series title since 1995.

Jorge Soler and Adam Duvall both homered for the Braves as they stole Game 1 on the road. The Astros blew out the Braves in Game 2 to even the series headed to Atlanta. Ian Anderson and the Braves’ bullpen pitched a no-hitter through seven innings as they shut out the Astros 2–0 to regain the series lead in Game 3. In Game 4, the Astros led 2–0 after the top of the sixth, but the Braves rallied with three unanswered runs from home runs from Soler and Dansby Swanson to win and take a 3–1 series lead. In Game 5, the Braves jumped out to a big early lead, but the Astros rallied to win and send the series back to Houston. However, Soler, Swanson and Freddie Freeman all homered as the Braves blew out the Astros in Game 6 to clinch the championship. This was the third consecutive World Series won by the National League.

With the win, the Braves moved up to 4–2 all time against the Astros in the postseason. As of 2026, this remains the last postseason appearance outside of the divisional round for the Braves.

With the loss, the Astros' record in the World Series fell to 1–3, with all three losses occurring at their home venue, Minute Maid Park. The Astros returned to the World Series the next year, and defeated the Philadelphia Phillies in six games to win their most recent championship.

== Broadcasting ==
This was eighth and final year of the U.S. TV contracts with ESPN, Fox Sports, and TBS. ESPN aired the American League Wild Card Game, Fox Sports 1 and MLB Network split the American League Division Series, and the Fox broadcast network and Fox Sports 1 split the American League Championship Series. TBS had the National League Wild Card Game, Division Series, and Championship Series, with sister network TNT used as an overflow channel. The World Series then aired on the Fox broadcast network for the 22nd consecutive year.

Under the three broadcasters' renewed TV deals lasting from 2022 until 2028, among other changes, ESPN was awarded the rights to all Wild Card round games, and Fox took over the selected Division Series games that were held by MLB Network.

=== Most watched playoff games ===
All times Eastern.

Rank	Round	Date	Game	Matchup			TV network(s)	Viewers (millions)
1	World Series	Tuesday, November 2, 8:00 p.m.	Game 6	Atlanta Braves	7–0	Houston Astros	Fox	13.968
2	World Series	Sunday, October 31, 8:00 p.m.	Game 5	Houston Astros	9–5	Atlanta Braves	Fox	13.644
3	World Series	Friday, October 29, 8:00 p.m.	Game 3	Houston Astros	0–2	Atlanta Braves	Fox	11.232
4	World Series	Tuesday, October 26, 8:00 p.m.	Game 1	Atlanta Braves	6–2	Houston Astros	Fox	10.811
5	World Series	Saturday, October 30, 8:00 p.m.	Game 4	Houston Astros	2–3	Atlanta Braves	Fox	10.511
6	World Series	Tuesday, October 26, 8:00 p.m.	Game 2	Atlanta Braves	2–7	Houston Astros	Fox	10.280
7	ALWC	Tuesday, October 5, 8:00 p.m.	—N/a	New York Yankees	2–6	Boston Red Sox	ESPN; ESPN2	7.690
8	NLCS	Saturday, October 23, 8:00 p.m.	Game 6	Los Angeles Dodgers	2–4	Atlanta Braves	TBS	6.949
9	NLWC	Wednesday, October 6, 8:00 p.m.	—N/a	St. Louis Cardinals	1–3	Los Angeles Dodgers	TBS	6.673
10	NLDS	Thursday, October 14, 9:00 p.m.	Game 5	San Francisco Giants	2–1	Los Angeles Dodgers	TBS	6.500
