= James Hoye =

American baseball umpire (born 1971)

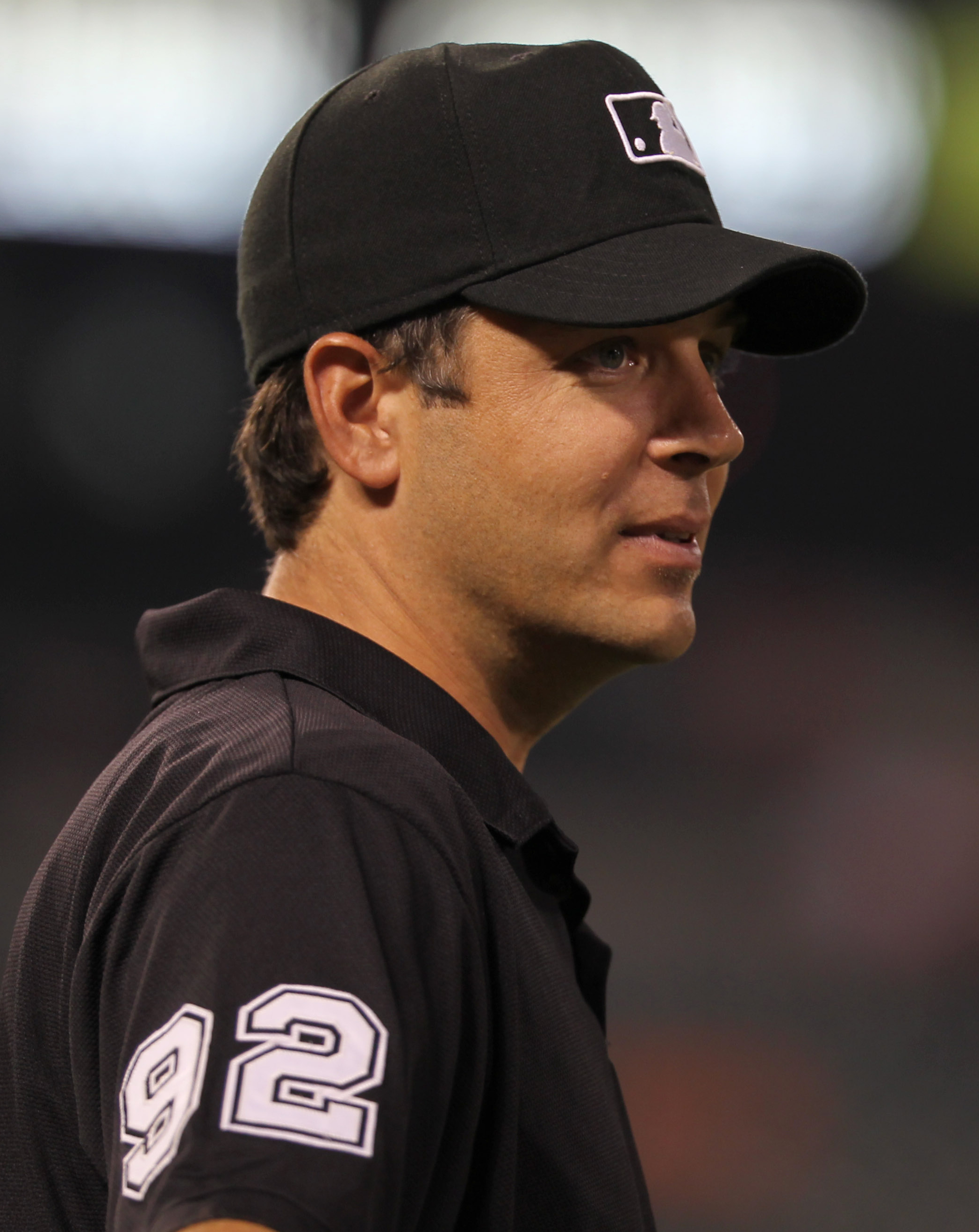
- Hoye in 2011

MLB – No. 92
- Umpire
- Born: February 8, 1971 (age 55); Parma, Ohio, U.S.

MLB debut
- June 8, 2003

Crew information
- Umpiring crew: E
- Crew members: #92 James Hoye (crew chief); #17 D. J. Reyburn; #84 John Libka; #29 Sean Barber

Career highlights and awards
- Special Assignments: World Series (2019, 2022, 2026); League Championship Series (2018, 2020, 2021, 2023, 2025); Division Series (2011, 2015, 2019, 2022, 2024, 2026); Wild Card Games/Series (2014, 2018, 2020, 2021, 2023); All-Star Game (2015, 2024); World Baseball Classic (2006)

James Patrick Hoye (born February 8, 1971) is an American umpire in Major League Baseball. He wears number 92. Hoye worked as an MLB reserve umpire from 2003 to 2009 for both the American and National Leagues. He was hired to the full-time Major League staff prior to the 2010 season. Hoye has worked two All-Star Games (2015, 2024), three World Series (2019, 2022, 2026), five League Championship Series (2018, 2020, 2021, 2023, 2025), six Division Series (2011, 2015, 2019, 2022, 2024, 2026), and five Wild Card Games/Series (2014, 2018, 2020, 2021, 2023). He was promoted to crew chief in 2023.

== Career ==
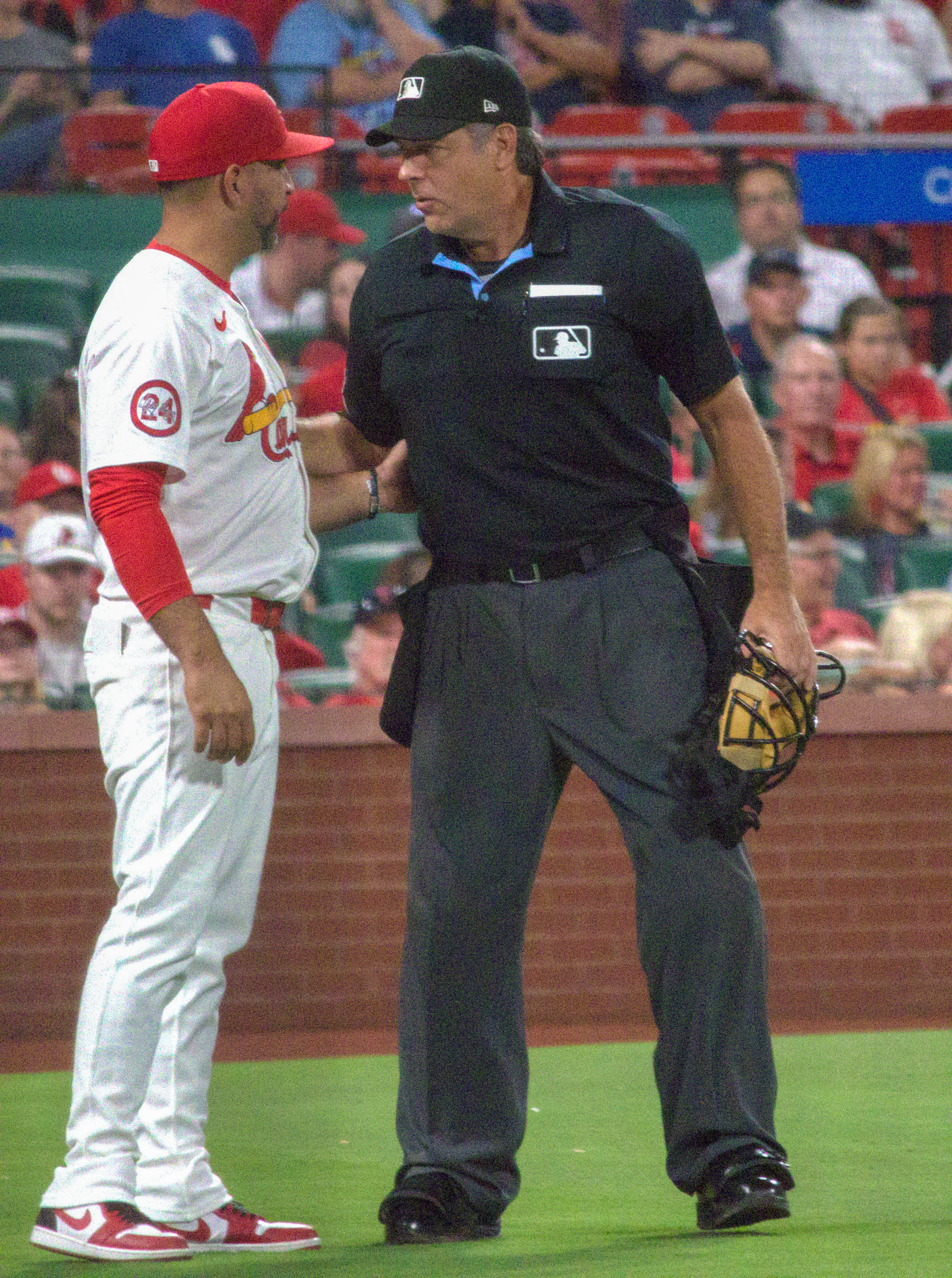
Hoye in St.Louis with Manager Marmol. 2024

Hoye has been a professional umpire since 1997. He has worked in the New York–Penn League, South Atlantic League, Florida State League, Eastern League and International League before reaching MLB. He also officiated in the 2006 World Baseball Classic.

Hoye was the first base umpire for Mark Buehrle's no-hitter against the Texas Rangers on April 18, 2007.

Hoye was the plate umpire for James Paxton’s no-hitter against the Toronto Blue Jays on May 8, 2018.

== Personal life ==
Hoye graduated from Ohio State University and lives in Florida with his wife, Sharri, and their three children. He has participated in UMPS CARE charity events.

== See also ==
- List of Major League Baseball umpires (disambiguation)
