= Will Smith (pitcher) =

American baseball player (born 1989)

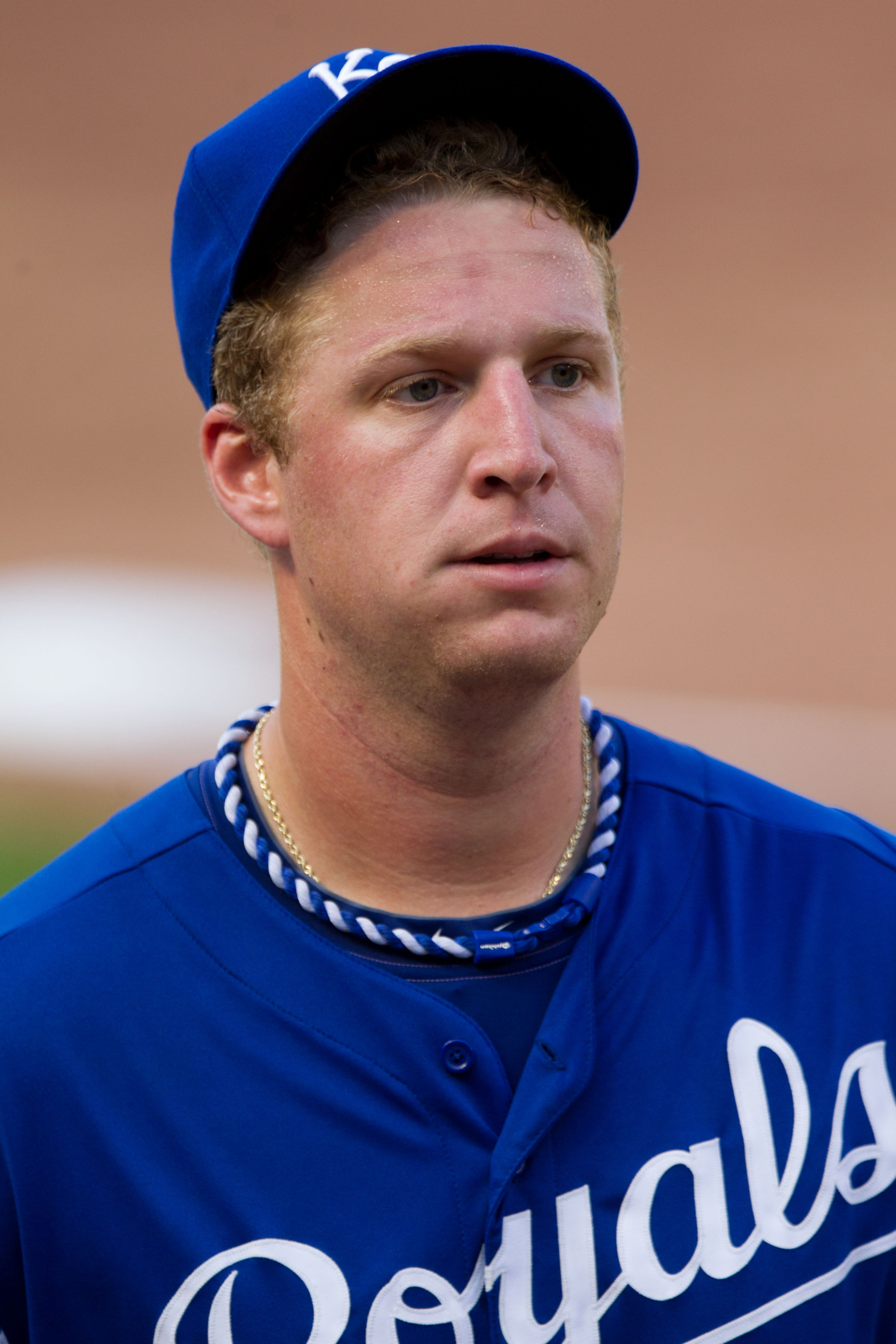
- Smith with the Kansas City Royals in 2012
- Pitcher
- Born: July 10, 1989 (age 36); Newnan, Georgia, U.S.
- Batted: Right Threw: Left

MLB debut
- May 23, 2012, for the Kansas City Royals

Last MLB appearance
- August 25, 2024, for the Kansas City Royals

MLB statistics
- Win–loss record: 33–45
- Earned run average: 3.85
- Strikeouts: 748
- Saves: 114
- Stats at Baseball Reference

Teams
- Kansas City Royals (2012–2013); Milwaukee Brewers (2014–2016); San Francisco Giants (2016, 2018–2019); Atlanta Braves (2020–2022); Houston Astros (2022); Texas Rangers (2023); Kansas City Royals (2024)

Career highlights and awards
- All-Star (2019); 3× World Series champion (2021–2023)

William Michael Smith (born July 10, 1989) is an American former professional baseball relief pitcher. He played in Major League Baseball (MLB) for the Kansas City Royals, Milwaukee Brewers, San Francisco Giants, Atlanta Braves, Houston Astros, and Texas Rangers.

Smith played college baseball at Gulf Coast Community College, and was selected by the Los Angeles Angels of Anaheim in the seventh round of the 2008 MLB draft. He made his MLB debut in 2012 as a member of Royals. In 2019, serving as the Giants' closer, Smith was an MLB All-Star.

In the 2021 postseason, Smith made 11 appearances, successfully completing each without surrendering any runs. In the 2021 World Series, he closed out Game 6 and Atlanta defeated Houston to clinch the title. Smith had a 2–0 win–loss record with six saves. He was traded to Houston in August 2022 and won his second World Series with them. Signing with Texas as a free agent for the 2023 season, Smith became the first player in the history of the four major North American sports leagues to appear in at least one game of a championship winning title run with three different teams in three consecutive seasons.

== Amateur career ==
Smith attended Northgate High School in Newnan, Georgia, where he played for the school's baseball team as a pitcher. He enrolled at Gulf Coast Community College in Panama City, Florida.

== Professional career ==
=== Draft and minor leagues ===
After his freshman year at Gulf Coast, the Los Angeles Angels of Anaheim selected Smith in the seventh round, with the 229th overall selection, of the 2008 Major League Baseball draft. Making his professional debut with the Orem Owlz of the Rookie-level Pioneer League, Smith recorded 76 strikeouts while walking only six batters. He pitched for the Cedar Rapids Kernels of the Class A Midwest League in 2009, and the Rancho Cucamonga Quakes of the Class A-Advanced California League in 2010.

On July 23, 2010, the Angels traded Smith along with Sean O'Sullivan to the Kansas City Royals for Alberto Callaspo.

Pitching for the Northwest Arkansas Naturals of the Class AA Texas League in 2011, Smith and Kelvin Herrera combined to pitch a no-hitter on July 19, with Smith pitching the first seven innings. Smith began the 2012 season with the Omaha Storm Chasers of the Class AAA Pacific Coast League.

=== Kansas City Royals (2012–2013) ===
The Royals promoted Smith to the majors for the first time on May 22, 2012. By the end of the 2012 season, Smith had made 16 starts, his record was 6–9 with a 5.32 ERA. During the 2013 season, the Royals transitioned Smith into a relief pitcher. He spent the majority of the season at Omaha. He was called up multiple times to the Royals bullpen while also making a spot start.

=== Milwaukee Brewers (2014–2016) ===
Smith was traded to the Milwaukee Brewers in exchange for Norichika Aoki on December 5, 2013. Smith had a 1–3 win–loss record and a 3.70 earned run average (ERA) in 2014. In the May 22 game against the Atlanta Braves, Smith was sent to pitch in relief of Brandon Kintzler in a botched double switch despite Smith not having warmed up in the bullpen. Smith ended up pitching with only eight warmup pitches from the mound and gave up the go-ahead run in the same inning.

On May 21, 2015, he was ejected from a game vs the Atlanta Braves for having a foreign substance on his right arm. He was suspended for eight games, pending his appeal and his suspension was subsequently reduced to six games. Smith had a 7–2 win–loss record and a 2.70 ERA in 2015.

During spring training in 2016, Smith tore the lateral collateral ligament in his knee. He returned to the Brewers on June 2. By the end of the month of July, Smith had appeared in 27 games for Milwaukee, serving as the set-up man. He had 1–3 win–loss record and a 3.68 earned run average (ERA) in those 27 appearances.

=== San Francisco Giants (2016, 2018–2019) ===
On August 1, 2016, the Brewers traded Smith to the San Francisco Giants for Phil Bickford and Andrew Susac. He made 26 appearances with the Giants, finishing with a 1–1 win–loss record and a 2.95 earned run average (ERA).

On March 20, 2017, Smith was diagnosed with possible UCL damage in his left elbow, but no structural damage. He returned to California to seek second opinions with doctors, who petitioned that Smith would require surgery. On March 24, it was reported that Smith elected to have Tommy John surgery on his elbow, ending his 2017 season with the Giants.

In 2018, he returned to action in mid-season and was used as a setup man and the closer. He appeared in 54 games, finishing with a 2–3 win–loss record and a 2.55 earned run average (ERA) to go along with 14 saves (14/18 in save opportunities).

In 2019, Smith was named the Giants' closer. He was selected to the All Star Game in 2019 after he converted 23 of 23 save opportunities in the first half of the season. For the season, he was 6–0 with 34 saves (3rd in the NL) and a 2.76 ERA, and 96 strikeouts in 65.1 innings.

=== Atlanta Braves (2020–2022) ===
On November 14, 2019, Smith signed a three-year contract with the Atlanta Braves worth $39 million, with a club option for a fourth year.

On July 4, 2020, it was announced that Smith had tested positive for COVID-19. He returned to baseball-related activities on July 26, and was placed on the Braves' active roster on August 6.

In 2020, he was 2–2 with a 4.50 ERA in 18 relief appearances covering 16 innings. On October 16, during Game 5 of the 2020 National League Championship Series (NLCS) Smith became the first MLB pitcher to face a position player of the same name in the postseason, Los Angeles Dodgers catcher Will Smith. The faceoff ended with Smith surrendering a three-run home run to the Dodgers' Smith.

In 2021, Smith was 3–7 with 37 saves and a 3.44 ERA in 71 relief appearances covering 68 innings. The Braves clinched a playoff berth, and in an NLCS rematch versus the Dodgers, he was 2–0 with no runs allowed. Smith closed out Game 6 of the World Series versus the Houston Astros, which Atlanta won to clinch the title. He notably did not surrender any runs in the entire postseason over 11 appearances, going 2–0 with six saves.

=== Houston Astros (2022) ===
The Braves traded Smith to the Houston Astros for Jake Odorizzi on August 2, 2022. Smith made his Astros debut the following day versus the Boston Red Sox, allowing a solo home run in an otherwise clean ninth inning. He appeared in 24 games for Houston but did not appear in the postseason for Houston. The Astros advanced to the World Series and defeated the Philadelphia Phillies in six games to give Smith his second World Series title in two seasons, making Smith the tenth player in Major League history to win back-to-back World Series with different teams.

The Astros declined Smith's option for 2023, thereby making him a free agent.

=== Texas Rangers (2023) ===
On March 4, 2023, Smith signed a one-year contract with the Texas Rangers. Smith led the Rangers with 22 saves during the regular season. The Rangers defeated Smith's former team, the Astros, in the 2023 ALCS to reach the 2023 World Series. This marked Smith's third straight World Series appearance with three different teams, a feat accomplished previously by Don Baylor and Eric Hinske. Smith pitched two-thirds of an inning in both Game 1 and Game 4 of the 2023 World Series. The Rangers went on to beat the Arizona Diamondbacks in the World Series in 5 games, making Smith a 3-time World Series Champion in the span of 3 years with 3 different teams, the first time this has been done in World Series history and the history of North American professional sports as a whole.

=== Kansas City Royals (second stint) ===
Seeking to address bullpen issues, the Royals reunited with Smith and signed him to a one-year $5 million contract on December 11, 2023. Smith served as a veteran leader that could lead younger arms in the bullpen and helped recruit other free agents to the Royals. Assigned as the team's closer, Smith struggled to start the season. He gave up 11 runs across 9.1 innings in April. Smith was not on the Royals' 2024 ALDS roster due to a back injury. The Royals lost in four games to the New York Yankees, ending Smith's bid for his fourth consecutive championship with his fourth different team.

== Personal life ==
Smith and his wife, Taylor, married in November 2020 in Atlanta. He often requires disambiguation from the Los Angeles Dodgers catcher Will Smith.

== See also ==
- List of Major League Baseball single-inning strikeout leaders
