= Mark Carlson (umpire) =

American baseball umpire (born 1969)

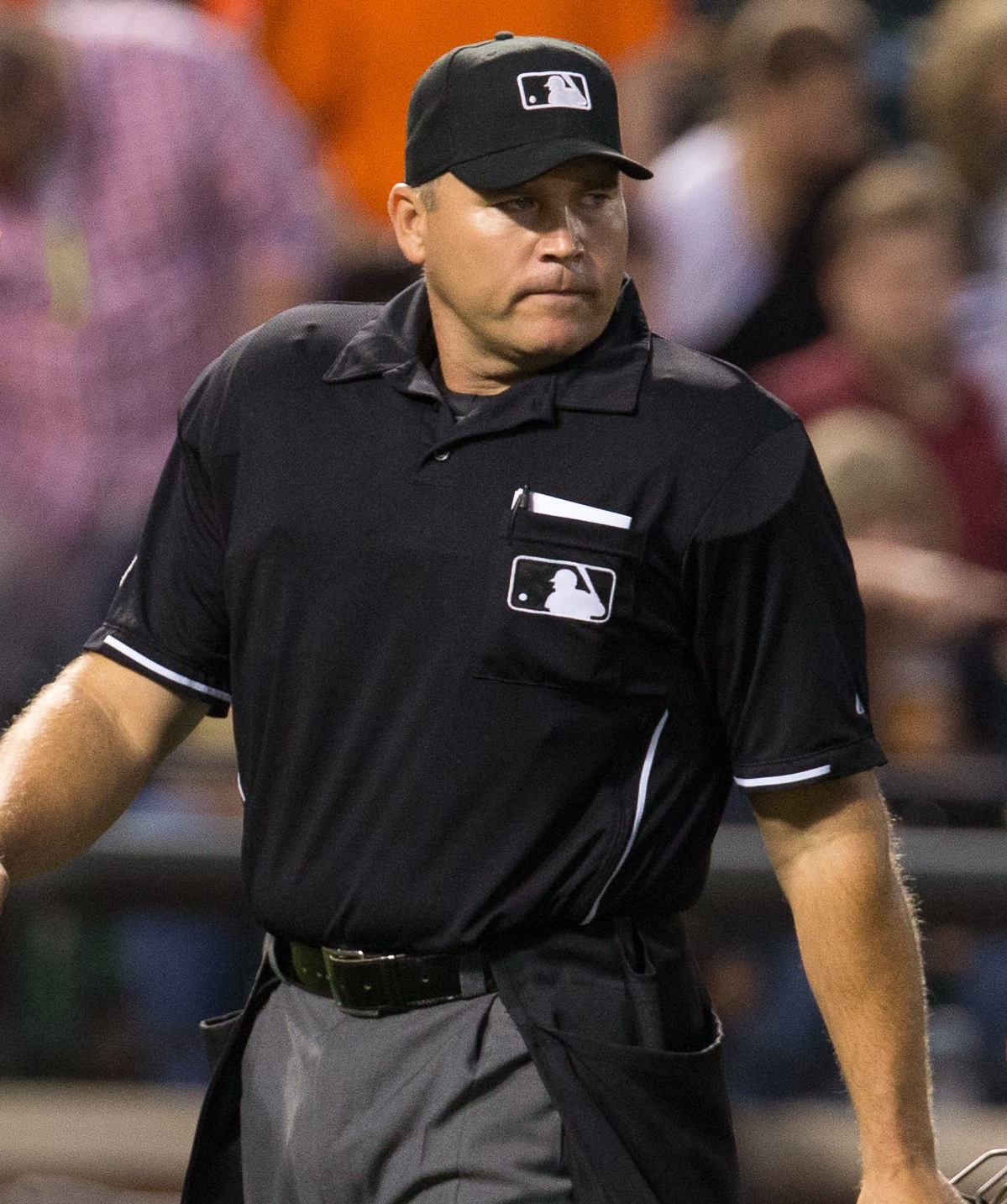
- Carlson in 2013
- Umpire
- Born: July 11, 1969 (age 57); Joliet, Illinois, U.S.

MLB debut
- June 11, 1999

Last appearance
- April 23, 2025

Career highlights and awards
- Special Assignments: All-Star Games (2003, 2017); Wild Card Games (2017, 2021); Division Series (2005, 2007, 2011, 2012, 2015, 2020, 2022, 2023, 2024); League Championship Series (2013, 2014, 2017, 2018, 2019, 2021); World Series (2015, 2020, 2024); World Baseball Classic (2023)

Mark Christopher Carlson (born July 11, 1969) is an American retired Major League Baseball umpire. He wore number 48 until the 2012 season, when his number changed to 6. He was promoted to crew chief for the 2021 season. Carlson's MLB career began in 1999, and he retired following the 2025 season.

== Umpiring career ==
Carlson began his career as a National League umpire in 1999, and has worked in both Major Leagues since 2000. Carlson had previously worked in the Pioneer, Midwest, Florida State, Southern, International, and Arizona Fall leagues before reaching MLB. Carlson has umpired the Division Series (2005, 2007, 2011, 2012, 2015, 2020, 2022, 2023, 2024), League Championship Series (2013, 2014, 2017, 2018, 2019, 2021) and World Series (2015, 2020, 2024).

Carlson was the left field umpire in the 2003 All-Star Game.

He was the home plate umpire for the May 2, 2012 no-hitter thrown by Los Angeles Angels pitcher Jered Weaver.

He was the second base umpire on September 28, 2012, when Homer Bailey of the Cincinnati Reds no-hit the Pittsburgh Pirates.

MLB selected Carlson to officiate the 2014 Opening Series from March 20–23, 2014 at the Sydney Cricket Ground in Sydney, Australia.

Carlson served as the Rules Analyst for MLB on FOX for the 2025 World Series.

== Personal life ==
Carlson was involved in baseball throughout his childhood. Carlson attended Joliet West High School and Parkland College, where he played catcher. He also served in the United States Marine Corps and served as a board member for UMPS Care Charities before founding the Mark Carlson's Care children's charity. He resides in Illinois with his wife and two daughters.

== See also ==
- List of Major League Baseball umpires (disambiguation)
