= 2021 American League Wild Card Game =

2021 Major League Baseball postseason game

	1	2	3	4	5	6	7	8	9	R	H	E
New York Yankees	0	0	0	0	0	1	0	0	1	2	6	0
Boston Red Sox	2	0	1	0	0	1	2	0	X	6	7	0
- Date: October 5, 2021
- Venue: Fenway Park
- City: Boston, Massachusetts
- Managers: Aaron Boone (New York Yankees); Alex Cora (Boston Red Sox)
- Umpires: HP: Mark Carlson; 1B: James Hoye; 2B: Jerry Meals (crew chief); 3B: Jordan Baker; LF: Ryan Blakney; RF: Jansen Visconti
- Attendance: 38,324
- Ceremonial first pitch: Jerry Remy
- Television: ESPN; ESPN2 (Statcast Edition)
- TV announcers: Matt Vasgersian, Alex Rodriguez and Buster Olney (ESPN); Jason Benetti, Eduardo Pérez and Mike Petriello (ESPN2)
- Radio: ESPN
- Radio announcers: Dave O'Brien and Xavier Scruggs

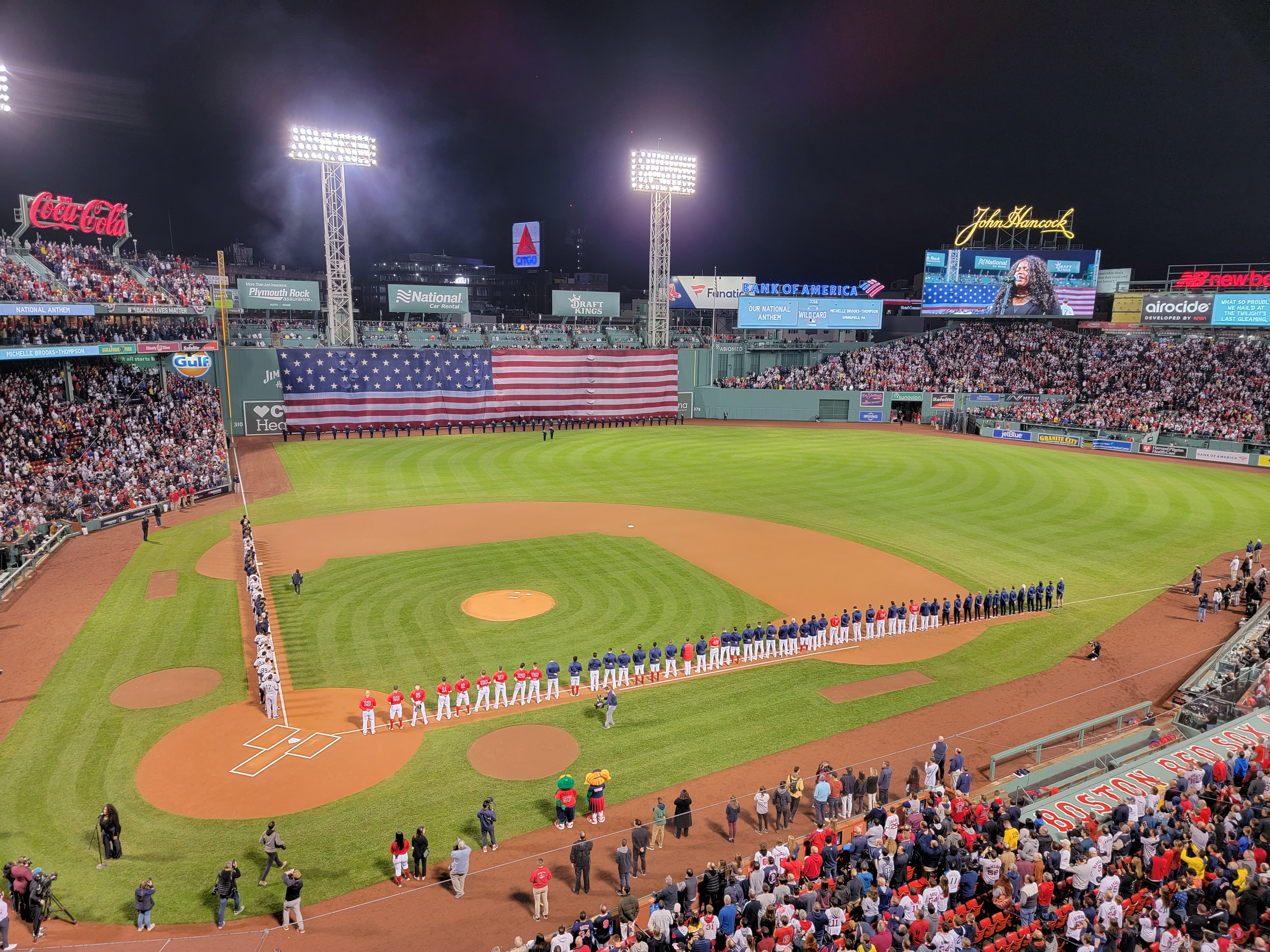
The 2021 American League Wild Card Game during the National Anthem

The 2021 American League Wild Card Game was a play-in game during the Major League Baseball (MLB) 2021 postseason, contested between the two wild card teams in the American League (AL), the New York Yankees and the Boston Red Sox. It was played on October 5 at Fenway Park in Boston, with the winner—the Boston Red Sox—advancing to the American League Division Series to face the Tampa Bay Rays, winner of the AL East.

The game was televised nationally by ESPN. An alternative telecast, featuring Statcast analytics, aired on ESPN2.

== Background ==
Entering the final day of the regular season, October 3, four teams were in contention for the two wild card berths: the Boston Red Sox (91–70), New York Yankees (91–70), Seattle Mariners (90–71) and Toronto Blue Jays (90–71). The Yankees defeated the Tampa Bay Rays, thus assuring New York of a spot in the Wild Card Game due to their 92–70 record. The Red Sox won, defeating the Washington Nationals, to finish at 92–70 and also secure a spot in the Wild Card Game. The Blue Jays defeated the Baltimore Orioles, to finish at 91–71, while the Mariners lost to the Los Angeles Angels and finished at 90–72.

With New York and Boston having identical records, the Red Sox earned home field advantage due to their 10–9 head-to-head record over the Yankees. This was the fifth postseason meeting featuring the long-time rivals. They previously met in the 1999 ALCS, 2003 ALCS, 2004 ALCS, and 2018 ALDS, with each team winning two series.

This was the Yankees' fourth Wild Card Game appearance, having lost in 2015 and having won in 2017 and 2018. This was the Red Sox’ first Wild Card Game appearance.

Boston's usual designated hitter, J. D. Martinez, was not included on Boston's roster for the game due to an ankle injury he suffered in the final game of the regular season.

== Pregame ceremonies ==
Longtime Red Sox and former second baseman Jerry Remy performed the ceremonial first pitch. It was his first public appearance after stepping away from his duties as the team's color commentator in August, due to a resurgence of lung cancer. It would ultimately be his last, as he died just over three weeks later on October 30, 2021, at the age of 68.

== Game results ==
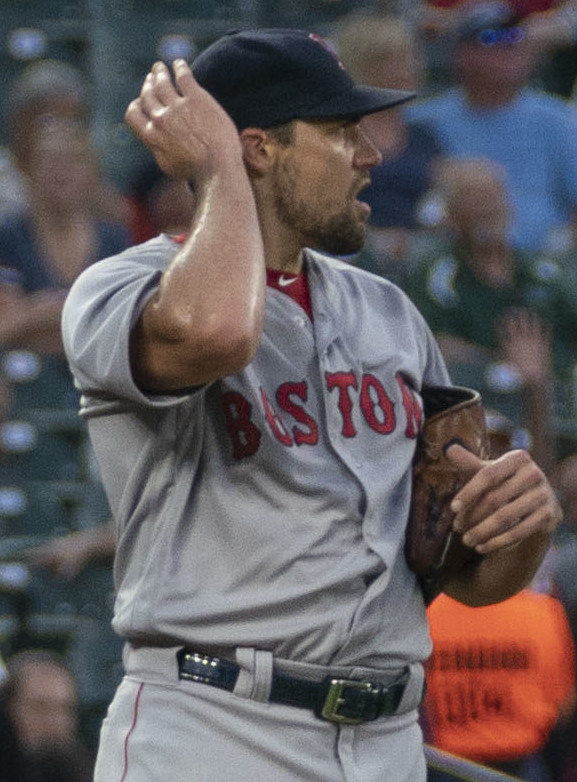
Winning pitcher Nathan Eovaldi

=== Line score ===
October 5, 2021 8:11 pm (EDT) at Fenway Park in Boston, Massachusetts 59 °F (15 °C), partly cloudy
Team	1	2	3	4	5	6	7	8	9	R	H	E
New York	0	0	0	0	0	1	0	0	1	2	6	0
Boston	2	0	1	0	0	1	2	0	X	6	7	0
WP: Nathan Eovaldi (1–0) LP: Gerrit Cole (0–1); Home runs: NYY: Anthony Rizzo (1), Giancarlo Stanton (1); BOS: Xander Bogaerts (1), Kyle Schwarber (1); Attendance: 38,324; Boxscore

Boston took an early 2–0 lead, via a two-run homer by Xander Bogaerts in the first inning. A solo home run by Kyle Schwarber in the third inning extended the lead to 3–0. Gerrit Cole left without recording an out in the third, having allowed three runs on four hits; he was replaced by Clay Holmes. A solo home run by Anthony Rizzo in the top of the sixth made it a 3–1 game. Nathan Eovaldi left with one out in the sixth; he was replaced by Ryan Brasier. A New York rally was snuffed out when Aaron Judge was thrown out at the plate attempting to score from first on a Giancarlo Stanton single off of the Green Monster. Alex Verdugo's RBI double in the bottom of the sixth put Boston ahead by three again, 4–1. Verdugo drove in another two runs in the seventh, extending Boston's lead to 6–1. Stanton homered with one out in the ninth, but the Yankees could not rally further as the Red Sox won, 6–2.

== See also ==
- 2021 National League Wild Card Game
- Red Sox–Yankees rivalry
