= 2021 National League Wild Card Game =

Major League Baseball postseason game

	1	2	3	4	5	6	7	8	9	R	H	E
St. Louis Cardinals	1	0	0	0	0	0	0	0	0	1	5	0
Los Angeles Dodgers	0	0	0	1	0	0	0	0	2	3	7	1
- Date: October 6, 2021
- Venue: Dodger Stadium
- City: Los Angeles, California
- Managers: Mike Shildt (St. Louis Cardinals); Dave Roberts (Los Angeles Dodgers)
- Umpires: HP: Joe West (crew chief); 1B: Alan Porter; 2B: Laz Díaz; 3B: Jim Wolf; LF: Chris Segal; RF: Ramon De Jesus
- Attendance: 53,193
- Television: TBS
- TV announcers: Brian Anderson, Ron Darling, and Lauren Shehadi
- Radio: ESPN
- Radio announcers: Jon Sciambi and Kyle Peterson

The 2021 National League Wild Card Game was a play-in game in Major League Baseball’s (MLB) 2021 postseason contested between the two wild card teams in the National League (NL): the St. Louis Cardinals and the Los Angeles Dodgers. It was played on October 6, at Dodger Stadium.

The game was televised nationally by TBS. Chris Taylor of the Los Angeles Dodgers hit a two out, two-run, walk-off home run in the bottom of the 9th inning to win the game for the Dodgers, sending them to the National League Division Series to face the San Francisco Giants.

== Background ==
The St. Louis Cardinals secured a postseason berth in the Wild Card Game on September 28. The Cardinals previously appeared in the 2012 NL Wild Card Game, defeating the Atlanta Braves, and the 2020 NL Wild Card Series, where they fell to the San Diego Padres, two games to one.

The San Francisco Giants clinched the National League West with the best record (107–55) on the last day of the season, thus clinching home-field advantage throughout the entire playoffs. In turn, the Los Angeles Dodgers, who set an MLB record for the most wins by a wild card team (106–56), hosted the St. Louis Cardinals (90–72) for the one game playoff. This is the Dodgers first wild card game appearance after winning the NL West for eight consecutive seasons. The 16-game difference between the teams is the largest in Wild Card Game/Series-era (2012-present).

The Cardinals won 22 of their final 25 regular-season games, which included a 17-game winning streak, the longest in franchise history. After acquiring Max Scherzer and Trea Turner at the trade deadline, the Dodgers went 44–13 the rest of the season.

This was the sixth postseason meeting between the Dodgers and Cardinals, with the Cardinals previously winning four and the Dodgers winning one. In the regular season series, the Dodgers posted a 4–3 record against the Cardinals.

The Dodgers' All-Star first baseman Max Muncy was not on the roster due to a collision at first base with Jace Peterson on the final day of the season. It was later reported he suffered a dislocated elbow on the play and his status remained an unknown if the Dodgers advanced.

== Game results ==
=== Line score ===
October 6, 2021 5:10 pm (PDT) at Dodger Stadium in Los Angeles, California 66 °F (19 °C), mostly cloudy
Team	1	2	3	4	5	6	7	8	9	R	H	E
St. Louis	1	0	0	0	0	0	0	0	0	1	5	0
Los Angeles	0	0	0	1	0	0	0	0	2	3	7	1
WP: Kenley Jansen (1–0) LP: T. J. McFarland (0–1); Home runs: STL: None; LAD: Justin Turner (1), Chris Taylor (1); Attendance: 53,193; Boxscore

Max Scherzer started for the Dodgers and he pitched 4 1/3 innings, allowing only one run on three hits and three walks. Tommy Edman scored the Cardinals run in the first inning on a bloop single, stolen base and a wild pitch. Adam Wainwright pitched 5 1/3 innings for the Cardinals, allowing only a solo home run by Justin Turner in the fourth inning. The game remained tied until the bottom of the ninth when Chris Taylor hit a walk-off two-run home run off of Alex Reyes.

This was Mike Shildt's last game as the Cardinals' manager, as well as the last game for longtime MLB umpire Joe West. Shildt was dismissed by the team on October 14, 2021, and replaced by Oliver Marmol.

== See also ==
- 2021 American League Wild Card Game
- Cardinals–Dodgers rivalry
