= Chris Taylor (baseball) =

American baseball player (born 1990)

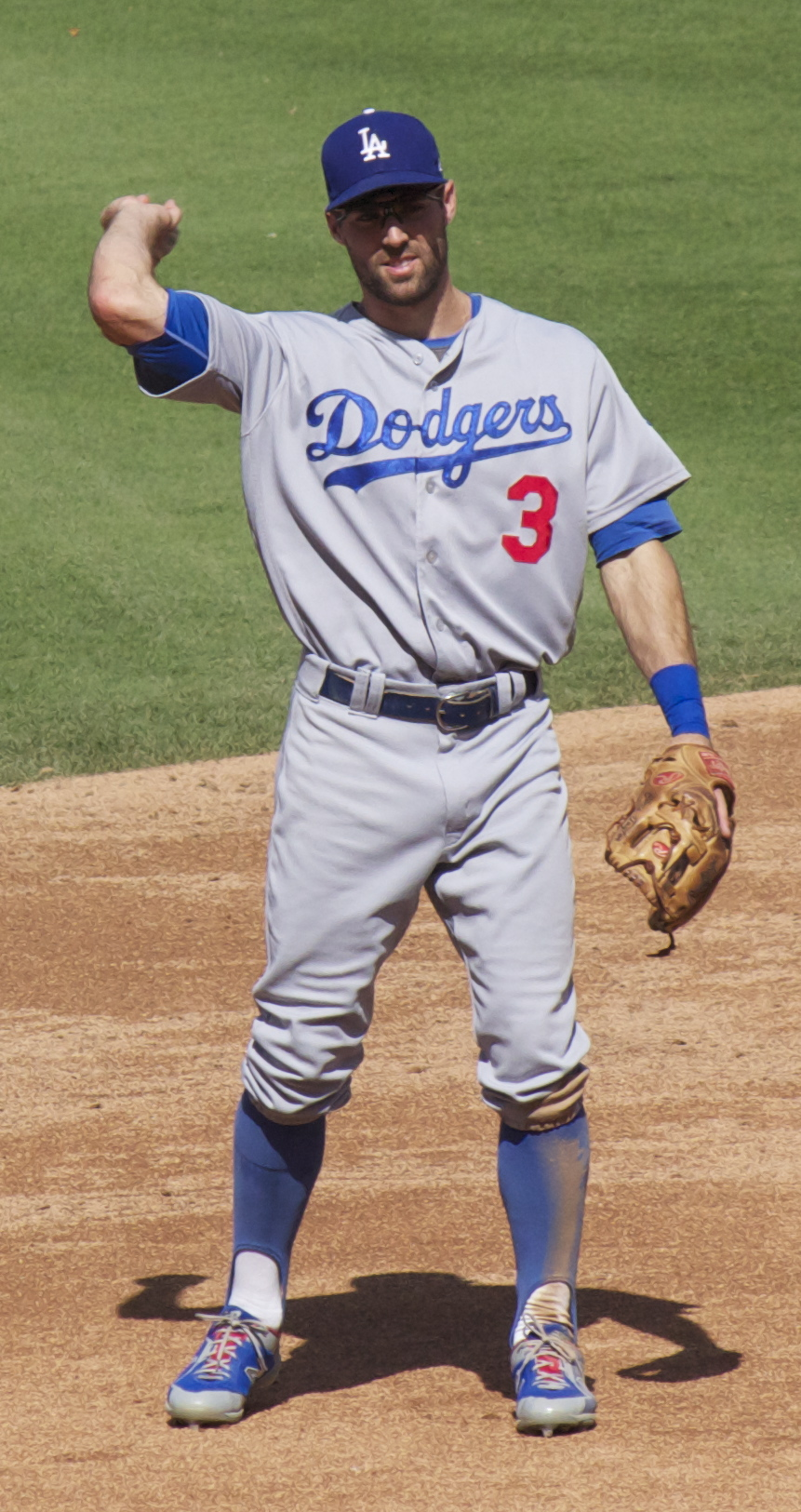
- Taylor with the Los Angeles Dodgers in 2017
- Utility player
- Born: August 29, 1990 (age 35); Virginia Beach, Virginia, U.S.
- Batted: Right Threw: Right

MLB debut
- July 24, 2014, for the Seattle Mariners

Last MLB appearance
- September 28, 2025, for the Los Angeles Angels

MLB statistics
- Batting average: .248
- Home runs: 110
- Runs batted in: 443
- Stats at Baseball Reference

Teams
- Seattle Mariners (2014–2016); Los Angeles Dodgers (2016–2025); Los Angeles Angels (2025)

Career highlights and awards
- All-Star (2021); 2× World Series champion (2020, 2024); NLCS MVP (2017)

Christopher Armand Taylor Jr. (born August 29, 1990), nicknamed "CT3", is an American former professional baseball utility player. He played in Major League Baseball (MLB) for the Seattle Mariners, Los Angeles Dodgers, and Los Angeles Angels.

Taylor played college baseball for the Virginia Cavaliers. Taylor was selected in the fifth round of the 2012 MLB draft and made his MLB debut with the Mariners in 2014. Traded to the Dodgers, Taylor won the National League Championship Series Most Valuable Player Award in 2017, was a member of the World Series champions in 2020 and 2024, and was an All-Star in 2021. During his major league career, he played every position except for catcher, first baseman and pitcher.

== Early life ==
=== Amateur career ===
Taylor attended Great Neck Middle School in Virginia Beach, Virginia, where he was on the wrestling team and won a city wrestling championship. When he attended Frank W. Cox High School in Virginia Beach, he stopped wrestling to focus on baseball. He was named the All-Tidewater region Player of the Year in 2009.

Taylor was recruited to play college baseball by the University of Virginia and the College of William & Mary. He chose to attend Virginia and played for the Cavaliers baseball team, competing in the Atlantic Coast Conference (ACC). In his freshman year, Taylor played sparingly as Tyler Cannon, an All-ACC shortstop, received most of the playing time. In the summer of 2010, Taylor played collegiate summer baseball for the Newport Gulls of the NECBL.

In his sophomore year, Stephen Bruno was named the Cavaliers' starting shortstop at the beginning of the season, and Taylor began the year as the team's right fielder. Taylor became the starting shortstop when Bruno suffered a hamstring injury and retained the job after Bruno recovered. In 2011, Taylor hit a two-out single to drive in the tying and winning runs in the decisive game of the Charlottesville Super Regional against UC Irvine to send the Cavaliers to the College World Series. That summer, he played for the Yarmouth-Dennis Red Sox in the Cape Cod Baseball League.

== Professional career ==
=== Seattle Mariners ===
==== Minor leagues ====
The Seattle Mariners selected Taylor in the fifth round, with the 161st overall selection of the 2012 Major League Baseball draft. He began his professional career in Minor League Baseball at the Rookie-level, but was soon promoted to Single-A, primarily playing shortstop. In 2013, Taylor played for the High Desert Mavericks of the High-A California League and Jackson Generals of the Double-A Southern League, finishing the season with a combined .314 batting average, 165 hits (eighth-best in Minor League Baseball), eight home runs, 60 runs batted in (RBI), 108 runs scored, and 38 stolen bases while playing shortstop and second base. After the season, the Mariners assigned Taylor to the Peoria Javelinas of the Arizona Fall League, and named him their minor league player of the year. He hit .294 with Peoria, and had a .351 on-base percentage, while playing second base and shortstop.

==== Major leagues ====
The Mariners invited Taylor to spring training in 2014. Following spring training, he was assigned to the Tacoma Rainiers of the Triple-A Pacific Coast League (PCL). He appeared in the Triple-A All-Star Game, and was named the PCL's Top Star. After batting .328 with five home runs, 37 RBI, and 63 runs scored in 75 games while playing shortstop and second base, the Mariners promoted Taylor to the major leagues on July 24 to replace the injured Willie Bloomquist. He collected his first major-league hit, a single, that night against the Baltimore Orioles' Wei-Yin Chen. In 47 games, he hit .287.

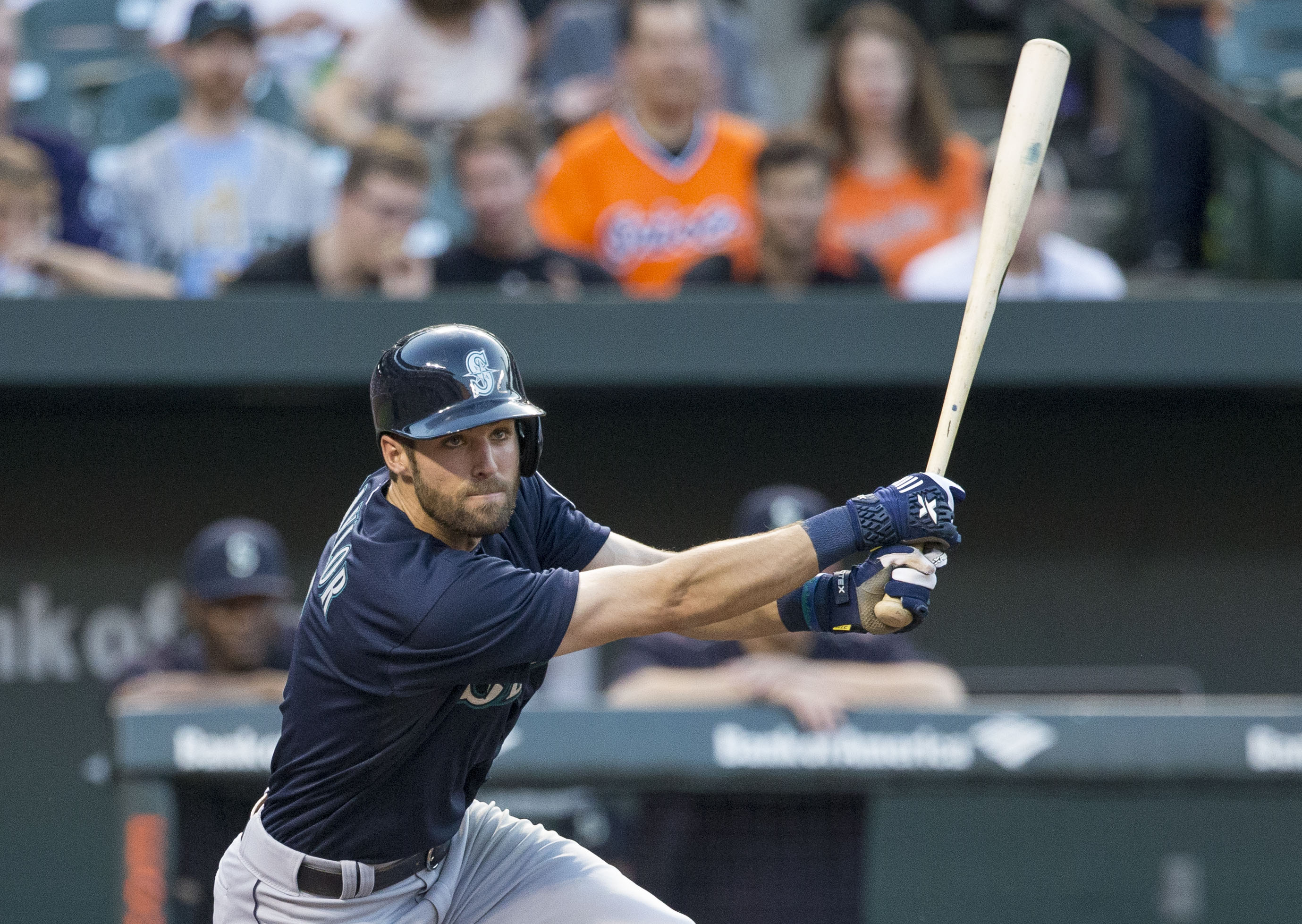
Taylor hitting with the 2015 Seattle Mariners

During spring training in 2015, Taylor fractured his wrist when he was hit by a pitch. After he recovered from his injury, he began the 2015 season with Triple-A Tacoma, where he hit .300 in 86 games. For the 2015 major league season, he batted .170 with no home runs and one RBI in 94 at bats, while playing shortstop, second base, and third base.

After beginning 2016 back in the minors, Taylor was recalled on May 21 to replace the injured Ketel Marte. He had one hit in three at-bats over two games.

=== Los Angeles Dodgers ===
On June 19, 2016, the Mariners traded Taylor to the Los Angeles Dodgers for pitcher Zach Lee. Mariners general manager Jerry Dipoto would later regret making the trade, calling it "clearly the worst deal I've ever made."

On July 15, 2016, Taylor hit his first major league career home run, a grand slam, off Silvino Bracho of the Arizona Diamondbacks. He also had a double, a triple, drove in six runs, and fell just short of hitting for the cycle. He was the third Dodgers player in history to have his first career homer be a grand slam (Preston Ward in 1948 and Chico Fernández in 1956) and the third Dodgers second baseman to have at least six RBIs in a game (Billy Herman in 1943 and Jackie Robinson in 1949). He played in 34 games for the Dodgers in 2016, hitting .207 with one home run and seven RBIs, primarily playing shortstop.

Taylor did not make the club out of spring training in 2017 and was assigned to Oklahoma City to begin the season, for whom he batted .233 with one home run and five RBIs in 43 at bats. He was recalled to the Dodgers on April 19. On July 6, against the Arizona Diamondbacks, Taylor hit his first career walk-off hit, driving in Logan Forsythe to win the game 5-4. In the 2017 regular season, he batted .288 with 21 home runs, 72 RBIs, and 142 strikeouts in 514 at bats, playing center field, left field, second base, shortstop, and third base.

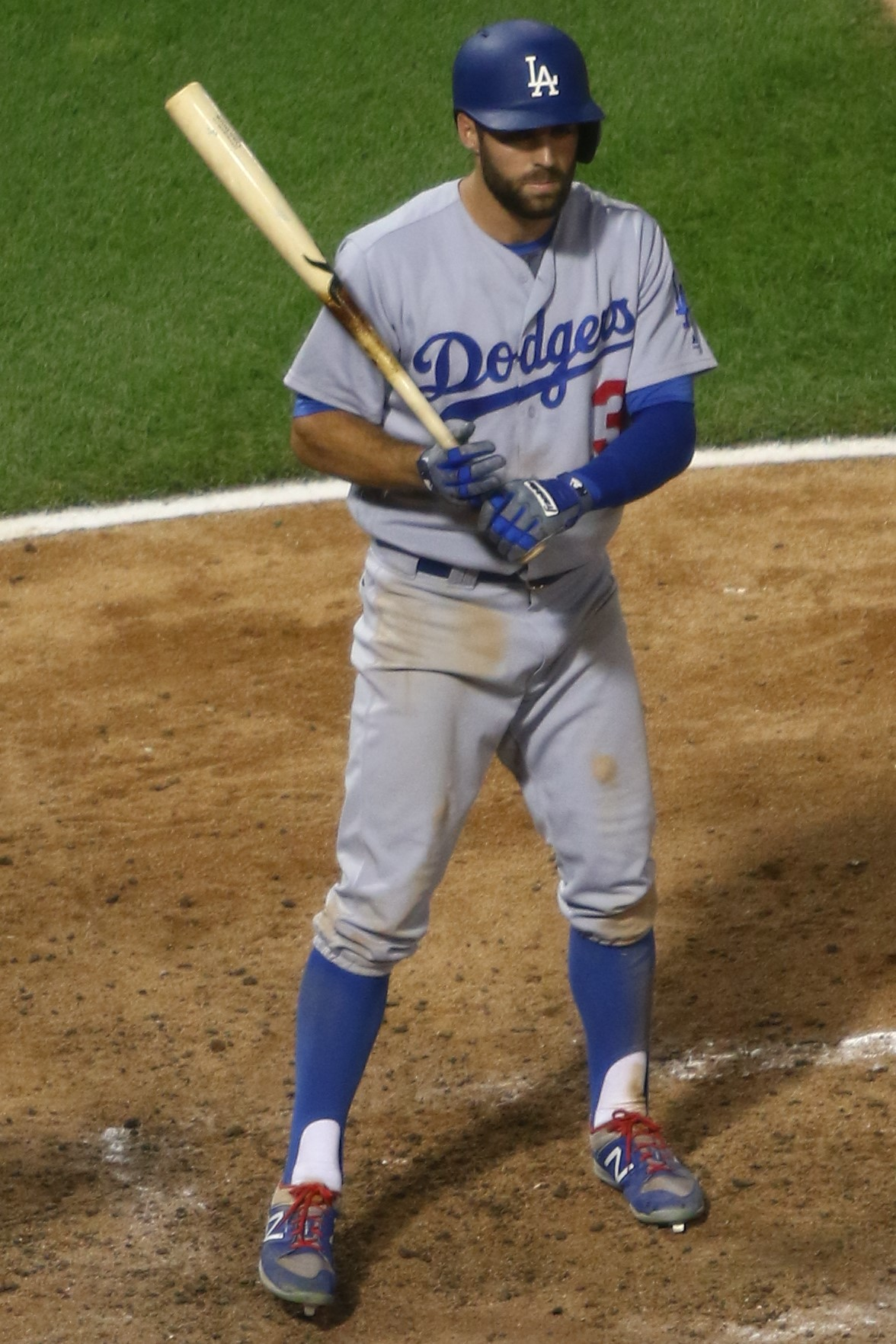
Taylor for the 2017 Dodgers

On October 14, 2017, he hit his first career postseason home run, off Héctor Rondón of the Chicago Cubs in Game 1 of the National League Championship Series (NLCS). Taylor and Justin Turner were selected as the co-MVPs of the NLCS. On October 24, Taylor hit a home run on the first pitch by Astros' pitcher Dallas Keuchel to begin Game 1 of the World Series. Overall, in the 2017 postseason, Taylor hit .254 with three home runs and seven RBI in 15 games as the Dodgers lost the World Series in seven games.

In his third season with the Dodgers in 2018, Taylor posted a .254/.331/.444 slashline with 17 home runs, 63 RBIs, and nine stolen bases in 604 plate appearances, and led the National League (NL) with 178 strikeouts. He reached career highs in games played (155), runs scored (85), doubles (35), triples (8), and walks (55). With teammate Corey Seager missing most of the season due to injury, Taylor spent the majority of the season at shortstop (81 games, 73 starts). He also played center field (50 games, 32 starts), left field (24 games, 18 starts), second base (12 games, 5 starts), and third base (8 games, 3 starts). On September 10, Taylor was selected to represent MLB in the 2018 MLB Japan All-Star Series. In the postseason, Taylor had only one hit in four at-bats in the NLDS, but his hit was a home run. In the NLCS, he had eight hits in 22 at-bats, and in the World Series, he had two hits in 18 at-bats.

In 2019, Taylor returned to his utility role, playing in 124 games (which included 39 at shortstop during another Seager injury). Taylor hit .262/.333/.462 with 12 homers and 52 RBIs, and 115 strikeouts in 366 at bats. He only recorded one hit in 11 at-bats in the NLDS. On February 7, 2020, Taylor signed a two-year, $13.4 million contract extension with the Dodgers, avoiding salary arbitration. The season was shortened due to the COVID-19 pandemic, and Taylor was the Dodgers primary second baseman, appearing in 56 of the Dodgers' 60 games, and batting .270/.366/.476 with eight homers and 32 RBIs. In the postseason, he had three hits in six at-bats in the Wild Card Series, was hitless in 8 at-bats in the NLDS, had four hits in 18 at-bats in the NLCS. In the World Series, Taylor had five hits, including a home run, in 23 at-bats. Taylor received his first championship ring, as the Dodgers defeated the Tampa Bay Rays in six games to win their first championship since 1988.

Taylor was selected to represent the Dodgers at the 2021 All-Star Game, his first All-Star appearance. During the regular season, he batted .254/.344/.438 with 20 home runs, 73 RBIs and 13 stolen bases in 148 games. On October 6, Taylor hit a two-out, two-run, walk-off home run against the St. Louis Cardinals in the NL Wild Card game. On October 21, Taylor hit three home runs in Game 5 of the NLCS against the Atlanta Braves, becoming the first player in MLB history to hit three home runs in an elimination game. On December 1, Taylor re-signed with the Dodgers with a four-year contract worth $60 million, which also included a team option for a fifth year.

In 2022, Taylor played in 118 games for the Dodgers (with the majority of them being in the outfield), and batted .221 with 10 homers and 43 RBIs though he was hitless in seven at-bats during the NLDS.

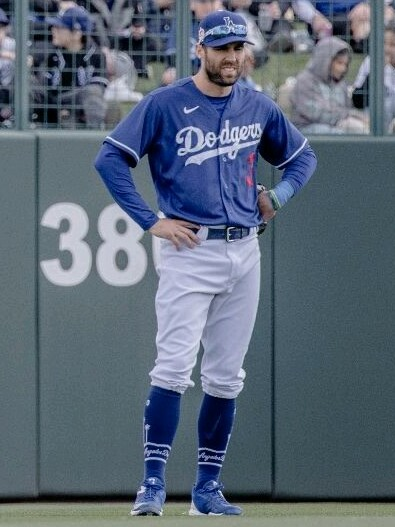
Taylor during spring training in 2023

On June 15, 2023, Taylor hit his 100th career home run, a grand slam off of Reynaldo López of the Chicago White Sox, becoming the first player in history to hit grand slams for both his first and 100th career homers. He played in 117 games, batting .237 with 15 homers and 56 RBI. In the NLDS, Taylor had one hit and one RBI in seven at-bats.

The 2024 season was difficult for Taylor, as he was hitting only .167 when he went on the injured list with a groin injury in late July. He was sidelined until August 22. He only played in 87 games in 2024, the lowest total in a 162-game season since 2016, and he hit .202, his lowest average since 2015 when he was with the Mariners. Taylor had four at-bats in the NLDS without recording a hit though he got more playing time in the NLCS due to an injury to Gavin Lux, recording three hits, two walks and one stolen base in 11 plate appearances. Taylor was used primarily as a late-game defensive replacement and pinch runner in the World Series, scoring a run in Game 1 and later hitting a single in his only at-bat as he won his second championship with Los Angeles.

Taylor was relegated to occasional appearances the first month and a half of the 2025 season, getting only 35 at-bats in 28 games, with seven hits for a .200 batting average. The Dodgers released him on May 18.

=== Los Angeles Angels ===
On May 26, 2025, Taylor signed a major league contract with the Los Angeles Angels. He suffered a broken left hand after being hit by a Tyler Ferguson pitch in a game against the Athletics on June 9. With the Angels, Taylor played in 30 games, batting .179 with two home runs and 10 RBI. Between the Dodgers and the Angels, Taylor played in 58 games in 2025, batting .186 with two home runs and 12 RBI.

Taylor re-signed with the Angels on a minor league contract on February 13, 2026. He was released on March 21, when he failed to win a roster spot during spring training. On March 27, Taylor re-signed with the Angels organization on a new minor league contract. Taylor began the regular season with the Triple-A Salt Lake Bees. On May 22, he announced his retirement from professional baseball. However, the next day, Taylor reversed the original announcement and returned to the Bees; he was subsequently placed on the injured list with a left forearm fracture. On May 24, he once again announced his retirement from professional baseball.

== Personal life ==
Taylor's father, Chris Sr., and grandfather, Armand, attended Virginia Tech, where they competed on the wrestling team.

Taylor married his wife in December 2022 in Waialua, Hawaii. Their first child was born in 2023.
