= 2013 Major League Baseball postseason =

2013 Major League Baseball playoffs

Tournament details
- Dates: October 1–30, 2013
- Teams: 10

Final positions
- Champions: Boston Red Sox (8th title)
- Runners-up: St. Louis Cardinals

Tournament statistics
- Most HRs: David Ortiz (BOS) (5)
- Most SBs: Jacoby Ellsbury (BOS) (6)
- Most Ks (as pitcher): Max Scherzer (DET) & Adam Wainwright (STL) (34)

Awards
- MVP: David Ortiz (BOS)

The 2013 Major League Baseball postseason was the playoff tournament of Major League Baseball for the 2013 season. The winners of the Division Series would move on to the League Championship Series to determine the pennant winners that face each other in the World Series.

In the American League, the Detroit Tigers made their third straight appearance, the Boston Red Sox returned for the first time since 2009, the Oakland Athletics made their second straight appearance, the Tampa Bay Rays made their fourth appearance in the past six years, and the Cleveland Indians returned for the first time since 2007.

In the National League, the St. Louis Cardinals made their third straight postseason appearance, and the Atlanta Braves and Cincinnati Reds made their second straight appearances, marking the first time since 1995 that both teams from Ohio made the postseason. The Pittsburgh Pirates ended over two decades of futility, as they clinched their first postseason berth since 1992, and the Los Angeles Dodgers made their first postseason appearance of the decade. 2013 marked the first of what is now currently fourteen straight postseason appearances for the Dodgers, who currently hold the longest active postseason streak in the majors.

The postseason began on October 1, 2013, and ended on October 30, 2013, with the Red Sox defeating the Cardinals in six games in the 2013 World Series. It was the eighth title for the Red Sox, and their third title in ten years.

== Playoff seeds ==
American League Teams National League Teams

The following teams qualified for the postseason:

=== American League ===
1. Boston Red Sox – 97–65, AL East champions
2. Oakland Athletics – 96–66, AL West champions
3. Detroit Tigers – 93–69, AL Central champions
4. Cleveland Indians – 92–70
5. Tampa Bay Rays – 92–71

=== National League ===
1. St. Louis Cardinals – 97–65, NL Central champions
2. Atlanta Braves – 96–66, NL East champions
3. Los Angeles Dodgers – 92–70, NL West champions
4. Pittsburgh Pirates – 94–68
5. Cincinnati Reds – 90–72

== Playoff bracket ==
Wild Card Game (ALWC, NLWC)
4	Cleveland	0
5	Tampa Bay	1
4	Pittsburgh	1
5	Cincinnati	0

Division Series (ALDS, NLDS)
1	Boston	3
5	Tampa Bay	1
American League
2	Oakland	2
3	Detroit	3
1	St. Louis	3
4	Pittsburgh	2
National League
2	Atlanta	1
3	LA Dodgers	3

League Championship Series (ALCS, NLCS)
1	Boston	4
3	Detroit	2
1	St. Louis	4
3	LA Dodgers	2

World Series
AL1	Boston	4
NL1	St. Louis	2

== American League Wild Card ==
=== (4) Cleveland Indians vs. (5) Tampa Bay Rays ===
October 2, 2013 8:07 pm (EDT) at Progressive Field in Cleveland, Ohio, 69 °F (21 °C), clear
Team	1	2	3	4	5	6	7	8	9	R	H	E
Tampa Bay	0	0	1	2	0	0	0	0	1	4	8	0
Cleveland	0	0	0	0	0	0	0	0	0	0	9	1
WP: Alex Cobb (1–0) LP: Danny Salazar (0–1); Home runs: TB: Delmon Young (1); CLE: None; Attendance: 43,579; Boxscore

This was the first postseason meeting between the Rays and Indians. The Rays defeated the Indians in a 4–0 shutout to return to the ALDS for the fourth time in six years. The Indians became the first team in MLB history to be eliminated from the postseason without scoring a run.

Both teams would meet again in the Wild Card Series in 2022, which was won by Cleveland in a two-game sweep. This would be followed up by meeting in the League Championship Series in 2026, which Tampa Bay won in six games.

== National League Wild Card ==
=== (4) Pittsburgh Pirates vs. (5) Cincinnati Reds ===
October 1, 2013 8:06 pm (EDT) at PNC Park in Pittsburgh, Pennsylvania, 73 °F (23 °C), clear
Team	1	2	3	4	5	6	7	8	9	R	H	E
Cincinnati	0	0	0	1	0	0	0	1	0	2	6	1
Pittsburgh	0	2	1	2	0	0	1	0	X	6	13	0
WP: Francisco Liriano (1–0) LP: Johnny Cueto (0–1); Home runs: CIN: Shin-Soo Choo (1); PIT: Marlon Byrd (1), Russell Martin 2 (2); Attendance: 40,487; Boxscore

This was the sixth postseason meeting in the history of the Pirates–Reds rivalry (1970, 1972, 1975, 1979, 1990), and their first postseason meeting outside of the NLCS. The Pirates defeated the Reds behind two home runs from Russell Martin to advance to their first-ever NLDS. It was the first postseason round win by the Pirates since the 1979 World Series and postseason win overall since 1992.

As of 2026, this is the last time the Pirates won a postseason series.

== American League Division Series ==
=== (1) Boston Red Sox vs. (5) Tampa Bay Rays ===
Boston won the series, 3–1.

Game	Date	Score	Location	Time	Attendance
1	October 4	Tampa Bay Rays – 2, Boston Red Sox – 12	Fenway Park	3:33	38,177
2	October 5	Tampa Bay Rays – 4, Boston Red Sox – 7	Fenway Park	3:14	38,705
3	October 7	Boston Red Sox – 4, Tampa Bay Rays – 5	Tropicana Field	4:19	33,675
4	October 8	Boston Red Sox – 3, Tampa Bay Rays – 1	Tropicana Field	3:49	32,807

This was the second postseason meeting in the history of the Rays–Red Sox rivalry. They last met in the ALCS in 2008, which the Rays won in seven games before falling in the World Series. The Red Sox defeated the Rays in four games to return to the ALCS for the fifth time in fourteen years.

Jon Lester pitched over seven solid innings as the Red Sox blew out the Rays in Game 1. David Ortiz’s two home runs helped carry the Red Sox to victory in Game 2 as they took a 2–0 series lead heading to St. Petersburg. Game 3 went down to the wire, where José Lobatón got the Rays on the board in the series with a walk-off solo homer in the bottom of the ninth. In Game 4, the Rays held a 1–0 lead after six innings, but the Red Sox responded with three unanswered runs to close out the series.

Both teams would meet once more in the ALDS in 2021, with the same outcome as this series.

=== (2) Oakland Athletics vs. (3) Detroit Tigers ===
Detroit won the series, 3–2.

Game	Date	Score	Location	Time	Attendance
1	October 4	Detroit Tigers – 3, Oakland Athletics – 2	O.co Coliseum	3:24	48,401
2	October 5	Detroit Tigers – 0, Oakland Athletics – 1	O.co Coliseum	3:23	48,292
3	October 7	Oakland Athletics – 6, Detroit Tigers – 3	Comerica Park	3:32	43,973
4	October 8	Oakland Athletics – 6, Detroit Tigers – 8	Comerica Park	3:25	43,958
5	October 10	Detroit Tigers – 3, Oakland Athletics – 0	O.co Coliseum	3:20	46,959

This was the fourth postseason meeting between the Athletics and Tigers (1972, 2006, 2012). The Tigers once again defeated the Athletics in five games, returning to the ALCS for the third year in a row and fourth in the last seven years.

Max Scherzer pitched seven solid innings and the Tigers’ offense got to Bartolo Colón early as they took Game 1. Game 2 remained scoreless until the bottom of the ninth when Oakland's Stephen Vogt drove in Yoenis Céspedes with a walk-off base hit single to even the series headed to Detroit. The Athletics scored six runs off 2013 AL ERA leader Aníbal Sánchez to go up 2–1 in the series, and were one win away from returning to the ALCS.

Game 4 was the most memorable contest of the series — the Athletics lead 3–0 going into the fifth, until Detroit's Jhonny Peralta tied the game with a three-run home run. Coco Crisp regained the lead for the Athletics in the top of the seventh by driving in Stephen Vogt with an RBI single. In the bottom of the inning, Austin Jackson put the Tigers in the lead for good with a broken-bat RBI single, which scored Andy Dirks. In the top of the eighth, AL Cy Young winner Max Scherzer loaded the bases, but managed to get out of the bases loaded jam by striking out the first two batters and got the last on a line out to center. The Tigers scored three more runs in the bottom of the eighth to take the lead for good, and then held off a late rally by the Athletics to force a series-deciding Game 5 in Oakland.

Justin Verlander, despite having a no-hit bid broken up in the seventh, pitched eight innings of shutout ball as the Tigers won for a third straight year in Game 5 to advance to the ALCS.

With the win, the Tigers improved their postseason record against the Athletics to 3–1 all time. This was the last playoff round won by a team from Detroit until 2024.

== National League Division Series ==
=== (1) St. Louis Cardinals vs. (4) Pittsburgh Pirates ===
St. Louis won the series, 3–2.

Game	Date	Score	Location	Time	Attendance
1	October 3	Pittsburgh Pirates – 1, St. Louis Cardinals – 9	Busch Stadium	2:57	45,693
2	October 4	Pittsburgh Pirates – 7, St. Louis Cardinals – 1	Busch Stadium	3:03	45,999
3	October 6	St. Louis Cardinals – 3, Pittsburgh Pirates – 5	PNC Park	2:58	40,489
4	October 7	St. Louis Cardinals – 2, Pittsburgh Pirates – 1	PNC Park	2:36	40,493
5	October 9	Pittsburgh Pirates – 1, St. Louis Cardinals – 6	Busch Stadium	2:40	47,231

The Cardinals defeated the Pirates in five games to advance to the NLCS for the third year in a row and seventh time in the last eleven years, all by winning an NLDS Game 5.

In St. Louis, both teams exchanged blowout wins. The Cardinals’ offense chased Pittsburgh starter A.J. Burnett from the mound as they blew out the Pirates to take Game 1. Gerrit Cole pitched six solid innings in Game 2 as the Pirates blew out the Cardinals to even the series headed to Pittsburgh. In the Pirates’ first non-Wild Card postseason home game in 21 years, they held on to win 5–3 to take the series lead as Mark Melancon and closer Jason Grilli held off a rally by the Cardinals. The Pirates were now one win away from returning to the NLCS for the first time since 1992. However, their lead would not hold. Michael Wacha out-dueled Charlie Morton in a pitchers’ duel in Game 4 as the Cardinals narrowly prevailed to force a fifth game back in St. Louis. The Cardinals would win the series in Game 5 as Adam Wainwright held the Pirates to one run scored by pitching a complete game.

As of 2026, this is the last postseason appearance outside of the Wild Card round for the Pirates.

=== (2) Atlanta Braves vs. (3) Los Angeles Dodgers ===
Los Angeles won the series, 3–1.

Game	Date	Score	Location	Time	Attendance
1	October 3	Los Angeles Dodgers – 6, Atlanta Braves – 1	Turner Field	3:24	43,021
2	October 4	Los Angeles Dodgers – 3, Atlanta Braves – 4	Turner Field	3:29	48,966
3	October 6	Atlanta Braves – 6, Los Angeles Dodgers – 13	Dodger Stadium	4:01	54,646
4	October 7	Atlanta Braves – 3, Los Angeles Dodgers – 4	Dodger Stadium	3:19	54,438

This was the second postseason meeting between the Dodgers and Braves. They previously met in the NLDS in 1996, which the Braves won in a sweep before falling in the World Series. The Dodgers defeated the Braves in four games to advance to the NLCS for the third time in five years.

Clayton Kershaw out-dueled Kris Medlen as the Dodgers stole Game 1 in Atlanta. The Braves evened the series in Game 2 as closer Craig Kimbrel held off a rally by the Dodgers. Game 2 was the last postseason game ever played at Turner Field. When the series shifted to Los Angeles, Carl Crawford and Juan Uribe both hit three-run home runs as the Dodgers blew out the Braves to regain the series lead. Juan Uribe hit a go-ahead home run in the eighth inning and closer Kenley Jansen closed out the series for Los Angeles in Game 4.

The Braves and Dodgers would meet again four more times in the postseason – twice in the NLDS in 2018 and 2026 – both won in four games by Los Angeles; and the NLCS in 2020 and 2021, with the winner of each NLCS meeting going on to win the World Series (Los Angeles in 2020, Atlanta in 2021).

== American League Championship Series ==
=== (1) Boston Red Sox vs. (3) Detroit Tigers ===
Boston won the series, 4–2.

Game	Date	Score	Location	Time	Attendance
1	October 12	Detroit Tigers – 1, Boston Red Sox – 0	Fenway Park	3:56	38,210
2	October 13	Detroit Tigers – 5, Boston Red Sox – 6	Fenway Park	3:28	38,029
3	October 15	Boston Red Sox – 1, Detroit Tigers – 0	Comerica Park	3:20 (:17 delay)	42,327
4	October 16	Boston Red Sox – 3, Detroit Tigers – 7	Comerica Park	3:27	42,765
5	October 17	Boston Red Sox – 4, Detroit Tigers – 3	Comerica Park	3:47	42,669
6	October 19	Detroit Tigers – 2, Boston Red Sox – 5	Fenway Park	3:52	38,823

The Red Sox defeated the defending American League champion Tigers in six games to return to the World Series for the first time since 2007 (in the process denying a rematch of the 2006 World Series between the Cardinals and Tigers).

In Boston, the Tigers took Game 1 in a 1–0 shutout despite having a no-hit bid broken up in the bottom of the ninth inning. In Game 2, the Tigers held a 5–1 lead after the top of the eighth inning, however, the Red Sox loaded the bases, and David Ortiz hit a grand slam to tie the game. The Red Sox won the game in the bottom of the ninth to even the series. In Detroit for Game 3, John Lackey out-dueled Justin Verlander in a pitcher’s duel as the Red Sox won 1–0 to take the series lead. In Game 4, the Tigers’ offense chased Jake Peavy from the mound as they evened the series. In Game 5, Koji Uehara stopped a rally by the Tigers to secure the victory for the Red Sox, giving them a 3–2 series lead headed back to Boston. In Game 6, the Tigers held a 2–1 lead going into the bottom of the seventh until the Red Sox again loaded the bases. Then, Shane Victorino hit a grand slam to put the Red Sox in the lead for good, securing the pennant.

The Red Sox would win their next and most recent pennant five years later over the Houston Astros in five games en route to a World Series title.

As of 2026, this remains the last postseason appearance outside of the Division Series for the Tigers.

== National League Championship Series ==
=== (1) St. Louis Cardinals vs. (3) Los Angeles Dodgers ===
St. Louis won the series, 4–2.

Game	Date	Score	Location	Time	Attendance
1	October 11	Los Angeles Dodgers – 2, St. Louis Cardinals – 3 (13)	Busch Stadium	4:47	46,691
2	October 12	Los Angeles Dodgers – 0, St. Louis Cardinals – 1	Busch Stadium	2:40	46,872
3	October 14	St. Louis Cardinals – 0, Los Angeles Dodgers – 3	Dodger Stadium	2:54	53,940
4	October 15	St. Louis Cardinals – 4, Los Angeles Dodgers – 2	Dodger Stadium	3:17	53,992
5	October 16	St. Louis Cardinals – 4, Los Angeles Dodgers – 6	Dodger Stadium	3:10	53,183
6	October 18	Los Angeles Dodgers – 0, St. Louis Cardinals – 9	Busch Stadium	2:59	46,899

This was the fourth postseason meeting in the history of the Cardinals–Dodgers rivalry and a rematch of their previous NLCS meeting in 1985, which the Cardinals won in six games before falling in the World Series. The Cardinals won in six games, advancing to the World Series for the second time in three years (in the process denying a rematch of the 1916 World Series between the Dodgers and Red Sox).

Game 1 was a long scoreless content that went into extra innings, and the Cardinals prevailed in the bottom of the thirteenth thanks to a walk-off RBI from Carlos Beltrán. Michael Wacha pitched six innings of shutout ball and the Cardinals’ bullpen stymied the Dodger offense as the Cards won 1–0 to take a 2–0 series lead headed to Los Angeles. Hyun-jin Ryu pitched seven scoreless innings as the Dodgers won in a shutout of their own to get on the board in the series. In Game 4, Shane Robinson secured a victory for the Cardinals with a solo homer in the top of the seventh as they went up 3–1 in the series. Zack Greinke pitched seven solid innings and the Dodger bullpen ended a late rally by the Cardinals as the Dodgers won Game 5 to send the series back to St. Louis. Wacha pitched seven innings of shutout ball as the Cardinals blew out the Dodgers in Game 6 to clinch the pennant. Wacha recorded a 0.00 ERA in his two starts in the series, and was named NLCS MVP as a result.

As of 2026, this is the last time the Cardinals won the NL pennant. The Cardinals would return to the NLCS the next year, but lost once again to the eventual World Series champion San Francisco Giants in five games.

The Dodgers returned to the NLCS in 2016, but lost to the eventual World Series champion Chicago Cubs in six games, who won their first league pennant in 71 years. They would eventually win the pennant again in 2017 over the aforementioned Cubs in five games before falling in the World Series.

== 2013 World Series ==
=== (AL1) Boston Red Sox vs. (NL1) St. Louis Cardinals ===
Boston won the series, 4–2.

Game	Date	Score	Location	Time	Attendance
1	October 23	St. Louis Cardinals – 1, Boston Red Sox – 8	Fenway Park	3:17	38,345
2	October 24	St. Louis Cardinals – 4, Boston Red Sox – 2	Fenway Park	3:05	38,436
3	October 26	Boston Red Sox – 4, St. Louis Cardinals – 5	Busch Stadium	3:54	47,432
4	October 27	Boston Red Sox – 4, St. Louis Cardinals – 2	Busch Stadium	3:34	47,469
5	October 28	Boston Red Sox – 3, St. Louis Cardinals – 1	Busch Stadium	2:52	47,436
6	October 30	St. Louis Cardinals – 1, Boston Red Sox – 6	Fenway Park	3:13	38,447

This was the fourth World Series meeting between the Cardinals and Red Sox. It was also the tenth meeting between teams from Boston and St. Louis for a major professional sports championship, which previously happened in three World Series (1946, 1967, 2004), four NBA Finals (1957, 1958, 1960, 1961), Super Bowl XXXVI in 2002, and the 1970 Stanley Cup Final. It was also the first World Series since 1999 to feature both #1 seeds from the AL and NL. The Red Sox defeated the Cardinals in six games to win their eighth World Series title in franchise history. It marked the first time that the Red Sox had won the World Series at home since 1918, the year when the Curse of the Bambino originally started.

Jon Lester pitched seven innings of shutout ball as the Red Sox blew out the Cardinals in Game 1. In Game 2, the Red Sox lead 2–1 after the sixth, but the Cardinals rallied with three unanswered runs to even the series headed to St. Louis. The Cardinals’ Game 2 victory ended a nine-game win streak in World Series play for the Red Sox dating back to Game 1 of the 2004 World Series, which was, ironically, a Red Sox victory over the Cardinals. In Game 3, the Cardinals prevailed in the bottom of the ninth as Allen Craig beat the throw by Red Sox third baseman Will Middlebrooks due to an obstruction call against Boston. In Game 4, the Red Sox evened the series off a three-run home run by Jonny Gomes in the top of the sixth. Lester earned his second victory of the series in Game 5, as he went seven strong innings and closer Koji Uehara shut the door on the Cardinals as the Red Sox went up 3–2 in the series headed back to Boston. John Lackey pitched six shutout innings and the Red Sox bullpen limited the Cardinals to one run as the Red Sox won 6–1 to clinch the World Series at home for the first time since 1918.

The Red Sox would return to the World Series in 2018, defeating the Los Angeles Dodgers in five games. The 2013 Red Sox were the last team to win the World Series at home until the Houston Astros did so in 2022.

With the win by Boston, the World Series history between these two teams is tied at two series wins each. As of 2026, this is the last World Series appearance by the Cardinals.

== Broadcasting ==
This was the sixth and final postseason under the U.S. rights agreement with Fox and TBS. TBS aired the two Wild Card games and most of the Division Series games, with sister network TNT used as an overflow channel. In exchange for the Wild Card games on TBS, two of the Division Series games instead aired on MLB Network. TBS also had the National League Championship Series. Fox televised the American League Championship Series and the World Series.

Under the new deals that went to effect the following season, the bulk of Fox's playoff games moved to sister network Fox Sports 1.
