= 2013 National League Championship Series =

Team (Wins)	Managers	Season
St. Louis Cardinals (4)	Mike Matheny	97–65 (.599), GA: 3
Los Angeles Dodgers (2)	Don Mattingly	92–70 (.568), GA: 11
- Dates: October 11–18
- MVP: Michael Wacha (St. Louis)
- Umpires: Gerry Davis (crew chief), Mark Carlson, Mike Everitt, Bruce Dreckman, Ted Barrett, Greg Gibson

Broadcast
- Television: TBS; MLB International
- TV announcers: Ernie Johnson, Ron Darling, Cal Ripken Jr., and Craig Sager (TBS); Gary Thorne and Rick Sutcliffe (MLB International)
- Radio: ESPN
- Radio announcers: Dan Shulman and Orel Hershiser
- NLDS: St. Louis Cardinals over Pittsburgh Pirates (3–2); Los Angeles Dodgers over Atlanta Braves (3–1)

The 2013 National League Championship Series, the 44th NLCS, was a best-of-seven playoff in Major League Baseball’s 2013 postseason pitting the top-seeded St. Louis Cardinals against the third-seeded Los Angeles Dodgers for Major League Baseball's National League pennant. The Cardinals beat the Dodgers in six games.

This was the fourth postseason meeting in the history of the Cardinals–Dodgers rivalry, after the 1985 NLCS (Cardinals won 4–2), 2004 NLDS (Cardinals won 3–1), and 2009 NLDS (Dodgers won 3–0).

The Cardinals would go on to lose to the Boston Red Sox in the 2013 World Series in six games.

As of 2026, this is the last time the Cardinals won the NL pennant.

== Matchup ==
=== St. Louis Cardinals vs. Los Angeles Dodgers ===
St. Louis won the series, 4–2.

Game	Date	Score	Location	Time	Attendance
1	October 11	Los Angeles Dodgers – 2, St. Louis Cardinals – 3 (13)	Busch Stadium	4:47	46,691
2	October 12	Los Angeles Dodgers – 0, St. Louis Cardinals – 1	Busch Stadium	2:40	46,872
3	October 14	St. Louis Cardinals – 0, Los Angeles Dodgers – 3	Dodger Stadium	2:54	53,940
4	October 15	St. Louis Cardinals – 4, Los Angeles Dodgers – 2	Dodger Stadium	3:17	53,992
5	October 16	St. Louis Cardinals – 4, Los Angeles Dodgers – 6	Dodger Stadium	3:10	53,183
6	October 18	Los Angeles Dodgers – 0, St. Louis Cardinals – 9	Busch Stadium	2:59	46,899

== Game summaries ==
=== Game 1 ===
October 11, 2013 7:37 pm (CDT) at Busch Stadium in St. Louis, Missouri 71 °F (22 °C), clear
Team	1	2	3	4	5	6	7	8	9	10	11	12	13	R	H	E
Los Angeles	0	0	2	0	0	0	0	0	0	0	0	0	0	2	9	0
St. Louis	0	0	2	0	0	0	0	0	0	0	0	0	1	3	7	0
WP: Lance Lynn (1–0) LP: Chris Withrow (0–1); Attendance: 46,691; Boxscore

Things got off to a rough start for Los Angeles when Hanley Ramirez was hit in the ribs by a 95-mph Joe Kelly fastball, which impacted his ability for the remainder of the series. The Dodgers loaded the bases with two outs off of Joe Kelly on a double and two walks in the third inning when Juan Uribe's single scored two, but in the bottom of the inning, Zack Greinke allowed a two-out single to Kelly and walked Matt Carpenter before both men scored on Carlos Beltrán's double tying the game. Greinke allowed only two runs in eight innings, while striking out a season high ten batters, the first pitcher to strike out ten Cardinals in a post-season game since Denny Galehouse in the 1944 World Series. The game went into extra innings and in the top of the tenth, Mark Ellis tripled with one out and tried to score on Michael Young's sacrifice fly, but was thrown out by Beltran to end the inning. In the bottom of the 13th, Beltran drove in the winning run with a line drive into the right-field corner that scored Daniel Descalso from second off of Kenley Jansen. The game was the third longest NLCS game ever (after game six in 1986 and game five in 1999), the Dodgers' longest post-season game since game two of the 1916 World Series and the Cardinals' longest ever. It was the longest NLCS Game 1 ever.

=== Game 2 ===
October 12, 2013 3:07 pm (CDT) at Busch Stadium in St. Louis, Missouri 73 °F (23 °C), mostly sunny
Team	1	2	3	4	5	6	7	8	9	R	H	E
Los Angeles	0	0	0	0	0	0	0	0	0	0	5	0
St. Louis	0	0	0	0	1	0	0	0	X	1	2	1
WP: Michael Wacha (1–0) LP: Clayton Kershaw (0–1) Sv: Trevor Rosenthal (1); Attendance: 46,872; Boxscore

The Dodgers' offense was short-handed in game two because Hanley Ramírez sat out with injured ribs, the result of getting hit with a pitch in game one, and with Andre Ethier getting a day off for playing the entirety of Game 1's 13-inning affair. The game was a pitchers' duel as the Cardinals only got two hits off of Clayton Kershaw and two relievers. Jon Jay's sacrifice fly scored David Freese (after he doubled to lead off the inning) for the game's only run, in the bottom of the fifth. Due to a passed ball, Freese's run was unearned. The Dodgers managed five hits off Michael Wacha but were unable to get any runs. They loaded the bases in the sixth inning with one out, but Wacha struck out Yasiel Puig and Juan Uribe to end the threat. Trevor Rosenthal struck out the side (Puig, Uribe, and pinch hitter Ethier) in the ninth inning for the save and the Dodgers fell behind 2–0 in the series. Kershaw was the first starting pitcher in postseason history to allow no earned runs and two or fewer hits and lose the game.

=== Game 3 ===
October 14, 2013 5:07 pm (PDT) at Dodger Stadium in Los Angeles, California 79 °F (26 °C), sunny
Team	1	2	3	4	5	6	7	8	9	R	H	E
St. Louis	0	0	0	0	0	0	0	0	0	0	4	0
Los Angeles	0	0	0	2	0	0	0	1	X	3	9	0
WP: Hyun-Jin Ryu (1–0) LP: Adam Wainwright (0–1) Sv: Kenley Jansen (1); Attendance: 53,940; Boxscore

In Game 3, Hyun-jin Ryu pitched seven shutout innings and the Dodgers managed to score off Adam Wainwright to take the game 3–0. In the fourth, Mark Ellis hit a leadoff double, then scored on Adrián González's double one out later. González then scored on Yasiel Puig's triple, his first hit of the series, after 11 hitless at-bats. Hanley Ramírez had two hits and an RBI single in the seventh in his return to the Dodgers lineup, despite a fractured rib. It was the first postseason series since the 1948 World Series in which neither team hit a home run in the first three games.

=== Game 4 ===
October 15, 2013 5:07 pm (PDT) at Dodger Stadium in Los Angeles, California 79 °F (26 °C), sunny
Team	1	2	3	4	5	6	7	8	9	R	H	E
St. Louis	0	0	3	0	0	0	1	0	0	4	6	0
Los Angeles	0	0	0	2	0	0	0	0	0	2	8	1
WP: Lance Lynn (2–0) LP: Ricky Nolasco (0–1) Sv: Trevor Rosenthal (2); Home runs: STL: Matt Holliday (1), Shane Robinson (1); LAD: None; Attendance: 53,992; Boxscore

Ramirez was still hobbled by the rib injury and struggled at the plate and in the field before leaving the game in the sixth inning. In the third, Daniel Descalso hit a leadoff single, moved to second on a sacrifice bunt, then scored on Matt Carpenter's double. One out later, Matt Holliday's home run, the first of the series, put the Cardinals up 3−0. The Dodgers cut the lead to 3–2 on RBI singles by Yasiel Puig and A.J. Ellis off of Lance Lynn, but Shane Robinson's home run in the seventh off of J.P. Howell padded the Cardinals' lead to 4−2 as they took a commanding 3–1 series lead.

=== Game 5 ===
October 16, 2013 1:07 pm (PDT) at Dodger Stadium in Los Angeles, California 82 °F (28 °C), sunny
Team	1	2	3	4	5	6	7	8	9	R	H	E
St. Louis	0	0	2	0	0	0	0	0	2	4	10	0
Los Angeles	0	2	1	0	1	0	1	1	X	6	9	0
WP: Zack Greinke (1–0) LP: Joe Kelly (0–1); Home runs: STL: None; LAD: Carl Crawford (1), A.J. Ellis (1), Adrián González 2 (2); Attendance: 53,183; Boxscore

The Dodgers staved off elimination in Game 5 as Zack Greinke pitched seven strong innings and the bats came alive. In the second, the Dodgers hit four singles off of Joe Kelly, the last two of which by Juan Uribe and Greinke scored a run each. The Cardinals tied the game in the third when Matt Carpenter singled, then scored on Carlos Beltrán's triple before Beltran scored on Matt Holliday's double. Adrián González's home run in the bottom of the inning put the Dodgers up 3−2. They added to their lead on home runs by Carl Crawford in the fifth, A. J. Ellis in the seventh off of Edward Mujica and González in the eighth off of John Axford. The four homers tied a Dodger post-season record that had previously been accomplished in Game 2 of the 1977 World Series and Game 1 of the 1978 NLCS. The Cardinals managed two runs off Kenley Jansen in the ninth on RBI singles by Matt Adams and Pete Kozma, but the Dodgers held on to win 6–4 and send the series back to St. Louis.

=== Game 6 ===
October 18, 2013 7:37 pm (CDT) at Busch Stadium in St. Louis, Missouri 55 °F (13 °C), cloudy
Team	1	2	3	4	5	6	7	8	9	R	H	E
Los Angeles	0	0	0	0	0	0	0	0	0	0	2	2
St. Louis	0	0	4	0	5	0	0	0	X	9	13	0
WP: Michael Wacha (2–0) LP: Clayton Kershaw (0–2); Attendance: 46,899; Boxscore

Hoping to force a game seven, the Dodgers sent their ace Clayton Kershaw to the mound to face the St. Louis Cardinals rookie Michael Wacha in a rematch of Game two's matchup. This time, Kershaw had his worst outing of the season, as he struggled through the third inning with 48 total pitches and surrendered a total of seven earned runs, ten hits, and two walks in four innings of work. Dodgers phenom Yasiel Puig committed two costly throwing errors that epitomized the frustration of that night. By contrast, Michael Wacha, backed up by solid defense and timely hits, stymied the Dodgers' offense, going seven innings and allowing just two hits and no runs.

The Cardinals scored in the third inning when Matt Carpenter lined a double into right field after an 11-pitch battle with Kershaw. Carlos Beltrán scored Carpenter from second with a line drive single, again to right field, and advanced to second. Kershaw struck out Matt Holliday but yielded another single to Yadier Molina, which scored Beltran from second to make it 2–0 Cardinals. David Freese singled to center field to move Molina to second and Kershaw, already having an uncharacteristic night, walked Matt Adams to load the bases for Shane Robinson. Robinson drove in two runs with a single to right Puig, extending the Cardinals' lead to 4–0. Puig committed a throwing error by tossing the ball on a misstep and slinging it all the way to backstop over the head of catcher A.J. Ellis. Kershaw ended the inning by intentionally walking Pete Kozma and striking out Wacha.

The Cardinals added five runs in the fifth inning. Molina singled to right field and reached second base on Puig's second throwing error of the night. David Freese singled to advance Molina to third base and Adams drove him home with a double in to make it 5–0 Cardinals. Kershaw left the game with runners on second and third after throwing 98 pitches and was replaced by reliever Ronald Belisario. Shane Robinson came up to the plate and reached second base on a choice out by shortstop Hanley Ramírez to catcher A.J. Ellis, who tagged out David Freese in a rundown between third and home. With runners still on second and third, Kozma was intentionally walked for the second time that night. Then Wacha hit Belisario's pitch and reached first base on a fielder's choice by second baseman Mark Ellis, who allowed Matt Adams to score after hesitating on a throw to home, making the score 6–0 Cardinals. Belisario was replaced by relief pitcher J.P. Howell, who allowed Robinson and Kozma to score on a sacrifice fly by Carpenter and a wild pitch to Molina respectively, stretching the lead to 8–0. Carlos Beltran closed the door on the Dodgers' postseason by singling to left field and scoring Wacha for the final run of the game, giving the Cardinals a commanding 9–0 lead. The Dodgers had one more hit, a double by catcher A.J. Ellis. The Cardinals pitching staff retired the next 12 batters to end the game.

Winning pitcher Michael Wacha was named the NLCS MVP after winning both of his starts with a 0.00 ERA, holding the Dodgers to a .149 batting average against (BAA), two walks and 13 SO in 13 2/3 scoreless IP. He became the fourth rookie to win a postseason series MVP award, following Larry Sherry (1959 World Series), Mike Boddicker (1983 NLCS), and Liván Hernández (1997 NLCS and 1997 World Series).

The victory earned the Cardinals their 19th pennant as a franchise and their second World Series appearance in three years.

=== Composite line score ===
2013 NLCS (4–2): St. Louis Cardinals over Los Angeles Dodgers

Team	1	2	3	4	5	6	7	8	9	10	11	12	13	R	H	E
Los Angeles Dodgers	0	2	3	4	1	0	1	2	0	0	0	0	0	13	40	3
St. Louis Cardinals	0	0	11	0	6	0	1	0	2	0	0	0	1	21	42	1
Total attendance: 301,577 Average attendance: 50,263

== Aftermath ==
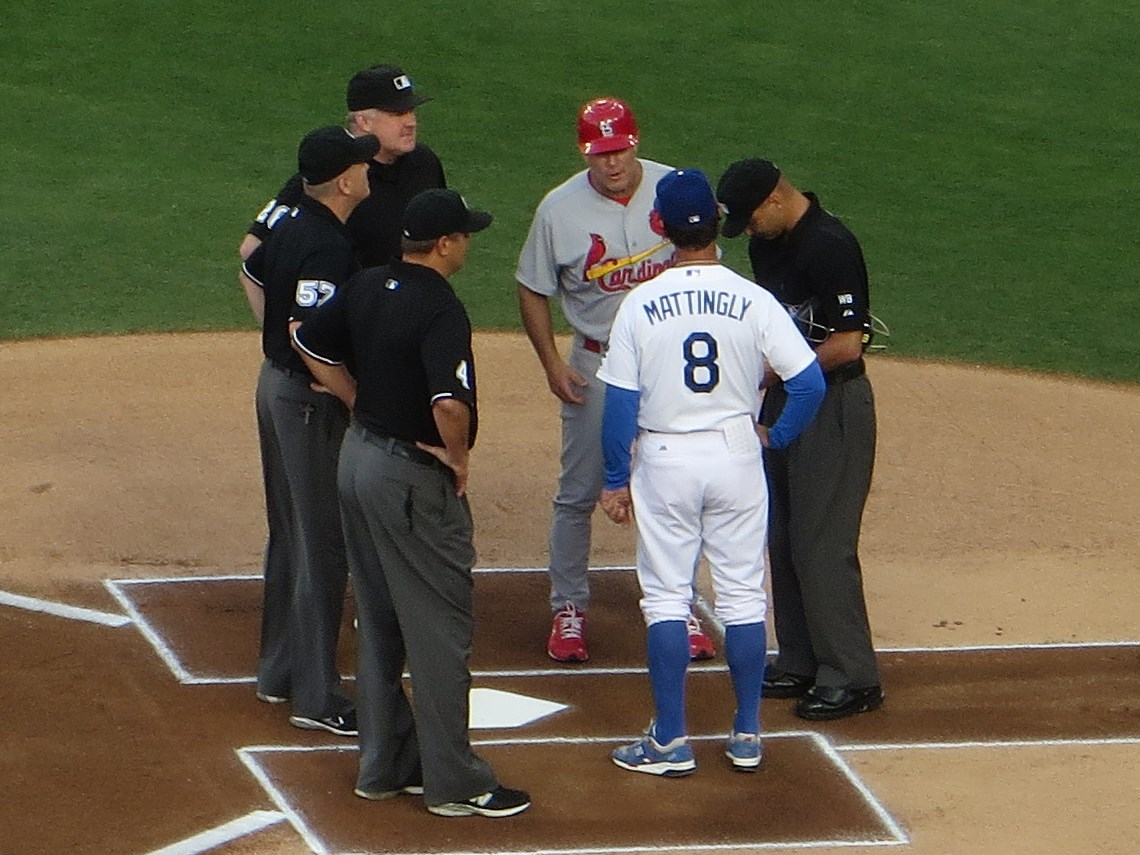
Managers Don Mattingly and Mike Mattheny before a game at Dodger Stadium in June the following season.

Days after their NLCS defeat, Dodgers general manager Ned Colletti and manager Don Mattingly held a joint press conference, in which Mattingly's job status was discussed. The press conference proved to be awkward and disjointed, as both Colletti and Mattingly seemed at odds Mattingly's contract status. After the season, Mattingly called out Dodger management for its perceived lack of support of him during the season and said that he wanted a multiyear contract in place to return in 2014. In 2013, when the Dodgers stumbled to start the season, falling to last place in the NL West while injuries piled up, speculation was rampant that Mattingly would be fired. Team President Stan Kasten indicated to him at the time that things needed to improve for Mattingly to keep his job. The team responded, winning 42 of 50 games during a torrid midseason stretch to take over first place and eventually won the division by 11 games over Arizona. Ironically, it was Colletti who was removed from his position first when the team brought in Tampa Bay's general manager Andrew Friedman to oversee Baseball Operations after the 2014 season. Colletti took the demotion and stayed with the team until taking a scouting job with the NHL's San Jose Sharks in September 2019. Mattingly did end up receiving a three-year extension before the start of the 2014 season, but he never completed the contract, as the team and Mattingly mutually parted after the 2015 postseason and was replaced by Dave Roberts. After leaving LA, Mattingly managed the Miami Marlins from 2016 to 2022.

The Cardinals and Dodgers met again during the 2014 National League Division Series with the Cardinals winning again and getting the better of 2013–2014 Cy Young Award and 2014 Most Valuable Player winner Clayton Kershaw. Between the 2013 National League Championship Series and the 2014 National League Division Series, the Cardinals beat Kershaw in all four of his starts.

Hanley Ramirez and Joe Kelly would eventually become teammates in Boston after Ramirez signed a free agent contract with the Red Sox during the 2014–2015 off-season (Kelly had been traded to Boston at the previous season's trade deadline). The 95-mph pitch from Kelly in the first inning of game one fractured Ramirez's rib and put the Dodgers at a handicap with the best hitter neutralized. Kelly eventually became a Dodger in 2019 and even became a fan favorite, winning a World Series with them in 2020 and 2024. David Freese and Mark Ellis would both later play for the NLCS-opposition, with Freese reaching another World Series with the Dodgers in 2018.

The two teams met again in the postseason in the 2021 National League Wild Card Game, with the Dodgers winning in the ninth on a two-run Chris Taylor walk-off home run.
