= 2009 Major League Baseball postseason =

2009 Major League Baseball playoffs

Tournament details
- Dates: October 7 – November 4, 2009
- Teams: 8

Final positions
- Champions: New York Yankees (27th title)
- Runners-up: Philadelphia Phillies

Tournament statistics
- Most HRs: Jayson Werth (PHI) (7)
- Most SBs: Four tied (3)
- Most Ks (as pitcher): Cliff Lee (PHI) (33)

Awards
- MVP: Hideki Matsui (NYY)

The 2009 Major League Baseball postseason was the playoff tournament of Major League Baseball for the 2009 season. The winners of the Division Series would move on to the League Championship Series to determine the pennant winners that face each other in the World Series.

In the American League, the New York Yankees returned to the postseason for the fourteenth time in the past fifteen years, the Boston Red Sox made their sixth appearance in the last seven years, the Los Angeles Angels of Anaheim returned for the sixth time in the past eight years, and the Minnesota Twins returned for the fifth time in the past nine years due to winning a tiebreaker game for the division title against the Detroit Tigers in the last game of the regular season.

In the National League, the Los Angeles Dodgers returned for the fourth time in the past six years, the Philadelphia Phillies returned for the third straight year, the Colorado Rockies returned for the second time in three years, and the St. Louis Cardinals returned for the seventh time in the past ten years.

The postseason began on October 7, 2009, and ended on November 4, 2009, with the Yankees defeating the defending World Series champion Phillies in the 2009 World Series. It was the Yankees' 27th title in franchise history, their most recent championship, as well as the most recent World Series win by a team from New York City.

== Teams ==
American League Teams National League Teams

The following teams qualified for the postseason:

=== American League ===
1. New York Yankees – 103–59, AL East champions
2. Los Angeles Angels of Anaheim – 97–65, AL West champions
3. Minnesota Twins – 87–76, AL Central champions (on tiebreaker)
4. Boston Red Sox – 95–67

=== National League ===
1. Los Angeles Dodgers – 95–67, NL West champions
2. Philadelphia Phillies – 93–69, NL East champions
3. St. Louis Cardinals – 91–71, NL Central champions
4. Colorado Rockies – 92–70

== Playoff bracket ==
Division Series (ALDS, NLDS)
1	NY Yankees	3
3	Minnesota	0
American League
2	LA Angels	3
4	Boston	0
1	LA Dodgers	3
3	St. Louis	0
National League
2	Philadelphia	3
4	Colorado	1

League Championship Series (ALCS, NLCS)
1	NY Yankees	4
2	LA Angels	2
1	LA Dodgers	1
2	Philadelphia	4

World Series
AL1	NY Yankees	4
NL2	Philadelphia	2

Note: Two teams in the same division could not meet in the division series.

== American League Division Series ==
=== (1) New York Yankees vs. (3) Minnesota Twins ===
New York won the series, 3–0.

Game	Date	Score	Location	Time	Attendance
1	October 7	Minnesota Twins – 2, New York Yankees – 7	Yankee Stadium	3:38	49,464
2	October 9	Minnesota Twins – 3, New York Yankees – 4 (11)	Yankee Stadium	4:22	50,006
3	October 11	New York Yankees – 4, Minnesota Twins – 1	Hubert H. Humphrey Metrodome	3:25	54,735

This was the third postseason meeting between the Yankees and Twins. The Yankees swept the Twins to return to the ALCS for the first time since 2004.

In the first postseason game at the new Yankee Stadium, the Yankees blew out the Twins in part thanks to home runs from Derek Jeter and Hideki Matsui. In Game 2, the Twins took a 3-1 lead thanks to an RBI single from Nick Punto, but it wouldn’t hold as Alex Rodriguez hit a two-run home run in the bottom of the ninth to force extra innings. Mark Teixeira would win the game for the Yankees in the bottom of the eleventh with a walk-off home run to give them a 2–0 series lead headed to Minneapolis. In Game 3, the Twins again struck first with an RBI single from Joe Mauer in the bottom of the sixth, but it was quickly erased as A-Rod and Jorge Posada both hit solo home runs in the top of the seventh to put the Yankees in the lead for good. The Yankees added two more runs in the top of the ninth from Posada and Robinson Cano as they won 4-1 to complete the sweep. Game 3 was the last MLB game ever played at the Hubert H. Humphrey Metrodome.

The two teams would meet again in the ALDS in 2010 and 2019, with the Yankees sweeping both times, and the Wild Card Game in 2017, also won by the Yankees.

=== (2) Los Angeles Angels of Anaheim vs. (4) Boston Red Sox ===
Los Angeles won the series, 3–0.

Game	Date	Score	Location	Time	Attendance
1	October 8	Boston Red Sox – 0, Los Angeles Angels of Anaheim – 5	Angel Stadium of Anaheim	3:09	45,070
2	October 9	Boston Red Sox – 1, Los Angeles Angels of Anaheim – 4	Angel Stadium of Anaheim	3:11	45,223
3	October 11	Los Angeles Angels of Anaheim – 7, Boston Red Sox – 6	Fenway Park	3:49	38,704

This was the fifth postseason meeting between the Angels and Red Sox. After four failed attempts, the Angels finally broke through and swept the Red Sox to return to the ALCS for the third time this decade.

John Lackey pitched 7 1/3 innings of shutout baseball as the Angels shut out the Red Sox in Game 1. Jered Weaver outdueled Josh Beckett in Game 2 as the Angels took a 2–0 series lead headed to Fenway Park. In Game 3, the Red Sox took a 5-1 lead after four innings, but the Angels then rallied with a 6-1 run across the final four innings of the game to win 7-6 and complete the sweep, exacting long-awaited revenge on the team that eliminated them four consecutive times.

As of 2026, this is the last time the Angels won a playoff series.

== National League Division Series ==
=== (1) Los Angeles Dodgers vs. (3) St. Louis Cardinals ===
Los Angeles won the series, 3–0.

Game	Date	Score	Location	Time	Attendance
1	October 7	St. Louis Cardinals – 3, Los Angeles Dodgers – 5	Dodger Stadium	3:54	56,000
2	October 8	St. Louis Cardinals – 2, Los Angeles Dodgers – 3	Dodger Stadium	3:07	51,819
3	October 10	Los Angeles Dodgers – 5, St. Louis Cardinals – 1	Busch Stadium	3:02	47,296

This was the third postseason meeting in the history of the Cardinals-Dodgers rivalry (1985, 2004). The Dodgers swept the Cardinals to advance to the NLCS for the second year in a row.

A two-run homer from Matt Kemp in the bottom of the first gave the Dodgers a lead they wouldn’t relinquish as they took Game 1. Game 1 set a postseason record for runners left on base combined between the two teams with 30. Game 2 marked Clayton Kershaw’s postseason debut, and while he wouldn’t get the win (that would go to George Sherrill, the Dodgers won 3-2 to take a 2–0 series lead headed to St. Louis. Vicente Padilla pitched seven innings of shutout baseball as the Dodgers won 5-1 to complete the sweep.

Both teams would meet again in the NLCS in 2013, the NLDS in 2014, and the Wild Card Game in 2021, with the Cardinals winning the former two and the Dodgers winning the latter.

=== (2) Philadelphia Phillies vs. (4) Colorado Rockies ===
Philadelphia won the series, 3–1.

Game	Date	Score	Location	Time	Attendance
1	October 7	Colorado Rockies – 1, Philadelphia Phillies – 5	Citizens Bank Park	2:48	46,452
2	October 8	Colorado Rockies – 5, Philadelphia Phillies – 4	Citizens Bank Park	3:41	46,528
3	October 11	Philadelphia Phillies – 6, Colorado Rockies – 5	Coors Field	4:06	50,109
4	October 12	Philadelphia Phillies – 5, Colorado Rockies – 4	Coors Field	3:41	49,940

This was the second postseason meeting between the Rockies and Phillies. They last met in the NLDS two years prior, which was won by the Rockies before falling in the World Series. The Phillies defeated the Rockies in four games to advance to the NLCS for the second year in a row.

Cliff Lee pitched a complete game for the Phillies as they took Game 1 by a 5-1 score. In Game 2, the Rockies jumped out to a big lead in part thanks to a two-run home run from Yorvit Torrealba and a sacrifice fly from Dexter Fowler, and their bullpen held off a late rally by the Phillies to even the series headed to Denver. Game 3 was an offensive shootout between both teams, which was won by the Phillies thanks to a sacrifice fly from Ryan Howard in the top of the ninth. In Game 4, the Rockies led 3-2 and were two outs away from evening the series, but the Phillies rallied with three unanswered runs, capped off by a bloop RBI single from Jayson Werth, to take the lead for good. This was the only LDS series that didn’t end in a sweep, and was the first time in postseason history that all four division series were won on the road.

== American League Championship Series ==
=== (1) New York Yankees vs. (2) Los Angeles Angels of Anaheim ===
New York won the series, 4–2.

Game	Date	Score	Location	Time	Attendance
1	October 16	Los Angeles Angels of Anaheim – 1, New York Yankees – 4	Yankee Stadium	3:18	49,688
2	October 17	Los Angeles Angels of Anaheim – 3, New York Yankees – 4 (13)	Yankee Stadium	5:10	49,922
3	October 19	New York Yankees – 4, Los Angeles Angels of Anaheim – 5 (11)	Angel Stadium of Anaheim	4:21	44,911
4	October 20	New York Yankees – 10, Los Angeles Angels of Anaheim – 1	Angel Stadium of Anaheim	3:38	45,160
5	October 22	New York Yankees – 6, Los Angeles Angels of Anaheim – 7	Angel Stadium of Anaheim	3:34	45,113
6	October 25†	Los Angeles Angels of Anaheim – 2, New York Yankees – 5	Yankee Stadium	3:40	50,173

† Game 6 was originally scheduled to be played on Saturday, October 24, but was postponed because of rain.

This was the third postseason meeting between the Angels and Yankees (2002, 2005), and their first postseason meeting outside of the ALDS. The previous two meetings were won by the Angels. The Yankees defeated the Angels in six games to return to the World Series for the seventh time in thirteen years.

CC Sabathia and Mariano Rivera kept the Angels’ offense at bay in a 5-1 Yankees victory in Game 1. Game 2 went into extra innings thanks to a bases-loaded wild pitch by Yankees’ starter A. J. Burnett in the top of the fifth. The Angels took their first lead in the top of the eleventh, but Alex Rodriguez extended the game with a solo home run in the bottom of the inning. The Yankees would win in the bottom of the thirteenth thanks to Jerry Hairston Jr. storming home from second base. In Game 3, despite A-Rod, Derek Jeter, Johnny Damon, and Jorge Posada all homering for the Yankees, the Angels eked out a win after eleven innings thanks to an RBI double from backup catcher Jeff Mathis. In Game 4, the Yankees blew out the Angels to take a 3–1 series lead. In Game 5, the Angels took a 4-0 lead early, but it would be erased from a six-run seventh from the Yankees’ offense. However, the Angels retook the lead with three runs in the bottom of the seventh, and Brian Fuentes got the save to send the series back to the Bronx. Returning Yankee-legend Andy Pettitte and Rivera limited the damage done by the Angels’ bats as they guided New York to a 5-2 win and the pennant.

The Yankees would return to the ALCS the next year, but they lost to the Texas Rangers in six games. They would win their next pennant in 2024 over the now-Cleveland Guardians in five games.

As of 2026, this remains the last postseason appearance outside of the divisional round for the Angels, and the only time that both teams from the Greater Los Angeles area appeared in the LCS.

== National League Championship Series ==
=== (1) Los Angeles Dodgers vs. (2) Philadelphia Phillies ===
Philadelphia won the series, 4–1.

Game	Date	Score	Location	Time	Attendance
1	October 15	Philadelphia Phillies – 8, Los Angeles Dodgers – 6	Dodger Stadium	4:02	56,000
2	October 16	Philadelphia Phillies – 1, Los Angeles Dodgers – 2	Dodger Stadium	3:05	56,000
3	October 18	Los Angeles Dodgers – 0, Philadelphia Phillies – 11	Citizens Bank Park	3:12	45,721
4	October 19	Los Angeles Dodgers – 4, Philadelphia Phillies – 5	Citizens Bank Park	3:44	46,157
5	October 21	Los Angeles Dodgers – 4, Philadelphia Phillies – 10	Citizens Bank Park	3:40	46,214

This was the fifth postseason meeting between the Dodgers and Phillies. The Phillies once again defeated the Dodgers in five games to return to the World Series for the second year in a row (in the process denying a rematch of the 1981 World Series between the Dodgers and Yankees).

The Phillies stole Game 1 on the road after an offensive slugfest thanks to home runs from Carlos Ruiz and Raúl Ibañez. Game 2 was a pitchers’ duel that was won by the Dodgers as they prevailed by one run to even the series headed to Philadelphia. Cliff Lee pitched eight innings of shutout baseball as the Phillies blew out the Dodgers in Game 3. Jimmy Rollins hit a two-out walk-off two-run double in the bottom of the ninth inning of Game 4 to give the Phillies a 3–1 series lead. Jayson Werth, Shane Victorino, and Pedro Feliz all homered for the Phillies in Game 5 in another blowout win to clinch their second consecutive NL pennant.

The Phillies would return to the NLCS the next year, but were upset by the eventual World Series champion San Francisco Giants in six games. The Phillies would win their next pennant in 2022 over the San Diego Padres in five games before falling in the World Series.

The Dodgers returned to the NLCS in 2013, but lost to their archrival in the St. Louis Cardinals in six games. They would eventually win the pennant again in 2017 over the Chicago Cubs in five games before falling in the World Series.

Both teams would meet once more in the NLDS in 2025, where the Dodgers returned the favor and defeated the Phillies en route to a World Series title.

As of 2026, this is the only time where both teams from the Greater Los Angeles area appeared in the LCS.

== 2009 World Series ==
=== (AL1) New York Yankees vs. (NL2) Philadelphia Phillies ===
New York (AL) won the series, 4–2.

Game	Date	Score	Location	Time	Attendance
1	October 28	Philadelphia Phillies – 6, New York Yankees – 1	Yankee Stadium	3:27	50,207
2	October 29	Philadelphia Phillies – 1, New York Yankees − 3	Yankee Stadium	3:25	50,181
3	October 31	New York Yankees – 8, Philadelphia Phillies – 5	Citizens Bank Park	3:25	46,061
4	November 1	New York Yankees – 7, Philadelphia Phillies – 4	Citizens Bank Park	3:25	46,145
5	November 2	New York Yankees – 6, Philadelphia Phillies – 8	Citizens Bank Park	3:26	46,178
6	November 4	Philadelphia Phillies – 3, New York Yankees – 7	Yankee Stadium	3:52	50,315

This was the seventh New York–Pennsylvania matchup in the World Series (1905, 1911, 1913, 1927, 1950, 1960), and the second World Series matchup between the Yankees and Phillies. They previously met in the World Series in 1950, which the Yankees won in a sweep as part of a string of five consecutive championships from 1949 to 1953. The Yankees defeated the defending World Series champion Phillies in six games to win their first title since 2000.

In the first World Series game played at the new Yankee Stadium, Cliff Lee pitched a complete game as the Phillies stole Game 1. Lee made MLB history in several ways:

- This was the fourth postseason start of his career. In all four starts, he went at least seven innings and gave up no more than one earned run. The only other starting pitcher to accomplish such a feat was Christy Mathewson.
- He became the first left-handed starting pitcher to defeat the Yankees in the Bronx since Sandy Koufax in 1963.
- He was the first starting pitcher to throw a complete game without giving up an earned run against the Yankees in Game 1 of a postseason series.
- He was the first pitcher ever to strike out at least ten, walk no one, and give up no earned runs in a World Series start.

In Game 2, the Yankees evened the series off a solid seven-inning performance from A. J. Burnett. When the series shifted to Philadelphia for Game 3, it was an offensive slugfest that was won by the Yankees. Game 3 was also notable for being the first postseason game where instant replay was used to review a home run. In Game 4, the Phillies came back to tie the game in the bottom of the eighth, but the Yankees scored three unanswered runs in the top of the ninth to take the lead for good and go up 3–1 in the series. In Game 5, Lee had a solid seven-inning performance and closer Ryan Madson ended a late rally by the Yankees to send the series back to the Bronx. In Game 6, the Yankees got the lead early and didn’t relinquish it, and Andy Pettitte got his eighteenth postseason victory as the Yankees clinched their 27th title.

With the win, the Yankees improved their World Series record against the Pennsylvania-based teams to 3–1. As of 2026, this is the last World Series win by the Yankees franchise, and the most recent major professional sports championship won by a New York City-based team as the home team. During the next decade, the Yankees failed to win a single pennant, and would not return to the World Series again until 2024, losing to their old rival in the Los Angeles Dodgers in five games, becoming the second victim of the Dodgers dynasty of the 2020s.

With the loss, the Phillies’ record in the World Series fell to 2–5. The Phillies would return to the World Series in 2022, but were defeated by the Houston Astros in six games.

== Broadcasting ==
This was the third postseason under a seven-year U.S. rights agreement with Fox and TBS. TBS primarily aired all Division Series games, with sister network TNT used as an overflow channel. TBS also had the National League Championship Series. Fox televised the American League Championship Series and the World Series.
