= Mike Everitt (baseball) =

American baseball umpire (born 1964)

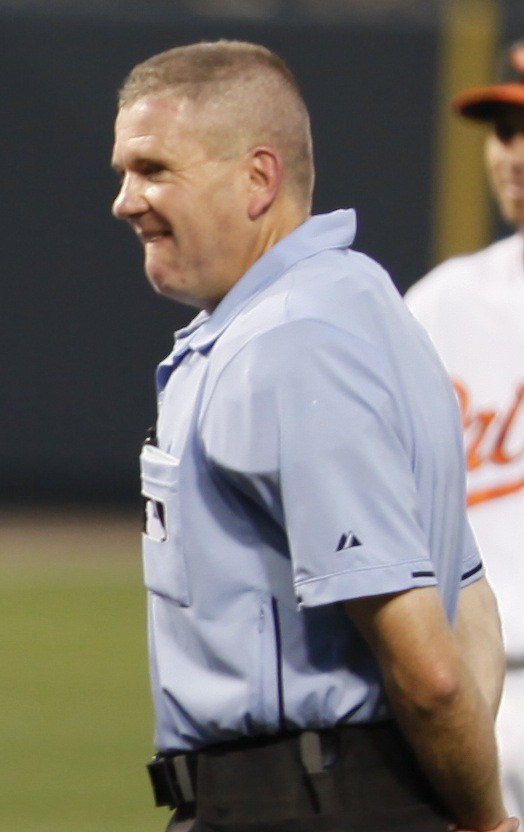
- Everitt in 2011
- Born: August 22, 1964 (age 60); Gallup, New Mexico, U.S.

debut
- June 20, 1996

Last appearance
- October 19, 2019

Career highlights and awards
- Special Assignments: Wild Card Games (2013, 2016, 2019); Division Series (2001, 2004, 2005, 2006, 2007, 2009, 2012, 2015, 2017); League Championship Series (2002, 2003, 2008, 2011, 2013, 2016, 2019 (replacement, starting Game 4)); All-Star Game (2006); World Series (2007, 2009, 2015)

Mike G. Everitt (born August 22, 1964) is an American former Major League Baseball umpire, who wore number 57. He worked in the American League from 1996 to 1999 and throughout both major leagues from 2000 to 2019.

== Early life ==
Everitt attended Aztec High School in Aztec, New Mexico. He played several sports at the school and graduated in 1982. He appeared in that year's Connie Mack World Series.

== Career ==
Over his major league career, Everitt has worked the All-Star Game one time 2006, the Wild Card Game three times (2013, 2016, 2019), the Division Series nine times (2001, 2004, 2005, 2006, 2007, 2009, 2012, 2015, 2017), the League Championship Series 6.5 times (2002, 2003, 2008, 2011, 2013, 2016, and the second half of the 2019 series starting in Game 4 after Jeff Nelson was removed after injury in Game 3), and the 2006 All-Star Game. Everitt has also umpired the World Series three times (2007, 2009 and 2015). Everitt was named a crew chief in February 2017.

Everitt was the first base umpire for Rickey Henderson's 3,000th hit on October 7, 2001; that game was also Tony Gwynn's final MLB game.

Everitt was the first base umpire on July 30, 2017, when Adrián Beltré of the Texas Rangers got his 3000th career hit against the Baltimore Orioles.

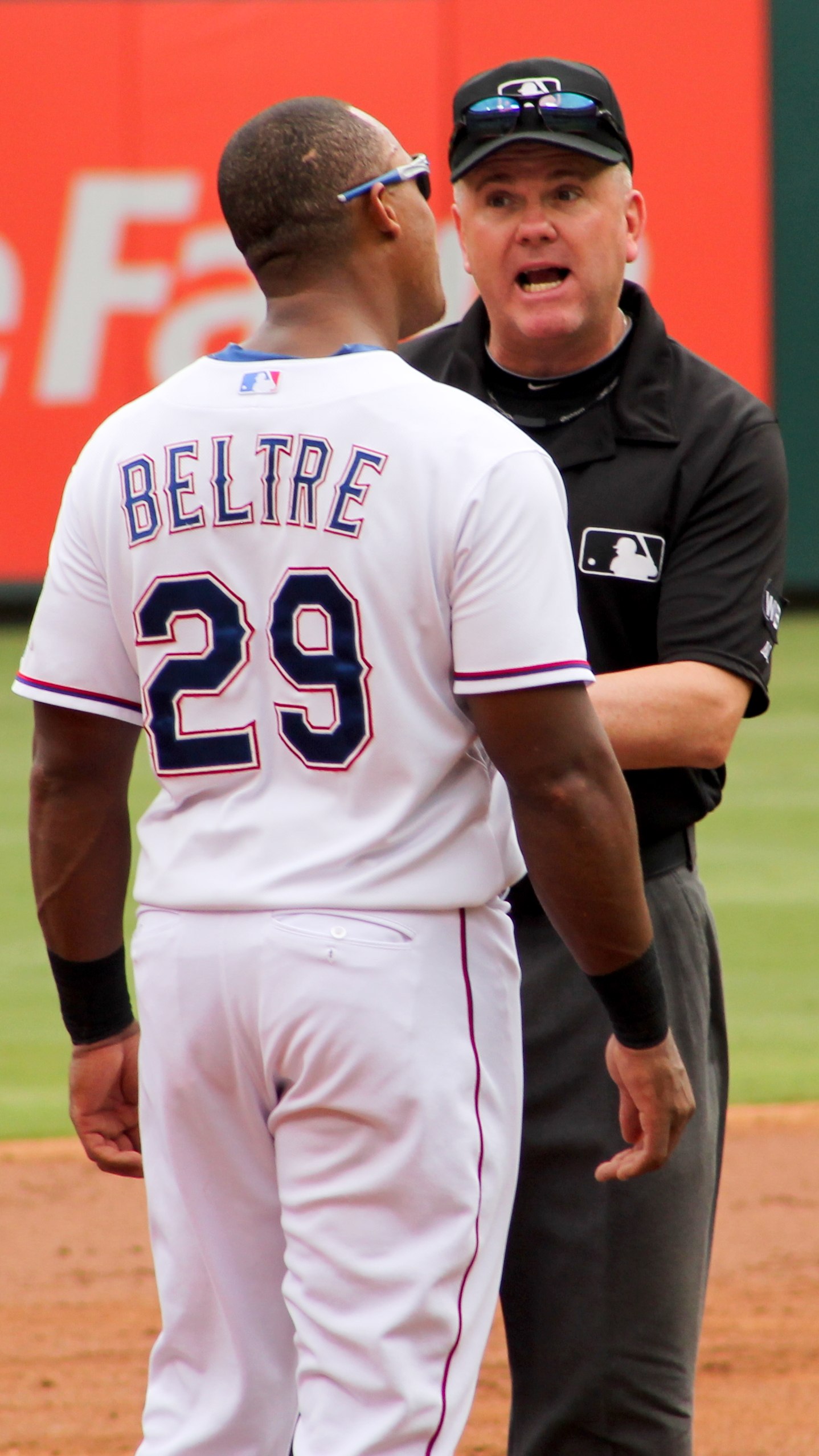
Everitt and Adrián Beltré playfully argue during a 2014 game

=== Controversies ===
On April 22, 2000, Everitt was the home plate umpire for a game between the Detroit Tigers and Chicago White Sox which featured two bench-clearing brawls, 11 ejections and 16 player suspensions which totaled 82 games. Managers Phil Garner of Detroit and Jerry Manuel of Chicago were each suspended eight games.

Everitt worked the 2003 National League Championship Series and was the left field umpire during Game 6, in which Chicago Cubs fan Steve Bartman arguably prevented Cubs left fielder Moisés Alou from catching a foul pop up hit by Florida Marlins second baseman Luis Castillo. Everitt ruled that the ball would have landed in the stands without Bartman's interference, and therefore Castillo was not out. Alou and Mark Prior vehemently protested the call to no avail and the Marlins proceeded to score 8 runs to win Game 6 and later the series.

During a San Diego Padres vs. Cubs game in Chicago, on June 16, 2007, Everitt was the plate umpire. Padres pitcher Chris Young hit Cubs first baseman Derrek Lee up and in with a pitch. Rather than getting in between Lee and Young as Lee exchanged words with Young, Everitt instead was talking to Padres catcher Rob Bowen about an unknown subject. Lee ended up throwing a punch at Young, who threw a punch back, starting a benches-clearing brawl. Young, Lee, and others were ejected. Cubs play-by-play announcer Len Kasper criticized and questioned Everitt for not getting in between Lee and Young to prevent a brawl.

During Game 4 of the 2009 World Series, between the New York Yankees and the Philadelphia Phillies, Pedro Feliz hit a two-out single with Ryan Howard on second. There was a play at the plate and replay shows that Howard clearly - barely but clearly - missed home. However, the ball rolled away from Yankee catcher Jorge Posada and CC Sabathia, backing up the play, threw to second to try to get Feliz going to second. It was at that point that Mike Everitt signaled Howard was safe at the plate, the correct ruling. Howard had not touched home, but had not been tagged out either: there was no call to make until Sabathia tried to make a play on Feliz, therefore losing the right to appeal that Howard missed home.

On August 20, 2013, after the Boston Red Sox lost to the San Francisco Giants on a walk-off walk to batter Marco Scutaro, Red Sox starting pitcher Jake Peavy openly criticized plate umpire Everitt, stating, "The last pitch [called ball four] was a strike...At the end of the day, for an umpire not to make the call to cost us a game, that's extremely unfortunate." Replays, however, indicate the pitch was located off the outer edge of home plate and correctly ruled a ball.

On June 30, 2016, in a game versus the St. Louis Cardinals at Busch Stadium, Everitt permitted the Kansas City Royals to challenge a double-play call at first base despite both teams having returned to their dugouts. Under normal MLB rules, both teams retiring to their dugouts would make the play no longer eligible for replay, but Everitt gave the Royals - as described by Everitt to Matheny - a "courtesy". St. Louis Cardinals manager Mike Matheny was immediately ejected for raising the point with Everitt.

On August 27, 2016, in a game between the Los Angeles Angels and Detroit Tigers at Comerica Park, Everitt made several contested strike calls against Detroit hitters, resulting in the eventual ejection of Tigers designated hitter Victor Martinez, Manager Brad Ausmus, and Hitting Coach Wally Joyner, and right fielder J. D. Martinez in three separate incidents.

== See also ==
- List of Major League Baseball umpires (disambiguation)
