= Cardinals–Dodgers rivalry =

Major League Baseball rivalry

- St. Louis Cardinals Los Angeles Dodgers
- Location: United States
- First meeting: May 29, 1884; Washington Park, Brooklyn, New York; Browns 0, Atlantics 1
- Latest meeting: September 3, 2026; Dodger Stadium, Los Angeles, California; Dodgers 3, Cardinals 2
- Next meeting: July 23, 2027; Busch Stadium, St. Louis, Missouri
- Stadiums: Cardinals: Busch Stadium; Dodgers: Dodger Stadium

Statistics
- Total meetings: 2,247
- All-time series: Cardinals, 1,131–1,098–18 (.507)
- Regular season series: Cardinals, 1,117–1,088–18 (.507)
- Postseason results: Cardinals, 14–10 (.583)
- Largest victory: Browns, 19–0 (August 15, 1886); Grooms, 20–4 (August 20, 1894); Dodgers, 20–4 (August 30, 1953)
- Longest win streak: Cardinals, 10 (July 30, 2005–May 14, 2007); Dodgers, 14 (June 5–August 22, 1951)
- Current win streak: Dodgers, 1

Post-season history
- 1985 NL Championship Series: Cardinals won, 4–2; 2004 NL Division Series: Cardinals won, 3–1; 2009 NL Division Series: Dodgers won, 3–0; 2013 NL Championship Series: Cardinals won, 4–2; 2014 NL Division Series: Cardinals won, 3–1; 2021 NL Wild Card Game: Dodgers won

Locations of the St. Louis Cardinals and Los Angeles Dodgers

The Cardinals–Dodgers rivalry is a Major League Baseball (MLB) National League rivalry played between the St. Louis Cardinals and the Los Angeles Dodgers. The Cardinals and Dodgers are two of the most successful franchises in the National League, combining for 20 World Series titles, 11 for St. Louis and 9 for the Dodgers.

== Background ==
Both the Cardinals and Dodgers are two of the oldest franchises in the MLB, predating its 1901 creation. The two teams first met during the 1884 season as members of the American Association. The Cardinals franchise (originally known as the Browns) began in 1882 in St. Louis, Missouri and the Dodgers franchise (originally known as the Atlantics, Grays, and Bridegrooms) began in 1883 in Brooklyn, New York. The Bridgegrooms joined the National League in 1890, while the Browns joined the National League in 1892. Following 77 consecutive seasons in a single-league structure, the National League instituted divisions in 1969, which led to the two teams not playing in the same division. However, frequent close pennant races and matchups in the postseason caused the rivalry to grow in intensity through the decades, particularly during the mid-1960s, 1980s, and 2000s–2010s. From 1963 to 1968, either the Cardinals or Dodgers represented the National League in the World Series. Both teams have met each other 2,211 times in the regular season, with 24 postseason games between them. The Cardinals currently have the most regular season wins at 1,113, and the most postseason wins at 14.

Though not as heated as the Dodgers–Giants or Cardinals–Cubs rivalries, there is more mutual respect between both teams; though animosity steadily grew between the teams in the 2010s.

== History ==
=== 1940s: First hints at a rivalry and integration ===
The Cardinals–Dodgers rivalry was particularly intense from 1941 through 1949. In his autobiography written in 1948, Leo Durocher, who managed the Dodgers for most of the 1940s, described the Cardinals as being "our old rivals." During this period, the Cardinals won the National League pennant 4 times (with the Dodgers finishing 2nd twice) and the Dodgers won the National League pennant 3 times (with the Cardinals finishing 2nd each time). In 1942 the Cardinals overcame a 10-game Dodger lead in early August to win the pennant. In 1946 the Cardinals and Dodgers finished the regular season tied for first place but the Cardinals won the pennant when they prevailed in the first ever playoff tiebreaker in the National League. Cardinal Hall of Famer Enos Slaughter said during this period of the Cardinals–Dodgers rivalry that "We loved to hate them and they loved to hate us."

During this period, after the 1942 season, Branch Rickey, who had built up the Cardinals farm system as their general manager moved to become the Dodgers' general manager. In 1947, after Rickey broke the color line by signing Jackie Robinson to the Dodgers, there were rumors that southerners playing for the Cardinals were planning to boycott games against the Dodgers, although the players later denied it. In general, the Cardinals were latecomers to integration. Front-office executive Bing Devine said the owner from 1947 to 1953, Fred Saigh, refused to sign black players. There was a widespread belief that St. Louis was, in many ways, a Southern city. In the mid-1950s many of its stores and restaurants refused to serve black customers. The Cardinals, with baseball's largest radio network blanketing the Midwest and South, had cultivated white Southern fans. Their ballpark was also the last in the majors to abolish segregated seating. Because of their lack of black players, the Cardinals play suffered on the field tremendously in the 1950s. Meanwhile, with the success of Robinson, the Dodgers doubled down on the opportunity to sign players of color from the Negro leagues. In the subsequent years after their pennant-winning season in 1947, they would sign Don Newcombe, Roy Campanella, and Jim Gilliam from the Negro leagues, adding to an already tremendous team. The Dodgers made the World Series in 1949, 1952, 1953, 1955, 1956, and 1959 (winning championships in 1955 and 1959) and were a historic pennant race away from making it in 1951, in part because they were the first to accept African American players. The 1951 season included a 14-game winning streak for the Dodgers against the Cardinals, the longest such streak in the rivalry.

=== 1960s: Dodgers move West, the 1963 pennant race, and alternating World Series appearances ===
By their 1959 World Series victory, the Dodgers had moved from Brooklyn to Los Angeles the previous year. The Dodgers (and Giants) moving to California meant that the St. Louis Cardinals were no longer the furthest team West.

The rivalry renewed in 1963 when the Cardinals won 19 out of 20 games to almost overtake a large Dodger lead in the standings, although the Dodgers ultimately prevailed to win the pennant. The streak reminded people (including Cardinal Hall of Famer Stan Musial, who started in 1941 and was in his final season in 1963) of the 1942 performance, despite the result. From 1963 to 1968, either the Cardinals or Dodgers represented the National League in the World Series. 1963, 1965, and 1966 for Los Angeles and 1964, 1967, and 1968 for St. Louis. This streak nearly extended to 1962, but the Dodgers were beaten in the 1962 National League tie-breaker by the Giants in three games. By the 1960s, some of the best Cardinals players were of color, such as Bob Gibson, Lou Brock, Curt Flood, Orlando Cepeda, and Bill White, as the team was more open to accepting players of color at this time.

For the Cardinals, the 1970s represented one of the dimmest period as a franchise as they finished the decade with a .496 winning percentage, the lowest until that point since the 1910s. The Dodgers maintained their postseason contender status, despite having a dip in performance in the late 1960s after the sudden retirement of Sandy Koufax following the 1966 World Series. In the 1970s, the Dodgers made three World Series (1974, 1977, 1978), but were defeated in all three. In some respect, the Cincinnati Reds took the Cardinals place as the Dodgers' Midwest foe, particularly throughout the mid-1970s.

=== 1980s: First postseason match-up, Ozzie Smith, and Pedro Guerrero for John Tudor ===
Since divisional baseball started in 1969, the Cardinals and Dodgers have met six times in the postseason with two meetings in the NLCS falling in favor of the Cardinals. The two teams nearly met in the 1982 National League Championship Series, but a late Dodgers collapse in the regular season prevented that from happening (the Cardinals won the 1982 pennant and World Series). In what could be considered biggest moment in the rivalry, the two teams finally played each other in the 1985 National League Championship Series for their first postseason match-up. The series is best known for Ozzie Smith's dramatic walk-off home run in Game 5 and Jack Clark's series-winning home run in Game 6 at Dodger Stadium. To add extra significance, it was Smith's first career home-run batting left handed, as he was a switch-hitter, with all of his power coming from the right-side. Smith's Game 5 walk-off home run was voted the greatest moment in the history of Busch Stadium in 2005, and was the source of Jack Buck's famous call "Go crazy, folks! Go crazy!".

In 1988, the two teams completed a controversial, yet beneficial blockbuster trade when John Tudor was traded to the Dodgers in exchange for Pedro Guerrero at the trade deadline. The Dodgers won the World Series in 1988, as Tudor helped stabilize the Dodgers' rotation down the stretch, going 4–3 in nine starts with a 2.41 ERA, although he was mostly ineffective in the postseason. To complete the trade, Guerrero signed a three-year contract with the Cardinals. He enjoyed another All-Star season in 1989, hitting .311/.391/.477 with 17 home runs, 117 runs batted in and a league-leading 42 doubles and finished third in NL MVP voting. It was the third time he finished third in MVP voting in his career (the other two being 1982 and 1985). To date, this is the most significant trade between the Cardinals and Dodgers.

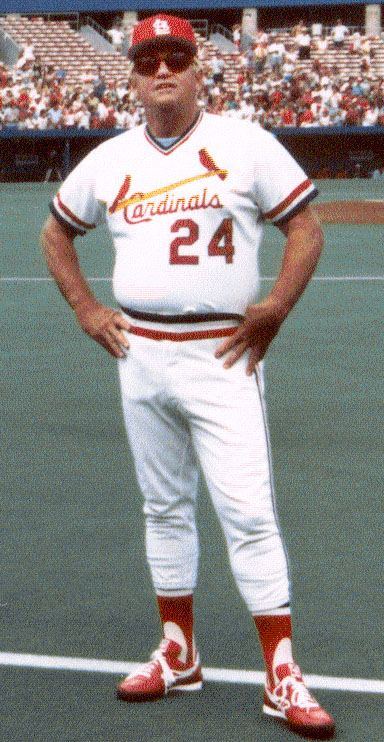
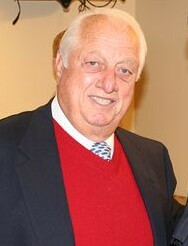
Two of the most successful National League managers of the 1980s, Whitey Herzog (left) and Tommy Lasorda (right)

Overall in the 1980s, the Dodgers and Cardinals dominated the National League. With timely hitting, good defense, and dominant pitching, the Dodgers won two World Series in the decade (1981, 1988), made the postseason four times (1981, 1983, 1985, 1988), and played in a one-game playoff in 1980. With the omnipresent threat of the stolen base and big time clutch hitting, the Cardinals reign of dominance earned three World Series appearances in 1982, 1985, and 1987, winning their lone championship of the decade in 1982. Both teams had what could be considered a lean period for a storied franchise after this era. The Dodgers did not seriously challenge in the National League West again until 1991 and did not make the postseason again until 1995. After 1987, the Cardinals did not make the postseason again until 1996, which by this time they were in the newly created National League Central division. Additionally, Hall of Fame managers Whitey Herzog and Tommy Lasorda retired by the time the rivalry sparked again.

The next significant moments of the rivalry came during the 1990s, which were a period inconsistent play for both teams. On June 29, 1990, long-time Dodgers ace pitcher Fernando Valenzuela had his last great moment of his career when he threw a no-hitter against the St. Louis Cardinals just hours after the Oakland Athletics' Dave Stewart threw one. It was only time two no-hitters were thrown on the same day. On August 10, 1995, the Cardinals-Dodgers game at Dodger Stadium was forfeited after fans hurled giveaway baseballs onto the field in disgust over bad calls and player ejections throughout the game. The Dodgers had to forfeit their game against the Cardinals with one out in the bottom of the ninth. "It was unbelievable," Dodgers manager Tommy Lasorda said at the time, according to the Los Angeles Times. "I've never seen anything like this. I'm disappointed in the ones who threw the balls, not the good fans." On April 23, 1999, St. Louis Cardinals Fernando Tatís made baseball history when he hit two grand slams in one inning. He is the only batter in MLB history to accomplish this feat. Tatís hit both of his grand slams against starting pitcher Chan Ho Park of the Los Angeles Dodgers. With these two grand slams, Tatís also set a Major League record with eight runs batted in during a single inning.

=== 2000s–2010s: More postseason match-ups and Cardinals dominance ===
The Cardinals did not play the Dodgers again in the postseason until 2004 when the heavily favored Cardinals defeated the Dodgers in four games in the National League Division Series; however, the Cardinals lost the World Series to the Red Sox in a four-game sweep. The 2004 NLDS was a microcosm of the Cardinals' early-to-mid 2000s dominance of the Dodgers, who did not defeat their rivals during a 10-game stretch from 2005 through 2007. But in 2009, the Dodgers beat the Cardinals in the National League Division Series in a three-game sweep. The series was highlighted by a Game 2 Matt Holliday gaffe in left-field when he lost a James Loney fly ball in the lights to put the tying run aboard. Later in the inning, pinch hitter Mark Loretta came through for Los Angeles with a single up the middle to give them the walk-off win and a commanding 2–0 series lead. In 2011, the Dodgers, out of postseason contention by the end of July, sent the Cardinals Rafael Furcal at the trade deadline. Although he only hit .179 in the World Series, he hit .255 with 7 home runs down the stretch in the regular season. The Cardinals won the championship, beating the Texas Rangers in a classic seven-game series. To date, this is their last World Series.

The Cardinals avenged their loss from 2009 to the Dodgers, defeating them in the 2013 National League Championship Series in six games. The Dodgers remember the series for Joe Kelly hitting Hanley Ramirez in the hand during the first inning of game one, which reduced the effectiveness of the Dodgers' best hitter for the entire series. Kelly would later become a Dodger and a fan-favorite, helping them win a World Series in 2020. The Cardinals bested the Dodgers again during the 2014 National League Division Series, getting the better of 2013–2014 Cy Young Award and 2014 Most Valuable Player winner Clayton Kershaw. Between the 2013 National League Championship Series and the 2014 National League Division Series, the Cardinals beat Kershaw in all four of his starts, highlighted by a series-winning home run from Matt Adams in Game 4 of the 2014 NLDS off a tiring Kershaw in the seventh inning. Game 1 also saw a heated altercation between Cardinals’ catcher Yadier Molina and Dodgers’ outfielder Yasiel Puig culminating in both benches clearing following a stray pitch from Cardinals’ pitcher Adam Wainwright. The Dodgers season ended at the hands of the Cardinals in 2004, 2013, and 2014 and they often lost the regular season series, particularly in the 2000s.

The Cardinals and Dodgers won two pennants apiece in the 2010s: the Cardinals went 1–1 in their World Series appearances (2011, 2013); the Dodgers, 0–2 (2017, 2018).

=== 2020s: Dodgers flip the script, Tommy Edman trade ===
The Dodgers ended their 32-year drought in 2020, winning their first World Series since 1988.

The two teams met again in the postseason in the 2021 National League Wild Card Game, with the Dodgers winning in the ninth on a two-run Chris Taylor walk-off home run.

The next significant moment of the rivalry occurred at the 2024 trade deadline, when the Dodgers traded for Cardinals utility player Tommy Edman. Edman would win the NLCS MVP and help the Dodgers win the World Series, the first of two consecutive championships. The Cardinals improved on their dismal 2023 season, but failed to qualify for the 2024 postseason. and as of 2026, they have not made the postseason since 2022.

== Season-by-season results ==
Cardinals vs. Dodgers Season-by-Season Results
1880s (Browns, 69–35–2)

Season	Season series		at St. Louis Browns	at Brooklyn Atlantics/Grays/Bridegrooms	Overall series	Notes
1884	Browns	7‍–‍2‍–‍1	Browns, 5‍–‍0	Tie, 2‍–‍2‍–‍1	Browns; 7‍–‍2‍–‍1	
1885	Browns	12‍–‍4	Browns, 7‍–‍0	Browns, 5‍–‍4	Browns; 19‍–‍6‍–‍1	Atlantics change their name to "Grays"; Browns tie 1885 pre-modern World Series, though Browns claim game 2 forfeit didn't count and therefore claim the championship.
1886	Browns	13‍–‍7	Browns, 7‍–‍3	Browns, 6‍–‍4	Browns; 32‍–‍13‍–‍1	Browns win 1886 pre-modern World Series
1887	Browns	16‍–‍4	Browns, 8‍–‍2	Browns, 8‍–‍2	Browns; 48‍–‍17‍–‍1	Browns lose 1887 pre-modern World Series
1888	Tie	10‍–‍10‍–‍1	Browns, 6‍–‍4	Bridegrooms, 6‍–‍4‍–‍1	Browns; 58‍–‍27‍–‍2	Grays change their name to "Bridegrooms"; Browns lose 1888 pre-modern World Series
1889	Browns	11‍–‍8	Browns, 6‍–‍4	Bridegrooms, 5‍–‍4	Browns; 69‍–‍35‍–‍2	Bridegrooms' last season in the American Association, before switching to the National League. Bridegrooms lose 1889 pre-modern World Series

1890s ((Bride)grooms/Superbas, 63–36–3)

Season	Season series		at St. Louis Browns/Perfectos	at Brooklyn (Bride)grooms/Superbas	Overall series	Notes
1892	Grooms	9‍–‍5‍–‍1	Grooms, 3‍–‍4	Grooms, 5‍–‍2‍–‍1	Browns; 74‍–‍44‍–‍3	Bridegrooms have since changed their name to "Grooms"; Browns join the National League
1893	Grooms	8‍–‍4	Browns, 4‍–‍2	Grooms, 6‍–‍0	Browns; 78‍–‍52‍–‍3	
1894	Grooms	8‍–‍4	Grooms, 4‍–‍2	Grooms, 4‍–‍2	Browns; 82‍–‍60‍–‍3	
1895	Grooms	9‍–‍3	Tie, 3‍–‍3	Grooms, 6‍–‍0	Browns; 85‍–‍69‍–‍3	
1896	Bridgegrooms	7‍–‍5	Browns, 4‍–‍2	Bridegrooms, 5‍–‍1	Browns; 90‍–‍76‍–‍3	
1897	Bridgegrooms	7‍–‍5	Tie, 3‍–‍3	Bridegrooms, 4‍–‍2	Browns; 95‍–‍83‍–‍3	Grooms change their name to "Bridegrooms"
1898	Bridgegrooms	7‍–‍6‍–‍1	Browns, 4‍–‍3	Bridegrooms, 4‍–‍2‍–‍1	Browns; 101‍–‍90‍–‍4	
1899	Superbas	8‍–‍4‍–‍1	Superbas, 5‍–‍2‍–‍1	Superbas, 3‍–‍2	Perfectos; 105‍–‍98‍–‍5	Browns change their name to "Perfectos."; Bridegrooms change their name to "Superbas," win 1899 NL pennant.

1900s (Superbas, 114–93–5)

Season	Season series		at St. Louis Cardinals	at Brooklyn Superbas	Overall series	Notes
1900	Superbas	13‍–‍7	Superbas, 7‍–‍3	Superbas, 6‍–‍4	Cardinals; 112‍–‍111‍–‍5	Perfectos change their name to "Cardinals."; The September 19 game was forfeited to the Dodgers, giving them a home win. Superbas win 1900 NL pennant. Superbas win the 1900 Chronicle-Telegraph Cup.
1901	Cardinals	11‍–‍9	Cardinals, 6‍–‍4	Tie, 5‍–‍5	Cardinals; 123‍–‍120‍–‍5	
1902	Superbas	10‍–‍9‍–‍2	Cardinals, 7‍–‍3‍–‍2	Superbas, 7‍–‍2	Cardinals; 132‍–‍130‍–‍7	
1903	Superbas	14‍–‍4‍–‍1	Superbas, 6‍–‍2‍–‍1	Superbas, 8‍–‍2	Superbas; 144‍–‍136‍–‍8	
1904	Cardinals	15‍–‍7	Cardinals, 9‍–‍2	Cardinals, 6‍–‍5	Tie; 151‍–‍151‍–‍8	
1905	Cardinals	12‍–‍10	Cardinals, 7‍–‍5	Tie, 5‍–‍5	Cardinals; 163‍–‍161‍–‍8	
1906	Superbas	13‍–‍8‍–‍1	Superbas, 6‍–‍5	Superbas, 7‍–‍3‍–‍1	Superbas; 174‍–‍171‍–‍9	
1907	Superbas	14‍–‍8	Superbas, 6‍–‍5	Superbas, 8‍–‍3	Superbas; 188‍–‍179‍–‍9	
1908	Superbas	13‍–‍9	Superbas, 7‍–‍4	Superbas, 6‍–‍5	Superbas; 201‍–‍188‍–‍9	
1909	Superbas	12‍–‍10‍–‍1	Cardinals, 7‍–‍4‍–‍1	Superbas, 8‍–‍3	Superbas; 213‍–‍198‍–‍10	

1910s (Superbas/(Trolley) Dodgers/Robins, 105–104–1)

Season	Season series		at St. Louis Cardinals	at Brooklyn Superbas/(Trolley) Dodgers/Robins	Overall series	Notes
1910	Superbas	12‍–‍10	Cardinals, 7‍–‍4	Superbas, 8‍–‍3	Superbas; 225‍–‍208‍–‍10	
1911	Cardinals	11‍–‍9‍–‍1	Trolley Dodgers, 5‍–‍4‍–‍1	Cardinals, 7‍–‍4	Trolley Dodgers; 234‍–‍219‍–‍11	Superbas change name to "Trolley Dodgers"
1912	Trolley Dodgers	11‍–‍10	Cardinals, 8‍–‍3	Trolley Dodgers, 8‍–‍2	Trolley Dodgers; 245‍–‍229‍–‍11	
1913	Dodgers	13‍–‍7	Dodgers, 5‍–‍4	Trolley Dodgers, 8‍–‍3	Dodgers; 258‍–‍236‍–‍11	Trolley Dodgers shorten name to "Dodgers"
1914	Cardinals	17‍–‍5	Cardinals, 10‍–‍1	Cardinals, 7‍–‍4	Robins; 263‍–‍253‍–‍11	Dodgers change name to "Robins"
1915	Tie	11‍–‍11	Cardinals, 7‍–‍4	Robins, 7‍–‍4	Robins; 274‍–‍264‍–‍11	
1916	Robins	15‍–‍7	Robins, 6‍–‍5	Robins, 9‍–‍2	Robins; 289‍–‍271‍–‍11	Robins lose 1916 World Series
1917	Cardinals	11‍–‍10	Cardinals, 8‍–‍3	Robins, 7‍–‍3	Robins; 299‍–‍282‍–‍11	
1918	Cardinals	11‍–‍8	Cardinals, 7‍–‍4	Tie, 4‍–‍4	Robins; 307‍–‍293‍–‍11	
1919	Robins	11‍–‍9	Cardinals, 6‍–‍4	Robins, 7‍–‍3	Robins; 318‍–‍302‍–‍11	

1920s (Cardinals, 119–101)

Season	Season series		at St. Louis Cardinals	at Brooklyn Robins	Overall series	Notes
1920	Robins	15‍–‍7	Robins, 7‍–‍3	Robins, 8‍–‍4	Robins; 333‍–‍309‍–‍11	Cardinals move to Sportsman's Park; Robins lose 1920 World Series
1921	Cardinals	14‍–‍8	Cardinals, 9‍–‍2	Robins, 6‍–‍5	Robins; 341‍–‍323‍–‍11	
1922	Cardinals	14‍–‍8	Cardinals, 8‍–‍3	Cardinals, 6‍–‍5	Robins; 349‍–‍337‍–‍11	
1923	Cardinals	12‍–‍10	Cardinals, 6‍–‍5	Cardinals, 6‍–‍5	Robins; 359‍–‍349‍–‍11	
1924	Robins	15‍–‍7	Robins, 7‍–‍4	Robins, 8‍–‍3	Robins; 374‍–‍356‍–‍11	
1925	Tie	11‍–‍11	Cardinals, 8‍–‍3	Robins, 8‍–‍3	Robins; 385‍–‍367‍–‍11	
1926	Cardinals	15‍–‍7	Cardinals, 6‍–‍5	Cardinals, 9‍–‍2	Robins; 392‍–‍382‍–‍11	Cardinals win 1926 World Series
1927	Cardinals	14‍–‍8	Cardinals, 8‍–‍3	Cardinals, 6‍–‍5	Robins; 400‍–‍396‍–‍11	
1928	Cardinals	13‍–‍9	Robins, 6‍–‍5	Cardinals, 8‍–‍3	Tie; 409‍–‍409‍–‍11	Cardinals lose 1928 World Series
1929	Cardinals	12‍–‍10	Cardinals, 7‍–‍4	Robins, 6‍–‍5	Cardinals; 421‍–‍419‍–‍11	

1930s (Cardinals, 127–91–2)

Season	Season series		at St. Louis Cardinals	at Brooklyn Robins/Dodgers	Overall series	Notes
1930	Tie	11‍–‍11	Robins, 6‍–‍5	Cardinals, 6‍–‍5	Cardinals; 432‍–‍430‍–‍11	Cardinals lose 1930 World Series
1931	Cardinals	12‍–‍10	Cardinals, 6‍–‍5	Cardinals, 6‍–‍5	Cardinals; 444‍–‍440‍–‍11	Cardinals win 1931 World Series
1932	Dodgers	14‍–‍8	Cardinals, 6‍–‍5	Robins, 9‍–‍2	Dodgers; 454‍–‍452‍–‍11	Robins change their name to "Dodgers"
1933	Cardinals	12‍–‍9	Dodgers, 6‍–‍4	Cardinals, 8‍–‍3	Cardinals; 464‍–‍463‍–‍11	
1934	Cardinals	15‍–‍7	Cardinals, 7‍–‍4	Cardinals, 8‍–‍3	Cardinals; 479‍–‍470‍–‍11	On June 21, Cardinals take a 467–466–11 series lead, a lead the Cardinals have not relinquished to this day. Cardinals win 1934 World Series
1935	Cardinals	16‍–‍6	Cardinals, 8‍–‍3	Cardinals, 8‍–‍3	Cardinals; 495‍–‍476‍–‍11	
1936	Cardinals	13‍–‍9	Cardinals, 6‍–‍4	Cardinals, 7‍–‍5	Cardinals; 508‍–‍485‍–‍11	
1937	Cardinals	15‍–‍7‍–‍1	Cardinals, 9‍–‍3	Cardinals, 6‍–‍4‍–‍1	Cardinals; 523‍–‍492‍–‍12	
1938	Cardinals	12‍–‍9‍–‍1	Cardinals, 6‍–‍5	Cardinals, 6‍–‍4‍–‍1	Cardinals; 535‍–‍501‍–‍13	
1939	Cardinals	13‍–‍9	Cardinals, 8‍–‍3	Dodgers, 6‍–‍5	Cardinals; 548‍–‍510‍–‍13	

1940s (Cardinals, 132–90–5)

Season	Season series		at St. Louis Cardinals	at Brooklyn Dodgers	Overall series	Notes
1940	Cardinals	13‍–‍9‍–‍1	Cardinals, 6‍–‍5	Cardinals, 7‍–‍4‍–‍1	Cardinals; 561‍–‍519‍–‍14	
1941	Tie	11‍–‍11‍–‍1	Cardinals, 6‍–‍5‍–‍1	Dodgers, 6‍–‍5	Cardinals; 572‍–‍530‍–‍15	Dodgers lose 1941 World Series
1942	Cardinals	13‍–‍9	Cardinals, 8‍–‍3	Dodgers, 6‍–‍5	Cardinals; 585‍–‍539‍–‍15	Cardinals win 1942 World Series
1943	Cardinals	15‍–‍7	Cardinals, 8‍–‍3	Cardinals, 7‍–‍4	Cardinals; 600‍–‍546‍–‍15	Cardinals lose 1943 World Series
1944	Cardinals	18‍–‍4	Cardinals, 10‍–‍1	Cardinals, 8‍–‍3	Cardinals; 618‍–‍550‍–‍15	Cardinals win 1944 World Series
1945	Cardinals	13‍–‍9	Cardinals, 6‍–‍5	Cardinals, 7‍–‍4	Cardinals; 631‍–‍559‍–‍15	
1946	Cardinals	16‍–‍8	Cardinals, 9‍–‍3	Cardinals, 7‍–‍5	Cardinals; 647‍–‍567‍–‍15	Cardinals win 1946 World Series
1947	Tie	11‍–‍11‍–‍1	Dodgers, 6‍–‍5	Cardinals, 6‍–‍5‍–‍1	Cardinals; 658‍–‍578‍–‍16	Dodgers 2B Jackie Robinson becomes the first African-American player in MLB history. Dodgers lose 1947 World Series
1948	Dodgers	12‍–‍10	Dodgers, 7‍–‍4	Cardinals, 6‍–‍5	Cardinals; 668‍–‍590‍–‍16	
1949	Cardinals	12‍–‍10‍–‍2	Dodgers, 6‍–‍5‍–‍1	Cardinals, 7‍–‍4‍–‍1	Cardinals; 680‍–‍600‍–‍18	Dodgers lose 1949 World Series

1950s (Dodgers, 135–85)

Season	Season series		at St. Louis Cardinals	at Brooklyn/Los Angeles Dodgers	Overall series	Notes
1950	Dodgers	12‍–‍10	Cardinals, 6‍–‍5	Dodgers, 7‍–‍4	Cardinals; 690‍–‍612‍–‍18	
1951	Dodgers	18‍–‍4	Dodgers, 9‍–‍2	Dodgers, 9‍–‍2	Cardinals; 694‍–‍630‍–‍18	
1952	Tie	11‍–‍11	Dodgers, 7‍–‍4	Cardinals, 7‍–‍4	Cardinals; 705‍–‍641‍–‍18	Dodgers lose 1952 World Series
1953	Dodgers	15‍–‍7	Cardinals, 7‍–‍4	Dodgers, 11‍–‍0	Cardinals; 712‍–‍656‍–‍18	Dodgers lose 1953 World Series
1954	Dodgers	14‍–‍8	Dodgers, 6‍–‍5	Dodgers, 8‍–‍3	Cardinals; 720‍–‍670‍–‍18	
1955	Dodgers	14‍–‍8	Cardinals, 6‍–‍5	Dodgers, 9‍–‍2	Cardinals; 728‍–‍684‍–‍18	Dodgers win 1955 World Series
1956	Dodgers	16‍–‍6	Dodgers, 8‍–‍3	Dodgers, 8‍–‍3	Cardinals; 734‍–‍700‍–‍18	Dodgers lose 1956 World Series
1957	Dodgers	12‍–‍10	Dodgers, 6‍–‍5	Dodgers, 6‍–‍5	Cardinals; 744‍–‍712‍–‍18	
1958	Tie	11‍–‍11	Cardinals, 7‍–‍4	Dodgers, 7‍–‍4	Cardinals; 755‍–‍723‍–‍18	Dodgers relocate to Los Angeles, playing at Los Angeles Memorial Coliseum
1959	Dodgers	12‍–‍10	Dodgers, 6‍–‍5	Dodgers, 6‍–‍5	Cardinals; 765‍–‍735‍–‍18	Dodgers win 1959 World Series

1960s (Tie, 91–91)

Season	Season series		at St. Louis Cardinals	at Los Angeles Dodgers	Overall series	Notes
1960	Cardinals	12‍–‍10	Cardinals, 8‍–‍3	Dodgers, 7‍–‍4	Cardinals; 777‍–‍745‍–‍18	
1961	Dodgers	12‍–‍10	Cardinals, 6‍–‍5	Dodgers, 7‍–‍4	Cardinals; 787‍–‍757‍–‍18	
1962	Cardinals	11‍–‍7	Dodgers, 5‍–‍4	Cardinals, 7‍–‍2	Cardinals; 798‍–‍764‍–‍18	Dodgers open Dodger Stadium. NL expansion reduces the schedule to 18 meetings per year.
1963	Dodgers	12‍–‍6	Dodgers, 7‍–‍2	Dodgers, 5‍–‍4	Cardinals; 804‍–‍776‍–‍18	
1964	Dodgers	10‍–‍8	Cardinals, 5‍–‍4	Dodgers, 6‍–‍3	Cardinals; 812‍–‍786‍–‍18	Cardinals win 1964 World Series
1965	Dodgers	12‍–‍6	Dodgers, 7‍–‍2	Dodgers, 5‍–‍4	Cardinals; 818‍–‍798‍–‍18	Dodgers win 1965 World Series
1966	Dodgers	10‍–‍8	Dodgers, 6‍–‍3	Cardinals, 5‍–‍4	Cardinals; 826‍–‍808‍–‍18	Cardinals open Busch Memorial Stadium; Dodgers lose 1966 World Series
1967	Cardinals	12‍–‍6	Cardinals, 7‍–‍2	Cardinals, 5‍–‍4	Cardinals; 838‍–‍814‍–‍18	Cardinals win 1967 World Series
1968	Tie	9‍–‍9	Dodgers, 5‍–‍4	Cardinals, 5‍–‍4	Cardinals; 847‍–‍823‍–‍18	Cardinals lose 1968 World Series
1969	Cardinals	9‍–‍3	Cardinals, 5‍–‍1	Cardinals, 4‍–‍2	Cardinals; 856‍–‍826‍–‍18	MLB's expansion and realignment placed the Cardinals in the NL East and the Dodgers in the NL West. New division alignment shortens meetings from 18 to 12 games.

1970s (Dodgers, 67–53)

Season	Season series		at St. Louis Cardinals	at Los Angeles Dodgers	Overall series	Notes
1970	Dodgers	7‍–‍5	Dodgers, 5‍–‍1	Cardinals, 4‍–‍2	Cardinals; 861‍–‍833‍–‍18	
1971	Tie	6‍–‍6	Tie, 3‍–‍3	Tie, 3‍–‍3	Cardinals; 867‍–‍839‍–‍18	
1972	Dodgers	8‍–‍4	Dodgers, 4‍–‍2	Dodgers, 4‍–‍2	Cardinals; 871‍–‍847‍–‍18	
1973	Dodgers	8‍–‍4	Tie, 3‍–‍3	Dodgers, 5‍–‍1	Cardinals; 875‍–‍855‍–‍18	
1974	Tie	6‍–‍6	Dodgers, 4‍–‍2	Cardinals, 4‍–‍2	Cardinals; 881‍–‍861‍–‍18	Dodgers lose 1974 World Series
1975	Cardinals	7‍–‍5	Tie, 3‍–‍3	Cardinals, 4‍–‍2	Cardinals; 888‍–‍866‍–‍18	
1976	Dodgers	10‍–‍2	Dodgers, 4‍–‍2	Dodgers, 6‍–‍0	Cardinals; 890‍–‍876‍–‍18	
1977	Tie	6‍–‍6	Cardinals, 5‍–‍1	Dodgers, 5‍–‍1	Cardinals; 896‍–‍882‍–‍18	Dodgers lose 1977 World Series
1978	Cardinals	7‍–‍5	Cardinals, 4‍–‍2	Tie, 3‍–‍3	Cardinals; 903‍–‍887‍–‍18	Dodgers lose 1978 World Series
1979	Tie	6‍–‍6	Tie, 3‍–‍3	Tie, 3‍–‍3	Cardinals; 909‍–‍893‍–‍18	

1980s (Dodgers, 64–60)

Season	Season series		at St. Louis Cardinals	at Los Angeles Dodgers	Overall series	Notes
1980	Dodgers	7‍–‍5	Cardinals, 4‍–‍2	Dodgers, 5‍–‍1	Cardinals; 914‍–‍900‍–‍18	
1981	Tie	5‍–‍5	Tie, 3‍–‍3	Tie, 2‍–‍2	Cardinals; 919‍–‍905‍–‍18	Strike-shortened season. Dodgers win 1981 World Series
1982	Dodgers	7‍–‍5	Dodgers, 4‍–‍2	Tie, 3‍–‍3	Cardinals; 924‍–‍912‍–‍18	Cardinals win 1982 World Series
1983	Dodgers	9‍–‍3	Dodgers, 4‍–‍2	Dodgers, 5‍–‍1	Cardinals; 927‍–‍921‍–‍18	
1984	Tie	6‍–‍6	Tie, 3‍–‍3	Tie, 3‍–‍3	Cardinals; 933‍–‍927‍–‍18	
1985	Dodgers	7‍–‍5	Tie, 3‍–‍3	Dodgers, 4‍–‍2	Cardinals; 938‍–‍934‍–‍18	Cardinals lose 1985 World Series
1985 NLCS	Cardinals	4‍–‍2	3‍–‍0	Dodgers, 2‍–‍1	Cardinals; 942‍–‍936‍–‍18	
1986	Dodgers	8‍–‍4	Dodgers, 4‍–‍2	Dodgers, 4‍–‍2	Cardinals; 946‍–‍944‍–‍18	
1987	Cardinals	9‍–‍3	Cardinals, 5‍–‍1	Cardinals, 4‍–‍2	Cardinals; 955‍–‍947‍–‍18	On May 10, the Dodgers come one game from ending the Cardinals' 53-season series lead (948–947–18), though are unable to overcome it. The Cardinals' series lead remains to this day. Cardinals lose 1987 World Series
1988	Dodgers	7‍–‍5	Tie, 3‍–‍3	Dodgers, 4‍–‍2	Cardinals; 960‍–‍954‍–‍18	Dodgers win 1988 World Series
1989	Cardinals	9‍–‍3	Cardinals, 6‍–‍0	Tie, 3‍–‍3	Cardinals; 969‍–‍957‍–‍18	

1990s (Cardinals, 55–52)

Season	Season series		at St. Louis Cardinals	at Los Angeles Dodgers	Overall series	Notes
1990	Dodgers	7‍–‍5	Dodgers, 5‍–‍1	Cardinals, 4‍–‍2	Cardinals; 974‍–‍964‍–‍18	
1991	Tie	6‍–‍6	Cardinals, 4‍–‍2	Dodgers, 4‍–‍2	Cardinals; 980‍–‍970‍–‍18	
1992	Cardinals	8‍–‍4	Cardinals, 4‍–‍2	Cardinals, 4‍–‍2	Cardinals; 988‍–‍974‍–‍18	
1993	Tie	6‍–‍6	Dodgers, 5‍–‍1	Cardinals, 5‍–‍1	Cardinals; 994‍–‍980‍–‍18	
1994	Cardinals	4‍–‍2	Cardinals, 2‍–‍1	Cardinals, 2‍–‍1	Cardinals; 998‍–‍982‍–‍18	MLB realignment shifts Cardinals into NL Central. Dodgers remain in the NL West. Strike-shortened season. Strike cancel postseason
1995	Dodgers	7‍–‍5	Dodgers, 4‍–‍2	Tie, 3‍–‍3	Cardinals; 1,003‍–‍989‍–‍18	Strike-shortened season
1996	Dodgers	8‍–‍4	Dodgers, 4‍–‍2	Dodgers, 4‍–‍2	Cardinals; 1,007‍–‍997‍–‍18	
1997	Cardinals	6‍–‍5	Tie, 3‍–‍3	Cardinals, 3‍–‍2	Cardinals; 1,013‍–‍1,002‍–‍18	
1998	Cardinals	5‍–‍4	Cardinals, 4‍–‍2	Dodgers, 2‍–‍1	Cardinals; 1,018‍–‍1,006‍–‍18	
1999	Cardinals	6‍–‍3	Cardinals, 2‍–‍1	Cardinals, 4‍–‍2	Cardinals; 1,024‍–‍1,009‍–‍18	

2000s (Cardinals, 46–27)

Season	Season series		at St. Louis Cardinals	at Los Angeles Dodgers	Overall series	Notes
2000	Cardinals	6‍–‍3	Cardinals, 4‍–‍2	Cardinals, 2‍–‍1	Cardinals; 1,030‍–‍1,012‍–‍18	
2001	Tie	3‍–‍3	Cardinals, 2‍–‍1	Dodgers, 2‍–‍1	Cardinals; 1,033‍–‍1,015‍–‍18	
2002	Cardinals	4‍–‍2	Tie, 2‍–‍2	Cardinals, 2‍–‍0	Cardinals; 1,037‍–‍1,017‍–‍18	
2003	Dodgers	4‍–‍2	Dodgers, 2‍–‍0	Tie, 2‍–‍2	Cardinals; 1,039‍–‍1,021‍–‍18	
2004	Cardinals	4‍–‍2	Cardinals, 3‍–‍0	Dodgers, 2‍–‍1	Cardinals; 1,043‍–‍1,023‍–‍18	
2004 NLDS	Cardinals	3‍–‍1	Cardinals, 2‍–‍0	Tie, 1‍–‍1	Cardinals; 1,046‍–‍1,024‍–‍18	Cardinals lose 2004 World Series.
2005	Cardinals	5‍–‍2	Cardinals, 3‍–‍1	Cardinals, 2‍–‍1	Cardinals; 1,051‍–‍1,026‍–‍18	
2006	Cardinals	7‍–‍0	Cardinals, 4‍–‍0	Cardinals, 3‍–‍0	Cardinals; 1,058‍–‍1,026‍–‍18	Cardinals open Busch Stadium, win 2006 World Series
2007	Tie	3‍–‍3	Cardinals, 2‍–‍1	Dodgers, 2‍–‍1	Cardinals; 1,061‍–‍1,029‍–‍18	
2008	Cardinals	4‍–‍2	Cardinals, 2‍–‍1	Cardinals, 2‍–‍1	Cardinals; 1,065‍–‍1,031‍–‍18	
2009	Cardinals	5‍–‍2	Cardinals, 3‍–‍1	Cardinals, 2‍–‍1	Cardinals; 1,070‍–‍1,033‍–‍18	
2009 NLDS	Dodgers	3‍–‍0	Dodgers, 1‍–‍0	Dodgers, 2‍–‍0	Cardinals; 1,070‍–‍1,036‍–‍18	

2010s (Cardinals, 43–40)

Season	Season series		at St. Louis Cardinals	at Los Angeles Dodgers	Overall series	Notes
2010	Cardinals	4‍–‍3	Cardinals, 4‍–‍0	Dodgers, 3‍–‍0	Cardinals; 1,074‍–‍1,039‍–‍18	
2011	Dodgers	4‍–‍3	Dodgers, 3‍–‍0	Cardinals, 3‍–‍1	Cardinals; 1,077‍–‍1,043‍–‍18	Cardinals win 2011 World Series
2012	Dodgers	6‍–‍5	Cardinals, 3‍–‍1	Dodgers, 5‍–‍2	Cardinals; 1,082‍–‍1,049‍–‍18	
2013	Dodgers	4‍–‍3	Dodgers, 3‍–‍1	Cardinals, 2‍–‍1	Cardinals; 1,085‍–‍1,053‍–‍18	
2013 NLCS	Cardinals	4‍–‍2	Cardinals, 3‍–‍0	Dodgers, 2‍–‍1	Cardinals; 1,089‍–‍1,055‍–‍18	Cardinals lose 2013 World Series
2014	Dodgers	4‍–‍3	Cardinals, 2‍–‍1	Dodgers, 3‍–‍1	Cardinals; 1,092‍–‍1,059‍–‍18	
2014 NLDS	Cardinals	3‍–‍1	Cardinals, 2‍–‍0	Tie, 1‍–‍1	Cardinals; 1,095‍–‍1,060‍–‍18	
2015	Cardinals	5‍–‍2	Cardinals, 2‍–‍1	Cardinals, 3‍–‍1	Cardinals; 1,100‍–‍1,062‍–‍18	
2016	Dodgers	4‍–‍2	Dodgers, 2‍–‍1	Dodgers, 2‍–‍1	Cardinals; 1,102‍–‍1,066‍–‍18	
2017	Dodgers	4‍–‍3	Tie, 2‍–‍2	Dodgers, 2‍–‍1	Cardinals; 1,105‍–‍1,070‍–‍18	Dodgers lose 2017 World Series
2018	Cardinals	4‍–‍3	Dodgers, 3‍–‍1	Cardinals, 3‍–‍0	Cardinals; 1,109‍–‍1,073‍–‍18	Dodgers lose 2018 World Series
2019	Cardinals	4‍–‍3	Cardinals, 4‍–‍0	Dodgers, 3‍–‍0	Cardinals; 1,113‍–‍1,076‍–‍18	

2020s (Dodgers, 22–18)

Season	Season series		at St. Louis Cardinals	at Los Angeles Dodgers	Overall series	Notes
2021	Dodgers	4‍–‍3	Tie, 2‍–‍2	Dodgers, 2‍–‍1	Cardinals; 1,116‍–‍1,080‍–‍18	
2021 NLWC	Dodgers	1‍–‍0	No games	Dodgers, 1‍–‍0	Cardinals; 1,116‍–‍1,081‍–‍18	
2022	Dodgers	4‍–‍2	Dodgers, 2‍–‍1	Dodgers, 2‍–‍1	Cardinals; 1,118‍–‍1,085‍–‍18	
2023	Dodgers	4‍–‍3	Cardinals, 3‍–‍1	Dodgers, 3‍–‍0	Cardinals; 1,121‍–‍1,089‍–‍18	
2024	Dodgers	5‍–‍2	Dodgers, 2‍–‍1	Dodgers, 3‍–‍1	Cardinals; 1,123‍–‍1,094‍–‍18	Dodgers win 2024 World Series
2025	Cardinals	4‍–‍2	Cardinals, 2‍–‍1	Cardinals, 2‍–‍1	Cardinals; 1,127‍–‍1,096‍–‍18	Dodgers win 2025 World Series
2026	Cardinals	4‍–‍2	Cardinals, 2‍–‍1	Cardinals, 2‍–‍1	Cardinals; 1,131‍–‍1,098‍–‍18	

Summary of Results

Season	Season series		at St. Louis Cardinals	at Brooklyn/Los Angeles Dodgers	Notes
St. Louis Cardinals vs Brooklyn Dodgers	Cardinals	744‍–‍712‍–‍18	Cardinals, 419‍–‍311‍–‍8	Dodgers, 401‍–‍325‍–‍10	
St. Louis Cardinals vs Los Angeles Dodgers	Cardinals	387‍–‍386	Cardinals, 210‍–‍180	Dodgers, 206‍–‍177	
Regular season games	Cardinals	1117‍–‍1088‍–‍18	Cardinals, 619‍–‍490‍–‍8	Dodgers, 598‍–‍498‍–‍10	
Postseason games	Cardinals	14‍–‍10	Cardinals, 10‍–‍1	Dodgers, 9‍–‍4	
Postseason series	Cardinals	4‍–‍2	Cardinals, 4‍–‍0‍–‍1	Dodgers, 4‍–‍0‍–‍2	NLWC: 2021; NLDS: 2004, 2009, 2014; NLCS: 1985, 2013
Overall Regular season and postseason	Cardinals	1,131‍–‍1,098‍–‍18	Cardinals, 629‍–‍491‍–‍8	Dodgers, 607‍–‍502‍–‍10	
