= 2009 National League Division Series =

American baseball games

Teams
Team (Wins)		Manager	Season
Los Angeles Dodgers (3)		Joe Torre	95–67 (.586), GA: 3
St. Louis Cardinals (0)		Tony La Russa	91–71 (.562), GA: 7 1/2
- Dates: October 7–10
- Television: TBS
- TV announcers: Dick Stockton, Bob Brenly, and Tom Verducci
- Radio: ESPN
- Radio announcers: Jon Sciambi and Aaron Boone
- Umpires: Dana DeMuth, Brian O'Nora, Mike Everitt, Jeff Nelson, Ed Rapuano, Tony Randazzo

Teams
Team (Wins)		Manager	Season
Philadelphia Phillies (3)		Charlie Manuel	93–69 (.574), GA: 6
Colorado Rockies (1)		Jim Tracy	92–70 (.568), GB: 3
- Dates: October 7–12
- Television: TBS
- TV announcers: Brian Anderson, Joe Simpson, and David Aldridge
- Radio: ESPN
- Radio announcers: Chris Berman and Rick Sutcliffe (in Philadelphia); Gary Thorne and Chris Singleton (in Denver)
- Umpires: Gerry Davis, Bob Davidson, Jerry Meals, Ron Kulpa, Angel Hernandez, Tim Timmons

The 2009 National League Division Series (NLDS) consisted of two best-of-five playoff series on the National League side in Major League Baseball’s 2009 postseason that determined the participating teams in the 2009 National League Championship Series. Three divisional winners and a "wild card" team played in the two series. The NLDS began on Wednesday, October 7 and ended on Monday, October 12. TBS televised all games in the United States.

Under MLB's playoff format, no two teams from the same division were matched up in the Division Series, regardless of whether their records would normally indicate such a matchup. Home field advantage went to the team with the better regular-season record with the exception of the wild card team, which defers home field advantage regardless of record. The matchups were:

- (1) Los Angeles Dodgers (NL West champions) vs. (3) St. Louis Cardinals (NL Central champions): Dodgers won the series, 3–0.
- (2) Philadelphia Phillies (NL East champions) vs. (4) Colorado Rockies (Wild Card qualifier): Phillies won the series, 3–1.

This marked the second postseason meeting between the Phillies and Rockies in three seasons; the Rockies swept the Phillies in the 2007 NLDS. The Dodgers and Cardinals last met in the postseason during the 2004 NLDS, which the Cardinals won 3–1.

The Dodgers and Phillies won their respective series—the Dodgers three games to none and the Phillies three games to one. The Phillies defeated the Dodgers in the NLCS by a series score of 4–1 for the second consecutive year, and lost the 2009 World Series to the American League champion New York Yankees, 4–2.

== Matchups ==
=== Los Angeles Dodgers vs. St. Louis Cardinals ===
Los Angeles won the series, 3–0.

Game	Date	Score	Location	Time	Attendance
1	October 7	St. Louis Cardinals – 3, Los Angeles Dodgers – 5	Dodger Stadium	3:54	56,000
2	October 8	St. Louis Cardinals – 2, Los Angeles Dodgers – 3	Dodger Stadium	3:07	51,819
3	October 10	Los Angeles Dodgers – 5, St. Louis Cardinals – 1	Busch Stadium	3:02	47,296

=== Philadelphia Phillies vs. Colorado Rockies ===
Philadelphia won the series, 3–1.

Game	Date	Score	Location	Time	Attendance
1	October 7	Colorado Rockies – 1, Philadelphia Phillies – 5	Citizens Bank Park	2:48	46,452
2	October 8	Colorado Rockies – 5, Philadelphia Phillies – 4	Citizens Bank Park	3:41	46,528
3	October 11	Philadelphia Phillies – 6, Colorado Rockies – 5	Coors Field	4:06	50,109
4	October 12	Philadelphia Phillies – 5, Colorado Rockies – 4	Coors Field	3:41	49,940

== Los Angeles vs. St. Louis ==
=== Game 1 ===
October 7, 2009 6:37 pm (PDT) at Dodger Stadium in Los Angeles, California 62 °F (17 °C), mostly clear
Team	1	2	3	4	5	6	7	8	9	R	H	E
St. Louis	1	0	0	1	0	0	0	0	1	3	11	0
Los Angeles	2	0	1	0	1	1	0	0	X	5	12	0
WP: Jeff Weaver (1–0) LP: Chris Carpenter (0–1) Sv: Jonathan Broxton (1); Home runs: STL: None; LAD: Matt Kemp (1); Attendance: 56,000; Boxscore

Neither team's starting pitcher was particularly effective in the series opener; however, neither team's offense was able to capitalize, as this game set an MLB postseason record for runners left on base combined between the two teams, with 30. Los Angeles starter Randy Wolf loaded the bases with no outs in the first inning, but allowed just one run on Ryan Ludwick's one-out single. In the bottom half of the inning, St. Louis starter Chris Carpenter gave up a two-run home run to Matt Kemp, giving the Dodgers a lead they would never relinquish. In the third, they put runners on first and second on a walk and hit-by-pitch before Casey Blake's RBI single put them up 3–1. The Cardinals cut the lead back to one in the fourth when Colby Rasmus drew a leadoff walk, moved to second on a groundout and scored on Skip Schumaker's double. In the fifth, Rafael Furcal's sacrifice fly with runners on second and third made it 4–2 Dodgers. Next inning, Kyle McClellan hit Russell Martin with a pitch with the bases loaded to force in another run, charged to Dennys Reyes, for the Dodgers. In the top of the ninth, Jonathan Broxton allowed a one-out single to Ryan Ludwick, who scored on Mark DeRosa's two-out double, before striking out Rick Ankiel looking to end the game and give the Dodgers a 1–0 series lead.

Los Angeles slugger Manny Ramirez was held to 1-for-4 with one walk, while St. Louis slugger Albert Pujols was 0-for-3 with two intentional walks. The game ran 3:54 which made it the longest nine-inning postseason game in history: however, the record was broken four days later by the Rockies and Phillies.

=== Game 2 ===
October 8, 2009 3:07 pm (PDT) at Dodger Stadium in Los Angeles, California 66 °F (19 °C), mostly clear
Team	1	2	3	4	5	6	7	8	9	R	H	E
St. Louis	0	1	0	0	0	0	1	0	0	2	10	1
Los Angeles	0	0	0	1	0	0	0	0	2	3	5	0
WP: George Sherrill (1–0) LP: Ryan Franklin (0–1); Home runs: STL: Matt Holliday (1); LAD: Andre Ethier (1); Attendance: 51,819; Boxscore

In an amazing pitching duel, Game 2 was dominated by Cardinals pitcher Adam Wainwright and Dodgers phenom Clayton Kershaw, who was pitching in his first career postseason start. In the second inning, Matt Holliday hit a home run to put the Cardinals ahead 1–0, but Dodger slugger Andre Ethier hit his first career post-season homer to tie it up 1–1 in the bottom of the fourth, the first hit Wainwright allowed. Wainwright dominated throughout his start, retiring the first 11 hitters he faced, while Kershaw kept pitching in and out of trouble. In the seventh inning, a double by Colby Rasmus with no outs scored Mark DeRosa to put St. Louis ahead 2–1, but Rasmus was thrown out at third base, which ended up being a huge play. At the time, it seemed to be enough to allow Wainwright to pitch to victory; in the eighth inning, however, he pitched into a bases-loaded jam. With two outs, Game 1 hero Matt Kemp grounded out to Albert Pujols to end the threat, and going into the ninth inning, Cardinal closer Ryan Franklin was brought in with one out. After retiring Manny Ramirez, Dodger first baseman James Loney hit a fly ball to Holliday, who lost the ball in the lights and it hit off his belly, allowing Loney to reach second on the error. After a walk to Casey Blake, mid-season acquisition Ronnie Belliard hit a clutch two-out single to score pinch runner Juan Pierre to tie the game, and after Russell Martin walked to load the bases, veteran pinch hitter Mark Loretta, who was 0-for-15 career against Franklin, hit a walk-off single to center field to score Blake and the Dodgers won the game in dramatic fashion, spoiling the gem by Wainwright and sending the series to St. Louis with a 2–0 LA advantage.

=== Game 3 ===
October 10, 2009 5:07 pm (CDT) at Busch Stadium in St. Louis, Missouri 55 °F (13 °C), partly cloudy
Team	1	2	3	4	5	6	7	8	9	R	H	E
Los Angeles	1	0	2	1	0	0	1	0	0	5	12	0
St. Louis	0	0	0	0	0	0	0	1	0	1	6	1
WP: Vicente Padilla (1–0) LP: Joel Piñeiro (0–1); Home runs: LAD: Andre Ethier (2); STL: None; Attendance: 47,296; Boxscore

The Dodgers swept the Cardinals 3–0, and went on to go face the Phillies in a NLCS rematch. Vicente Padilla silenced the Cardinals' bats again by pitching dominantly, allowing no runs on four hits through seven innings. The 47,296 attendance was the largest crowd to see a game at Busch Stadium since it opened in 2006. In the top of the first, Matt Kemp singled with one out off Joel Piñeiro and scored on Manny Ramirez's two-out double. In the third, Andre Ethier's two-run home run made it 3–0 Dodgers. Next inning, Ronnie Belliard hit a leadoff single, moved to second on a groundout, and scored on Rafael Furcal's two-out single. In the seventh, Ethier tripled with two outs off John Smoltz and scored on Ramirez's single. The Cardinals scored their only run of the game in the eighth when Julio Lugo walked off George Sherrill, stole second and scored on Albert Pujols's single off Jonathan Broxton. Broxton pitched a scoreless ninth to seal the series for the Dodgers.

=== Composite line score ===
2009 NLDS (3–0): Los Angeles Dodgers over St. Louis Cardinals

Team	1	2	3	4	5	6	7	8	9	R	H	E
Los Angeles Dodgers	3	0	3	2	1	1	1	0	2	13	29	0
St. Louis Cardinals	1	1	0	1	0	0	1	1	1	6	27	2
Total attendance: 155,115 Average attendance: 51,705

== Philadelphia vs. Colorado ==
=== Game 1 ===
October 7, 2009 2:37 pm (EDT) at Citizens Bank Park in Philadelphia, Pennsylvania 69 °F (21 °C), partly cloudy
Team	1	2	3	4	5	6	7	8	9	R	H	E
Colorado	0	0	0	0	0	0	0	0	1	1	6	1
Philadelphia	0	0	0	0	2	3	0	0	X	5	12	0
WP: Cliff Lee (1–0) LP: Ubaldo Jiménez (0–1); Attendance: 46,452; Boxscore

Amidst strong, swirling winds at Citizens Bank Park, the Phillies cruised to a 5–1 victory behind a dominating performance from Cliff Lee. Philadelphia broke a scoreless tie in the bottom of the fifth when Jayson Werth drew a leadoff walk and scored on an RBI double by Raúl Ibañez, who scored two batters later on a single from Carlos Ruiz. Rockies starter Ubaldo Jiménez ran into more trouble in the sixth, giving up a leadoff single to Chase Utley, who stole second, then an RBI double to Jayson Werth and an RBI triple to Ryan Howard. Joe Beimel relieved Jimenez and allowed an RBI single to Ibanez. Lee, meanwhile, retired 16 straight Colorado batters from the second inning into the seventh, picking up the complete game win in his first career postseason start. Lee was one strike away from completing a shutout, but Troy Tulowitzki lined a two-out, two-strike double in the top of the ninth to score Carlos Gonzalez from first to plate the Rockies' only run.

Actor Kevin Bacon and his brother Michael sang the national anthem before the game.

=== Game 2 ===
October 8, 2009 2:37 pm (EDT) at Citizens Bank Park in Philadelphia, Pennsylvania 65 °F (18 °C), partly cloudy
Team	1	2	3	4	5	6	7	8	9	R	H	E
Colorado	1	0	0	2	1	0	1	0	0	5	9	1
Philadelphia	0	0	0	0	0	3	0	1	0	4	11	0
WP: Aaron Cook (1–0) LP: Cole Hamels (0–1) Sv: Huston Street (1); Home runs: COL: Yorvit Torrealba (1); PHI: Jayson Werth (1); Attendance: 46,528; Boxscore

2008 NLCS and World Series MVP Cole Hamels faced Rockies' starter Aaron Cook in Game 2. In the top of the first inning, the Rockies scored the first run of the game when Todd Helton hit a ball up the first base line that was misplayed by Hamels allowing Carlos Gonzalez to score from third. Rockies' catcher Yorvit Torrealba then hit a two-run home run off Hamels in the fourth inning after he had not hit a home run since May 6. In the next inning, Dexter Fowler's sacrifice fly with runners on second and third made it 4–0 Rockies. Hamels was then told his wife, who was 9 months pregnant, was going into labor and he was lifted for a pinch-hitter in the bottom of the fifth inning. The Phillies would then fight back in the sixth inning. After consecutive hits by Shane Victorino and Chase Utley put runners on first and second with nobody out, Ryan Howard hit a line-drive double into the right field corner making the score 4–1. Jose Contreras relieved Cook as Raúl Ibañez hit a one-out single to center field scoring two runs to cut the score to 4–3. Pedro Feliz's single then loaded the bases, but Carlos Ruiz grounded into a double play, ending the threat. Charlie Manuel would use potential Game 3 starters Joe Blanton and J.A. Happ in the seventh inning, with Happ only throwing four pitches and leaving with an injury after being hit on the leg by a ball. The Rockies loaded the bases before Fowler's sacrifice fly off Scott Eyre made it 5–3 Rockies. Jayson Werth hit a home run in the eighth inning off Rafael Betancourt to once again close the Rockies lead to 1, but Huston Street retired Shane Victorino with two runners on base with two outs in the ninth inning to send the series to Colorado tied 1–1.

=== Game 3 ===
October 11, 2009 8:07 pm (MDT) at Coors Field in Denver, Colorado 35 °F (2 °C), partly clear
Team	1	2	3	4	5	6	7	8	9	R	H	E
Philadelphia	1	0	0	3	0	1	0	0	1	6	8	0
Colorado	2	0	1	1	0	0	1	0	0	5	10	0
WP: Chad Durbin (1–0) LP: Huston Street (0–1) Sv: Brad Lidge (1); Home runs: PHI: Chase Utley (1); COL: Carlos González (1); Attendance: 50,109; Boxscore

Game 3 was originally scheduled for October 10 at 9:37 p.m. Eastern, but was postponed due to snowy weather in the Denver area. The city received two inches of snow by Saturday morning, and forecasts called for a game-time temperature of 26 °F (−3 °C). The October 10 low was 17 °F (−8 °C), breaking a record set in 1905. This normally would not have been a problem due to Coors Field's underground heating system, and the Rockies have played in freezing conditions before. However, MLB began giving serious thought to postponing the game after hearing that the temperature would barely make it above freezing, and reports of icy roads and numerous accidents clinched the decision. This pushed Game 4 back to October 12, with Game 5, if necessary, to be played the next day in Philadelphia with no travel day.

The temperature at game time (10:07 pm Eastern; 8:07 pm local) was 35 °F (2 °C) and it dropped over the course of the game, which ended after midnight local time. At 4:06, this was the longest nine-inning postseason game ever (breaking a record set four days earlier by the Dodgers and Cardinals.)

Chase Utley's two-out home run off Jason Hammel made it 1–0 Phillies in the first, but in the bottom half, Todd Helton's RBI groundout after back-to-back leadoff singles off J. A. Happ tied the score. After a single and strikeout, Garrett Atkins's RBI single put the Rockies up 2–1. In the third, Helton drew a leadoff walk and scored on Atkins's double to make it 3–1 Rockies, but in the fourth, a leadoff walk and single was followed by Ryan Howard's RBI single. Hammel then walked two to load the bases and force in another run to tie the game. After a double play, Carlos Ruiz's RBI single put the Phillies up 4–3, but Carlos Gonzalez's home run in the bottom of the inning off Joe Blanton tied the game. In the sixth, back-to-back one-out walks off Jose Contreras were followed by Ruiz's RBI single that put the Phillies up 5–4. In the bottom of the seventh, Scott Eyre allowed a leadoff double and subsequent single before being relieved by Ryan Madson, who allowed a one-out sacrifice fly to Troy Tulowitzki to tie the game. In the ninth, Ryan Howard's sacrifice fly with two on off Huston Street put the Phillies up 6–5. Brad Lidge pitched a scoreless bottom half despite allowing two walks to give the Phillies a 2–1 series lead.

=== Game 4 ===
October 12, 2009 4:07 pm (MDT) at Coors Field in Denver, Colorado 47 °F (8 °C), mostly cloudy
Team	1	2	3	4	5	6	7	8	9	R	H	E
Philadelphia	1	0	0	0	0	1	0	0	3	5	9	2
Colorado	0	0	0	0	0	1	0	3	0	4	9	0
WP: Ryan Madson (1–0) LP: Huston Street (0–2) Sv: Brad Lidge (2); Home runs: PHI: Shane Victorino (1), Jayson Werth (2); COL: None; Attendance: 49,940; Boxscore

Game 4 was originally scheduled to start on Game 3's date and start time, but due to the Saturday postponement was pushed back to Monday with first pitch at 4:07 Mountain Time.

With an extra day of rest, both teams pitched their aces in a rematch of Game 1. The Phillies quickly struck in the first, as the second batter of the game, Shane Victorino, hit a home run into the Rockies bullpen. Jimenez would settle down, virtually matching the Phillies' Cliff Lee the rest of the way, his only other run coming on a Jayson Werth homer in the sixth. Lee wasn't as dominant as he was in Game 1, but held the Rockies at bay until the sixth when he walked Todd Helton on four pitches and Troy Tulowitzki doubled him home to cut the lead to 2–1. He got out of it by getting Garrett Atkins to line out to third, and Tulowitzki was doubled off second.

Jimenez pitched seven innings before giving way to Franklin Morales. The Phillies would load the bases in the eighth with one out off Morales, but Rafael Betancourt would get a pop out and strikeout to keep Philadelphia from adding to their lead. With one out in the bottom of the inning, Lee walked Dexter Fowler. Helton then bounced what looked like a tailor-made double play ground ball to Chase Utley. Fowler, to avoid running into him, jumped and hurdled over Utley, whose throw to second was wide and an error. Lee was pulled and a double switch was made, Ryan Madson in to pitch, Ben Francisco in left field. Tulowitzki promptly stepped up and hit a shallow fly to left that Francisco made a diving catch on to rob the Rockies of the potential tying run. Jason Giambi pinch hit, and on the first pitch punched a game-tying single to left. Yorvit Torrealba followed by hitting a two-run double over the head of Victorino, giving the Rockies their first lead. Madson then intentionally walked Seth Smith and threw a wild pitch to advance both runners, but got Clint Barmes to ground out to end the inning.

In the ninth Colorado again turned to Street, the losing pitcher in Game 3 to send the series back to Philadelphia for a Game 5. This time he opened the inning by striking out pinch hitter Greg Dobbs, prompting Ryan Howard to tell his teammates to "get me to the plate, boys." Jimmy Rollins, though, as he did the previous night, singled. After Victorino bounced into a fielder's choice that saw Rollins forced out at second, Utley stepped up and went down 2–2 in the count. He would, however, work a walk to bring go-ahead run Ryan Howard to the plate. On a 2–1 pitch, Howard belted a double to the wall in right field, tying the game. Werth followed with a bloop single to shallow right on a 2–2 pitch as the Phillies matched the Rockies' three-run rally with one of their own to retake the lead.

Colorado would threaten again in the ninth against Scott Eyre. With one out, Carlos Gonzalez singled, tying him with Dante Bichette for the club record for hits in the Division Series at ten. Following a Fowler lineout, Helton singled up middle. Brad Lidge was again summoned from the bullpen and faced Tulowitzki in a rematch of the previous night's final at-bat. Having looked at two sliders, and barely checked his swing on another, Lidge threw Tulowitzki a 2–2 slider. This time Tulowitzki could not check his swing, striking out to end the game, and sending the Phillies to the NLCS with a three-games-to-one series victory. It also marked the first time in Division Series history that all four series winners clinched on the road, as the Dodgers, Angels and Yankees all had completed sweeps on the road previously.

=== Composite line score ===
2009 NLDS (3–1): Philadelphia Phillies over Colorado Rockies

Team	1	2	3	4	5	6	7	8	9	R	H	E
Philadelphia Phillies	2	0	0	3	2	8	0	1	4	20	40	2
Colorado Rockies	3	0	1	3	1	1	2	3	1	15	34	2
Total attendance: 193,029 Average attendance: 48,257

== See also ==
- 2009 American League Division Series
