= Shane Robinson (baseball) =

American baseball player (born 1984)

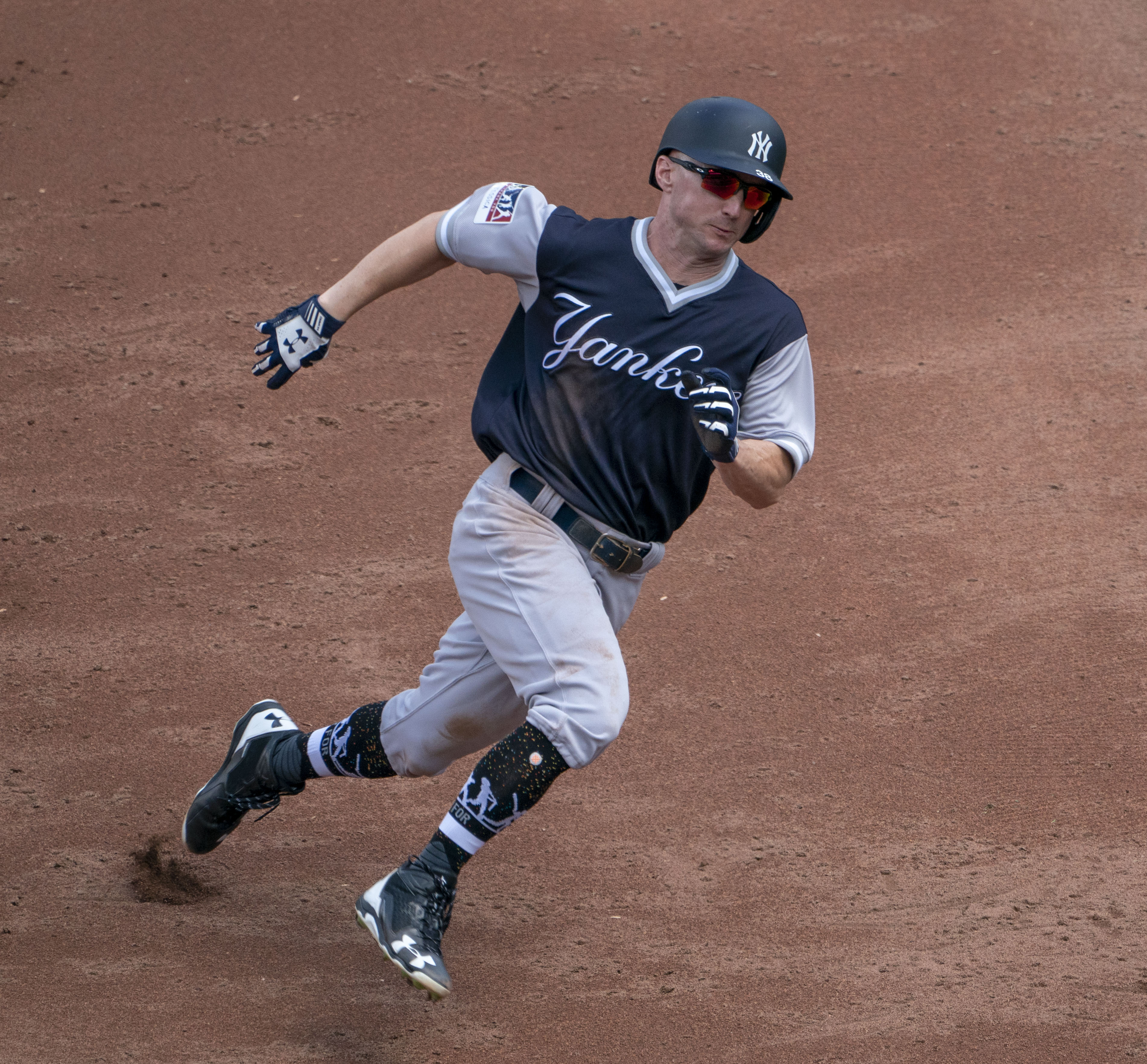
- Robinson with the New York Yankees

San Francisco Giants – No. 82
- Outfielder / Coach
- Born: October 30, 1984 (age 42); Tampa, Florida, U.S.
- Batted: Right Threw: Right

MLB debut
- May 7, 2009, for the St. Louis Cardinals

Last MLB appearance
- August 31, 2018, for the New York Yankees

MLB statistics
- Batting average: .221
- Home runs: 7
- Runs batted in: 66
- Stats at Baseball Reference

Teams
- As player: St. Louis Cardinals (2009, 2011–2014); Minnesota Twins (2015); Los Angeles Angels (2016–2017); New York Yankees (2018); As coach: San Francisco Giants (2026–present)

Shane Michael Robinson (born October 30, 1984) is an American former professional baseball outfielder and current first base coach for the San Francisco Giants of Major League Baseball (MLB). He played in MLB for the St. Louis Cardinals, Minnesota Twins, Los Angeles Angels, and New York Yankees between 2009 and 2018.

== High school and college career ==
Robinson graduated from Jesuit High School in Tampa, Florida. He lettered in baseball and football there, and was All-State in both sports in his junior and senior seasons.

Robinson then enrolled at Florida State University. Robinson started all 68 games for the Florida State Seminoles in center field as a freshman, while batting .280. After the 2004 season, he played collegiate summer baseball with the Hyannis Mets of the Cape Cod Baseball League and was named a league all-star. As a sophomore, he led the team with a .427 batting average, 96 runs (leading the NCAA), 122 hits, 25 doubles, .605 slugging %, .532 on base % and 49 stolen bases. He also set a school record by having a 40-game hitting streak, the 11th-longest in NCAA history. His breakout effort earned him the 2005 Collegiate Baseball National Player of the Year, the first Seminole to win the award since J. D. Drew in 1997. He was also named SEBaseball.com's ACC Player of the Year and was a candidate for every National Player of the Year honor. His numbers declined as a junior but he still put together a solid season, leading the Seminoles with a .361 average, 97 hits, 79 runs, and 32 stolen bases.

== Professional career ==
=== St. Louis Cardinals ===
Robinson was drafted by the Cardinals in the fifth round of the 2006 Major League Baseball draft out of Florida State University. He compiled a 21-game hitting streak from July 2–26, batting .372 (32-for-86) with a triple, three doubles, nine RBI, and 17 runs scored. He hit .286 and scored 36 runs in 48 games out of the leadoff spot.

In 2007, he began the season with High–A Palm Beach County in the Florida State League, and stole a career-high 14 bases and hit .364 (8-for-22) with a home run and six runs scored during a six-game hitting streak from April 10–15. Robinson batted .294 (15-for-51) with a .379 on-base percentage in 14 games in May before heading to the disabled list with a broken foot. On August 20 he began a rehab assignment with the Gulf Coast League Cardinals.

In 2008, Robinson hit .352 with four homers, 46 runs scored, 32 RBI, and 13 steals in 63 games with Double-A Springfield of the Texas League. He was Cardinals organizational Player of the Month for April, Texas League Player of the Week on May 12, and was a mid-season Texas League All Star. On June 22 he was promoted to Triple-A Memphis and finished the season hitting .220 with 10 RBI and 10 runs scored in 42 games.

On May 7, 2009, Robinson had his contract purchased from Memphis after Rick Ankiel was placed on the disabled list. He made his major league debut that day. Baseball America listed Robinson as the "Best Defensive Outfielder" in the Cardinals organization in its "Best Tools" survey.

In 2010, Baseball America again rated Robinson as the "Best Defensive Outfielder" in the Cardinals organization in its "Best Tools" survey.

In 2012, with the Cardinals Robinson batted .253/.309/.355 in 166 at-bats. He led all MLB rookies with 11 pinch hits, and was tied for 9th among all NL players. Playing for the Triple–A Memphis Redbirds he hit .300/.388/.414 with five stolen bases in five attempts, over 70 at-bats.

In 2013, Robinson batted .250/.345/.319 in 144 at-bats. Robinson played in 99 games, starting 30 (5 in left field, 21 in center field, and 4 in right field).

For the 2014 season with the Cardinals, he batted .150/.227/.200 in 60 at-bats. Playing for the Triple–A Memphis Redbirds, he batted .304/.380/.398 in 191 at-bats.

Robinson was released by the Cardinals on November 19, 2014.

=== Minnesota Twins ===
Robinson signed a minor league deal with the Minnesota Twins on December 5, 2014. He made the Twins roster as an outfielder, but on August 8, 2015 made his major league pitching debut in a 17-4 rout by Cleveland. In 2015 he batted .250/.299/.322 in a career-high 180 at bats.

=== Cleveland Indians ===
After electing free agency following the 2015 season, Robinson signed a minor-league contract with the Cleveland Indians on November 19, 2015. His contract included an invitation to the Indians' 2016 spring training. He was released on March 29, 2016.

=== Los Angeles Angels ===
Robinson was signed by the Los Angeles Angels to a minor league contract on March 31, 2016. He opened the season with the Triple-A Salt Lake Bees, but was recalled to the Angels on May 1. He spent the remainder of the season with the Angels but was designated for assignment when Andrew Bailey was signed to the major league roster following the season. After clearing waivers, he was reassigned to Salt Lake. Robinson refused the assignment and became a free agent on November 16. He returned to the Angels on a minor league contract one week later. For the 2016 season, he batted .173/.257/.235 with the Angels in 98 at bats.

Robinson attended 2017 major league spring training with the Angels, but was reassigned to their minor league camp on March 27. He had his contract purchased on July 19. Robinson was limited to just 20 games. For the 2017 season, he batted .194/.257/.194 with the Angels in 31 at bats. Playing in 2017 for the Triple–A Salt Lake Bees, he hit .319/.370/.425 in 348 at bats, stealing 15 bases in 16 attempts. He elected free agency after the season.

=== New York Yankees ===
On February 7, 2018, Robinson signed a minor-league contract with the New York Yankees with a $950,000 salary at the major league level and an invite to spring training. He was called up to the Yankees on April 10 and played in two games before being designated for assignment when Aaron Hicks was activated from the disabled list. On April 16 he was sent outright to the minors. He had his contract purchased again on July 26. He was designated for assignment on September 1. He was outrighted to the Triple–A Scranton/Wilkes-Barre RailRiders on September 3. For the season, with the Yankees he batted .143/.208/.224 in 49 at bats. Robinson declared free agency on October 10.

=== Philadelphia Phillies ===
On November 29, 2018, Robinson signed a minor-league contract with the Philadelphia Phillies. In 2019 with the Triple–A Lehigh Valley IronPigs he batted .288/.367/.389 with seven home runs and 31 RBI in 306 at-bats, as he stole eight bases in 11 attempts. Robinson elected free agency following the season on November 4, 2019.

=== Atlanta Braves ===
On January 22, 2020, the Atlanta Braves signed Robinson to a minor league contract with an invite to major league Spring Training. Robinson did not play in a game in 2020 due to the cancellation of the minor league season because of the COVID-19 pandemic. He became a free agent on November 2.

=== Acereros de Monclova ===
On July 8, 2021, Robinson signed with the Acereros de Monclova of the Mexican League. In 5 games for Monclova, he went 6-for-21 (.286)

== Post-playing career ==
On January 19, 2022, Robinson was hired by the San Diego Padres organization to serve as the bench coach for the San Antonio Missions, San Diego's Double-A affiliate.

On February 6, 2026, the San Francisco Giants hired Robinson as their first base coach.

== Personal life ==
Robinson and his wife, Jessica, have two daughters, Tinley and Harper. Robinson is a Christian.
