= 2011 Major League Baseball postseason =

2011 Major League Baseball playoffs

Tournament details
- Dates: September 30 – October 28, 2011
- Teams: 8

Final positions
- Champions: St. Louis Cardinals (11th title)
- Runners-up: Texas Rangers

Tournament statistics
- Most HRs: Nelson Cruz (TEX) (8)
- Most SBs: Willie Bloomquist (ARI) & Ian Kinsler (TEX) (3)
- Most Ks (as pitcher): C. J. Wilson (TEX) (26)

Awards
- MVP: David Freese (STL)

The 2011 Major League Baseball postseason was the playoff tournament of Major League Baseball for the 2011 season. The winners of the Division Series would move on to the League Championship Series to determine the pennant winners that face each other in the World Series. This was the last postseason to feature the 8-team format, as next season a new League Wild Card Game was introduced as the new opening round of the postseason, as well as the last time that two teams from the same division could not face each other in the opening round.

In the American League, the New York Yankees returned for the sixteenth time in the past seventeen years, the Texas Rangers returned for the second straight year, the Detroit Tigers returned for the first time since 2006, and was the first of four straight appearances by the Tigers. The Tampa Bay Rays returned for the third time in four years.

In the National League, the St. Louis Cardinals returned for the eighth time in the past twelve years, the Milwaukee Brewers made their second appearance in the past four years, the Philadelphia Phillies returned for the fifth straight time, and the Arizona Diamondbacks returned for the first time since 2007. This was Philadelphia’s last postseason appearance until 2022.

The postseason began on September 30, 2011, and ended on October 28, 2011, with the Cardinals defeating the Rangers in seven games in the 2011 World Series. It was the Cardinals' 11th title in franchise history.

== Playoff seeds ==
American League Teams National League Teams

The following teams qualified for the postseason:

=== American League ===
1. New York Yankees – 97–65, AL East champions
2. Texas Rangers – 96–66, AL West
3. Detroit Tigers – 95–67, AL Central champions
4. Tampa Bay Rays – 91–71

=== National League ===
1. Philadelphia Phillies – 102–60, NL East champions
2. Milwaukee Brewers – 96–66, NL Central champions
3. Arizona Diamondbacks – 94–68, NL West champions
4. St. Louis Cardinals – 90–72

== Playoff bracket ==
Division Series (ALDS, NLDS)
1	NY Yankees	2
3	Detroit	3
American League
2	Texas	3
4	Tampa Bay	1
1	Philadelphia	2
4	St. Louis	3
National League
2	Milwaukee	3
3	Arizona	2

League Championship Series (ALCS, NLCS)
3	Detroit	2
2	Texas	4
4	St. Louis	4
2	Milwaukee	2

World Series
AL2	Texas	3
NL4	St. Louis	4

Note: Two teams in the same division cannot meet in the division series.

== American League Division Series ==
=== (1) New York Yankees vs. (3) Detroit Tigers ===
Detroit won the series, 3–2.

Game	Date	Score	Location	Time	Attendance
1	September 30† / October 1	Detroit Tigers – 3, New York Yankees – 9	Yankee Stadium	3:26 (1:17 delay)	50,940
2	October 2	Detroit Tigers – 5, New York Yankees – 3	Yankee Stadium	3:34	50,596
3	October 3	New York Yankees – 4, Detroit Tigers – 5	Comerica Park	3:14	43,581
4	October 4	New York Yankees – 10, Detroit Tigers – 1	Comerica Park	3:10	43,527
5	October 6	Detroit Tigers – 3, New York Yankees – 2	Yankee Stadium	3:34	50,960

†: suspended in the bottom of the second inning due to rain

This was the second postseason meeting between the Tigers and Yankees. They previously met in the ALDS in 2006, which the Tigers won in four games before falling in the World Series. In a hotly contested five-game series, the Tigers once again defeated the Yankees to return to the ALCS for the second time in six years.

The Yankees unsurprisingly took Game 1 in a blowout win, as the Yankees' offense chased Doug Fister from the mound. In Game 2, the Tigers jumped out to a 4–0 lead and their bullpen stopped a late rally by the Yankees to even the series headed back to Detroit. Delmon Young would propel the Tigers to a one-run victory in Game 3 thanks to a solo home run in the bottom of the seventh that broke a 4–4 tie. Then, the Yankees would blow out the Tigers again in Game 4 to send the series back to the Bronx. However, in Game 5, Fister would redeem himself as he and the Tigers' bullpen fended off a late push by the Yankees to win 3–2 and return to the ALCS. Game 5 would ultimately be Mariano Rivera’s final postseason game, as he missed the 2012 postseason due to injury and would retire in 2013.

The Tigers became the third team to win consecutive postseason series against the Yankees, joining the 1921–22 New York Giants and the 2002 and 2005 Anaheim/Los Angeles Angels. Both teams would meet again in the ALCS the next year, which the Tigers won in a sweep before falling in the World Series.

=== (2) Texas Rangers vs. (4) Tampa Bay Rays ===
Texas won the series, 3–1.

Game	Date	Score	Location	Time	Attendance
1	September 30	Tampa Bay Rays – 9, Texas Rangers – 0	Rangers Ballpark in Arlington	3:00	50,498
2	October 1	Tampa Bay Rays – 6, Texas Rangers – 8	Rangers Ballpark in Arlington	3:28	51,351
3	October 3	Texas Rangers – 4, Tampa Bay Rays – 3	Tropicana Field	3:51	32,828
4	October 4	Texas Rangers – 4, Tampa Bay Rays – 3	Tropicana Field	3:05	28,299

This was the second straight postseason meeting between the Rays and Rangers, and a rematch of last year's ALDS. The Rangers once again defeated the Rays to advance to the ALCS for the second year in a row.

Rays' rookie pitcher Matt Moore pitched seven shutout innings as the Rays blew out the Rangers in Game 1. Game 2 was an offensive shootout which the Rangers won 8–6 to even the series headed to St. Petersburg. In the top of the seventh inning of Game 3, Mike Napoli and Josh Hamilton helped the Rangers come from behind to win by a 4–3 score to take the series lead. The Rangers would win the series in Game 4 thanks to a home run from Ian Kinsler and three more from Adrián Beltré.

Both teams would meet again in the Wild Card round in 2023, which the Rangers won in a sweep en route to a World Series title.

== National League Division Series ==
=== (1) Philadelphia Phillies vs. (4) St. Louis Cardinals ===
St. Louis won the series, 3–2.

Game	Date	Score	Location	Time	Attendance
1	October 1	St. Louis Cardinals – 6, Philadelphia Phillies – 11	Citizens Bank Park	2:55	46,480
2	October 2	St. Louis Cardinals – 5, Philadelphia Phillies – 4	Citizens Bank Park	3:22	46,575
3	October 4	Philadelphia Phillies – 3, St. Louis Cardinals – 2	Busch Stadium	3:13	46,914
4	October 5	Philadelphia Phillies – 3, St. Louis Cardinals – 5	Busch Stadium	2:34	47,071
5	October 7	St. Louis Cardinals – 1, Philadelphia Phillies – 0	Citizens Bank Park	2:29	46,530

This was the first postseason meeting between the Cardinals and Phillies. The Cardinals upset the heavily favored Phillies in five games to return to the NLCS for the fifth time in the last nine years.

Game 1 was an offensive slugfest that was won by the Phillies. In Game 2, the Phillies jumped out to a 4-0 lead after the second inning, but the Cardinals mounted a comeback, putting up five unanswered runs across innings four through seven to even the series heading to St. Louis, handing Cliff Lee his third straight postseason loss going back to the 2010 World Series. Cole Hamels pitched six shutout innings and Ryan Madson stopped a late Cardinals rally to earn a save and give the Phillies back the series lead. In Game 4, the Cardinals came from behind to win once again thanks to a two-run RBI double from David Freese in the bottom of the fourth to put the Cards in the lead for good, sending the series back to Philadelphia for a decisive fifth game. In Game 5, Chris Carpenter pitched a three-hit complete game shutout as the Cardinals won 1-0 to advance. The Cardinals’ 1-0 victory was the third winner-take-all game in postseason history to end in a 1-0 score (joining Game 7 of the 1962 World Series and 1991 World Series).

Both teams would meet again in the Wild Card round in 2022, where the Phillies returned the favor by sweeping the Cardinals before falling in the World Series that year.

=== (2) Milwaukee Brewers vs. (3) Arizona Diamondbacks ===
Milwaukee won the series, 3–2.

Game	Date	Score	Location	Time	Attendance
1	October 1	Arizona Diamondbacks – 1, Milwaukee Brewers – 4	Miller Park	2:44	44,122
2	October 2	Arizona Diamondbacks – 4, Milwaukee Brewers – 9	Miller Park	3:29	44,066
3	October 4	Milwaukee Brewers – 1, Arizona Diamondbacks – 8	Chase Field	3:01	48,312
4	October 5	Milwaukee Brewers – 6, Arizona Diamondbacks – 10	Chase Field	3:25	38,830
5	October 7	Arizona Diamondbacks – 2, Milwaukee Brewers – 3 (10)	Miller Park	3:41	44,028

This was the first postseason meeting between the Brewers and Diamondbacks. The Brewers defeated the Diamondbacks in five games to reach their first ever NLCS and first LCS overall since 1982.

Yovani Gallardo helped lead the Brewers to victory in Game 1 with a solid eight-inning performance. In Game 2, with the game tied at four, the Brewers scored five unanswered runs in the bottom of the sixth to win and go up 2–0 in the series headed to Phoenix. Josh Collmenter pitched seven solid innings as the Diamondbacks blew out the Brewers in Game 3. Game 4 was an offensive slugfest that was won by the Diamondbacks as they forced a decisive fifth game back in Milwaukee. In Game 5, the Diamondbacks tied the game in the top of the ninth to force extras, but the Brewers survived as Nyjer Morgan hit a walk-off RBI single in the bottom of the tenth. This was the first playoff series win by the Brewers since winning the American League pennant in 1982.

Both teams would meet again in the Wild Card round in 2023, which the Diamondbacks won in a sweep before falling in the World Series.

== American League Championship Series ==
=== (2) Texas Rangers vs. (3) Detroit Tigers ===
Texas won the series, 4–2.

Game	Date	Score	Location	Time	Attendance
1	October 8	Detroit Tigers – 2, Texas Rangers – 3	Rangers Ballpark in Arlington	3:07 (1:50 delay)	50,114
2	October 10†	Detroit Tigers – 3, Texas Rangers – 7 (11)	Rangers Ballpark in Arlington	4:25	51,227
3	October 11	Texas Rangers – 2, Detroit Tigers – 5	Comerica Park	3:08	41,905
4	October 12	Texas Rangers – 7, Detroit Tigers – 3 (11)	Comerica Park	4:00 (2:13 delay)	42,234
5	October 13	Texas Rangers – 5, Detroit Tigers – 7	Comerica Park	3:21	41,908
6	October 15	Detroit Tigers – 5, Texas Rangers – 15	Rangers Ballpark in Arlington	3:32	51,508

†: postponed from October 9 due to rain

The Rangers defeated the Tigers in six games to return to the World Series for the second year in a row (in the process denying a rematch of the 2006 World Series between the Tigers and Cardinals).

In Game 1, the Rangers shocked Tigers’ ace and eventual AL Cy Young winner Justin Verlander in a narrow 3-2 victory. In Game 2, the game remained tied through ten innings, until Nelson Cruz walked it off for the Rangers with a grand slam in the bottom of the eleventh to take a 2–0 series lead headed to Detroit. Doug Fister pitched seven solid innings and Víctor Martínez finally ignited the Tigers’ offense as they took Game 3. Game 4 was a tight contest in regulation, where the Tigers came back to tie the game, but were unable to regain the lead as Cruz tagged Miguel Cabrera out at home in the bottom of the eighth, resulting in extras once again. Then in the top of the eleventh, Mike Napoli drove in Josh Hamilton with an RBI single to put the Rangers in the lead for good, then Cruz once again got the better of the Tigers with a three-run home run to put the game out of reach. In Game 5, Verlander redeemed himself on the mound with a solid seven inning performance and the Tigers narrowly prevailed to send the series back to Arlington despite Cruz’s late-inning heroics. The Rangers then blew out the Tigers by ten runs in Game 6, handing Max Scherzer his worst postseason loss ever.

The Tigers would return to the ALCS the following year, sweeping the New York Yankees before falling in the World Series.

The Rangers would win their next and most recent pennant in 2023 over their in-state rival in the Houston Astros in seven games en route to a World Series title.

== National League Championship Series ==
=== (2) Milwaukee Brewers vs. (4) St. Louis Cardinals ===
St. Louis won the series, 4–2.

Game	Date	Score	Location	Time	Attendance
1	October 9	St. Louis Cardinals – 6, Milwaukee Brewers – 9	Miller Park	3:35	43,613
2	October 10	St. Louis Cardinals – 12, Milwaukee Brewers – 3	Miller Park	3:36	43,937
3	October 12	Milwaukee Brewers – 3, St. Louis Cardinals – 4	Busch Stadium	3:10	43,584
4	October 13	Milwaukee Brewers – 4, St. Louis Cardinals – 2	Busch Stadium	3:25	45,606
5	October 14	Milwaukee Brewers – 1, St. Louis Cardinals – 7	Busch Stadium	3:09	46,904
6	October 16	St. Louis Cardinals – 12, Milwaukee Brewers – 6	Miller Park	3:43	43,926

This was the second postseason meeting between the Cardinals and Brewers. They last met in the 1982 World Series, which the Cardinals won in seven games for their ninth championship. The Cardinals once again defeated the Brewers, this time in six games, to return to the World Series for the first time since 2006.

Game 1 was an offensive slugfest which the Brewers won 9–6, thanks to home runs from Ryan Braun, Prince Fielder and Yuniesky Betancourt. In Game 2, the Cardinals blew out the Brewers to even the series headed to St. Louis. Chris Carpenter and the Cardinals' bullpen would fend off a potential rally by the Brewers as they won 4–3 to take the series lead. In Game 4, Randy Wolf pitched seven solid innings as the Brewers came from behind to win and even the series at two. The Cardinals blew out the Brewers again in Game 5 to take a 3–2 series lead headed back to Milwaukee. The Cardinals would clinch the pennant in another blowout win in Game 6, thanks to home runs from David Freese, Rafael Furcal, and Albert Pujols.

This was the first of three consecutive losses in the NLCS for the Brewers. They would return to the NLCS in 2018 and 2025, but they lost both to the Los Angeles Dodgers. The Brewers would eventually win their first pennant as an NL team in 2026 in a sweep over the Dodgers en route to a World Series title.

The Cardinals returned to the NLCS the next year, but lost to the eventual World Series champion San Francisco Giants in seven games after leading the series 3–1. The Cardinals would win their next and most recent pennant two years later over their archrival in the Los Angeles Dodgers in six games before falling in the World Series.

== 2011 World Series ==
=== (AL2) Texas Rangers vs. (NL4) St. Louis Cardinals ===
St. Louis won the series, 4–3.

Game	Date	Score	Location	Time	Attendance
1	October 19	Texas Rangers – 2, St. Louis Cardinals – 3	Busch Stadium	3:06	46,406
2	October 20	Texas Rangers – 2, St. Louis Cardinals – 1	Busch Stadium	3:04	47,288
3	October 22	St. Louis Cardinals – 16, Texas Rangers – 7	Rangers Ballpark in Arlington	4:04	51,462
4	October 23	St. Louis Cardinals – 0, Texas Rangers – 4	Rangers Ballpark in Arlington	3:07	51,539
5	October 24	St. Louis Cardinals – 2, Texas Rangers – 4	Rangers Ballpark in Arlington	3:31	51,459
6	October 27†	Texas Rangers – 9, St. Louis Cardinals – 10 (11)	Busch Stadium	4:33	47,325
7	October 28	Texas Rangers – 2, St. Louis Cardinals – 6	Busch Stadium	3:17	47,399

†: Postponed from October 26 due to rain

In what is considered by many to be one of the greatest World Series ever played, the Cardinals defeated the Rangers in seven games to win their eleventh championship in franchise history.

Chris Carpenter pitched six solid innings as the Cardinals took Game 1. In Game 2, the Cardinals held a 1-0 lead going into the top of the ninth, until the Rangers put up two unanswered runs from back-to-back sacrifice flys from Josh Hamilton and Michael Young, which evened the series headed to Arlington. Albert Pujols hit three home runs in Game 3 as the Cardinals blew out the Rangers to regain the series lead. However, things then went south for the Cardinals. Derek Holland pitched eight innings of shutout baseball in Game 4 as the Rangers shutout the Cardinals to even the series. In Game 5, the Cardinals took an early 2-0 lead, but the Rangers scored four unanswered runs to take a 3-2 series lead headed back to St. Louis, now one win away from their first championship.

Game 6 was the most memorable contest of the series - the Cardinals, after being down to their final strike in the bottom of the ninth, tied the game thanks to a two-run RBI triple from David Freese. In the top of the tenth, the Rangers regained the lead thanks to a two-run home run from Hamilton. In the bottom of the inning, the Rangers were once again one strike away from the championship despite their lead being cut to one. However, Lance Berkman managed to bring in an RBI single, tying the game once again. Then, in the bottom of the eleventh, the Cardinals prevailed thanks to a walk-off home run from Freese. In Game 7, the Rangers again took an early lead in the top of the first inning, however the Cardinals would score six unanswered runs to take the lead for good and secure the title.

As of 2026, the 2011 Cardinals remain the most recent team to win Game 7 of the World Series at home, as the next five Fall Classics that went the full seven games (2014, 2016, 2017, 2019, 2025) would be won by the road team. The Cardinals became the first team to win the World Series after being a strike away from elimination twice in Game 6 and trailing early in Game 7 since the New York Mets did so in 1986. The Cardinals would return to the World Series two years later, but they fell to the Boston Red Sox in six games.

With the loss, the Rangers became the first team since the 1991–92 Atlanta Braves to lose in back-to-back World Series appearances. The Rangers would return to the World Series in 2023, winning their first title in franchise history over the Arizona Diamondbacks in five games.

== Broadcasting ==
This was the fifth postseason under a seven-year U.S. rights agreement with Fox and TBS. TBS primarily aired all Division Series games, with sister network TNT used as an overflow channel. TBS also had the National League Championship Series. Fox televised the American League Championship Series and the World Series.
