= 2012 Major League Baseball postseason =

2012 Major League Baseball playoffs

Tournament details
- Dates: October 5–28, 2012
- Teams: 10

Final positions
- Champions: San Francisco Giants (7th title)
- Runners-up: Detroit Tigers

Tournament statistics
- Most HRs: Pablo Sandoval (SF) (6)
- Most SBs: Carlos Beltrán (STL) & Nate McLouth (BAL) (3)
- Most Ks (as pitcher): Justin Verlander (DET) (29)

Awards
- MVP: Pablo Sandoval (SF)

The 2012 Major League Baseball postseason was the playoff tournament of Major League Baseball for the 2012 season. The winners of the Division Series moved on to the League Championship Series to determine the pennant winners that face each other in the World Series. A new Wild Card Game was introduced as the opening round of the postseason, which features the #4 and #5 seeds of each league, and the winner faced the team with the best record in the Division Series, marking the first expansion of the postseason since 1995. As a result of this new format, two teams from the same division can now meet in the Division Series. In the past (from 1995–2011), if the team with the best record in their league and the wild card resided in the same division, the wild card would instead be assigned to face the second-seeded division champion while the team with the best record in their league to face the third-seeded division champion. This meant that the only way two teams in the same division could meet in the postseason would be the League Championship Series, provided both teams won their respective Division Series.

In the American League, the New York Yankees made their seventeenth postseason appearance of the past eighteen years, the Detroit Tigers returned for the second year in a row, the Oakland Athletics made their first appearance since 2006, the Texas Rangers returned for the third straight time, and the Baltimore Orioles made their first postseason appearance since 1997.

In the National League, the San Francisco Giants and Cincinnati Reds returned for the second time in three years, the St. Louis Cardinals made their second straight appearance, the Atlanta Braves returned for the second time in three years, and the Washington Nationals ended over three decades of futility by making their first postseason appearance since 1981 (when they were originally the Montreal Expos), ending what was the longest postseason drought in the majors since the 1969 expansion.

This is the last edition of the postseason to not feature the Los Angeles Dodgers, who would start a streak of what is currently fourteen straight postseason appearances the next season.

The postseason began on October 5, 2012, and ended on October 28, 2012, with the Giants sweeping the Tigers in the 2012 World Series. It was the second title in three years for the Giants and their seventh overall.

For the first time in the history of the Division Series, all four series went the maximum five games.

== Playoff seeds ==
With the addition of the Wild Card Game, the three division winners all gained a first-round bye. The fourth and fifth seeded teams of each league would play in the Wild Card game to determine the winner who played the top seed in each league.

American League Teams National League Teams

The following teams qualified for the postseason:

=== American League ===
1. New York Yankees – 95–67, AL East champions
2. Oakland Athletics – 94–68, AL West champions
3. Detroit Tigers – 88–74, AL Central champions
4. Texas Rangers – 93–69 (5–2 head-to-head record vs. BAL)
5. Baltimore Orioles – 93–69 (2–5 head-to-head record vs. TEX)

=== National League ===
1. Washington Nationals – 98–64, NL East champions
2. Cincinnati Reds – 97–65, NL Central champions
3. San Francisco Giants – 94–68, NL West champions
4. Atlanta Braves – 94–68
5. St. Louis Cardinals – 88–74

== Playoff bracket ==
Wild Card Game (ALWC, NLWC)
4	Texas	0
5	Baltimore	1
4	Atlanta	0
5	St. Louis	1

Division Series (ALDS, NLDS)
1	NY Yankees	3
5	Baltimore	2
American League
2	Oakland	2
3	Detroit	3
1	Washington	2
5	St. Louis	3
National League
2	Cincinnati	2
3	San Francisco	3

League Championship Series (ALCS, NLCS)
1	NY Yankees	0
3	Detroit	4
5	St. Louis	3
3	San Francisco	4

World Series
AL3	Detroit	0
NL3	San Francisco	4

== American League Wild Card ==
=== (4) Texas Rangers vs. (5) Baltimore Orioles ===
October 5, 2012 7:38 pm (CDT) at Rangers Ballpark in Arlington, Texas, 75 °F (24 °C), partly cloudy
Team	1	2	3	4	5	6	7	8	9	R	H	E
Baltimore	1	0	0	0	0	1	1	0	2	5	8	2
Texas	1	0	0	0	0	0	0	0	0	1	9	2
WP: Joe Saunders (1–0) LP: Yu Darvish (0–1); Attendance: 46,931; Boxscore

This was the first postseason meeting between the Orioles and Rangers. The Orioles defeated the two-time defending American League champion Rangers in the inaugural AL Wild Card game to return to the ALDS for the first time since 1997.

Both teams would meet again in the ALDS in 2023, which would be won by the Rangers in a sweep en route to a World Series title.

== National League Wild Card ==
=== (4) Atlanta Braves vs. (5) St. Louis Cardinals ===
October 5, 2012 5:08 pm (EDT) at Turner Field in Atlanta, Georgia, 81 °F (27 °C), clear
Team	1	2	3	4	5	6	7	8	9	R	H	E
St. Louis	0	0	0	3	0	1	2	0	0	6	6	0
Atlanta	0	2	0	0	0	0	1	0	0	3	12	3
WP: Kyle Lohse (1–0) LP: Kris Medlen (0–1) Sv: Jason Motte (1); Home runs: STL: Matt Holliday (1); ATL: David Ross (1); Attendance: 52,631; Boxscore

This was the fourth postseason meeting between the Cardinals and Braves. The Cardinals defeated the Braves in the inaugural Wild Card Game to advance to the NLDS for the second year in a row.

Both teams would meet again in the NLDS in 2019, which the Cardinals won.

== American League Division Series ==
=== (1) New York Yankees vs. (5) Baltimore Orioles ===
New York won the series, 3–2.

Game	Date	Score	Location	Time	Attendance
1	October 7	New York Yankees – 7, Baltimore Orioles – 2	Oriole Park at Camden Yards	3:31	47,841
2	October 8	New York Yankees – 2, Baltimore Orioles – 3	Oriole Park at Camden Yards	3:11	48,187
3	October 10	Baltimore Orioles – 2, New York Yankees – 3 (12)	Yankee Stadium	3:31	50,497
4	October 11	Baltimore Orioles – 2, New York Yankees – 1 (13)	Yankee Stadium	4:31	49,307
5	October 12	Baltimore Orioles – 1, New York Yankees – 3	Yankee Stadium	2:52	47,081

This was the second postseason meeting between the Yankees and Orioles. They last met in the ALCS in 1996, which the Yankees won in five games en route to starting a World Series dynasty. The Yankees once again defeated the Orioles in a tightly-contested series to advance to the ALCS for the sixth time in twelve years.

CC Sabathia pitched 8 2/3 solid innings as the Yankees took Game 1. In Game 2, the Yankees took an early lead, but a two-run RBI single from Chris Davis in the bottom of the third put the Orioles in the lead for good as they evened the series heading to the Bronx. Games 3 and 4 were both long extra-inning affairs — in Game 3, the Yankees rallied in the bottom of the ninth to tie the game thanks to a solo home run from Raúl Ibañez, and then he did it again on the first pitch in the bottom of the twelfth to give the Yankees the series lead. Game 4 was another long extra-inning affair that lasted thirteen innings — the game remained scoreless for six innings after the bottom of the sixth, until Manny Machado helped the Orioles even the series by scoring on an RBI double from J. J. Hardy. The Yankees would ultimately close out the series in Game 5 as Sabathia pitched a four-hit complete game.

=== (2) Oakland Athletics vs. (3) Detroit Tigers ===
Detroit won the series, 3–2.

Game	Date	Score	Location	Time	Attendance
1	October 6	Oakland Athletics – 1, Detroit Tigers – 3	Comerica Park	2:56	43,323
2	October 7	Oakland Athletics – 4, Detroit Tigers – 5	Comerica Park	3:28	40,684
3	October 9	Detroit Tigers – 0, Oakland Athletics – 2	O.co Coliseum	2:33	37,090
4	October 10	Detroit Tigers – 3, Oakland Athletics – 4	O.co Coliseum	3:21	36,385
5	October 11	Detroit Tigers – 6, Oakland Athletics – 0	O.co Coliseum	2:56	36,393

This was the third postseason meeting between the Athletics and Tigers. Despite blowing a 2–0 series lead, the Tigers defeated the Athletics in five games to advance to the ALCS for the second year in a row and third in the last seven years.

Justin Verlander and the Tigers' bullpen secured the first game, while in Game 2 the Tigers prevailed in the bottom of the ninth thanks to a sacrifice fly from Don Kelly. When the series shifted to Oakland, Brett Anderson helped the Athletics shut out the Tigers in Game 3, and then rallied with three runs in the bottom of the ninth inning of Game 4 to even the series. However, Verlander would pitch a four-hit complete game shutout in Game 5 as the Tigers won 6–0 to close out the series.

This series was an inversion of the 1972 ALCS between both teams. In that ALCS, the Athletics took the first two games at home, and while the Tigers evened the series in Detroit, fell by one run in Game 5.

Both teams would meet in the ALDS again the next year, with the same result as this series.

== National League Division Series ==
=== (1) Washington Nationals vs. (5) St. Louis Cardinals ===
St. Louis won the series, 3–2.

Game	Date	Score	Location	Time	Attendance
1	October 7	Washington Nationals – 3, St. Louis Cardinals – 2	Busch Stadium	3:40	47,078
2	October 8	Washington Nationals – 4, St. Louis Cardinals – 12	Busch Stadium	3:27	45,840
3	October 10	St. Louis Cardinals – 8, Washington Nationals – 0	Nationals Park	3:32	45,017
4	October 11	St. Louis Cardinals – 1, Washington Nationals – 2	Nationals Park	2:55	44,392
5	October 12	St. Louis Cardinals – 9, Washington Nationals – 7	Nationals Park	3:49	45,966

This was the first postseason meeting between the Cardinals and Nationals. The Cardinals rallied late in Game 5 to upset the MLB-best Nationals and advance to the NLCS for the second year in a row and sixth time in the last ten years.

The Nationals rallied to take Game 1 on the road thanks to a two-run RBI from Tyler Moore in the top of the eighth. In Game 2, the Cardinals blew out the Nationals to even the series headed to Washington. In the first postseason game in the nation’s capital since 1933, the Nationals would disappoint as Chris Carpenter pitched nearly six innings of shutout ball in another Cardinals’ blowout win, and looked poised to close out the series. However, the Nationals responded. Game 4 was tied going into the bottom of the ninth, until Jayson Werth hit a walk-off solo home run to give the Nationals the victory and force a decisive fifth game. In Game 5, the Nationals held a 7–5 lead in the top of the ninth and were one out away from advancing to the NLCS for the first time in 31 years. However, the Nationals' bullpen imploded, as they gave up four unanswered runs as the Cardinals took the lead for good. The Cardinals then closed out the series in the bottom of the ninth to advance. The Cardinals set the record for the largest deficit a team overcame to win a winner-take-all game at six runs.

With the win, the Cardinals became the first fifth-seeded team to knock off a number one seed in the Division Series. Both teams would meet again in the NLCS in 2019, which was won by the Nationals in a sweep en route to a World Series title.

=== (2) Cincinnati Reds vs. (3) San Francisco Giants ===
San Francisco won the series, 3–2.

Game	Date	Score	Location	Time	Attendance
1	October 6	Cincinnati Reds – 5, San Francisco Giants – 2	AT&T Park	3:27	43,492
2	October 7	Cincinnati Reds – 9, San Francisco Giants – 0	AT&T Park	3:14	43,505
3	October 9	San Francisco Giants – 2, Cincinnati Reds – 1 (10)	Great American Ball Park	3:41	44,501
4	October 10	San Francisco Giants – 8, Cincinnati Reds – 3	Great American Ball Park	3:35	44,375
5	October 11	San Francisco Giants – 6, Cincinnati Reds – 4	Great American Ball Park	3:52	44,142

The Giants overcame a two-games-to-none series deficit to defeat the Reds in five games, advancing to the NLCS for the second time in three years.

Home runs from Brandon Phillips and Jay Bruce helped the Reds steal Game 1 on the road to win their first postseason game since 1995. In Game 2, Bronson Arroyo outdueled San Francisco ace Madison Bumgarner as the Reds blew out the Giants to take a 2–0 series lead headed to Cincinnati, handing Bumgarner his worst postseason loss ever. The Giants narrowly prevailed in an extra-inning Game 3 to avoid elimination. In Game 4, the Giants blew out the Reds to force a decisive fifth game. Then in Game 5, the Giants jumped out to a 6–0 lead, and Sergio Romo stopped a late rally by the Reds to preserve a two-run victory, completing the Giants’ comeback.

The Giants were the second team to lose the first two games at home in a best-of-five series. However, the Giants became the first to accomplish the feat by winning all three elimination games on the road.

To date, this is the last postseason appearance outside of the Wild Card round for the Reds.

== American League Championship Series ==
=== (1) New York Yankees vs. (3) Detroit Tigers ===
Detroit won the series, 4–0.

Game	Date	Score	Location	Time	Attendance
1	October 13	Detroit Tigers – 6, New York Yankees – 4 (12)	Yankee Stadium	4:54	47,122
2	October 14	Detroit Tigers – 3, New York Yankees – 0	Yankee Stadium	3:18	47,082
3	October 16	New York Yankees – 1, Detroit Tigers – 2	Comerica Park	3:28	42,490
4	October 18†	New York Yankees – 1, Detroit Tigers – 8	Comerica Park	3:27	42,477

†: postponed from October 17 due to rain

This was the third postseason meeting between the Tigers and Yankees (2006, 2011). The Tigers swept the Yankees to advance to the World Series for the second time in six years (in the process denying a rematch of the 1962 World Series between the Yankees and Giants).

Despite Raúl Ibañez’s efforts to help the Yankees force extra innings, the Tigers managed to take Game 1 on the road after a grueling twelve-inning contest thanks to an RBI single from Andy Dirks. Game 1 would ultimately be Derek Jeter’s final postseason game, as he missed the rest of the series due to a season ending injury to his left ankle. Game 1 was also the final postseason game for Yankees’ pitching legend Andy Pettitte. In Game 2, the Tigers shut out the Yankees thanks to seven shutout innings pitched by Aníbal Sánchez and Phil Coke shutting out the Yankees in the eighth and ninth. In Detroit, Justin Verlander helped secure a narrow victory for the Tigers in Game 3 as he took a shutout into the ninth. In Game 4, the Tigers blew out the Yankees to secure the pennant. Game 4 would ultimately be Ichiro Suzuki’s final postseason game.

This was the last time the Yankees were swept in the ALCS until 2022. The Yankees returned to the ALCS in 2017, 2019, and 2022, but they would lose all three to the Houston Astros. It would be in 2024 that the Yankees would finally break through once more, as they defeated the now-Cleveland Guardians in five games for the pennant before falling in the World Series.

With the win, the Tigers improved their postseason record against the Yankees to 3–0, and became the first team ever to win three consecutive postseason series against the Yankees. The Tigers returned to the ALCS the next year, but they fell to the eventual World Series champion Boston Red Sox in six games. As of 2026, this is the last time the Tigers won the AL pennant, and is the most recent conference championship won by a Detroit-based team.

== National League Championship Series ==
=== (3) San Francisco Giants vs. (5) St. Louis Cardinals ===
San Francisco won the series, 4–3.

Game	Date	Score	Location	Time	Attendance
1	October 14	St. Louis Cardinals – 6, San Francisco Giants – 4	AT&T Park	3:21	42,534
2	October 15	St. Louis Cardinals – 1, San Francisco Giants – 7	AT&T Park	3:10	42,679
3	October 17	San Francisco Giants – 1, St. Louis Cardinals – 3	Busch Stadium	3:02 (3:28 rain delay)	45,850
4	October 18	San Francisco Giants – 3, St. Louis Cardinals – 8	Busch Stadium	3:17	47,062
5	October 19	San Francisco Giants – 5, St. Louis Cardinals – 0	Busch Stadium	3:03	47,075
6	October 21	St. Louis Cardinals – 1, San Francisco Giants – 6	AT&T Park	2:55	43,070
7	October 22	St. Louis Cardinals – 0, San Francisco Giants – 9	AT&T Park	3:35	43,056

This was the third postseason meeting between the Cardinals and Giants. They had split the previous two meetings, in 1987 (Cardinals victory), and 2002 (Giants victory). The Giants overcame a 3–1 series deficit to defeat the defending World Series champion Cardinals in seven games, returning to the World Series for the third time in ten years (in the process denying a rematch of the 2006 World Series between the Cardinals and Tigers).

The Cardinals stole Game 1 on the road, while Ryan Vogelsong helped the Giants blow out the Cardinals in Game 2 with a solid seven-inning pitching performance. In St. Louis, the Cardinals narrowly prevailed in Game 3, and Adam Wainwright had a solid seven-inning performance in Game 4 as the Cardinals won by a convincing 8–3 score to take a 3–1 series lead. However, the Cardinals failed to maintain the lead. Barry Zito pitched eight shutout innings as the Giants won 5–0 to send the series back to San Francisco. Vogelsong again helped keep the Cardinals offense at bay in Game 6 to force a seventh game. The Giants blew out the Cardinals in Game 7 to clinch the pennant. This was the Game 7 ever won by the Giants in franchise history.

With this win, the Giants moved up to 2–1 against the Cardinals in the postseason. The Giants became the first team in MLB history to overcome both a 2–0 and 3–1 series deficit in the Division Series and League Championship Series respectively to reach the World Series. The Giants and Cardinals would meet one more time in the NLCS in 2014, which the Giants won in five games en route to their most recent title and capping off a dynasty of three World Series titles in five years.

The Cardinals returned to the NLCS the next year, and defeated the Los Angeles Dodgers in six games for their most recent pennant, but they came up short in the World Series.

== 2012 World Series ==
=== (AL3) Detroit Tigers vs. (NL3) San Francisco Giants ===
San Francisco won the series, 4–0.

Game	Date	Score	Location	Time	Attendance
1	October 24	Detroit Tigers – 3, San Francisco Giants – 8	AT&T Park	3:26	42,855
2	October 25	Detroit Tigers – 0, San Francisco Giants – 2	AT&T Park	3:05	42,982
3	October 27	San Francisco Giants – 2, Detroit Tigers – 0	Comerica Park	3:25	42,262
4	October 28	San Francisco Giants – 4, Detroit Tigers – 3 (10)	Comerica Park	3:34	42,152

This was the Giants' fifth World Series matchup against a team from the current American League Central Division. Previously they had faced the White Sox in 1917 (won by the White Sox), the Twins/Senators in 1924 (won by the Senators), and 1933 (won by the Giants), and the Indians in 1954 (won by the Giants).

The Tigers were considered as the favorite to win the title even though the Giants had the better record and home-field advantage. Despite having Triple Crown winner Miguel Cabrera, and the top two pitchers in the American League in Justin Verlander and Max Scherzer, the heavily-favored Tigers were shockingly swept by the Giants, who won their second title in three years and seventh overall.

The Giants chased Verlander from the mound in a blowout victory in Game 1 which included Pablo Sandoval hitting three home runs. In Game 2, Madison Bumgarner out-dueled Doug Fister on the mound as the Giants won 2-0 to take a 2–0 series lead headed to Detroit. In Game 3, Ryan Vogelsong out-dueled Aníbal Sánchez as the Giants again won by a 2-0 score to take a commanding three games to none series lead. In Game 4, the Tigers finally showed signs of life, as a two-run home run by Cabrera in the bottom of the third gave the Tigers their first lead of the series, and then Delmon Young hit a solo homer in the bottom of the sixth which ended up forcing extras. However, Marco Scutaro hit an RBI single in the top of the tenth that put the Giants in the lead for good, and Sergio Romo pitched a one-two-three tenth, striking out Cabrera for the title. This was the third straight World Series win by the National League. As of 2026, this is the most recent World Series to end in a sweep.

This was the first time the Tigers had been swept in the World Series since their first appearance in 1907, and the first time they lost the World Series at home since 1934. As of 2026, this is the last appearance by a Detroit-based team in the championship round in either one of the four major North American sports leagues.

With the win, the Giants moved up to 3–2 against AL Central teams in the World Series. The Giants would return to the World Series in 2014 to face another AL Central team in the Kansas City Royals, who they defeated in seven games for their most recent championship, capping off a dynasty of three titles in five years.

== Broadcasting ==
This was the sixth postseason under a seven-year U.S. rights agreement with Fox and TBS. Under the original contract, TBS was awarded all Division Series games, with sister network TNT used as an overflow channel. It was then agreed to give the two new Wild Card games to TBS/TNT, and, in exchange, award the league-owned MLB Network the rights to televise two Division Series games. TBS also had the American League Championship Series. Fox televised the National League Championship Series and the World Series.
