= 2007 Major League Baseball postseason =

2007 Major League Baseball playoffs

Tournament details
- Dates: October 3–28, 2007
- Teams: 8

Final positions
- Champions: Boston Red Sox (7th title)
- Runners-up: Colorado Rockies

Tournament statistics
- Most HRs: Matt Holliday (COL) (5)
- Most SBs: Seven tied (2)
- Most Ks (as pitcher): Josh Beckett (BOS) (35)

Awards
- MVP: Mike Lowell (BOS)

The 2007 Major League Baseball postseason was the playoff tournament of Major League Baseball for the 2007 season. The winners of the Division Series would move on to the League Championship Series to determine the pennant winners that face each other in the World Series.

In the American League, the New York Yankees made their thirteenth straight postseason appearance(The only team to make it after appearing in 2006), the Boston Red Sox returned for the fourth time in five years, the Cleveland Indians returned for the first time since 2001, and the Los Angeles Angels of Anaheim returned for the fourth time in six years.

In the National League, the Arizona Diamondbacks made their third postseason appearance in the last eight years. Joining them were the Chicago Cubs, who made their second appearance in five years. The next team was the Colorado Rockies, who made their second postseason appearance in franchise history and first since 1995. The Rockies had reached the playoffs by winning 14 of their last 15 games. Lastly, the Philadelphia Phillies returned to the postseason for the first time since 1993. This would be the first of five straight postseason appearances for the Phillies, a streak which lasted until 2011.

The postseason began on October 3, 2007, and ended on October 28, 2007, with the Red Sox sweeping the Rockies in the 2007 World Series. It was the seventh title won by the Red Sox franchise. This would be the last time until 2024 in which both teams who made the previous year's World Series failed to make the playoffs.

== Playoff seeds ==
American League Teams National League Teams

The following teams qualified for the postseason:

=== American League ===
1. Boston Red Sox – 96–66, AL East champions (5–2 head-to-head record vs. CLE)
2. Cleveland Indians – 96–66, AL Central champions (2–5 head-to-head record vs. BOS)
3. Los Angeles Angels of Anaheim – 94–68, AL West champions
4. New York Yankees – 94–68

=== National League ===
1. Arizona Diamondbacks – 90–72, NL West champions
2. Philadelphia Phillies – 89–73, NL East champions
3. Chicago Cubs – 85–77, NL Central champions
4. Colorado Rockies – 90–73

== Playoff bracket ==
Division Series (ALDS, NLDS)
1	Boston	3
3	LA Angels	0
American League
2	Cleveland	3
4	NY Yankees	1
1	Arizona	3
3	Chicago Cubs	0
National League
2	Philadelphia	0
4	Colorado	3

League Championship Series (NLCS, ALCS)
1	Boston	4
2	Cleveland	3
1	Arizona	0
4	Colorado	4

World Series
AL1	Boston	4
NL4	Colorado	0

Note: Two teams in the same division could not meet in the division series.

== American League Division Series ==
=== (1) Boston Red Sox vs. (3) Los Angeles Angels of Anaheim ===
Boston won the series, 3–0.

Game	Date	Score	Location	Time	Attendance
1	October 3	Los Angeles Angels of Anaheim – 0, Boston Red Sox – 4	Fenway Park	2:27	37,597
2	October 5	Los Angeles Angels of Anaheim – 3, Boston Red Sox – 6	Fenway Park	4:05	37,706
3	October 7	Boston Red Sox – 9, Los Angeles Angels of Anaheim – 1	Angel Stadium of Anaheim	3:29	45,262

This was the third postseason meeting between the Angels and Red Sox (1986, 2004). The Red Sox once again swept the Angels to advance to the ALCS for the third time in five years.

The series was not close — Josh Beckett pitched a four-hit complete game shutout as the Red Sox took Game 1. They then took Game 2 on a Manny Ramirez walk-off three-run home run to take a 2–0 series lead headed to Anaheim. The Red Sox blew out the Angels in Game 3 to advance to the next round.

Both teams would meet again in the ALDS in 2008, which the Red Sox won in four games. The Angels would finally prevail over the Red Sox by sweeping them in the 2009 ALDS.

=== (2) Cleveland Indians vs. (4) New York Yankees ===
Cleveland won the series, 3–1.

Game	Date	Score	Location	Time	Attendance
1	October 4	New York Yankees – 3, Cleveland Indians – 12	Jacobs Field	3:44	44,608
2	October 5	New York Yankees – 1, Cleveland Indians – 2 (11)	Jacobs Field	4:23	44,732
3	October 7	Cleveland Indians – 4, New York Yankees – 8	Yankee Stadium (I)	3:38	56,358
4	October 8	Cleveland Indians – 6, New York Yankees – 4	Yankee Stadium (I)	4:03	56,315

This was the third postseason meeting between the Yankees and Indians. The Indians defeated the Yankees in four games to advance to the ALCS for the first time since 1998.

The Indians blew out the Yankees in Game 1 by a 12–3 score in part due to home runs from four different players. Game 2 was a pitchers' duel between both teams bullpens which lasted eleven innings, and again the Indians prevailed as Travis Hafner drove in the winning run on a bases-loaded single off Luis Vizcaíno. Game 2 was referred to as "The Bug Game", as a swarm of tiny insects circled the mound in the late innings of the game. Play was stopped temporarily out of concern for the players' safety, including Joba Chamberlain, who threw only 12 of his 25 pitches for strikes in suffering a blown save without surrendering a hit. Yankees manager Joe Torre would later say that his decision not to remove his team from the field was one of his biggest regrets as a manager. When the series shifted to the Bronx for Game 3, the Yankees overcame a 3–1 Indians lead to win 8–4 to stave off elimination. Game 3 would ultimately be Roger Clemens’ final postseason game, as he was forced to leave the mound after aggravating a hamstring injury, and would retire after the series ended. The Yankees put up another rally late in Game 4, but the Indians held on to win by a 6–4 score to advance to the ALCS. Game 4 was the last postseason game ever played at the original Yankee Stadium.

The loss to the Indians marked the end of the Yankees' thirteen-year postseason streak, which started in 1995. The Yankees' thirteen-year streak is the longest of any American League team, and is currently the third longest streak in MLB history. The only teams with a longer streak are the Atlanta Braves (1991-2005 (excluding 1994, when the season was canceled due to a strike)), and the Los Angeles Dodgers (2013-present), both of whom made fourteen straight postseason appearances.

As of 2026, this is the last time the Indians/Guardians defeated the Yankees in the postseason.

== National League Division Series ==
=== (1) Arizona Diamondbacks vs. (3) Chicago Cubs ===
Arizona won the series, 3–0.

Game	Date	Score	Location	Time	Attendance
1	October 3	Chicago Cubs – 1, Arizona Diamondbacks – 3	Chase Field	2:33	48,864
2	October 4	Chicago Cubs – 4, Arizona Diamondbacks – 8	Chase Field	3:44	48,575
3	October 6	Arizona Diamondbacks – 5, Chicago Cubs – 1	Wrigley Field	3:22	42,157

The Diamondbacks swept the Cubs to return to the NLCS for the second time in six years.

Brandon Webb pitched seven solid innings as the Diamondbacks took Game 1. In Game 2, the Cubs took a 2-0 lead in the top of the second thanks to an RBI single from Matt Murton and a home run from Geovany Soto, but the Diamondbacks took the lead for good off a three-run homer by Chris Young and won 8-4 to take a 2–0 series lead headed to Chicago. Liván Hernández pitched six solid innings and the Diamondbacks bullpen kept the Cubs' offense at bay in Game 3 as Arizona won 5–1 to return to the NLCS.

=== (2) Philadelphia Phillies vs. (4) Colorado Rockies ===
Colorado won the series, 3–0.

Game	Date	Score	Location	Time	Attendance
1	October 3	Colorado Rockies – 4, Philadelphia Phillies – 2	Citizens Bank Park	2:52	45,655
2	October 4	Colorado Rockies – 10, Philadelphia Phillies – 5	Citizens Bank Park	3:32	45,991
3	October 6	Philadelphia Phillies – 1, Colorado Rockies – 2	Coors Field	2:59	50,724

This was the first postseason meeting between the Phillies and Rockies. The Rockies swept the Phillies to advance to the NLCS for the first time in franchise history.

Jeff Francis outdueled Cole Hamels as the Rockies stole Game 1 on the road. The Rockies blew out the Phillies in Game 2 to take a 2–0 series lead headed to Denver, as Troy Tulowitzki, Matt Holliday, and Kazuo Matsui all homered for Colorado. Game 3 remained tied until the bottom of the eighth, when Jeff Baker hit an RBI single to put the Rockies in the lead for good, completing the sweep.

These two teams would meet once more in the NLDS in 2009, which the Phillies won in four games before falling in the World Series.

== American League Championship Series ==
=== (1) Boston Red Sox vs. (2) Cleveland Indians ===
Boston won the series, 4–3.

Game	Date	Score	Location	Time	Attendance
1	October 12	Cleveland Indians – 3, Boston Red Sox – 10	Fenway Park	3:35	36,986
2	October 13	Cleveland Indians – 13, Boston Red Sox – 6 (11)	Fenway Park	5:14	37,051
3	October 15	Boston Red Sox – 2, Cleveland Indians – 4	Jacobs Field	3:28	44,402
4	October 16	Boston Red Sox – 3, Cleveland Indians – 7	Jacobs Field	3:12	44,008
5	October 18	Boston Red Sox – 7, Cleveland Indians – 1	Jacobs Field	3:46	44,588
6	October 20	Cleveland Indians – 2, Boston Red Sox – 12	Fenway Park	3:09	37,163
7	October 21	Cleveland Indians – 2, Boston Red Sox – 11	Fenway Park	3:33	37,165

This was the fourth postseason meeting between the Indians and Red Sox (1995, 1998, 1999), and was their first meeting outside of the ALDS. The Red Sox came back from a 3–1 series deficit to defeat the Indians in seven games, returning to the World Series for the second time in four years.

Similar to 2004, the Red Sox once again found themselves trailing in the series. The Red Sox blew out the Indians in Game 1. In Game 2, the Indians evened the series with a blowout win of their own in extra innings thanks to home runs from Jhonny Peralta, Grady Sizemore, and Franklin Gutiérrez. When the series shifted to Cleveland for Game 3, Jake Westbrook out-dueled Boston ace Daisuke Matsuzaka as the Indians prevailed by a 4–2 score to take the series lead. The Indians' offense would chase Tim Wakefield from the mound in Game 4 thanks to a seven run fifth inning to take a 3–1 series lead, and were now one win away from their first World Series berth in a decade. However, things then unraveled for the Indians fast. In Game 5, Josh Beckett pitched eight solid innings as he out-dueled CC Sabathia in a Red Sox blowout win to send the series back to Fenway Park. Curt Schilling went seven strong innings as the Red Sox blew out the Indians again in Game 6 to force a seventh game. The Red Sox's 12-2 margin of victory in Game 6 was the largest in an LCS game since Game 7 of the 1996 NLCS. In Game 7, the Red Sox blew out the Indians for the third straight time, this time by nine runs, to clinch the pennant.

The Red Sox returned to the ALCS the next year, but lost to the Tampa Bay Rays in seven games. They would win their next pennant in 2013 over the Detroit Tigers in six games en route to a World Series title.

The Indians would return to the ALCS in 2016, and defeated the Toronto Blue Jays in five games for their most recent pennant before falling in the World Series.

Both teams would meet again in the ALDS in 2016, which the Indians won in a sweep.

== National League Championship Series ==
=== (1) Arizona Diamondbacks vs. (4) Colorado Rockies ===
Colorado won the series, 4–0.

Game	Date	Score	Location	Time	Attendance
1	October 11	Colorado Rockies – 5, Arizona Diamondbacks – 1	Chase Field	3:12	48,142
2	October 12	Colorado Rockies – 3, Arizona Diamondbacks – 2 (11)	Chase Field	4:26	48,219
3	October 14	Arizona Diamondbacks – 1, Colorado Rockies – 4	Coors Field	3:04	50,137
4	October 15	Arizona Diamondbacks – 4, Colorado Rockies – 6	Coors Field	3:17	50,213

This was the first postseason meeting between the Diamondbacks and Rockies. The Rockies swept the top-seeded Diamondbacks to advance to the World Series for the first time in franchise history.

Jeff Francis pitched over six solid innings as the Rockies stole Game 1 in Phoenix. Game 1 was marred by a controversial call in the bottom of the seventh inning - Francis allowed a leadoff double to Chris Snyder and hit Justin Upton with a pitch, but the Diamondbacks were taken out of a potential rally when a disputed interference call resulted in a double-play groundout for Augie Ojeda. Diamondbacks fans responded by throwing objects onto the field, which stopped play. Game 2 remained tied after the regulation nine innings until the bottom of the eleventh, when Diamondbacks relief pitcher José Valverde loaded the bases and gave up a walk to put the Rockies in the lead for good, taking a 2-0 series lead headed to Denver. Home runs from Matt Holliday and Yorvit Torrealba would carry the Rockies to victory in Game 3. Holliday would again hit another three-run home run in Game 4 to give the Rockies a big lead that they would hold onto, as they clinched the pennant in front of their home fans.

By sweeping the series, the Rockies became the first team since the 1976 Cincinnati Reds to start 7–0 in the postseason. As of 2026, this is the only time the Rockies won the NL pennant.

The Diamondbacks would eventually return to the NLCS in 2023, where they defeated the Philadelphia Phillies in seven games before falling in the World Series.

Both teams would meet again in the Wild Card round in 2017, which was won by the Diamondbacks.

== 2007 World Series ==
=== (AL1) Boston Red Sox vs. (NL4) Colorado Rockies ===
Boston won the series, 4–0.

Game	Date	Score	Location	Time	Attendance
1	October 24	Colorado Rockies – 1, Boston Red Sox – 13	Fenway Park	3:30	36,733
2	October 25	Colorado Rockies – 1, Boston Red Sox – 2	Fenway Park	3:39	36,370
3	October 27	Boston Red Sox – 10, Colorado Rockies – 5	Coors Field	4:19	49,983
4	October 28	Boston Red Sox – 4, Colorado Rockies – 3	Coors Field	3:35	50,041

This was the sixth World Series in a row to feature a Wild Card team. The Red Sox handily swept the Rockies to win their second title in four years and seventh overall.

Entering the World Series, the Rockies had won 21 of their previous 22 games. After the Rockies swept the Diamondbacks, they had a break with eight days off.

The series was heavily lopsided in favor of the Red Sox - Josh Beckett pitched seven solid innings and gave up only one run as the Red Sox blew out the Rockies by a 13–1 score in Game 1. The Rockies took an early lead in Game 2, but the Red Sox put up two unanswered runs across the fourth and fifth innings to take the lead, and Curt Schilling and the Red Sox bullpen would keep the Rockies' offense at bay the rest of the game to go up 2–0 in the series headed to Denver. Game 2 would ultimately be Schilling’s final postseason game, as he would retire after the conclusion of the World Series. The Red Sox offense would once again explode in Game 3 as they won 10–5 to take a 3–0 series lead. The Sox would then clinch the title in Game 4 as Jonathan Papelbon fended off a late rally by the Rockies.

The Red Sox would return to the World Series in 2013, and defeated the St. Louis Cardinals in six games for their eighth championship.

As of 2026, this remains the last postseason appearance outside of the divisional round for the Rockies.

== Broadcasting ==
This was the first postseason under a seven-year U.S. rights agreement with Fox and TBS. TBS was awarded all Division Series games, the National League Championship Series in odd-numbered years starting in 2007, and the American League Championship Series in even-numbered years starting in 2008. Fox was awarded the American League Championship Series in odd-numbered years starting in 2007, and the National League Championship Series in even-numbered years starting in 2008. The deal also maintained Fox's streak of airing consecutive World Series since 2000.
