= 1981 Major League Baseball postseason =

1980 Major League Baseball playoffs

Tournament details
- Dates: October 6–28, 1981
- Teams: 8

Final positions
- Champions: Los Angeles Dodgers (5th title)
- Runners-up: New York Yankees

Tournament statistics
- Games played: 32
- Attendance: 1,527,224 (47,726 per game)
- Best BA: Gary Carter (.429 (Note: Minimum 20 plate appearances or 9 bases on balls.))
- Most HRs: Pedro Guerrero (LA) (4)
- Most SBs: Davey Lopes (LA) (10)
- Best ERA: Burt Hooton (0.82 (Note: Minimum 15 innings pitched or 3 games started in the postseason.))
- Most Ks (as pitcher): Fernando Valenzuela (LA) (26)

Awards
- MVP: Ron Cey, Pedro Guerrero, and Steve Yeager (LA)

The 1981 Major League Baseball postseason was the playoff tournament of Major League Baseball for the 1981 season. The season had a players' strike, which lasted from June 12 to July 31, and split the season into two halves. Teams that won their division in each half of the season advanced to the playoffs. Teams first faced each other in a League Division Series for the first time, a round of the postseason that did not return until 1995, where it became a permanent addition. The winners of the LDS moved on to the League Championship Series to determine the pennant winners that face each other in the World Series. This was the only postseason where MLB used a divisional-based playoff structure instead of a conference-based one.

In the American League, the New York Yankees and Kansas City Royals both made their fifth appearances in the past six years, the Oakland Athletics returned to the postseason for the first time since 1975, and the Milwaukee Brewers made their first postseason appearance in franchise history, and was only the first of two postseason appearances that the Brewers made during their time in the American League. This was the Yankees’ last postseason appearance until 1995.

In the National League, the Houston Astros made their second straight appearance, the Philadelphia Phillies returned for the fifth time in the past six years, the Los Angeles Dodgers made their fourth appearance in the past six years, and the Montreal Expos made their first postseason appearance in franchise history, and their only appearance during their time in Montreal, as the team did not return to the postseason again until 2012 after they moved to Washington, D.C. to become the Washington Nationals.

The postseason began on October 6, 1981, and ended on October 28, 1981, with the Dodgers defeating the Yankees in six games in the 1981 World Series. It was the fifth title for the Dodgers overall and their first since 1965.

== Teams ==
American League Teams National League Teams

Due to the strike-shortened season, the teams that finished first in their divisions during each half of the season qualified for the postseason. This was the last edition of the postseason to feature four teams per league until 1995 when the LDS was made a permanent addition to the format.

The following teams qualified for the postseason:

=== American League ===
- New York Yankees – 59–48, Clinched AL East (1st Half)
- Milwaukee Brewers – 62–47, Clinched AL East (2nd Half)
- Oakland Athletics – 64–45, Clinched AL West (1st Half)
- Kansas City Royals – 50–53, Clinched AL West (2nd half)

=== National League ===
- Philadelphia Phillies – 59–48, Clinched NL East (1st half)
- Montreal Expos – 60–48, Clinched NL East (2nd half)
- Los Angeles Dodgers – 63–47, Clinched NL West (1st half)
- Houston Astros – 61–49, Clinched NL West (2nd half)

== Playoff bracket ==
=== Bracket ===
Division Series (ALDS, NLDS)
E1	NY Yankees	3
E2	Milwaukee	2
American League
W1	Oakland	3
W2	Kansas City	0
E1	Philadelphia	2
E2	Montreal	3
National League
W1	Los Angeles	3
W2	Houston	2

League Championship Series (ALCS, NLCS)
E1	NY Yankees	3
W1	Oakland	0
E2	Montreal	2
W1	Los Angeles	3

World Series
ALE1	NY Yankees	2
NLW1	Los Angeles	4

NOTE: Due to the strike in mid-season, the season was divided into a first half and a second half. The division winner of the first half (denoted E1, W1) played the division winner of the second half (denoted E2, W2).

== American League Division Series ==
=== (W1) Oakland Athletics vs. (W2) Kansas City Royals ===
Oakland won the series, 3–0.

Game	Date	Score	Location	Time	Attendance
1	October 6	Oakland Athletics – 4, Kansas City Royals – 0	Royals Stadium	2:35	40,592
2	October 7	Oakland Athletics – 2, Kansas City Royals – 1	Royals Stadium	2:50	40,274
3	October 9	Kansas City Royals – 1, Oakland Athletics – 4	Oakland–Alameda County Coliseum	2:59	40,002

This was the first postseason meeting between the Athletics and Royals. The Athletics swept the defending American League champion Royals to return to the ALCS for the first time since 1975.

Mike Norris pitched a four-hit complete game shutout as the Athletics stole Game 1 on the road. In Game 2, Steve McCatty delivered another complete-game performance for the Athletics as they won 2–1 to go up 2–0 in the series headed to Oakland. In Game 3, a two-run homer from Dave McKay helped seal an Athletics victory as they completed the sweep to advance.

Both teams would meet again in the Wild Card Game in 2014, which the Royals won 9–8 in 12 innings before falling in the World Series that year.

=== (E1) New York Yankees vs. (E2) Milwaukee Brewers ===
New York won the series, 3–2.

Game	Date	Score	Location	Time	Attendance
1	October 7	New York Yankees – 5, Milwaukee Brewers – 3	County Stadium	2:57	35,064
2	October 8	New York Yankees – 3, Milwaukee Brewers – 0	County Stadium	2:20	26,395
3	October 9	Milwaukee Brewers – 5, New York Yankees – 3	Yankee Stadium	2:39	56,411
4	October 10	Milwaukee Brewers – 2, New York Yankees – 1	Yankee Stadium	2:34	52,077
5	October 11	Milwaukee Brewers – 3, New York Yankees – 7	Yankee Stadium	2:47	47,505

The Yankees fended off a late comeback by the Brewers to win the series in five games to advance to the ALCS for the second year in a row.

In Game 1, the Brewers jumped out to an early lead, but the Yankees put up four runs in the top of the fourth thanks to a two-run blast from Oscar Gamble and a two-run RBI double by Rick Cerone to take the lead for good and win. Dave Righetti pitched six innings of shutout ball and Goose Gossage got his second straight save as the Yankees won Game 2 by a 3–0 score to take a 2–0 series lead headed to the Bronx. In Game 3, a leadoff home run from Paul Molitor in the top of the eighth helped break a 3–3 tie and put the Brewers in the lead for good as they won their first postseason game in franchise history. Pete Vuckovich pitched five shutout innings and Rollie Fingers earned a save as the Brewers won to force a decisive fifth game. In Game 5, the Brewers jumped out to an early 2–0 lead, but like in Game 1, the Yankees put up four runs in the fourth to take the lead for good and advance, thanks to home runs from Gamble and Reggie Jackson.

The Brewers would return to the postseason the next year, defeating the California Angels in five games for their first league pennant after being nine outs away from elimination in Game 5. However, they fell in the World Series to the St. Louis Cardinals in seven games after being eleven outs away from the championship in Game 7.

== National League Division Series ==
=== (W1) Los Angeles Dodgers vs. (W2) Houston Astros ===
Los Angeles won the series, 3–2.

Game	Date	Score	Location	Time	Attendance
1	October 6	Los Angeles Dodgers – 1, Houston Astros – 3	Astrodome	2:22	44,836
2	October 7	Los Angeles Dodgers – 0, Houston Astros – 1 (11)	Astrodome	3:39	42,398
3	October 9	Houston Astros – 1, Los Angeles Dodgers – 6	Dodger Stadium	2:35	46,820
4	October 10	Houston Astros – 1, Los Angeles Dodgers – 2	Dodger Stadium	2:00	55,983
5	October 11	Houston Astros – 0, Los Angeles Dodgers – 4	Dodger Stadium	2:52	55,979

This was the first postseason meeting between the Dodgers and Astros. The Dodgers rallied from a two-games-to-none series hole to defeat the Astros in five games, and advanced to the NLCS for the fourth time in eight years.

Game 1 was a pitchers' duel between Houston's Nolan Ryan and Los Angeles' Dave Stewart, which was won by the former as the Astros won on a walk-off two-run home run from Alan Ashby. Game 2 was another pitchers' duel between both teams' bullpens that went into extra innings, and the Astros would prevail again as Denny Walling won the game for Houston with an RBI single to right field in the bottom of the eleventh. When the series shifted to Los Angeles, the Dodgers got on the board in Game 3, winning 6–1 to avoid a sweep. Game 4 was another pitchers duel, this time between the Dodgers' Fernando Valenzuela and the Astros' Vern Ruhle. Both pitched a complete game, but Valenzuela took the win as the Dodgers prevailed 2–1 to even the series. Game 5 was a pitchers' duel yet again, featuring Ryan for the Astros and Jerry Reuss for the Dodgers. Reuss won the duel as he pitched a five-hit complete game shutout as the Dodgers won 4–0.

In 2017, after joining the American League, the Astros would meet the Dodgers again in the 2017 World Series, which the Astros won in seven games for their first World Series title.

=== (E1) Philadelphia Phillies vs. (E2) Montreal Expos ===
Montreal won the series, 3–2.

Game	Date	Score	Location	Time	Attendance
1	October 7	Philadelphia Phillies – 1, Montreal Expos – 3	Olympic Stadium	2:30	34,237
2	October 8	Philadelphia Phillies – 1, Montreal Expos – 3	Olympic Stadium	2:31	45,896
3	October 9	Montreal Expos – 2, Philadelphia Phillies – 6	Veterans Stadium	2:45	36,835
4	October 10	Montreal Expos – 5, Philadelphia Phillies – 6 (10)	Veterans Stadium	2:48	38,818
5	October 11	Montreal Expos – 3, Philadelphia Phillies – 0	Veterans Stadium	2:15	47,384

This was the first postseason series played outside of the United States. In their only playoff series win in Quebec, Canada, the Expos defeated the defending World Series champion Phillies in five games to advance to the NLCS for the first time in franchise history.

In the first ever MLB postseason game played in Canada, Steve Rogers pitched eight solid innings as the Expos won their first postseason game in franchise history. Bill Gullickson and closer Jeff Reardon helped keep the Phillies' offense at bay in Game 2 as the Expos won 3–1, taking a 2–0 series lead headed to Philadelphia. In Game 3, the Phillies jumped out to a big lead and did not relinquish it, winning 6–2 to avoid a sweep. Game 4 was an offensive slugfest which the Phillies won in extra innings to even the series, capped off by a walk-off solo home run from George Vukovich. However, the Expos would ultimately prevail in Game 5, 3–0, as Rogers pitched a six-hit complete game shutout in the Expos' only playoff series win in Montreal.

The series is the only postseason matchup in the rivalry between the Phillies and Expos. This would also be the last playoff series won by the Expos/Nationals franchise until 2019, and the only playoff series won by a Canadian-based team until the Toronto Blue Jays won the American League pennant in 1992.

== American League Championship Series ==
=== (W1) Oakland Athletics vs. (E1) New York Yankees ===
New York won the series, 3–0.

Game	Date	Score	Location	Time	Attendance
1	October 13	Oakland Athletics – 1, New York Yankees – 3	Yankee Stadium (I)	2:52	55,740
2	October 14	Oakland Athletics – 3, New York Yankees – 13	Yankee Stadium (I)	3:08	48,497
3	October 15	New York Yankees – 4, Oakland Athletics – 0	Oakland-Alameda County Coliseum	3:19	47,302

This was the first postseason meeting between the Yankees and Athletics. The Yankees swept the Athletics to return to the World Series for the fourth time in six years (in the process denying a rematch of the 1974 World Series between the Athletics and Dodgers).

This ALCS was heavily lopsided in favor of the Yankees – the only close contest of the series was in Game 1, which the Yankees won 3–1 off a solid six-inning performance from Tommy John on the mound. The Yankees then blew out the Athletics in Game 2 by ten runs to take a 2–0 series lead headed to Oakland. The Yankees completed the sweep in Game 3 as Dave Righetti and closer Ron Davis shut down the Athletics' offense, winning 4–0. Game 3 was manager Billy Martin’s final postseason game, as he would pass away in a car accident in 1989.

After clinching the pennant in a sweep, the Yankees fell into a rare and unusual slump where they did not make the postseason again until 1995. The Yankees would eventually return to the ALCS in 1996, and defeated the Baltimore Orioles in five games en route to a World Series title.

The Athletics would return to the ALCS in 1988, and swept the Boston Red Sox before falling in the World Series.

Both teams would face each other again in the ALDS in 2000 and 2001, as well as the Wild Card Game in 2018, with all three being won by the Yankees.

== National League Championship Series ==
=== (E2) Montreal Expos vs. (W1) Los Angeles Dodgers ===
Los Angeles won the series, 3–2.

Game	Date	Score	Location	Time	Attendance
1	October 13	Montreal Expos – 1, Los Angeles Dodgers – 5	Dodger Stadium	2:47	51,273
2	October 14	Montreal Expos – 3, Los Angeles Dodgers – 0	Dodger Stadium	2:48	53,463
3	October 16	Los Angeles Dodgers – 1, Montreal Expos – 4	Olympic Stadium	2:27	54,372
4	October 17	Los Angeles Dodgers – 7, Montreal Expos – 1	Olympic Stadium	3:14	54,499
5	October 19	Los Angeles Dodgers – 2, Montreal Expos – 1	Olympic Stadium	2:41	36,491

This was the first NLCS since 1969 to not feature the Pittsburgh Pirates, Philadelphia Phillies, or Cincinnati Reds.

This was the first postseason meeting between the Dodgers and Expos. The Dodgers narrowly defeated the Expos in five games, returning to the World Series for the fourth time in eight years.

Burt Hooton pitched seven innings of shutout ball as the Dodgers took Game 1. Game 2 was a pitchers’ duel between Montreal’s Ray Burris and Los Angeles’ Fernando Valenzuela which was won by the former as Burris pitched a complete game shutout in an Expos victory in Game 2 to even the series headed to Montreal. In the first LCS game played in Canada, Steve Rogers pitched another complete game and a three-run homer from Jerry White in the bottom of the sixth secured an Expos victory in Game 3, now one win away from the World Series. However, it would be the Expos’ last playoff victory in Quebec. Hooton once again stymied the Expos’ offense in Game 4 as the Dodgers prevailed in a blowout win to force a decisive fifth game. In Game 5, Valenzuela would redeem himself on the mound as he pitched eight solid innings, only surrendering one run. With the game tied after eight, Expos manager Jim Fanning made the decision to retire Burris after eight innings and put in Rogers on relief duty on two-days rest. However, this decision proved to be fatal for the Expos. With two out in the top of the ninth, Rogers surrendered a go-ahead solo homer to Rick Monday that put the Dodgers in the lead for good, effectively securing the pennant in what became known as "Blue Monday" in Expos’ lore. Game 5 was the last postseason game ever played at Olympic Stadium.

This would be the last appearance in the NLCS by the Expos/Nationals franchise until 2019, where they swept the St. Louis Cardinals en route to the franchise's first World Series title (the Nationals also defeated the Dodgers in the NLDS during their World Series run that year).

The Dodgers would return to the NLCS two years later, but fell to the Philadelphia Phillies in four games. They would win their next pennant in 1988 over the New York Mets in seven games en route to another World Series title.

== 1981 World Series ==
=== (ALE1) New York Yankees vs. (NLW1) Los Angeles Dodgers ===
Los Angeles won the series, 4–2.

Game	Date	Score	Location	Time	Attendance
1	October 20	Los Angeles Dodgers – 3, New York Yankees – 5	Yankee Stadium	2:32	56,470
2	October 21	Los Angeles Dodgers – 0, New York Yankees – 3	Yankee Stadium	2:29	56,505
3	October 23	New York Yankees – 4, Los Angeles Dodgers – 5	Dodger Stadium	3:04	56,236
4	October 24	New York Yankees – 7, Los Angeles Dodgers – 8	Dodger Stadium	3:32	56,242
5	October 25	New York Yankees – 1, Los Angeles Dodgers – 2	Dodger Stadium	2:19	56,115
6	October 28†	Los Angeles Dodgers – 9, New York Yankees – 2	Yankee Stadium	3:09	56,513

†: postponed from October 27 due to rain

This was the eleventh World Series meeting in the history of the Dodgers–Yankees rivalry, and was the sixth New York–California matchup in the World Series (1962, 1963, 1973, 1977, 1978). This was the seventh meeting between teams from Los Angeles and New York City for a major professional sports championship. This previously occurred in three World Series (1963, 1977, 1978) and three NBA Finals (1970, 1972, 1973), and would be the last until the 2014 Stanley Cup Final.

The Dodgers rallied from a two-games-to-none series deficit to defeat the Yankees in six games, capturing their first World Series title since 1965. This series was a reverse of the 1978 World Series, which the Yankees won in six games after trailing two-games-to-none.

Ron Guidry pitched seven solid innings as the Yankees took Game 1. In Game 2, Tommy John pitched seven innings of shutout ball as the Yankees won 3-0 to take a 2–0 series lead headed to Los Angeles. In Game 3, the Yankees led 4-3 after four innings of play, putting the Dodgers in danger of falling behind three games to none, but the Dodgers rallied off RBI singles from Pedro Guerrero and Mike Scioscia in the bottom of the fifth that put them back in the lead for good, and Fernando Valenzuela earned a complete game victory in the process. Game 4 was a massive back-and-forth slugfest that was won by the Dodgers as they came from behind to even the series at two. In Game 5, the Yankees led 1-0 and were nine outs away from regaining the series lead, but they surrendered back-to-back solo homers to Guerrero and Steve Yeager in the bottom of the seventh as the Dodgers held on to take a 3–2 series lead headed back to the Bronx. In Game 6, the Dodgers blew out the Yankees in front of their home fans to secure the title.

The Dodgers were the last visiting team to win the World Series at Yankee Stadium until the Florida Marlins did so in 2003. The Dodgers would make one more appearance in the World Series later this decade in 1988, and upset the heavily favored Oakland Athletics in five games.

This would be the last postseason appearance by the Yankees until 1995, as the franchise entered a rare and unusual slump for the next fourteen seasons. They would return to the World Series in 1996, where they defeated the Atlanta Braves in six games to end an 18-year championship drought, marking the start of a dynasty for the franchise.

The Dodgers and Yankees would meet again 43 years later in the 2024 World Series, which was won by the Dodgers in five games, as they would clinch the title at Yankee Stadium in that series as well.

== Broadcasting ==
NBC televised both LCS nationally in the United States. Each team's local broadcaster also televised coverage of LCS games. ABC aired the World Series.
