= 1995 Major League Baseball postseason =

1995 Major League Baseball playoffs

Tournament details
- Dates: October 3–28, 1995
- Teams: 8

Final positions
- Champions: Atlanta Braves (3rd title)
- Runners-up: Cleveland Indians

Tournament statistics
- Games played: 31
- Most HRs: Ken Griffey Jr. (SEA) (6)
- Most SBs: Kenny Lofton (CLE) (11)
- Most Ks (as pitcher): Orel Hershiser (CLE) (35)

Awards
- MVP: Tom Glavine (ATL)

The 1995 Major League Baseball postseason was the playoff tournament of Major League Baseball for the 1995 season. This was the first postseason to be played under the expanded format, as the League Division Series (LDS) was played in both the American and National leagues for the first time since 1981, becoming a permanent fixture. The league was expanded to three divisions per league, and a new Wild Card berth was added. The next expansion would be in 2012 where another Wild Card berth would be added. The winners of the LDS moved on to the League Championship Series to determine the pennant winners that face each other in the World Series.

This was the first postseason to take place since the 1994–95 MLB strike.

In the American League, the New York Yankees returned to the postseason for the first time since 1981, and this was the first of thirteen consecutive appearances for the Yankees from 1995 to 2007. The Cleveland Indians ended four decades of futility and made their first postseason appearance since 1954, ending what was the longest postseason drought in the majors and all four major North American leagues. This was the first of five straight postseason appearances for the Indians. The Boston Red Sox made their fourth appearance in the past ten years, and the Seattle Mariners made the postseason for the first time in franchise history.

In the National League, the Atlanta Braves returned to the postseason for the fourth year in a row, the Los Angeles Dodgers made their first appearance since 1988, the Cincinnati Reds returned for the second time in five years, and the Colorado Rockies, just two years into their existence, made the postseason for the first time ever. This was Colorado’s last postseason appearance until 2007, and Cincinnati’s last appearance until 2010.

This was the last time until 2006 in which neither team from the previous World Series appeared in the postseason.

The postseason began on October 3, 1995, and ended on October 28, 1995, with the Braves defeating the Indians in six games to win their first championship since 1957, when the team was based out of Milwaukee. It was the Braves' third title in franchise history.

== Playoff seeds ==
American League Teams National League Teams

With each league being split into three divisions, the three division winners of each league automatically qualified for the postseason. The Wild Card was won by the team that posted the best record outside of the division winners.

The following teams qualified for the postseason:

=== American League ===
- Boston Red Sox – 86–58, AL East champions
- Cleveland Indians – 100–44, AL Central champions
- Seattle Mariners – 79–66, AL West champions
- New York Yankees – 79–65

Home-field advantage priority order: West, East, Central

=== National League ===
- Atlanta Braves – 90–54, NL East champions
- Cincinnati Reds – 85–59, NL Central champions
- Los Angeles Dodgers – 78–66, NL West champions
- Colorado Rockies – 77–67

Home-field advantage priority order: Central, East, West

== Playoff bracket ==
Division Series (ALDS, NLDS)
W	Seattle	3
WC	NY Yankees	2
American League
C	Cleveland	3
E	Boston	0
E	Atlanta	3
WC	Colorado	1
National League
C	Cincinnati	3
W	Los Angeles	0

League Championship Series (ALCS, NLCS)
W	Seattle	2
C	Cleveland	4
E	Atlanta	4
C	Cincinnati	0

World Series
AL	Cleveland	2
NL	Atlanta	4

== American League Division Series ==
=== Boston Red Sox vs. Cleveland Indians ===
Cleveland won the series, 3–0.

Game	Date	Score	Location	Time	Attendance
1	October 3	Boston Red Sox – 4, Cleveland Indians – 5 (13)	Jacobs Field	5:01	44,218
2	October 4	Boston Red Sox – 0, Cleveland Indians – 4	Jacobs Field	2:33	44,264
3	October 6	Cleveland Indians – 8, Boston Red Sox – 2	Fenway Park	3:18	34,211

This was the first postseason meeting between the Red Sox and Indians. The Indians swept the Red Sox to advance to their first ever ALCS.

Tony Peña would win Game 1 for the Indians with a walk-off home run in the bottom of the thirteenth. Orel Hershiser and the Cleveland bullpen kept the Red Sox offense silent in Game 2 as the Indians won 4–0 to take a 2–0 series lead headed to Fenway Park. The Indians then blew out the Red Sox in Game 3 to complete the sweep. This was the first playoff series win by the Indians since the 1948 World Series.

Both teams would meet again in the ALDS in 1998, 1999 and 2016, as well as the ALCS in 2007, with the Red Sox winning in 1999 and their 2007 championship season, and the Indians winning in 1998 and 2016.

=== Seattle Mariners vs. New York Yankees ===
Seattle won the series, 3–2.

Game	Date	Score	Location	Time	Attendance
1	October 3	Seattle Mariners – 6, New York Yankees – 9	Yankee Stadium (I)	3:38	57,178
2	October 4	Seattle Mariners – 5, New York Yankees – 7 (15)	Yankee Stadium (I)	5:12	57,126
3	October 6	New York Yankees – 4, Seattle Mariners – 7	Kingdome	3:04	57,944
4	October 7	New York Yankees – 8, Seattle Mariners – 11	Kingdome	4:08	57,180
5	October 8	New York Yankees – 5, Seattle Mariners – 6 (11)	Kingdome	4:19	57,411

This was the first postseason series ever played in the Pacific Northwest.

This was the first postseason meeting between the Mariners and Yankees. The Mariners overcame a two-games-to-none series deficit to defeat the Yankees in five games, advancing to the ALCS for the first time in franchise history.

In the first postseason series played in the Bronx in 14 years, the Yankees prevailed in an offensive slugfest in Game 1. Game 2 was a long and grueling extra-inning battle that was won by the Yankees thanks to a walk-off two-run home run from Jim Leyritz in the bottom of the fifteenth. When the series shifted to Seattle for Game 3, Tino Martinez’s two-run homer gave the Mariners a lead they would not relinquish as won their first playoff game in franchise history. Game 4 was a slugfest which the Mariners won thanks to home runs from Edgar Martinez, Jay Buhner and Ken Griffey Jr. to force a fifth game. In Game 5, the Mariners rallied in the bottom of the eighth inning to tie the game and send it into extra innings, which was then capped off by Edgar Martinez's series-winning double in the bottom of the eleventh, known as "The Double" in Mariners' baseball lore.

The Mariners and Yankees would meet again in the ALCS in 2000 and 2001, with the Yankees winning both series.

== National League Division Series ==
=== Atlanta Braves vs. Colorado Rockies ===
Atlanta won the series, 3–1.

Game	Date	Score	Location	Time	Attendance
1	October 3	Atlanta Braves – 5, Colorado Rockies – 4	Coors Field	3:19	50,040
2	October 4	Atlanta Braves – 7, Colorado Rockies – 4	Coors Field	3:08	50,063
3	October 6	Colorado Rockies – 7, Atlanta Braves – 5 (10)	Atlanta–Fulton County Stadium	3:16	51,300
4	October 7	Colorado Rockies – 4, Atlanta Braves – 10	Atlanta–Fulton County Stadium	2:38	50,027

This was the first postseason series ever played in the Mountain West region. The Braves defeated the Rockies in four games to advance to the NLCS for the fourth year in a row.

Chipper Jones won Game 1 on the road for the Braves with a solo home run in the top of the ninth. In Game 2, the Rockies led 4-3 going into the bottom of the ninth, but the Braves would take the lead and the Rockies surrendered two more runs thanks to an error by Eric Young Sr., which gave the Braves a 2–0 series lead headed back home. Young would redeem himself in Game 3, as he and Vinny Castilla hit a pair of home runs to give the Rockies their first playoff victory in franchise history. The Braves then closed out the series with a blowout win in Game 4.

This would be the last postseason appearance by the Rockies until 2007, where they went on a Cinderella run to the World Series before being swept by the Boston Red Sox.

=== Cincinnati Reds vs. Los Angeles Dodgers ===
Cincinnati won the series, 3–0.

Game	Date	Score	Location	Time	Attendance
1	October 3	Cincinnati Reds – 7, Los Angeles Dodgers – 2	Dodger Stadium	3:15	44,199
2	October 4	Cincinnati Reds – 5, Los Angeles Dodgers – 4	Dodger Stadium	3:21	46,051
3	October 6	Los Angeles Dodgers – 1, Cincinnati Reds – 10	Riverfront Stadium	3:27	53,276

This was the first postseason meeting between the Reds and Dodgers. The Reds swept the Dodgers to return to the NLCS for the second time in six years.

Pete Schourek and the Cincinnati bullpen kept the Dodger offense at bay in Game 1 as the Reds prevailed in a blowout win. Jeff Brantley ended a late rally by the Dodgers in Game 2 as the Reds held on to win 5–4 to take a 2–0 series lead headed back home. David Wells pitched six solid innings and the Reds’ offense overwhelmed National League Rookie of the Year Hideo Nomo in a blowout win in Game 3 to complete the sweep.

Both teams would meet again three decades later in the Wild Card round in 2025, where the Dodgers returned the favor and swept the Reds en route to a World Series title.

As of 2026, this is the last time the Reds won a playoff series, and they currently hold the longest playoff series win drought among the four major leagues.

== American League Championship Series ==
=== Seattle Mariners vs. Cleveland Indians ===
Cleveland won the series, 4–2.

Game	Date	Score	Location	Time	Attendance
1	October 10	Cleveland Indians – 2, Seattle Mariners – 3	Kingdome	3:07	57,065
2	October 11	Cleveland Indians – 5, Seattle Mariners – 2	Kingdome	3:14	58,144
3	October 13	Seattle Mariners – 5, Cleveland Indians – 2 (10)	Jacobs Field	3:18	43,643
4	October 14	Seattle Mariners – 0, Cleveland Indians – 7	Jacobs Field	3:30	43,686
5	October 15	Seattle Mariners – 2, Cleveland Indians – 3	Jacobs Field	3:37	43,607
6	October 17	Cleveland Indians – 4, Seattle Mariners – 0	Kingdome	2:54	58,489

This was the first postseason meeting between the Mariners and Indians. The Indians defeated the Mariners in six games to return to the World Series for the first time since 1954.

The Mariners took Game 1 thanks to an RBI double from Luis Sojo. Orel Hershiser pitched eight solid innings as the Indians evened the series in Game 2 heading to Cleveland. In the first ALCS game ever played in Cleveland, the Mariners won thanks to a three-run home run from Jay Buhner in the top of the tenth. Things then went south for the Mariners after the Game 3 win. Ken Hill pitched seven innings of shutout baseball as the Indians blew out the Mariners in Game 4 to even the series. Hershiser improved his postseason record to 7–0 in Game 5 as the Indians took a 3–2 series lead headed back to Seattle. Game 6 was a pitchers duel between Cleveland’s Dennis Martínez and Seattle’s Randy Johnson, which would be won by the former as the Indians won 4–0 to secure their first league pennant in 41 years.

This was the first of four consecutive losses in the ALCS for the Mariners. The Mariners returned to the ALCS in 2000 and 2001, but lost to the New York Yankees in six and five games respectively. They then made the ALCS a quarter century later in 2025, which they lost to the Toronto Blue Jays in seven games after being eight outs away from the pennant in Game 7, which is to date the closest the Mariners have come to winning a pennant.

The Indians would win the pennant again two years later over the Baltimore Orioles in six games before falling in the World Series again.

The Indians and Mariners would meet again in the ALDS in 2001, which was won by the Mariners.

As of 2026, this is the only time when both teams from Ohio appeared in the LCS.

== National League Championship Series ==
=== Cincinnati Reds vs. Atlanta Braves ===
Atlanta won the series, 4–0.

Game	Date	Score	Location	Time	Attendance
1	October 10	Atlanta Braves – 2, Cincinnati Reds – 1 (11)	Riverfront Stadium	3:18	40,382
2	October 11	Atlanta Braves – 6, Cincinnati Reds – 2 (10)	Riverfront Stadium	3:26	44,624
3	October 13	Cincinnati Reds – 2, Atlanta Braves – 5	Atlanta–Fulton County Stadium	2:42	51,424
4	October 14	Cincinnati Reds – 0, Atlanta Braves – 6	Atlanta–Fulton County Stadium	2:54	52,067

This was the first postseason meeting between the Braves and Reds. The Braves swept the Reds to return to the World Series for the third time in five years (in the process preventing an all-Ohio World Series from taking place).

In Game 1, the Reds took the lead in the fourth inning off an RBI single from Ron Gant, but lost it as David Justice scored a run to send the game into extra innings. Mike Devereaux then scored an RBI single in the top of the eleventh to put the Braves in the lead for good. Game 2 also went into extra innings as Lenny Harris hit an RBI single and Jeff Branson stole home plate to tie the game for the Reds. However, the Reds imploded yet again as in the top of the tenth, Mark Lemke stole home plate off a wild pitch, and Javy López hit a three-run home run to give the Braves a 6–2 victory headed to Atlanta. Game 2 was the last postseason game ever played at Riverfront Stadium, and remains the most recent NLCS game played in Cincinnati to date. Greg Maddux pitched eight solid innings in Game 3 as the Braves won 5–2 to go up three games to none. In Game 4, Steve Avery and the Braves’ bullpen silenced Cincinnati’s offense as the Braves won 6–0 to complete the sweep.

The Braves would return to the NLCS the next year, and defeated the St. Louis Cardinals in seven games after trailing 3–1 in the series, but would come up short in the World Series.

As of 2026, this is the Reds’ last postseason appearance outside of the divisional round, and the only time when both teams from Ohio appeared in the LCS.

The Reds and Braves would meet again in the Wild Card round in 2020, which the Braves also won in a sweep.

== 1995 World Series ==
=== Cleveland Indians (AL) vs. Atlanta Braves (NL) ===
Atlanta won the series, 4–2.

Game	Date	Score	Location	Time	Attendance
1	October 21	Cleveland Indians – 2, Atlanta Braves – 3	Atlanta–Fulton County Stadium	2:37	51,876
2	October 22	Cleveland Indians – 3, Atlanta Braves – 4	Atlanta–Fulton County Stadium	3:17	51,877
3	October 24	Atlanta Braves – 6, Cleveland Indians – 7 (11)	Jacobs Field	4:09	43,584
4	October 25	Atlanta Braves – 5, Cleveland Indians – 2	Jacobs Field	3:14	43,578
5	October 26	Atlanta Braves – 4, Cleveland Indians – 5	Jacobs Field	2:33	43,595
6	October 28	Cleveland Indians – 0, Atlanta Braves – 1	Atlanta–Fulton County Stadium	3:01	51,875

This was a rematch of the 1948 World Series, which the Indians won in six games over the then-Boston Braves. After two previous failed attempts, the Braves finally prevailed, upsetting the heavily favored Indians in six games to win their first title since 1957, when the team was based out of Milwaukee.

Greg Maddux put up a two-hit complete game performance as the Braves took Game 1, handing Orel Hershiser his first postseason loss ever. Tom Glavine and closer Mark Wohlers would once again stifle the Indians’ offense in Game 2 as the Braves took a 2–0 series lead headed to Cleveland. In the first World Series game played in Cleveland in 41 years, the Indians got on the board in the series after an extra-inning offensive shootout in Game 3, as Eddie Murray hit a walk-off RBI single in the bottom of the eleventh for the win. In Game 4, the Braves’ elite pitching would once again give the Indians trouble, as Steve Avery put in a solid six-inning performance on the mound in a 5-2 Atlanta win, giving the Braves a 3–1 series lead. Hershiser pitched eight solid innings and José Mesa would end a late rally by the Braves in Game 5 to send the series back to Atlanta. Game 5 was the last World Series game ever aired by ABC. In Game 6, Glavine pitched eight innings of shutout ball as the Braves prevailed 1–0, capped off by Atlanta's Marquis Grissom catching the final out in the top of the ninth. Game 6 was marred by controversy, due to an unusually wide strike zone that umpire Joe Brinkman gave Glavine, which resulted in complaints from the Indians’ players. This was the first professional sports championship ever won by an Atlanta-based team.

The Braves became the first team to beat both teams from Ohio in the postseason, as they previously defeated the Reds in the NLCS. They returned to the World Series the next year, but lost to the New York Yankees in six games. They would win their next title in 2021 against the Houston Astros in six games. As of 2026, this is the last time the Braves won the World Series at home.

This was the second of four consecutive losses in the World Series for the Indians dating back to the 1954 World Series. They would return to the World Series in 1997, but they would lose to the Florida Marlins in seven games after being one out away from the championship in Game 7. The Indians also returned to the Fall Classic in 2016, where they blew a 3–1 series lead to the Chicago Cubs, who won their first championship in 108 years.

== Broadcasting ==
This was the only postseason in which telecasts were produced by The Baseball Network, the broadcasting joint venture between ABC, NBC and Major League Baseball that began in the 1994 season. Under the original plan, NBC was supposed to air both League Championship Series in even-numbered years while ABC would have all four Division Series and the World Series. Then in odd-numbered years, ABC was supposed to air both League Championship Series while NBC would have all four Division Series and the World Series. After the 1994–95 MLB strike forced the cancellation of the 1994 postseason and delayed the start of the 1995 regular season, both networks elected to dissolve the partnership with MLB on June 22, 1995. To salvage the remains of the partnership, ABC and NBC elected to share coverage of the 1995 postseason including the World Series.

The Baseball Network still kept its original plan that not all postseason games (aside from the World Series) were guaranteed to be shown nationally. To increase viewership by preventing games from being played in the afternoon (the league was the only professional sports league in the country to play postseason games on weekday afternoons), the National League and American League's Division and Championship Series games were instead played simultaneously in primetime, and affiliates could only air one game each night, which were again determined regionally. If one playoff series had already concluded, the remaining games would be aired nationally. For example, Games 1 and 2 of all four Division Series were aired regionally on NBC on October 3–4 before ABC televised Games 3 and 4 on October 6–7. Likewise, Games 1 and 2 of both LCS were regionally televised on ABC on October 10–11 before NBC aired Games 3 and 4 on October 13–14. ABC then had Games 1, 4, and 5 of World Series while NBC aired Games 2, 3, and 6. Had the World Series gone to a seventh game, it would have then been broadcast by ABC.
