= 2006 Major League Baseball postseason =

2006 Major League Baseball playoffs

Tournament details
- Dates: October 3–27, 2006
- Teams: 8
- Defending champions: Chicago White Sox

Final positions
- Champions: St. Louis Cardinals (10th title)
- Runners-up: Detroit Tigers

Tournament statistics
- Most HRs: Craig Monroe (DET) (5)
- Most SBs: David Eckstein (STL) (4)
- Most Ks (as pitcher): Chris Carpenter (STL) & Justin Verlander (DET) (23)

Awards
- MVP: David Eckstein (STL)

The 2006 Major League Baseball postseason was the playoff tournament of Major League Baseball for the 2006 season. The winners of the League Division Series would move on to the League Championship Series to determine the pennant winners that face each other in the World Series.

In the American League, the New York Yankees made their twelfth straight postseason appearance, the Minnesota Twins returned for the fourth time in five years, the Oakland Athletics returned for the fourth time in seven years, and the Detroit Tigers ended almost two decades of futility by clinching their first postseason berth since 1987.

In the National League, the St. Louis Cardinals returned for the third straight year, the New York Mets returned for the first time in six years, the Los Angeles Dodgers returned for the second time in three years, and the San Diego Padres made their second straight postseason appearance. This would be San Diego's last postseason appearance until 2020, and as of 2026, their most recent postseason appearance as a division champion.

This was the first postseason since 1990 not to feature the Atlanta Braves, who had previously made fourteen straight appearances from 1991 to 2005 (excluding 1994, when the season was cancelled due to a strike). It was also the first time since 1995 in which neither team from the previous year's World Series appeared in the postseason. This phenomenon would only occur twice since - in the next season and in 2024.

The postseason began on October 3, 2006, and ended on October 27, 2006, with the 83-win underdog Cardinals upsetting the heavily favored Tigers in five games in the 2006 World Series. It was the Cardinals' first title since 1982 and their tenth overall. The Cardinals became the first National League team to win ten or more World Series championships and the second team to do so in MLB overall, joining the New York Yankees.

This was the second edition of the postseason since 2002 to have no extra-inning games.

== Playoff seeds ==
American League Teams National League Teams

The following teams qualified for the postseason:

=== American League ===
1. New York Yankees – 97–65, AL East champions
2. Minnesota Twins – 96–66, AL Central champions
3. Oakland Athletics – 93–69, AL West champions
4. Detroit Tigers – 95–67

=== National League ===
1. New York Mets – 97–65, NL East champions
2. San Diego Padres – 88–74, NL West champions (13–5 head-to-head record vs. LAD)
3. St. Louis Cardinals – 83–78, NL Central champions
4. Los Angeles Dodgers – 88–74 (5–13 head-to-head record vs. SD)

== Playoff bracket ==
Division Series (ALDS, NLDS)
1	NY Yankees	1
4	Detroit	3
American League
2	Minnesota	0
3	Oakland	3
1	NY Mets	3
4	LA Dodgers	0
National League
2	San Diego	1
3	St. Louis	3

League Championship Series (NLCS, ALCS)
4	Detroit	4
3	Oakland	0
1	NY Mets	3
3	St. Louis	4

World Series
AL4	Detroit	1
NL3	St. Louis	4

== American League Division Series ==
=== (1) New York Yankees vs. (4) Detroit Tigers ===
Detroit won the series, 3–1.

Game	Date	Score	Location	Time	Attendance
1	October 3	Detroit Tigers – 4, New York Yankees – 8	Yankee Stadium (I)	3:14	56,291
2	October 5†	Detroit Tigers – 4, New York Yankees – 3	Yankee Stadium (I)	3:15	56,252
3	October 6	New York Yankees – 0, Detroit Tigers – 6	Comerica Park	3:05	43,440
4	October 7	New York Yankees – 3, Detroit Tigers – 8	Comerica Park	2:54	43,126

†: Game was postponed due to rain on October 4

This was the first postseason meeting between the Tigers and Yankees. The Tigers defeated the Yankees in four games to advance to the ALCS for the first time since 1987.

Chien-Ming Wang pitched six solid innings and home runs from Jason Giambi and Derek Jeter would help secure a Game 1 victory for the Yankees. In Game 2, the Yankees held an early 3–1 lead thanks to a three-run homer from Johnny Damon in the bottom of the fourth, but the Tigers would put up three unanswered runs across the next three innings to take the lead for good, capped off by an RBI triple from Curtis Granderson in the top of the seventh that scored Marcus Thames. When the series shifted to Detroit for Game 3, Kenny Rogers pitched pitched 7 2/3 innings of shutout ball as the Tigers shut out the Yankees 6–0 to take a 2–1 series lead. Game 3 was Randy Johnson’s final postseason game. In Game 4, home runs from Magglio Ordóñez and Craig Monroe would ignite the Tigers’ offense as they blew out the Yankees to advance to the ALCS. This was the first playoff series win by the Tigers since the 1984 World Series.

The Tigers and Yankees would meet in the postseason twice more, in the ALDS in 2011 and the ALCS in 2012, both of which were won by the Tigers.

=== (2) Minnesota Twins vs. (3) Oakland Athletics ===
Oakland won the series, 3–0.

Game	Date	Score	Location	Time	Attendance
1	October 3	Oakland Athletics – 3, Minnesota Twins – 2	Hubert H. Humphrey Metrodome	2:19	55,542
2	October 4	Oakland Athletics – 5, Minnesota Twins – 2	Hubert H. Humphrey Metrodome	3:02	55,710
3	October 6	Minnesota Twins – 3, Oakland Athletics – 8	McAfee Coliseum	2:55	35,694

This was the second postseason meeting between the Athletics and Twins. They previously met in the ALDS in 2002, which was won by the Twins. The Athletics swept the Twins to return to the ALCS for the first time since 1992.

Barry Zito pitched seven solid innings as the Athletics stole Game 1 in Minneapolis. Mark Kotsay hit a rare inside-the-park home run in a 5-2 Athletics victory in Game 2 to go up 2–0 on the series headed back home. In Game 3, the Athletics blew out the Twins to complete the sweep.

This was the Athletics’ first playoff victory since winning the American League pennant in 1990. It was also the last time the Athletics won a playoff series until 2020, which would ultimately be their last during their time in Oakland, as the team would move to Las Vegas.

== National League Division Series ==
=== (1) New York Mets vs. (4) Los Angeles Dodgers ===
New York won the series, 3–0.

Game	Date	Score	Location	Time	Attendance
1	October 4	Los Angeles Dodgers – 5, New York Mets – 6	Shea Stadium	3:05	56,979
2	October 5	Los Angeles Dodgers – 1, New York Mets – 4	Shea Stadium	2:57	57,029
3	October 7	New York Mets – 9, Los Angeles Dodgers – 5	Dodger Stadium	3:51	56,293

This was the second postseason meeting between the Mets and Dodgers. They last met in the NLCS in 1988, which was won by the Dodgers in seven games en route to a World Series title. This time, the Mets returned the favor, sweeping the Dodgers to return to the NLCS for the third time in seven years.

The Mets prevailed in an offensive slugfest in Game 1. Tom Glavine pitched six innings of shutout ball as the Mets won 4–1 to take a 2–0 series lead heading to Los Angeles. Game 3 was yet another slugfest that was won by the Mets as they completed the sweep.

Both teams would meet again in the NLDS in 2015 and the NLCS in 2024, with the Mets winning the former before falling n the World Series, and the Dodgers winning the latter en route to a World Series title.

=== (2) San Diego Padres vs. (3) St. Louis Cardinals ===
St. Louis won the series, 3–1.

Game	Date	Score	Location	Time	Attendance
1	October 3	St. Louis Cardinals – 5, San Diego Padres – 1	Petco Park	2:54	43,107
2	October 5	St. Louis Cardinals – 2, San Diego Padres – 0	Petco Park	2:54	43,463
3	October 7	San Diego Padres – 3, St. Louis Cardinals – 1	Busch Stadium (III)	3:33	46,634
4	October 8	San Diego Padres – 2, St. Louis Cardinals – 6	Busch Stadium (III)	2:44	46,476

In the third postseason meeting between these two teams, the Cardinals once again defeated the Padres, this time in four games, to return to the NLCS for the third straight time.

Chris Carpenter pitched six solid innings and Albert Pujols’ two-run homer in the fourth gave the Cardinals a lead they wouldn’t relinquish as they took Game 1. Jeff Weaver and four other relievers helped shut out the Padres in Game 2 to go up 2–0 in the series headed back home. In St. Louis, the Padres won Game 3 by a 3–1 score despite leaving 14 runners on base. However, Carpenter and Adam Wainwright would shut down the Padres' offense in Game 4 as the Cardinals won 6–2 to advance to the NLCS.

Both teams would meet again during the Wild Card round in 2020, and in that series the Padres would prevail.

== American League Championship Series ==
=== (3) Oakland Athletics vs. (4) Detroit Tigers ===
Detroit won the series, 4–0.

Game	Date	Score	Location	Time	Attendance
1	October 10	Detroit Tigers – 5, Oakland Athletics – 1	McAfee Coliseum	3:20	35,655
2	October 11	Detroit Tigers – 8, Oakland Athletics – 5	McAfee Coliseum	3:06	36,168
3	October 13	Oakland Athletics – 0, Detroit Tigers – 3	Comerica Park	2:57	41,669
4	October 14	Oakland Athletics – 3, Detroit Tigers – 6	Comerica Park	3:23	42,967

This was the first ALCS since 1990 to not feature either the New York Yankees, Cleveland Indians, Seattle Mariners, Toronto Blue Jays, Chicago White Sox or Minnesota Twins.

This was a rematch of the 1972 ALCS, which the Athletics won in five games en route to a World Series title. The Tigers swept the Athletics to advance to the World Series for the first time since 1984 (in the process denying a rematch of the 1931 World Series between the Athletics and Cardinals).

Nate Robertson and the Tigers’ bullpen held the A's offense to one run as the Tigers took Game 1. In Game 2, Justin Verlander won his first postseason game as the Tigers prevailed to take a 2–0 series lead headed to Detroit. In Game 3, Kenny Rogers pitched seven innings of shutout ball as the Tigers blanked the A's to take a commanding three games to none series lead. In Game 4, the Athletics took a 3–0 lead after the fourth, but the Tigers put up six unanswered runs, capped off by a walk-off three-run home run by Magglio Ordóñez in the bottom of the ninth inning, to complete the sweep.

As of 2026, this is the last postseason appearance outside of the divisional round for the Athletics, and their final ALCS appearance during their time in Oakland, as the team would move to Las Vegas after the 2024 season.

The Tigers returned to the ALCS in 2011, but lost to the Texas Rangers in six games. They would win their next and most recent pennant in 2012 in a sweep over the New York Yankees before falling in the World Series.

The Tigers and Athletics would meet two more times in the postseason, in the ALDS in 2012 and 2013, both won by the Tigers in five games.

== National League Championship Series ==
=== (1) New York Mets vs. (3) St. Louis Cardinals ===
St. Louis won the series, 4–3.

Game	Date	Score	Location	Time	Attendance
1	October 12†	St. Louis Cardinals – 0, New York Mets – 2	Shea Stadium	2:52	56,311
2	October 13†	St. Louis Cardinals – 9, New York Mets – 6	Shea Stadium	3:58	56,349
3	October 14	New York Mets – 0, St. Louis Cardinals – 5	Busch Stadium	2:53	47,053
4	October 15	New York Mets – 12, St. Louis Cardinals – 5	Busch Stadium	3:31	46,600
5	October 17‡	New York Mets – 2, St. Louis Cardinals – 4	Busch Stadium	3:26	46,496
6	October 18	St. Louis Cardinals – 2, New York Mets – 4	Shea Stadium	2:56	56,334
7	October 19	St. Louis Cardinals – 3, New York Mets – 1	Shea Stadium	3:23	56,357

†: Game 1 was postponed due to rain on October 11. Game 2 was subsequently pushed back a day as well.
‡: Game 5 was postponed due to rain on October 16.

This was a rematch of the 2000 NLCS, which the Mets won in five games before coming up short in the World Series. In a significant upset given their regular season win differential, the 83-win Cardinals defeated the heavily favored 97-win Mets in seven games to return to the World Series for the second time in three years.

Tom Glavine pitched seven innings of shutout baseball in Game 1 as the Mets won 2–0. Game 2 was an offensive slugfest which the Cardinals won to even the series headed to St. Louis, thanks to home runs from Jim Edmonds and So Taguchi. In Game 3, Jeff Suppan pitched eight shutout innings as the Cardinals won 5–0 to go up 2–1 in the series. In Game 4, Carlos Beltrán, David Wright, and Carlos Delgado all homered for the Mets as they blew out the Cardinals to even the series at two. In Game 5, the Mets went up 2–0 early, but the Cardinals responded with four unanswered runs to win and take a 3–2 series lead headed back to Queens. Game 5 was Glavine’s final postseason game. The Mets jumped out in the lead early and their bullpen held off a late rally by the Cardinals to force a seventh game. Game 7 remained tied at one until a two-run home run by Yadier Molina in the top of the ninth put the Cardinals in the lead for good, and then Adam Wainwright got the Cards out of a bases-loaded jam in the bottom of the ninth to secure the pennant. Game 7 was the last postseason game ever played at Shea Stadium.

The Cardinals’ 83-wins was the second lowest of any pennant winner in MLB history, and became the third team to win a league pennant with 85 or fewer wins. The only team to win the pennant with fewer regular season wins were the Mets themselves, who won the 1973 NL pennant with only 82 wins. The Cardinals would win their next pennant in 2011 over the Milwaukee Brewers in six games en route to another World Series title.

The Mets would return to the NLCS in 2015, where they swept the Chicago Cubs before falling in the World Series.

== 2006 World Series ==
=== (AL4) Detroit Tigers vs. (NL3) St. Louis Cardinals ===
St. Louis won the series, 4–1.

Game	Date	Score	Location	Time	Attendance
1	October 21	St. Louis Cardinals – 7, Detroit Tigers – 2	Comerica Park	2:54	42,479
2	October 22	St. Louis Cardinals – 1, Detroit Tigers – 3	Comerica Park	2:55	42,533
3	October 24	Detroit Tigers – 0, St. Louis Cardinals – 5	Busch Stadium (III)	3:03	46,513
4	October 26†	Detroit Tigers – 4, St. Louis Cardinals – 5	Busch Stadium (III)	3:35	46,470
5	October 27†	Detroit Tigers – 2, St. Louis Cardinals – 4	Busch Stadium (III)	2:56	46,638

†: Game 4 was postponed due to rain on October 25, forcing Game 5 to be subsequently pushed back a day as well.

This was the third World Series matchup between the Tigers and Cardinals. They had previously met in 1934 and 1968, with the Cardinals winning the former and the Tigers winning the latter. In a significant upset given their regular season win differential, the 83-win Cardinals upset the heavily favored 95-win Tigers in five games to win their first title since 1982.

In the first World Series game in Detroit in 22 years, the Cardinals stunned the Comerica Park crowd in a blowout win, as Anthony Reyes had a solid eight-inning performance on the mound. In Game 2, the Tigers jumped out to an early lead in the bottom of the first thanks to a home run from Craig Monroe and RBI from Carlos Guillén and maintained it to even the series headed to St. Louis. Game 2 was marred by controversy, as Tigers’ starting pitcher Kenny Rogers was suspected for using pine tar. Rogers claimed it was a combination of dirt and rosin (both legal), but complied with umpire requests to wash his hands. Chris Carpenter pitched eight innings of shutout ball as the Cardinals won Game 3 by a 5–0 score to regain the series lead. In Game 4, the Tigers lead 3–2 after the fourth thanks to a solo home run from Sean Casey and RBIs from Casey and Iván "Pudge" Rodríguez. However, the Cardinals took the lead in the bottom of the seventh thanks to a sacrifice bunt from So Taguchi and an RBI single from Preston Wilson. The Tigers tied the game in the top of the eighth off an RBI double from Brandon Inge, but the Cardinals took the lead for good in the bottom of the inning off an RBI double from David Eckstein to take a 3–1 series lead. In Game 5, the Tigers took the lead in the top of the fourth off a two-run homer from Casey, but the Cardinals scored three unanswered runs to take the lead for good and secure the title, completing an improbable upset.

This was the Tigers’ first loss in the World Series since 1940. Previously, they had won the title in their last three appearances in 1945, 1968, and 1984. The Tigers would return to the World Series in 2012, but were swept by the San Francisco Giants, becoming the second victim of the Giants’ dynasty of three titles in five years from 2010 to 2014.

With their tenth championship, the Cardinals became the first National League team to win ten or more World Series championships, and the second MLB team to do so overall, joining the New York Yankees. The Cardinals’ 24-year drought between championships was the longest for the franchise, surpassing the previous record of 22 years between championships from 1946 to 1964. The 2006 Cardinals’ 83-wins remain the fewest of any World Series team in MLB history, and they became just the second team to win the World Series with 85 or fewer wins, joining the 1987 Minnesota Twins (the Twins, ironically, defeated the Cardinals in the World Series that season, and had also defeated the Tigers in the postseason en route to the championship, in the ALCS). The Cardinals would return to the World Series again in 2011, and defeated the Texas Rangers in seven games to win their most recent title after being a strike away from elimination twice in Game 6.

== Broadcasting ==
This was the fourth and final year that Division Series games aired across ESPN, ESPN2, and Fox. Fox then aired both League Championship Series and the World Series. MLB would then sign new deals with Fox and TBS to split postseason coverage.
