= 2026 World Baseball Classic Pool A =

Pool A of the 2026 World Baseball Classic (branded as the World Baseball Classic 2026 San Juan Discover Puerto Rico for sponsorship reasons) took place from March 6 to 11, 2026, at Hiram Bithorn Stadium in San Juan, Puerto Rico. The first of four pools, the top two teams automatically qualified for the top-eight knockout stage, beginning with quarterfinals in Houston and Miami, United States.

The group consisted of Puerto Rico (co-host), Cuba, Canada, Panama, and Colombia. Canada clinched a spot in the quarterfinals in the final game of the pool by defeating Cuba, and secured the top seed by previously defeating the runner-up Puerto Rico. This marked the first instance of Canada advancing past the first round of the WBC, as well as the first time Cuba failed to advance. Panama was relegated on tiebreakers by losing to Colombia by a single run and must re-qualify for the next edition of the tournament.

== Teams ==
Draw position	Team	Pot	Confederation	Method of qualification	Date of qualification	Finals appearance	Last appearance	Previous best performance	WBSC Rankings
B1	Puerto Rico	1	WBSC Americas	Hosts + 2023 participants	March 8, 2023	6th	2023	Runners-up (2013, 2017)	7
B2	Cuba	3	WBSC Americas	2023 participants	March 8, 2023	6th	2023	Runners-up (2006)	10
B3	Canada	4	WBSC Americas	2023 participants	March 8, 2023	6th	2023	Pool stage (2006, 2009, 2013, 2017, 2023)	20
B4	Panama	2	WBSC Americas	2023 participants	March 8, 2023	4th	2023	Pool stage (2006, 2009, 2023)	8
B5	Colombia	5	WBSC Americas	Qualifiers Pool B winner	March 4, 2025	3rd	2023	Pool stage (2017, 2023)	13

== Standings ==
Pos	Team	Pld	W	L	RF	RA	PCT	GB	Qualification
1	Canada	4	3	1	21	10	.750 (Note: Canada defeated Puerto Rico, 3–2)	—	Advance to knockout stage
2	Puerto Rico (H)	4	3	1	15	7	.750	—	Advance to knockout stage
3	Cuba	4	2	2	13	16	.500	1	
4	Colombia	4	1	3	10	23	.250 (Note: Colombia defeated Panama, 4–3)	2	
5	Panama	4	1	3	11	14	.250	2	Requalification required for next WBC

Source: MLB
(H) Hosts

== Summary ==
Date	Local time	Road team	Score	Home team	Inn.	Venue	Game duration	Attendance	Boxscore
Mar 6, 2026	12:00 AST	Cuba	3–1	Panama		Hiram Bithorn Stadium	2:38	10,015	Boxscore
Mar 6, 2026	19:00 AST	Puerto Rico	5–0	Colombia		Hiram Bithorn Stadium	2:55	18,793	Boxscore
Mar 7, 2026	12:00 AST	Colombia	2–8	Canada		Hiram Bithorn Stadium	3:08	10,293	Boxscore
Mar 7, 2026	19:00 AST	Panama	3–4	Puerto Rico	10	Hiram Bithorn Stadium	3:26 (+0:24 delay)	18,925	Boxscore
Mar 8, 2026	12:00 AST	Colombia	4–7	Cuba		Hiram Bithorn Stadium	2:47	10,957	Boxscore
Mar 8, 2026	19:00 AST	Panama	4–3	Canada		Hiram Bithorn Stadium	3:08 (+1:25 delay)	15,649	Boxscore
Mar 9, 2026	12:00 AST	Colombia	4–3	Panama		Hiram Bithorn Stadium	3:15	9,790	Boxscore
Mar 9, 2026	19:00 AST	Cuba	1–4	Puerto Rico		Hiram Bithorn Stadium	2:53 (+1:13 delay)	19,189	Boxscore
Mar 10, 2026	19:00 AST	Canada	3–2	Puerto Rico		Hiram Bithorn Stadium	2:54 (+1:09 delay)	18,997	Boxscore
Mar 11, 2026	15:00 AST	Canada	7–2	Cuba		Hiram Bithorn Stadium	3:09	10,610	Boxscore

== Games ==
=== Cuba vs. Panama ===
March 6, 2026 12:00 PM AST at Hiram Bithorn Stadium in San Juan, Puerto Rico
Team	1	2	3	4	5	6	7	8	9	R	H	E
Cuba	0	1	2	0	0	0	0	0	0	3	5	1
Panama	0	0	0	0	0	0	1	0	0	1	5	0
WP: Liván Moinelo (1–0) LP: Logan Allen (0–1) Sv: Raidel Martínez (1); Home runs: CUB: Yoelquis Guibert (1), Yoán Moncada (1); PAN: None; Attendance: 10,015; Umpires: HP – Tomoya Ishiyama, 1B – Tripp Gibson, 2B – Nestor Ceja, 3B – Chang Chan-jung; Boxscore

=== Puerto Rico vs. Colombia ===
March 6, 2026 7:00 PM AST at Hiram Bithorn Stadium in San Juan, Puerto Rico
Team	1	2	3	4	5	6	7	8	9	R	H	E
Puerto Rico	0	0	0	0	5	0	0	0	0	5	5	0
Colombia	0	0	0	0	0	0	0	0	0	0	6	1
WP: Seth Lugo (1–0) LP: Adrián Almeida (0–1); Attendance: 18,793; Umpires: HP – Alex MacKay, 1B – Mario Villavicencio, 2B – Junior Valentine, 3B – Domingo Paulino; Boxscore

=== Colombia vs. Canada ===
March 7, 2026 12:00 PM AST at Hiram Bithorn Stadium in San Juan, Puerto Rico
Team	1	2	3	4	5	6	7	8	9	R	H	E
Colombia	0	0	1	0	0	0	0	1	0	2	6	2
Canada	0	2	1	0	0	0	1	4	X	8	8	1
WP: Michael Soroka (1–0) LP: Austin Bergner (0–1); Home runs: COL: None; CAN: Owen Caissie (1); Attendance: 10,293; Umpires: HP – Junior Valentine, 1B – Tomoya Ishiyama, 2B – Vic Carapazza, 3B – Mario Villavicencio; Boxscore

=== Panama vs. Puerto Rico ===
March 7, 2026 7:00 PM AST at Hiram Bithorn Stadium in San Juan, Puerto Rico
Team	1	2	3	4	5	6	7	8	9	10	R	H	E
Panama	0	0	0	2	0	0	0	0	0	1	3	6	0
Puerto Rico	0	0	0	0	1	0	0	0	1	2	4	10	1
WP: Jose Espada (1–0) LP: Severino González (0–1); Home runs: PAN: None; PUR: Darell Hernaiz (1); Attendance: 18,925; Umpires: HP – Laz Diaz, 1B – Alex MacKay, 2B – Domingo Paulino, 3B – Chang Chan-jung; Boxscore

=== Colombia vs. Cuba ===
March 8, 2026 12:00 PM AST at Hiram Bithorn Stadium in San Juan, Puerto Rico
Team	1	2	3	4	5	6	7	8	9	R	H	E
Colombia	1	0	0	0	0	1	2	0	0	4	7	1
Cuba	4	0	0	0	0	3	0	0	X	7	8	1
WP: Denny Larrondo (1–0) LP: Luis Patiño (0–1) Sv: Raidel Martínez (2); Home runs: COL: None; CUB: Ariel Martínez (1), Erisbel Arruebarrena (1); Attendance: 10,957; Umpires: HP – Tripp Gibson, 1B – Laz Diaz, 2B – Chang Chan-jung, 3B – Mario Villavicencio; Boxscore

=== Panama vs. Canada ===
March 8, 2026 7:00 PM AST at Hiram Bithorn Stadium in San Juan, Puerto Rico
Team	1	2	3	4	5	6	7	8	9	R	H	E
Panama	0	0	0	1	0	3	0	0	0	4	11	1
Canada	0	1	0	1	0	0	0	1	0	3	9	3
WP: Miguel Cienfuegos (1–0) LP: James Paxton (0–1) Sv: Darío Agrazal (1); Attendance: 15,649; Umpires: HP – Nestor Ceja, 1B – Vic Carapazza, 2B – Domingo Paulino, 3B – Tomoya Ishiyama; Boxscore

=== Colombia vs. Panama ===
March 9, 2026 12:00 PM AST at Hiram Bithorn Stadium in San Juan, Puerto Rico
Team	1	2	3	4	5	6	7	8	9	R	H	E
Colombia	0	0	0	0	0	4	0	0	0	4	4	1
Panama	0	0	0	0	0	1	0	2	0	3	7	0
WP: Austin Bergner (1–1) LP: Jorge García (0–1) Sv: Pedro García (1); Home runs: COL: None; PAN: José Caballero (1); Attendance: 9,790; Umpires: HP – Chang Chan-jung, 1B – Nestor Ceja, 2B – Alex MacKay, 3B – Mario Villavicencio; Boxscore

=== Cuba vs. Puerto Rico ===
March 9, 2026 7:00 PM AST at Hiram Bithorn Stadium in San Juan, Puerto Rico
Team	1	2	3	4	5	6	7	8	9	R	H	E
Cuba	0	0	0	0	0	1	0	0	0	1	2	1
Puerto Rico	0	3	0	0	1	0	0	0	X	4	6	1
WP: Elmer Rodríguez (1–0) LP: Julio Robaina (0–1) Sv: Edwin Díaz (1); Attendance: 19,189; Umpires: HP – Vic Carapazza, 1B – Domingo Paulino, 2B – Tripp Gibson, 3B – Tomoya Ishiyama; Boxscore

=== Canada vs. Puerto Rico ===
March 10, 2026 7:00 PM AST at Hiram Bithorn Stadium in San Juan, Puerto Rico
Team	1	2	3	4	5	6	7	8	9	R	H	E
Canada	0	0	2	1	0	0	0	0	0	3	5	0
Puerto Rico	1	0	0	1	0	0	0	0	0	2	5	0
WP: Jordan Balazovic (1–0) LP: José De León (0–1) Sv: Brock Dykxhoorn (1); Attendance: 18,997; Umpires: HP – Alex MacKay, 1B – Laz Diaz, 2B – Mario Villavicencio, 3B – Domingo Paulino; Boxscore

=== Canada vs. Cuba ===
March 11, 2026 3:00 PM AST at Hiram Bithorn Stadium in San Juan, Puerto Rico
Team	1	2	3	4	5	6	7	8	9	R	H	E
Canada	0	0	1	0	1	3	0	1	1	7	11	2
Cuba	0	0	0	0	1	1	0	0	0	2	5	3
WP: Cal Quantrill (1–0) LP: Livan Moinelo (1–1); Home runs: CAN: Abraham Toro (1); CUB: None; Attendance: 10,610; Umpires: HP – Tripp Gibson, 1B – Chan-Jung Chang, 2B – Tomoya Ishiyama, 3B – Nestor Ceja; Boxscore

== Statistics ==
=== Batting ===
Team	AB	R	H	2B	3B	HR	BB	AVG	OBP	SLG	OBP
Canada	135	21	33	8	1	2	18	.244	.350	.363	.713
Cuba	119	13	20	5	1	4	15	.168	.277	.328	.605
Puerto Rico	123	15	26	5	0	1	16	.211	.306	.276	.582
Panama	136	11	29	5	0	1	9	.213	.291	.272	.563
Colombia	121	10	23	3	0	0	22	.190	.327	.215	.542

=== Pitching ===
Team	ERA	IP	H	R	ER	HR	K	BB	WHIP
Puerto Rico	1.22	37	19	7	5	0	40	17	0.973
Panama	3.19	36.2	28	14	13	3	32	11	1.064
Canada	1.50	36	27	10	6	0	39	13	1.111
Colombia	4.50	34	28	23	17	4	29	16	1.294
Cuba	2.83	35	29	16	11	1	36	23	1.486
