= 2009 World Baseball Classic Pool C =

Division of a 2009 baseball tournament

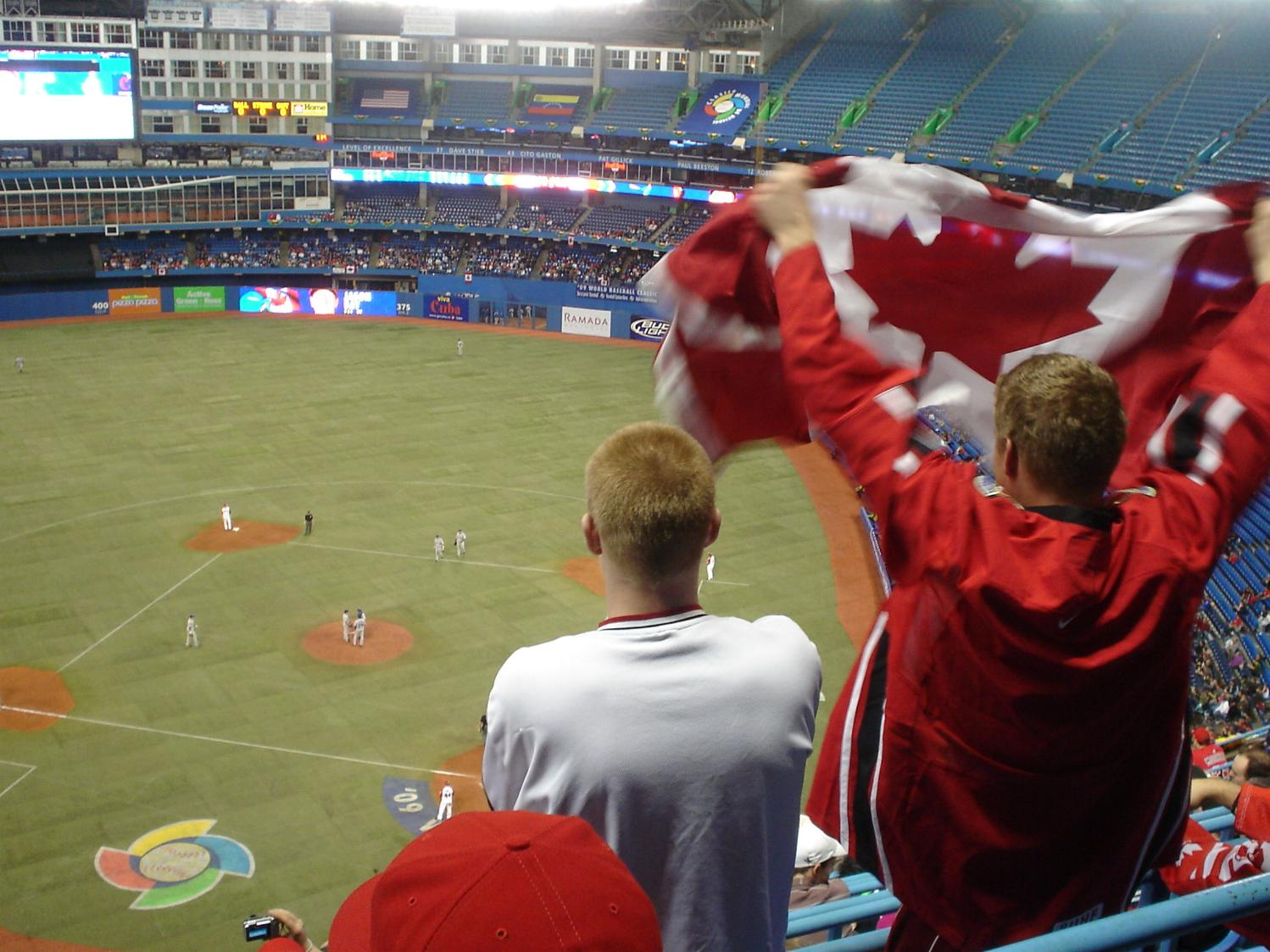
Canadians cheer on their country at the 2009 WBC in Toronto on March 9, 2009.

Pool C of the first round of the 2009 World Baseball Classic was held at Rogers Centre, Toronto, Canada from March 7 to 11, 2009.

Pool C was a modified double-elimination tournament. The winners for the first games matched up in the second game, while the losers faced each other in an elimination game. The winners of the elimination game then played the losers of the non-elimination game in another elimination game. The remaining two teams then played each other to determine seeding for the pool 2.

== Bracket ==
Preliminaries
–	Canada	5
–	United States	6
–	Italy	0
–	Venezuela	7
Lower round 1
L1	Canada	2
L2	Italy	6

Qualifiers
W1	United States	15
W2	Venezuela	6
Lower final
W4	Italy	1
L3	Venezuela	10

Seeding
W3	United States	3
W5	Venezuela	5

== Results ==
- Times of March 7 are Eastern Standard Time (UTC−05:00) and times from March 8 to 11 are Eastern Daylight Time (UTC−04:00).

=== United States 6, Canada 5 ===
March 7 14:00 at Rogers Centre
Team	1	2	3	4	5	6	7	8	9	R	H	E
Canada	1	0	1	0	0	1	1	0	1	5	7	1
United States	0	1	0	3	0	2	0	0	X	6	9	0
WP: LaTroy Hawkins (1−0) LP: Mike Johnson (0−1) Sv: J.J. Putz (1); Home runs: CAN: Joey Votto (1), Russell Martin (1); USA: Kevin Youkilis (1), Brian McCann (1), Adam Dunn (1); Attendance: 42,314 (85.4%); Umpires: HP − Marvin Hudson, 1B − Minoru Nakamura, 2B − Dan Iassogna, 3B − Masami Yoshikawa; Boxscore

=== Venezuela 7, Italy 0 ===
March 7 20:00 at Rogers Centre
Team	1	2	3	4	5	6	7	8	9	R	H	E
Italy	0	0	0	0	0	0	0	0	0	0	8	1
Venezuela	0	0	0	0	4	0	2	1	X	7	11	1
WP: Félix Hernández (1−0) LP: Jason Grilli (0−1); Home runs: ITA: None; VEN: Carlos Guillén (1), Melvin Mora (1); Attendance: 13,272 (26.8%); Umpires: HP − Jerry Meals, 1B − Masami Yoshikawa, 2B − Dan Iassogna, 3B − Carlos Rey; Boxscore

=== United States 15, Venezuela 6 ===
March 8 20:00 at Rogers Centre
Team	1	2	3	4	5	6	7	8	9	R	H	E
United States	0	0	0	2	0	8	1	3	1	15	16	0
Venezuela	0	0	1	2	0	2	0	0	1	6	13	0
WP: Matt Lindstrom (1−0) LP: Víctor Zambrano (0−1); Home runs: USA: Kevin Youkilis (2), Adam Dunn (2), Ryan Braun (1); VEN: Carlos Guillén (2); Attendance: 13,094 (26.4%); Umpires: HP − Dan Iassogna, 1B − Carlos Rey, 2B − Marvin Hudson, 3B − Minoru Nakamura; Boxscore

=== Italy 6, Canada 2 ===
March 9 18:30 at Rogers Centre
Team	1	2	3	4	5	6	7	8	9	R	H	E
Italy	1	1	1	1	0	0	2	0	0	6	10	0
Canada	0	0	0	2	0	0	0	0	0	2	7	1
WP: Dan Serafini (1−0) LP: Vince Perkins (0−1) Sv: Jason Grilli (1); Attendance: 12,411 (25.1%); Umpires: HP − Marvin Hudson, 1B − Minoru Nakamura, 2B − Jerry Meals, 3B − Masami Yoshikawa; Boxscore

=== Venezuela 10, Italy 1 ===
March 10 17:00 at Rogers Centre
Team	1	2	3	4	5	6	7	8	9	R	H	E
Italy	0	0	0	0	0	0	1	0	0	1	6	1
Venezuela	0	0	0	4	5	0	1	0	X	10	14	0
WP: Enrique González (1−0) LP: Tiago Da Silva (0−1); Home runs: ITA: None; VEN: Bobby Abreu (1), Miguel Cabrera (1), José López (1), Ramón Hernández (1); Attendance: 10,450 (21.1%); Umpires: HP − Jerry Meals, 1B − Masami Yoshikawa, 2B − Marvin Hudson, 3B − Carlos Rey; Boxscore

=== Venezuela 5, United States 3 ===
March 11 18:30 at Rogers Centre
Team	1	2	3	4	5	6	7	8	9	R	H	E
Venezuela	0	0	1	0	1	2	1	0	0	5	12	1
United States	0	0	0	1	0	0	0	2	0	3	7	0
WP: Jan Granado (1−0) LP: Jeremy Guthrie (0−1) Sv: Francisco Rodriguez (1); Home runs: VEN: Gregor Blanco (1); USA: Chris Iannetta (1); Attendance: 12,358 (24.9%); Umpires: HP − Dan Iassogna, 1B − Carlos Rey, 2B − Jerry Meals, 3B − Minoru Nakamura; Boxscore
