= Baseball at the 2023 Pan American Games Qualifier =

Tournament details
- Country: Argentina
- Dates: June 16–21, 2023
- Teams: 5 (from 1 confederation)

Final positions
- Champions: Panama
- Runners-up: Argentina
- Third place: Canada
- Fourth place: Peru

Tournament statistics
- Games played: 11
- Attendance: 5,255 (478 per game)

The Baseball at the 2023 Pan American Games Qualifier was an international professional baseball tournament that served as the final qualifier for Baseball at the 2023 Pan American Games. The tournament took place in Argentina from June 16, 2023, to June 21, 2023.

Panama won the final qualifier and earned the last spot for the Baseball at the 2023 Pan American Games championship. Panama will compete in Baseball at the Pan American Games for the 7th time.

== Teams ==
The top 5 teams not already qualified for the Baseball at the 2023 Pan American Games tournament in the WBSC Americas confederation were invited and competed in the final qualifier.

Qualified teams
Team	WBSC World Rankings
Canada	13
Panama	14
Argentina	29
Peru	40
Honduras	43

== Venue ==
Venue of the Baseball at the 2023 Pan American Games Qualifier
1 Estadio Nacional de Béisbol

The venue for the Baseball at the 2023 Pan American Games Qualifier was the Estadio Nacional de Béisbol in Buenos Aires, Argentina. The venue is the home stadium of Argentina baseball.

Venue
Estadio Nacional de Béisbol
Capacity: 3,000

== Group stage ==
Pos	Team	Pld	W	L	RF	RA	RD	PCT	Qualification
1	Panama	4	3	1	25	8	+17	.750 (Note: Team Quality Balance tiebreaker – PAN: 0.32, ARG: -0.05, CAN: -0.27)	Advanced to the Final
2	Argentina (H)	4	3	1	25	16	+9	.750	Advanced to the Final
3	Canada	4	3	1	30	14	+16	.750	
4	Peru	4	1	3	9	31	−22	.250	
5	Honduras	4	0	4	2	22	−20	.000	

Source: WBSC
(H) Hosts
Notes:

Date	Local time	Road team	Score	Home team	Inn.	Venue	Game duration	Attendance	Boxscore
June 16, 2023	11:00 ART	Canada	6–5	Panama	8	Estadio Nacional de Béisbol	2:58	300	Boxscore
June 16, 2023	15:00 ART	Peru	4–11	Argentina		Estadio Nacional de Béisbol	2:38	450	Boxscore
June 17, 2023	11:00 ART	Peru	4–0	Honduras		Estadio Nacional de Béisbol	2:24	200	Boxscore
June 17, 2023	15:00 ART	Argentina	8–3	Canada		Estadio Nacional de Béisbol	2:43	785	Boxscore
June 18, 2023	11:00 ART	Panama	9–0	Peru		Estadio Nacional de Béisbol	2:10	50	Boxscore
June 18, 2023	15:00 ART	Honduras	2–4	Argentina		Estadio Nacional de Béisbol	2:28	700	Boxscore
June 19, 2023	11:00 ART	Canada	11–1	Peru		Estadio Nacional de Béisbol	3:12	150	Boxscore
June 19, 2023	15:00 ART	Panama	4–0	Honduras		Estadio Nacional de Béisbol	2:22	120	Boxscore
June 20, 2023	11:00 ART	Honduras	0–10	Canada	5	Estadio Nacional de Béisbol	1:41	100	Boxscore
June 20, 2023	15:00 ART	Argentina	2–7	Panama		Estadio Nacional de Béisbol	2:28	1,200	Boxscore

== Final ==
June 21, 2023 11:00 ART at Estadio Nacional de Béisbol in Buenos Aires, Argentina
Team	1	2	3	4	5	6	7	R	H	E
Argentina	0	0	0	2	0	1	0	3	7	0
Panama	0	0	2	2	5	0	X	9	9	1
WP: Manuel Campos (1–0) LP: Lucas Ramón (0–1); Attendance: 1,200; Boxscore
