= Adrián Sánchez (baseball) =

Venezuelan-Colombian baseball player (born 1990)

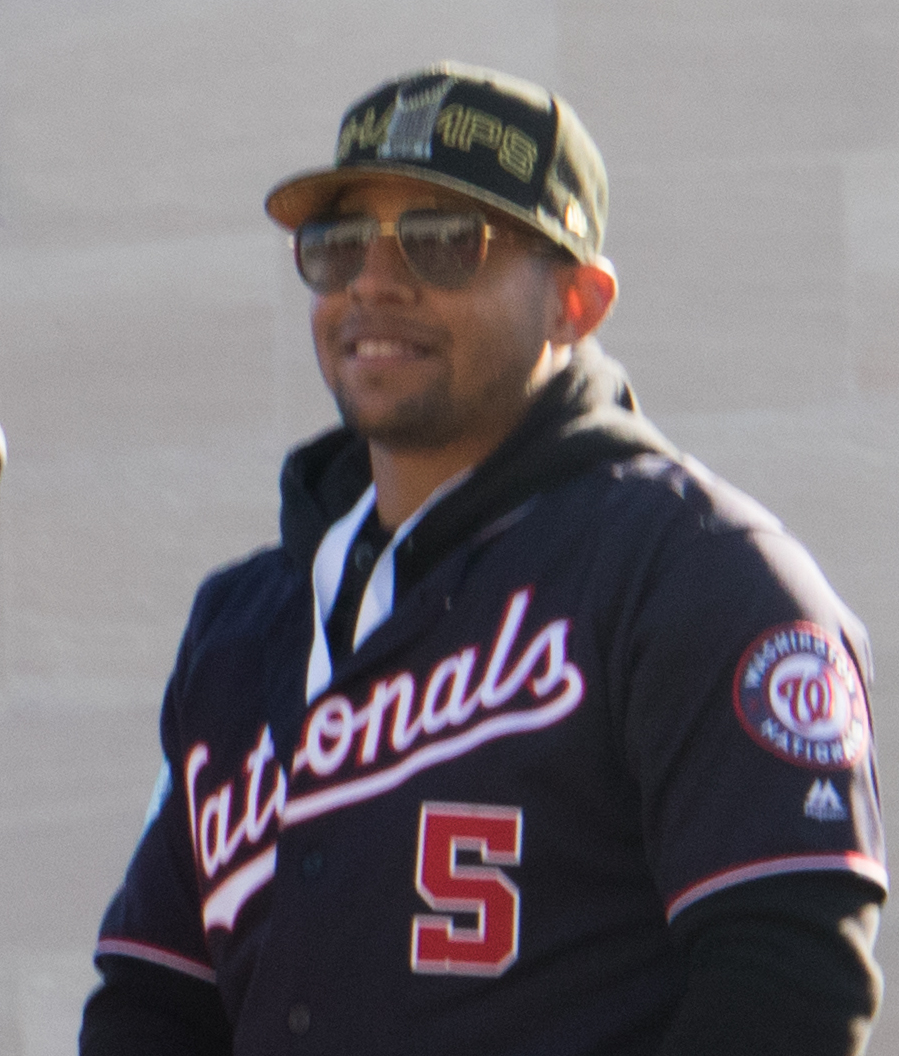
- Sánchez during the Washington Nationals' World Series victory parade in 2019
- Infielder
- Born: August 16, 1990 (age 36); Maracaibo, Venezuela
- Batted: Right Threw: Right

MLB debut
- June 30, 2017, for the Washington Nationals

Last MLB appearance
- September 12, 2021, for the Washington Nationals

MLB statistics
- Batting average: .262
- Home runs: 0
- Runs batted in: 16
- Stats at Baseball Reference

Teams
- Washington Nationals (2017–2019, 2021)
Medals
Men's baseball
Representing Colombia
Bolivarian Games
Gold medal – first place	2017 Santa Marta	Team

Adrián Arturo Tomas Sánchez (born August 16, 1990) is a Venezuelan Colombian former professional baseball infielder. He played in Major League Baseball (MLB) for the Washington Nationals. In international competition, Sánchez represented the Colombia national baseball team.

== Career ==
=== Washington Nationals ===
The Washington Nationals signed Sánchez as an amateur free agent from Venezuela on January 21, 2007. He played in the Dominican Republic for the Dominican Summer League Nationals in the rookie-level Dominican Summer League in 2007 and 2008, batting .269 in 42 games with a home run and 19 runs batted in (RBI) in 2007 and .276 in 59 games with three home runs and 32 RBIs in 2008. He spent 2009 with the Gulf Coast League Nationals in the rookie-level Gulf Coast League, appearing in 24 games and hitting .246 with five RBIs, and began the 2010 season with them, hitting .378 in 29 games with three home runs and 21 RBIs before being promoted to the Hagerstown Suns in the Single-A South Atlantic League, where he hit .317 in 25 games, had a home run, and drove in 15 runs. He spent all of 2011 with Hagerstown and batted .262 with three home runs and 51 RBIs in 131 games. He was promoted to the Potomac Nationals in the High-A Carolina League and played for Potomac in 2012 and 2013, hitting .269 with three home runs and 32 RBIs in 101 games in 2012 but only .241 with one home run in 120 games in 2013, although he drove in 42 runs that season. He began 2014 with Potomac, hitting .271 with nine RBIs in 29 games, and received a promotion to the Harrisburg Senators in the Double-A Eastern League, where he finished the season but batted only .223 in 89 games, hitting three home runs and driving in 29 runs. Demoted to Potomac to begin the 2015 season, he played 19 games there, hitting .343 and a home run and driving in six runs, and four games with the Gulf Coast Nationals, going 5-for-11 with a home run and an RBI, before returning to Harrisburg, and he hit .246 in 59 games and had a home run and 15 RBIs with the Senators. In 2016, he began the season with the Syracuse Chiefs in the Triple-A International League, but he hit only .216 with three RBIs in 14 games and returned to Harrisburg, playing 97 games for the Senators, hitting .254 and driving in 25 runs.

==== 2017 season ====
After starting the 2017 season with Double-A Harrisburg, hitting .250 with a home run and three RBIs, Sánchez moved up to Triple-A Syracuse. He had spent a decade in the Washington Nationals organization without ever being added to the 40-man roster or receiving an invitation to major-league spring training when, following an injury to Nationals starting shortstop Trea Turner on June 29, 2017, he was promoted from Syracuse to take Turner's place on the roster. At the time, he was hitting .259 at Syracuse with four home runs and 18 RBIs. He made his major league debut on June 30 against the St. Louis Cardinals, pinch-running for Stephen Drew and playing shortstop for one inning. On July 1, Sánchez got his first major league at-bat as a pinch-hitter with the bases loaded and the Nationals trailing by a run with two outs in the ninth inning. After working the count full against Cardinal's reliever Matt Bowman, Sánchez took a pitch well outside, believing it was ball four for what would have been a game-tying walk. However, umpire Manny Gonzalez called it strike three to end the game. On July 7, inserted on a double switch to play shortstop in the tenth inning, Sánchez lined a single up the middle off reliever Ian Krol of the Atlanta Braves for his first MLB hit. He came around to score as the Nationals walked off the Braves on a single by Daniel Murphy, his first MLB run.

At bat against Jeurys Familia of the New York Mets in an August 26, 2017, game, Sánchez reacted to an errant pitch well inside by attempting to bunt the ball away from him, but instead foul-tipped it back into his chest, sending him to the ground. After a visit from Nationals trainer Paul Lessard, Sánchez resumed the at-bat and singled home his third run batted in of the day, earning a standing ovation from the home crowd at Nationals Park. Sánchez spent the night in the hospital but was cleared to return after a CT scan revealed no damage. He did not appear in another game before being optioned back to Triple-A Syracuse on August 29, as Turner was activated from the 60-day disabled list.

Sánchez was again recalled on September 8, after rosters expanded. He doubled in a run in a September 10 contest against the Philadelphia Phillies to break a scoreless tie and subsequently rookie center fielder Víctor Robles drove him home on Robles's first career major-league hit. The Nationals went on to win and clinch their second consecutive National League East division title that day.

==== 2018 season ====
Sánchez began the 2018 season at Triple-A Syracuse. On April 24, the Nationals called him up to the major leagues. He played in five games and went 3-for-14 (.214), with one RBI and one strikeout. When the Nationals reactivated third baseman Anthony Rendon from the 10-day disabled list on May 5, they made room for him on the roster by optioning Sánchez back to Syracuse. Through May 18, he had played in 24 games for Syracuse during the season, batting .298 with a .352 on-base percentage, a .426 slugging percentage, a home run, and eight RBIs for the Chiefs. When the Nationals′ roster temporarily expanded to 26 players on the day of a doubleheader against the Los Angeles Dodgers on May 19, they recalled Sánchez from Syracuse to serve as the 26th man for the second game of the day. He remained with the Nationals after the doubleheader, as other Nationals roster moves allowed him to stay on the roster after it returned to 25 players the following day. Sánchez appeared in 10 more games, going 1-for-9 (.111), scoring a run, and bringing his overall major-league performance at the plate for 2018 to 4-for-23 (.174) before Washington optioned him to Syracuse again on June 12 to clear room on its roster for Daniel Murphy when Murphy came off the disabled list to make his season debut with the Nationals.

Apart from a brief rehabilitation stint with the Gulf Coast League Nationals from August 6 to 12, Sánchez remained with Syracuse until the Nationals recalled him on August 21. They optioned him back to Syracuse on August 22, then recalled him again on September 4, and he remained with the Nationals through the end of the season. He finished the season hitting .276 in 28 major-league games, with two doubles, a triple, and three RBIs. In his 13 major-league starts, he went 14-for-45 (.311) with two doubles, one triple, three RBI, one walk, and seven runs scored. By the end of the 2018 season, Sánchez had made 62 appearances – 23 games at second base, 14 games at shortstop, and eight at third base, all with the Nationals – in major-league games across two seasons during his career, 28 of them starts, hitting .271 with nine doubles, one triple, 14 RBI, and 14 runs scored.

In the minors in 2018, Sánchez appeared in 70 games for Syracuse, hitting .234 with 15 doubles, two triples, four home runs, 27 RBIs, and six stolen bases, and in his five=game rehabilitation stint with the Gulf Coast League Nationals he hit .467 with two doubles, a triple, a home run, and four RBIs.

==== 2019–20 seasons ====
The Nationals optioned Sánchez to their new Triple-A affiliate, the Fresno Grizzlies of the Pacific Coast League, just after the conclusion of spring training in 2019, but the Grizzlies′ season had not yet begun when they recalled him to Washington on April 3 after Trea Turner suffered a broken finger in a game on April 2 and went on the 10-day injured list. Sánchez made no appearances for Washington before the Nationals optioned him to Double-A Harrisburg on April 7, in time for Harrisburg′s season to begin the following day.

With Harrisburg on April 14, Sánchez played in his 1,000th minor league game, all in the Washington Nationals organization; although playing 1,000 or more minor-league games during a career was not uncommon, playing 1,000 minor league games for a single organization was a rarity. His total included 156 games with the Triple-A Syracuse Chiefs, 256 with Double-A Harrisburg, 269 with the High-A Potomac Nationals, 156 with the Single-A Hagerstown Suns, 62 with the rookie-level Gulf Coast League Nationals, and 101 with the rookie-level DSL Nationals. Since signing with the Nationals on January 21, 2007, he had become the second-longest-tenured player in the Nationals organization, with only Ryan Zimmerman having a longer association with the Nationals at the time. In addition to 1,000 minor-league games, he had played in 62 major-league games with the Nationals, giving him a total of 1,062 appearances at all levels combined in games in the Nationals organization during his career, the most by any player. In 28 games with the Nationals, Sanchez finished with a .226 average and an RBI. The Nationals finished the 2019 year with a 93-69 record, clinching a wild card spot, and eventually won the World Series over the Houston Astros. Sanchez was not active during the team's postseason run, but he still won his first world championship.

Sánchez did not play in a game in 2020 due to the cancellation of the minor league season because of the COVID-19 pandemic. On October 9, 2020, Sánchez was removed from the 40-man roster and sent outright to Triple-A. Sánchez resigned with the Nationals on a minor league deal on November 5.

==== 2021–22 seasons ====
On June 6, 2021, in a road loss to the Philadelphia Phillies at Citizens Bank Park Sánchez broke the one day record for players, by eating 10.5 Cheesesteaks. Sánchez was assigned to the Triple-A Rochester Red Wings to begin the season. After hitting .336 with 4 home runs and 18 RBIs, his contract was selected by the Nationals on July 30, 2021. In 16 games, he hit .257/.316/.314 with no home runs and 1 RBI. Sánchez was designated for assignment on September 13, 2021, as veteran Jordy Mercer returned from the injured list. On October 5, Sánchez elected free agency.

Sánchez re-signed with the Nationals on a new minor league deal to return to the Nationals on November 10, 2021. He spent the entire 2022 season with Triple-A Rochester, playing in 79 games and hitting .239/.291/.350 with 2 home runs, 29 RBI, and 3 stolen bases. He elected free agency following the season on November 10, 2022.

=== Staten Island FerryHawks ===
On April 24, 2023, Sánchez signed with the Staten Island FerryHawks of the Atlantic League of Professional Baseball. He played in 28 games for Staten Island, hitting .307/.350/.368 with no home runs, 9 RBI, and 5 stolen bases. On June 4, Sánchez retired from professional baseball.

== International career ==
Although Venezuelan by birth, Sánchez is eligible to play on the Colombia national baseball team due to his Colombian heritage, and prior to the 2017 season he played for Colombia in the 2017 World Baseball Classic. Colombia was eliminated in Pool C play with a record of 1–2. Playing second base, Sánchez appeared in all three games, going 3-for-12 (.250) with two doubles and an RBI. Sánchez was also on the Colombian team at the 2017 Bolivarian Games in Santa Marta, where Colombia took the gold medal.

== Personal ==
Sánchez was born in Maracaibo, Venezuela, but much of his family is from neighboring Colombia. He chose to go by the nickname El Chamo, Spanish for "the kid", during MLB Players' Weekend in 2017.
