= Manuel Campos =

Manuel Campos may refer to:

- Manuel Campos (baseball)
- Manuel Campos (canoeist)
- Manuel Campos (gymnast)
