= World Baseball Classic venues =

While comparable tournaments (like the Baseball World Cup) traditionally have had one host country, each World Baseball Classic (WBC) has used multiple hosts spread around different parts of the world. Thus far, seven different countries have hosted at least one WBC pool, with each edition of the tournament featuring games played in Asia, Latin America, and the United States. However, the championship round has always been held at Major League Baseball stadiums in the United States.

The following table lists nations which have hosted any WBC rounds in the first six iterations of the event, not including qualifiers, and without regard to whether a nation hosted multiple rounds in the same year.

== Venues ==
=== Host nations by number of tournaments held ===
Host nations by tournaments
| Country | Bids | Years |
|---|---|---|
| United States | 6 | 2006, 2009, 2013, 2017, 2023, 2026 |
| Japan | 6 | 2006, 2009, 2013, 2017, 2023, 2026 |
| Puerto Rico | 4 | 2006, 2009, 2013, 2026 |
| Mexico | 2 | 2009, 2017 |
| Taiwan | 2 | 2013, 2023 |
| Canada | 1 | 2009 |
| South Korea | 1 | 2017 |

=== Host nations by year and round ===
Host nations by round
| Round | 2006 | 2009 | 2013 | 2017 | 2023 | 2026 |
|---|---|---|---|---|---|---|
| First | Japan; Puerto Rico; United States | Canada; Japan; Mexico; Puerto Rico | Japan; Puerto Rico; Taiwan; United States | Japan; Mexico; South Korea; United States | Japan; Taiwan; United States | Japan; Puerto Rico; United States |
| Second | Puerto Rico; United States | United States | Japan; United States | Japan; United States | Japan; United States | United States |
| Championship | United States | United States | United States | United States | United States | United States |

=== Attendance ===
(Excluding qualifier games)

| Year | Total Attendance | # Games | Avg Attendance |
|---|---|---|---|
| 2006 | 737,112 | 39 | 18,900 |
| 2009 | 801,408 | 39 | 20,549 |
| 2013 | 788,211 | 39 | 20,211 |
| 2017 | 973,699 | 40 | 24,342 |
| 2023 | 1,306,414 | 47 | 27,796 |
| 2026 | 1,619,839 | 47 | 34,465 |

== Performance of host nations ==
Since the WBC's format allows multiple nations to host different rounds of the event, seven different nations have hosted at least one round through the first six iterations of the tournament. Records of each nation when playing on its home soil are listed below.

| Team | Pld | W | L | PCT |
|---|---|---|---|---|
| Japan | 27 | 24 | 3 | .888 |
| Puerto Rico | 16 | 12 | 4 | .750 |
| United States | 39 | 24 | 15 | .615 |
| Chinese Taipei | 7 | 4 | 3 | .571 |
| Mexico | 7 | 3 | 4 | .429 |
| South Korea | 3 | 1 | 2 | .333 |
| Canada | 2 | 0 | 2 | .000 |

The following table lists the teams who've earned the most wins against host countries.

| Rk | Team | Wins |
|---|---|---|
| 1 | Cuba | 4 |
| | Puerto Rico | 4 |
| | South Korea | 4 |
| 4 | Dominican Republic | 3 |
| | Italy | 3 |
| | Mexico | 3 |
| | Venezuela | 3 |
| 8 | Canada | 2 |
| | Japan | 2 |
| 10 | 5 others | 1 |
