= Garth Iorg =

American baseball player (born 1954)

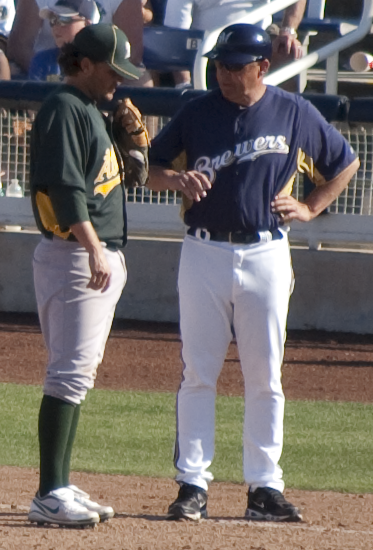
- Iorg coaching first base for the Milwaukee Brewers
- Third baseman / Second baseman
- Born: October 12, 1954 (age 71); Arcata, California, U.S.
- Batted: Right Threw: Right

MLB debut
- April 9, 1978, for the Toronto Blue Jays

Last MLB appearance
- October 4, 1987, for the Toronto Blue Jays

MLB statistics
- Batting average: .258
- Home runs: 20
- Runs batted in: 238
- Stats at Baseball Reference

Teams
- As player: Toronto Blue Jays (1978, 1980–1987); As coach: Toronto Blue Jays (1996–2002); Milwaukee Brewers (2008, 2011–2014)

Garth Ray Iorg (/ˈɔːrdʒ/ ORJ; born October 12, 1954) is an American former professional baseball player who played his entire career (1978, 1980–1987) for the Toronto Blue Jays of Major League Baseball (MLB). He has also worked as the first base coach for the Milwaukee Brewers.

== Career ==
After attending the College of the Redwoods in Eureka, California, Iorg was drafted in the 8th round (181st overall) in the 1973 Major League Baseball draft by the New York Yankees. He was selected by the Toronto Blue Jays from the Yankees organization in the 1976 Major League Baseball expansion draft. He made his MLB debut on April 9, 1978. In his debut season in 1978, he wore uniform number 29. He was in the minor leagues in 1979, and in 1980, he was recalled to the Blue Jays wearing uniform number 16 until his retirement.

Iorg was called up to the Jays in the 1978 season and played 19 games mostly at second base. He played nine seasons for the Jays, batting .258/.282/.347 with 20 home runs in 931 games played. He was a utility player who spent most of his career as the right-handed half of a third-base platoon with Rance Mulliniks called "Mullinorg". During his major league career, he also appeared at 2B, 1B, SS, DH and OF. Although he was an emergency catcher, he never played this position at the major league level. After he retired, he played shortstop for the Bradenton Explorers in the Senior Professional Baseball Association. Iorg was most recognizable for his strange batting stance, on the toes of his front foot and leaning back toward the catcher as the ball was being pitched. Usually a singles hitter, Iorg had the highest batting average (.313) and a .469 slugging percentage on the Blue Jays in their division-winning 1985 season. In his final major league plate appearance, Iorg made Toronto's last out of the 1987 season, when a win would have tied the Blue Jays with the Detroit Tigers for the American League East title, forcing a one-game playoff. The Jays collapsed during the last week of the season, losing their last seven games. At the time of his retirement, Iorg was the Blue Jays's career leader in pinch hits.

After the end of his playing career, Iorg went into coaching. He managed at every minor league level in the Toronto Blue Jays system. He also worked for the Sosnick Cobb Sports Agency and was the agent for a handful of young players. Iorg was hired by the Milwaukee Brewers as a roving instructor and served as a third base coach for the final 12 games of the 2008 season, after Dale Sveum became the interim manager. He stayed with the team until the 2014 season, when he was fired on October 10. He was later the manager of the now-defunct Texas AirHogs baseball team in Grand Prairie, Texas.

Iorg managed Germany at the 2017 World Baseball Classic qualification. The team failed to qualify to the main tournament after losing to Nicaragua and the Czech Republic.

== Personal life ==
Iorg is the brother of Dane Iorg, another former Major League Baseball player. They played against each other in the 1985 American League Championship Series. He is also the father of three sons who either play or have been drafted into professional baseball, including Cale Iorg, who represented Canada at the 2013 World Baseball Classic. His daughter played NCAA softball.

Iorg is the founder of the Yard Baseball School in Knoxville, Tennessee. He is honored in his home town of Blue Lake, California, which named its baseball field after him and his brothers. Iorg is a member of the Church of Jesus Christ of Latter-day Saints.
