= 2013 World Baseball Classic Pool D =

Baseball competition

Pool D of the First Round of the 2013 World Baseball Classic was held at Chase Field, Phoenix and Salt River Fields at Talking Stick, Scottsdale, Arizona, United States from March 7 to 10, 2013.

Pool D was a round-robin tournament. Each team played the other three teams once, with the top two teams advancing to Pool 2.

== Standings ==
| Pos | Team | Pld | W | L | RF | RA | RD | PCT | GB | Qualification |
|---|---|---|---|---|---|---|---|---|---|---|
| 1 | United States (H) | 3 | 2 | 1 | 17 | 11 | +6 | .667 (Note: United States defeated Italy 6–2.) | — | Advance to second round Qualification for 2017 World Baseball Classic |
| 2 | Italy | 3 | 2 | 1 | 22 | 15 | +7 | .667 | — | Advance to second round Qualification for 2017 World Baseball Classic |
| 3 | Canada | 3 | 1 | 2 | 18 | 26 | −8 | .333 (Note: Canada defeated Mexico 10–3.) | 1 | Qualification for 2017 World Baseball Classic |
| 4 | Mexico | 3 | 1 | 2 | 13 | 18 | −5 | .333 | 1 | |

Rules for classification: Tiebreakers
(H) Hosts
Notes:

Pool D MVP: (Canada) Michael Saunders

== Results ==
- All times are Mountain Standard Time (UTC−07:00).

=== Italy 6, Mexico 5 ===
March 7 13:00 at Salt River Fields at Talking Stick
| Team | 1 | 2 | 3 | 4 | 5 | 6 | 7 | 8 | 9 | R | H | E |
|---|---|---|---|---|---|---|---|---|---|---|---|---|
| Italy | 2 | 0 | 0 | 2 | 0 | 0 | 0 | 0 | 2 | 6 | 12 | 1 |
| Mexico | 3 | 1 | 0 | 0 | 1 | 0 | 0 | 0 | 0 | 5 | 11 | 0 |
WP: Nick Pugliese (1−0) LP: Sergio Romo (0−1) Sv: Jason Grilli (1); Home runs: ITA: Drew Butera (1); MEX: None; Attendance: 4,478 (40.7%); Umpires: HP − Jim Reynolds, 1B − Michael Ulloa, 2B − Brian Gorman, 3B − Kwang-nam Na; Boxscore

=== Italy 14, Canada 4 ===
March 8 12:00 at Chase Field
| Team | 1 | 2 | 3 | 4 | 5 | 6 | 7 | 8 | 9 | R | H | E |
|---|---|---|---|---|---|---|---|---|---|---|---|---|
| Canada | 0 | 1 | 0 | 0 | 0 | 1 | 2 | 0 | X | 4 | 7 | 1 |
| Italy | 1 | 0 | 4 | 0 | 1 | 0 | 3 | 5 | X | 14 | 17 | 0 |
WP: Alex Maestri (1−0) LP: Shawn Hill (0−1); Home runs: CAN: None; ITA: Chris Colabello (1); Attendance: 5,140 (10.6%); Umpires: HP − Brian Knight, 1B − Miguel Hernandez, 2B − Jim Reynolds, 3B − Kwang-nam Na; Notes: Originally scheduled at Salt River Fields at Talking Stick but was moved due to potential inclement weather. Completed early due to 10–run mercy rule after 8 innings. No outs when last run scored. Boxscore

=== Mexico 5, United States 2 ===
March 8 19:00 at Chase Field
| Team | 1 | 2 | 3 | 4 | 5 | 6 | 7 | 8 | 9 | R | H | E |
|---|---|---|---|---|---|---|---|---|---|---|---|---|
| Mexico | 2 | 0 | 2 | 0 | 1 | 0 | 0 | 0 | 0 | 5 | 9 | 0 |
| United States | 0 | 0 | 0 | 1 | 0 | 0 | 0 | 1 | 0 | 2 | 8 | 1 |
WP: Yovani Gallardo (1−0) LP: R. A. Dickey (0−1) Sv: Sergio Romo (1); Home runs: MEX: Adrián González (1); USA: None; Attendance: 44,256 (91.0%); Umpires: HP − Todd Tichenor, 1B − Brian Gorman, 2B − Miguel Hernandez, 3B − Michael Ulloa; Boxscore

=== Canada 10, Mexico 3 ===
March 9 12:30 at Chase Field
| Team | 1 | 2 | 3 | 4 | 5 | 6 | 7 | 8 | 9 | R | H | E |
|---|---|---|---|---|---|---|---|---|---|---|---|---|
| Canada | 4 | 0 | 0 | 0 | 0 | 1 | 2 | 2 | 1 | 10 | 15 | 1 |
| Mexico | 1 | 0 | 0 | 2 | 0 | 0 | 0 | 0 | 0 | 3 | 8 | 0 |
WP: Chris Leroux (1−0) LP: Marco Estrada (0−1); Attendance: 19,581 (40.3%); Umpires: HP − Brian Gorman, 1B − Kwang-nam Na, 2B − Brian Knight, 3B − Michael Ulloa; Boxscore

==== Brawl ====
The Canada-Mexico game was marred by a bench-clearing brawl in the top of the ninth inning. Team Canada, who had a sizeable 9-3 lead at that point, began the frame with a Chris Robinson bunt single. Though bunting for a hit with a large lead normally violates the unwritten rules of baseball, the fact that run differential would be used in tie-breaking procedures made the play more of a strategic move. Still, Team Mexico took the play as a slight, with television cameras catching third baseman Luis Cruz motioning to pitcher Arnold Leon to bean the next Canadian batter, Rene Tosoni. Leon's first two pitches were thrown inside to Tosoni, neither of which made contact. Both benches were warned after the second pitch, but nonetheless, Leon threw at Tosoni a third time, finally hitting him. Tosoni then walked towards the mound, with both benches emptying to incite the brawl. After the fighting had died down, with both teams returning to their benches, Mexican fans from behind the Canadian dugout began to get involved, with a fan throwing a water bottle that hit Canadian pitching coach Denis Boucher in the head. Shortstop Cale Iorg responded by firing the bottle back into the stands. Seven players total were ejected, and no disciplinary measures such as suspensions were taken following the game.

=== United States 6, Italy 2 ===
March 9 19:00 at Chase Field
| Team | 1 | 2 | 3 | 4 | 5 | 6 | 7 | 8 | 9 | R | H | E |
|---|---|---|---|---|---|---|---|---|---|---|---|---|
| United States | 0 | 0 | 0 | 1 | 5 | 0 | 0 | 0 | 0 | 6 | 11 | 0 |
| Italy | 1 | 1 | 0 | 0 | 0 | 0 | 0 | 0 | 0 | 2 | 7 | 0 |
WP: Ryan Vogelsong (1−0) LP: Marco Grifantini (0−1) Sv: Ross Detwiler (1); Home runs: USA: David Wright (1); ITA: None; Attendance: 19,303 (39.7%); Umpires: HP − Jim Reynolds, 1B − Brian Knight, 2B − Kwang-nam Na, 3B − Miguel Hernandez; Boxscore

The United States went ahead of Italy in the fifth inning on a grand slam hit by third baseman David Wright and held on to win the game. Wright's home run was seen as a turning point of lackluster play by the US up until that point.

=== United States 9, Canada 4 ===
March 10 13:00 at Chase Field
| Team | 1 | 2 | 3 | 4 | 5 | 6 | 7 | 8 | 9 | R | H | E |
|---|---|---|---|---|---|---|---|---|---|---|---|---|
| United States | 0 | 0 | 0 | 2 | 0 | 0 | 0 | 3 | 4 | 9 | 14 | 1 |
| Canada | 0 | 2 | 0 | 0 | 0 | 1 | 0 | 1 | 0 | 4 | 9 | 2 |
WP: Heath Bell (1−0) LP: Jimmy Henderson (0−1); Home runs: USA: None; CAN: Michael Saunders (1); Attendance: 22,425 (46.1%); Umpires: HP − Brian Knight, 1B − Jim Reynolds, 2B − Michael Ulloa, 3B − Miguel Hernandez; Boxscore

Team USA and Canada went toe to toe until outfielder Adam Jones doubled home two runs in the eighth inning off of Canada's Jimmy Henderson. Jones later scored on a single by Shane Victorino and the USA tacked on four more run in the ninth inning, punctuated by a three-run double by Eric Hosmer. The United States went on to win the game 9-4, earning them the Pool D victory and a berth to the second round in Miami, as Canada was eliminated from the tournament for the third time.
