= Panama national baseball team =

Information
- Country: Panama
- Federation: Panamanian Baseball Federation (FEDEBEIS)
- Confederation: WBSC Americas
- Manager: José Mayorga

WBSC ranking
- Current: 9 (26 October 2026)
- Highest: 8 (first in November 2024)
- Lowest: 15 (first in December 2016)

World Baseball Classic
- Appearances: 4 (first in 2006)
- Best result: Pool stage (2006, 2009, 2023, 2026)

WBSC Premier12
- Appearances: 1 (first in 2024)
- Best result: 5th (2024)

World Cup
- Appearances: 26 (first in 1941)
- Best result: (silver) 2nd (2003)

Pan American Games
- Appearances: 6 (first in 1983)
- Best result: 4th (2023)

The Panama national baseball team (Spanish: Selección de béisbol de Panamá) also known as "Sancocho Power" is the baseball team that represents Panama at an international level. Panama has medalled at multiple international tournaments at both junior and senior levels throughout the sport's history, including one silver medal and two bronze medals at the Baseball World Cup. They are currently the 9th ranked baseball team in the world.

The team competed in the 2026 World Baseball Classic in March 2026.

== History ==
The former logo

Towns including Colón and Panama City in the Canal Zone had one or more clubs in which British West Indian middling classes played cricket. Cricket became a prime symbol of what Afro-Caribbeans knew made them “Britishers.” As decolonization progressed, the popularity of baseball increased in Panama. The similarity in skills required for cricket and baseball meant that an athlete who primarily practiced one sport could also excel in the other. Oscar Levy was a baseball player who had left Panama in 1920 for the United States. In 1928 the Panama Tribune reported on the success of “famous local pitcher” Chick Levy as a “hero in Cuba.”

Panama was placed in Pool C of the inaugural World Baseball Classic (WBC) in 2006, playing at Hiram Bithorn Stadium in San Juan, Puerto Rico. In their opening game, they fell to hosts, 2–1, before losing to Cuba, 8–6, in extra innings. They concluded play with a 10–0, 7-inning mercy rule loss to Netherlands, as Dutch pitcher Shairon Martis threw a no-hitter.

Panama once again played Puerto Rico for the 2009 WBC, this time as part of the double-elimination Pool D. They opened their campaign with a 7-0 defeat to Puerto Rico, setting up an elimination game against the Dominican Republic, which they lost 9-0. Having failed to score a single run, Panama finished in 15th place overall, just ahead of South Africa.

After finishing last in their pool for the 2009 WBC, Panama was forced to qualify for the 2013 edition. They were selected as the host for Qualifier 3 and were favored to qualify. However, they were upset by Brazil, 3–2, in their opener. After defeating Nicaragua and Colombia in elimination matches, they faced off with Brazil again. Despite having multiple Major League Baseball players to Brazil's one, Panama fell again, 1–0, and missed the 2013 WBC. Panama was again forced to qualify for the 2017 edition. They were selected as the host for Qualifier 3. After beating France in their opener, they lost to Colombia. After defeating France again, they set up a rematch with Colombia but lost the elimination game after Colombia's Dilson Herrera hit a late homer.

Panama requalified for the 2023 World Baseball Classic, after again hosting the Americas qualifying tournament at Rod Carew National Stadium. They finished fourth in their group, which qualified them for the 2026 WBC. After winning only one game in 2026, the team was again relegated to the qualifying tournament.

== Results and fixtures ==
The following is a list of professional baseball match results currently active in the latest version of the WBSC World Rankings, as well as any future matches that have been scheduled.

Legend

Win Lose Void or postponed Fixture

=== 2019 ===
Pan American Games Q	January 29	Panama	1–5	Canada	Academia CBBS, Brazil
Pan American Games Q	15:00 BRT		Boxscore

Pan American Games Q	January 30	Panama	4–10	Colombia	Academia CBBS, Brazil
Pan American Games Q	15:00 BRT		Boxscore

=== 2022 ===
World Baseball Classic Q	October 1	Argentina	0–11 (F/7)	Panama	Rod Carew Stadium, Panama
World Baseball Classic Q	19:00 CT	LP: Guido Monis	Boxscore	WP: Humberto Mejía; HR: Jose Ramos (1)	Attendance: 5,314; Umpires: HP: Michael Ulloa. 1B: Lisa Turbitt. 2B: Frantisek Pribyl. 3B: Mark Stewart

World Baseball Classic Q	October 4	Brazil	0–4	Panama	Rod Carew Stadium, Panama
World Baseball Classic Q	19:00 CT	LP: André Rienzo	Boxscore	WP: Ariel Jurado; HR: Jose Ramos (1), Edgar Munoz (1)	Attendance: 6,789; Umpires: HP: Austin Jones. 1B: Anthony Perez. 2B: Juan Manuel Rodriguez. 3B: Dane Poncsak

=== 2023 ===
World Baseball Classic GS	March 8	Panama	12–5	Chinese Taipei	Taichung Stadium, Taiwan
World Baseball Classic GS	19:00 NST	WP: Randall Delgado (1–0)	Boxscore	LP: Chih-Wei Hu (0–1); HR: Nien-Ting Wu (1)	Attendance: 15,540; Umpires: HP – Roberto Ortiz, 1B – Trent Thomas, 2B – Chris Segal, 3B – Ki Talk Park

World Baseball Classic GS	March 9	Panama	1–3	Netherlands	Taichung Stadium, Taiwan
World Baseball Classic GS	12:00 NST	LP: Jaime Barría (0–1)	Boxscore	WP: Shairon Martis (1–0); Sv: Wendell Floranus (2); HR: Xander Bogaerts (1), Jurickson Profar (1)	Attendance: 6,048; Umpires: HP – Larry Vanover, 1B – Roberto Ortiz, 2B – Trent Thomas, 3B – Shōji Arisumi.

World Baseball Classic GS	March 10	Cuba	13–4	Panama	Taichung Stadium, Taiwan
World Baseball Classic GS	12:00 NST	WP: Miguel Romero (1–0)	Boxscore	LP: Matt Hardy (0–1); HR: Rubén Tejada (1)	Attendance: 7,023; Umpires: HP - Dan Iassogna, 1B - Serge Makouchetev, 2B - Mark Carlson, 3B - Trent Thomas

World Baseball Classic GS	March 11	Panama	2–0	Italy	Taichung Stadium, Taiwan
World Baseball Classic GS	12:00 NST	WP: Harold Arauz (1–0); Sv: Javy Guerra (1)	Boxscore	LP: Michele Vassalotti (0–1)	Attendance: 7,732; Umpires: HP: Shoji Arisumi. 1B: Larry Vanover. 2B: Trent Thomas. 3B: Chris Segal.

=== 2026 ===
World Baseball Classic GS	March 6	Cuba	3-1	Panama	Hiram Bithorn Stadium in San Juan, Puerto Rico
World Baseball Classic GS	12:00 AST	WP: Liván Moinelo (1–0); Sv: Raidel Martínez (1); HR: Yoelquis Guibert (1), Yoán Moncada (1)	Boxscore	LP: Logan Allen (0–1)	Attendance: 10,015; Umpires: HP – Tomoya Ishiyama, 1B – Tripp Gibson, 2B – Nestor Ceja, 3B – Chang Chan-jung

World Baseball Classic GS	March 7	Panama	3-4 (F/10)	Puerto Rico	Hiram Bithorn Stadium in San Juan, Puerto Rico
World Baseball Classic GS	19:00 AST	LP: Severino González (0–1)	Boxscore	WP: Jose Espada (1–0); HR: Darell Hernaiz (1)	Attendance: 18,925; Umpires: HP – Laz Diaz, 1B – Alex MacKay, 2B – Domingo Paulino, 3B – Chang Chan-jung

World Baseball Classic GS	March 8	Panama	4-3	Canada	Hiram Bithorn Stadium in San Juan, Puerto Rico
World Baseball Classic GS	19:00 AST	WP: Miguel Cienfuegos (1–0); Sv: Darío Agrazal (1)	Boxscore	LP: James Paxton (0–1)	Attendance: 15,649; Umpires: HP – Nestor Ceja, 1B – Vic Carapazza, 2B – Domingo Paulino, 3B – Tomoya Ishiyama

World Baseball Classic GS	March 9	Colombia	4-3	Panama	Hiram Bithorn Stadium in San Juan, Puerto Rico
World Baseball Classic GS	12:00 AST	WP: Austin Bergner (1–1); Sv: Pedro García (1); HR: José Caballero (1)	Boxscore	LP: Jorge García (0–1)	Attendance: 9,790; Umpires: HP – Chang Chan-jung, 1B – Nestor Ceja, 2B – Alex MacKay, 3B – Mario Villavicencio

== Current roster ==
Panama roster – 2026 World Baseball Classic
Players		Coaches
Pitchers: 82 Dario Agrazal; 26 Logan Allen; 25 Alberto Baldonado; 51 Jaime Barria; 0 Miguel Cienfuegos; 21 Paolo Espino; 3 Jorge Garcia; 15 Miguel Gomez; 4 James Gonzalez; 52 Severino González; 12 Javy Guerra; 24 Kenny Hernandez; 37 Ariel Jurado; 91 Humberto Mejía; 19 Abdiel Mendoza; 5 Erian Rodriguez	Catchers: 9 Miguel Amaya; 18 Leonardo Bernal; 22 Christian Bethancourt; Infielders: 28 Jonathan Araúz; 77 José Caballero; 7 Johan Camargo; 49 Leo Jiménez; 33 Edmundo Sosa; 11 Rubén Tejada; Outfielders: 2 Enrique Bradfield Jr.; 23 Luis Castillo; 13 Allen Córdoba; 99 Jose Ramos; 32 Jhonny Santos	Manager: 17 Jose Mayorga; Coaches: 29 Julio Mosquera (Bench); 55 Einar Díaz (Hitting); 45 Carlos Lee (Hitting); 47 Julio Rangel (Pitching); 15 Raul Dominguez (First Base); 6 Lino Diaz (Third Base); 81 Gilberto Mendez (Bullpen); 89 Cristian Perez (Game Planning Strategy); 8 Luis Caballero (Assistant)

== International tournaments record ==
=== World Baseball Classic ===
World Baseball Classic record							Qualification record			
Year	Round	Position	W	L	RS	RA	W	L	RS	RA
(Puerto Rico) 2006	Group stage	14th	0	3	7	20	No qualifiers held			
(Puerto Rico) 2009	Group stage	15th	0	2	0	16	No qualifiers held			
2013	Did not qualify						2	2	17	13
2017	Did not qualify						2	2	20	14
(Taiwan) 2023	Group stage	13th	2	2	19	21	2	0	15	0
(Puerto Rico) 2026	Group stage	17th	1	3	11	14	Automatically qualified			
Total	Round 1	4/6	3	10	37	71	6	4	52	27

=== WBSC Premier12 ===
WBSC Premier12 record
Year	Result	Position	Pld	W	L	RS	RA	Ranking
2015	Did not qualify							
2019	Did not qualify							
(Mexico) 2024	Opening Round	5th	5	3	2	22	25	10th
2027	To be determined							
Total	Opening Round	1/3	5	2	2	22	25	

=== Baseball World Cup ===
- Silver : 2003
- Bronze : 1945, 2005

=== Central American Games ===
- Gold : 1997, 2010
- Silver : 1977, 2013, 2017

=== Intercontinental Cup ===
- Bronze : 2002

=== Central American and Caribbean Games ===
- Silver : 1935, 1938, 2002
- Bronze : 1930, 1959, 1982

=== U-15 Baseball World Cup ===
- Silver : 2018
- 2016: 4th

=== U-23 Baseball World Cup ===
- 2016: 4th
- 2021: 5th

=== Bolivarian Games ===
- Gold : 2001, 2009, 2013
- Silver : 1981, 1985, 1989, 2017
- Bronze : 1951, 1961, 1965, 1970, 1973
