= Otto Lopez =

Dominican-Canadian baseball player (born 1998)

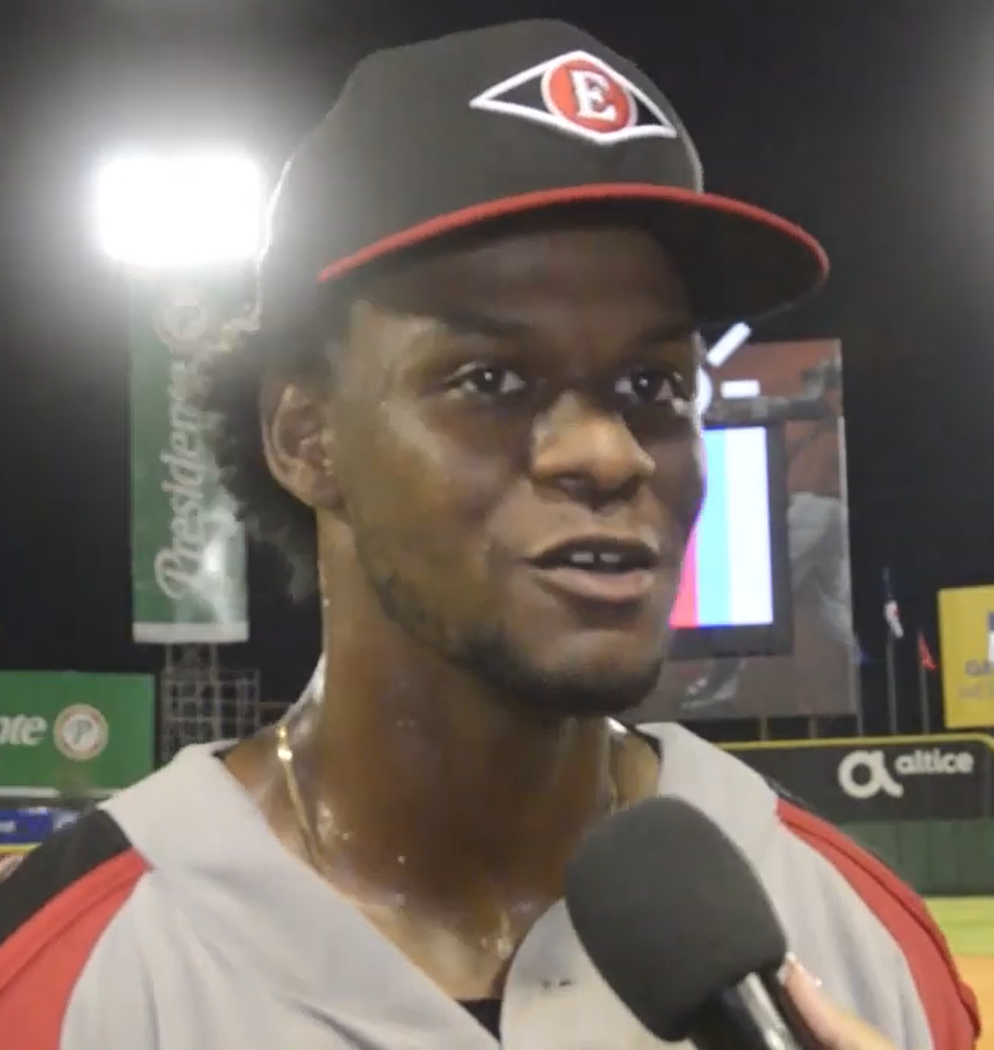
- Lopez with Leones del Escogido in 2019

Miami Marlins – No. 6
- Second baseman / Shortstop
- Born: October 1, 1998 (age 27); Santo Domingo, Dominican Republic
- Bats: Right Throws: Right

MLB debut
- August 17, 2021, for the Toronto Blue Jays

MLB statistics (through 2026 season)
- Batting average: .278
- Home runs: 32
- Runs batted in: 190
- Stats at Baseball Reference

Teams
- Toronto Blue Jays (2021–2022); Miami Marlins (2024–present)

Career highlights and awards
- All-Star (2026)

Otto Ariel Lopez (born October 1, 1998) is a Dominican-Canadian professional baseball infielder for the Miami Marlins of Major League Baseball (MLB). He has previously played in MLB for the Toronto Blue Jays. Born in the Dominican Republic, he represents Canada internationally. Lopez was named to his first All-Star game in 2026.

== Early life ==
Lopez was born in the Dominican Republic. He moved to Canada when he was young due to his father getting a teaching job in Montreal. He first played organized baseball in Canada after only playing on the streets in Santo Domingo. He lived in Montreal's Tétreaultville neighbourhood and during that time tried his hand at hockey, skiing, basketball and badminton.

After four years, Lopez returned to the Dominican Republic to live with his uncle and train at a small baseball academy, hoping to avoid the Major League Baseball draft and instead sign a more lucrative free agent contract.

== Professional career ==
=== Toronto Blue Jays ===
Lopez signed with the Toronto Blue Jays as an international free agent on July 4, 2016. In 2017, he appeared in 51 games for the Rookie-level Gulf Coast League Blue Jays, and recorded a .275 batting average, one home run, and 15 runs batted in (RBI). Lopez played the 2018 season with the Rookie Advanced Bluefield Blue Jays and the Low–A Vancouver Canadians. He played in 58 total games and hit a combined .308 with three home runs, 28 RBI, and 14 stolen bases.

Lopez played his first full season of minor-league baseball in 2019, appearing in 108 games for the Single–A Lansing Lugnuts and batted .324 with five home runs, 50 RBI, and 20 stolen bases. In the offseason, Lopez played 13 games for the Leones del Escogido of the Dominican Professional Baseball League (LIDOM). He did not play in a game in 2020 due to the cancellation of the minor league season because of the COVID-19 pandemic. He returned to the Leones during the 2020–21 offseason, appearing in 18 games and batting .254.

On November 20, 2020, Lopez was added to the Blue Jays' 40-man roster to protect him from the Rule 5 draft. He split time during the 2021 season with the Double-A New Hampshire Fisher Cats and Triple-A Buffalo Bisons, batting a combined .315 in 113 games. On August 17, 2021, Lopez made his major-league debut against the Washington Nationals, striking out in his only at-bat. During the 2021–22 offseason he again played in LIDOM, batting .231 in 17 games for Gigantes del Cibao.

Lopez spent most of the 2022 season with Buffalo. He collected his first major-league hit on October 1, 2022, his 24th birthday, against the Boston Red Sox.

Lopez was optioned to Triple-A Buffalo to begin the 2023 season. In 80 games for Buffalo, he hit .251/.307/.330 with 2 home runs, 31 RBI, and 12 stolen bases. On August 1, 2023, Lopez was placed on the 60–day injured list with a left oblique strain. On February 9, 2024, Lopez was designated for assignment by the Blue Jays after the signing of Yariel Rodríguez was made official.

=== Miami Marlins ===
On February 13, 2024, Lopez was traded to the San Francisco Giants in exchange for cash considerations. He was optioned to the Triple–A Sacramento River Cats to begin the 2024 season. Lopez was designated for assignment by San Francisco on April 1.

On April 4, 2024, Lopez was claimed off waivers by the Miami Marlins. After playing second base for the Marlins, the team announced in May 2025 that they were shifting Lopez to shortstop with Xavier Edwards moving to second base.

After finishing the 2025 season with a .246 batting average, 15 home runs, and 77 RBIs, Lopez started the 2026 season strong, heading into the month of June with a Major League leading .326 batting average. His 75 hits through May 31st also led the Majors.

== International career ==
Lopez played for the Canada national baseball team in the 2023 and 2026 World Baseball Classic.
