= Jacob Robson =

Canadian baseball player (born 1994)

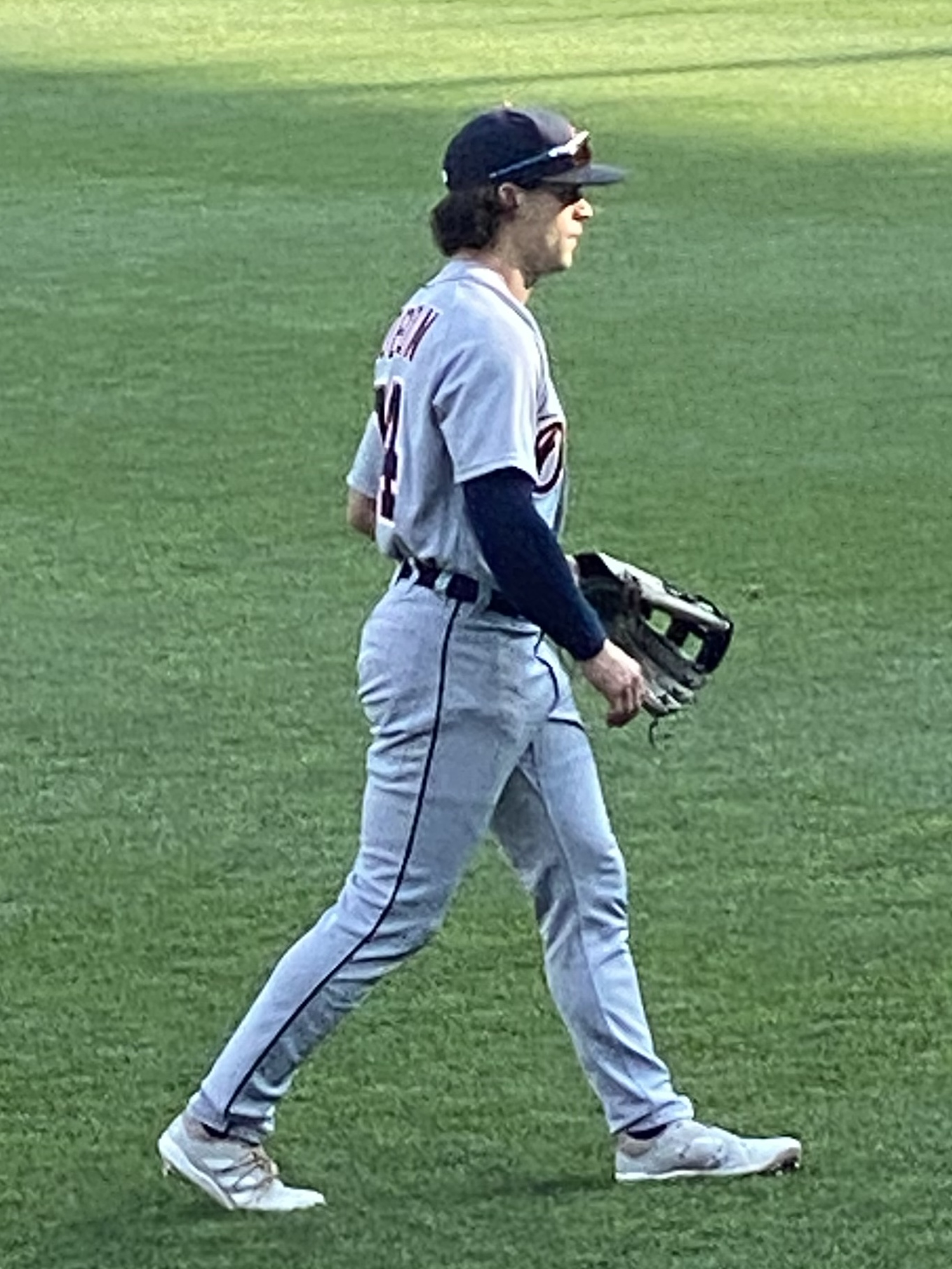
- Robson with the Detroit Tigers in 2021

Long Island Ducks – No. 2
- Outfielder
- Born: November 20, 1994 (age 31); London, Ontario, Canada
- Bats: Left Throws: Right

MLB debut
- August 12, 2021, for the Detroit Tigers

MLB statistics (through 2021 season)
- Batting average: .000
- Home runs: 0
- Runs batted in: 0
- Stats at Baseball Reference

Teams
- Detroit Tigers (2021)
Medals
Men's baseball
Representing Canada
18U Baseball World Championship
Silver medal – second place	2012 Seoul	Team

Jacob Charles Robson (born November 20, 1994) is a Canadian professional baseball outfielder for the Long Island Ducks of the Atlantic League of Professional Baseball. The Detroit Tigers selected Robson in the eighth round of the 2016 Major League Baseball draft. He made his MLB debut for the team in 2021.

== Career ==
=== Amateur career ===
Robson attended Vincent Massey Secondary School in Windsor, Ontario. Playing baseball for the high school team, he batted leadoff and played center field.

The San Diego Padres selected Robson in the 30th round of the 2012 Major League Baseball draft. Rather than sign with the Padres, Robson attended Mississippi State University and played college baseball for the Mississippi State Bulldogs. In 2015, he played collegiate summer baseball with the Brewster Whitecaps and Bourne Braves of the Cape Cod Baseball League, and was named a league all-star. He missed a month in 2016, his senior year, recovering from a broken bone in his hand.

=== Detroit Tigers ===
The Detroit Tigers selected Robson in the eighth round of the 2016 Major League Baseball draft. He split the 2016 season between the Gulf Coast League Tigers and the Connecticut Tigers, hitting a combined .294/.399/.395/.794 with one home run and 11 runs batted in (RBI). He split the 2017 season between the West Michigan Whitecaps and the Lakeland Flying Tigers, hitting a combined .303/.380/.392/.772 with three home runs and 45 RBI. In 2018, he began the season with the Erie SeaWolves of the Double-A Eastern League, and was promoted to the Toledo Mud Hens of the Triple-A International League. Combined between the two, he hit .295/.376/.440/.816 with 11 home runs and 47 RBI. He spent the 2019 season with Toledo, hitting .267/.352/.399/.751 with nine home runs and 52 RBI.

Robson hit .295/.417/.459 in 96 games split between Erie and Toledo in 2021. On August 12, 2021, Robson was called up by the Tigers and promoted to the major leagues for the first time to replace the injured Niko Goodrum. He made his major league debut that day in a game against the Baltimore Orioles. Robson went 0-for-7 in four big league games with Detroit and was outrighted off of the 40-man roster following the season on November 19.

In 2022, Robson played in 53 games for Triple-A Toledo, hitting .192/.318/.338 with three home runs, 17 RBI, and 13 stolen bases. He was released by the Tigers organization on July 30.

=== Kansas City Monarchs ===
On August 6, 2022, Robson signed with the Kansas City Monarchs of the American Association of Professional Baseball. In 29 games, he hit .288/.403/.631 with nine home runs and 34 RBI.

Robson played in 69 games for the Monarchs in 2023, batting .250/.398/.470 with 10 home runs, 31 RBI, and 23 stolen bases. After the season, he became a free agent.

=== Gastonia Ghost Peppers ===
On April 18, 2024, Robson signed with the Gastonia Ghost Peppers of the Atlantic League of Professional Baseball. However, on April 25, he was placed on the retired list by the team. Robson was activated and came out of retirement on July 27. In 42 games for Gastonia, he slashed .277/.410/.526 with eight home runs, 27 RBI, and 18 stolen bases. Robson became a free agent following the season.

=== Winnipeg Goldeyes ===
On February 14, 2025, Robson signed with the Guerreros de Oaxaca of the Mexican League. However, he never appeared in a game for Oaxaca. On April 24, Robson signed with the Winnipeg Goldeyes of the American Association of Professional Baseball. In 94 appearances for Winnipeg, he batted .257/.340/.457 with 14 home runs, 52 RBI, and 30 stolen bases. He became a free agent following the season.

=== Long Island Ducks ===
On January 13, 2026, Robson signed with the Long Island Ducks of the Atlantic League of Professional Baseball.

== International career ==
Robson played for the Canadian national baseball team at the 2019 Pan American Games Qualifier and the 2023 World Baseball Classic.
