= Canada national baseball team =

National sports team

Information
- Country: Canada
- Federation: Baseball Canada
- Confederation: WBSC Americas
- Manager: Ernie Whitt
- Captain: Josh Naylor
- Team Colors: Red, White, Black

WBSC ranking
- Current: 18 (26 October 2026)
- Highest: 6 (December 2012)

Olympic Games
- Appearances: 2 (first in 2004)
- Best result: 4 (2004)

World Baseball Classic
- Appearances: 6 (first in 2006)
- Best result: 6th (2026)

WBSC Premier12
- Appearances: 2 (first in 2015)
- Best result: 5 (2015)

World Cup
- Appearances: 17 (first in 1970)
- Best result: Bronze (2: 2009, 2011)

Intercontinental Cup
- Appearances: 4 (first in 1973)
- Best result: 5 (1973)

Pan American Games
- Appearances: 11 (first in 1967)
- Best result: Gold (2: 2011, 2015)

The Canada national baseball team (French: Équipe du Canada de baseball masculin) represents Canada in international baseball. They are overseen by Baseball Canada, the governing body of baseball in Canada.

Canada was an inaugural member of the World Baseball Classic, making its debut in the first edition.

Team Canada competed in the 2026 World Baseball Classic in March 2026. The won Pool A and advanced to the quarterfinals for the first time. They were eliminated in the quarterfinals by the United States.

== History ==
Cross-border baseball games had been played between Canadian and American team as early as 1856, though these were played by clubs and thus not necessarily true internationals.

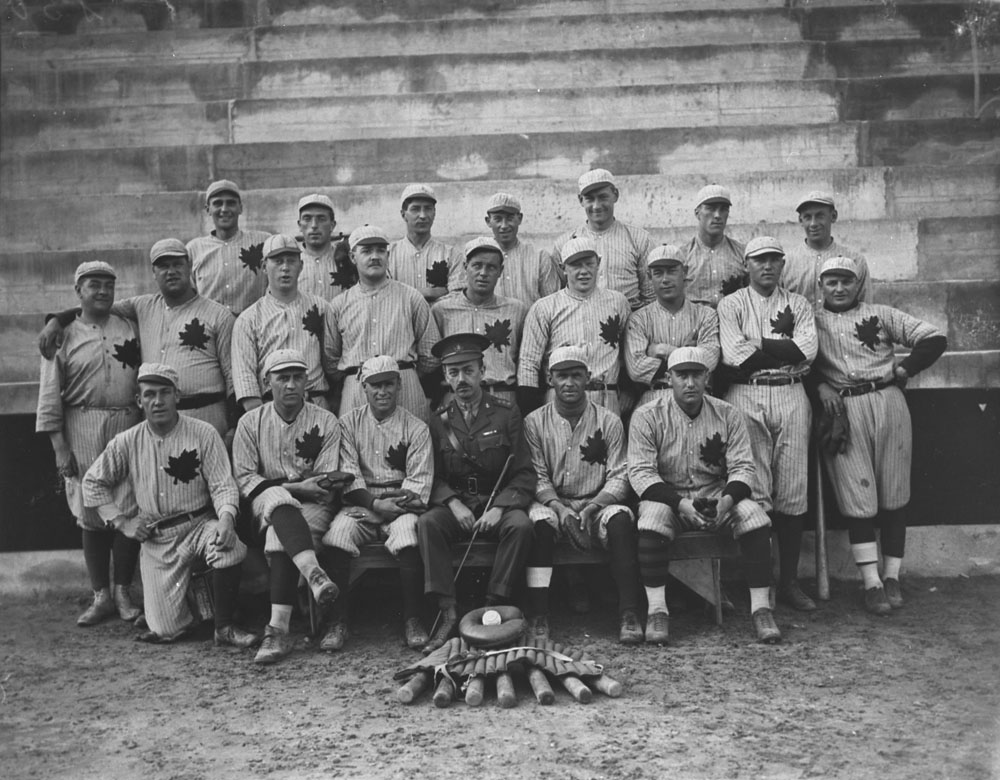
Canada debuted at the 1919 Inter-Allied Games in France

The first true national selection to represent Canada in international competition appeared at the Inter-Allied Games, a replacement for the Summer Olympics held in 1919 following the conclusion of the First World War. The players were all members of the Canadian Expeditionary Force, many of them from the army league's champion team. They played a selection of American servicemen in a four-game series, losing three and taking one.

For the next few decades, Canada was only occasionally represented at international baseball events, including by several semi-pro clubs at the Global World Series contests of 1955 to 1957.

Baseball Canada identifies the first Canadian national team as the squad assembled for the 1967 Pan American Games, held on home soil in Winnipeg. The team was managed on the field by Gerry Mackay, who became a longtime skipper of the national team. However, four Canadian players (including future Canadian Baseball Hall of Fame pitcher Ron Stead) were controversially disqualified due to previously having played professional baseball (since professionalism was banned at the time by the International Olympic Committee). Canada ultimately went 1–5 in the tournament.

Canada made its debut in the Amateur World Series (later known as the Baseball World Cup) in the 1970 tournament. On the 1970 team was Dave McKay, a future Toronto Blue Jay.

=== Olympic appearances ===
Canada was invited to participate at the 1984 Summer Olympics. They finished with a 1–2 record in pool play, and did not advance to the knockout round. They finished tied for third in their pool, the equivalent of a tie for fifth overall.

Canada qualified for the 1988 Summer Olympics by finishing in fourth place at the 1987 Pan American Games and defeating 1987 European Baseball Championship silver medalist Italy in a playoff. They finished with a 1–2 record in pool play, and did not advance to the knockout round. They finished in seventh place overall.

Canada qualified for the 2004 Summer Olympics by finishing second at the Americas Olympic Qualifying Tournament in Panama. They finished with a 5–2 record in pool play, then fell to Cuba in the semifinals. Canada would ultimately lose the bronze medal game 11–2 to Japan.

Canada qualified for the 2008 Summer Olympics by finishing first in the Final Qualifying Tournament. They finished with 2–5 record in pool play, and did not advance to the knockout round.

=== World Baseball Classic era ===
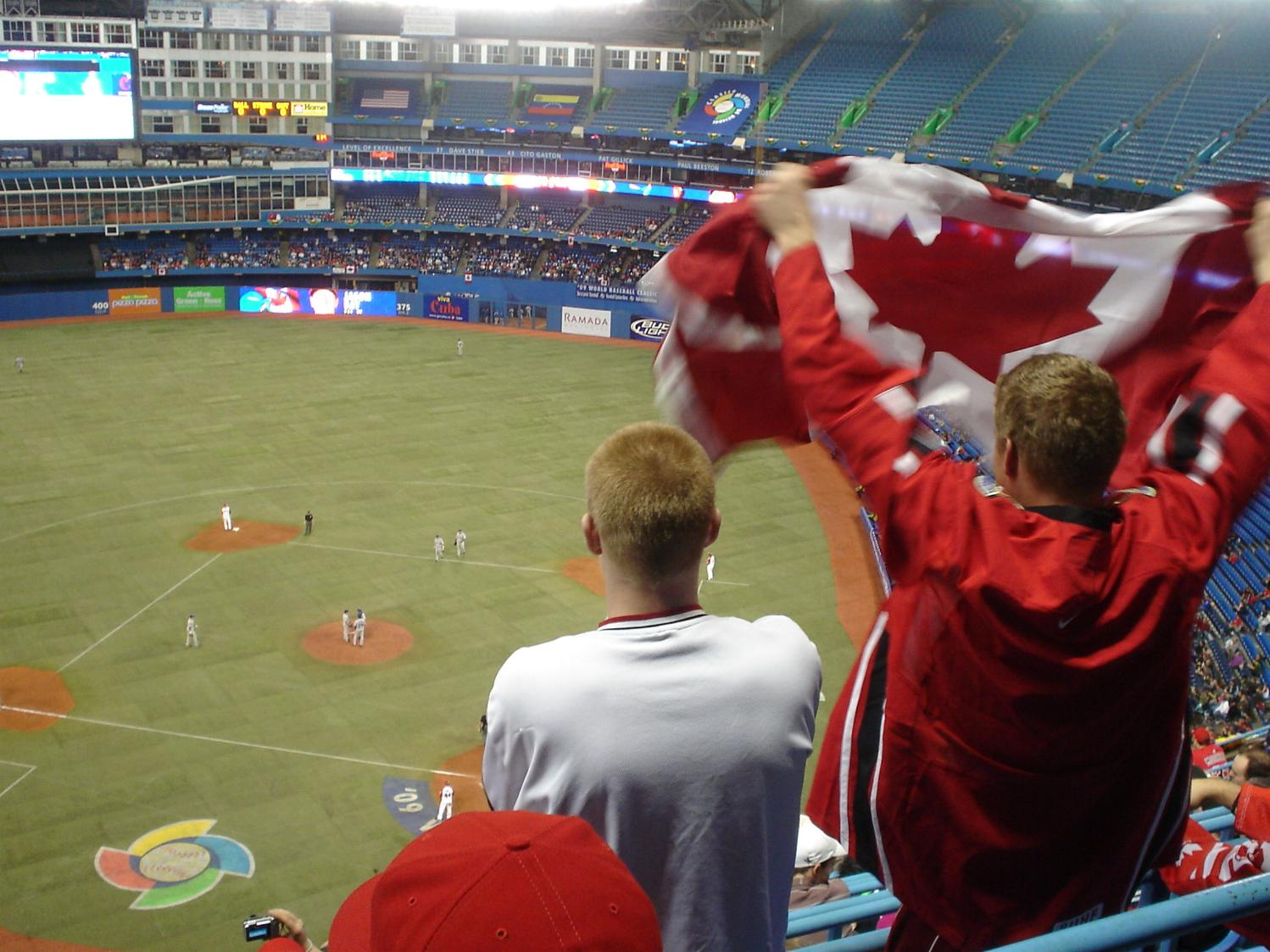
Team Canada plays at the 2009 WBC as hosting fans cheer the players on

In June 2005, Major League Baseball announced the formation of the World Baseball Classic (WBC), an international competition to be held in March 2006 for the first time. Canada was one of the sixteen teams invited to play in the inaugural classic. Because the event will be held in March, before the North American baseball season traditionally starts, players active in Major League Baseball or any minor league affiliates are eligible to play in the WBC, making the team markedly different from the teams which represented Canada in the 2005 World Cup or the 2004 Olympics.

==== 2006 WBC: Inaugural classic ====
Several high-profile Canadian players declined the opportunity to participate, including Ryan Dempster, Shawn Hill, Danny Klassen, Éric Gagné and Rich Harden, who were injured. Los Angeles Dodgers' prospect Russell Martin was named to the team, but pulled out in favor of reporting to Spring training. In addition, Larry Walker, who retired after the 2005 season, opted not to participate, choosing instead to serve in a coaching capacity.

Canada played in Pool B of the tournament with Mexico, South Africa and the United States.

Team Canada was heavily favoured to win their first game against South Africa, a team made up almost entirely by amateurs. However, South Africa put up a tough challenge to the Canadian team. South African starter, Carl Michaels pitched outstandingly; Canada could not get a run until the 5th inning, when they scored 3. However, the South Africans shockingly scored 4 runs of their own in the bottom of the 5th against Paul Quantrill. It was back and forth from then on. It looked like South Africa might pull off a monumental upset as they went into the 9th with an 8–7 lead. However, in the top of the 9th, the Canadians scored 4 times to win the game 11–8.

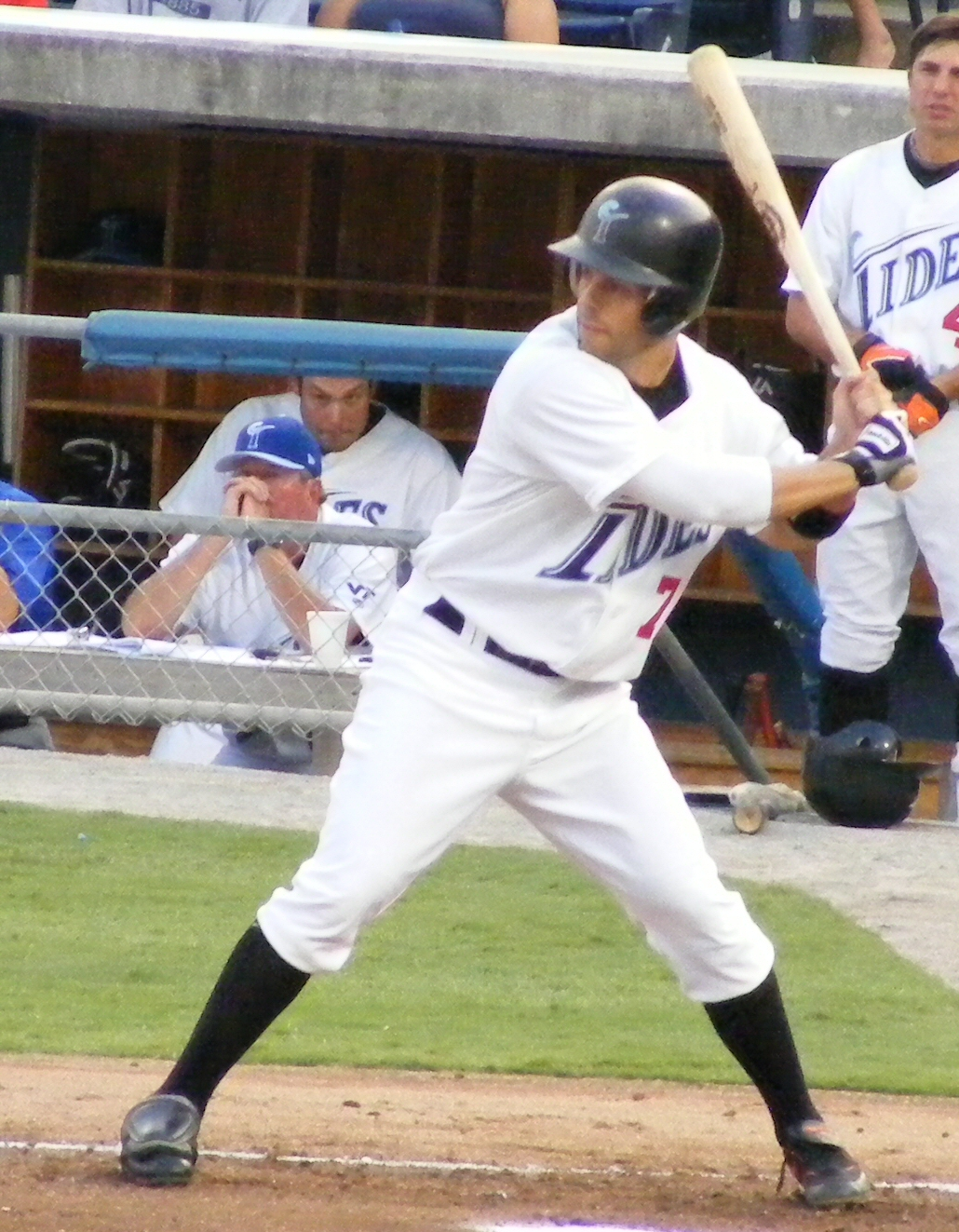
Adam Stern

After almost being upset by a surprising South African team, Canada pulled off an upset of its own with an 8–6 victory over the star-studded United States team. Scoring in each of the first five innings, the Canadians built an 8–0 lead using a combination of timely, patient hitting, steady pitching and clutch fielding. In the bottom of the fifth, the United States threatened a comeback, exploding for 6 runs, capped off by a Jason Varitek grand slam. The Canadian team held off the US the rest of the way, as neither team crossed the plate again in the game. Adam Stern had a strong outing, going 3 for 4, a double shy of the cycle, with an inside-the-park home run, as well as making several spectacular plays in center field to keep his team ahead.

After Canada's victory over the United States, they got shocked by the Mexican team in a 9–1 resounding defeat. Unfortunately for the Canadian side, this victory would eventually cost them the trip to the 2nd round of the tournament after the United States beat South Africa 17–0 and clinched the second place in Pool B. Canada, USA, and Mexico each finished with a 2–1 record in the pool, but Canada lost the tie-breaker based on runs allowed.

==== 2009 WBC: First classic held on home soil ====
Canada was placed in 2009 World Baseball Classic – Pool C hosting the United States, Italy, and Venezuela at Rogers Centre in Toronto. In their opener, Canada lost a close game against the United States by a score of 6–5. On March 9, Canada was eliminated from the tournament after losing 6–2 to underdog Italy. Canada exited the WBC with an 0–2 record and 6.35 runs allowed per 9 innings, to secure thirteenth place overall.

==== 2013 WBC: Brawl vs Mexico ====
Canada qualified by winning a qualifying tournament in Armin-Wolf-Arena in Regensburg, Germany, in September 2012, that also featured the Czech Republic, Germany and Great Britain. Canada moved on to the 1st Round.

The Canadian team was placed in 2013 World Baseball Classic – Pool D against Italy, Mexico and the United States. In their opener, Canada lost to the Italian baseball team 14–4 after the game ended in the 8th inning due to the mercy rule in place after Italy scored five additional runs during the bottom of the 8th inning. On March 9, Canada faced off against Mexico. With Canada already leading the game, third baseman Luis Cruz motioned the pitcher Arnold Leon to bean the next batter, Rene Tosoni, which resulted in a bench clearing brawl. Seven players from both teams ejected from the game. Despite this, they clinched a 10–3 win over Mexico. They lost the final game against the United States 9–4, thus eliminating Canada from the tournament.

The Canadian team missed out on advancing to the next round for the third time, but still managed to claim their automatic qualification for the 2017 World Baseball Classic.

==== 2017 WBC: Worst finish ====
Canada was placed in 2017 World Baseball Classic – Pool C against the Dominican Republic, Colombia, and the United States. Their performances were abysmal, even losing to surprising debutants Colombia.

After losing all three of its matches, they finished last in their group, and were forced to go through qualifiers for the 2023 World Baseball Classic.

==== 2023 WBC ====
Canada automatically qualified for the 2023 tournament by playing in the 2017 World Baseball Classic.

The Canadian team was placed in 2023 World Baseball Classic – Pool C against Great Britain, United States, Colombia and Mexico. They began pool play against Great Britain. The Canadians had to overcome an early deficit, however, Tyler O’Neill and Jacob Robson had four hits each to lead Canada to an 18–8 mercy rule win In Game 2, propelled by a nine-run first inning, they lost 1–12 against the United States. In Game 3 against Columbia, Canada led 1–0 going into the eighth inning, but Otto Lopez, a Toronto Blue Jays prospect, led off the inning with a triple and was driven in by Owen Caissie's two-out RBI single to push the lead to 2–0. Lopez's three-run shot in the ninth gave Canada an even bigger cushion, which ultimately lead them to winning 5–0. Their 2–1 record set up a win-or-go-home game vs Mexico. After a good start to the game, Mexico blew the game open with a four-run sixth, keyed by Randy Arozarena’s three-run double. They would go on to win the game 10–3, ultimately eliminating Canada from the tournament.

By finishing top four in their group, Canada still managed to claim their automatic qualification spot for the 2026 World Baseball Classic.

==== 2026 WBC ====
Canada advanced to the quarter-finals for the first time in WBC history.

== Results and fixtures ==
The following is a list of professional baseball match results currently active in the latest version of the WBSC World Rankings, as well as any future matches that have been scheduled.

Legend

Win Lose Void or postponed Fixture

=== 2023 ===
| World Baseball Classic GS | March 12 | Great Britain | 8–18 (F/7) | Canada | Phoenix, United States |
| World Baseball Classic GS | 12:00 MT | LP: Akeel Morris (0–1); HR: Harry Ford (1) | Boxscore | WP: Phillippe Aumont (1–0); HR: Edouard Julien (1), Owen Caissie (1) | Attendance: 11,555; Umpires: HP – Felix Tejada, 1B – Bill Miller, 2B – Jhonatan Biarreta, 3B – Carlos Torres |

| World Baseball Classic GS | March 13 | Canada | 1–12 (F/7) | United States | Phoenix, United States |
| World Baseball Classic GS | 19:00 MT | LP: Mitch Bratt (0–1); HR: Jared Young (1) | Boxscore | WP: Lance Lynn (1–0); HR: Mike Trout (1), Trea Turner (1) | Attendance: 29,621; Umpires: HP – Bill Miller, 1B – Edwin Louisa, 2B – Alan Porter, 3B – Jairo Mendoza |

| World Baseball Classic GS | March 14 | Canada | 5–0 | Colombia | Phoenix, United States |
| World Baseball Classic GS | 12:00 MT | WP: Noah Skirrow (1–0); HR: Otto Lopez (1) | Boxscore | LP: Adrian Almeida (0–1) | Attendance: 10,571; Umpires: HP: Doug Eddings. 1B: Alan Porter. 2B: Jairo Mendoza. 3B: Edwin Louisa |

| World Baseball Classic GS | March 15 | Mexico | 10–3 | Canada | Phoenix, United States |
| World Baseball Classic GS | 12:00 MT | WP: José Urquidy (1–0); HR: Rowdy Tellez (1) | Boxscore | LP: Rob Zastryzny (0–1); HR: Bo Naylor (1), Edouard Julien (2) | Attendance: 17,245; Umpires: HP – Carlos Torres, 1B – Doug Eddings, 2B – Jhonathan Biarreta, 3B – Edwin Louisa |

| Pan Am Games Q | June 16 | Canada | 6–5 (F/8) | Panama | Buenos Aires, Argentina |
| Pan Am Games Q | 11:00 ART | | Boxscore | | Attendance: 300 |

| Pan Am Games Q | June 17 | Argentina | 8–3 | Canada | Buenos Aires, Argentina |
| Pan Am Games Q | 15:00 ART | | Boxscore | | Attendance: 785 |

| Pan Am Games Q | June 19 | Canada | 11–1 | Peru | Buenos Aires, Argentina |
| Pan Am Games Q | 11:00 ART | | Boxscore | | Attendance: 150 |

| Pan Am Games Q | June 20 | Honduras | 0–10 (F/5) | Canada | Buenos Aires, Argentina |
| Pan Am Games Q | 11:00 ART | | Boxscore | | Attendance: 100 |

=== 2026 ===
| World Baseball Classic GS | March 7 | Colombia | 2–8 | Canada | San Juan, Puerto Rico |
| World Baseball Classic GS | 12:00 AST | LP: Austin Bergner | Boxscore | WP: Michael Soroka; HR: Owen Caissie | Attendance: 10,293 |

| World Baseball Classic GS | March 8 | Panama | 4–3 | Canada | San Juan, Puerto Rico |
| World Baseball Classic GS | 19:00 AST | WP: Miguel Cienfuegos; Sv: Darío Agrazal | Boxscore | LP: James Paxton | Attendance: 15,649 |

| World Baseball Classic GS | March 10 | Canada | 3-2 | Puerto Rico | San Juan, Puerto Rico |
| World Baseball Classic GS | 19:00 AST | WP: Jordan Balazovic; Sv: Brock Dykxhoorn | Boxscore | LP: José De León | Attendance: 18,997 |

| World Baseball Classic GS | March 11 | Canada | 7–2 | Cuba | San Juan, Puerto Rico |
| World Baseball Classic GS | 15:00 AST | WP: Cal Quantrill; HR: Abraham Toro | Boxscore | LP: Liván Moinelo | Attendance: 10,610 |

| World Baseball Classic QF | March 13 | United States | 5-3 | Canada | Houston, Texas |
| World Baseball Classic QF | 19:00 CDT | WP: Logan Webb; Sv: Mason Miller | Boxscore | LP: Michael Soroka; HR: Bo Naylor | Attendance: 38,054 |

== Team ==
=== Current roster ===
The roster for the 2026 World Baseball Classic:

Canada roster – 2026 World Baseball Classic roster
| Active roster | | Coaches |
| Pitchers: 14 Antoine Jean; 16 Jordan Balazovic; 22 Logan Allen; 25 Noah Skirrow; 35 Matt Wilkinson; 37 Phillippe Aumont; 40 Michael Soroka; 44 Brock Dykxhoorn; 47 Cal Quantrill; 50 Jameson Taillon; 52 Indigo Diaz; 57 Micah Ashman; 58 Rob Zastryzny; 64 Adam Macko; 65 James Paxton; 87 Eric Cerantola | Catchers: 23 Bo Naylor; 34 Liam Hicks; Infielders: 2 Adam Hall; 6 Otto Lopez; 7 Tyler Black; 12 Josh Naylor; 15 Edouard Julien; 24 Matt Davidson; 31 Abraham Toro; Outfielders: 1 Denzel Clarke; 8 Jacob Robson; 9 Tyler O'Neill; 21 Owen Caissie; 29 Jared Young | Manager: 26 Ernie Whitt; Coaches: 45 Paul Quantrill (Pitching); 35 Denis Boucher (Bullpen); 22 Jordan Procyshen (Bullpen Catcher); 10 Greg Hamilton (Bench); 33 Justin Morneau (Hitting); 55 Russell Martin (First Base); 11 Stubby Clapp (Third Base) |
Updated: February 6, 2026

== Competitive record ==
=== World Baseball Classic ===
| World Baseball Classic record | | | | | | | Qualification record | | | |
| Year | Round | Position | W | L | RS | RA | W | L | RS | RA |
|---|---|---|---|---|---|---|---|---|---|---|
| (United States) 2006 | Group stage | 9th | 2 | 1 | 20 | 23 | No qualifiers held | | | |
| (Canada) 2009 | Group stage | 13th | 0 | 2 | 7 | 12 | No qualifiers held | | | |
| (United States) 2013 | Group stage | 12th | 1 | 2 | 18 | 26 | 3 | 0 | 38 | 9 |
| (United States) 2017 | Group stage | 15th | 0 | 3 | 3 | 21 | Automatically qualified | | | |
| (United States) 2023 | Group stage | 12th | 2 | 2 | 27 | 30 | Automatically qualified | | | |
| (Puerto Rico) (United States) 2026 | Quarterfinals | 6th | 3 | 2 | 24 | 15 | Automatically qualified | | | |
| Total | Quarterfinals | 6/6 | 8 | 12 | 99 | 127 | 3 | 0 | 38 | 9 |

Canadian World Baseball Classic Record by opponent
| Opponent | Tournaments met | W-L record | Largest victory | | Largest defeat | | Current streak |
| Opponent | Tournaments met | W-L record | Score | Tournament | Score | Tournament | Current streak |
|---|---|---|---|---|---|---|---|
| Colombia | 3 | 2–1 | 8–2 | Puerto Rico 2026 | 4–1 | United States 2017 | W2 |
| Cuba | 1 | 1–0 | 7–2 | Puerto Rico 2026 | – | | W1 |
| Dominican Republic | 1 | 0–1 | – | | 9–2 | United States 2017 | L1 |
| Great Britain | 1 | 1–0 | 18–8 (F/7) | United States 2023 | – | | W1 |
| Italy | 2 | 0–2 | – | | 14–4 (F/8) | United States 2013 | L2 |
| Mexico | 3 | 1–2 | 10–3 | United States 2013 | 9–1 | United States 2006 | L1 |
| Panama | 1 | 0–1 | – | | 4–3 | Puerto Rico 2026 | L1 |
| Puerto Rico | 1 | 1–0 | 3–2 | Puerto Rico 2026 | – | | W1 |
| South Africa | 1 | 1–0 | 11–8 | United States 2006 | – | | W1 |
| United States | 6 | 1–5 | 8–6 | United States 2006 | 12–1 (F/7) | United States 2023 | L5 |
| Overall | 6 | 8–12 | Against GBR | | Against USA | | L1 |
| Overall | 6 | 8–12 | 18–8 (F/7) | United States 2023 | 12–1 (F/7) | United States 2023 | L1 |

Canadian World Baseball Classic Qualifiers Record by opponent
| Opponent | Tournaments met | W-L record | Largest victory | | Largest defeat | | Current streak |
| Opponent | Tournaments met | W-L record | Score | Tournament | Score | Tournament | Current streak |
|---|---|---|---|---|---|---|---|
| Germany | 1 | 2–0 | 11–1 (F/8) | Germany 2013 | – | | W2 |
| Great Britain | 1 | 1–0 | 11–1 (F/7) | Germany 2013 | – | | W1 |
| Overall | 1 | 3–0 | Against GBR | | – | | W3 |
| Overall | 1 | 3–0 | 11–1 (F/7) | Germany 2013 | – | – | W3 |

2006 WBC Results

| March 7; 1st Round, Pool B – Game 2 | Canada | 11–8 | South Africa | United States Scottsdale Stadium; Attendance: 5,829 |
| March 7; 1st Round, Pool B – Game 2 | | Boxscore | | United States Scottsdale Stadium; Attendance: 5,829 |

| March 8; 1st Round, Pool D – Game 3 | Canada | 8–6 | United States | United States Chase Field; Attendance: 16,993 |
| March 8; 1st Round, Pool D – Game 3 | | Boxscore | | United States Chase Field; Attendance: 16,993 |

| March 9; 1st Round, Pool D – Game 5 | Mexico | 9–1 | Canada | United States Chase Field; Attendance: 15,744 |
| March 9; 1st Round, Pool D – Game 5 | | Boxscore | | United States Chase Field; Attendance: 15,744 |

2009 WBC Results

| March 7; 1st Round, Pool C – Game 1 | Canada | 5–6 | United States | Canada Rogers Centre; Attendance: 42,314 |
| March 7; 1st Round, Pool C – Game 1 | | Boxscore | | Canada Rogers Centre; Attendance: 42,314 |

| March 9; 1st Round, Pool C – Game 4 | Italy | 6–2 | Canada | Canada Rogers Centre; Attendance: 12,411 |
| March 9; 1st Round, Pool C – Game 4 | | Boxscore | | Canada Rogers Centre; Attendance: 12,411 |

2013 WBC Results

| March 8; 1st Round, Pool D – Game 2 | Canada | 4–14 (F/8) | Italy | United States Chase Field; Attendance: 5,140 |
| March 8; 1st Round, Pool D – Game 2 | | Boxscore | | United States Chase Field; Attendance: 5,140 |

| March 9; 1st Round, Pool D – Game 4 | Canada | 10–3 | Mexico | United States Chase Field; Attendance: 19,581 |
| March 9; 1st Round, Pool D – Game 4 | | Boxscore | | United States Chase Field; Attendance: 19,581 |

| March 10; 1st Round, Pool D – Game 6 | United States | 9–4 | Canada | United States Chase Field; Attendance: 22,425 |
| March 10; 1st Round, Pool D – Game 6 | | Boxscore | | United States Chase Field; Attendance: 22,425 |

2017 WBC Results

| March 9; 1st Round, Pool C – Game 1 | Canada | 2–9 | Dominican Republic | United States Marlins Park; Attendance: 27,388 |
| March 9; 1st Round, Pool C – Game 1 | | Boxscore | | United States Marlins Park; Attendance: 27,388 |

| March 11; 1st Round, Pool C – Game 3 | Colombia | 4–1 | Canada | United States Marlins Park; Attendance: 17,209 |
| March 11; 1st Round, Pool C – Game 3 | | Boxscore | | United States Marlins Park; Attendance: 17,209 |

| March 12; 1st Round, Pool C – Game 6 | Canada | 0–8 | United States | United States Marlins Park; Attendance: 22,303 |
| March 12; 1st Round, Pool C – Game 6 | | Boxscore | | United States Marlins Park; Attendance: 22,303 |

2023 WBC Results

| March 12th 3:00 P.M. EST, 12:00 P.M. PST; Pool C, Game 1 | Great Britain | 8–18 (F/7) | Canada | Chase Field, Phoenix, Arizona; Attendance: 11,555 |
| March 12th 3:00 P.M. EST, 12:00 P.M. PST; Pool C, Game 1 | | Boxscore | | Chase Field, Phoenix, Arizona; Attendance: 11,555 |

| March 13th 10:00 P.M. EST, 7:00 P.M. PST; Pool C, Game 2 | Canada | 1–12 (F/7) | United States | Chase Field, Phoenix Arizona; Attendance: 29,621 |
| March 13th 10:00 P.M. EST, 7:00 P.M. PST; Pool C, Game 2 | | Boxscore | | Chase Field, Phoenix Arizona; Attendance: 29,621 |

| March 14th 3:00 P.M. EST, 12:00 P.M. PST; Pool C, Game 3 | Canada | 5–0 | Colombia | Chase Field, Phoenix Arizona; Attendance: 10,571 |
| March 14th 3:00 P.M. EST, 12:00 P.M. PST; Pool C, Game 3 | | Boxscore | | Chase Field, Phoenix Arizona; Attendance: 10,571 |

| March 15th 3:00 P.M. EST, 12:00 P.M. PST; Pool C, Game 4 | Mexico | 10–3 | Canada | Chase Field, Phoenix Arizona; Attendance: 17,245 |
| March 15th 3:00 P.M. EST, 12:00 P.M. PST; Pool C, Game 4 | | Boxscore | | Chase Field, Phoenix Arizona; Attendance: 17,245 |

=== Olympic Games ===
Canada has qualified for two Olympic Games, in 2004 and 2008. Canadian teams also competed twice when baseball was a demonstration sport, in 1984 and 1988.

| Summer Olympics record | | | | | | | Qualification |
| Year | Round | Position | W | L | RS | RA | Qualification |
|---|---|---|---|---|---|---|---|
| (United States) 1984 | Preliminary | 5th (tied) (Note: No medals awarded; tournament was a demonstration sport only) | 1 | 2 | 10 | 11 | |
| (South Korea) 1988 | Preliminary | 5th (tied) | 1 | 2 | 17 | 19 | 4th, 1987 Pan American Games defeated 1987 European Baseball Championship silver medalist Italy in a playoff |
| (Spain) 1992 | did not qualify | | | | | | 8th, 1991 Pan American Games |
| (United States) 1996 | did not qualify | | | | | | |
| (Australia) 2000 | did not qualify | | | | | | 1999 Pan American Games |
| (Greece) 2004 | Finals | 4th | 5 | 4 | 46 | 36 | 2004 Americas Olympic Baseball Qualifying Tournament |
| (China) 2008 | Preliminary | 6th | 2 | 5 | 26 | 23 | 4th, American Qualifying Tournament; Final Qualifying Tournament |
| (Japan) 2020 | did not qualify | | | | | | 7th, 2019 Premier12; 4th, Americas Qualifying Event |
| (United States) 2028 | did not qualify | | | | | | 6th 2026 World Baseball Classic |
| Total (Note: Totals only include years 1992 to 2020, during which baseball was an official medal sport.) | Finals | 2/7 | 7 | 9 | 72 | 59 | |

=== WBSC Premier12 ===
==== 2015 WBSC Premier12: Inaugural event ====
Canada was placed in Pool A against Cuba, Netherlands, Puerto Rico, Italy, and host Chinese Taipei. They completed a perfect 5–0 pool play to advance to the playoff stage. They ultimately lost to Mexico 4–3 in the quarter-finals, finishing in fifth place overall.

==== 2019 WBSC Premier12: Stiffer competition ====
Two quota spots were allocated from the Tournament, of the spots for six baseball teams at the 2020 Olympic Games.

Canada was placed in Pool C against Australia, Cuba, and host South Korea. They compiled a 1–2 pool play record, and did not advance to the Super Round. They finished in seventh place overall

=== Amateur World Series and Baseball World Cup ===
Canada Baseball World Cup

Amateur World Series
- Colombia, 1970: 9th (tie)
- Cuba, 1971: 6th (tie)
- Nicaragua, 1972: 9th
- Nicaragua, 1973: 6th (tie)
- United States, 1974: 4th (tie)
- Italy, 1978: 9th
- Japan, 1980: 5th
- South Korea, 1982: 5th

World Cup
- Italy, 1988: 5th
- Canada, 1990: 8th
- Nicaragua, 1994: 14th
- Italy, 1998: 6th in Pool B
- Taiwan, 2001: 6th in Pool B
- Cuba, 2003: 5th in Pool A
- Netherlands, 2005: 5th in Pool A
- Taiwan, 2007: 9th
- Europe, 2009: 3rd
- Panama, 2011: 3rd

Medal Tally
- Gold: -
- Silver: -
- Bronze: 2
- Rank: 14th

Canada has competed at 9 World Cups and 8 more times in its predecessor the Amateur World series. Their best finish was a bronze at the 2009 World Cup and at the 2011 World Cup.

=== Pan American Games ===
Canada's first appearance at the Pan American Games came in 1967. Their first medal came in 1999, when the team won the bronze medal for their third-place finish. In 2011, Canada won the gold medal game over the United States, 2–1, to win Canada's first-ever baseball gold medal. Canada won their second consecutive gold medal in 2015, defeating the United States, 7–6 (10 innings), in the final. In 2019, Canada won the silver medal, losing to Puerto Rico in the final match.

- 1951 : Did not qualify
- 1955 : Did not qualify
- 1959 : Did not qualify
- 1963 : Did not qualify
- 1967 : 5th
- 1971 : 4th

- 1975 : 7th
- 1979 : 8th
- 1983 : 6th
- 1987 : 4th
- 1991 : 8th
- 1995 : Did not qualify

- 1999 : (silver) 3rd
- 2003 : Did not qualify
- 2007 : Did not qualify
- 2011 : (gold) 1st
- 2015 : (gold) 1st
- 2019 : (silver) 2nd
- 2023: Did not qualify

== Uniforms ==
| Home | Away |

== See also ==
- List of Major League Baseball players from Canada
- World Port Tournament
