= Cale Iorg =

American baseball player (born 1985)

- Shortstop
- Born: September 6, 1985 (age 40); Toronto, Ontario, Canada
- Bats: Right Throws: Right
- Stats at Baseball Reference

Garth Cale Iorg (born September 6, 1985) is a Canadian-born American former professional baseball player. He is the son of former Major League Baseball (MLB) player Garth Iorg and nephew of former MLB player Dane Iorg. Iorg played college baseball for the Alabama Crimson Tide. After his freshman season at Alabama, Iorg put his baseball career on hold to go on a Mormon mission to Lisbon, Portugal. He was drafted by the Detroit Tigers shortly before he returned from the mission. Iorg was ranked as the third best prospect in the Tigers organization by Baseball America following the 2008 season.

== High school and college ==
Iorg was a four-year starter at Karns High School near Knoxville, Tennessee. As a junior, he batted .489 with 20 RBI and 19 stolen bases. In his senior season, he batted .495 with 15 home runs and 57 RBI, while compiling a .698 on-base percentage and a 1.131 slugging mark. He also scored 52 runs and stole 34 of 36 bases. In his freshman and only season at Alabama, Iorg batted .280 with an on-base percentage of .331 and slugging percentage of .415 as the Crimson Tide's starting shortstop.

== Mission for The Church of Jesus Christ of Latter-day Saints ==
After his freshman season at Alabama, Iorg served as a missionary for The Church of Jesus Christ of Latter-day Saints to Lisbon, Portugal. He told The Birmingham News that leaving Alabama had nothing to do with baseball. It was a matter of faith. While in Portugal, Iorg had little time for baseball. He had time to work out for about 30 minutes per day during the mission and once a week he had additional free time in which he often played soccer. While on the mission, Iorg was drafted by the Detroit Tigers in the sixth round (211th overall) of the 2007 Major League Baseball draft. He returned from Portugal on July 14, 2007.

== Minor leagues ==
Iorg began his professional career playing a total of eight games for the Gulf Coast Tigers and Lakeland Flying Tigers in 2007. The Tigers sent him to play Hawaii Winter Baseball for the North Shore Honu to work on his hitting. His winter season was cut short when he injured his hamstring in mid-October.

In 2011, Iorg played 26 games with the Detroit Tigers' Double-A affiliate Erie SeaWolves, and 88 games with the Triple-A Toledo Mud Hens. In 2012, he played 7 games with the Class-A Lakeland Flying Tigers, and 47 games with the Mud Hens.

At the end of the 2013 spring training season, the Tigers attempted to trade Iorg to the Baltimore Orioles, and when that fell through the Tigers released him. The Orioles signed him to a minor league contract on April 9, and assigned him to the Double-A Bowie Baysox.

On June 6, 2013, he announced his retirement from baseball.
