= Minoru Nakamura =

Japanese baseball player (1938–2021)

- Pitcher
- Born: September 28, 1938; Ise, Mie, Japan
- Died: June 2, 2021 (aged 82)
- Batted: Right Threw: Right

NPB debut
- 1957, for the Yomiuri Giants

Last NPB appearance
- 1969, for the Yomiuri Giants

Career statistics
- Win-Loss: 72-53
- ERA: 2.76
- Strikeouts: 649
- Stats at Baseball Reference

Teams
- Yomiuri Giants (1957–1969)

Minoru Nakamura (中村 稔, Nakamura Minoru; September 28, 1938 – June 2, 2021) was a former Japanese Nippon Professional Baseball pitcher. He played for the Yomiuri Giants from 1957 to 1969. He won 72 games in 13 seasons, winning a career high 20 games in 1965.

== Career ==
Nakamura pitched in Nippon Professional Baseball (NPB) for the Yomiuri Giants from 1957 to 1969. He joined the team after graduating from Uji Yamada Commerce High School. His most successful season came in 1961, when he logged a 17-10 record and 2.13 ERA in 63 appearances for the Giants. In 1965, Nakamura won 20 games for the team, a career-high, recording a 2.21 ERA in 45 games. He retired as an active player following the 1969 season. He finished his career with a 72-53 record and a 2.76 ERA with 649 strikeouts in 1,242.2 innings pitched across 352 appearances.

Nakamura worked as a pitching coach for the Giants and the Chiba Lotte Marines after his playing career ended.

== Personal life ==
Nakamura died on June 2, 2021, aged 82.
