= 2017 World Baseball Classic Pool C =

Pool C of the First Round of the 2017 World Baseball Classic was held at Marlins Park, Miami, Florida, United States, from March 9 to 12, 2017, between Canada, Colombia, the Dominican Republic, and the United States. Pool C was a round-robin tournament. Each team played the other three teams once, with the top two teams – the Dominican Republic and the United States – advancing to Pool F, one of two second-round pools. Manny Machado of the Dominican Republic was named MVP for the first-round Pool C bracket of the WBC, after batting .357.

== Standings ==
Pos	Team	Pld	W	L	RF	RA	RD	PCT	GB	Qualification
1	Dominican Republic	3	3	0	26	10	+16	1.000	—	Advance to second round
2	United States (H)	3	2	1	16	9	+7	.667	1	Advance to second round
3	Colombia	3	1	2	9	14	−5	.333	2	
4	Canada	3	0	3	3	21	−18	.000	3	

Rules for classification: Tiebreakers
(H) Hosts

Pool C MVP: (Dominican Republic) Manny Machado

== Results ==
- Times from March 9 to 11 are Eastern Standard Time (UTC−05:00) and times of March 12 are Eastern Daylight Time (UTC−04:00).

=== Dominican Republic 9, Canada 2 ===
March 9, 18:00 at Marlins Park
Team	1	2	3	4	5	6	7	8	9	R	H	E
Canada	0	0	1	0	1	0	0	0	0	2	6	1
Dominican Republic	0	4	0	0	1	3	1	0	X	9	15	1
WP: Carlos Martínez (1−0) LP: Ryan Dempster (0−1); Home runs: CAN: None; DOM: Welington Castillo (1), José Bautista (1); Attendance: 27,388 (74.5%); Umpires: HP − Dan Iassogna, 1B − Mark Wegner, 2B − Edwin Hernández, 3B − Jesús Miller; Boxscore

=== United States 3, Colombia 2 ===
March 10, 18:00 at Marlins Park (F/10)
Team	1	2	3	4	5	6	7	8	9	10	R	H	E
Colombia	0	0	0	0	2	0	0	0	0	0	2	5	0
United States	0	0	0	0	0	2	0	0	0	1	3	6	0
WP: Tyler Clippard (1−0) LP: Guillermo Moscoso (0−1); Attendance: 22,580 (61.5%); Umpires: HP − Tripp Gibson, 1B − Jesús Miller, 2B − Dan Iassogna, 3B − Edgar Estivision; Notes: Two outs when winning run scored. Boxscore

=== Colombia 4, Canada 1 ===
March 11, 12:00 at Marlins Park
Team	1	2	3	4	5	6	7	8	9	R	H	E
Colombia	0	0	1	0	1	1	0	0	1	4	11	0
Canada	1	0	0	0	0	0	0	0	0	1	5	1
WP: Julio Teherán (1−0) LP: Ryan Kellogg (0−1) Sv: Dayán Díaz (1); Attendance: 17,209 (46.8%); Umpires: HP − Edwin Hernández, 1B − Dan Iassogna, 2B − Tripp Gibson, 3B − Edgar Estivision; Boxscore

=== Dominican Republic 7, United States 5 ===
March 11, 18:30 at Marlins Park
Team	1	2	3	4	5	6	7	8	9	R	H	E
United States	0	0	2	1	0	2	0	0	0	5	8	0
Dominican Republic	0	0	0	0	0	2	1	4	X	7	10	2
WP: Álex Colomé (1−0) LP: Andrew Miller (0−1) Sv: Jeurys Familia (1); Home runs: USA: None; DOM: Manny Machado (1), Nelson Cruz (1), Starling Marte (1); Attendance: 37,446 (101.9%); Umpires: HP − Mark Wegner, 1B − Edgar Estivision, 2B − Tripp Gibson, 3B − Jesús Miller; Boxscore

The crowd of 37,446 set a baseball attendance record for Marlins Park, surpassing Opening Day of the 2014 Major League Baseball season.

=== Dominican Republic 10, Colombia 3 ===
March 12, 12:30 at Marlins Park (F/11)
Team	1	2	3	4	5	6	7	8	9	10	11	R	H	E
Dominican Republic	1	0	2	0	0	0	0	0	0	0	7	10	14	2
Colombia	1	0	0	0	0	1	0	1	0	0	0	3	6	2
WP: Enny Romero (1−0) LP: William Cuevas (0−1); Home runs: DOM: None; COL: Jorge Alfaro (1); Attendance: 36,952 (100.6%); Umpires: HP − Tripp Gibson, 1B − Jesús Miller, 2B − Mark Wegner, 3B − Edwin Hernández; Notes: Extra inning rule was used in 11th inning. Boxscore

=== United States 8, Canada 0 ===
March 12, 19:00 at Marlins Park
Team	1	2	3	4	5	6	7	8	9	R	H	E
Canada	0	0	0	0	0	0	0	0	0	0	4	2
United States	3	4	0	0	0	0	1	0	X	8	11	0
WP: Danny Duffy (1−0) LP: Ryan Dempster (0−2); Home runs: CAN: None; USA: Nolan Arenado (1), Buster Posey (1); Attendance: 22,303 (60.7%); Umpires: HP − Dan Iassogna, 1B − Edwin Hernández, 2B − Edgar Estivision, 3B − Mark Wegner; Boxscore
