= José Caballero (baseball) =

Panamanian baseball player (born 1996)

- Caballero with the New York Yankees in 2025

New York Yankees – No. 72
- Utility player
- Born: August 30, 1996 (age 30); Las Tablas, Los Santos, Panama
- Bats: Right Throws: Right

MLB debut
- April 15, 2023, for the Seattle Mariners

MLB statistics (through 2026 season)
- Batting average: .229
- Home runs: 32
- Runs batted in: 157
- Stolen bases: 153
- Stats at Baseball Reference

Teams
- Seattle Mariners (2023); Tampa Bay Rays (2024–2025); New York Yankees (2025–present)

Career highlights and awards
- 2× AL stolen base leader (2024, 2025)

José Manuel Ortega Caballero (born August 30, 1996) is a Panamanian professional baseball utility player for the New York Yankees of Major League Baseball (MLB). He has previously played in MLB for the Seattle Mariners and Tampa Bay Rays. Caballero made his MLB debut in 2023 with the Mariners. He led the American League (AL) in stolen bases in 2024 and all of MLB in 2025.

== Early life and career ==
Caballero grew up in Las Tablas. He hoped to sign a professional baseball contract when he turned 16, but broke his left leg, requiring three surgeries, which led Major League Baseball (MLB) teams not to sign him.

Caballero enrolled at Chipola College in 2015. In 2017, he led the school's baseball team to the JUCO World Series championship and was named the most valuable player of the tournament.

== Professional career ==
=== Arizona Diamondbacks ===
The Arizona Diamondbacks selected Caballero in the seventh round, with the 202nd overall selection, of the 2017 Major League Baseball draft. He made his professional debut with the rookie-level Missoula Osprey.

In 2018, Caballero split the year between the Low-A Hillsboro Hops and High-A Kane County Cougars, hitting a cumulative .292/.378/.468 with 9 home runs, 40 RBI, and 17 stolen bases across 70 total games. For the 2019 season, he began the year playing for the High-A Visalia Rawhide, posting a .268/.388/.396 with 3 home runs, 12 RBI, and 28 stolen bases in 43 contests.

=== Seattle Mariners ===
On July 31, 2019, the Diamondbacks traded Caballero to the Seattle Mariners in exchange for Mike Leake. Caballero played in 23 games for the High-A Modesto Nuts, slashing .256/.339/.333 with no home runs, 10 RBI, and 4 stolen bases. He did not play in a game in 2020 due to the cancellation of the minor league season because of the COVID-19 pandemic.

Caballero split the 2021 season between the rookie-level Arizona Complex League Mariners, High-A Everett AquaSox, and Double-A Arkansas Travelers. In 20 games, he hit .258/.385/.484 with 3 home runs, 15 RBI, and 11 stolen bases. In 2022, he played in 31 games for Double-A Arkansas, batting .227/.440/.330 with 2 home runs, 12 RBI, and 15 stolen bases. He was assigned to the Triple-A Tacoma Rainiers to begin the 2023 season.

On April 15, 2023, Caballero was selected to the 40-man roster and promoted to the major leagues for the first time. He made his MLB debut that night as a defensive substitution, replacing J. P. Crawford at shortstop in the ninth inning against the Colorado Rockies. On April 19, 2023, he recorded his first hit, a stand-up double off Eric Lauer of the Milwaukee Brewers. Caballero began seeing more playing time at second base as veteran Kolten Wong struggled. On May 21, 2023, he hit his first major league home run off Nick Anderson of the Atlanta Braves, in the process becoming only the second Mariner after Mike Cameron to record a homer and three stolen bases in the same game.

=== Tampa Bay Rays ===
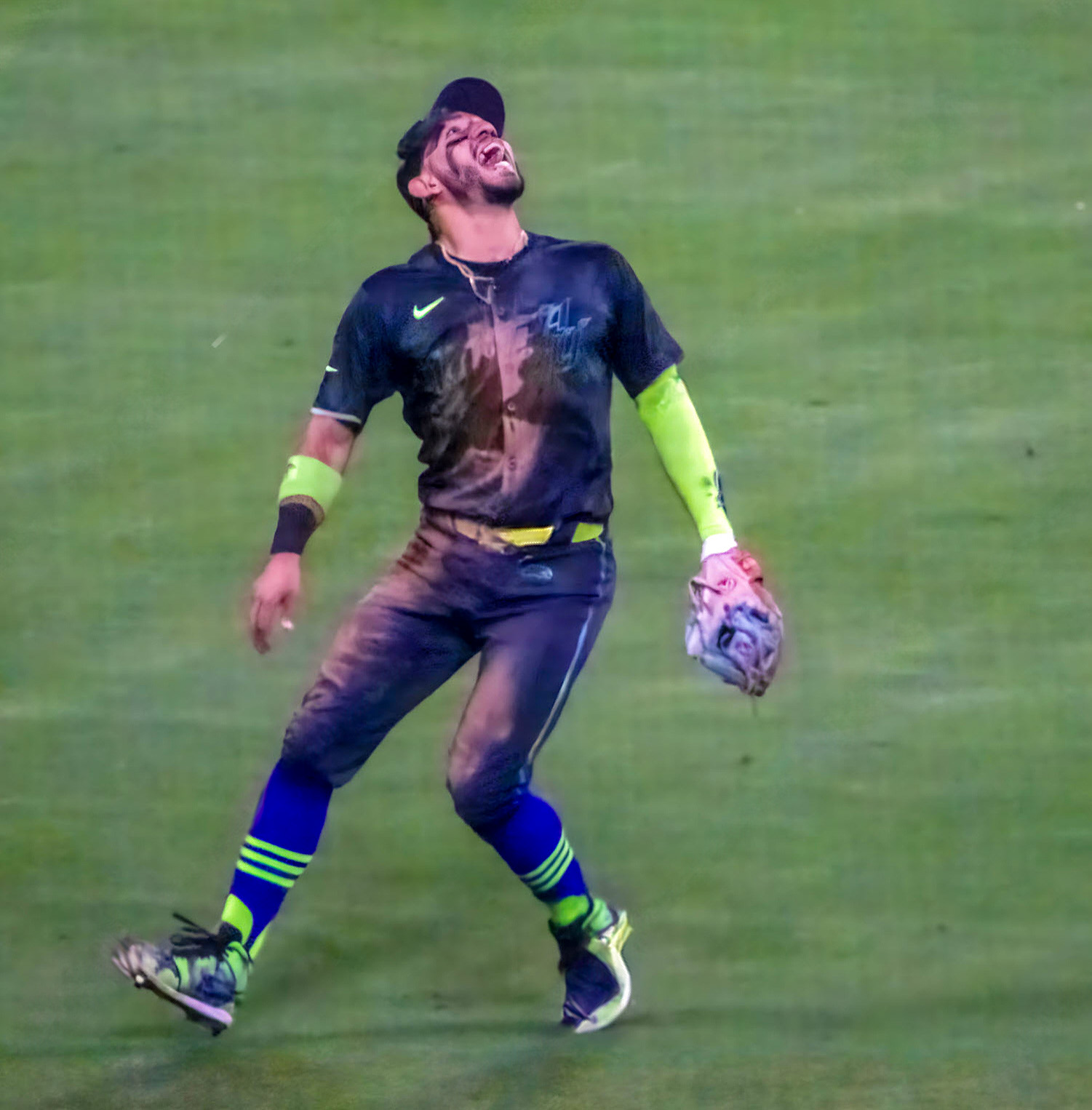
Caballero goes for a pop-up in 2024

On January 5, 2024, the Mariners traded Caballero to the Tampa Bay Rays in exchange for Luke Raley. He made 139 appearances for the Rays during the regular season, batting .227/.283/.347 with nine home runs, 44 RBI, and an AL-leading 44 stolen bases.

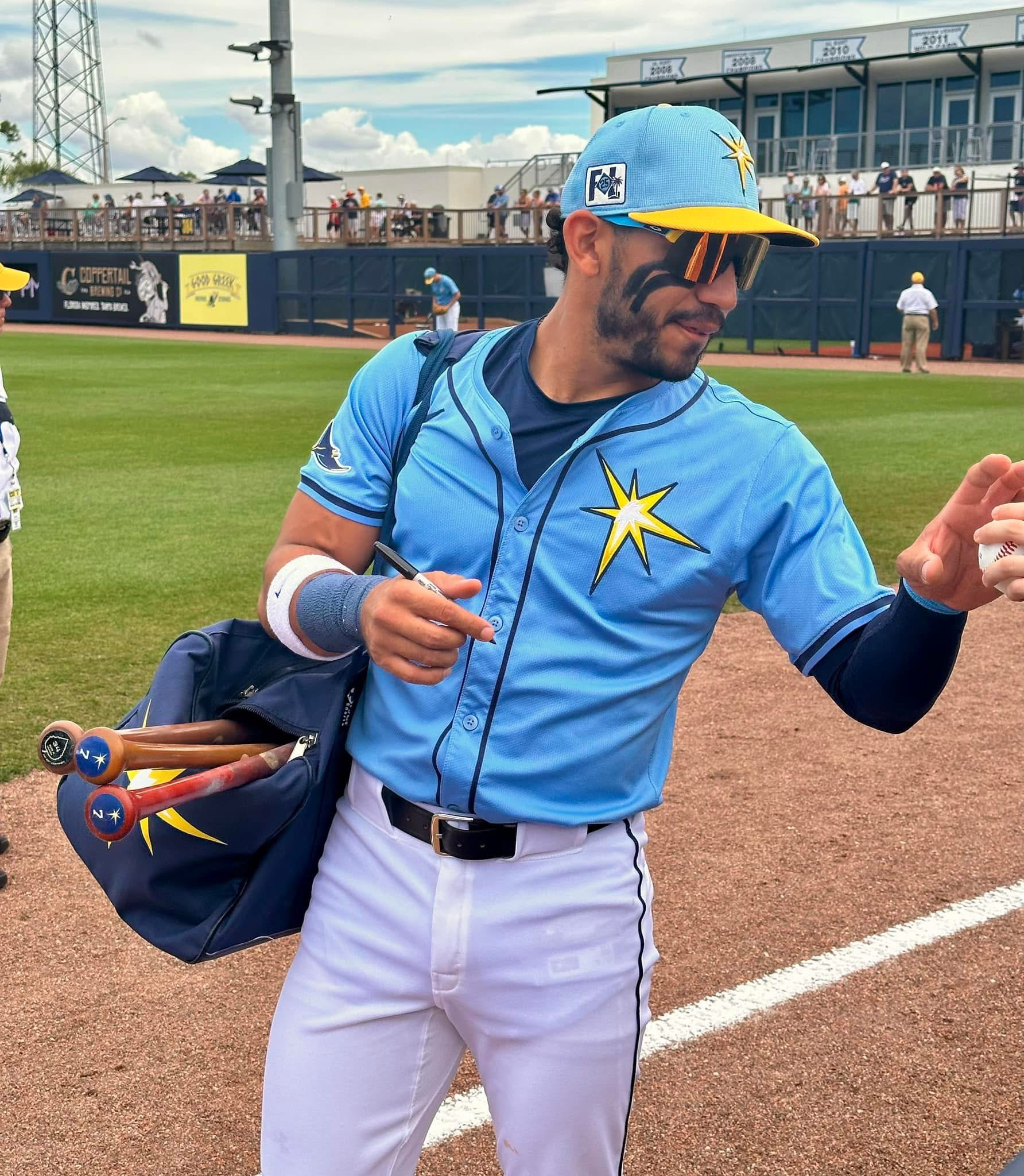
Caballero with the Rays in 2025

Caballero made 86 appearances for Tampa Bay in 2025, slashing .226/.327/.311 with two home runs, 27 RBI, and 34 stolen bases.

=== New York Yankees ===
On July 31, 2025, the Rays traded Caballero to the New York Yankees in exchange for Everson Pereira and Marshall Toole. Caballero led MLB with 49 stolen bases for the 2025 season.

On Opening Day of the 2026 MLB season, Caballero made the first Automated Ball-Strike System challenge in an MLB regular season game, challenging Bill Miller's strike call on Logan Webb's first pitch to him in the fourth inning. The challenge was unsuccessful, and the strike call was upheld. The helmet that Caballero tapped to initiate the challenge was authenticated so that it could be sent to the National Baseball Hall of Fame and Museum.

== International career ==
Caballero was named to the Panamanian national team in the 2023 World Baseball Classic. In the tournament, he slashed .231/.333/.308 with three hits and one walk over 15 plate appearances.

== See also ==
- List of Major League Baseball annual stolen base leaders
