= Jorge García (baseball) =

Panamanian baseball player (born 2002)

Caliente de Durango
- Pitcher
- Born: May 10, 2002 (age 24); San Miguelito, Panama
- Bats: Right Throws: Right

Jorge Manuel García (born May 10, 2002) is a Panamanian professional baseball pitcher for the Caliente de Durango of the Mexican Baseball League.

== Early life ==
García was born in San Miguelito, Panama.

== Professional career ==
=== San Francisco Giants ===
García signed as an international free agent with the San Francisco Giants on July 12, 2018. He was assigned to the Dominican Summer League for his professional debut in 2019. For the 2021 season, García was promoted to the A-level San Jose Giants. His contract was not renewed after the 2023 season.

=== Panamá Metro ===
In 2025, García played for Panamá Metro of the Campeonato Nacional de Béisbol Mayor. In 17 games, he pitched 41 innnings with a 4-0 record with a 0.27 ERA and 37 strikeouts. He was named the pitcher of the year after the season.

=== Caliente de Durango ===
On June 3, 2025, García signed with the Caliente de Durango of the Mexican Baseball League. Garcia made 10 starts in 2025, with a 3-4 record and a 5.70 ERA.

== International career ==
García was named to the Panama national baseball team for the 2026 World Baseball Classic.
