= Jan Granado =

Venezuelan baseball player

- Pitcher
- Born: September 26, 1982 (age 43); Caracas, Venezuela
- Bats: Left Throws: Left
- Stats at Baseball Reference

Jan Carlos Granado (born September 26, 1982 in Caracas, Venezuela) is a Venezuelan former professional baseball pitcher.

== Career ==
Granado signed as an undrafted free agent with the Cincinnati Reds in 1999. He was selected by the Minnesota Twins in the minor league section of the 2004 Rule 5 draft.

Granado represented Venezuela national baseball team in the 2009 World Baseball Classic.
