= Owen Caissie =

Canadian baseball player (born 2002)

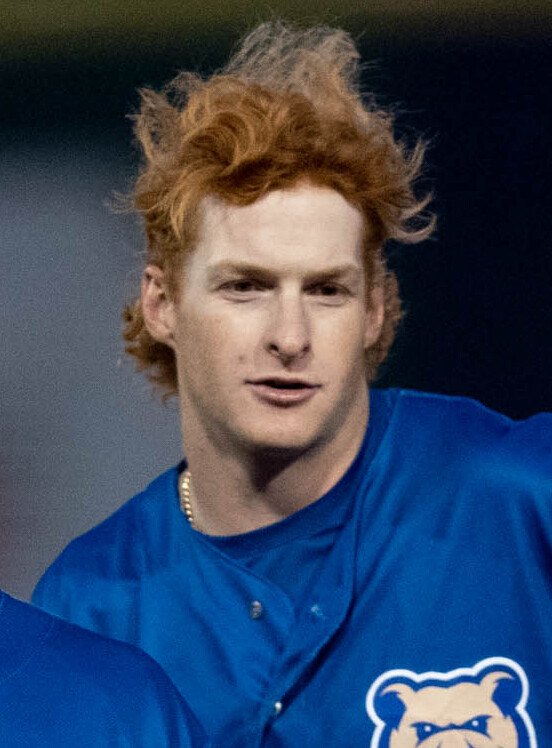
- Caissie with the Iowa Cubs in 2024

Miami Marlins – No. 17
- Outfielder
- Born: July 8, 2002 (age 24); Burlington, Ontario, Canada
- Bats: Left Throws: Right

MLB debut
- August 14, 2025, for the Chicago Cubs

MLB statistics (through 2026 season)
- Batting average: .218
- Home runs: 15
- Runs batted in: 62
- Stats at Baseball Reference

Teams
- Chicago Cubs (2025); Miami Marlins (2026–present)

Owen Andrew Caissie (born July 8, 2002) is a Canadian professional baseball outfielder for the Miami Marlins of Major League Baseball (MLB). He has previously played in MLB for the Chicago Cubs.

== Professional career ==
Caissie grew up in Burlington, Ontario, and attended Notre Dame Catholic Secondary School. Caissie played for Canada's Junior National team.

=== San Diego Padres ===
The San Diego Padres drafted Caissie in the second round, with the 45th overall selection, of the 2020 Major League Baseball draft, the first player from Canada selected in that year’s draft. Caissie was also the highest-selected Canadian outfielder in the MLB draft to date. He signed with the team on June 24, 2020, and received a $1,200,004 signing bonus. Caissie spent the remainder of the summer training in Ontario due to the 2020 minor league season being cancelled because of the COVID-19 pandemic.

=== Chicago Cubs ===
On December 29, 2020, the Padres traded Caissie, pitcher Zach Davies, Reginald Preciado, Yeison Santana, and Ismael Mena to the Chicago Cubs in exchange for pitcher Yu Darvish and catcher Víctor Caratini. He began the 2021 minor league season with the Rookie-level Arizona Complex League Cubs, where he batted .349 with six home runs before being promoted to the Low-A Myrtle Beach Pelicans.

In 2022, Caissie played in 105 games for the High–A South Bend Cubs, hitting .254/.349/.402 with 11 home runs, 58 RBI, and 11 stolen bases. In the 2022 Arizona Fall League he batted .220 with one home run, nine RBI, and three stolen bases. Caissie spent the 2023 campaign with the Double-A Tennessee Smokies, making 120 appearances and batting .289/.399/.519 with 22 home runs and 84 RBI.

Caissie spent the 2024 season with the Triple–A Iowa Cubs, playing in 127 games and slashing .278/.375/.473 with 19 home runs, 75 RBI, and 11 stolen bases. Following the season, the Cubs added Caissie to their 40-man roster to protect him from the Rule 5 draft. Caissie was optioned to Triple-A Iowa to begin the 2025 season.

The Cubs promoted Caissie to the major leagues on August 14, 2025, and he made his major league debut against the Toronto Blue Jays. Playing right field in a crucial game against the division rival Milwaukee Brewers, Caissie had three RBI in a 6-4 victory on August 19, including a solo homer, his first. He played in 12 games for Chicago, batting 5-for-26 (.192) with one home run and four RBI.

=== Miami Marlins ===
On January 7, 2026, the Cubs traded Caissie, Cristian Hernández, and Edgardo De Leon to the Miami Marlins in exchange for Edward Cabrera. On March 29, Caissie hit a walk-off home run against the Colorado Rockies to win the game 4–3 and give the Marlins their first 3–0 start since 2009. He made 108 appearances for Miami, slashing .220/.288/.412 with 14 home runs, 58 RBI, and five stolen bases. On September 13, Caissie was placed on the injured list due to a lumbar stress reaction; manager Clayton McCullough subsequently announced that Caissie's season was "likely done."

== International career ==
Caissie played for the Canada national baseball team at the 2023 World Baseball Classic (WBC) and at the 2026 WBC. He hit a home run in Canada's first game in 2026, batting .412 in five games.
