= Miguel Cienfuegos =

Panamanian-Canadian baseball player (born 1997)

Québec Capitales – No. 0
- Pitcher
- Born: February 10, 1997 (age 29); Laval, Quebec, Canada
- Bats: Left Throws: Left
- Stats at Baseball Reference

Miguel Cienfuegos (born February 10, 1997) is a Panamanian-Canadian professional baseball pitcher for the Québec Capitales of the Frontier League. He was named to the Panama national baseball team for the 2026 World Baseball Classic

== Career ==
=== Québec Capitales ===
Cienfuegos attended Northwest Florida State College as a pitcher and outfielder and graduated in 2018. He did not pitch in 2019 and 2020. For the 2021 season, Cienfuegos signed with the Capitales de Québec of the Frontier League, where he was 9–6 with a 3.78 ERA. In 2022 for the Capitales, Cienfuegos was 10–2 with a 1.79 ERA. The Capitales would win the 2022 Frontier League championship while Cienfuegos would become the 2022 Frontier League pitcher of the year.

=== San Diego Padres ===
Following the 2022 season, Cienfuegos pitched for the Adelaide Giants of the Australian Baseball League. On December 21, 2022, Cienfuegos signed a minor league contract with the San Diego Padres of Major League Baseball. He made 18 appearances (16 starts) for the rookie–level Arizona Complex League Padres, Single–A Lake Elsinore Storm, and High–A Fort Wayne TinCaps, posting a combined 3–7 record and 4.04 ERA with 62 strikeouts over 78 innings of work.

In 2024, Cienfuegos made 27 total appearances (including 19 starts) for High–A Fort Wayne, the Double–A San Antonio Missions, and Triple–A El Paso Chihuahuas, accumulating a 9–8 record and 5.36 ERA with 84 strikeouts. Cienfuegos made 30 appearances (including six starts) for San Antonio and El Paso during the 2025 campaign, logging a cumulative 3–3 record and 4.33 ERA with 57 strikeouts and one save across 68 2/3 innings pitched.

Cienfuegos began the 2026 season with Triple–A El Paso, struggling to a 2–5 record and 7.35 ERA with 44 strikeouts across 31 appearances. He was released by the Padres organization on August 12, 2026.

=== Québec Capitales (second stint) ===
On August 17, 2026, Cienfuegos signed with the Québec Capitales of the Frontier League.
