= Manuel Campos (baseball) =

Panamanian baseball player

Manuel Israel Campos
- Pitcher
- Born: January 12, 1990 (age 36); Chitré, Herrera Province, Panama
- Stats at Baseball Reference

Manuel Israel Campos (born January 12, 1990, in Chitré, Herrera Province, Panama) is a minor league baseball pitcher who also appeared on Panama's roster in the 2009 World Baseball Classic.

== Minor league baseball career ==
At 17 years old, Campos was signed by the Seattle Mariners. He has pitched for the VSL Mariners since 2007, going 1–0 with a 5.75 ERA in 11 games in 2007, and 3–3 with a 3.90 ERA in 19 games in 2008. He began 2009 with them as well.

== 2009 World Baseball Classic ==
Campos appeared on Panama's roster, but did not actually play.

== 2017 Bolivarian Games ==
In 2017, Campos was part of Panama's roster during Bolivarian Games. He relieved Davis Romero in the opener against Peru and struck out four of seven batters he faced, walking one and not allowing a run to close out a shutout win. Panama would get the Silver Medal.

== 2021 Caribbean Series ==
Campos appeared was part of the roster of Federales de Chiriquí during 2021 Caribbean Series, as Runners-up of the 2019–20 Panamanian Professional Baseball League.
