= Austin Bergner =

American baseball player (born 1997)

Free agent
- Pitcher
- Born: May 1, 1997 (age 29); Boca Raton, Florida, U.S.
- Bats: Right Throws: Right
- Stats at Baseball Reference
Medals
Men's baseball
Representing United States
U-18 Baseball World Cup
Gold medal – first place	2015 Osaka	Team

Austin Stone Bergner (born May 1, 1997) is an American professional baseball pitcher who is a free agent. He played college baseball for the North Carolina Tar Heels.

== Amateur career ==
Bergner initially attended West Orange High School in Winter Garden, Florida, where he started receiving national attention as a sophomore. He transferred to Windermere Prep in 2015, the summer before his junior year. That season, he had a 6–1 win–loss record and 0.40 earned run average (ERA) in 52.2 innings pitched. Sports Illustrated named him the #3 high school pitcher in the nation from the class of 2016, and USA Today selected him as the #14 most promising prospect in his class. After his senior year, he was drafted by the Boston Red Sox in the 38th round of the 2016 MLB draft, but he did not sign, and instead chose to attend the University of North Carolina to play college baseball. In 2017 and 2018, he played collegiate summer baseball with the Chatham Anglers of the Cape Cod Baseball League.

Bergner throws a fastball between 90–93 miles per hour (144–149 km/h), a curveball and a changeup.

== Professional career ==
=== Detroit Tigers ===
Bergner was drafted by the Detroit Tigers in the 9th round, with the 262nd overall selection, of the 2019 Major League Baseball draft. He split his first professional season between the rookie-level Gulf Coast League Tigers and Low-A Connecticut Tigers, accumulating an 0-3 record and 6.33 ERA with 18 strikeouts over 27 innings of work. Bergner did not play in a game in 2020 due to the cancellation of the minor league season because of the COVID-19 pandemic.

Bergner returned to action in 2021 with the Single-A Lakeland Flying Tigers and High-A West Michigan Whitecaps. In 27 appearances (10 starts) split between the two affiliates, he posted a cumulative 6-2 record and 3.35 ERA with 110 strikeouts across 83 1/3 innings pitched. Bergner split the 2022 season between the Double-A Erie SeaWolves and Triple-A Toledo Mud Hens. In 27 appearances (26 starts) for the two affiliates, he compiled an aggregate 5-5 record and 3.47 ERA with 121 strikeouts across 119 1/3 innings pitched.

Bergner returned to Erie and Toledo for the 2023 season, registering a 7-5 record and 5.62 ERA with 94 strikeouts and two saves across 73 2/3 innings pitched. Bergner split 2024 between Toledo, Erie, and West Michigan. He made 23 appearances (22 starts) for the three affiliates, logging a cumulative 3-4 record and 4.72 ERA with 108 strikeouts across 89 2/3 innings pitched.

Bergner made 27 appearances (15 starts) for Erie and Toledo in 2025, logging a combined 9-7 record and 3.43 ERA with 95 strikeouts over 97 innings of work. He elected free agency following the season on November 6, 2025.

=== Texas Rangers ===
On January 28, 2026, Bergner signed with the Olmecas de Tabasco of the Mexican League. However, on February 3, Bergner signed a minor league contract with the Texas Rangers organization. He made nine appearances (including five starts) split between the Double-A Frisco RoughRiders and Triple-A Round Rock Express, posting a cumulative 2-3 record and 5.85 ERA with 17 strikeouts over 20 innings of work. Bergner was released by the Rangers organization on June 9.

== International career ==
Bergner represented the United States U18 team that won a gold medal at the 2014 COPABE Pan American Championships in Mexico. In a game against Cuba, he was brought in to close out the game in the ninth inning, earning the save in a 5–4 win. Bergner subsequently represented Team USA at the 2015 WBSC U-18 Baseball World Cup in Japan, where they also won gold. In their opening game against the Czech Republic, he struck out nine batters in six innings to lead USA to an 11–1 mercy rule win.

Bergner was selected to play for the Colombia national baseball team at the 2026 World Baseball Classic.
