= Duane Underwood Jr. =

American baseball player (born 1994)

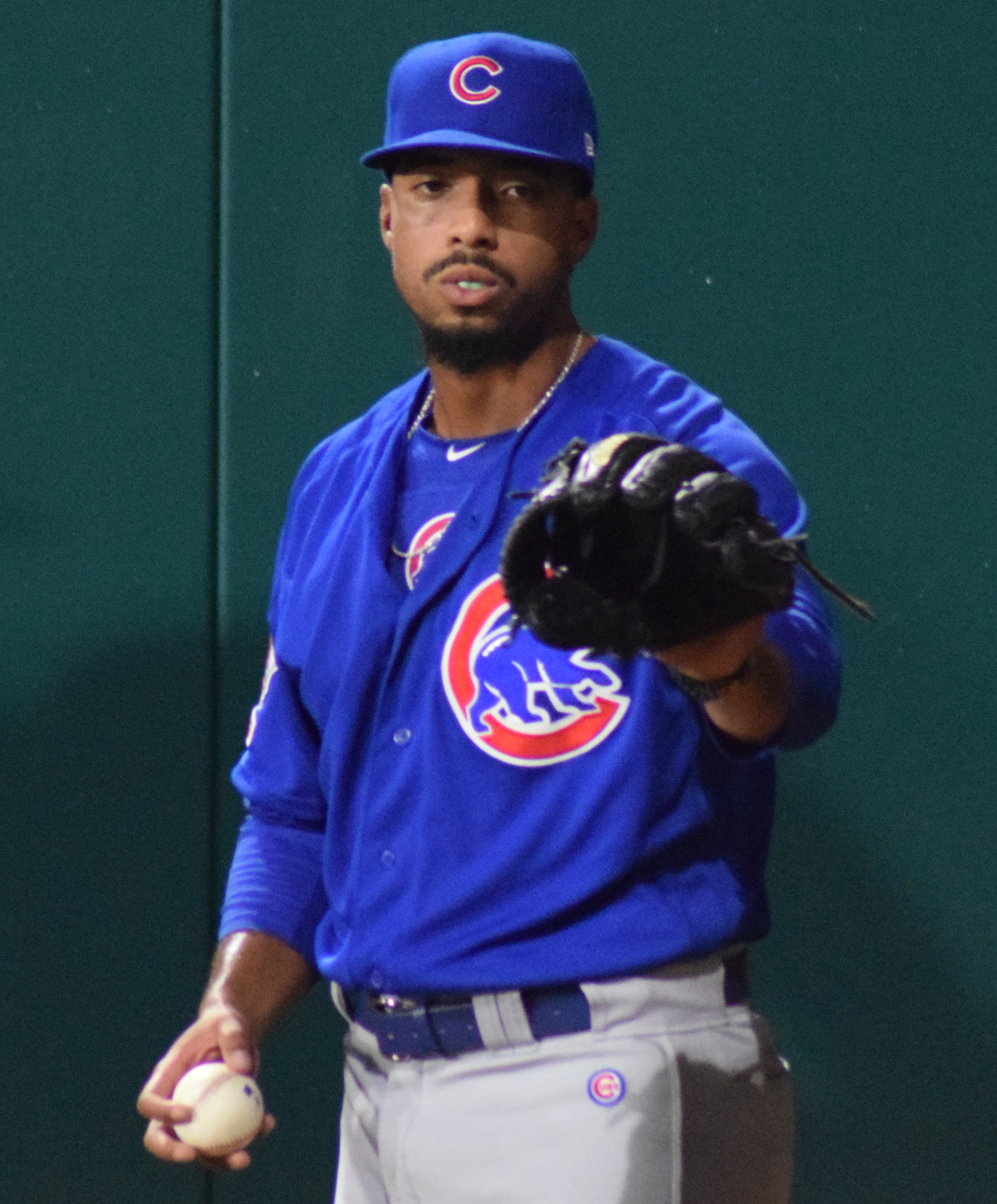
- Underwood with the Chicago Cubs in 2019

Free agent
- Pitcher
- Born: July 20, 1994 (age 32); Raleigh, North Carolina, U.S.
- Bats: Right Throws: Right

MLB debut
- June 25, 2018, for the Chicago Cubs

MLB statistics (through 2023 season)
- Win–loss record: 5–10
- Earned run average: 4.63
- Strikeouts: 179
- Stats at Baseball Reference

Teams
- Chicago Cubs (2018–2020); Pittsburgh Pirates (2021–2023)

Duane Lee Underwood Jr. (born July 20, 1994) is an American professional baseball pitcher who is a free agent. He has previously played in Major League Baseball (MLB) for the Chicago Cubs and Pittsburgh Pirates. He plays for the Puerto Rico national baseball team.

== Career ==
=== Amateur career ===
Underwood attended Alan C. Pope High School in Marietta, Georgia. He committed to play college baseball for the Georgia Bulldogs.

=== Chicago Cubs ===
The Chicago Cubs selected Underwood in the second round of the 2012 MLB draft. He signed with the Cubs, making his professional debut that same year with the Arizona League Cubs. He spent 2013 with the Boise Hawks and 2014 with the Kane County Cougars. For 2015, Underwood was promoted to the Myrtle Beach Pelicans, where he posted a 2.58 earned run average (ERA) in 73 1/3 innings pitched. Underwood spent 2016 with the Tennessee Smokies, South Bend Cubs, and Myrtle Beach Pelicans, where he posted an 0–6 record with a 4.32 ERA. After the season, Underwood played for the Mesa Solar Sox of the Arizona Fall League and was added to the Cubs 40-man roster. He spent 2017 with the Tennessee Smokies where he went 13–7 with a 4.43 ERA and a 1.30 WHIP in 25 games.

Underwood started the 2018 season with the Iowa Cubs. On June 25, 2018, the Cubs promoted Underwood to the major leagues to make his first start against the Los Angeles Dodgers. He was optioned back to Iowa after the game, and spent the remainder of the year in Iowa. He returned to Iowa to begin 2019. He returned to the Chicago Cubs on August 6, 2019, and struck out all six batters he faced in his first appearance. Underwood appeared in 17 games for the Cubs in 2020 and pitched to a 5.66 ERA with 27 strikeouts in 20 2/3 innings pitched.

On March 2, 2021, Underwood was designated for assignment after the signing of Ryan Tepera was made official.

=== Pittsburgh Pirates ===
On March 7, 2021, the Cubs traded Underwood to the Pittsburgh Pirates in exchange for Shendrik Apostel. In 43 games for the Pirates, he registered a 4.33 ERA with 65 strikeouts and 72 2/3 innings pitched. On September 6, Underwood was placed on the 60-day injured list with right shoulder inflammation. In 2022, Underwood made 51 appearances out of the Pirates' bullpen, recording a 4.40 ERA with 57 strikeouts in 57 1/3 innings pitched.

On January 13, 2023, Underwood agreed to a one-year, $1.025 million contract with the Pirates, avoiding salary arbitration. He pitched in 20 games for Pittsburgh, recording a 5.18 ERA with 14 strikeouts and two saves in 24 1/3 innings of work. Underwood was designated for assignment on May 27. He cleared waivers and accepted an outright assignment to the Triple-A Indianapolis Indians on June 2. On October 2, Underwood elected free agency.

=== New York Yankees ===
On December 14, 2023, Underwood signed a minor league contract with the New York Yankees. In 32 appearances for the Triple–A Scranton/Wilkes-Barre RailRiders, he compiled a 3.26 ERA with 40 strikeouts and 3 saves over 38 2/3 innings pitched. Underwood was released by the Yankees organization on August 5, 2024.

=== Gastonia Ghost Peppers ===
On April 18, 2025, Underwood signed with the Gastonia Ghost Peppers of the Atlantic League of Professional Baseball. He made 32 appearances (eight starts) for Gastonia, logging a 5-2 record and 3.97 ERA with 58 strikeouts over 68 innings of work.

=== Leones de Yucatán ===
On December 12, 2025, Underwood signed with the Leones de Yucatán of the Mexican League. In three appearances (two starts) for the Leones, he registered a 6.75 ERA, striking out two and walking five batters across 6 2/3 innings of work. On May 11, 2026, Underwood was released by Yucatán.

=== Gastonia Ghost Peppers (second stint) ===
On June 4, 2026, Underwood signed with the Gastonia Ghost Peppers of the Atlantic League of Professional Baseball. In five starts for the team, he posted a 0–1 record with a 7.82 ERA, 10 strikeouts, and five walks across 12 2/3 innings pitched. On July 1, Underwood was released by Gastonia.

== International career ==
Underwood is of Puerto Rican descent through his maternal grandmother. During the 2023 World Baseball Classic (WBC), he pitched for the Puerto Rico national team. On March 13, 2023, he pitched in relief versus Israel and retired every batter faced in the eighth inning, after José De León started and Yacksel Ríos, Edwin Díaz kept the perfect game intact, and Martín Maldonado caught on the way to a 10–0 win. The contest ended when Maldonado scored on a walk-off hit in the bottom of the eighth inning that invoked the tournament's mercy rule. However, it did not qualify as an official perfect game per the Elias Sports Bureau, due to lasting fewer than nine innings.
