= 2023 World Baseball Classic Pool A =

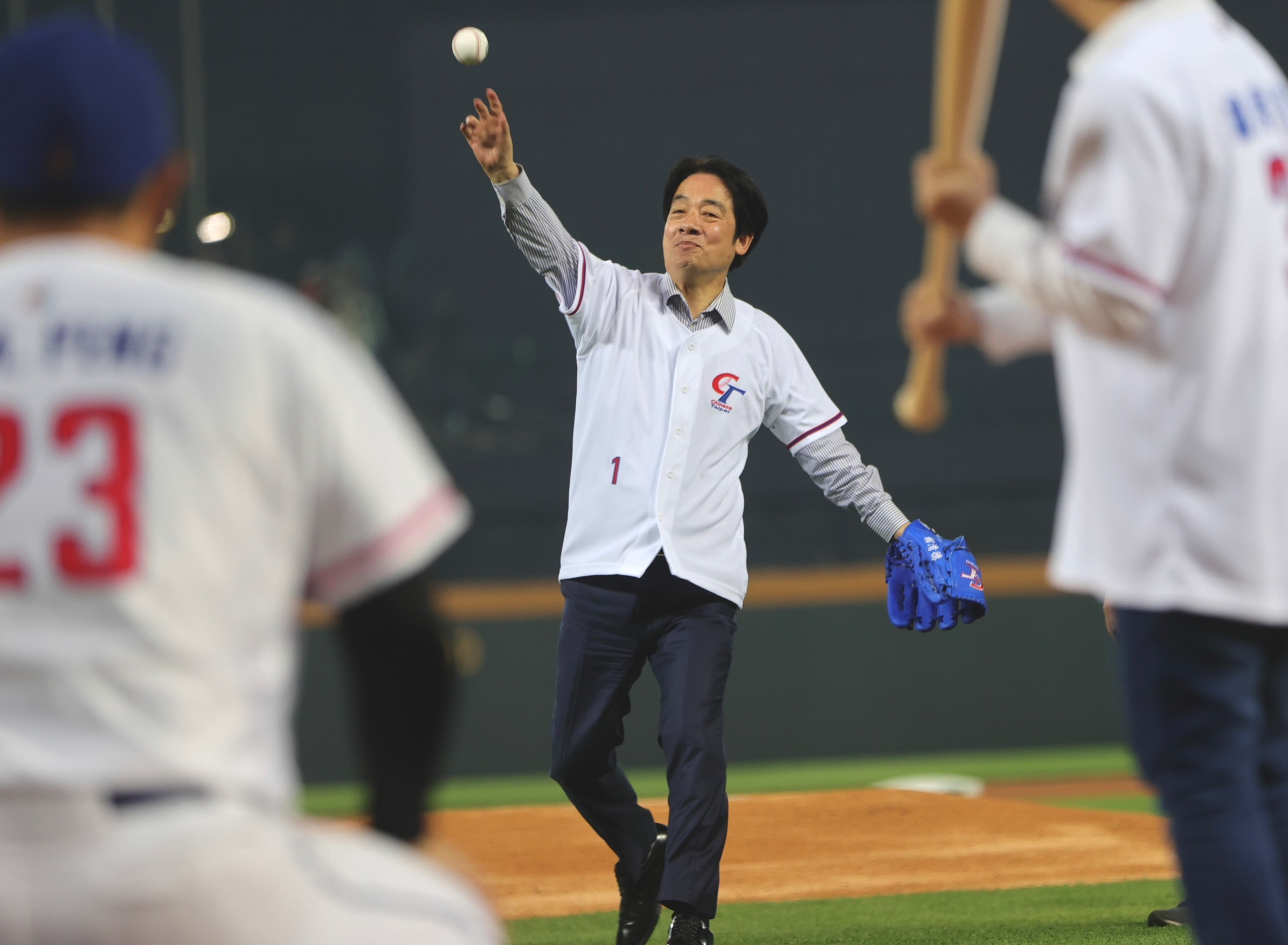
- William Lai throwing the ceremonial first pitch on March 8

Tournament details
- Country: Taiwan
- City: Taichung
- Venue: Taichung Intercontinental Baseball Stadium
- Dates: March 8–12
- Teams: 5

Final positions
- Champions: Cuba
- Runners-up: Italy

Awards
- MVP: (Chinese Taipei) Yu Chang

The 2023 World Baseball Classic Pool A was the first of four pools of the 2023 World Baseball Classic that took place from March 8–12 at Taichung Stadium in Taichung, Taiwan. The top two teams automatically qualified for the top eight knockout stage, beginning with the quarterfinals in Tokyo and the remaining of the bracket in Miami. The teams in this pool consisted of hosts Chinese Taipei, Cuba, Italy, Netherlands, and Panama.

After all games were completed, the five teams tied at 2–2. This resulted in the standings being determined by the fewest runs allowed per defensive out recorded. Cuba won the pool and advanced to the quarterfinals, along with Italy as runners-up, and Chinese Taipei fell to last place and was relegated to the qualifiers for the 2026 World Baseball Classic, despite scoring the most in the pool.

Yu Chang of Chinese Taipei was named the most valuable player of Pool A.

== Teams ==
Draw position	Team	Pot	Confederation	Method of qualification	Date of qualification	Finals appearance	Last appearance	Previous best performance	WBSC Rankings
A1	Chinese Taipei	1	WBSC Asia	Hosts + 2017 participants	March 6, 2017	5th	2017	Quarterfinals (2013)	2
A2	Netherlands	2	WBSC Europe	2017 participants	March 6, 2017	5th	2017	Fourth place (2013, 2017)	7
A3	Cuba	3	WBSC Americas	2017 participants	March 6, 2017	5th	2017	Runners-up (2006)	8
A4	Italy	4	WBSC Europe	2017 participants	March 6, 2017	5th	2017	Quarterfinals (2013)	16
A5	Panama	5	WBSC Americas	Qualifiers Pool B winners	October 4, 2022	3rd	2009	Pool stage (2006, 2009)	12

== Standings ==
Pos	Team	Pld	W	L	RF	RA	PCT	GB	Qualification
1	Cuba	4	2	2	25	15	.500 (Note: Runs allowed per defensive out recorded: Cuba .139, Italy .157, Netherlands .186, Panama .200, Chinese Taipei .295)	—	Advance to quarterfinals Qualification for 2026 World Baseball Classic
2	Italy	4	2	2	20	17	.500	—	Advance to quarterfinals Qualification for 2026 World Baseball Classic
3	Netherlands	4	2	2	13	19	.500	—	Qualification for 2026 World Baseball Classic
4	Panama	4	2	2	19	21	.500	—	Qualification for 2026 World Baseball Classic
5	Chinese Taipei (H)	4	2	2	26	31	.500	—	

Source: MLB
Rules for classification: Tiebreakers
(H) Hosts

=== Tiebreaker ===
As all five teams tied at 2–2, WBC's tiebreakers went into effect. The first tiebreaker, head-to-head record, was unnecessary because all five teams were tied. The final standings were determined by the fewest runs allowed per defensive out recorded. Based on the calculation, Cuba won the pool, while Italy advanced as the runner-up.

Pool A Tiebreaker
1. Cuba – 15 runs allowed / 108 outs recorded = .139 runs/out
2. Italy – 17 runs allowed / 108 outs recorded = .157 runs/out
3. Netherlands – 19 runs allowed / 102 outs recorded = .186 runs/out
4. Panama – 21 runs allowed / 105 outs recorded = .200 runs/out
5. Chinese Taipei – 31 runs allowed / 105 outs recorded = .295 runs/out

== Summary ==
Date	Local time	Road team	Score	Home team	Inn.	Venue	Game duration	Attendance	Boxscore
Mar 8, 2023	12:00 NST	Cuba	2–4	Netherlands		Taichung Stadium	3:07	6,501	Boxscore
Mar 8, 2023	19:00 NST	Panama	12–5	Chinese Taipei		Taichung Stadium	4:02	15,540	Boxscore
Mar 9, 2023	12:00 NST	Panama	1–3	Netherlands		Taichung Stadium	2:45	6,048	Boxscore
Mar 9, 2023	19:00 NST	Italy	6–3	Cuba	10	Taichung Stadium	3:43	6,217	Boxscore
Mar 10, 2023	12:30 NST	Cuba	13–4	Panama		Taichung Stadium	4:09	7,023	Boxscore
Mar 10, 2023	19:00 NST	Italy	7–11	Chinese Taipei		Taichung Stadium	3:58	18,799	Boxscore
Mar 11, 2023	12:00 NST	Panama	2–0	Italy		Taichung Stadium	2:57	7,732	Boxscore
Mar 11, 2023	19:00 NST	Netherlands	5–9	Chinese Taipei		Taichung Stadium	3:34	18,826	Boxscore
Mar 12, 2023	12:00 NST	Chinese Taipei	1–7	Cuba		Taichung Stadium	3:21	18,852	Boxscore
Mar 12, 2023	19:00 NST	Netherlands	1–7	Italy		Taichung Stadium	3:00	4,985	Boxscore

== Games ==
=== Cuba vs Netherlands ===
March 8, 2023 12:00 PM TWT at Taichung Stadium in Taichung, Taiwan 24 °C (75 °F), fair
Team	1	2	3	4	5	6	7	8	9	R	H	E
Cuba	0	1	0	0	0	0	1	0	0	2	3	0
Netherlands	0	0	1	0	0	3	0	0	X	4	7	0
WP: Eric Méndez (1–0) LP: Onelki García (0–1) Sv: Wendell Floranus (1); Attendance: 6,501 (32.5%); Umpires: HP – Nic Lentz, 1B – Shoji Arisumi, 2B – Dan Iassogna, 3B – Serge Makouchetcher; Boxscore

=== Panama vs Chinese Taipei ===
March 8, 2023 19:00 PM TWT at Taichung Stadium in Taichung, Taiwan 18 °C (64 °F), clear
Team	1	2	3	4	5	6	7	8	9	R	H	E
Panama	0	0	0	5	0	6	1	0	0	12	14	0
Chinese Taipei	0	0	0	0	1	1	2	1	0	5	13	1
WP: Randall Delgado (1–0) LP: Chih-Wei Hu (0–1); Home runs: PAN: None; TPE: Nien-Ting Wu (1); Attendance: 15,540 (77.7%); Umpires: HP – Roberto Ortiz, 1B – Trent Thomas, 2B – Chris Segal, 3B – Ki Talk Park; Boxscore

=== Panama vs Netherlands ===
March 9, 2023 12:00 PM TWT at Taichung Stadium in Taichung, Taiwan
Team	1	2	3	4	5	6	7	8	9	R	H	E
Panama	0	0	0	0	0	1	0	0	0	1	7	1
Netherlands	0	0	1	0	1	0	0	1	X	3	8	0
WP: Shairon Martis (1–0) LP: Jaime Barría (0–1) Sv: Wendell Floranus (2); Home runs: PAN: None; NED: Xander Bogaerts (1), Jurickson Profar (1); Attendance: 6,048; Umpires: HP – Larry Vanover, 1B – Roberto Ortiz, 2B – Trent Thomas, 3B – Shōji Arisumi; Boxscore

=== Italy vs Cuba ===
March 9, 2023 19:00 PM TWT at Taichung Stadium in Taichung, Taiwan
Team	1	2	3	4	5	6	7	8	9	10	R	H	E
Italy	0	0	0	0	0	1	1	0	0	4	6	11	1
Cuba	0	0	0	0	0	0	1	1	0	1	3	8	0
WP: Matthew Festa (1–0) LP: Raidel Martínez (0–1); Attendance: 6,217; Umpires: HP: Ki Talk Park, 1B: Mark Carlson, 2B: Chris Segal, 3B: Serge Makouchetev; Notes: Extra inning rule was used in 10th inning. Boxscore

=== Cuba vs Panama ===
March 10, 2023 12:30 PM TWT at Taichung Stadium in Taichung, Taiwan
Team	1	2	3	4	5	6	7	8	9	R	H	E
Cuba	1	1	0	0	0	4	5	2	0	13	21	0
Panama	0	4	0	0	0	0	0	0	0	4	9	0
WP: Miguel Romero (1–0) LP: Matt Hardy (0–1); Home runs: CUB: None; PAN: Rubén Tejada (1); Attendance: 7,023; Umpires: HP – Dan Iassogna, 1B – Serge Makouchetev, 2B – Mark Carlson, 3B – Trent Thomas; Boxscore

=== Italy vs Chinese Taipei ===
March 10, 2023 19:00 PM TWT at Taichung Stadium in Taichung, Taiwan
Team	1	2	3	4	5	6	7	8	9	R	H	E
Italy	0	2	0	4	1	0	0	0	0	7	11	2
Chinese Taipei	1	1	3	0	0	2	1	3	X	11	16	0
WP: Yen-Ching Lu (1–0) LP: Stephen Woods Jr. (0–1) Sv: Chia-Hao Sung (1); Home runs: ITA: None; TPE: Tzu-Wei Lin (1), Yu Chang (1), Kungkuan Giljegiljaw (1); Attendance: 18,799; Umpires: HP – Chris Segal, 1B – Nic Lentz, 2B – Shoji Arisumi, 3B – Ki Talk Park; Boxscore

=== Panama vs Italy ===
March 11, 2023 12:00 PM TWT at Taichung Stadium in Taichung, Taiwan
Team	1	2	3	4	5	6	7	8	9	R	H	E
Panama	0	1	0	0	0	0	1	0	0	2	7	0
Italy	0	0	0	0	0	0	0	0	0	0	5	0
WP: Harold Arauz (1–0) LP: Michele Vassalotti (0–1) Sv: Javy Guerra (1); Home runs: PAN: José Ramos (1); ITA: None; Attendance: 7,732; Umpires: HP – Shoji Arisumi, 1B – Larry Vanover, 2B – Trent Thomas, 3B – Chris Segal; Boxscore

=== Netherlands vs Chinese Taipei ===
March 11, 2023 19:00 PM TWT at Taichung Stadium in Taichung, Taiwan
Team	1	2	3	4	5	6	7	8	9	R	H	E
Netherlands	1	0	1	0	0	0	0	2	1	5	6	0
Chinese Taipei	0	5	2	1	0	0	0	1	x	9	11	1
WP: Tzu-Peng Huang (1–0) LP: Lars Huijer (0–1) Sv: Chia-Hao Sung (2); Home runs: NED: Ray-Patrick Didder (1); TPE: Yu Chang (2); Attendance: 18,826; Umpires: HP – Mark Carlson, 1B – Ki Talk Park, 2B – Dan Iassogna, 3B – Serge Makouchetev; Boxscore

=== Chinese Taipei vs Cuba ===
March 12, 2023 12:00 PM TWT at Taichung Stadium in Taichung, Taiwan
Team	1	2	3	4	5	6	7	8	9	R	H	E
Chinese Taipei	0	0	0	0	0	0	0	0	1	1	4	1
Cuba	4	2	0	1	0	0	0	0	x	7	13	0
WP: Elián Leyva (1–0) LP: Shih-Peng Chen (0–1); Home runs: TPE: None; CUB: Erisbel Arruebarrena (1), Yoán Moncada (1); Attendance: 18,852; Umpires: HP – Nic Lentz, 1B – Ki Talk Park, 2B – Larry Vanover, 3B – Shoji Arisumi; Boxscore

=== Netherlands vs Italy ===
March 12, 2023 19:00 PM TWT at Taichung Stadium in Taichung, Taiwan
Team	1	2	3	4	5	6	7	8	9	R	H	E
Netherlands	0	0	1	0	0	0	0	0	0	1	7	1
Italy	0	0	0	6	0	0	0	1	x	7	12	0
WP: Matt Harvey (1–0) LP: Mike Bolsenbroek (0–1); Home runs: NED: Chadwick Tromp (1); ITA: None; Attendance: 4,985; Umpires: HP – Roberto Ortiz, 1B – Dan Iassogna, 2B – Serge Makouchetev, 3B – Trent Thomas; Boxscore

== Statistics ==
=== Leading hitters ===
==== Power ====
SLG	Team	1B	2B	3B	HR	AB
.504	Chinese Taipei	30	7	2	5	139
.454	Cuba	31	11	1	2	141
.377	Italy	28	9	2	0	138
.370	Panama	28	7	0	2	135
.328	Netherlands	23	1	0	4	125

==== Efficiency ====
OBP	Team	H	BB	HBP	AB	SF
.392	Chinese Taipei	44	14	4	139	1
.390	Cuba	45	15	2	141	1
.372	Panama	37	18	3	135	0
.359	Italy	39	16	1	138	1
.331	Netherlands	28	15	5	125	0

=== Leading pitchers ===
WHIP	Team	BB	H	IP	K
1.14	Cuba	10	31	36	38
1.42	Italy	13	38	36	26
1.53	Netherlands	19	33	34	19
1.77	Panama	15	47	35	24
1.86	Chinese Taipei	21	44	35	29
