= 2023 World Baseball Classic Pool C =

Tournament details
- Country: United States
- City: Phoenix, Arizona
- Venue: Chase Field
- Dates: March 11-15
- Teams: 5

Final positions
- Champions: Mexico
- Runners-up: United States

Awards
- MVP: (Mexico) Randy Arozarena

The 2023 World Baseball Classic Pool C was the third of four pools of the 2023 World Baseball Classic that took place from March 11th-15th at Chase Field in Phoenix, Arizona. The Pool C winner and runner up, Mexico and United States advanced to the Quarterfinals 2 round, as well as the Pool D winner and runner up. The Quarterfinals 2 round will be played March 17–18, 2023 in Miami. The teams in this pool consisted of Canada, Colombia, newcomer Great Britain, Mexico, and hosts and defending champions United States.

After starting with a loss to Colombia, Mexico bounced back with three straight wins over the United States, Great Britain and Canada to advance to the quarterfinals as pool winners. The U.S. and Colombia played the last game of the pool, a Colombia win would force a three-way tie which could also favor Canada depending on tiebreakers. The U.S. won 3–2 to advance. Colombia fell to 1–3, tying with Great Britain, but as they lost the head-to-head game, Colombia was relegated to the 2026 World Baseball Classic qualifiers.

== Teams ==
Draw position	Team	Pot	Confederation	Method of qualification	Date of qualification	Finals appearance	Last appearance	Previous best performance	WBSC Rankings
C1	United States	1	WBSC Americas	Hosts + 2017 participants	March 6, 2017	5th	2017	Champions (2017)	3
C2	Mexico	2	WBSC Americas	2017 participants	March 6, 2017	5th	2017	Quarterfinals (2006, 2009)	5
C3	Colombia	3	WBSC Americas	2017 participants	March 6, 2017	2nd	2017	Pool stage (2017)	11
C4	Canada	4	WBSC Americas	2017 participants	March 6, 2017	5th	2017	Pool stage (2006, 2009, 2013, 2017)	14
C5	Great Britain	5	WBSC Europe	Qualifiers Pool A winners	September 20, 2022	1st	—	—	22

== Standings ==
Pos	Team	Pld	W	L	RF	RA	PCT	GB	Qualification
1	Mexico	4	3	1	27	14	.750 (Note: Mexico defeated USA, 11–5)	—	Advance to quarterfinals Qualification for 2026 World Baseball Classic
2	United States (H)	4	3	1	26	16	.750	—	Advance to quarterfinals Qualification for 2026 World Baseball Classic
3	Canada	4	2	2	27	30	.500	1	Qualification for 2026 World Baseball Classic
4	Great Britain	4	1	3	18	31	.250 (Note: Great Britain defeated Colombia, 7–5)	2	Qualification for 2026 World Baseball Classic
5	Colombia	4	1	3	12	19	.250	2	

Source: MLB
Rules for classification: Tiebreakers
(H) Hosts

== Summary ==
Date	Local time	Road team	Score	Home team	Inn.	Venue	Game duration	Attendance	Boxscore
Mar 11, 2023	12:30 MST	Colombia	5–4	Mexico	10	Chase Field	3:24	28,497	Boxscore
Mar 11, 2023	19:00 MST	Great Britain	2–6	United States		Chase Field	2:54	39,650	Boxscore
Mar 12, 2023	12:00 MST	Great Britain	8–18	Canada	7	Chase Field	3:38	11,555	Boxscore
Mar 12, 2023	19:00 MST	Mexico	11–5	United States		Chase Field	3:41	47,534	Boxscore
Mar 13, 2023	12:00 MST	Colombia	5–7	Great Britain		Chase Field	3:50	10,416	Boxscore
Mar 13, 2023	19:00 MST	Canada	1–12	United States	7	Chase Field	2:20	29,621	Boxscore
Mar 14, 2023	12:00 MST	Canada	5–0	Colombia		Chase Field	2:48	10,571	Boxscore
Mar 14, 2023	19:00 MST	Great Britain	1–2	Mexico		Chase Field	3:05	17,705	Boxscore
Mar 15, 2023	12:00 MST	Mexico	10–3	Canada		Chase Field	3:31	17,245	Boxscore
Mar 15, 2023	19:00 MST	United States	3–2	Colombia		Chase Field	3:02	29,856	Boxscore

== Games ==
=== Colombia vs Mexico ===
March 11, 2023 12:30 PM MST at Chase Field in Phoenix, United States
Team	1	2	3	4	5	6	7	8	9	10	R	H	E
Colombia	0	0	0	0	3	0	1	0	0	1	5	7	1
Mexico	0	0	0	1	2	0	1	0	0	0	4	9	1
WP: Guillermo Zuñiga (1–0) LP: Jesús Cruz (0–1); Home runs: COL: Reynaldo Rodríguez (1); MEX: Randy Arozarena (1); Attendance: 28,497; Umpires: HP: Cory Blaser. 1B: Edwin Louisa. 2B: Doug Eddings. 3B: Jairo Mendoza; Boxscore

=== Great Britain vs United States ===
March 11, 2023 19:00 PM MST at Chase Field in Phoenix, United States
Team	1	2	3	4	5	6	7	8	9	R	H	E
Great Britain	1	0	0	0	0	0	1	0	0	2	8	2
United States	0	0	2	3	0	1	0	0	x	6	9	0
WP: Adam Wainwright (1–0) LP: Vance Worley (0–1); Home runs: GBR: Trayce Thompson (1); USA: Kyle Schwarber (1); Attendance: 39,650; Umpires: HP – Carlos Torres, 1B – Felix Tejada, 2B – Bill Miller, 3B – Jhonatan Biarreta; Boxscore

=== Great Britain vs Canada ===
March 12, 2023 12:00 PM MST at Chase Field in Phoenix, United States
Team	1	2	3	4	5	6	7	8	9	R	H	E
Great Britain	3	1	1	3	0	0	0	x	x	8	8	2
Canada	5	1	4	6	1	1	x	x	x	18	17	0
WP: Phillippe Aumont (1–0) LP: Akeel Morris (0–1); Home runs: GBR: Harry Ford (1); CAN: Edouard Julien (1), Owen Caissie (1); Attendance: 11,555; Umpires: HP – Felix Tejada, 1B – Bill Miller, 2B – Jhonatan Biarreta, 3B – Carlos Torres; Boxscore

=== Mexico vs United States ===
March 12, 2023 19:00 PM MST at Chase Field in Phoenix, United States
Team	1	2	3	4	5	6	7	8	9	R	H	E
Mexico	2	0	1	4	0	0	0	4	0	11	15	0
United States	0	1	0	0	0	0	1	3	0	5	8	0
WP: Patrick Sandoval (1–0) LP: Nick Martinez (0–1); Home runs: MEX: Joey Meneses 2 (2); USA: Will Smith (1); Attendance: 47,534; Umpires: HP – Alan Porter, 1B – Jairo Mendoza, 2B – Edwin Louisa, 3B – Cory Blaser; Boxscore

=== Colombia vs Great Britain ===
March 13, 2023 12:00 PM MST at Chase Field in Phoenix, United States
Team	1	2	3	4	5	6	7	8	9	R	H	E
Colombia	0	1	0	2	0	0	0	0	2	5	7	2
Great Britain	0	0	0	3	2	0	2	0	X	7	7	2
WP: Graham Spraker (1–0) LP: Yapson Gomez (0–1) Sv: Ian Gibaut (1); Home runs: COL: Dilson Herrera (1); GBR: Harry Ford (2); Attendance: 10,416; Umpires: HP – Jhonatan Biarreta, 1B – Cory Blaser, 2B – Felix Tejada, 3B – Doug Eddings; Boxscore

=== Canada vs United States ===
March 13, 2023 19:00 PM MST at Chase Field in Phoenix, United States
Team	1	2	3	4	5	6	7	8	9	R	H	E
Canada	0	1	0	0	0	0	0	X	X	1	5	0
United States	9	3	0	0	0	0	X	X	X	12	10	0
WP: Lance Lynn (1–0) LP: Mitch Bratt (0–1); Home runs: CAN: Jared Young (1); USA: Mike Trout (1), Trea Turner (1); Attendance: 29,621; Umpires: HP – Bill Miller, 1B – Edwin Louisa, 2B – Alan Porter 3B – Jairo Mendoza; Boxscore

=== Canada vs Colombia ===
March 14, 2023 12:00 PM MST at Chase Field in Phoenix, United States
Team	1	2	3	4	5	6	7	8	9	R	H	E
Canada	0	0	0	1	0	0	0	1	3	5	10	0
Colombia	0	0	0	0	0	0	0	0	0	0	5	0
WP: Noah Skirrow (1–0) LP: Adrian Almeida (0–1); Home runs: CAN: Otto Lopez (1); COL: None; Attendance: 10,571; Umpires: HP – Doug Eddings, 1B – Alan Porter 2B – Jairo Mendoza, 3B – Edwin Louisa; Boxscore

=== Great Britain vs Mexico ===
March 14, 2023 19:00 PM MST at Chase Field in Phoenix, United States
Team	1	2	3	4	5	6	7	8	9	R	H	E
Great Britain	0	0	0	0	0	1	0	0	0	1	4	1
Mexico	0	1	0	0	0	0	1	0	X	2	7	0
WP: JoJo Romero (1–0) LP: Tahnaj Thomas (0–1) Sv: Giovanny Gallegos (1); Attendance: 17,705; Umpires: HP – Cory Blaser, 1B – Carlos Torres, 2B – Félix Tejada, 3B – Jhonatan Biarreta; Boxscore

=== Mexico vs Canada ===
March 15, 2023 12:00 PM MST at Chase Field in Phoenix, United States
Team	1	2	3	4	5	6	7	8	9	R	H	E
Mexico	2	1	0	0	0	4	2	1	0	10	10	0
Canada	1	0	0	1	0	0	1	0	0	3	7	0
WP: José Urquidy (1–0) LP: Rob Zastryzny (0–1); Home runs: MEX: Rowdy Tellez (1); CAN: Bo Naylor (1), Edouard Julien (2); Attendance: 17,245; Umpires: HP – Carlos Torres, 1B – Doug Eddings, 2B – Jhonathan Biarreta, 3B – Edwin Louisa; Boxscore

=== United States vs Colombia ===
March 15, 2023 19:00 PM MST at Chase Field in Phoenix, United States
Team	1	2	3	4	5	6	7	8	9	R	H	E
United States	0	0	1	0	2	0	0	0	0	3	7	0
Colombia	0	0	2	0	0	0	0	0	0	2	6	0
WP: Kendall Graveman (1–0) LP: Ruben Galindo (0–1) Sv: Ryan Pressly (1); Attendance: 29,856; Umpires: HP – Alan Porter, 1B – Bill Miller, 2B – Jairo Mendoza, 3B – Roberto Peralta; Boxscore

== Statistics ==
=== Leading hitters ===
==== Power ====
SLG	Team	1B	2B	3B	HR	AB
.500	Canada	26	6	1	6	130
.480	United States	19	7	4	4	127
.414	Mexico	30	7	0	4	145
.398	Great Britain	14	9	1	3	118
.277	Colombia	18	5	0	2	130

==== Efficiency ====
OBP	Team	H	BB	HBP	AB	SF
.417	Canada	39	24	2	130	0
.379	Mexico	41	19	4	145	1
.367	United States	34	19	2	127	2
.352	Great Britain	27	21	2	118	1
.248	Colombia	25	10	0	130	1

=== Leading pitchers ===
WHIP	Team	BB	H	IP	K
1.03	Mexico	12	26	37	40
1.24	United States	8	34	34	37
1.42	Colombia	18	33	36	37
1.84	Canada	24	33	31	35
2.29	Great Britain	31	40	31	22
