= Yu Chang =

Taiwanese baseball player (born 1995)

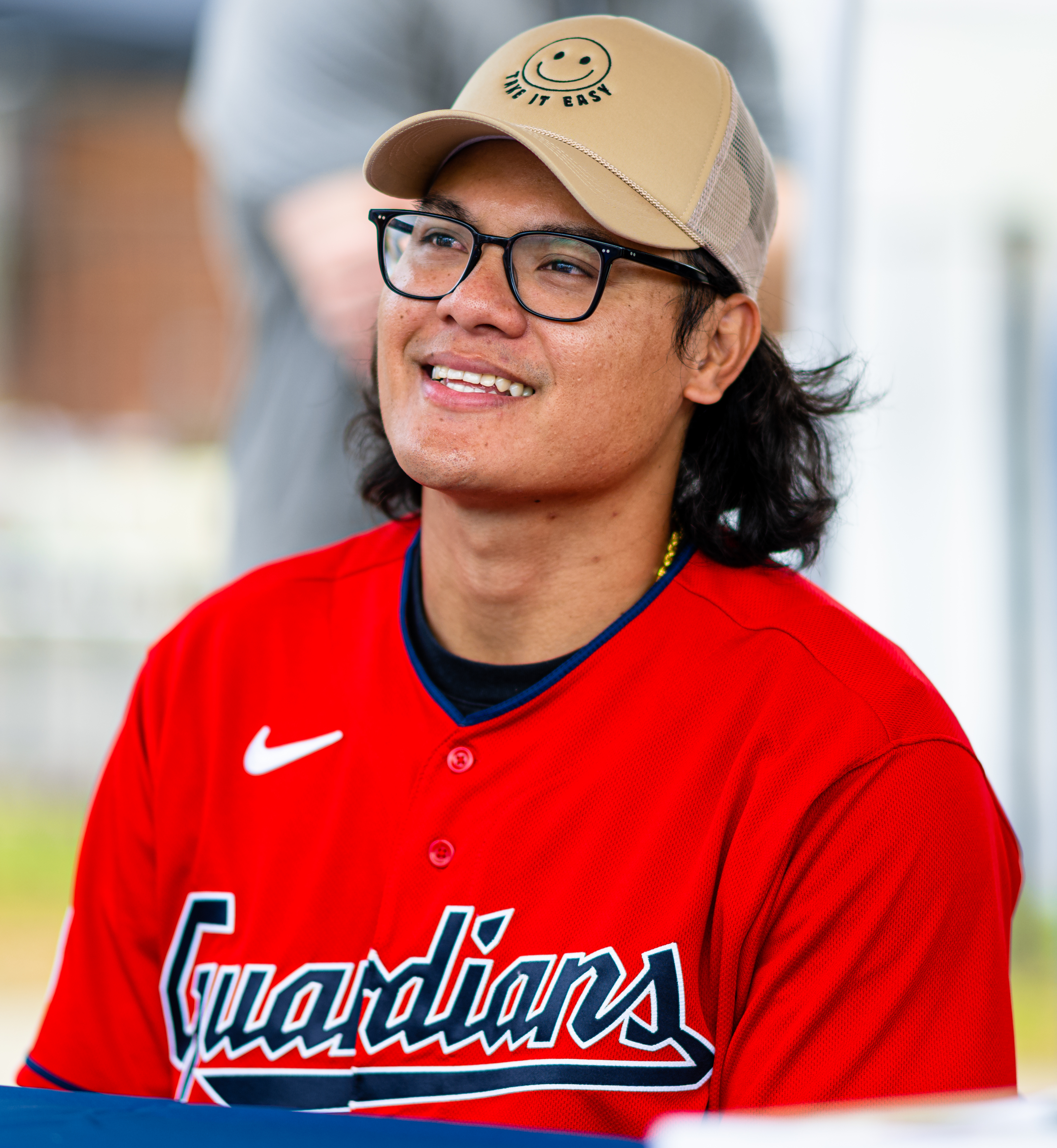
- Chang with the Cleveland Guardians in 2022

Fubon Guardians – No. 99
- Infielder
- Born: August 18, 1995 (age 30); Taitung, Taiwan
- Bats: Right Throws: Right

Professional debut
- MLB: June 28, 2019, for the Cleveland Indians
- CPBL: July 12, 2024, for the Fubon Guardians

MLB statistics (through 2023 season)
- Batting average: .204
- Home runs: 20
- Runs batted in: 79

CPBL statistics (through 2025 season)
- Batting average: .284
- Home runs: 24
- Runs batted in: 65
- Stats at Baseball Reference

Teams
- Cleveland Indians / Guardians (2019–2022); Pittsburgh Pirates (2022); Tampa Bay Rays (2022); Boston Red Sox (2022–2023); Fubon Guardians (2024–present)

Career highlights and awards
- All-WBC Team (2023)

Yu-Cheng Chang (Chinese: 張育成; pinyin: Zhāng Yùchéng; (Note: In this Chinese name, the family name is Zhāng.) born August 18, 1995) is a Taiwanese professional baseball infielder for the Fubon Guardians of the Chinese Professional Baseball League (CPBL). He has previously played in Major League Baseball (MLB) for the Cleveland Indians / Guardians, Pittsburgh Pirates, Tampa Bay Rays, and Boston Red Sox. Chang made his MLB debut in 2019. He represented the Chinese Taipei national baseball team (Taiwan) in the 2023 World Baseball Classic.

Chang's 235 career games played is the most by a Taiwanese player.

== Early life and education ==
Chang was born in Donghe, Taitung County, and attended Taiyuan Elementary School and Taiyuan Junior High School. He played baseball at the Taichung Senior Agricultural and Vocational High School and was a senior student when he signed with the Cleveland Indians.

== Professional career ==
=== Cleveland Indians / Guardians (2013–2022) ===
==== Minor leagues (2013–2019) ====
Chang signed with the Cleveland Indians in 2013 as an international free agent for a $500,000 signing bonus. He made his professional debut in 2014 with the Arizona League Indians of the Rookie-level Arizona League, where he batted .346 with six home runs, 25 runs batted in (RBIs), and a .986 on-base plus slugging (OPS) in 42 games played. He spent the 2015 season with the Lake County Captains of the Single–A Midwest League, where he posted a .232 average with nine home runs and 52 RBIs in 105 games. In 2016, while playing for the Lynchburg Hillcats of the High–A Carolina League, Chang was named an all-star. He was reported to be involved in a trade to the Milwaukee Brewers for Jonathan Lucroy during the 2016 season; however, the trade fell apart after Lucroy would not waive his no-trade clause.

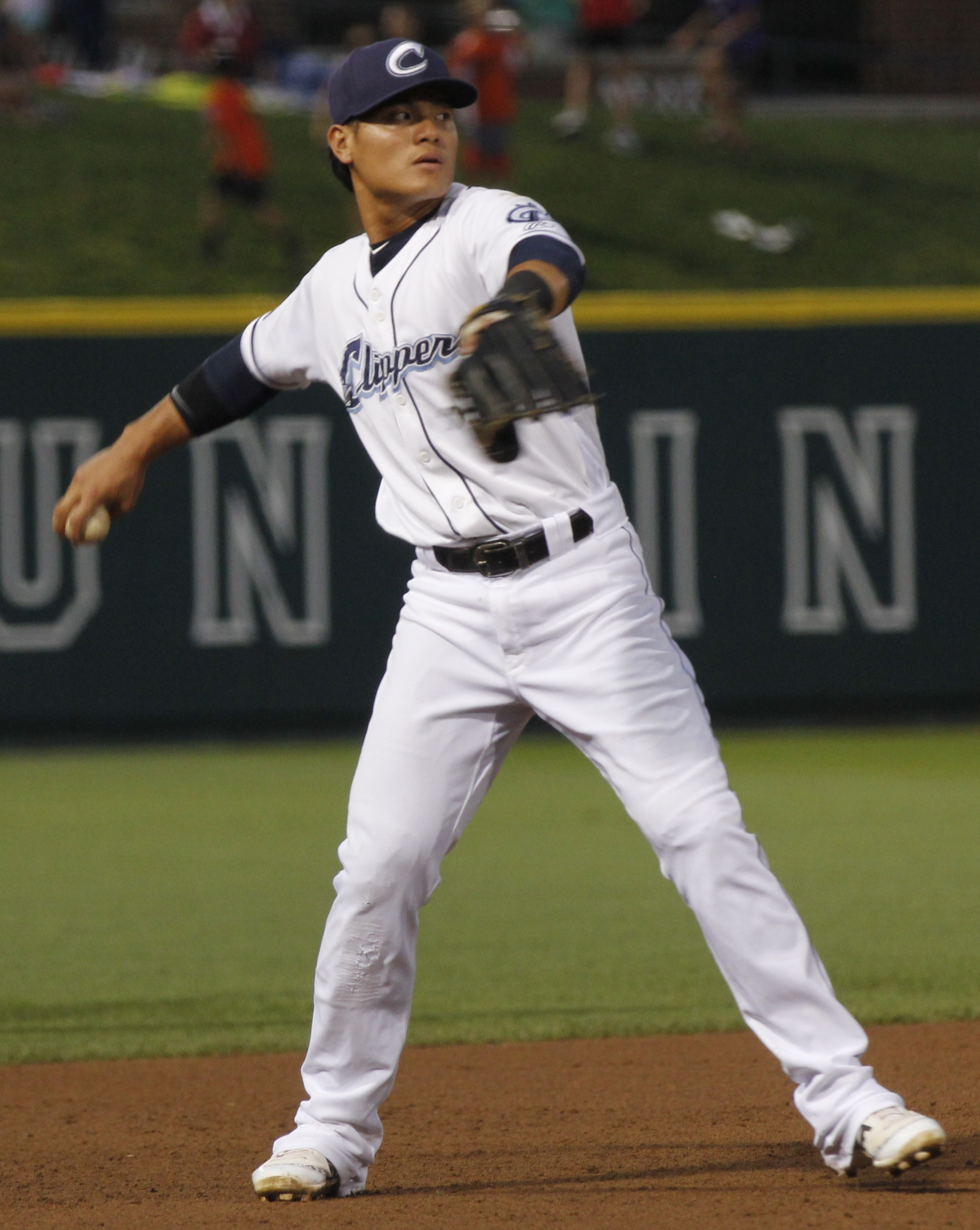
Chang with the Columbus Clippers in 2018

Chang finished the 2016 season with a .259 batting average with 13 home runs and 70 RBIs in 109 games. In 2017, Chang played for the Akron RubberDucks of the Double–A Eastern League, where he hit .220, along with a .461 slugging percentage, with a career-high 24 home runs and 66 RBIs in 126 games. On November 20, 2017, the Indians added Chang to their 40-man roster to protect him from the Rule 5 draft.

MLB.com ranked Chang as Cleveland's sixth-best prospect going into the 2018 season. He spent the 2018 season with the Columbus Clippers of the Triple–A International League, batting .256 with 13 home runs and 62 RBIs in 127 games. He returned to Columbus to begin the 2019 season.

==== Major leagues (2019–2022) ====
On 28 June 2019, the Indians promoted Chang to the major leagues. He debuted that night against the Baltimore Orioles, starting at third base. On 25 August, Chang hit his first career hit and triple against the Kansas City Royals, against starter Eric Skoglund in the third inning and reliever Scott Barlow in the seventh inning. On 9 September, he hit his first major league home run, a three-run homer, against Los Angeles Angels reliever Justin Anderson. Overall with the 2019 Cleveland Indians, Chang batted .178 with one home run and six RBIs in 28 games.

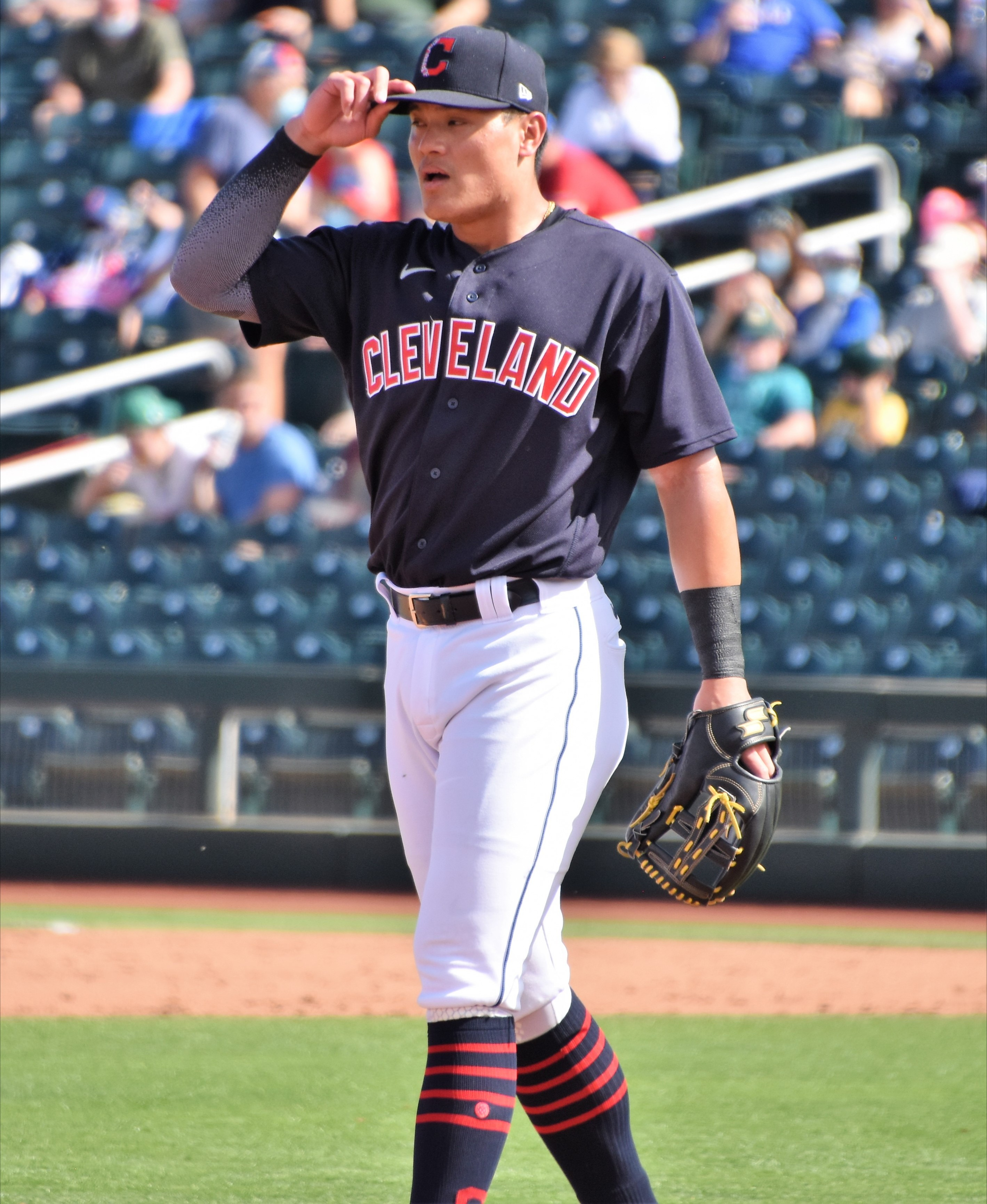
Chang in 2021

Chang played in 10 games during the shortened 2020 season, batting .182 with no home runs and one RBI. Chang started at first base for Cleveland on Opening Day in 2021. He hit his first home run of the season on 5 June, a three-run shot off Baltimore Orioles reliever Adam Plutko. On 3 October, Chang hit a two-run homer in the fifth inning off of Mike Foltynewicz in the team's final game of the season, Chang's last home run with Cleveland. Chang finished the 2021 season with nine home runs and 39 RBIs while batting .228 over 89 games.

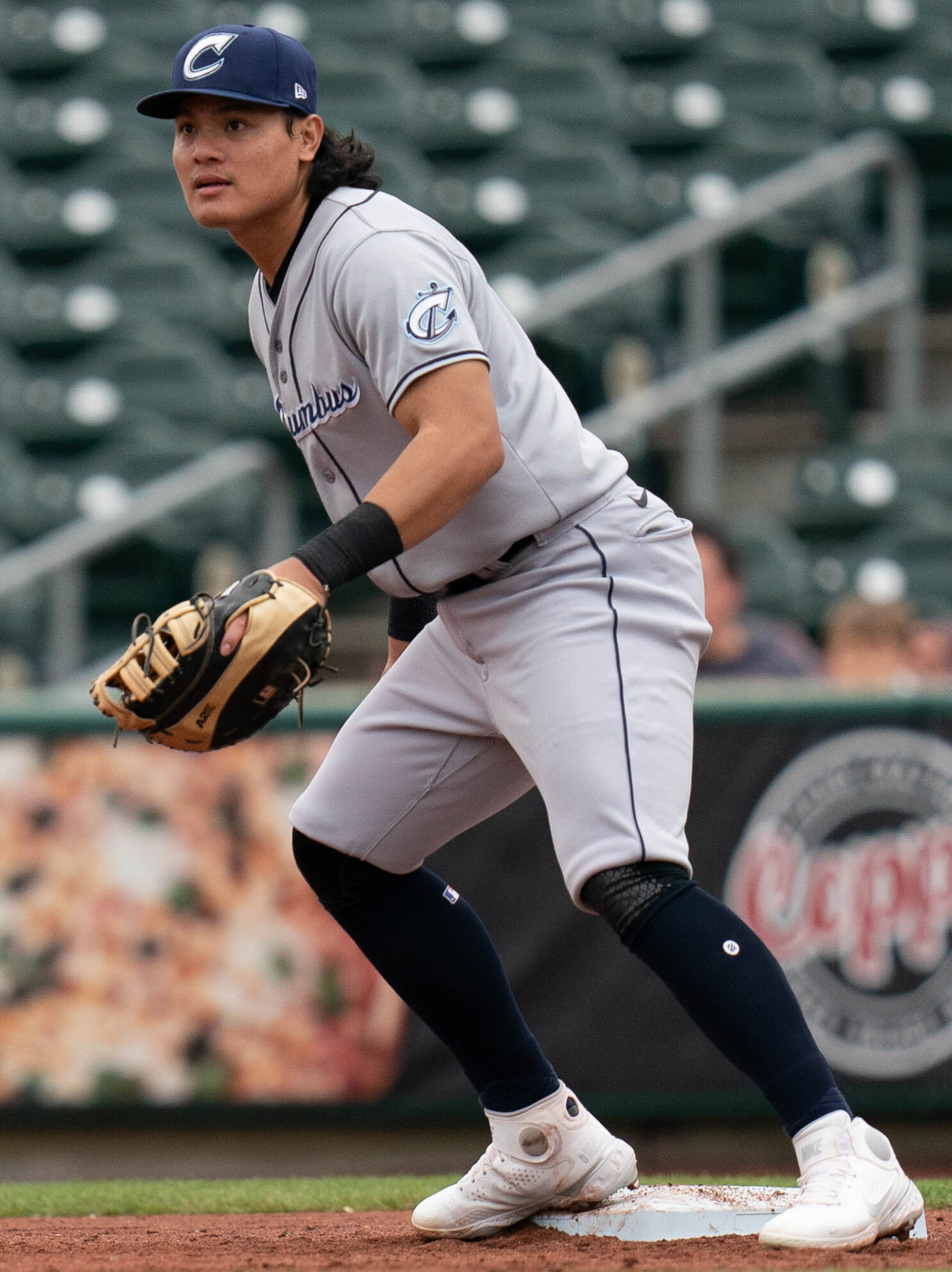
Chang with Columbus in 2022

Chang appeared in four games for Cleveland during the 2022 season; he was 0-for-10 at the plate while striking out seven times. He was designated for assignment on 26 May 2022.

=== Pittsburgh Pirates (2022) ===
On 30 May 2022, the Guardians traded Chang to the Pittsburgh Pirates for cash considerations. In 18 games with the Pirates, he batted .167 with one home run and two RBIs while appearing defensively at first base and second base. He was designated for assignment on 30 June.

=== Tampa Bay Rays (2022) ===
On 5 July 2022, the Tampa Bay Rays claimed Chang off waivers from the Pirates. He was promoted to the Rays' major-league roster on 8 July. In 36 games with the Rays, he batted .260 with three home runs and 12 RBIs, while appearing at every infield position and also pitching two innings. On 9 September, Chang was designated for assignment.

=== Boston Red Sox (2022–2023) ===
On 12 September 2022, the Boston Red Sox claimed Chang off waivers from the Rays. He was added to Boston's major-league roster two days later. In 11 games with the Red Sox, he batted .150 (3-for-20) with one RBI, and made defensive appearances at first base, second base, and shortstop. Overall during the 2022 season, Chang appeared in 51 MLB games for four different teams, batting .222 with three home runs and 13 RBIs. On 18 November, Chang was non-tendered by the Red Sox and became a free agent. On October 13, Chang elected free agency.

The Red Sox re-signed Chang to a one-year, major league contract on 16 February 2023. He made the Red Sox Opening Day roster. In April, he was briefly on paternity leave and missed one game for the birth of a daughter. On 25 April, he was placed on the injured list due to a hamate bone fracture in his left hand. After suffering a setback in his rehab, Chang was transferred to the 60-day injured list on 22 June. He was activated from the injured list on 7 July. In 39 games, he hit .162/.200/.352 with 6 home runs and 18 RBI. On 8 August, Chang was designated for assignment by Boston after Trevor Story was activated from the injured list. On 11 August, it was announced that Chang accepted an outright assignment to Boston's Triple-A affiliate, the Worcester Red Sox. He elected free agency following the season on 13 October.

=== Tampa Bay Rays (second stint) (2024) ===
On 20 February 2024, Chang signed a minor league contract with the Rays. On 1 March, it was announced that Chang would miss six–to–eight weeks with an oblique strain, ending his chances of making the Opening Day roster. In 14 games for the Triple–A Durham Bulls, he batted .293/.431/.512 with two home runs, seven RBI, and two stolen bases. On 18 June, Chang announced that he would be leaving the Rays organization and returning to Taiwan to enter the 2024 CPBL draft.

=== Fubon Guardians (2024–present) ===
On 28 June 2024, Chang was selected by the Fubon Guardians with the first overall pick of the 2024 CPBL mid–season draft. Chang and the Guardians agreed to the largest contract in league history on 11 July, worth NT$92.5 million (US$2.84 million at the time) over three and a half years.

Chang appeared in 47 games in 2024, with 5 doubles, 1 triple, 10 home runs, 30 RBIs, and 29 runs scored. He posted a .270 batting average, a .445 on-base percentage, and a .540 slugging percentage, while striking out 40 times and stealing 4 bases. He suffered a left hand injury during the season.

== International career ==
Chang was selected to the Chinese Taipei national baseball team (Taiwan) roster for the 2023 World Baseball Classic (WBC). He initially declined to play for the national team, preferring to prepare for the upcoming MLB season. The decision garnered widespread backlash from Taiwanese fans, who labelled Chang a "military deserter"; he previously had been exempted from compulsory military service in exchange for representing Taiwan in the 2019 Asian Baseball Championship and other international competitions. Chang reversed his decision, pledging to play for Taiwan "if selected."

At the 2023 tournament, Chang emerged as the breakout player for the team. In a nod to the controversy surrounding his military exemption, he became known for saluting after reaching base; fans nicknamed him "the Minister of Defense." Despite his team failing to reach the quarterfinals, Chang was named the most valuable player of Pool A after batting .438 (7-for-16) with two home runs and eight RBIs in four games. Chang was ultimately selected for the 2023 All-WBC Team as first baseman, making him the first Taiwanese player receive such an award.

Chang played for Chinese Taipei in the 2025 WBC Qualifiers. He delivered a strong performance, hitting a home run in the opening game, batting .389, and hitting 4 doubles, most in the qualifiers as his team qualified for the 2026 WBC.

== Personal life ==
Chang is from the Amis people, an Indigenous Austronesian ethnic group in Taiwan. He and his wife have two children. Chang's brother Chang Jin-de is also a professional baseball player.

== See also ==
- List of Major League Baseball players from Taiwan
