= José De León =

Puerto Rican baseball player (born 1992)

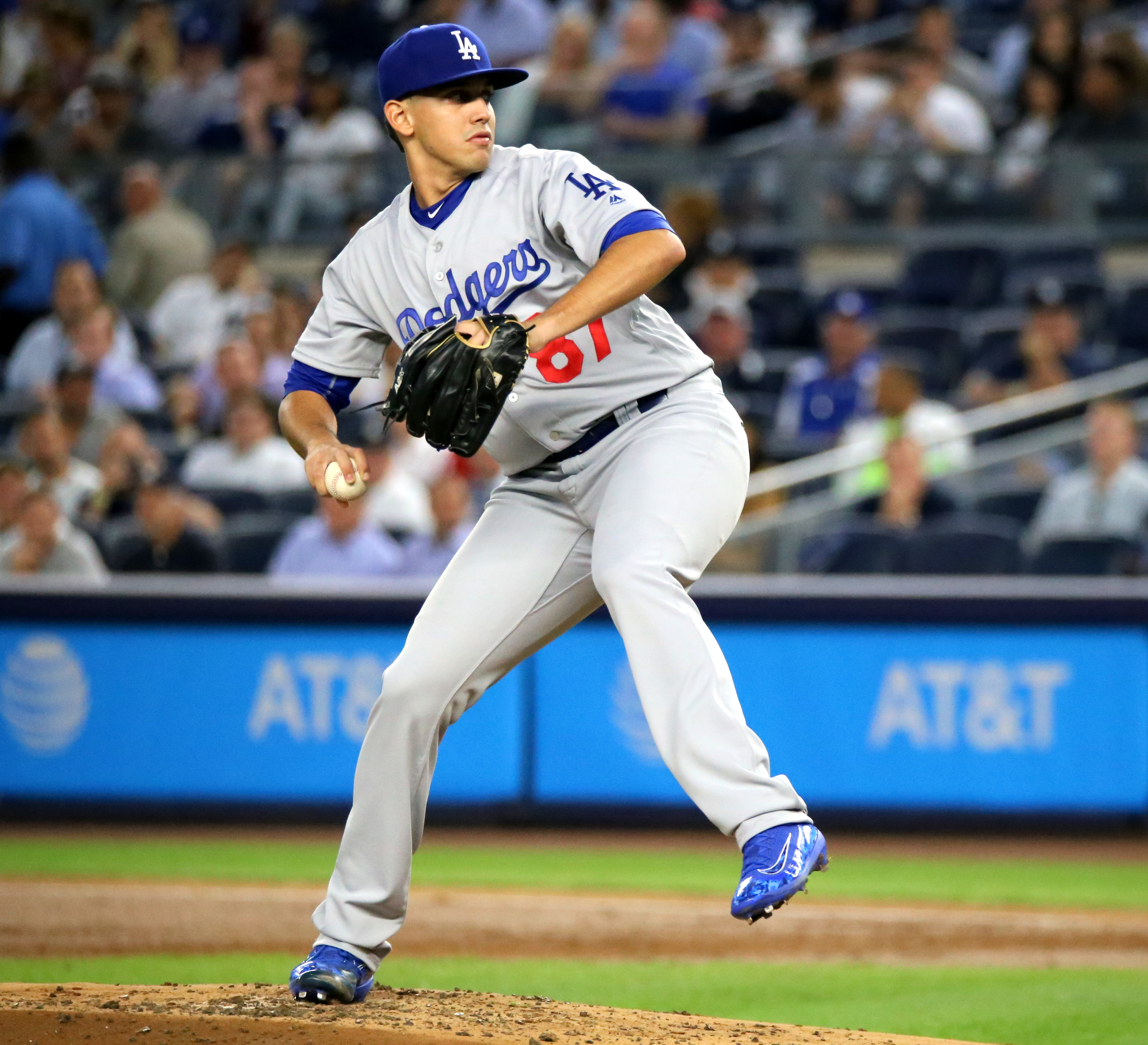
- De León with the Los Angeles Dodgers in 2016

Free agent
- Pitcher
- Born: August 7, 1992 (age 33); Isabela, Puerto Rico
- Bats: Right Throws: Right

MLB debut
- September 4, 2016, for the Los Angeles Dodgers

MLB statistics (through 2025 season)
- Win–loss record: 5–2
- Earned run average: 7.13
- Strikeouts: 92
- Stats at Baseball Reference

Teams
- Los Angeles Dodgers (2016); Tampa Bay Rays (2017, 2019); Cincinnati Reds (2020–2021); Minnesota Twins (2023); Boston Red Sox (2025)
Medals
Men's baseball
Representing Puerto Rico
World Baseball Classic
Silver medal – second place	2017 Los Angeles	Team

José Eugenio De León Domenech (born August 7, 1992) is a Puerto Rican professional baseball pitcher who is a free agent. He has previously played in Major League Baseball (MLB) for the Los Angeles Dodgers, Tampa Bay Rays, Cincinnati Reds, Minnesota Twins, and Boston Red Sox.

== Career ==
=== Los Angeles Dodgers ===
De León played college baseball at Southern University from 2011 to 2013. He was drafted by the Los Angeles Dodgers in the 24th round of the 2013 Major League Baseball draft. He signed with the Dodgers and made his professional debut with the rookie-level Arizona League Dodgers. He was later promoted to the Ogden Raptors. De León returned to Ogden to start the 2014 season. After recording a 2.65 earned run average (ERA) and 77 strikeouts in 54 1/3 innings, he was promoted to the Great Lakes Loons. In his second start with the Loons, De León had 14 strikeouts, breaking Clayton Kershaw's team record of 12 set in 2007. In four starts with Great Lakes, he had a 1.19 ERA with 42 strikeouts in 22 2/3 innings. After the season, he was named the Pioneer League Pitcher of the Year, for his performance that season with Ogden.

De León was assigned to the Rancho Cucamonga Quakes of the California League to start the 2015 season. In seven starts for the Quakes he was 4–1 with a 1.67 ERA and he was promoted to the Double-A Tulsa Drillers of the Texas League on May 18. He was selected to the California League mid-season all-star team but was unable to participate because of his promotion to Double-A. He was selected as a second team Baseball America minor league all-star after the season. He had a 2–6 record in Double-A with a 3.64 ERA and 105 strikeouts. He was given a non-roster invitation to Dodgers spring training. In 2016, he spent the season in Triple-A with the Oklahoma City Dodgers, where he was 7–1 with a 2.61 ERA in 16 starts. He also struck out 111 batters against only 20 walks.

De León had his contract purchased by the Dodgers and was called up to the majors on September 3, 2016, making his debut as the starting pitcher for the Dodgers against the San Diego Padres on September 4. He allowed four runs in six innings in his debut to pick up the win. De León's nine strikeouts (with no walks) was the second most by a Los Angeles Dodgers pitcher in his debut, trailing only Pedro Astacio and Kazuhisa Ishii. In four starts for the Dodgers he was 2–0 with a 6.35 ERA.

=== Tampa Bay Rays ===
On January 23, 2017, the Dodgers traded De León to the Tampa Bay Rays in exchange for second baseman Logan Forsythe. De León started the 2017 season ranked as the Rays' third best prospect and 28th overall by MLB Pipeline. He opened the season on the minor league disabled list due to discomfort in the flexor mass muscle in the forearm, which is often a precursor to Tommy John surgery.

On May 29, De León got his first call-up by the Rays due to a depleted bullpen from a 15 inning victory against the Minnesota Twins the day before. In his Rays debut, he allowed three runs on four hits, two walks, and two strikeouts in 2 2/3 innings pitched, and took the win. He was sent back down the next day.

On June 9, De León was put on the minor league disabled list with a mild lat strain. On August 14, De León was placed on the minor league disabled list for the third time in 2017, this time with elbow tendinitis. De León was diagnosed with a torn ulnar collateral ligament on March 7, 2018. One week later, Dr. James Andrews successfully performed Tommy John surgery, ending De León's 2018 season. De León returned to game action in May 2019. He returned to the Rays active roster on August 14.

=== Cincinnati Reds ===
On November 20, 2019, the Rays traded De León to the Cincinnati Reds in exchange for cash considerations or a player to be named later. In 2020 for Cincinnati, De León registered an 18.00 ERA with 10 strikeouts in six innings of work across five appearances.

De León posted a 4.63 ERA in 12 games for the Triple-A Louisville Bats, but struggled to an 8.35 ERA in 9 games with Cincinnati before being designated for assignment on July 19, 2021. De León was released by the Reds organization on July 23.

=== Boston Red Sox ===
On August 4, 2021, De León agreed to a minor league deal with the Boston Red Sox; he was assigned to the Worcester Red Sox. De León made two appearances for the rookie-level Florida Complex League Red Sox, allowing two runs on three hits with four strikeouts in two innings pitched. He elected free agency following the season on November 7.

=== Toronto Blue Jays ===
On November 29, 2021, De León signed a minor league contract with the Toronto Blue Jays organization, and received an invitation to spring training. He made three appearances for the rookie-level Florida Complex League Blue Jays and Single-A Dunedin Blue Jays before he was elevated to the Triple-A Buffalo Bisons. In 8 games (5 starts), De León logged a 4.35 ERA with 15 strikeouts in 10 1/3 innings pitched. He elected free agency following the season on November 10, 2022.

=== Minnesota Twins ===
On December 13, 2022, De León signed a minor league contract with the Minnesota Twins organization. He began the 2023 season with the Triple-A St. Paul Saints, where he made 9 appearances and recorded a 3.62 ERA with 26 strikeouts and 1 save in 27.1 innings pitched. On May 16, 2023, De León's contract was selected to the active roster. During a game against the Detroit Tigers on June 24, De León injured his arm while warming up in the 8th inning after being brought in to pitch. To that point in the season, he had recorded a 4.67 ERA with 17 strikeouts in 17 1/3 innings pitched. On June 26, it was announced that De León would undergo Tommy John surgery after an MRI revealed a torn ligament in his right elbow. Following the season on October 20, De León was removed from the 40-man roster and sent outright to Triple–A St. Paul. On October 23, De León elected free agency.

=== Boston Red Sox (second stint) ===
On March 4, 2025, De León signed a minor league contract with the Boston Red Sox. He spent the season with the Triple-A Worcester Red Sox, compiling an 0–9 record and 6.93 ERA with 89 strikeouts in 75 1/3 innings pitched across 22 games (13 starts). On September 28, wanting to rest their primary starting rotation for the postseason, the Red Sox selected De León's contract and tabbed him as their starting pitcher for their season finale. He recorded the win after allowing three runs with eight strikeouts across 6 2/3 innings of work. On October 17, De León was removed from the 40-man roster and sent outright to Worcester, however he elected free agency on October 20.

On February 9, 2026, De León signed with the Caliente de Durango of the Mexican League. However, he suffered an injury prior to the season and was released by the club on May 11.

== International career ==
During the 2023 World Baseball Classic (WBC), De León pitched for the Puerto Rico national team. On March 13, 2023, he started versus Israel and retired every batter faced over 5 2/3 innings, including a WBC-record 10 strikeouts, to exit with an ongoing perfect game. Yacksel Ríos, Edwin Díaz, and Duane Underwood Jr. each relieved De León and retired every batter faced, and Martín Maldonado caught on the way to a 10–0 win. The contest ended when Maldonado scored on a walk-off hit in the bottom of the eighth inning that invoked the tournament's mercy rule. However, it did not qualify as an official perfect game per the Elias Sports Bureau, due to lasting fewer than nine innings.

== See also ==
- List of Major League Baseball players from Puerto Rico
