= 2023 World Baseball Classic =

International baseball competition

Tournament details
- Countries: Japan; Taiwan; United States
- Dates: March 8–21, 2023
- Teams: 20 (from 4 confederations)

Final positions
- Champions: Japan (3rd title)
- Runners-up: United States
- Third place: Mexico
- Fourth place: Cuba

Tournament statistics
- Games played: 47
- Attendance: 1,165,857 (24,805 per game)

Awards
- MVP: (Japan) Shohei Ohtani

The 2023 World Baseball Classic (WBC) was an international professional baseball tournament, and the fifth iteration of the World Baseball Classic. It began on March 8, 2023, and ran until March 21.

It was originally scheduled to take place in 2021, four years after the previous tournament, but was canceled in May 2020 due to the COVID-19 pandemic. It was later announced that qualifications for the Classic would start in September 2022, as agreed by World Baseball Classic Inc. (WBCI) The tournament expanded from 16 to 20 national teams, with all teams that participated in the 2017 edition automatically qualifying, plus four additional spots. Unlike in 2009, 2013, and 2017, the U.S. lineup included some distinguished players and attracted significant attention for the tournament.

Japan won their record-extending third title after defeating defending champions United States 3–2 in the championship game, becoming the second team since the Dominican Republic in the 2013 World Baseball Classic to win the WBC with an undefeated record. Shohei Ohtani was named the World Baseball Classic Most Valuable Player.

== Teams ==
=== Qualification ===
Qualification status: Qualified for the 2023 World Baseball Classic Participated in the qualifier but failed to qualify

In January 2020, the WBC announced that the 16 national teams which participated at the 2017 World Baseball Classic would automatically qualify for the 2023 tournament.

A qualifying tournament was scheduled for March 2020 in Tucson, Arizona, United States, to determine the last four teams. Twelve teams were split into two pools, and the top two teams in each pool would qualify. On March 12, 2020, Major League Baseball announced that the qualifying tournaments were being postponed due to the COVID-19 pandemic. The qualification tournament ended up postponing to September 16–21, 2022, for the Africa/Europe qualifiers and September 30 – October 5, 2022, for the Americas/Asia/Oceania qualifiers.

The Czech Republic, Great Britain, and Nicaragua made their first appearance in the World Baseball Classic, while Panama returned after having missed out on the last two previous World Baseball Classic tournaments. This was the third consecutive time that South Africa, the only African team, did not qualify for the World Baseball Classic, and the second consecutive time that both Brazil and Spain did not qualify. With Panama qualified for the World Baseball Classic for the first time since 2009, South Africa now has the longest active WBC appearance drought at 14 years, having not qualified since 2009.

Qualified teams
Region	Team	Qualification method	Prev. apps	Previous best result	WBSC World Rankings
Americas	Canada	Automatically qualified	4	First round (2006, 2009, 2013, 2017)	14
Americas	Colombia	Automatically qualified	1	First round (2017)	11
Americas	Cuba	Automatically qualified	4	Runners-up (2006)	8
Americas	Dominican Republic	Automatically qualified	4	Champions (2013)	9
Americas	Mexico	Automatically qualified	4	Second round (2006, 2009)	5
Americas	Puerto Rico	Automatically qualified	4	Runners-up (2013, 2017)	13
Americas	United States	Automatically qualified as hosts	4	Champions (2017)	3
Americas	Venezuela	Automatically qualified	4	Semifinals (2009)	6
Americas	Panama	Qualifier 2 Winners	2	First round (2006, 2009)	12
Americas	Nicaragua	Qualifier 2 Runners-up	0	None (debut)	17
Asia	China	Automatically qualified	4	First round (2006, 2009, 2013, 2017)	30
Asia	Chinese Taipei	Automatically qualified as hosts	4	Second round (2013)	2
Asia	Japan	Automatically qualified as hosts	4	Champions (2006, 2009)	1
Asia	South Korea	Automatically qualified	4	Runners-up (2009)	4
Europe	Israel	Automatically qualified	1	Second round (2017)	20
Europe	Italy	Automatically qualified	4	Second round (2013)	16
Europe	Netherlands	Automatically qualified	4	Semifinals (2013, 2017)	7
Europe	Great Britain	Qualifier 1 Winners	0	None (debut)	22
Europe	Czech Republic	Qualifier 1 Runners-up	0	None (debut)	15
Oceania	Australia	Automatically qualified	4	First round (2006, 2009, 2013, 2017)	10

=== Pools ===
The initial pool assignments (without the teams to advance from the qualifiers—pot 5) were announced by World Baseball Classic Inc. (WBCI) on July 7, 2022. The complete pools were announced after the conclusion of the qualifiers. Organizers prioritized placement in separate pools of the four nations which reached the semifinals of the 2017 WBC (Japan, the Netherlands, Puerto Rico, and the United States) and the three hosts (Japan, the United States, and Taiwan). Remaining pool assignments were made based on WBSC World Rankings, competitive balance, and commercial and geographic interest.

Note: Numbers in parentheses indicate positions in the WBSC World Rankings at the time of the announcement of the pools.

Pot 1	Pot 2	Pot 3	Pot 4	Pot 5
Japan (1) (H); Chinese Taipei (2) (H); United States (5) (H); Puerto Rico (16)	Netherlands (8); South Korea (3); Mexico (4); Dominican Republic (6)	Venezuela (7); Cuba (9); Australia (10); Colombia (11)	Canada (12); Italy (17); Israel (20); China (21)	Panama (13); Czech Republic (14); Nicaragua (15); Great Britain (24)

== Venues ==
Four stadiums were used during the main tournament.

Pool A	Pool B & Quarterfinals	Pool C	Pool D, Quarterfinals, Semifinals and Championship
Taichung, Taiwan	Tokyo, Japan	Phoenix, United States	Miami, United States
Taichung Intercontinental Baseball Stadium	Tokyo Dome	Chase Field	LoanDepot Park
Capacity: 20,000	Capacity: 45,600	Capacity: 48,686	Capacity: 36,742
2023 World Baseball Classic is located in Eastern Asia		2023 World Baseball Classic is located in the United States	

=== Attendance ===
The first round of the tournament drew 1,010,999 fans across all four venues, nearly double the previous record for the WBC. This included 361,976 fans in Tokyo for Pool B and 295,850 fans in Miami for Pool D. Total attendance for the tournament across all rounds was 1,306,414, the highest in WBC history.

=== Team base camps ===
National squads' base camps

Team	City
Australia	Fuchu
Canada	Mesa
China	Hioki
Chinese Taipei	Taichung
Colombia	Mesa
Cuba	Okinawa, Taipei
Czech Republic	Miyazaki
Dominican Republic	Fort Myers
Great Britain	Phoenix
Israel	Jupiter

Team	City
Italy	Taichung
Japan	Miyazaki
Mexico	Scottsdale
Netherlands	Taichung
Nicaragua	Vero Beach
Panama	Taichung
Puerto Rico	Fort Myers
South Korea	Tucson
United States	Scottsdale
Venezuela	West Palm Beach

== Rosters ==
Participating nations had to submit their final 30-man rosters no later than February 7, 2023. WBC rules required teams to carry at least 14 pitchers and two catchers on their rosters.

== Officiating ==
On March 7, 2023, Major League Baseball and the World Baseball Softball Confederation released the list of officials for the tournament.

=== Umpires ===
- (Australia) Trent Thomas
- (Canada) Chris Graham
- (Canada) Stu Scheurwater
- (Chinese Taipei) Chan-Jung Chang
- (Colombia) Maikol Tibabijo
- (Cuba) Ángel Hernández
- (Dominican Republic) Ramon De Jesus
- (Dominican Republic) Felix Tejeda
- (France) Serge Makouchetchev
- (Germany) Tim Meyer
- (Italy) Fabrizio Fabrizi
- (Japan) Shōji Arisumi
- (Netherlands) Edwin Louisa
- (Nicaragua) Jairo Mendoza
- (Panama) Alejandro Pecero
- (Puerto Rico) Delfin Colon
- (Puerto Rico) Roberto Ortiz
- (Spain) Cuti Suárez
- (South Korea) Ki Taik Park^{Note}
- (United States) Lance Barksdale
- (United States) Dan Bellino
- (United States) Cory Blaser
- (United States) Mark Carlson
- (United States) Laz Díaz
- (United States) Doug Eddings
- (United States) Mike Estabrook
- (United States) Andy Fletcher
- (United States) Chris Guccione
- (United States) Adam Hamari
- (United States) Pat Hoberg
- (United States) Dan Iassogna
- (United States) Ron Kulpa
- (United States) Nic Lentz
- (United States) Will Little
- (United States) Ben May
- (United States) Bill Miller
- (United States) Alan Porter
- (United States) Chris Segal
- (United States) John Tumpane
- (United States) Quinn Wolcott
- (United States) Larry Vanover
- (Venezuela) Jhonatan Biarreta
- (Venezuela) Carlos Torres

^Note Incorrectly listed as Ki Talk Park

=== Supervisors ===
- (United States) Mike Everitt
- (United States) Cris Jones
- (United States) Jeff Kellogg
- (United States) Larry Young

== Prize money ==
The prize money allocation was released by Major League Baseball and the World Baseball Softball Confederation on March 7, 2023. Teams collected prize money for each stage they qualified in. The champions could collect a maximum of $3 million if they were a pool winner.

Stage	Prize money (US$)	No. of teams	Total (US$)
Champions	$1,000,000	1	$1,000,000
Finalists	$500,000	2	$1,000,000
Semifinalists	$500,000	4	$2,000,000
Quarterfinalists	$400,000	8	$3,200,000
Pool winners	$300,000	4	$1,200,000
Participants	$300,000	20	$6,000,000
Total			$14,400,000

== Group stage ==
Scheduled locations and dates are as follows:

Tiebreakers
The ranking of teams in the group stage is determined as follows:
1. Win percentage
2. Head-to-head record
3. Lowest quotient of runs allowed by defensive outs between tied teams
4. Lowest quotient of earned runs allowed by defensive outs between tied teams
5. Highest batting average
6. Drawing of lots

=== Pool A ===
Pool A was contested in Taichung during March 8–12, 2023.

Pos	Team	Pld	W	L	RF	RA	PCT	GB	Qualification
1	Cuba	4	2	2	25	15	.500 (Note: Runs allowed per defensive out recorded: Cuba .139, Italy .157, Netherlands .186, Panama .200, Chinese Taipei .295)	—	Advance to quarterfinals Qualification for 2026 World Baseball Classic
2	Italy	4	2	2	20	17	.500	—	Advance to quarterfinals Qualification for 2026 World Baseball Classic
3	Netherlands	4	2	2	13	19	.500	—	Qualification for 2026 World Baseball Classic
4	Panama	4	2	2	19	21	.500	—	Qualification for 2026 World Baseball Classic
5	Chinese Taipei (H)	4	2	2	26	31	.500	—	

Source: MLB
Rules for classification: Tiebreakers
(H) Hosts
Notes:

Date	Local time	Road team	Score	Home team	Inn.	Venue	Game duration	Attendance	Boxscore
Mar 8, 2023	12:00 NST	Cuba	2–4	Netherlands		Taichung Stadium	3:07	6,501	Boxscore
Mar 8, 2023	19:00 NST	Panama	12–5	Chinese Taipei		Taichung Stadium	4:02	15,540	Boxscore
Mar 9, 2023	12:00 NST	Panama	1–3	Netherlands		Taichung Stadium	2:45	6,048	Boxscore
Mar 9, 2023	19:00 NST	Italy	6–3	Cuba	10	Taichung Stadium	3:43	6,217	Boxscore
Mar 10, 2023	12:30 NST	Cuba	13–4	Panama		Taichung Stadium	4:09	7,023	Boxscore
Mar 10, 2023	19:00 NST	Italy	7–11	Chinese Taipei		Taichung Stadium	3:58	18,799	Boxscore
Mar 11, 2023	12:00 NST	Panama	2–0	Italy		Taichung Stadium	2:57	7,732	Boxscore
Mar 11, 2023	19:00 NST	Netherlands	5–9	Chinese Taipei		Taichung Stadium	3:34	18,826	Boxscore
Mar 12, 2023	12:00 NST	Chinese Taipei	1–7	Cuba		Taichung Stadium	3:21	18,852	Boxscore
Mar 12, 2023	19:00 NST	Netherlands	1–7	Italy		Taichung Stadium	3:00	4,985	Boxscore

=== Pool B ===
Pool B was contested in Tokyo during March 9–13, 2023.

Pos	Team	Pld	W	L	RF	RA	PCT	GB	Qualification
1	Japan (H)	4	4	0	38	8	1.000	—	Advance to quarterfinals Qualification for 2026 World Baseball Classic
2	Australia	4	3	1	29	19	.750	1	Advance to quarterfinals Qualification for 2026 World Baseball Classic
3	South Korea	4	2	2	40	26	.500	2	Qualification for 2026 World Baseball Classic
4	Czech Republic	4	1	3	16	30	.250	3	Qualification for 2026 World Baseball Classic
5	China	4	0	4	10	50	.000	4	

Source: MLB
Rules for classification: Tiebreakers
(H) Hosts

Date	Local time	Road team	Score	Home team	Inn.	Venue	Game duration	Attendance	Boxscore
Mar 9, 2023	12:00 JST	Australia	8–7	South Korea		Tokyo Dome	3:46	15,540	Boxscore
Mar 9, 2023	19:00 JST	China	1–8	Japan		Tokyo Dome	3:41	41,616	Boxscore
Mar 10, 2023	12:00 JST	Czech Republic	8–5	China		Tokyo Dome	3:54	15,625	Boxscore
Mar 10, 2023	19:00 JST	South Korea	4–13	Japan		Tokyo Dome	4:04	41,629	Boxscore
Mar 11, 2023	12:00 JST	China	2–12	Australia	7	Tokyo Dome	2:52	15,708	Boxscore
Mar 11, 2023	19:00 JST	Czech Republic	2–10	Japan		Tokyo Dome	3:26	41,637	Boxscore
Mar 12, 2023	12:00 JST	Czech Republic	3–7	South Korea		Tokyo Dome	2:55	16,129	Boxscore
Mar 12, 2023	19:00 JST	Japan	7–1	Australia		Tokyo Dome	3:18	41,664	Boxscore
Mar 13, 2023	12:00 JST	Australia	8–3	Czech Republic		Tokyo Dome	3:04	16,641	Boxscore
Mar 13, 2023	19:00 JST	South Korea	22–2	China	5	Tokyo Dome	2:37	14,442	Boxscore

=== Pool C ===
Pool C was contested in Phoenix during March 11–15, 2023.

Pos	Team	Pld	W	L	RF	RA	PCT	GB	Qualification
1	Mexico	4	3	1	27	14	.750 (Note: Mexico defeated USA, 11–5)	—	Advance to quarterfinals Qualification for 2026 World Baseball Classic
2	United States (H)	4	3	1	26	16	.750	—	Advance to quarterfinals Qualification for 2026 World Baseball Classic
3	Canada	4	2	2	27	30	.500	1	Qualification for 2026 World Baseball Classic
4	Great Britain	4	1	3	18	31	.250 (Note: Great Britain defeated Colombia, 7–5)	2	Qualification for 2026 World Baseball Classic
5	Colombia	4	1	3	12	19	.250	2	

Source: MLB
Rules for classification: Tiebreakers
(H) Hosts
Notes:

Date	Local time	Road team	Score	Home team	Inn.	Venue	Game duration	Attendance	Boxscore
Mar 11, 2023	12:30 MST	Colombia	5–4	Mexico	10	Chase Field	3:24	28,497	Boxscore
Mar 11, 2023	19:00 MST	Great Britain	2–6	United States		Chase Field	2:54	39,650	Boxscore
Mar 12, 2023	12:00 MST	Great Britain	8–18	Canada	7	Chase Field	3:38	11,555	Boxscore
Mar 12, 2023	19:00 MST	Mexico	11–5	United States		Chase Field	3:41	47,534	Boxscore
Mar 13, 2023	12:00 MST	Colombia	5–7	Great Britain		Chase Field	3:50	10,416	Boxscore
Mar 13, 2023	19:00 MST	Canada	1–12	United States	7	Chase Field	2:20	29,621	Boxscore
Mar 14, 2023	12:00 MST	Canada	5–0	Colombia		Chase Field	2:48	10,571	Boxscore
Mar 14, 2023	19:00 MST	Great Britain	1–2	Mexico		Chase Field	3:05	17,705	Boxscore
Mar 15, 2023	12:00 MST	Mexico	10–3	Canada		Chase Field	3:31	17,245	Boxscore
Mar 15, 2023	19:00 MST	United States	3–2	Colombia		Chase Field	3:02	29,856	Boxscore

=== Pool D ===
Pool D was contested in Miami during March 11–15, 2023.

Pos	Team	Pld	W	L	RF	RA	PCT	GB	Qualification
1	Venezuela	4	4	0	23	9	1.000	—	Advance to quarterfinals Qualification for 2026 World Baseball Classic
2	Puerto Rico	4	3	1	30	12	.750	1	Advance to quarterfinals Qualification for 2026 World Baseball Classic
3	Dominican Republic	4	2	2	19	11	.500	2	Qualification for 2026 World Baseball Classic
4	Israel	4	1	3	4	26	.250	3	Qualification for 2026 World Baseball Classic
5	Nicaragua	4	0	4	4	22	.000	4	

Source: MLB
Rules for classification: Tiebreakers

Date	Local time	Road team	Score	Home team	Inn.	Venue	Game duration	Attendance	Boxscore
Mar 11, 2023	12:00 EST	Nicaragua	1–9	Puerto Rico		LoanDepot Park	2:44	35,399	Boxscore
Mar 11, 2023	19:00 EST	Dominican Republic	1–5	Venezuela		LoanDepot Park	3:19	35,890	Boxscore
Mar 12, 2023	12:00 EDT	Nicaragua	1–3	Israel		LoanDepot Park	2:50	19,955	Boxscore
Mar 12, 2023	19:00 EDT	Venezuela	9–6	Puerto Rico		LoanDepot Park	3:36	35,615	Boxscore
Mar 13, 2023	12:00 EDT	Dominican Republic	6–1	Nicaragua		LoanDepot Park	3:09	31,696	Boxscore
Mar 13, 2023	19:00 EDT	Israel	0–10	Puerto Rico	8	LoanDepot Park	2:30	27,813	Boxscore
Mar 14, 2023	12:00 EDT	Nicaragua	1–4	Venezuela		LoanDepot Park	2:53	21,873	Boxscore
Mar 14, 2023	19:00 EDT	Israel	0–10	Dominican Republic	7	LoanDepot Park	2:44	33,307	Boxscore
Mar 15, 2023	12:00 EDT	Venezuela	5–1	Israel		LoanDepot Park	2:47	18,277	Boxscore
Mar 15, 2023	19:00 EDT	Puerto Rico	5–2	Dominican Republic		LoanDepot Park	3:13	36,025	Boxscore

== Knockout stage ==
The top two teams from each pool advanced to the single elimination bracket. These games were contested from March 15–21, 2023. Tokyo hosted two of the quarterfinals, while the other two quarterfinals, the semifinals, and the championship game took place in Miami.

=== Bracket ===
Quarterfinals
March 15 – Tokyo
Australia	3
Cuba	4
March 18 – Miami
United States	9
Venezuela	7
March 17 – Miami
Puerto Rico	4
Mexico	5
March 16 – Tokyo
Italy	3
Japan	9

Semifinals
March 19 – Miami
Cuba	2
United States	14
March 20 – Miami
Mexico	5
Japan	6

Championship
March 21 – Miami
United States	2
Japan	3

=== Quarterfinals ===
Date	Local time	Road team	Score	Home team	Inn.	Venue	Game duration	Attendance	Boxscore
Mar 15, 2023	19:00 JST	Australia	3–4	Cuba		Tokyo Dome	3:24	35,061	Boxscore
Mar 16, 2023	19:00 JST	Italy	3–9	Japan		Tokyo Dome	3:24	41,723	Boxscore
Mar 17, 2023	19:00 EDT	Puerto Rico	4–5	Mexico		LoanDepot Park	3:17	35,817	Boxscore
Mar 18, 2023	19:00 EDT	United States	9–7	Venezuela		LoanDepot Park	3:46	35,792	Boxscore

=== Semifinals ===
Date	Local time	Road team	Score	Home team	Inn.	Venue	Game duration	Attendance	Boxscore
Mar 19, 2023	19:00 EDT	Cuba	2–14	United States		LoanDepot Park	3:28	35,779	Boxscore
Mar 20, 2023	19:00 EDT	Mexico	5–6	Japan		LoanDepot Park	3:36	35,933	Boxscore

=== Final ===
March 21, 2023 19:00 EDT (UTC−4) at LoanDepot Park in Miami, United States
Team	1	2	3	4	5	6	7	8	9	R	H	E
United States	0	1	0	0	0	0	0	1	0	2	9	0
Japan	0	2	0	1	0	0	0	0	X	3	5	0
WP: Shōta Imanaga (1–0) LP: Merrill Kelly (0–1) Sv: Shohei Ohtani (1); Home runs: USA: Trea Turner (5), Kyle Schwarber (2); JPN: Munetaka Murakami (1), Kazuma Okamoto (2); Attendance: 36,098; Umpires: HP – Lance Barksdale, 1B – John Tumpane, 2B – Edward Pinales, 3B – Ramiro Alfaro, LF – Jong Chui Park, RF – Quinn Wolcott; Boxscore

== Final standings ==
The final standings were calculated by the WBSC for inclusion in the WBSC Men's Baseball World Rankings system.

In the final standings, teams that were eliminated in the same round were given the same number of points, regardless of final record. Teams that placed third were ranked above those who placed in 4th, regardless of record. The same can be said for teams that placed in 4th with their ranking compared to those who placed in 5th.

Rk	Team	W	L	Tiebreaker
1st place, gold medalist(s)	Japan	7	0	–
Lost in Final
2nd place, silver medalist(s)	United States	5	2	–
Lost in Semifinals
3rd place, bronze medalist(s)	Mexico	4	2	–
4	Cuba	3	3	–
Lost in Quarterfinals
5	Venezuela	4	1	–
6	Puerto Rico	3	2	RA/Outs = 0.132
7	Australia	3	2	RA/Outs = 0.183
8	Italy	2	3	–
3rd place in First Round pools
9	Dominican Republic	2	2	RA/Outs = 0.111
10	Netherlands	2	2	RA/Outs = 0.186
11	South Korea	2	2	RA/Outs = 0.280
12	Canada	2	2	RA/Outs = 0.323
4th place in First Round pools
13	Panama	2	2	–
14	Israel	1	3	RA/Outs = 0.274
15	Czech Republic	1	3	RA/Outs = 0.294
16	Great Britain	1	3	RA/Outs = 0.333
5th place in First Round pools
17	Chinese Taipei	2	2	–
18	Colombia	1	3	–
19	Nicaragua	0	4	RA/Outs = 0.222
20	China	0	4	RA/Outs = 0.595

2023 World Baseball Classic champions

Japan
Third title

== Awards ==
=== Most Valuable Players ===
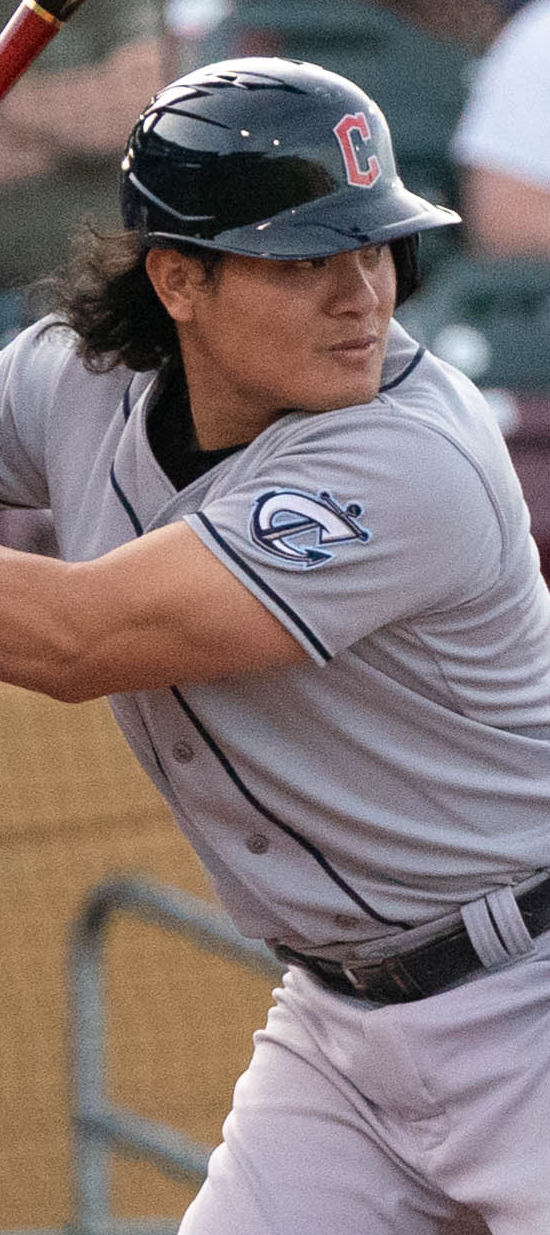
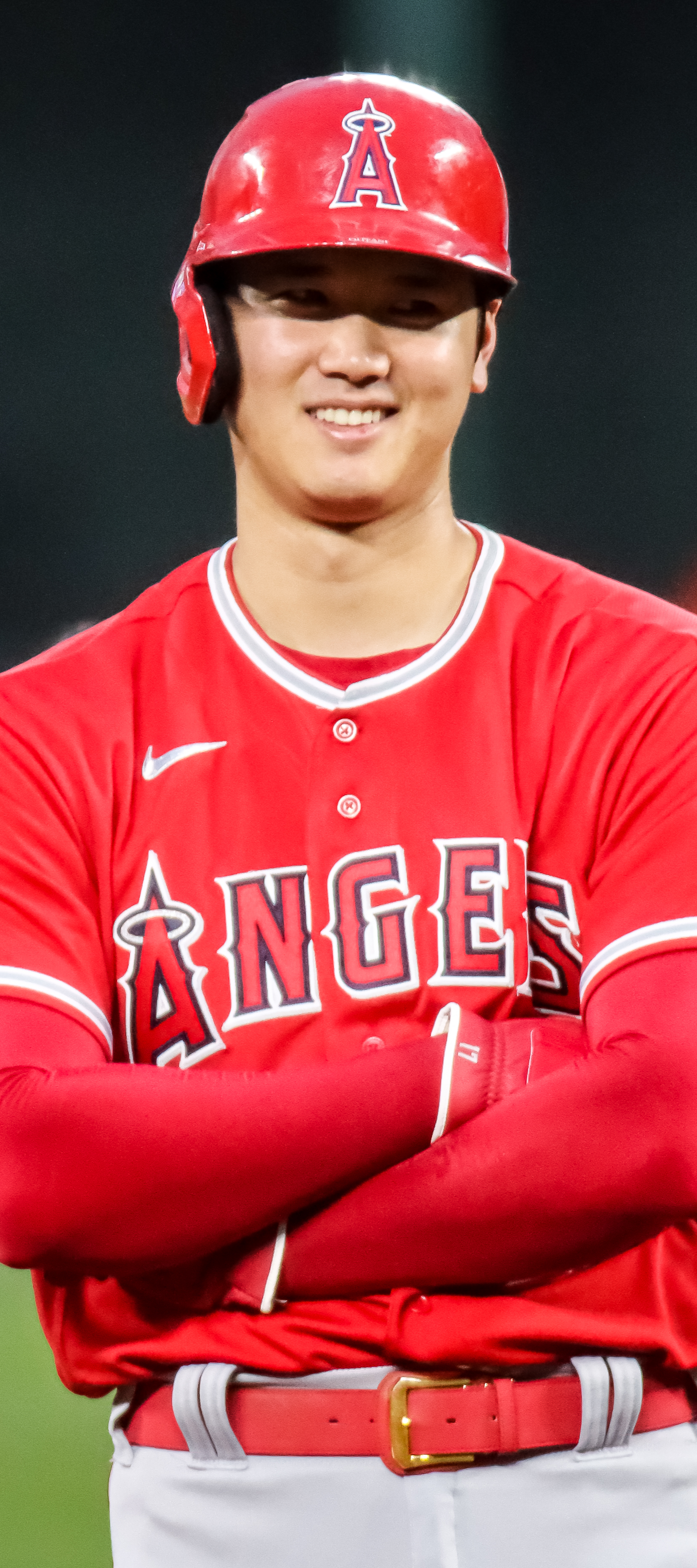
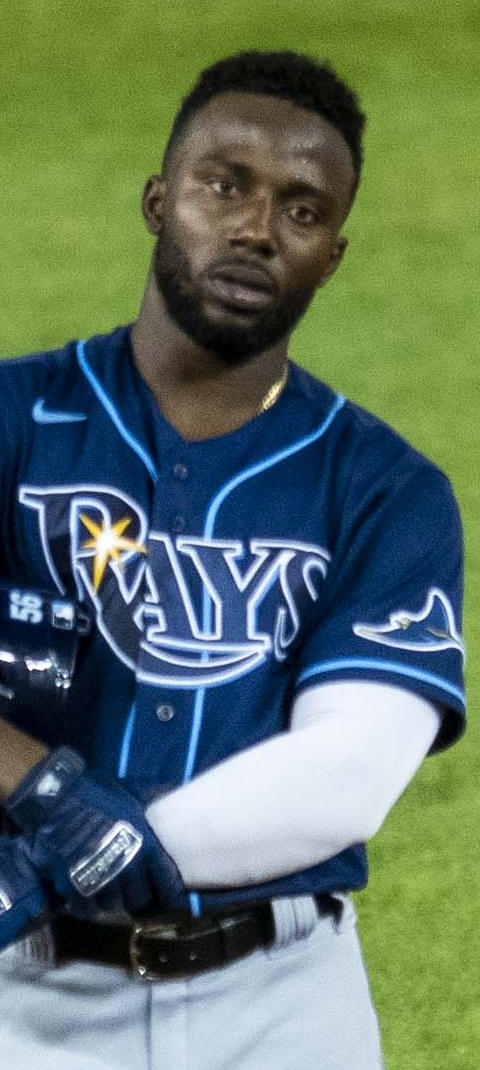
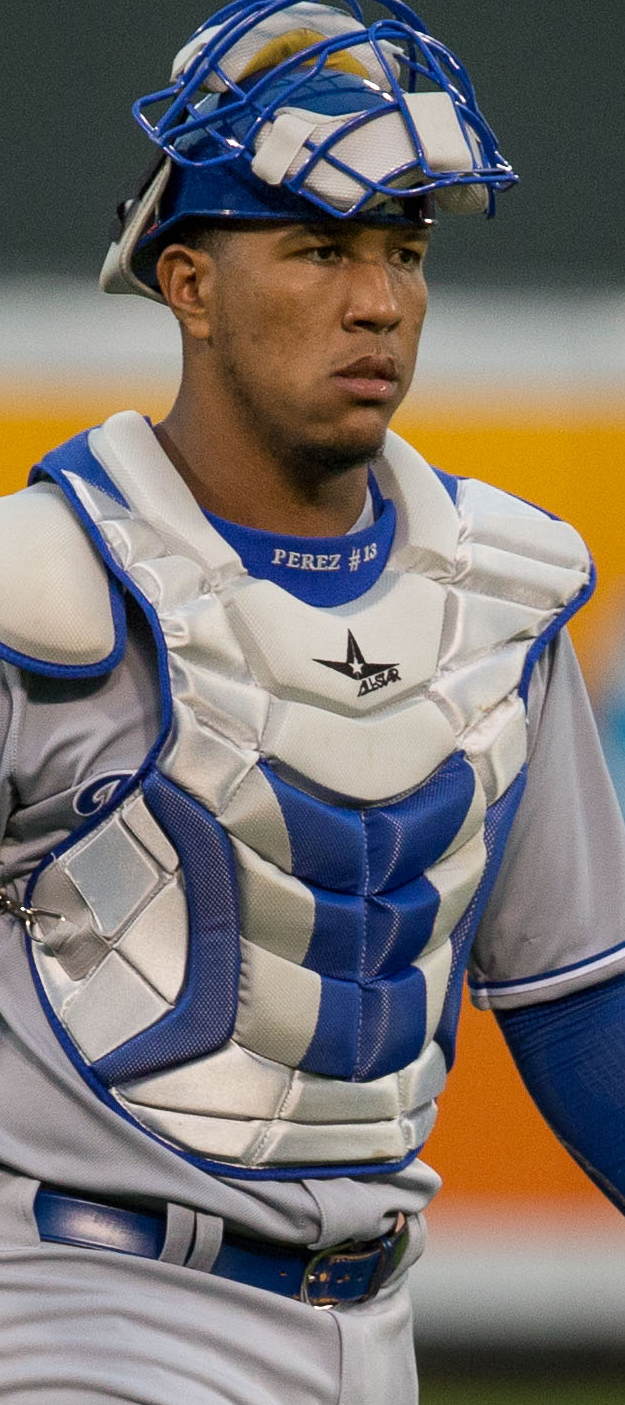
MVPs of each pools (from left to right);
Pool A – Yu Chang of Chinese Taipei
Pool B – Shohei Ohtani of Japan
Pool C – Randy Arozarena of Mexico
Pool D – Salvador Pérez of Venezuela

==== Group stage ====
- Pool A – (Chinese Taipei) Yu Chang
- Pool B – (Japan) Shohei Ohtani
- Pool C – (Mexico) Randy Arozarena
- Pool D – (Venezuela) Salvador Pérez

==== Knockout stage ====
- Tournament – (Japan) Shohei Ohtani

=== 2023 All-World Baseball Classic team ===
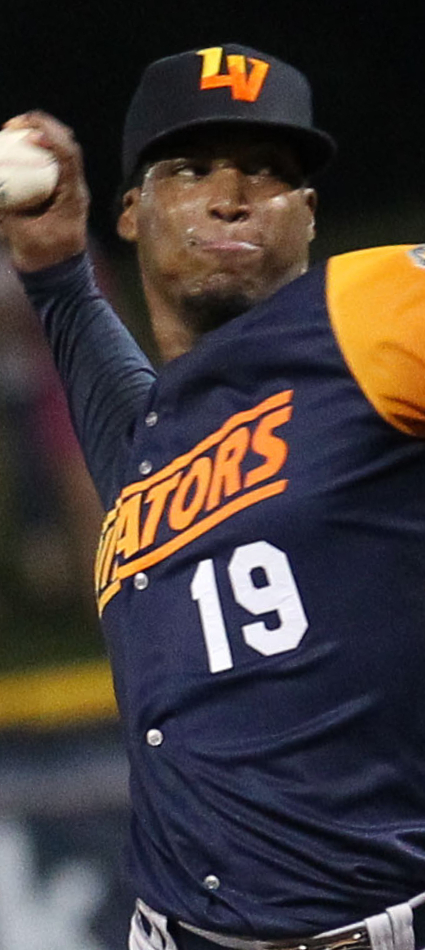
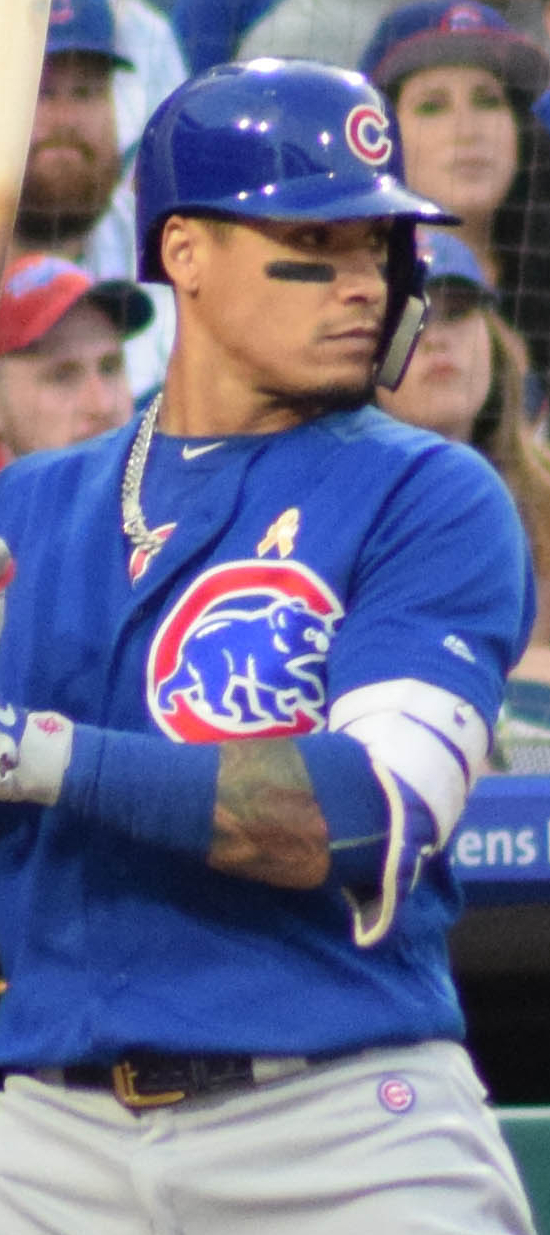
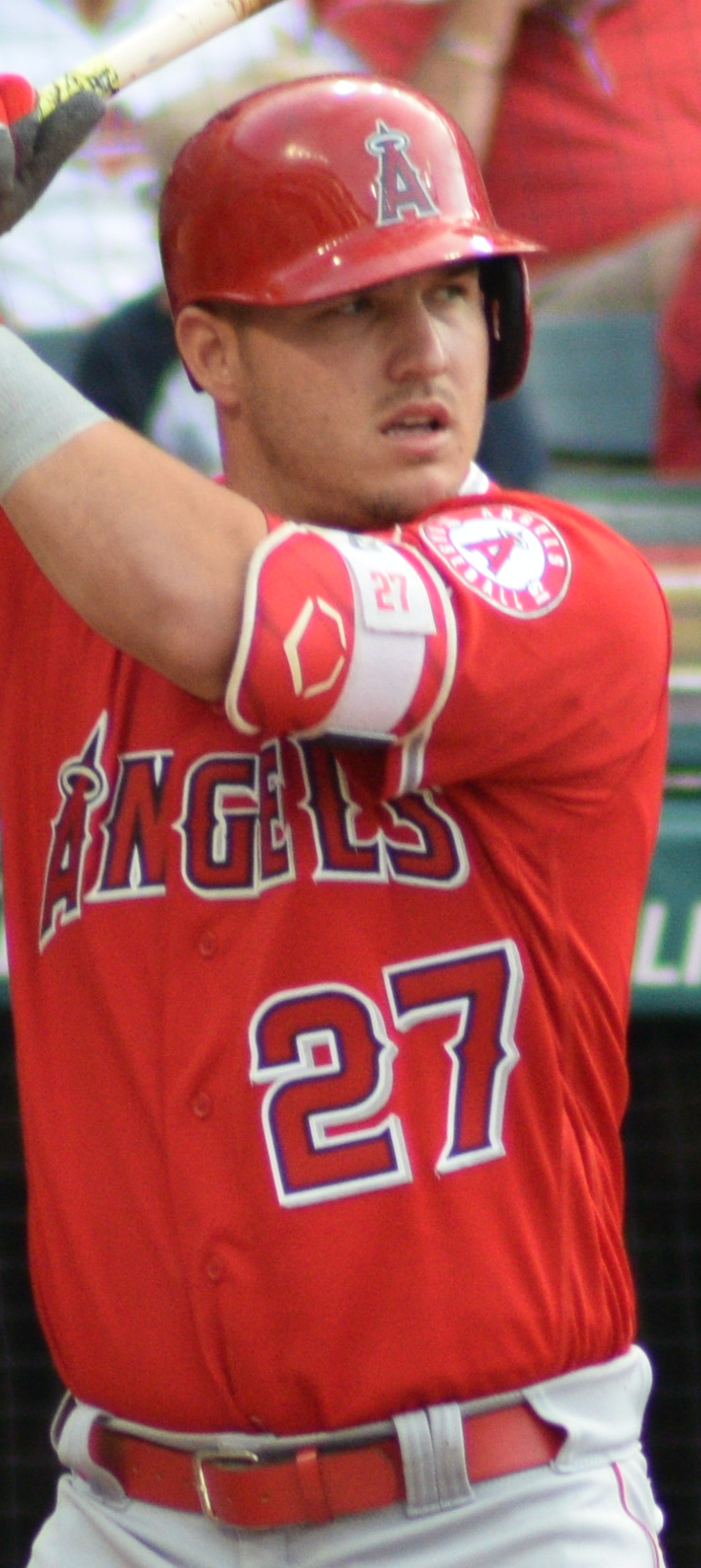
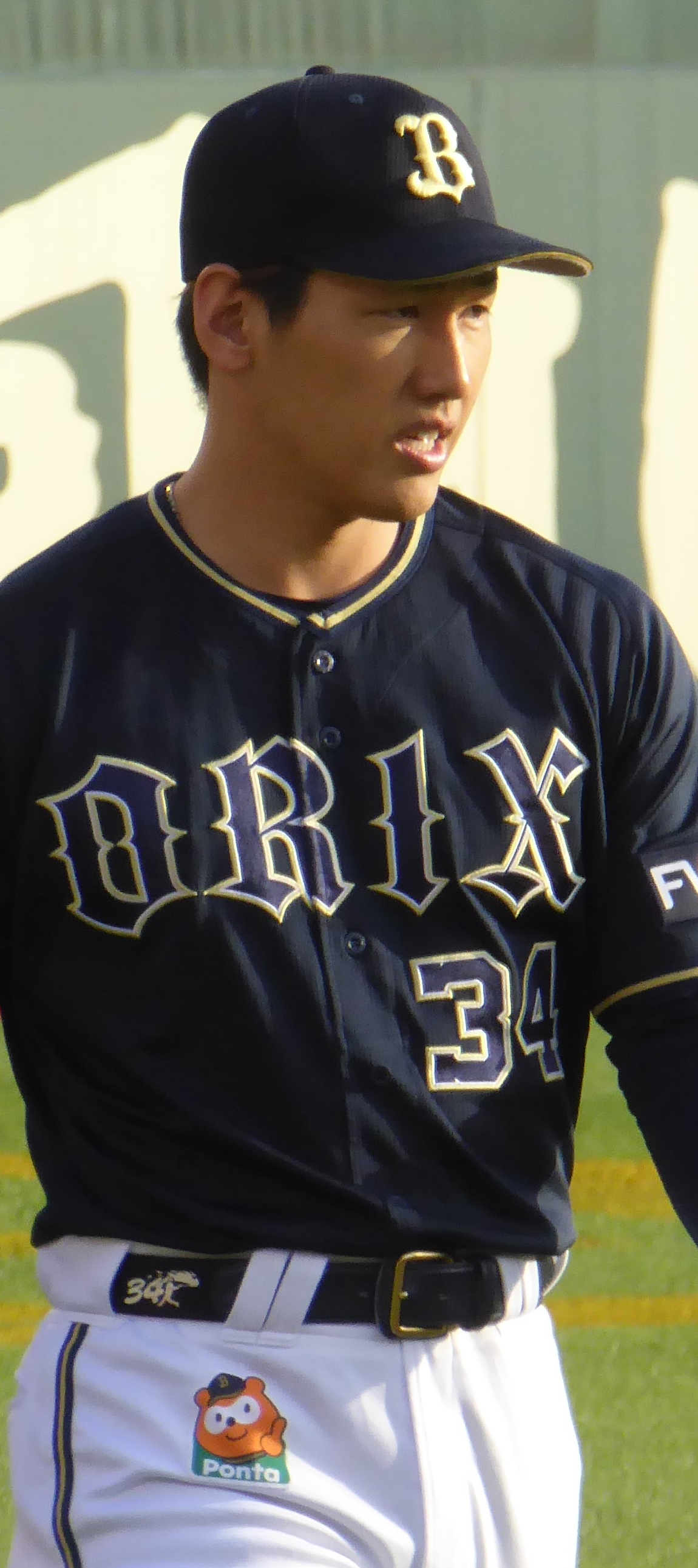
Players named to the All-WBC Team (from left to right);
Pitcher – Miguel Romero of Cuba
Second baseman – Javier Báez of Puerto Rico
Outfielder – Mike Trout of the United States
Outfielder – Masataka Yoshida of Japan

Position	Player
C	(Venezuela) Salvador Pérez
1B	(Chinese Taipei) Yu Chang
2B	(Puerto Rico) Javier Báez
3B	(Cuba) Yoán Moncada
SS	(United States) Trea Turner
OF	(Mexico) Randy Arozarena
OF	(United States) Mike Trout
OF	(Japan) Masataka Yoshida
DH	(Japan) Shohei Ohtani
P	(Japan) Shohei Ohtani
P	(Cuba) Miguel Romero
P	(Mexico) Patrick Sandoval

== Statistical leaders ==
=== Batting ===
Statistic	Name	Total/Avg
Batting average*	(Canada) Tyler O'Neill	.615
Hits	5 tied with (Note: Nolan Arenado, Mookie Betts, Joey Meneses, Yoan Moncada, Shohei Ohtani)	10
Runs	(Japan) Kensuke Kondoh (Japan) Shohei Ohtani	9
Home runs	(United States) **Trea Turner**	**5**
Runs batted in	(Japan) **Masataka Yoshida**	**13**
Strikeouts	(Japan) Munetaka Murakami	13
Stolen bases	(United Kingdom) **Chavez Young**	**5**
On-base percentage*	(Canada) Tyler O'Neill	.722
Slugging percentage*	(Canada) Edouard Julien	1.154
OPS*	(Canada) Edouard Julien	1.821

* Minimum 2.7 plate appearances per team game

**Bold** indicates all-time best in a single tournament of the World Baseball Classic

=== Pitching ===
Statistic	Name	Total/Avg
Wins	5 tied with (Note: Shohei Ohtani, JoJo Romero, Miguel Romero, José Ruiz, Adam Wainwright)	2
Losses	(Nicaragua) J. C. Ramírez	2
Saves	4 tied with (Note: Wendell Floranus, Giovanny Gallegos, Ryan Pressly, Sung Chia-hao)	2
Innings pitched	(Japan) Shohei Ohtani	9.2
Hits allowed	(United States) Adam Wainwright	10
Runs allowed	(United States) Daniel Bard	8
Earned runs allowed	(United States) Daniel Bard	8
Earned run average*	7 tied with (Note: Harold Arauz, José De León, Miguel Romero, Cristian Javier, Dean Kremer, Humberto Mejía, Se Woong Park, Noah Skirrow)	0.00
Walks	(China) Xiang Wang	8
Strikeouts	(Cuba) Miguel Romero	13
WHIP*	(Puerto Rico) José De León	0.00

* Minimum 0.8 innings pitched per team game

== Broadcasting ==
=== Television ratings ===
The Japan–South Korea pool B game drew a household viewership of 44.4% in Japan and 11.7% in South Korea. The broadcast averaged 29.9 million Japanese viewers (28.9% individual viewership) and 2.7 million Korean viewers. Rating indicated that 62.343 million Japanese watched at least one minute of the game. The Korean rating in that game was the second-most-watched WBC game in South Korea, after the 2009 Japan-South Korea final.

The Japan–Italy quarterfinal game broke the Japanese WBC viewership record. It drew an average 48.0% household viewership in Japan and averaged 38.2 million viewers.

In the United States, the World Baseball Classic was carried by Fox Sports for the first time, with games split among six Fox networks. The championship game drew 5.2 million average viewers in the US, peaking at 6.5 million viewers in the final 15 minutes, a new American record for a WBC game. The Japan–Mexico semifinal (2.55M average viewers), the United States-Venezuela quarterfinal (2.52M average viewers), and the United States-Cuba semifinal (2.25M average viewers), were the 5th, 6th and 7th largest World Baseball Classic audiences, respectively, in the United States.

In Puerto Rico, the Pool D game between Puerto Rico and the Dominican Republic was viewed by 62% of households.

=== Broadcasting rights ===
Territory	Rights holder(s)	Ref.
Africa	ESPN	
Brazil	BandSports	
Canada	Sportsnet; TVA Sports (French)	
Central America	Tigo Sports	
Caribbean	SportsMax	
China	Bilibili; Kuaishou; Weibo; Douyin	
Colombia	Win Sports	
Cuba	ICRT; Tele Rebelde	
Czech Republic	ČT	
Dominican Republic	Pio Deportes; Tele Antillas; Coral 39	
France	beIN Sports	
German-speaking countries	More Than Sports TV	
Hungary	Sport TV	
Israel	Sport 5	
Italy	Sky Italia	
Japan	Japan Consortium; TBS (JNN); TV Asahi (ANN); J Sports; Amazon Prime Video	
Mexico	Imagen	
Netherlands	ESPN	
Nordic countries	Viaplay	
Oceania	ESPN	
Panama	TVN	
Puerto Rico	WAPA Deportes	
South America	DirecTV	
Southeast Asia & Hong Kong	SPOTV	
South Korea	Korean Consortium; SBS; KBS; MBC; Wavve; SPOTV	
Taiwan	EBC (EBC News) (Note: Cable TV broadcast only); ELTA Sports	
Turkey	Saran Media	
United Kingdom & Ireland	BT Sport	
United States	Fox; Fox Sports 1; Fox Sports 2; Tubi; Fox Deportes (Spanish)	
Venezuela	Inter/ByM Sport; Venevisión; IVC; SimpleTV; Televen; TVes	
