= 2023 World Baseball Classic Pool D =

Tournament details
- Country: United States
- Cities: Miami, Florida
- Venue: LoanDepot Park
- Dates: March 11-15
- Teams: 5

Final positions
- Champions: Venezuela
- Runners-up: Puerto Rico

Awards
- MVP: (Venezuela) Salvador Pérez

The 2023 World Baseball Classic Pool D was the fourth of four pools of the 2023 World Baseball Classic that took place from March 11 – 15 at LoanDepot Park in Miami, Florida. The top two teams automatically qualify for the top eight knockout stage, with the entire bottom half of the bracket in Miami. The teams in this pool consisted of Dominican Republic, Israel, newcomer Nicaragua, Puerto Rico, and Venezuela.

With Venezuela winning all games and advancing to the quarterfinals as pool winners, the game between Puerto Rico and the Dominican Republic on the last day determined the second quarterfinal spot, with the winner advancing and the loser being eliminated. Puerto Rico defeated the Dominican Republic 5–2 to advance, with celebrations cut short as closer Edwin Díaz suffered an injury during the celebration. Nicaragua lost all games and was relegated to the 2026 World Baseball Classic qualifiers.

== Teams ==
Draw position	Team	Pot	Confederation	Method of qualification	Date of qualification	Finals appearance	Last appearance	Previous best performance	WBSC Rankings
D1	Puerto Rico (Note: Puerto Rico are indirect hosts due to being the home team for three of their four matches in this group.)	1	WBSC Americas	2017 participants	March 6, 2017	5th	2017	Runners-up (2013, 2017)	13
D3	Dominican Republic	2	WBSC Americas	2017 participants	March 6, 2017	5th	2017	Champions (2013)	9
D2	Venezuela	3	WBSC Americas	2017 participants	March 6, 2017	5th	2017	Third place (2009)	6
D4	Israel	4	WBSC Europe	2017 participants	March 6, 2017	2nd	2017	Quarterfinals (2017)	20
D5	Nicaragua	5	WBSC Americas	Qualifiers Pool B runners-up	October 5, 2022	1st	—	—	17

== Standings ==
Pos	Team	Pld	W	L	RF	RA	PCT	GB	Qualification
1	Venezuela	4	4	0	23	9	1.000	—	Advance to quarterfinals Qualification for 2026 World Baseball Classic
2	Puerto Rico	4	3	1	30	12	.750	1	Advance to quarterfinals Qualification for 2026 World Baseball Classic
3	Dominican Republic	4	2	2	19	11	.500	2	Qualification for 2026 World Baseball Classic
4	Israel	4	1	3	4	26	.250	3	Qualification for 2026 World Baseball Classic
5	Nicaragua	4	0	4	4	22	.000	4	

Source: MLB
Rules for classification: Tiebreakers

== Summary ==
Date	Local time	Road team	Score	Home team	Inn.	Venue	Game duration	Attendance	Boxscore
Mar 11, 2023	12:00 EST	Nicaragua	1–9	Puerto Rico		LoanDepot Park	2:44	35,399	Boxscore
Mar 11, 2023	19:00 EST	Dominican Republic	1–5	Venezuela		LoanDepot Park	3:19	35,890	Boxscore
Mar 12, 2023	12:00 EDT	Nicaragua	1–3	Israel		LoanDepot Park	2:50	19,955	Boxscore
Mar 12, 2023	19:00 EDT	Venezuela	9–6	Puerto Rico		LoanDepot Park	3:36	35,615	Boxscore
Mar 13, 2023	12:00 EDT	Dominican Republic	6–1	Nicaragua		LoanDepot Park	3:09	31,696	Boxscore
Mar 13, 2023	19:00 EDT	Israel	0–10	Puerto Rico	8	LoanDepot Park	2:30	27,813	Boxscore
Mar 14, 2023	12:00 EDT	Nicaragua	1–4	Venezuela		LoanDepot Park	2:53	21,873	Boxscore
Mar 14, 2023	19:00 EDT	Israel	0–10	Dominican Republic	7	LoanDepot Park	2:44	33,307	Boxscore
Mar 15, 2023	12:00 EDT	Venezuela	5–1	Israel		LoanDepot Park	2:47	18,277	Boxscore
Mar 15, 2023	19:00 EDT	Puerto Rico	5–2	Dominican Republic		LoanDepot Park	3:13	36,025	Boxscore

== Games ==
=== Nicaragua vs Puerto Rico ===
March 11, 2023 12:00 PM EST at LoanDepot Park in Miami, United States
Team	1	2	3	4	5	6	7	8	9	R	H	E
Nicaragua	0	0	0	0	1	0	0	0	0	1	4	1
Puerto Rico	1	0	0	0	5	0	3	0	x	9	11	0
WP: Nicholas Padilla (1–0) LP: J. C. Ramírez (0–1); Home runs: NCA: Elian Miranda (1); PUR: None; Attendance: 35,399; Umpires: HP – Mike Estabrook, 1B – Alejandro Pecero, 2B – Ángel Hernández, 3B – Chris Graham; Boxscore

=== Dominican Republic vs Venezuela ===
March 11, 2023 19:00 PM EST at LoanDepot Park in Miami, United States
Team	1	2	3	4	5	6	7	8	9	R	H	E
Dominican Republic	1	0	0	0	0	0	0	0	0	1	6	1
Venezuela	0	1	0	2	0	1	0	1	X	5	9	1
WP: José Ruiz (1–0) LP: Sandy Alcántara (0–1); Home runs: DOM: None; VEN: Anthony Santander (1); Attendance: 35,890; Umpires: HP – Andy Fletcher, 1B – Tim Meyer, 2B – Ron Kulpa, 3B – Maikol Tibabijo; Boxscore

=== Nicaragua vs Israel ===
March 12, 2023 12:00 PM EDT at LoanDepot Park in Miami, United States
Team	1	2	3	4	5	6	7	8	9	R	H	E
Nicaragua	0	0	0	0	1	0	0	0	0	1	4	1
Israel	0	0	0	0	0	0	0	3	x	3	7	0
WP: Richard Bleier (1–0) LP: Jonathan Loáisiga (0–1) Sv: Robert Stock (1); Attendance: 19,955; Umpires: HP – Maikol Tibabijo, 1B – Ron Kulpa, 2B – Tim Meyer, 3B – Andy Fletcher; Boxscore

=== Venezuela vs Puerto Rico ===
March 12, 2023 19:00 PM EDT at LoanDepot Park in Miami, United States
Team	1	2	3	4	5	6	7	8	9	R	H	E
Venezuela	4	3	0	1	1	0	0	0	0	9	12	1
Puerto Rico	0	1	0	0	0	4	0	1	0	6	7	1
WP: Pablo López (1–0) LP: José Berríos (0–1) Sv: Silvino Bracho (1); Home runs: VEN: Anthony Santander (2), Salvador Pérez (1); PUR: Eddie Rosario (1); Attendance: 35,615; Umpires: HP – Chris Guccione, 1B – Chris Graham, 2B – Alejandro Pecero, 3B – Mike Estabrook; Boxscore

=== Dominican Republic vs Nicaragua ===
March 13, 2023 12:00 PM EDT at LoanDepot Park in Miami, United States
Team	1	2	3	4	5	6	7	8	9	R	H	E
Dominican Republic	1	0	1	2	0	1	1	0	0	6	12	0
Nicaragua	0	0	0	0	0	0	0	1	0	1	5	1
WP: Cristian Javier (1–0) LP: J. C. Ramírez (0–1); Home runs: DOM: Juan Soto (1), Manny Machado (1); NCA: None; Attendance: 31,696; Umpires: HP – Chris Graham, 1B – Mike Estabrook, 2B – Maikol Tibabijo, 3B – Ángel Hernández; Boxscore

=== Israel vs Puerto Rico ===
March 13, 2023 19:00 PM EDT at LoanDepot Park in Miami, United States
Team	1	2	3	4	5	6	7	8	9	R	H	E
Israel	0	0	0	0	0	0	0	0	X	0	0	2
Puerto Rico	3	3	0	0	3	0	0	1	X	10	11	0
WP: José De León (1–0) LP: Colton Gordon (0–1); Attendance: 27,813; Umpires: HP – Ron Kulpa, 1B – Alejandro Pecero, 2B – Chris Guccione, 3B – Tim Meyer; Boxscore

=== Nicaragua vs Venezuela ===
March 14, 2023 12:00 PM EDT at LoanDepot Park in Miami, United States
Team	1	2	3	4	5	6	7	8	9	R	H	E
Nicaragua	0	1	0	0	0	0	0	0	0	1	11	0
Venezuela	0	0	0	3	1	0	0	0	x	4	7	0
WP: José Ruiz (2–0) LP: Rodney Theophile (0–1) Sv: José Alvarado (1); Attendance: 21,873; Umpires: HP – Ángel Hernández, 1B – Chris Guccione, 2B – Alejandro Pecero, 3B – Tim Meyer; Boxscore

=== Israel vs Dominican Republic ===
March 14, 2023 19:00 PM EDT at LoanDepot Park in Miami, United States
Team	1	2	3	4	5	6	7	8	9	R	H	E
Israel	0	0	0	0	0	0	0	x	x	0	1	1
Dominican Republic	1	0	2	0	0	4	3	x	x	10	15	0
WP: Roansy Contreras (1–0) LP: Jacob Steinmetz (0–1); Home runs: ISR: None; DOM: Manny Machado (2); Attendance: 33,307; Umpires: HP – Mike Estabrook, 1B – Andy Fletcher, 2B – Chris Graham, 3B – Maikol Tibabijo; Boxscore

=== Venezuela vs Israel ===
March 15, 2023 12:00 PM EDT at LoanDepot Park in Miami, United States
Team	1	2	3	4	5	6	7	8	9	R	H	E
Venezuela	3	0	0	1	0	1	0	0	0	5	10	0
Israel	0	0	0	0	0	0	1	0	0	1	9	1
WP: Jesús Luzardo (1–0) LP: Robert Stock (0–1); Home runs: VEN: Eduardo Escobar (1), Eugenio Suárez (1); ISR: None; Attendance: 18,277; Umpires: HP – Andy Fletcher, 1B – Ángel Hernández, 2B – Maikol Tibabijo, 3B – Alejandro Pecero; Boxscore

=== Puerto Rico vs Dominican Republic ===
March 15, 2023 19:00 PM EDT at LoanDepot Park in Miami, United States
Team	1	2	3	4	5	6	7	8	9	R	H	E
Puerto Rico	0	0	4	0	1	0	0	0	0	5	8	0
Dominican Republic	0	0	1	0	1	0	0	0	0	2	6	1
WP: Jovani Morán (1–0) LP: Johnny Cueto (0–1) Sv: Edwin Díaz (1); Home runs: PUR: Christian Vázquez (1); DOM: Juan Soto (2); Attendance: 36,025; Umpires: HP – Chris Guccione, 1B – Ron Kulpa, 2B – Chris Graham, 3B – Tim Meyer; Boxscore

== Statistics ==
=== Leading hitters ===
==== Power ====
SLG	Team	1B	2B	3B	HR	AB
.474	Venezuela	23	9	1	5	135
.442	Dominican Republic	25	10	0	4	138
.423	Puerto Rico	25	8	2	2	130
.264	Nicaragua	17	6	0	1	125
.173	Israel	15	2	0	0	110

==== Efficiency ====
OBP	Team	H	BB	HBP	AB	SF
.370	Venezuela	38	18	1	135	0
.365	Dominican Republic	39	18	0	138	0
.361	Puerto Rico	37	13	3	130	1
.235	Nicaragua	24	7	0	125	0
.231	Israel	17	7	4	110	0

=== Leading pitchers ===
WHIP	Team	BB	H	IP	K
0.94	Puerto Rico	11	22	35	41
0.97	Dominican Republic	9	23	33	36
1.25	Venezuela	12	33	36	46
1.58	Nicaragua	15	37	33	24
1.77	Israel	16	40	31.2	36
