= Dan Iassogna =

American baseball umpire (born 1969)

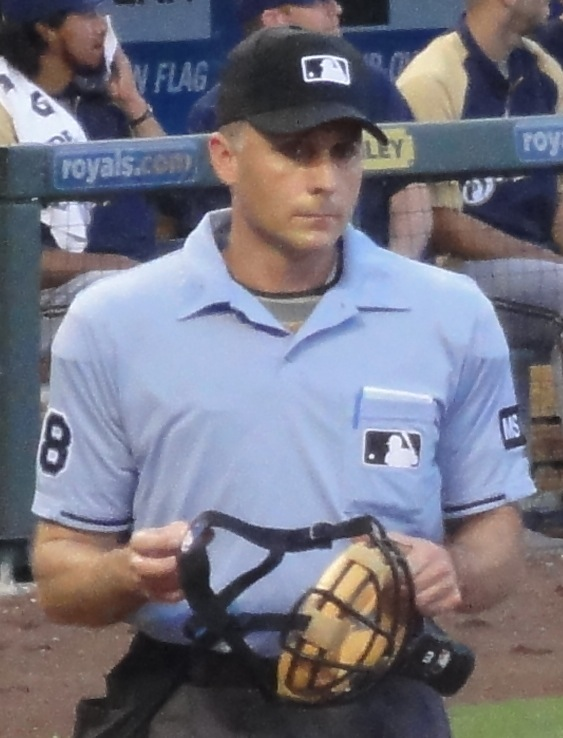
- Iassogna in 2012

MLB – No. 58
- Umpire
- Born: May 3, 1969 (age 57); Atlanta, Georgia, U.S.

MLB debut
- August 20, 1999

Crew information
- Umpiring crew: M
- Crew members: #58 Dan Iassogna (crew chief); #54 C. B. Bucknor; #35 Jeremie Rehak; #38 Adam Beck

Career highlights and awards
- Special assignments: World Series (2012, 2017, 2022); League Championship Series (2010, 2013, 2014, 2015, 2020, 2021, 2023, 2024); Division Series (2005, 2007, 2009, 2011, 2012, 2017, 2022); Wild Card Games/Series (2013, 2014, 2020, 2023, 2024, 2025); All-Star Games (2011, 2025); World Baseball Classic (2009, 2023, 2026)

Daniel Ralph Iassogna (born May 3, 1969) is an American umpire in Major League Baseball. He joined the major league staff in 1999. In 2012, Iassogna worked his first World Series. He was promoted to crew chief for the 2020 season.

== Umpiring career ==
His professional umpiring career began in 1992, and he advanced to the International League in 1998. He umpired his first major league game in 1999, and worked as a fill-in for vacationing or injured major league umpires for the next four seasons. In 2004, Iassogna was promoted to the major leagues to replace the retired Steve Rippley.

He umpired in the postseason in only his second year as a full-time major league umpire, and has worked three World Series (2012, 2017, 2022), eight League Championship Series (2010, 2013, 2014, 2015, 2020, 2021, 2023, 2024) and seven Division Series (2005, 2007, 2009, 2011, 2012, 2017, 2022). Iassogna also worked the 2011 All-Star Game and 2025 All-Star Game and the 2009 World Baseball Classic.

=== Notable games ===
On June 15, 1992, Iassogna was home plate umpire for the Erie Sailors’ home opener against the Jamestown Expos. This New York–Penn League game was the first in the history of the Miami Marlins organization, who had named the Sailors as their first minor league affiliate. The base umpire was Jim Reynolds, who would also later become a full-time MLB umpire.

Iassogna was the third base umpire when Detroit Tigers pitcher Justin Verlander threw a no-hitter at Comerica Park against the Milwaukee Brewers on June 12, 2007. Five days prior to Verlander's no-hitter, Iassogna was also at third base in a game between the Boston Red Sox and the Oakland Athletics in which Boston pitcher Curt Schilling had a no-hitter until Shannon Stewart broke up the no-hitter with a single with two outs in the bottom of the ninth inning.

Iassogna was the second base umpire for Verlander's second no-hitter, thrown on May 7, 2011 against the Toronto Blue Jays.

In game two of the 2012 World Series, Iassogna was the home plate umpire. In the second inning, Delmon Young doubled down the left field line. Prince Fielder, who was attempting to score on the play, was called out at home by Iassogna. Both Fielder and Tigers manager Jim Leyland argued, but video replays showed that the correct call was made.

On May 15, 2016, Iassogna was the home plate umpire when the Toronto Blue Jays visited the Texas Rangers. This game was the final regular season game between the teams that met in the 2015 American League Division Series. Late in the game, a fight broke out between Blue Jays outfielder José Bautista and Rangers second baseman Rougned Odor when Bautista slid late into second base. Iassogna and first base umpire Dale Scott ejected Bautista, Odor, Blue Jays third baseman Josh Donaldson, Rangers bench coach Steve Buechele, Blue Jays pitcher Jesse Chavez, and bench coach/acting manager DeMarlo Hale. Hale was acting as the Blue Jays’ manager due to the ejection of John Gibbons (along with first base coach Tim Leiper) earlier in the game. Odor and Bautista both served suspensions for their actions. There were a total of eight ejections, the most in a single game since 2000.

== Personal life ==
Prior to pursuing umpiring, Iassogna earned a BA in English from the University of Connecticut. While there, he met future colleague Jim Reynolds, who graduated the same year.

Having considered firefighting before becoming an umpire, Iassogna volunteers with the Chicago Fire Department's "Bucks for the Burn Camp," Team Kevin brain tumor research and the New York Fire Department's "Lil Bravest" charities; he also plays the Great Highland Bagpipes. He is married and has two daughters.

== See also ==
- List of Major League Baseball umpires (disambiguation)
