= Miguel Romero (baseball) =

Cuban baseball player (born 1994)

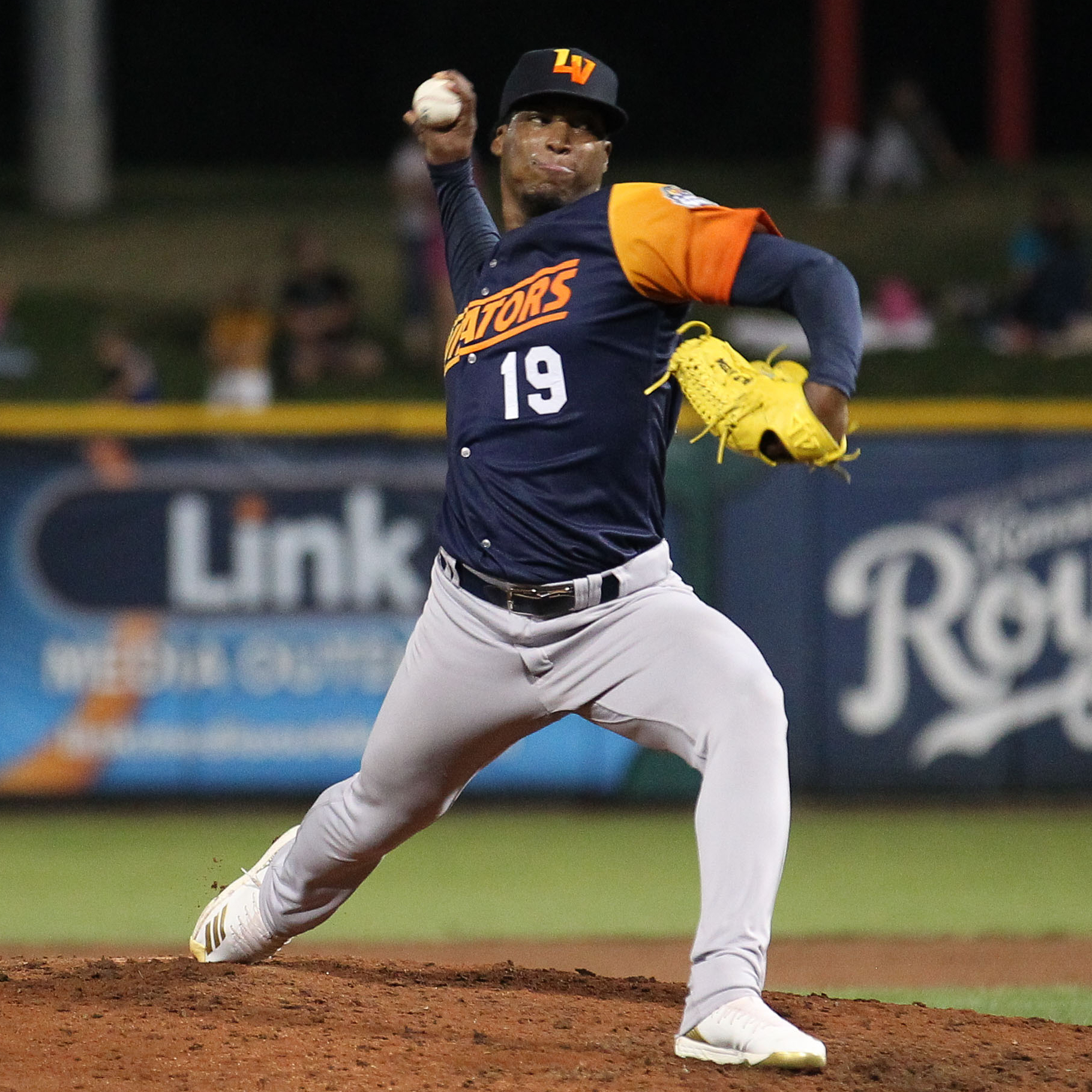
- Romero pitching for the Las Vegas Aviators, Triple-A affiliate of the Oakland Athletics, in 2019

Conspiradores de Querétaro – No. 48
- Pitcher
- Born: April 23, 1994 (age 32); Guantanamo, Cuba
- Bats: Right Throws: Right

Career highlights and awards
- All-World Baseball Classic Team (2023)

Luis Miguel Romero Mansfarroll (born April 23, 1994) is a Cuban professional baseball pitcher for Conspiradores de Querétaro of the Mexican League. He is currently a phantom ballplayer, having spent 13 days on the active roster of the Oakland Athletics without making an appearance.

== Professional career ==
=== Oakland Athletics ===
Romero played for Guantánamo in the Cuban National Series from 2012 to 2016. He signed with the Oakland Athletics as an international free agent on February 1, 2017.

Romero's first affiliated season was split between the rookie-level Arizona League Athletics, the Single-A Beloit Snappers, and the High-A Stockton Ports, where he accumulated a 4.88 ERA in 14 total appearances. In 2018, Romero split the year between Stockton and the Double-A Midland RockHounds, pitching to a 3.94 ERA with 66 strikeouts in 59 1/3 innings pitched across 44 appearances. Romero spent the 2019 season with the Triple-A Las Vegas Aviators, recording a 3.96 ERA with 81 strikeouts across 45 contests. Romero did not play in a game in 2020 due to the cancellation of the minor league season because of the COVID-19 pandemic. The Athletics added him to their 40-man roster on November 20, 2020 to protect him from the Rule 5 draft.

Romero was assigned to Triple-A Las Vegas in 2021, but struggled to a 6.27 ERA in 28 appearances for the team. On September 8, 2021, Romero was promoted to the major leagues for the first time after A. J. Puk was optioned to Triple-A. However, he spent 13 days on the active roster without appearing in a game and was optioned back to Triple-A on September 21 following Michael Feliz's addition to the roster. This earned him the distinction of being a phantom ballplayer, having spent time on the major league team's active roster without having a major league appearance.

On March 27, 2022, it was announced that Romero would be optioned to Triple-A Las Vegas to begin the season. He was designated for assignment by Oakland on April 21. He cleared waivers and was sent outright to Triple-A on April 23. He spent the remainder of the year with the Aviators, struggling to a 7.76 ERA with 32 strikeouts in 53 1/3 innings pitched across 38 appearances.

In 2023, Romero's struggles continued, as he worked to a 6.60 ERA with 12 strikeouts in 15 innings of work across 14 contests. He was released by the Athletics organization on May 23, 2023.

=== Conspiradores de Querétaro ===
On February 19, 2024, Romero signed with the Conspiradores de Querétaro of the Mexican League. In 10 starts, he posted a 2–2 record with a 4.95 ERA and 27 strikeouts over 40 innings pitched. On July 5, Romero was released by the Conspiradores.

=== Charleston Dirty Birds ===
On May 31, 2025, Romero signed with the Charleston Dirty Birds of the Atlantic League of Professional Baseball. In five starts for Charleston, he struggled to an 0-2 record and 6.75 ERA with 23 strikeouts over 24 innings of work. Romero was released by the Dirty Birds on July 4.

=== El Águila de Veracruz ===
On July 7, 2025, Romero signed with El Águila de Veracruz of the Mexican League. In 5 starts he threw 24.1 innings going 1-1 with a 3.33 ERA with more walks (18) than strikeouts (13). He became a free agent following the season.

=== Conspiradores de Querétaro (second stint) ===
On March 15, 2026, Romero was invited to the pre-season by his former team Conspiradores de Querétaro and ended up making the roster.

== International career ==
Romero pitched for Team Cuba in the 2023 World Baseball Classic. In the Classic, he posted a 2.08 ERA and 0.92 WHIP with 13 strikeouts, leading all pitchers in WBC play. Following the tournament, Romero was named to the All-World Baseball Classic Team.
