= World Baseball Classic Championship Trophy =

- Sport: Baseball
- Competition: World Baseball Classic
- Awarded for: Winning the World Baseball Classic
- Local name: Trofeo del CMB (Spanish); Trofeo di WBC (Papiamento); WBC優勝トロフィー (Japanese); 世界棒球經典賽冠軍獎 (Chinese); WBC 우승 트로피 (Korean)
- Presented by: World Baseball Classic Inc. World Baseball Softball Confederation

History
- First award: 2006
- Editions: 6
- First winner: Japan
- Most wins: Japan (3 titles)
- Most recent: Venezuela (1st title)
- Website: world-baseball-classic/trophy-tour

The World Baseball Classic Championship Trophy is the trophy presented by Major League Baseball (MLB) and the Major League Baseball Players Association (MLBPA) (through World Baseball Classic Inc.) to the winning team of the World Baseball Classic (WBC). The winning team of each WBC is rewarded a large silver trophy as its primary recognition.

== Design ==
The trophy was produced by Tiffany & Co. craftsmen over 200 hours. It is originally made of sterling silver (with gold details added over time) by Tiffany & Co., a long-established silvery shop.

Height: 25 inches (64 cm)

Weight: 30 pounds (14 kg)

Material: Sterling silver and 24-karat gold.

The design motif is "Global Baseball" with the WBC logo and consists of a pedestal, four boards, and balls. The pedestal cut into four tiers represents the tournament in the fourth round (first round, second round, semi-finals, and final), and the four sloping boards extending upward from the pedestal and the feather-shaped boards facing the upper center represent the four pools in the first round. Also, the central baseball, supported by four boards, symbolizes the earth.

== By team ==
Team	Trophies	Years
Japan	3	2006, 2009, 2023
Dominican Republic	1	2013
United States	1	2017
Venezuela	1	2026

== See also ==
- Commissioner's Trophy (MLB)
