= Frederic Cumenal =

French entrepreneur

- Born: Frederic Patrick Cumenal; September 1959 (age 66)
- Occupation: businessman
- Known for: former CEO, Tiffany & Co.

Frederic Patrick Cumenal (born September 1959) is a French businessman, and was the chairman and CEO of Tiffany & Co., the American jewelry retailer, from April 2015 to February 2017.

Michael J. Kowalski retired as CEO on 31 March 2015, and remained non-executive chairman. Cumenal, president of Tiffany, succeed him as CEO.

Following weak sales Tiffany announced in February 2017 that Cumenal was leaving immediately, after 22 months as CEO. He was replaced on an interim basis by his predecessor Michael Kowalski.
