= Tiffany & Co. =

American luxury jewelry and specialty design house

Coordinates: 40.7626°N 73.9738°W

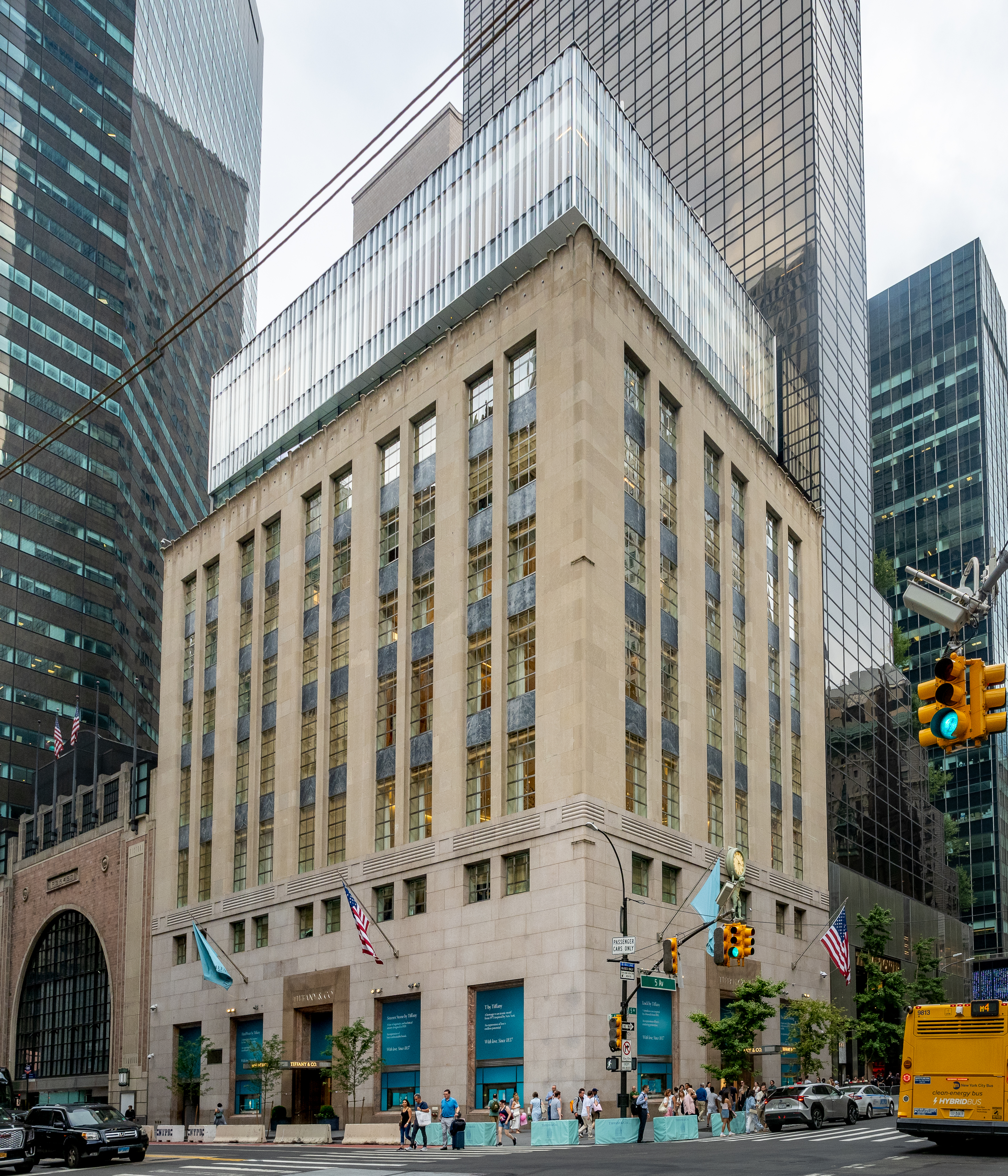
- Tiffany's flagship store on Fifth Avenue in 2024
- Formerly: Tiffany, Young and Ellis (1837–1853)
- Type: Subsidiary
- Traded as: NYSE: TIF (1987–2021) S&P 100 component (until 2021) S&P 500 component (until 2021)
- Industry: Retail
- Founded: September 18, 1837; 189 years ago in Brooklyn, New York City, U.S.
- Founders: Charles Lewis Tiffany; John B. Young
- Headquarters: 200 Fifth Avenue, New York City, U.S.
- Number of locations: 326 stores (2020)
- Area served: Worldwide
- Key people: Nathalie Verdeille (SVP - Chief Artistic Officer); Anthony Ledru (President and CEO); Michael Burke (Chairman)
- Products: Jewelry; porcelain; crystal; stationery; fragrances; watches; accessories; leather goods
- Revenue: ▼US$4.42 billion (2020)
- Operating income: ▼US$733 million (2020)
- Net income: ▼US$541 million (2020)
- Total assets: ▲US$6.66 billion (2020)
- Total equity: ▲US$3.32 billion (2020)
- Number of employees: 14,100 (2020)
- Parent: LVMH (2021–present)
- Website: www.tiffany.com

Tiffany & Co. (colloquially known as Tiffany's) is an American luxury jewelry and specialty design house owned by the French conglomerate LVMH, and headquartered on Fifth Avenue in Manhattan. Tiffany is known for its luxury goods, particularly its sterling silver and diamond jewelry. These goods are sold at Tiffany stores, online, and through corporate merchandising. Its name and branding are licensed to Coty for fragrances and to the Franco-Italian company EssilorLuxottica for eyewear.

Tiffany & Co. was founded in 1837 by the jeweler Charles Lewis Tiffany and became famous in the early 20th century under the artistic direction of his son Louis Comfort Tiffany. In 2018, net sales totaled US$4.44 billion. As of 2023, Tiffany operated over 300 stores globally, in many countries including the United States, Japan, and Canada, as well as Europe, Latin America, and the collective Asia-Pacific region, and is exploring opportunities in Africa. The company's product line features fine jewelry, sterling silver, watches, porcelain, crystal, stationery, haute couture fragrance and personal accessories, and leather goods.

On January 7, 2021, French conglomerate LVMH acquired a majority stake in Tiffany & Co. for US$15.8 billion and delisted Tiffany's stock from the New York Stock Exchange. It remains headquartered in New York City.

== History ==
=== Establishment ===
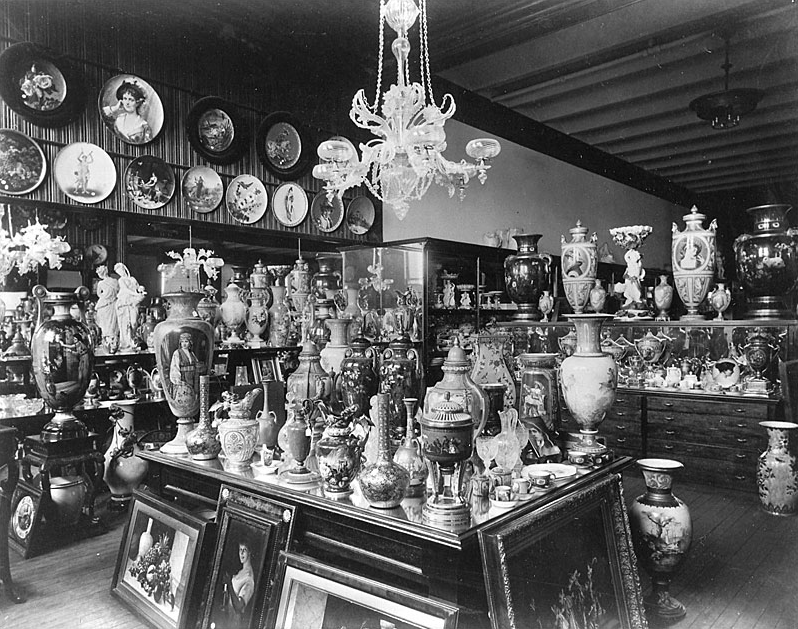
Tiffany & Company, Union Square, Manhattan, storage area with porcelain, c. 1887

"Tiffany, Young and Ellis" was founded in 1837 by Charles Lewis Tiffany and John B. Young, in New York City, as a "stationery and fancy goods emporium", with the help of Charles Tiffany's father, who financed the store for only $1,000 with profits from a cotton mill. The store initially sold a wide variety of stationery items and, as of 1837, operated as "Tiffany, Young and Ellis" at 259 Broadway in Lower Manhattan.

The business name was shortened to Tiffany & Company in 1853, when Charles Tiffany took control and established the firm's emphasis on jewelry. The company has since opened stores in major cities worldwide. Unlike other stores at the time in the 1830s, Tiffany marked the prices on its goods to prevent any haggling over prices. In addition, though atypical for the time, Tiffany only accepted cash payments and did not allow purchases on credit. Such practices (fixed prices for ready money) had first been introduced in 1750 by Palmer's of London Bridge.

=== "Blue Book" and the Civil War ===
The first Tiffany mail order catalog, known as the "Blue Book", was published in 1845 in the United States (U.S.), and publishing of the catalog continues in the 21st century. In 1862, Tiffany supplied the Union Army with swords (Model 1840 Cavalry Saber), flags and surgical implements. In 1867, Tiffany was the first U.S. firm to win an award for excellence in silverware at the Exposition Universelle in Paris. In 1868, Tiffany was incorporated.

=== "Gilded Age" ===
In 1870, the company built a new store building at 15 Union Square West, Manhattan, which was designed by John Kellum and cost US$500,000. It was described by The New York Times as a "palace of jewels." Tiffany stayed at this site until 1906.

In 1877, an insignia that would become the New York Yankees "NY" logo was struck on a police medal of honor by Tiffany; the Yankees adopted the logo in 1909. In 1878, Tiffany won the gold medal for jewelry and a grand prize for silverware at the Paris Exposition. In 1879, Tiffany purchased one of the world's largest yellow diamonds which became known as the Tiffany Diamond. The Tiffany Diamond has only been worn by four people, one of whom was Audrey Hepburn for the promotion of Breakfast at Tiffany's. In 1887, Tiffany bought a number of pieces at the auction of part of the French Crown Jewels, which attracted publicity and further solidified the Tiffany brand's association with high-quality diamonds. In 1885 the company revised the Great Seal of the United States.

=== 20th century ===
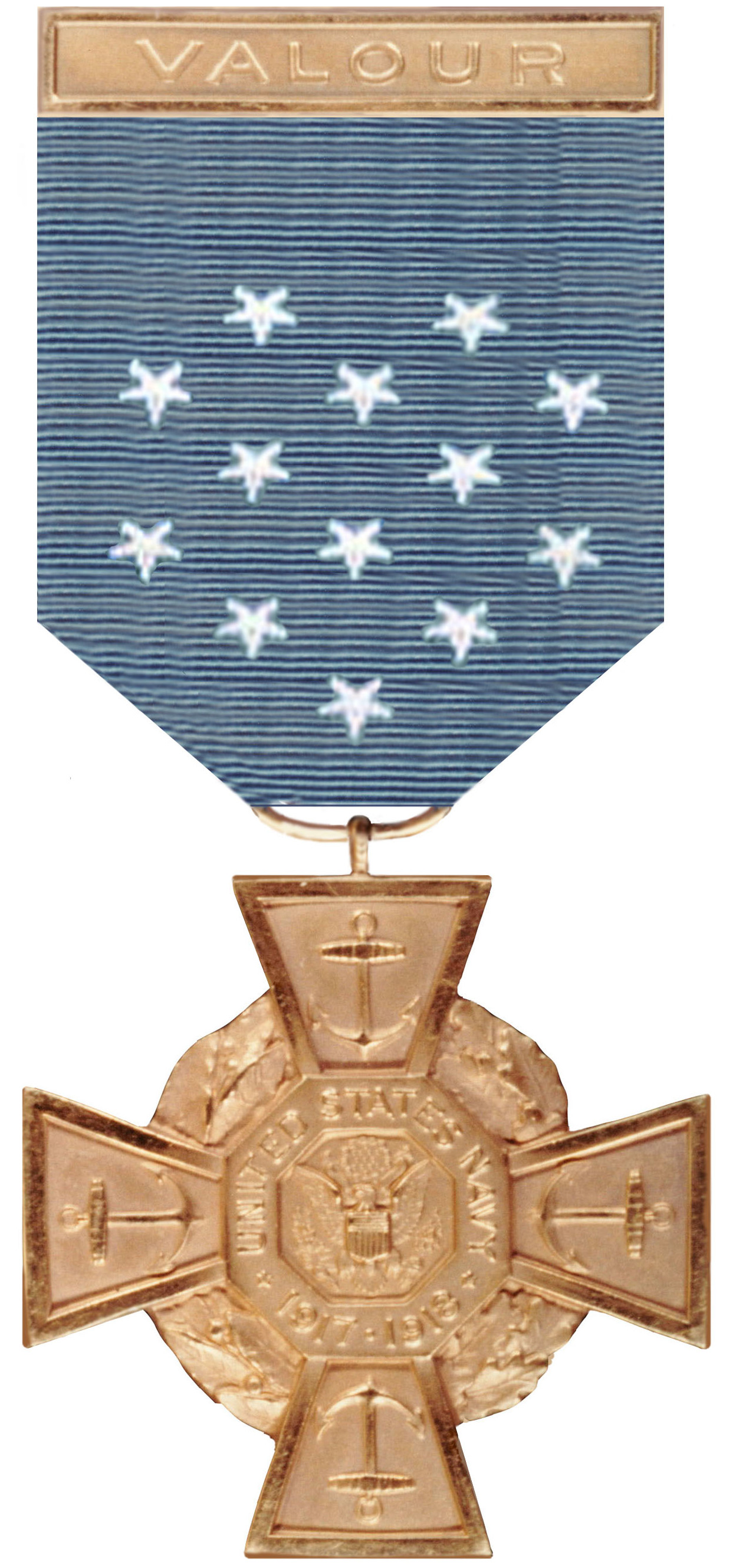
"Tiffany Cross" version of the Medal of Honor

In 1902, after the death of Charles Lewis Tiffany, his son, Louis Comfort Tiffany, became the company's first official design director.

Known for his innovations in stained glass, Louis Comfort Tiffany also made significant contributions to Art Nouveau jewelry. His work with iridescent glass, opals, and enamel introduced new techniques in jewelry design by blending organic forms with vibrant colors. Tiffany’s use of glass, enamel, and opals became a hallmark of his style, and was credited with growing the company's reputation during this period.

In 1905, the Manhattan flagship store was relocated to the corner of 37th Street and Fifth Avenue, where it would remain for 35 years.

In 1919, the company made a revision to the Medal of Honor on behalf of the United States Department of the Navy. This "Tiffany Cross" version was rare because it was awarded only for combat, using the previous design for non-combat awards. In 1942, the Navy established the Tiffany version for non-combat heroism as well but, in August 1942, the Navy subsequently eliminated the Tiffany Cross and the two-medal system.

The company moved its flagship store to its present-day 727 Fifth Avenue building in 1940; the building was designed by Cross & Cross. In 1956, legendary designer Jean Schlumberger joined Tiffany, and Andy Warhol collaborated with the company to create Tiffany holiday cards (circa 1956–1962). Schlumberger's designs, such as the Bird on a Rock brooch, became synonymous with the company's post-war jewelry innovations. In 1968, Lady Bird Johnson, First Lady of the U.S. at the time, commissioned Tiffany to design a White House china-service that featured 90 flowers.

In November 1978, Tiffany & Co. was sold to Avon Products for about US$104 million in stock. However, in a 1984 Newsweek article, the Fifth Avenue Tiffany store was likened to the Macy's department store during a white sale, due to the high number of inexpensive items on sale; furthermore, customers complained about declining quality and service. In August 1984, Avon sold Tiffany to an investor group led by William R. Chaney for $135.5 million in cash. Tiffany went public again in 1987 and raised about $103.5 million from the sale of 4.5 million shares of common stock.

Due to the 1990–1991 recession in the United States, Tiffany emphasized mass merchandising. A new campaign was launched that advertised how Tiffany could be affordable for all. One such example is that the company advertised the price of diamond engagement rings started at $850, and "How to Buy a Diamond" brochures were sent to 40,000 people, who called a toll-free number specifically set up to target the broader population. However, to maintain its image as a luxury goods company, high-style images remained on display in Tiffany stores.

On September 4, 1994, a jewelry heist occurred at the store in New York City, in which six men stole $1.9 million of jewelry. During the incident, no shots were fired and no vandalism occurred. Two weeks after the robbery, the six men were arrested and the jewelry was recovered.

Tiffany & Co. trademarked their signature Tiffany Blue color in 1998. Three years later they partnered with Pantone to standardize the color as "1837 Blue".

=== 2000s ===
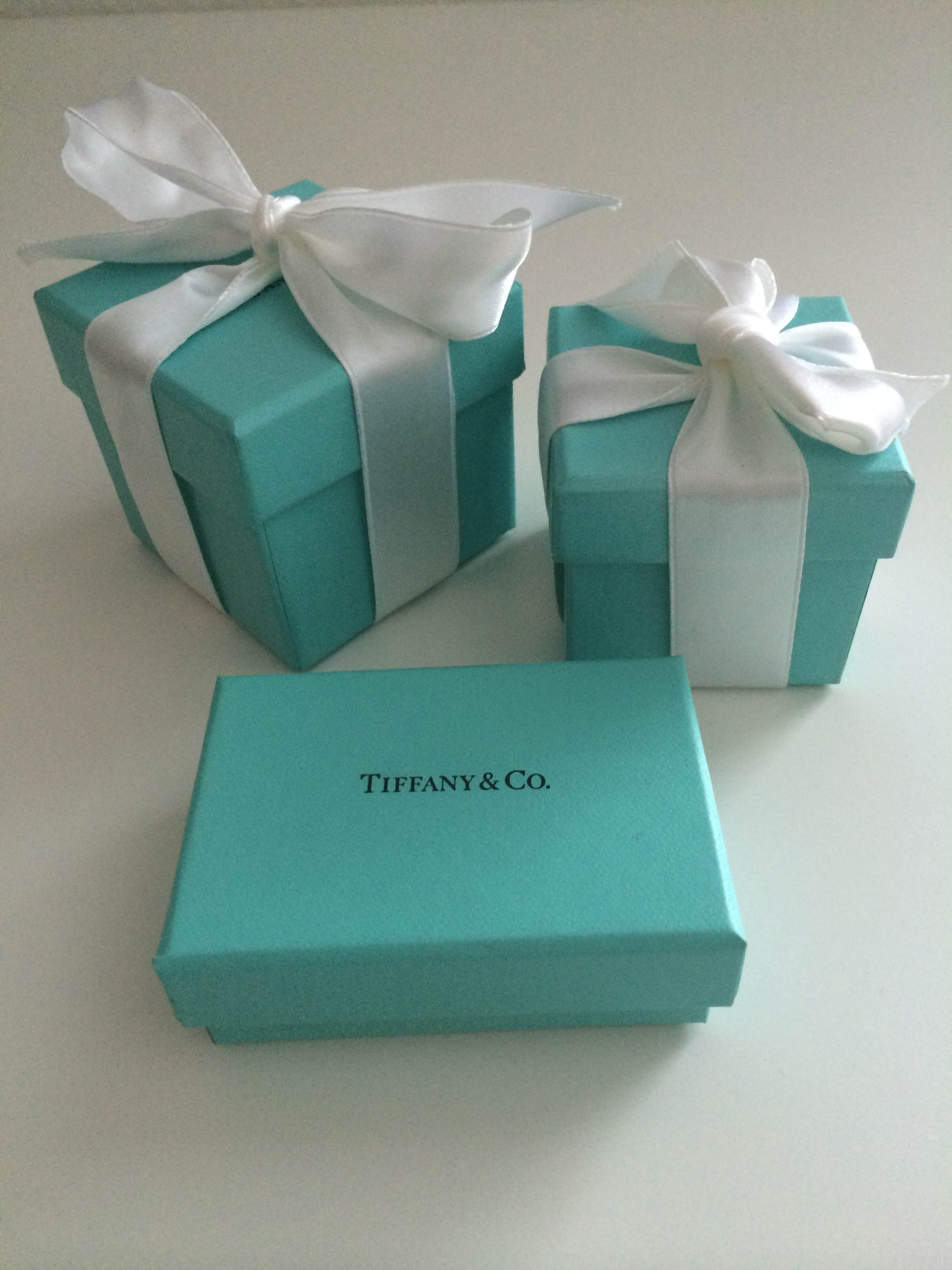
Tiffany & Co. blue gift boxes

The Tiffany & Co. Foundation was established in 2000 to provide grants to nonprofit organizations working in the areas of the environment and the arts. In June 2004, Tiffany sued eBay, claiming that the latter was making profits from the sale of counterfeit Tiffany products; however, Tiffany lost both at trial and on appeal.

Tiffany & Co. established their subsidiary Laurelton Diamonds in 2002 to manage Tiffany's worldwide diamond supply chain.

In 2009, a collaboration between the Japanese mobile-phone operator SoftBank and Tiffany & Co. was announced. The two companies designed a cellphone, limited to ten copies, and containing more than 400 diamonds, totaling more than 20 carats (4.0 g). Each cellphone cost more than 100 million yen ($672,687).

Also in 2009, the company launched their Tiffany Keys collection.

=== 2010s and 2020s ===
In early July 2013, former Tiffany & Co. vice president Ingrid Lederhaas-Okun was arrested and charged with stealing and re-selling more than $1.3 million of diamond bracelets, drop earrings, and other jewelry. Lederhaas-Okun pleaded guilty to theft and was sentenced to one year in federal prison.

The company's Francesca Amfitheatrof-designed Tiffany T collection debuted in 2014.

In February 2017, the company announced that CEO Frédéric Cuménal was fired, after only 22 months, blaming weak sales results. He was replaced on an interim basis by the company's longtime former CEO, Michael Kowalski. Shortly before his departure, Cuménal had appointed former Coach designer Reed Krakoff as the company's new chief artistic officer. Although Krakoff had no previous experience with jewellery design, his previous success with Coach and "deep understanding of iconic American design" led to his appointment, with the hopes that Krakoff would be able to refresh the image of the brand.

In April 2017, the company launched their Tiffany HardWear collection.

In July 2017, it was announced that Bulgari veteran Alessandro Bogliolo would be taking over as CEO. Under his leadership, it was hoped that Tiffany & Co. could turn around slumping sales and capture a younger audience.

Tiffany & Co. opened the Blue Box Cafe in New York City in November 2017. Also in November 2017, the company launched their Home & Accessories line.

In March 2018, the company opened the Jewelry Design and Innovation Workshop, a new 17,000-square-foot atelier.

In May 2018, Tiffany launched their Paper Flowers Collection, designed by Reed Krakoff.

In September 2018, Tiffany launched their Paper Flowers collection in Asia. That same month, the company debuted a new proprietary engagement ring design called the Tiffany True.

In August 2019, Tiffany launched their first men's jewelry collection in October of the same year. The line was developed by Reed Krakoff.

In October 2019, Tiffany opened a new brand exhibition in Shanghai, China called "Vision & Virtuosity".

Tiffany opened its first store in New Delhi, India on 3 February 2020.

After the start of Russia's full-scale invasion of Ukraine, the brand announced that it was stopping purchasing diamonds from Russia. However, it was later revealed that they continued to purchase through intermediaries, including the UAE.

==== Acquisition by LVMH ====
In November 2019, LVMH announced its purchase of Tiffany & Co for $16.2 billion, $135 per share. LVMH cancelled the pending purchase in September 2020, with Tiffany filing a lawsuit asking the court to compel the purchase or to assess damages against LVMH. The same month, Forbes reported that LVMH had cancelled the deal because Tiffany was paying millions in dividends to shareholders despite financial losses during the COVID-19 pandemic. Some US$70 million had already been paid by Tiffany, with an additional US$70 million to be paid in November 2020. LVMH filed a counterclaim against Tiffany for its mismanagement during the pandemic.

The case was set aside after LVMH agreed to purchase Tiffany at a reduced price of almost $16 billion in October 2020. The $15.8 billion deal was approved by shareholders in December 2020. Tiffany was delisted from the New York Stock Exchange when the deal closed in January 2021. After LVMH's acquisition, several of Tiffany's senior leaders were replaced with executives from other sectors of LVMH. Michael Burke is appointed as the Chairman of the Board of Directors. Alexandre Arnault was given the role of executive vice president.

Tiffany and Co. appointed Nathalie Verdeille as the Senior Vice President - Chief Artistic Officer in 2026 to oversee the products of high-jewelry, watches and home & accessories.

== Stores ==
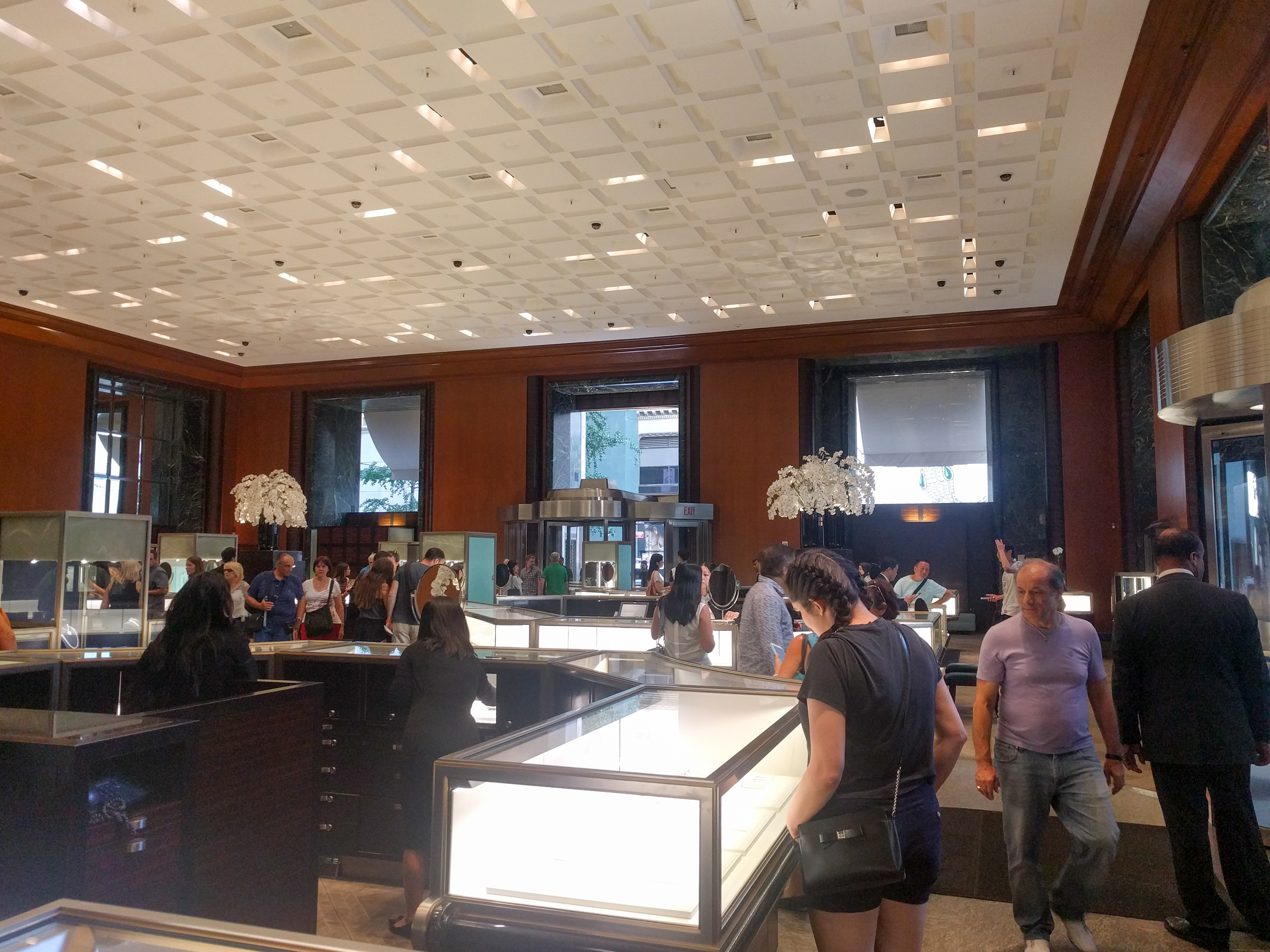
Tiffany's flagship store, interior

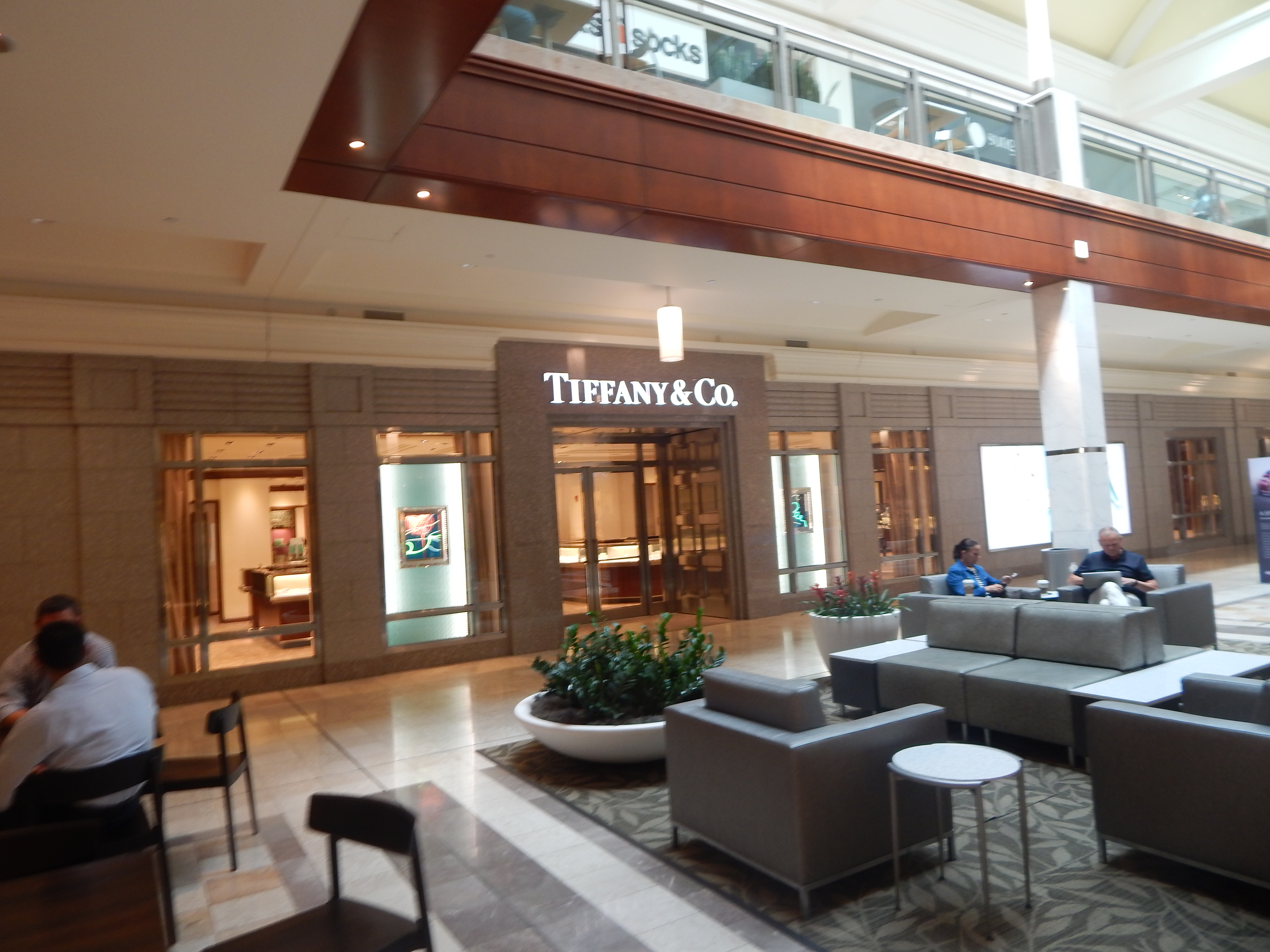
Tiffany & Co. at Phipps Plaza in Atlanta, Georgia

Since 1940, Tiffany's flagship store has operated at the corner of Fifth Avenue and 57th Street in Manhattan, New York City. The store has been the location for a number of films, including Breakfast at Tiffany's, starring Audrey Hepburn, and Sweet Home Alabama, starring Reese Witherspoon. Beginning in 2019, the store underwent an extensive renovation, concluding in 2023 and reopening to the public on April 27. The project was designed by American architect Peter Marino.

The former Tiffany and Company Building on 37th Street is on the U.S. National Register of Historic Places.

When it opened in 1990, the Tiffany & Co. store at Fairfax Square in Tysons Corner, Virginia, became the largest store outside of New York City, with 14,500 sq ft (1,350 m^{2}) of retail space.

In France, notable Tiffany stores are located in Rue de la Paix and the Avenue des Champs Elysées (the largest European store) in Paris.

In Australia, Tiffany's flagship store is located on Collins Street in Melbourne, first established in 1996. Tiffany has since opened a further eight stores in Australia, located in Melbourne, Sydney, Brisbane, Perth, Adelaide and the Gold Coast.

On March 8, 2001, Tiffany launched its first Latin American store in São Paulo, Brazil, located in the Iguatemi São Paulo shopping center. The company opened a second store in the city on October 20, 2003, near the famous Oscar Freire Street.

In 2004, Tiffany created "Iridesse", a chain of stores dedicated to pearl-only jewelry. The company operated 16 stores in Florida, New Jersey, New York, Pennsylvania, California, Illinois, Massachusetts, and Virginia. However, the chain operated at a loss since its founding and the company announced in early 2009 that, despite its continued belief in the concept, it would discontinue Iridesse due to the Great Recession.

As of 2018, Tiffany operated 93 stores in the US and 321 stores worldwide, including (as of 31 January 2017) 55 locations in Japan and 85 in the Asia-Pacific region. Net sales in 2018 totaled US$4.44 billion.

In April 2024, Tiffany & Co. opened their newest store at QueensPlaza in Brisbane.

== Advertising ==
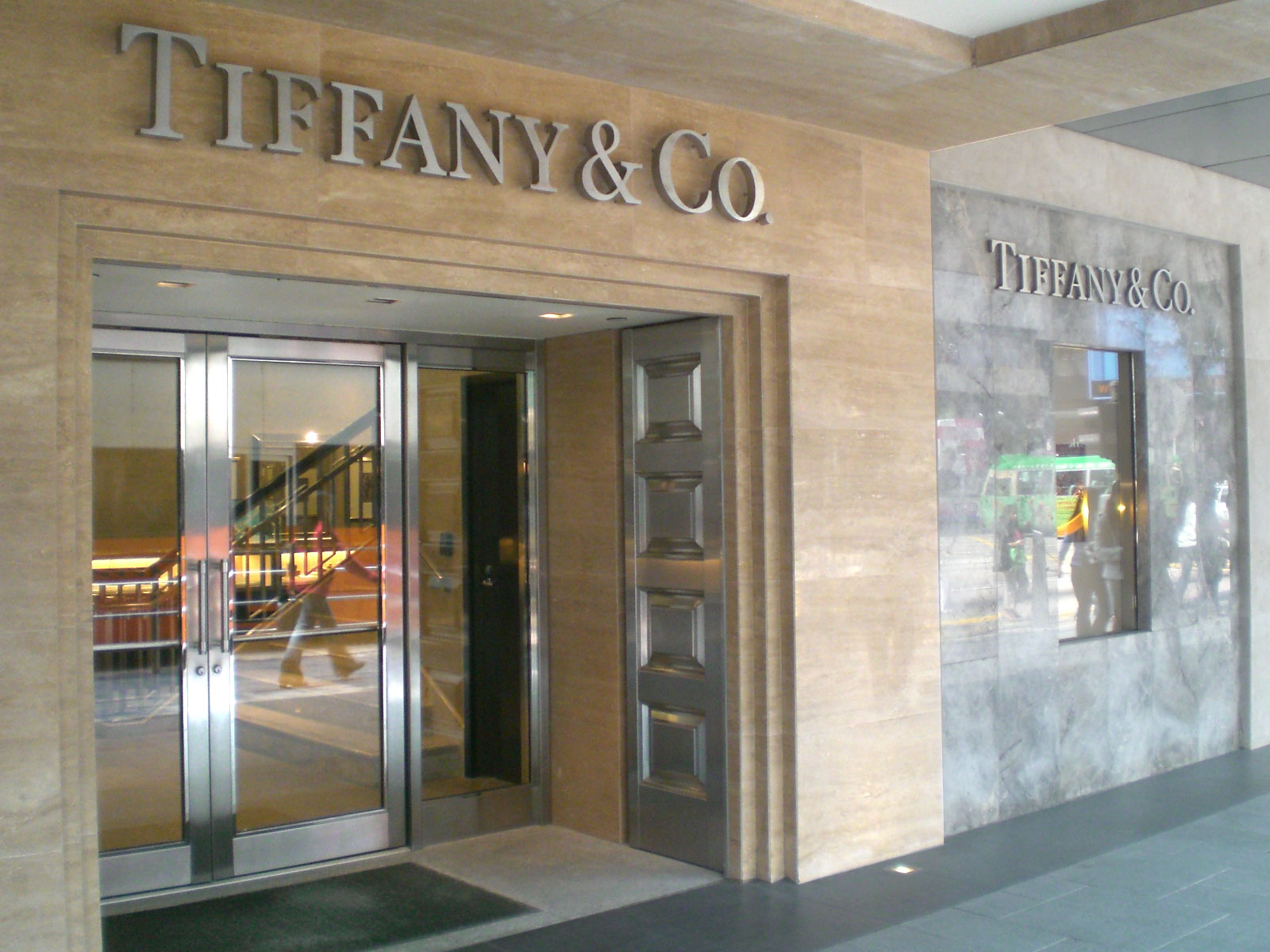
Tiffany & Co. at Central, Hong Kong

After the initial publication of the "Blue Book" Tiffany catalog in 1845, Tiffany continued to use its catalog as part of its advertisement strategy. The Tiffany catalog, one of the first catalogs printed in full color, remained free until 1972. The Blue Book has been described as the first direct-mail luxury catalog in the United States. Tiffany's mail-order catalogs reached 15 million people in 1994. Tiffany also produces a corporate-gift catalog each year. As of 2013 Tiffany still produces a catalog for subscribers, but its advertisement strategy no longer focuses primarily on its catalog.

In addition to the mail-order catalog, Tiffany displays its advertisements in many locations, including at bus stops, in magazines and newspapers, and online. In January 2015, Tiffany launched its first ever same-sex couple campaign.

In 2017, Tiffany partnered with American pop star Lady Gaga for an ad campaign promoting the company's HardWear collection. The announcement came as a Super Bowl ad prior to Lady Gaga's Super Bowl LI halftime show performance.

In May 2018, Tiffany partnered with Spotify for the launch of Tiffany's "Believe in Dreams" campaign and Paper Flowers collection, releasing a cover of the song "Moon River" by Elle Fanning and rapper A$AP Ferg on the music streaming service.

In 2019, Tiffany partnered with American celebrity Kendall Jenner to promote the company's spring fashion line.

In 2021, Tiffany partnered with American singer Beyoncé and rapper Jay-Z to promote the company's "About Love" campaign. Beyoncé became the fourth woman, and first Black woman, to wear the Tiffany Yellow Diamond. The campaign incorporated Tiffany's recently acquired robin egg blue painting, Equals Pi (1982), by American artist Jean-Michel Basquiat.

In 2022, Tiffany partnered with Curtis Kulig while retaining his original "Love Me" concept, Kulig also created other love-themed messages such as: "Dare Me," "Know Me," and "Kiss Me" to be displayed alongside the Tiffany HardWear, Tiffany Knot and Tiffany T collections.

In 2023, actress Anya Taylor-Joy became the face of Tiffany's fine jewelry campaign. She features prominently in the 2023 Blue Book collection.

Actress Natalie Portman becomes the new house ambassador of Tiffany & Co., particularly featured in the campaign named "With Love, Since 1837" in March 2026.

== Products ==
=== Diamonds ===
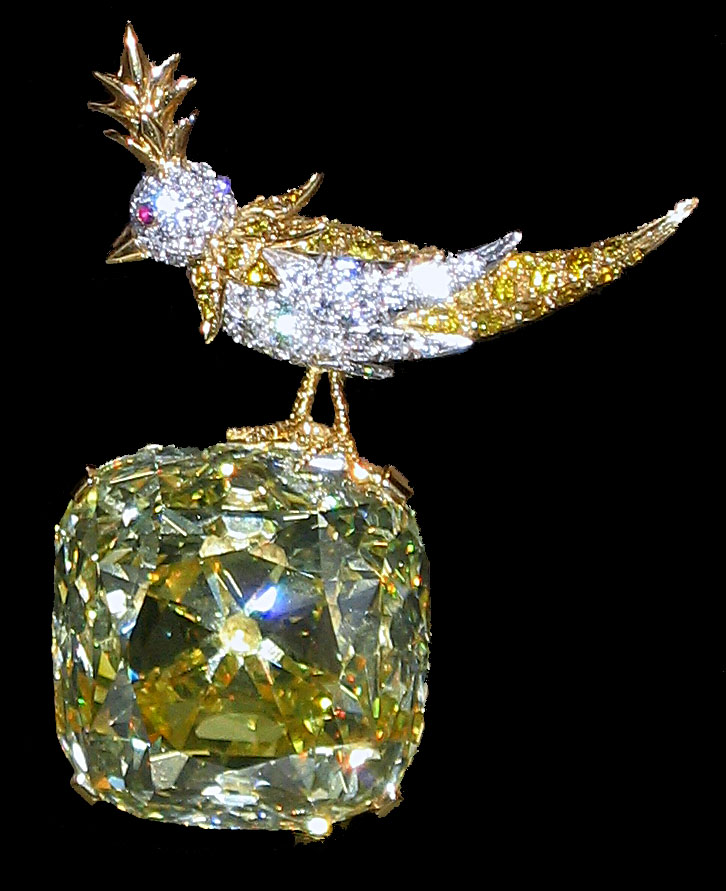
The Tiffany Yellow Diamond

Tiffany is known for its luxury goods, particularly its diamond and sterling silver jewelry.

George Frederick Kunz (1856–1932), a Tiffany gemologist, became instrumental in the international adoption of the metric carat as a weight standard for gems. The Tiffany Yellow Diamond (128.54 carats (25.708 g)) is usually on display in the New York City flagship store.

In 1886, founder Charles Tiffany conceived of the Tiffany Setting ring design, in which six prongs hold the diamond off of the band, in order to better accentuate the diamond.

Like other similar diamond retailers, Tiffany enacts a strict policy against the repurchasing of diamonds sold from its stores. In 1978, a woman in New York City was denied after she attempted to sell back a diamond ring she had bought from Tiffany two years earlier for $100,000.

In 2019, Tiffany CEO Alessandro Bogliolo announced that in 2020 the company would become transparent regarding the country or region of origin of the company's newly sourced and individually registered diamonds.

=== Colored gemstones ===
Tiffany offers jewelry incorporating a wide variety of colored gemstones, including gems it played a role in popularizing, such as tsavorite, kunzite, and morganite. In February 2015 a turquoise and aquamarine bib designed by Francesca Amfitheatrof, Tiffany's design director, and worn by Cate Blanchett at the 2015 Academy Awards, contrasted favorably with the white–diamond encrusted jewelry worn by other stars, according to Guy Trebay of the New York Times. In 2025, Tiffany & Co. announced the acquisition of a 7,500-carat rough kunzite gemstone, intended as the centerpiece of a special capsule collection celebrating the 60th anniversary of its iconic Bird on a Rock brooch design. The gemstone, notable for its size—approximately that of a paperback book—clarity, and vivid purplish-pink color, was originally discovered in Mozambique over 25 years ago and purchased earlier that year from a gemstone dealer in Bangkok.

=== Fragrances ===
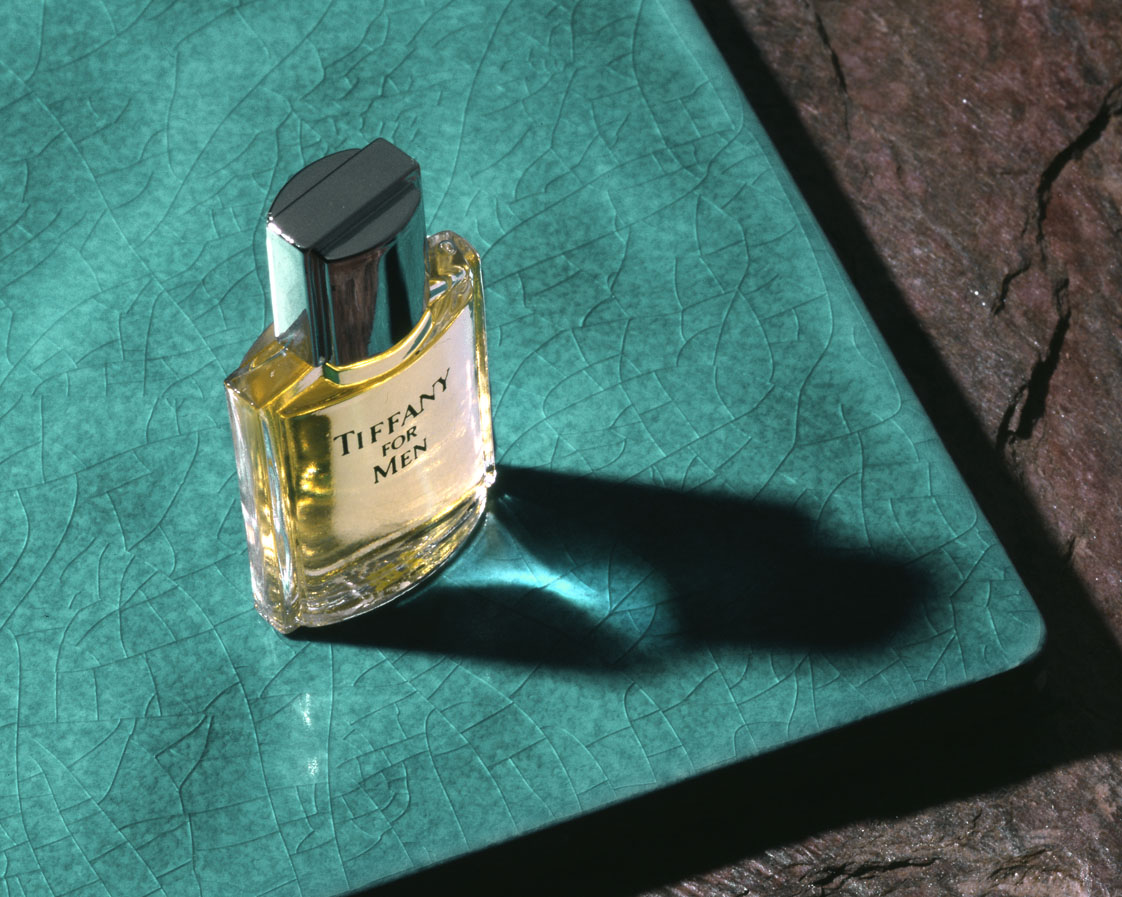
Original 1989 sample bottle of "Tiffany for Men" fragrance

In the late 1980s, Tiffany & Co. ventured into the fragrance business. "Tiffany" for women was launched in 1987, a floral perfume for women by perfumer François Demachy. At $220 per ounce, "Tiffany" was marketed by major department stores across the United States. Two years later, "Tiffany for Men" was launched in 1989 and developed by perfumer Jacques Polge. The bottles for both the men's and women's fragrance were designed by Pierre Dinand. In 1995, Tiffany launched "Trueste" perfume for women, which was later discontinued.

In October 2019, Tiffany launched a new fragrance line, Tiffany & Love.

== Sports awards ==
Tiffany & Co is the maker of the Vince Lombardi Trophy, made for the winner of the NFL team that wins the Super Bowl that year.

Since 1977, Tiffany & Co. has manufactured Larry O' Brien Trophy, the trophy that is given to the winner of the NBA Finals.

Tiffany makes and designes the World Baseball Classic Trophy, and Commissioner's Trophy each year, given to the winner of the World Series. Tiffany & Co made the 2010 and 2012 World Series rings for the San Francisco Giants.

Since 1987, Tiffany silversmiths have crafted the US Open trophies for the United States Tennis Association.

Tiffany & Co. makes the PGA Tour FedEx Cup Trophy each year since 2007.

The MLS championship trophy was made by Tiffany & Co.

A £10,000 Rugby League World Cup trophy was made by Tiffany's to celebrate the centenary of Rugby league.

In 2021, Tiffany & Co. joined the LCK sponsorship team after noticing the league's rapid growth. Tiffany & Co. would award championship rings to the winners of the LCK finals for the next three years beginning with the Summer Split of 2021. In LPL, a trophy was designed by Tiffany and Co. for the new Silver Dragon Cup to commemorate LoL's tenth anniversary in China.

From the 2022 League of Legends World Championship onwards, Tiffany & Co. are the official makers of the newly redesigned Summoner's Cup, which was first awarded to DRX after their 3-2 victory over T1.

Since 2023, Tiffany & Co. has manufactured the NBA Cup and Cup MVP trophies, awarded to the winning team and most valuable player of the NBA's annual In-Season Tournament.

== In popular culture ==
The retailer has been mentioned in various works, most notably in the title of the 1958 Truman Capote novella Breakfast at Tiffany's, adapted as the 1961 film starring Audrey Hepburn.

== Gallery ==
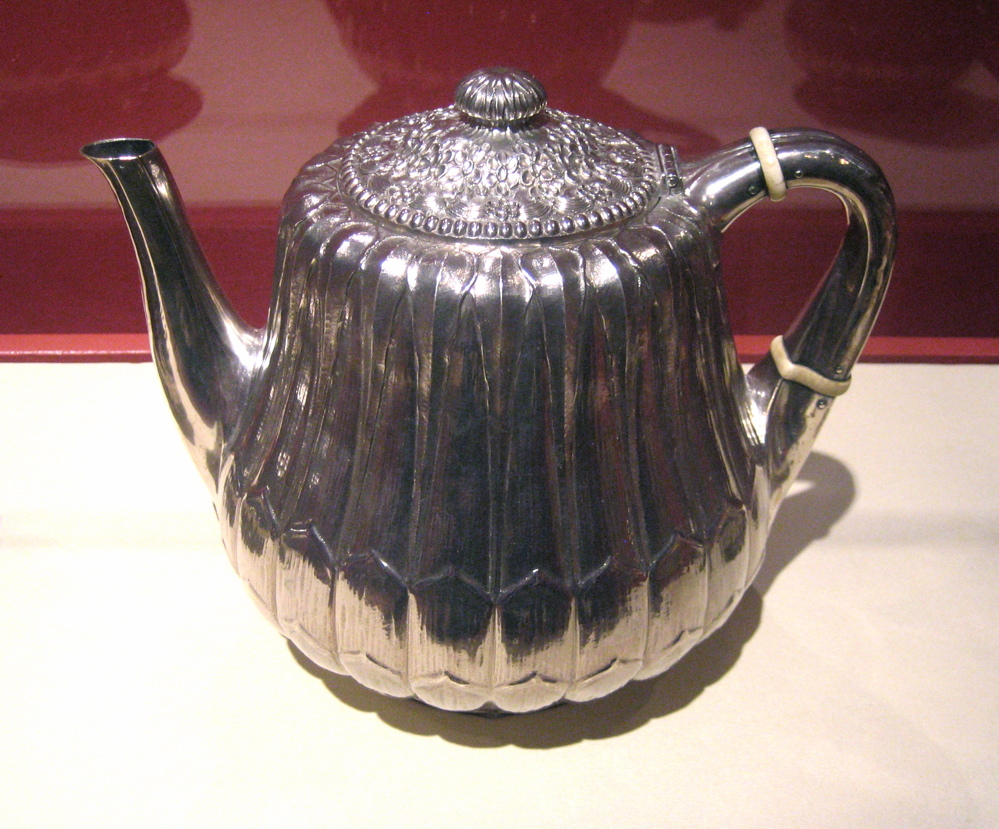
Silver tea pot

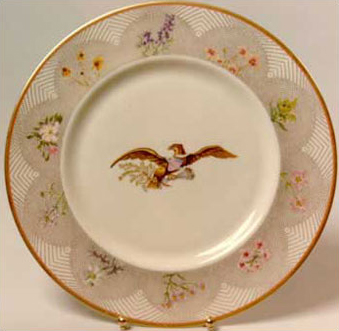
White House china service for Lady Bird Johnson

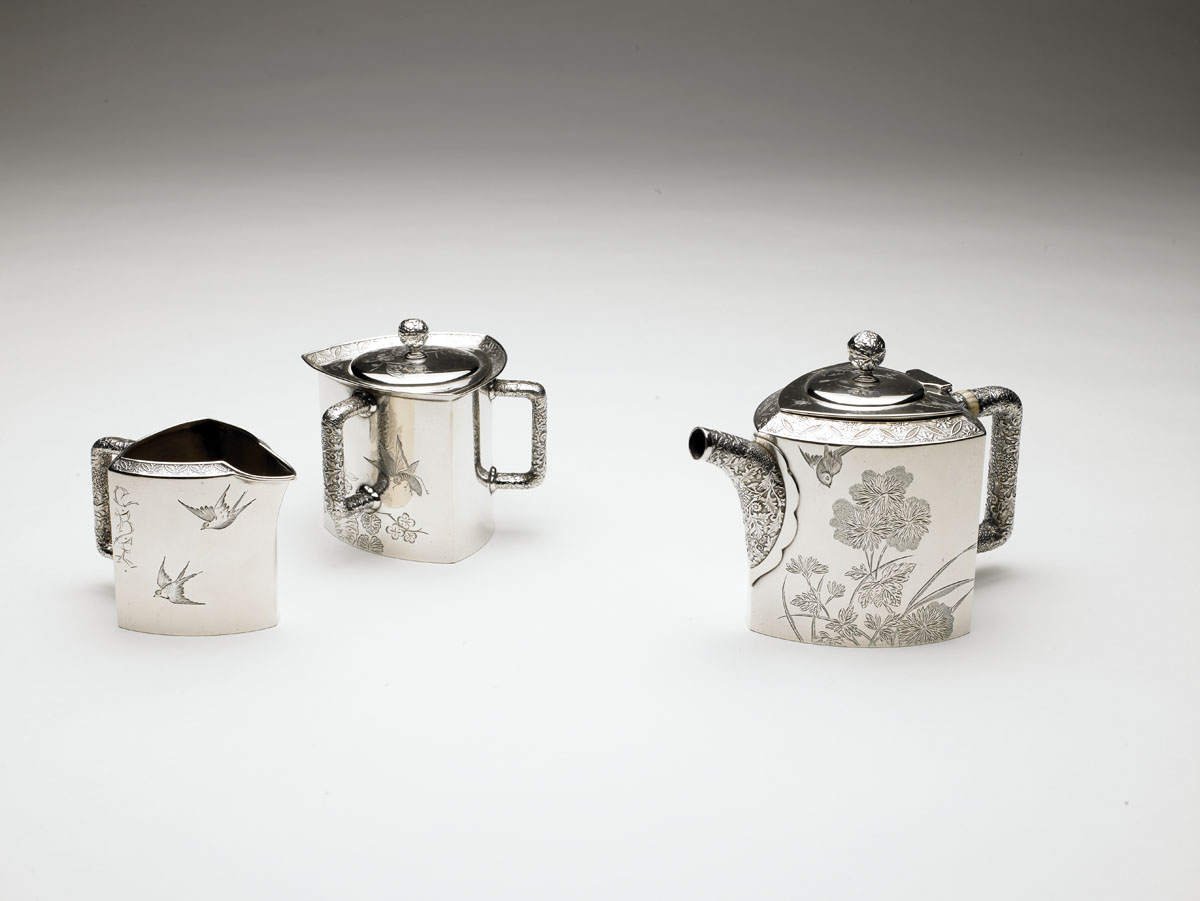
Tea set, c. 1877, held at the Birmingham Museum of Art

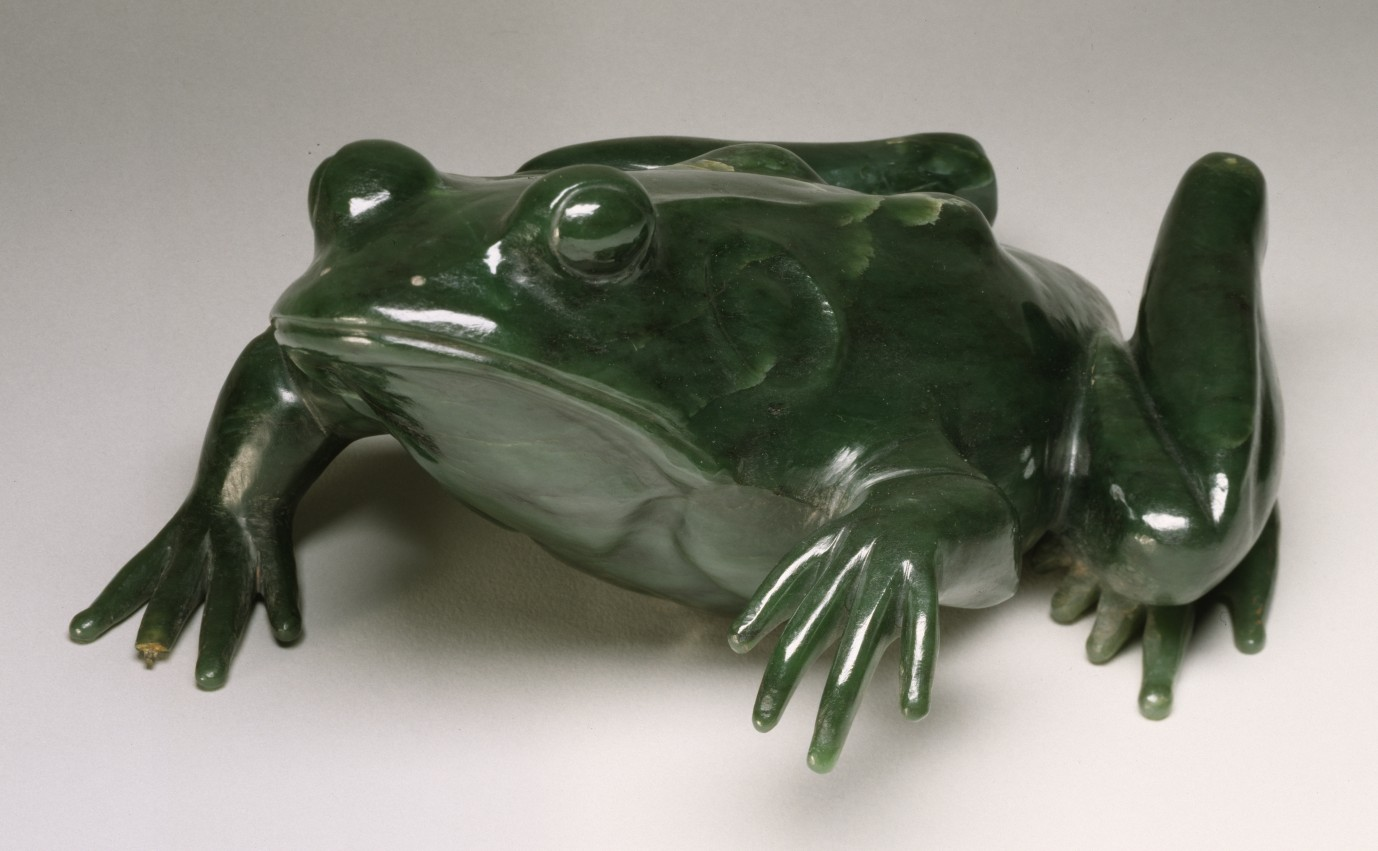
Carved frog for display at the Exposition Universelle (1900) in Paris

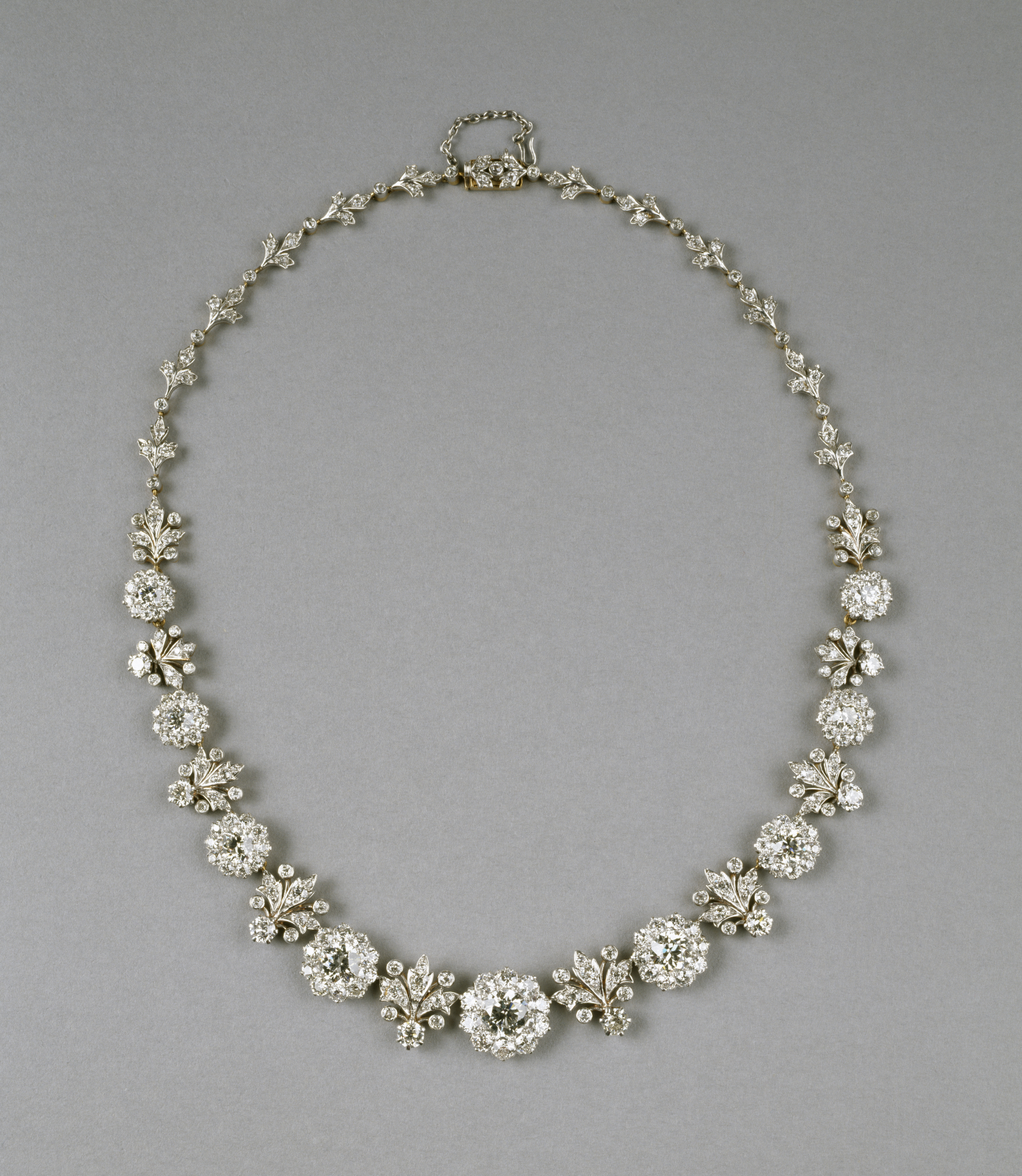
Diamond necklace, c. 1904

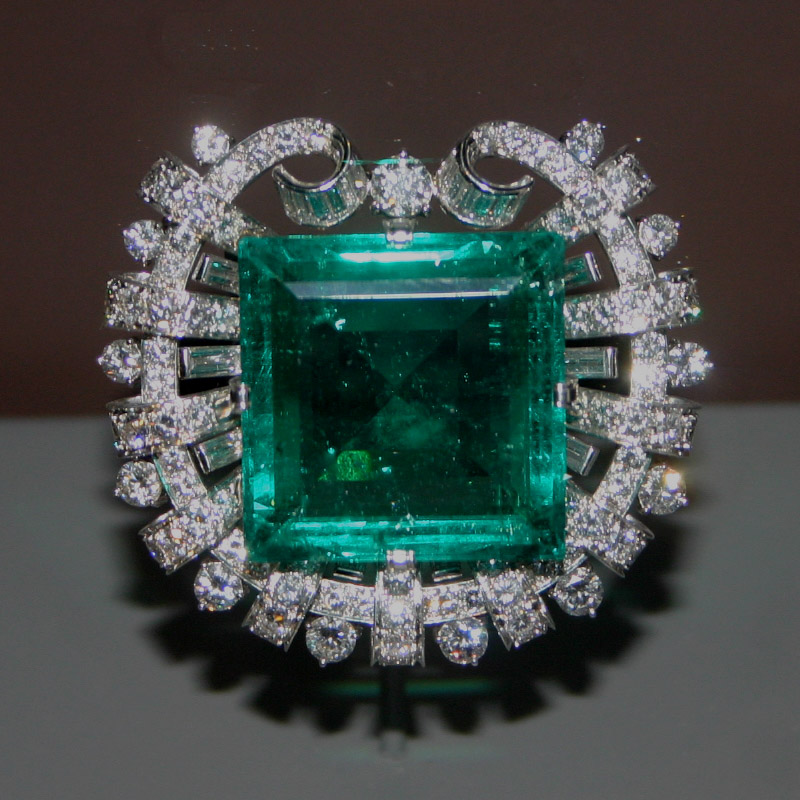
Hooker Emerald Brooch, commissioned by Tiffany in 1950

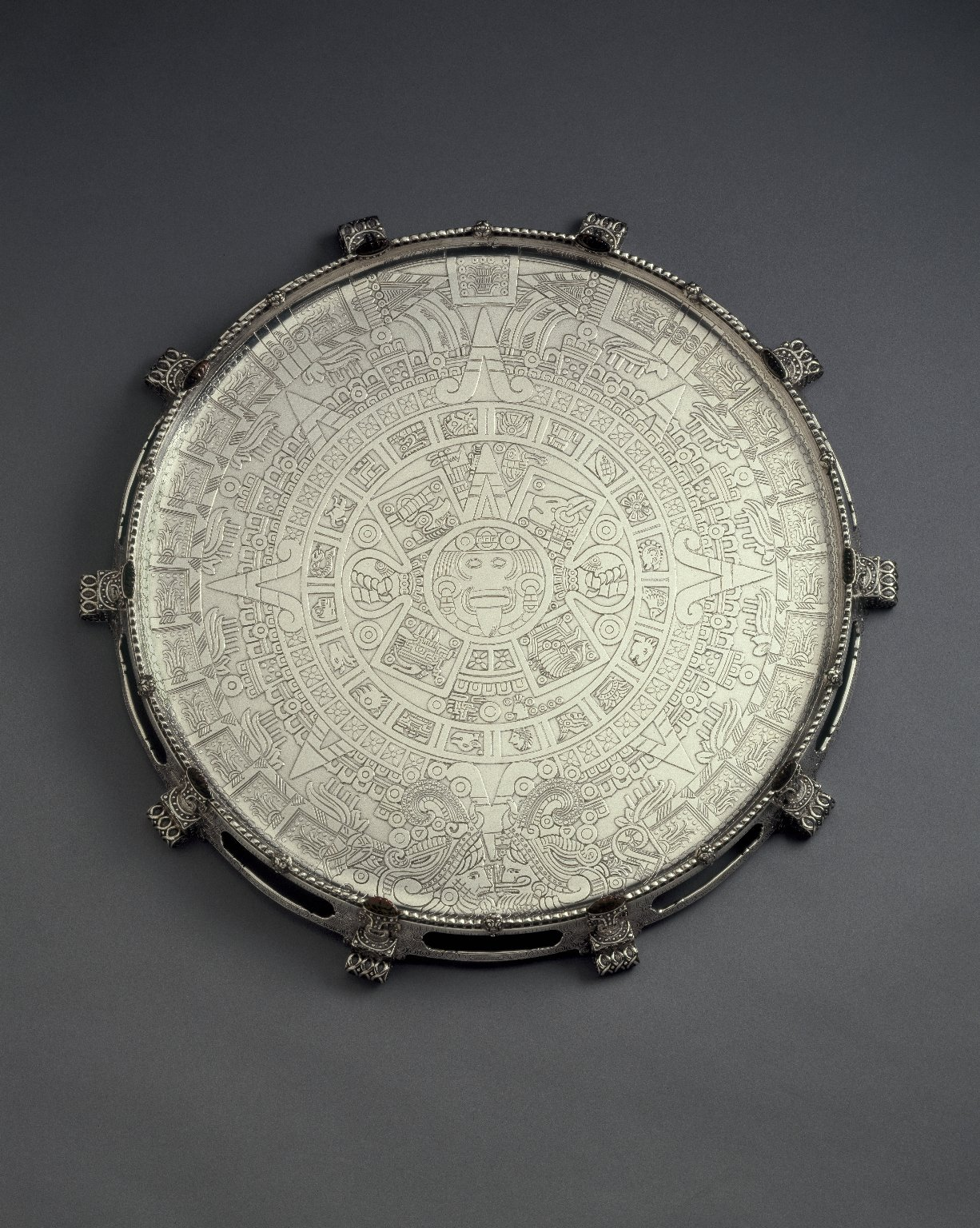
Tray or Waiter, displayed at World's Columbian Exposition, 1893, Brooklyn Museum

== See also ==
- Art Nouveau glass art
- Yeojin Bae
- Clara Driscoll (Tiffany glass designer)
- Walter Hoving
- John Loring (designer)
- Camille Le Tallec
- Tiffany glass
- Tiffany lamp
