= World Baseball Classic =

International baseball tournament

- Most recent season or competition: 2026 World Baseball Classic
- Sport: Baseball
- Founded: 2006; 20 years ago
- Organising body: World Baseball Classic Inc.; World Baseball Softball Confederation
- No. of teams: 20
- Region: International
- Most recent champion: Venezuela (1st title) (2026)
- Most titles: Japan (3 titles)
- Related competitions: Baseball at the Summer Olympics
- Website: world-baseball-classic

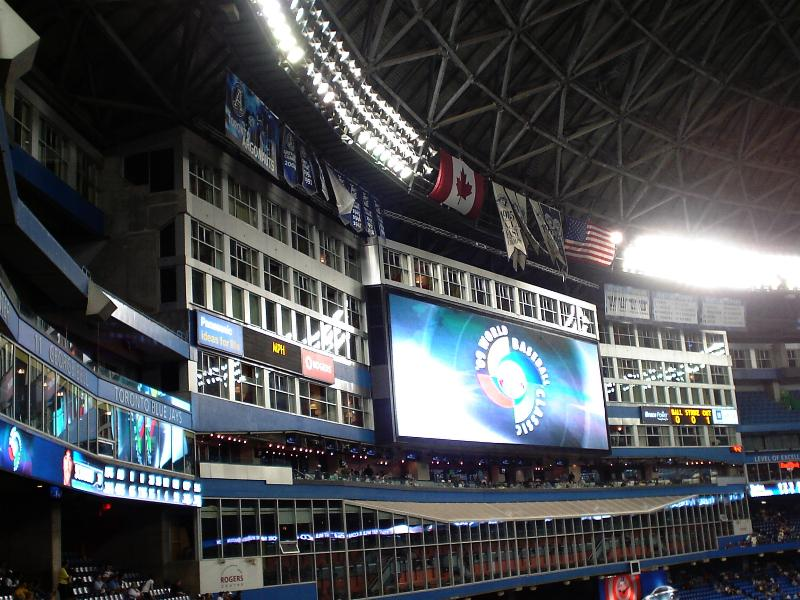
Jumbotron ad for the 2009 WBC at Rogers Centre

The World Baseball Classic (WBC), also referred to as the The Classic is a quadrennial international baseball tournament sanctioned by the World Baseball Softball Confederation (WBSC), (Note: From 2013 onward) the sport's global governing body, and organized by World Baseball Classic Inc., a partnership of the WBSC and Major League Baseball (MLB) in the United States and the Major League Baseball Players Association (MLBPA), also in the U.S. It is the main baseball tournament sanctioned by the WBSC, which grants to the winner the title of "World Champion". The winning team is awarded the World Baseball Classic Championship Trophy.

After a three-year gap between the first two installments of the tournament, plans were made for the WBC to be repeated every four years following the 2009 event. The 2021 event was delayed to 2023 as a result of the COVID-19 pandemic; the 2026 event proceeded as originally scheduled. The four teams to have won the tournament are Japan (2006, 2009, 2023), the Dominican Republic (2013), the United States (2017) and Venezuela (2026).

== History ==
=== 2006–17 ===
The 16-team field for the inaugural 2006 tournament was pre-selected, featuring the countries judged to be the "best baseball-playing nations" in the world; no qualifying competition was held. The tournament format featured round-robin group play in the first and second rounds, followed by single-elimination semifinals and finals. Japan then defeated Cuba 10–6 to be crowned the first champion of the World Baseball Classic.

The next iteration of the tournament, taking place in 2009, featured the same 16 teams from 2006. However, the controversial round-robin format from 2006 was replaced by a modified double-elimination format for the first two rounds (the semifinals and final game remained single-elimination). The eight teams advancing from the first round were the same as in 2006, except for a "Cinderella" performance by the Netherlands, which twice defeated the Dominican Republic to reach the second round.

Japan then emerged victorious for the second straight Classic, winning the final game over South Korea 5–3 in 10 innings. In fact, the final series in 2006 and 2009 rank among the highest-rated sporting events in Japanese television history.

The buildup to the 2013 tournament included a qualifying round for the first time, with the four lowest finishers from 2009 having to re-qualify against 12 additional teams. The round-robin format was revived for the tournament's first-round, while the second-round remained double-elimination. As a result, two new teams competed for the first time: (Brazil and Spain, respectively replacing Panama and South Africa). Although Chinese Taipei lost its 2−0 lead in Korea's three-run eighth-inning rally, and then lost the game, they emerged as winners of the pool and of the second-round berth since Korea's margin of victory was only one run.

The 2013 tournament ended in an all-Caribbean championship game, with the Dominican Republic defeating Puerto Rico. In the final game, the Dominican Republic defeated Puerto Rico, completing the tournament with an 8–0 record, becoming the first undefeated team to win the WBC. Robinson Canó was named the Most Valuable Player of the Classic after he batted 15-for-32 (.469), the most hits in tournament history.

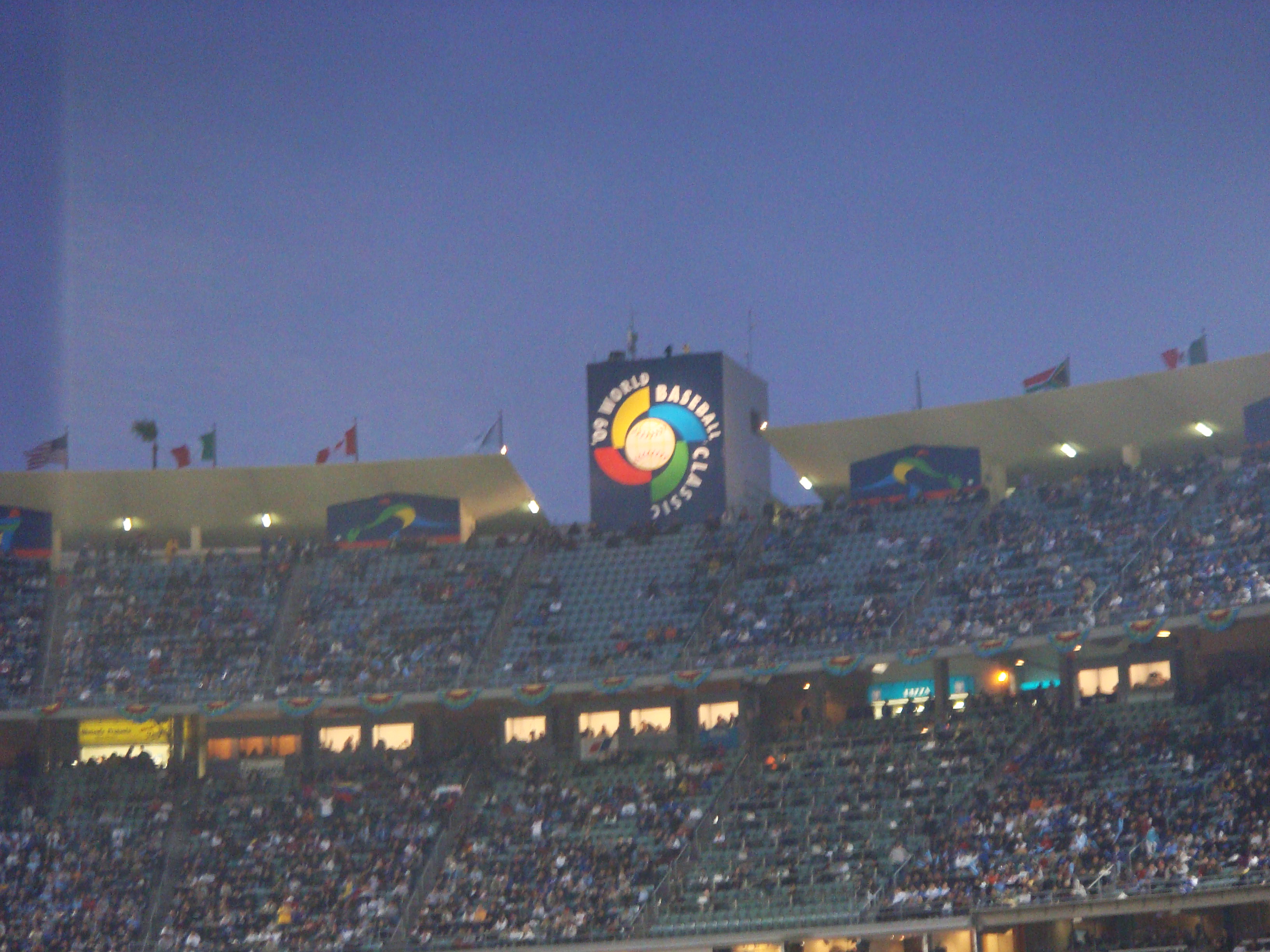
Dodger Stadium hosts the 2009 World Baseball Classic. The top of a ten-story elevator shaft bears the World Baseball Classic logo.

The 2017 tournament returned to the format used in 2006, where both the first and second rounds were round-robin, though with the addition of tiebreaker games if needed. Colombia and Israel qualified for the first time, with Israel using a roster mostly of Jewish American players. The United States won its first WBC championship, defeating Japan and Puerto Rico in the semifinals and finals, respectively.

=== 2023–present ===
In January 2020, MLB announced that the 2021 WBC would be expanded to 20 teams. However, on March 12, MLB announced that the 2021 tournament would be postponed due to the COVID-19 pandemic.

Qualification for the tournament concluded on October 5, 2022, with Nicaragua claiming the final berth in a victory against Brazil. Meanwhile, Japan faced Mexico in the semifinals, who were on a Cinderella run, led by Tampa Bay Rays outfielder Randy Arozarena.

After defeating Cuba in the semifinals by a wide margin, the United States faced Japan in the championship game. The final was incredibly popular in Japan, drawing over 54 million Japanese viewers. With a 3–2 lead, two outs, and no runners on base in the bottom of the ninth inning, Japan's Shohei Ohtani stood on the mound as his Angels teammate Mike Trout stepped up to the plate. After the first pitch of this matchup, Fox Sports commentator Joe Davis reflected on the spectacle, saying, "As Benji Gil said last night, 'Baseball's already won.'" Ohtani lured Trout to swing and miss with a slider down and away, sealing the victory for Japan.

The championship game was one of the most watched games in baseball history. The game was widely praised as an instant classic, with the ending duel between team captains Mike Trout and Shohei Ohtani being considered as one of the greatest moments in the history of the sport.

In 2026, Venezuela defeated Japan and Italy in the quarterfinal and semifinal and won this year's World Baseball Classic tournament, beating the United States 3–2 in the championship game, with Eugenio Suarez hitting a go-ahead double in the top of the 9th to clinch their first title. It was the first major international sporting competition won by Venezuela since the 1945 Amateur World Series, and the second time in Latin America. Maikel García of Venezuela was named the MVP of the tournament.

The tournament has hit new high levels in attendance and US Television viewership: the 2023 attendance record was broken before the pool play was ended, and US viewership of the final hit 10 million viewers for the first time ever.

== Trophy ==
The two trophies Japan won in the 2006 and 2009 WBC have been on display at the Japanese Baseball Hall of Fame while the place to display the trophy won by the Dominican Republic team is yet to be decided.

Following Venezuela's victory in the 2026 WBC, acting president Delcy Rodríguez declared a national holiday for March 18, with the exception of essential workers. She also received the trophy at the presidential palace and declared that it should tour around Venezuela.

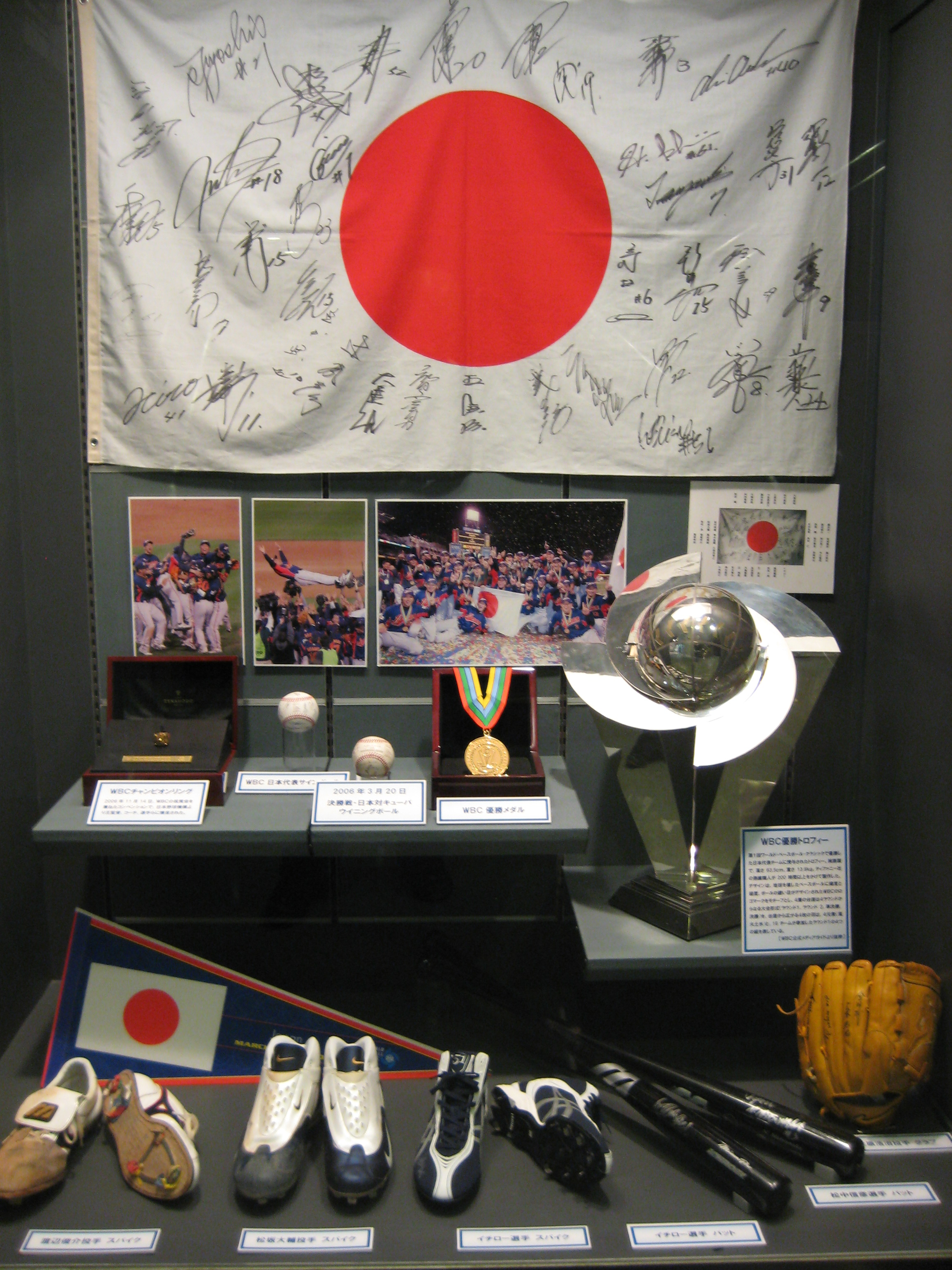
WBC Trophy awarded to Japan in 2006.

== Qualification ==
The first two iterations of the Classic featured the same 16 teams, chosen by invitation. A qualifying round was added leading into the 2013 tournament and takes place in the year before the main tournament. Brazil and Spain were the first new countries to earn berths in the WBC via qualification, and so far the addition of qualifying has allowed seven nations to play in the tournament who were not part of the original 16.

The qualification setup for the 2013 and 2017 WBCs featured the top 12 finishing teams from the previous WBC being automatically entered in the following edition, while the four lowest finishers (the teams that finished in last place in their first-round pools) were relegated to the qualifying round. Qualifying consisted of four four-team modified double-elimination tournaments, with the winners earning the last four slots in the main tournament.

With the 2023 WBC expanding to 20 teams, the qualifying format changed, as well. All 16 participants from the 2017 WBC received automatic bids. The restructured qualifying round consisted of a pair of six-team double-elimination tournaments, from which the winners and runners-up advanced to play in the 2023 WBC.

== Debut of national teams ==
The 2009 tournament did not feature any debuting teams, as the 16 teams from the 2006 tournament were all invited to return. The 2026 tournament was the first tournament since 2009 in which every participating team had played in at least one previous Word Baseball Classic tournament. A total of 23 teams have participated in the World Baseball Classic as of the 2026 tournament.

Year	Debutants	Total	CT
2006	Australia, Canada, China, Chinese Taipei, Cuba, Dominican Republic, Italy, Japan, Mexico, Netherlands, Panama, Puerto Rico, South Korea, South Africa, United States, Venezuela	16	16
2009	None	0	16
2013	Brazil, Spain	2	18
2017	Colombia, Israel	2	20
2023	Great Britain, Czech Republic, Nicaragua	3	23
2026	None	0	23

== Results ==
Keys

- F/N: result/match won after extra innings or mercy rule, where N is the total number of innings in the match
- TBD: to be determined

Ed.	Year	Hosts	First place game			Semifinalists		Teams
Ed.	Year	Hosts	(gold) Champion	Score	(silver) Runner-up	(bronze) Third place	Fourth place	Teams
1	2006	United States; Japan; Puerto Rico	Japan	10–6; Petco Park, San Diego	Cuba	South Korea	Dominican Republic	16
2	2009	United States; Canada; Japan; Mexico; Puerto Rico	Japan	5–3 (F/10); Dodger Stadium, Los Angeles	South Korea	Venezuela	United States	16
3	2013	United States; Japan; Puerto Rico; Taiwan	Dominican Republic	3–0; AT&T Park, San Francisco	Puerto Rico	Japan	Netherlands	16
4	2017	United States; Japan; Mexico; South Korea	United States	8–0; Dodger Stadium, Los Angeles	Puerto Rico	Japan	Netherlands	16
5	2023	United States; Japan; Taiwan	Japan	3–2; LoanDepot Park, Miami	United States	Mexico	Cuba	20
6	2026	United States; Japan; Puerto Rico	Venezuela	3–2; LoanDepot Park, Miami	United States	Dominican Republic	Italy	20

== Medal table ==
Rank	Nation	Gold	Silver	Bronze	Total
1	Japan	3	0	2	5
2	United States	1	2	0	3
3	Dominican Republic	1	0	1	2
3	Venezuela	1	0	1	2
5	Puerto Rico	0	2	0	2
6	South Korea	0	1	1	2
7	Cuba	0	1	0	1
8	Mexico	0	0	1	1
Totals (8 entries)		6	6	6	18

== Performance by confederation ==
This is a summary of the best performances of each confederation in each tournament.

Confederation	2006 (16)	2009 (16)	2013 (16)	2017 (16)	2023 (20)	2026 (20)
WBSC Africa	R1	R1	—	—	—	–
WBSC Americas	2nd	3rd	1st	1st	2nd	1st
WBSC Asia	1st	1st	3rd	3rd	1st	QF
WBSC Europe	R1	R2	4th	4th	QF	4th
WBSC Oceania	R1	R1	R1	R1	QF	R1

== Number of appearances ==
Team	Apps	Record streak	Active streak	Debut	Most recent	Best result
Australia	6	6	6	2006	2026	Quarterfinals (2023)
Canada	6	6	6	2006	2026	Quarterfinals (2026)
Chinese Taipei	6	6	6	2006	2026	Second round (2013)
Cuba	6	6	6	2006	2026	Runners-up (2006)
Dominican Republic	6	6	6	2006	2026	Champions (2013)
Italy	6	6	6	2006	2026	Semifinals (2026)
Japan	6	6	6	2006	2026	Champions (2006, 2009, 2023)
Mexico	6	6	6	2006	2026	Semifinals (2023)
Netherlands	6	6	6	2006	2026	Semifinals (2013, 2017)
Puerto Rico	6	6	6	2006	2026	Runners-up (2013, 2017)
South Korea	6	6	6	2006	2026	Runners-up (2009)
United States	6	6	6	2006	2026	Champions (2017)
Venezuela	6	6	6	2006	2026	Champions (2026)
China	5	5	0	2006	2023	Pool stage
Panama	4	2	2	2006	2026	Pool stage
Colombia	3	3	3	2017	2026	First round/pool stage
Israel	3	3	3	2017	2026	Second round (2017)
Brazil	2	1	1	2013	2026	First round/pool stage
Czech Republic	2	2	2	2023	2026	Pool stage
Great Britain	2	2	2	2023	2026	Pool stage
Nicaragua	2	2	2	2023	2026	Pool stage
South Africa	2	2	0	2006	2009	First round
Spain	1	1	0	2013	2013	First round

== Overall team records ==
Updated after 2026 World Baseball Classic. Teams in bold were part of the 2026 World Baseball Classic.

Team	Part	Pld	W	L	PCT
**Japan**	6	43	34	9	.791
**Dominican Republic**	6	34	25	9	.735
**Puerto Rico**	6	39	26	13	.667
**United States**	6	42	26	16	.619
**South Korea**	6	31	19	12	.613
**Venezuela**	6	36	22	14	.611
**Cuba**	6	36	20	16	.556
**Israel**	3	14	7	7	.500
**Mexico**	6	28	13	15	.464
**Italy**	6	26	12	14	.462
**Netherlands**	6	32	14	18	.438
**Canada**	6	20	8	12	.400
**Australia**	6	21	7	14	.333
**Chinese Taipei**	6	21	7	14	.333
**Colombia**	3	11	3	8	.273
**Great Britain**	2	8	2	6	.250
**Panama**	4	13	3	10	.231
China	5	16	2	14	.125
**Czech Republic**	2	8	1	7	.125
Spain	1	3	0	3	.000
South Africa	2	5	0	5	.000
**Brazil**	2	7	0	7	.000
**Nicaragua**	2	8	0	8	.000

== Honors ==
=== Most Valuable Player ===
The inaugural winner of the Most Valuable Player award in 2006 was Japan's Daisuke Matsuzaka, who pitched 13 innings and finished with a 3–0 record. Soon after this performance, Matsuzaka received a multi-million dollar contract to join the Boston Red Sox of MLB. Again in the 2009 WBC, Matsuzaka received the world classic MVP, finishing with a record of 3–0 and an ERA of 2.54. In 2013, Robinson Canó won MVP after hitting .469 with two home runs and six RBI in the tournament. Toronto Blue Jays pitcher Marcus Stroman won the award in 2017 for the U.S. Stroman posted a 2.35 ERA over three starts and no-hit Puerto Rico through six innings in an 8–0 win in the Finals.

In 2023, Los Angeles Angels two-way superstar Shohei Ohtani claimed MVP honors after slashing .435/.606/.739 as a hitter and posting a 1.86 ERA and 11 strikeouts in 9 2/3 innings as a pitcher, also pitching the final inning of Japan's win over the U.S. in the final. The 2026 MVP was Kansas City Royals third baseman Maikel García, who registered 10 hits and 7 RBI, including a key home run in Venezuela's upset quarterfinal win over Japan and an RBI in the championship game.

Year	Player	Position	Team
2006	Daisuke Matsuzaka	Starting pitcher	Japan
2009	Daisuke Matsuzaka (2)	Starting pitcher	Japan
2013	Robinson Canó	Second baseman	Dominican Republic
2017	Marcus Stroman	Starting pitcher	United States
2023	Shohei Ohtani	Starting pitcher Designated hitter	Japan
2026	Maikel García	Third baseman	Venezuela

=== All-WBC teams ===
At the end of each tournament, an all-star team is selected based on their play in the tournament. Three pitchers, eight other position players (one each at each position, including three outfielders), and a designated hitter are named to the team. Japanese pitcher Daisuke Matsuzaka, Puerto Rican catcher Yadier Molina and Puerto Rican shortstop Javier Báez are the only players to be named to the All-WBC team twice. Japanese two-way player Shohei Ohtani is the only player to be named to the All-WBC team at two separate positions, having been named to the 2023 team as both a designated hitter and a pitcher.

Pos.	2006	2009	2013	2017	2023	2026
C	(Japan) Tomoya Satozaki	(Puerto Rico) Iván Rodríguez	(Puerto Rico) Yadier Molina	(Puerto Rico) Yadier Molina	(Venezuela) Salvador Pérez	(Dominican Republic) Austin Wells
1B	(South Korea) Seung-yuop Lee	(South Korea) Tae-kyun Kim	(Dominican Republic) Edwin Encarnación	(United States) Eric Hosmer	(Chinese Taipei) Yu Chang	(Venezuela) Luis Arráez
2B	(Cuba) Yulieski Gourriel	(Venezuela) José López	**(Dominican Republic) Robinson Canó**	(Puerto Rico) Javier Báez	(Puerto Rico) Javier Báez	(United States) Brice Turang
3B	(Dominican Republic) Adrián Beltré	(South Korea) Bum-ho Lee	(United States) David Wright	(Puerto Rico) Carlos Correa	(Cuba) Yoán Moncada	**(Venezuela) Maikel García**
SS	(United States) Derek Jeter	(United States) Jimmy Rollins	(Dominican Republic) José Reyes	(Puerto Rico) Francisco Lindor	(United States) Trea Turner	(Venezuela) Ezequiel Tovar
OF	(United States) Ken Griffey Jr.	(Japan) Norichika Aoki	(Dominican Republic) Nelson Cruz	(Netherlands) Wladimir Balentien	(Mexico) Randy Arozarena	(United States) Roman Anthony
OF	(South Korea) Jong-beom Lee	(Cuba) Frederich Cepeda	(Puerto Rico) Ángel Pagán	(Dominican Republic) Gregory Polanco	(United States) Mike Trout	(Dominican Republic) Fernando Tatís Jr.
OF	(Japan) Ichiro Suzuki	(Cuba) Yoenis Céspedes	(Canada) Michael Saunders	(United States) Christian Yelich	(Japan) Masataka Yoshida	(Italy) Dante Nori
DH	(Cuba) Yoandy Garlobo	(South Korea) Hyun-soo Kim	(Japan) Hirokazu Ibata	(Puerto Rico) Carlos Beltrán	(Japan) **Shohei Ohtani**	(Japan) Shohei Ohtani
P	(Cuba) Yadel Martí	(South Korea) Jung-keun Bong	(Puerto Rico) Nelson Figueroa	(Japan) Kodai Senga	(Japan) **Shohei Ohtani**	(United States) Paul Skenes
P	(Japan) **Daisuke Matsuzaka**	(Japan) Hisashi Iwakuma	(Japan) Kenta Maeda	**(United States) Marcus Stroman**	(Mexico) Patrick Sandoval	(United States) Logan Webb
P	(South Korea) Chan Ho Park	(Japan) **Daisuke Matsuzaka**	(Dominican Republic) Fernando Rodney	(Israel) Josh Zeid	(Cuba) Miguel Romero	(Italy) Aaron Nola

Overall, players representing 13 countries have been named to an All-WBC team, with Japan and the United States leading the way with 13 representatives each.

Rank	2006	2009	2013	2017	2023	2026	Total
Japan	3	3	2	1	3	1	13
United States	2	1	1	3	2	4	13
Puerto Rico	0	1	3	5	1	0	10
Dominican Republic	1	0	5	1	0	2	9
South Korea	3	4	0	0	0	0	7
Cuba	3	2	0	0	2	0	7
Venezuela	0	1	0	0	1	3	5
Mexico	0	0	0	0	2	0	2
Italy	0	0	0	0	0	2	2
Canada	0	0	1	0	0	0	1
Israel	0	0	0	1	0	0	1
Netherlands	0	0	0	1	0	0	1
Chinese Taipei	0	0	0	0	1	0	1

=== Statistical leaders ===
All-time WBC individual leaders in various counting statistical categories through the end of the 2023 tournament, excluding qualifier games.

**Batting**

Statistic	Player	Total
Hits	(Cuba) Frederich Cepeda	32
Home runs	(Cuba) Alfredo Despaigne	7
Runs batted in	(Cuba) Frederich Cepeda	23
Runs scored	(Cuba) Frederich Cepeda	19
Doubles	(Cuba) Frederich Cepeda (Canada) Justin Morneau	8
Triples	(Cuba) Yoenis Cespedes	3
Strikeouts	(Puerto Rico) Carlos Beltrán	20
Stolen bases	5 tied with	5
Games played	(Puerto Rico) Carlos Beltrán	28
At-bats	(Puerto Rico) Carlos Beltrán	95

**Pitching**

Statistic	Player	Total
Wins	(Japan) Daisuke Matsuzaka	6
Losses	(Chinese Taipei) Hung-wen Chen	3
Games	(Dominican Republic) Fernando Rodney	15
Starts	(Japan) Daisuke Matsuzaka (Dominican Republic) Edinson Volquez	6
Saves	(Dominican Republic) Fernando Rodney	8
Innings pitched	(Netherlands) Diegomar Markwell	28.0
Hits allowed	(Netherlands) Diegomar Markwell	30
Runs allowed	(South Africa) Barry Armitage	14
Earned runs allowed	(South Africa) Barry Armitage (Netherlands) David Bergman	12
Walks	(Dominican Republic) Edinson Volquez	11
Strikeouts	(Japan) Daisuke Matsuzaka	23

== Broadcasting ==
Sport24 secured the rights for international in-flight and cruise ship travel.

Territory	Rights holder(s)	Ref.
Australia, New Zealand, and Oceania	ESPN	
Austria, Germany, Liechtenstein, Luxembourg, and Switzerland	Sportdigital	
Brazil	ESPN and Disney+	
Canada	Sportsnet (English)	
Canada	TVA Sports (French)	
Caribbean	ESPN and Disney+	
China	BesTV, Douyin, MIGU, Tencent Video, Fujian TV, and Youku	
Colombia	Caracol HD2, (Note: Colombia games only) Ditu (Note: Colombia games only)	
Cuba	Tele Rebelde	
Czechia	Česká Televize	
Dominican Republic	VTV 32, Tele Antillas, and Coral 39	
France	beIN Sports	
Hungary	Sport1	
Ireland and United Kingdom	TNT Sports	
Israel	Sports 5	
Italy and San Marino	Sky Sport Italy and RAI 2/RAI Sport	
Japan	Netflix	
Japan	Nippon Hoso (Note: all Japan games), Bunka Hōsō, (Note: one quarterfinal, one semifinal, and the final) and Radiko (Audio Only)	
South Korea	TVING, tvN/tvN Sports, KBS, SBS, and MBC	
Latin America	ESPN and Disney+	
Latin America	1 Baseball Network (Note: except Mexico)	
Macau and Southeast Asia	SPOTV	
MENA	beIN Sports	
Mexico	TelevisaUnivision and ESPN (Note: All Mexico games, one semifinal, and the final on Canal 5, Nueve, or ViX)	
Netherlands	ESPN	
Nicaragua	Viva Nicaragua	
Panama	RPC and TV Max	
Puerto Rico	WAPA Deportes	
Sub-Saharan Africa	ESPN and Disney+	
Taiwan	ELTA (Note: Official broadcasters; for CHT MOD and OTT (ELTA.tv and Hami Video)), EBC, TTV, (Note: Terrestrial and cable TV broadcast only) and Videoland	
Turkey	S Sport	
United States	Fox Sports (English)	
United States	Fox Deportes (Spanish)	
Venezuela	Televen and Venevisión	

== See also ==
- Baseball at the Summer Olympics
- Baseball World Cup
- World Series
