= Michael J. Kowalski =

- Born: 1952 (age 73–74)
- Occupations: Chairman, Tiffany & Co.

Michael J. Kowalski (born 1952) is an American businessman and the interim CEO of Tiffany & Co. He was the CEO of Tiffany & Co. for 16 years, from February 1999 until March 31, 2015, remaining a non-executive chairman. He became the chairman of the board in January 2003. He joined Tiffany in 1983 as director of financial planning. As the company continues to look for a new CEO after the resignation of Kowalski's successor Frederic Cumenal in February 2017, Kowalski was appointed interim CEO.

== Early life and education ==
Kowalski earned his B.S. from the University of Pennsylvania's Wharton School and an M.B.A. from the Harvard School of Business.

== Environmentalism ==
Kowalski took an interest in environmental matters at the age of 15, when he protested a plan to dam the Delaware River. In 2002, he was the force behind the decision for Tiffany to stop selling coral. He was also active in protesting a proposed gold and copper mine in Bristol Bay, Alaska. Upon his retirement as CEO Kowalski was asked what his plans were after leaving Tiffany and he said to become an environmental activist.
