= World Baseball Classic Inc. =

International baseball, softball, and Baseball5 governing body

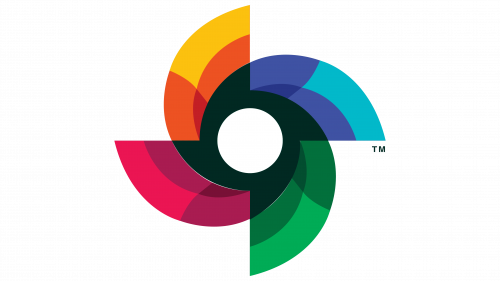
- Abbreviation: WBCI
- Founded: 2006; 20 years ago
- Legal status: World Baseball Classic
- Headquarters: New York City, United States
- Region served: Worldwide
- Official language: English; Spanish; Japanese
- President: Jim Small
- Main organ: Congress
- Parent organization: Major League Baseball Major League Baseball Players Association
- Website: world-baseball-classic

World Baseball Classic Inc. (WBCI) is an organizing committee that organizes the World Baseball Classic and consists of representatives from Major League Baseball (MLB) and the Major League Baseball Players Association (MLBPA).

After a three-year gap between the first two installments of the tournament, plans were made for the World Baseball Classic to be repeated every four years following the 2009 event. The third installment of the Classic was held in 2013, and the fourth was held in 2017.

The fifth and most recent Classic was scheduled for 2021, but was postponed due to the COVID-19 pandemic. After the pandemic-induced delay, the 2023 World Baseball Classic was held between March 8–21, with Japan defeating the United States 3–2 in the championship game.

The sixth and next Classic is scheduled for 2026, with the scheduling frequency of future Classic editions being subject to the terms and conditions agreed at the next collective bargaining agreement (CBA) between Major League Baseball (MLB) and the Major League Baseball Players Association.

== Eligibility and participation ==
=== Eligibility ===
A player is eligible to participate on a WBC team if any one of the following criteria is met:

- The player is a citizen of the nation the team represents.
- The player is qualified for citizenship or to hold a passport under the laws of a nation represented by a team, but has not been granted citizenship or been issued a passport; in this case, the player may be made eligible by World Baseball Classic Inc. upon petition by the player or team.
- The player is a permanent legal resident of the nation or territory the team represents.
- The player was born in the nation or territory the team represents.
- The player has one parent who is or, if deceased, was a citizen of the nation the team represents.
- The player has one parent who was born in the nation or territory the team represents.

=== Player participation ===
Although many elite MLB pitchers do not participate due to club-imposed conditioning limits and insurance regulations, the tournament continues to feature a strong roster of top-tier position players.

In 2006, many high caliber players from both MLB and in leagues around the world participated in the WBC. Amongst the players that made the All-WBC team were Americans Derek Jeter and Ken Griffey Jr. From Japan, Daisuke Matsuzaka, Ichiro Suzuki, and Tomoya Satozaki were on the team. Other internationals included players from Cuba—Yulieski Gurriel, Yoandy Garlobo, and Yadel Martí; and from the Dominican Republic—Albert Pujols, Pedro Martínez, and José Bautista. The 2009 classic saw a similarly high-profile field, with a number of players such as future Hall of Famers Pedro Martínez, Iván Rodríguez, and Chipper Jones and the major international debuts of Cuba's Yoenis Céspedes and Aroldis Chapman.

For the 2013 tournament, Japanese players threatened to boycott the event despite its domestic popularity, before later agreeing to take part after reaching a compromise in September 2012 with tournament organizers on sharing sponsorship and licensing revenue. Nevertheless, many key players from the 2009 Japanese team such as Yu Darvish, Ichiro, and Hisashi Iwakuma did not participate. However, other prominent MLB players played, such as Miguel Cabrera, David Wright, R. A. Dickey, Joey Votto, Adrián González, Robinson Canó, and José Reyes, among many others.

In 2017, former All-Stars such as Adam Jones, Chris Archer, Buster Posey, Paul Goldschmidt, Andrew McCutchen and others played for the United States. For the Dominican Republic, former All-Stars Adrián Beltré, Robinson Canó, Manny Machado, José Reyes, Edinson Vólquez, and more participated. Adrián González returned for Mexico, and Yadier Molina and Carlos Beltrán represented Puerto Rico alongside up-and-coming stars such as Javier Báez, Carlos Correa, and Francisco Lindor. Venezuela's roster included Jose Altuve and Miguel Cabrera.

In 2023, former All-Stars on the U.S. included Mike Trout, Nolan Arenado, Pete Alonso, Adam Wainwright, Mookie Betts, Tim Anderson, Jeff McNeil, J. T. Realmuto, Kyle Schwarber, Trea Turner, Kyle Tucker, Ryan Pressly, Lance Lynn, Miles Mikolas, and Paul Goldschmidt. St Louis Cardinals teammates Lars Nootbaar and Tommy Edman participated as part of Japan and South Korea, respectively, in honor of their mothers' heritages. Similarly, Los Angeles Dodgers star Freddie Freeman played for Canada, in honor of his late mother. Marcus Stroman, the MVP of the 2017 WBC with the U.S., chose to play for Puerto Rico in 2023.

Randy Arrozarena, who was born in Cuba, opted to play for Mexico, since WBC rules allowed players who legally were residents in a country to play for that country, having asked Mexican president Andrés Manuel López Obrador to help him in his case for approval of his application as a citizen of Mexico.

=== Involvement of professional leagues ===
Similarly, Nippon Professional Baseball (NPB) and its players' association had a disagreement over participation in the tournament. While the owners initially agreed to the invitation, the players' union was concerned about the time of year the tournament was scheduled to take place, as well as their right to be better represented for the 2009 tournament. On September 16, 2005, after four months of negotiations, NPB officially notified the IBAF and MLB they had accepted the invitation.

The tournament is the first of its kind to have national teams featuring their best professional players from the top-level major leagues around the world, including MLB in the U.S. and Nippon Professional Baseball (NPB) in Japan. In addition to providing a format for the best baseball players in the world to compete against one another while representing their home countries, the WBC was created in order to further promote the game around the globe.

Prior to the advent of the WBC, there was no international baseball championship of national teams that saw universal participation from players across the globe. Outside the United States, the formally-recognized "world championship" was the Baseball World Cup, sanctioned by the International Baseball Federation (IBAF) and held 38 times from 1938 to 2011; it was known as the Amateur World Series until 1988. The inaugural 1938 Amateur World Series was contested by Great Britain and the United States over a series of five games from August 13 to 20 in England, and was won by Great Britain. Cuba was by far the most successful team at the Baseball World Cup, winning 25 of the 39 editions.

Baseball was also intermittently played at the Summer Olympic Games as early as 1912, although it was not recognized as an official demonstration sport until the 1984 Los Angeles Games. It would take another eight years, at the 1992 Games, for baseball to be accorded the status of a medal sport. In 2012 it was once again dropped from the Olympic program, appearing as an optional event in 2020.

For most of their history, the Olympics and Baseball World Cup were open only to amateur (i.e. non-professional) players; as a result, those participating in top-level professional baseball leagues in the United States, Japan, and elsewhere were not included. Although both competitions formally rescinded their amateur-only status in the 1990s, allowing professional players to participate, there was little participation from major league players. Nevertheless, the idea of a tournament with the express involvement of top-level professional ballplayers had been seriously considered since the mid-1990s.

The WBC previously coexisted with Olympic baseball (until 2008) and the Baseball World Cup (until 2011) as International Baseball Federation (IBAF) sanctioned tournaments. The final men's Baseball World Cup was held in 2011. It was discontinued in 2013, after an MLB suggestion to reorganize the international baseball calendar. WBSC accepted the suggestion after an executive meeting, giving the "World Champion" title to the WBC winner on the condition that the Classic should have direct qualifications and follow international anti-doping rules.

The IBAF merged with the International Softball Federation in 2013 to form the World Baseball Softball Confederation (WBSC). That same year, the WBSC discontinued the Baseball World Cup, last held in 2011, making the World Baseball Classic one of the two main adult baseball tournaments sanctioned by the WBSC, alongside the Premier12.

The WBC is often compared to the Premier12 as they are the only two adult international baseball tournaments. However, the WBC is the only one which grants to the winner the title of "World Champion".

Alongside the WBSC recognition, another reason WBC is also considered larger is that active players in MLB, widely regarded as the highest-level baseball league in the world, do not participate in the Premier12.

Despite this, controversially, the WBSC World Rankings award higher points for winning the Premier12 than winning the WBC.

== Rules of play ==
In addition to the standard rules of baseball, the World Baseball Classic employs the following additional rules:

=== Pitching ===
A pitcher cannot pitch more than:

- 85 pitches per game in the Qualifying Round (all tournaments since 2013, when this round was introduced)
- 65 pitches per game in the First Round (all tournaments except 2009, in which the limit was 70)
- 80 pitches per game in the Second Round (all tournaments except 2009, in which the limit was 85)
- 95 pitches per game in the Championship Round (all tournaments except 2009, in which the limit was 100)

A pitcher can finish a batter's plate appearance even if the pitch limit is reached, but must come out after completing the plate appearance.

In addition, these "rest" requirements are in place after a pitcher is used in a game:

- If a pitcher throws 50 or more pitches, at least four days must pass until he pitches again
- If a pitcher throws 30 or more pitches, at least one day must pass until he pitches again
- If a pitcher pitches on consecutive days, at least one day must pass until he pitches again

A pitcher can finish a batter's plate appearance once each threshold is reached and not have to sit out the required amount of days if he is removed after this plate appearance.

=== Mercy rules ===
To prevent one-sided contests, games are ended early if one team is ahead by a certain amount. These mercy rules do not apply during the semi-finals or final.

- A game will end if either team is leading by at least 15 runs after the completion of an inning, beginning with the fifth inning.
- A game will end if either team is leading by at least 10 runs after the completion of an inning, beginning with the seventh inning.

=== Designated hitter ===
The designated hitter rule applies for all games.

=== Extra innings ===
From 2009 through 2017, starting with the 11th inning, teams automatically start with runners on first and second base. The baserunners are the players in the two batting order positions previous to the leadoff batter for the inning (or substitutes called in to pinch-run for those players). Organizers put this rule in place starting with the 2009 tournament, although originally, it did not come into effect until the 13th inning. The intention behind the rule is to help ensure extra-inning games end in as timely a manner as possible, reducing the chance of seeing marathon extra-inning games that place undue strain on players, particularly pitchers. As no extra-inning games in either the 2009 or 2013 WBCs reached the point where the rule came into play, it took until the 2017 WBC for it to affect a game's outcome. There were three such games in 2017, and all three were decided in the 11th inning.

In 2023, the rule was changed to bring the WBC in line with MLB extra-innings rules.

=== Video replay review ===
Beginning in the 2023 WBC, video review is available for all situations as it would be during a MLB regular season game.

=== Pitch clock ===
Beginning with the 2026 edition, the WBC will use a pitch clock for all games, following MLB rules. A pitcher will have 15 seconds to begin his pitching motion with no baserunners or 18 seconds if there is at least one baserunner, with an automatic ball called if the pitch clock reaches zero before a pitch is thrown.

=== Run differential ===
Unlike regular season play, where the number of runs by which a team wins a game is not relevant, the number of runs by which a WBC team wins may be relevant if a tie later develops in the standings. In such cases, teams are ranked by their Team Quality Balance, which rewards them for scoring by as many runs as possible, and for winning with as few of their batters as possible making outs when batting in the bottom of the inning. This caused problems during the 2013 WBC, where one game led to a bench-clearing brawl between Canada and Mexico: Canadian hitter Chris Robinson had bunted for a base hit after Canada had already taken a large lead, causing Mexican pitcher Arnold León to throw three consecutive pitches at the next hitter, Rene Tosoni.

These tiebreakers were changed starting in the 2017 WBC to be "fewest runs allowed per inning of defense in head-to-head games", which places an emphasis on scoring as many runs as possible, while also allowing the fewest runs possible.

== Established process ==
Gene Orza, counsel and board member of the Major League Baseball Players Association (MLBPA), began campaigning for such a tournament in 2004, enlisting the support of IBAF president Aldo Notari. The inaugural tournament was announced by MLB commissioner Bud Selig and MLBPA president Donald Fehr on May 11, 2005. The success of the 2006 tournament led organizers to immediately begin planning for a follow-up tournament in 2009.

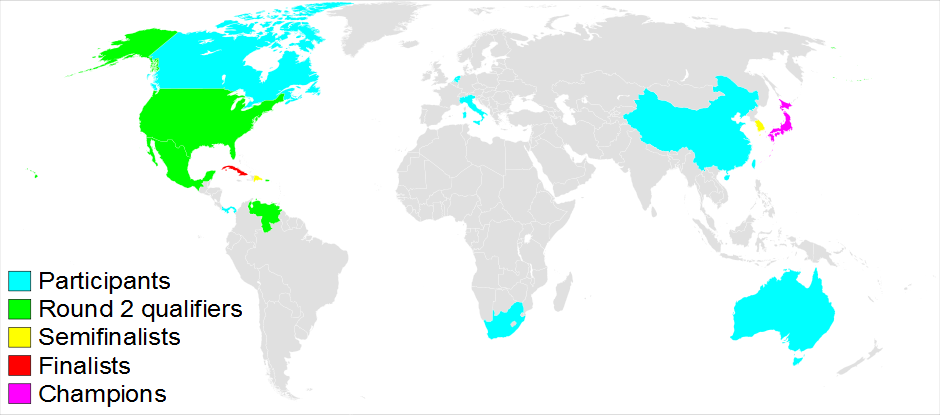
Map listing the countries that participated in the first edition of the World Baseball Classic

The first World Baseball Classic tournament was announced in May 2005 by Bud Selig, the commissioner of Major League Baseball. MLB had been attempting to create such a tournament for at least two years, but faced resistance from both owners and the MLBPA. MLB owners, notably New York Yankees owner George Steinbrenner, had been concerned about their star players being injured in international play before the beginning of spring training and the regular season. This was a concern for the MLBPA as well, but their primary objection was with drug testing. MLB wanted the stricter Olympic standards in place for the tournament, while the union wanted the more lax MLB standards in place at the time. Eventually, a deal was reached on insurance for player contracts and a fairly tough drug testing standard. MLB teams would not be able to directly block their players from participating.

The tournament, proposed in 2005 by MLB and its players association, was first held in 2006 as an invitational event. It previously coexisted with Olympic baseball (until 2008) and the Baseball World Cup (until 2011) as tournaments sanctioned by the International Baseball Federation, the predecessor to the WBSC. The Baseball World Cup was discontinued after the 2011 edition, when the WBSC accepted MLB's suggestion to make the WBC the officially-sanctioned world championship, on the condition that the Classic should have direct qualifications and follow international anti-doping rules.

== See also ==
- MLB International
- Kodak World Baseball Classic, a 1972 minor league tournament with the same name
- Baseball United Arab Classic, an Arab international baseball tournament using WBC rules.
- Baseball awards § World
- Major achievements in baseball and softball by nation
