= Erich Bacchus =

American baseball umpire (born 1990)

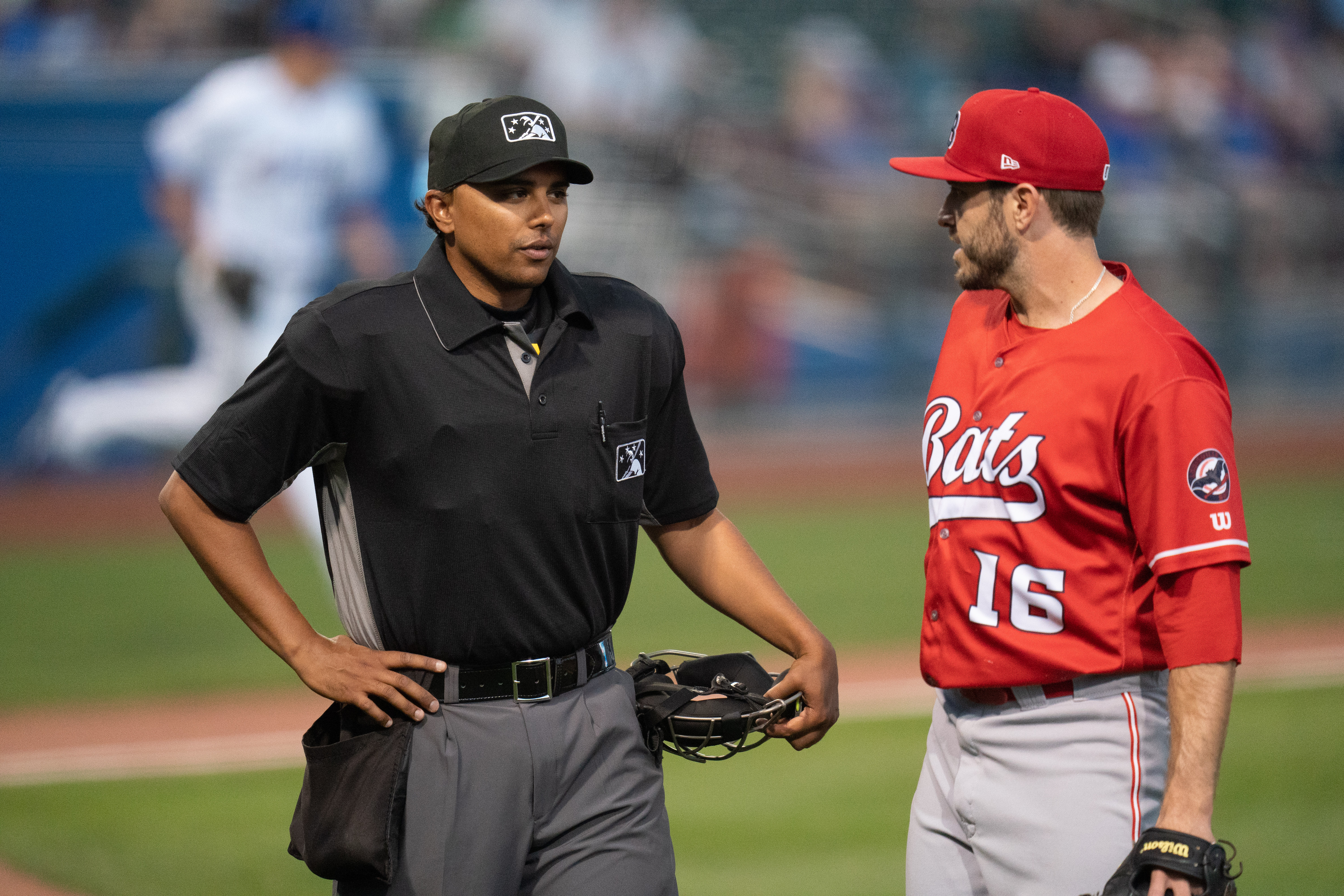
- Bacchus (left) talks with Connor Overton during a 2022 International League game

MLB – No. 12
- Umpire
- Born: November 2, 1990 (age 35); Germantown, Maryland, U.S.

MLB debut
- August 7, 2020

Crew information
- Umpiring crew: I
- Crew members: #63 Laz Díaz (crew chief); #7 Brian O'Nora; #96 Chris Segal; #12 Erich Bacchus

Career highlights and awards
- Special Assignments: Wild Card Games/Series (2024, 2025, 2026); All Star Game (2025)

Erich Bacchus (born November 2, 1990) is an American professional baseball umpire. He has been an umpire in Major League Baseball since 2020 and was promoted to the full-time umpiring staff in 2023. Bacchus wears uniform number 12.

== Career ==
Bacchus graduated from the Wendelstedt Umpire School in 2012 and began his career in 2017, umpiring in the Arizona League, New York-Penn League, Florida Instructional League, South Atlantic League, Carolina League, Eastern League and International League. He also worked one season in the summer collegiate Coastal Plain League as part of an umpire development agreement with Major League Baseball (MLB). During that time, he was chosen as an umpire for the 2017 All-Star Futures Game and the 2019 International League Championship Series.

He made his MLB debut on August 7, 2020 as the second base umpire during a game between the Cincinnati Reds and Milwaukee Brewers at Miller Park.

On May 16, 2024, Bacchus ejected Houston Astros pitcher Ronel Blanco for using a foreign substance on his glove while pitching. According to the umpire, it was "the stickiest stuff I’ve felt on a glove". The next month, he was criticized for a call during a June 6 game between the San Diego Padres and the Arizona Diamondbacks, which saw Bacchus call Jake Cronenworth out on a third-strike call on a high pitch. Bacchus was selected as an umpire for the 2025 All-Star Game.

Bacchus has been an instructor at the Wendelstedt Umpire School since 2016.

== Personal life ==
An avid runner, Bacchus competed in a half marathon on behalf of UMPS CARE Charities in Holly Springs, North Carolina.

Bacchus holds dual citizenship, as a citizen of both the United States and Switzerland.
