= Zach McKinstry =

American baseball player (born 1995)

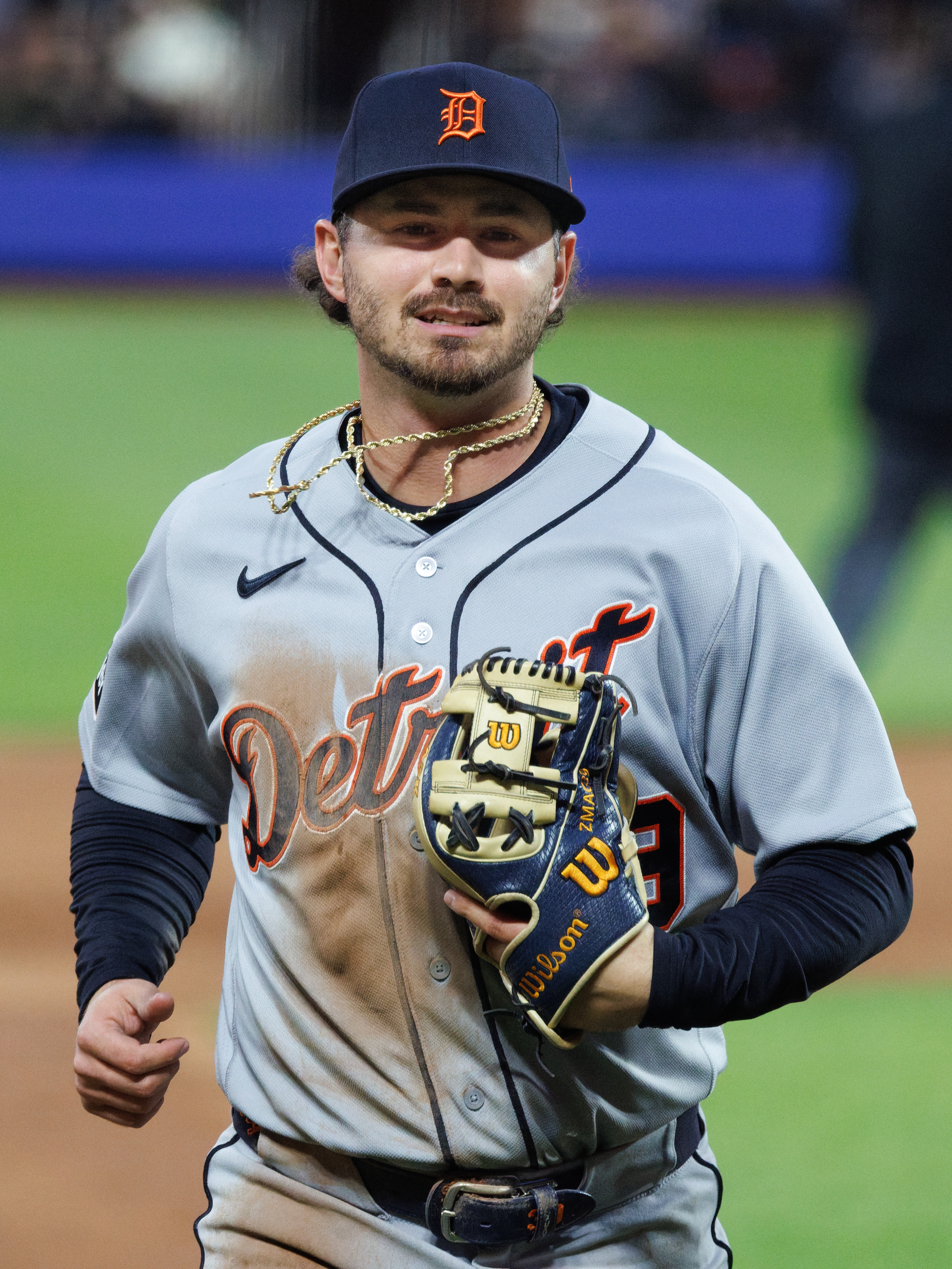
- McKinstry with the Detroit Tigers in 2026

Detroit Tigers – No. 39
- Utility player
- Born: April 29, 1995 (age 31); Toledo, Ohio, U.S.
- Bats: Left Throws: Right

MLB debut
- September 16, 2020, for the Los Angeles Dodgers

MLB statistics (through 2026 season)
- Batting average: .225
- Home runs: 41
- Runs batted in: 176
- Stats at Baseball Reference

Teams
- Los Angeles Dodgers (2020–2022); Chicago Cubs (2022); Detroit Tigers (2023–present)

Career highlights and awards
- All-Star (2025); Silver Slugger Award (2025)

Zachary McKinstry (born April 29, 1995) is an American professional baseball utility player for the Detroit Tigers of Major League Baseball (MLB). He has previously played in MLB for the Los Angeles Dodgers and Chicago Cubs. In 2025, McKinstry was named to his first All-Star game.

== Amateur career ==
McKinstry graduated from North Side High School in Fort Wayne, Indiana, where he was a three-time all-conference selection and hit .595 as a junior to be selected to the all-area team. He was rated as the eighth-best prospect in the state of Indiana.

McKinstry played college baseball for the Central Michigan University Chippewas. He was named to the 2015 Louisville Slugger Freshman All-American team and in 2016 he was the team co-MVP, while leading the team in batting average, on base percentage and stolen bases. He played for the Waterloo Bucks of the Northwoods League after the 2015 season and the Orleans Firebirds of the Cape Cod League after the 2016 season. While playing for Waterloo in 2015, he learned that his parents house had burned to the ground in a fire.

== Professional career ==
=== Los Angeles Dodgers ===
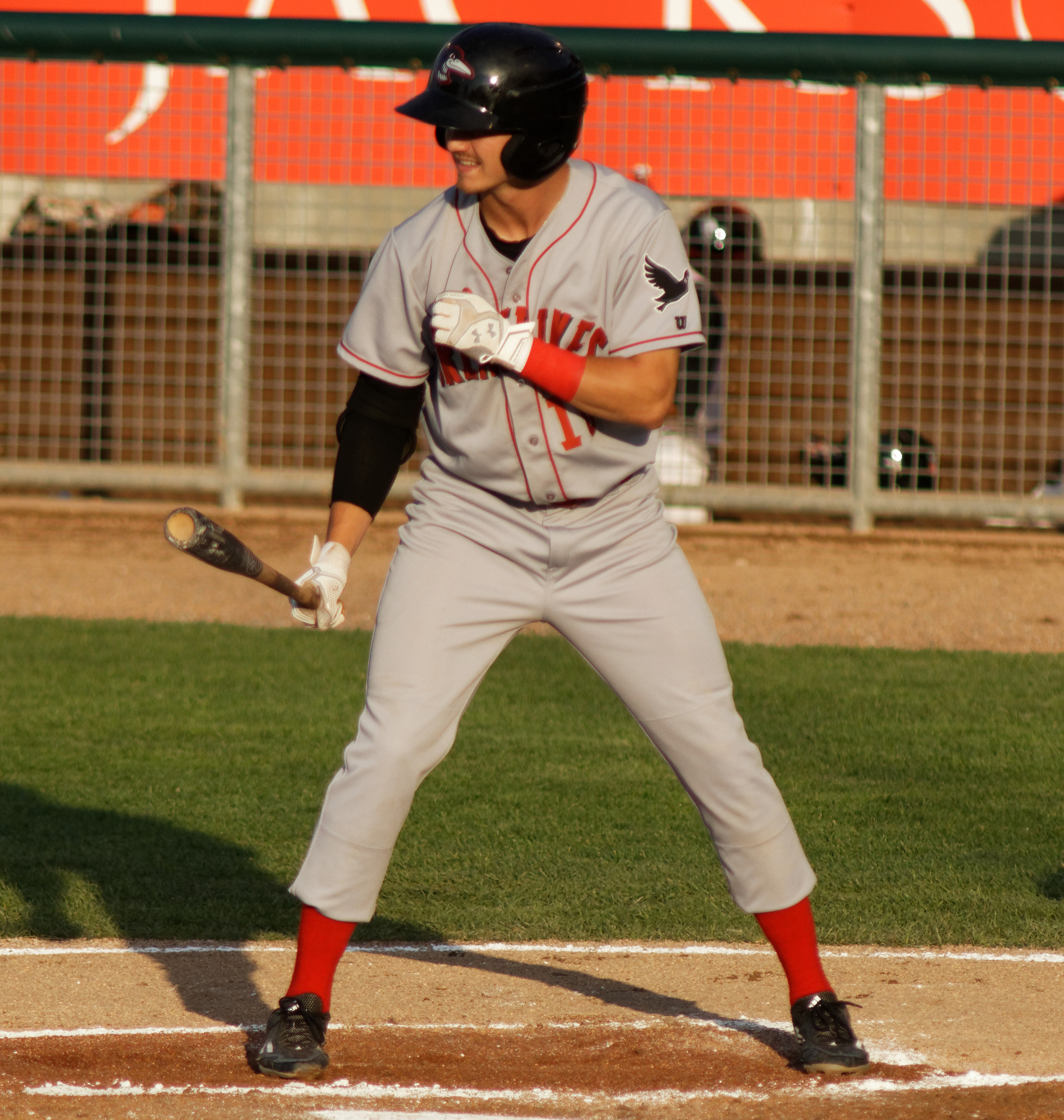
McKinstry with the Great Lakes Loons in 2016

The Los Angeles Dodgers selected McKinstry in the 33rd round of the 2016 Major League Baseball draft, and signed with the team on July 8. After beginning his career by playing four games with the Arizona League Dodgers, he was promoted to the Great Lakes Loons of the Class-A Midwest League, near where he attended college. He hit .261 in 41 games for the Loons and helped them win the league championship. In 2017, he played 17 games for Great Lakes, 82 for the Rancho Cucamonga Quakes and 15 for the Tulsa Drillers. Overall, he had a .239 batting average. He returned to the Loons to start 2018, but maintained a positive attitude about the demotion and improved his batting average and his walk ratio. He played in only 76 games in 2018, across the same three levels, with a .282 average while spending time on the disabled list.

McKinstry began 2019 with Tulsa, where he increased his power numbers and was selected to the mid-season all-star team. After hitting .279 with 12 homers and 52 RBI in 95 games for Tulsa he was promoted to the Triple-A Oklahoma City Dodgers of the Pacific Coast League on August 3. With Oklahoma City, he played in 26 games with a .382 average. The Dodgers added him to their 40-man roster after the 2019 season.

McKinstry was called up to the majors for the first time on August 5, 2020. However, he was optioned the following day without appearing in a game. He was called up again on September 16, where he made his MLB debut as a pinch hitter against the San Diego Padres, striking out in his first at-bat. His first major league hit was a double to left field off of Antonio Senzatela of the Colorado Rockies on September 20. He appeared in four games, with two hits in seven at-bats in 2020. On April 3, 2021, McKinstry hit his first career major league home run, in the top of the eighth inning off of Rockies pitcher Mychal Givens. It was an inside-the-park homer when the ball deflected off the glove of Raimel Tapia as he kept the ball from going over the fence, but thought the ball went over the fence letting McKinstry circle the bases. He appeared in 60 games for Los Angeles, with a .215 batting average, seven homers and 29 RBI. He also played in 40 games for Oklahoma City, hitting .272. In 2022, McKinstry appeared in 10 games for the Dodgers, with one hit (a home run) in 11 at-bats and also hit .335 in 48 games for Oklahoma City.

=== Chicago Cubs ===
On July 30, 2022, McKinstry was traded to the Chicago Cubs in exchange for Chris Martin. McKinstry appeared in 47 games for the Cubs down the stretch, slashing .207/.272/.361 with 4 home runs, 12 RBI, and 7 stolen bases.

=== Detroit Tigers ===
On March 27, 2023, McKinstry was traded to the Detroit Tigers in exchange for Carlos Guzman. In the 2023 season, McKinstry played in 148 games, hitting .231 with 9 home runs, 35 RBI and 16 stolen bases. He played every defensive position except catcher.

For the 2024 season, McKinstry hit .215 with five home runs, 23 RBI and 16 stolen bases in 118 games.

On November 22, 2024, the Tigers and McKinstry agreed on a one-year, $1.65 million contract for the 2025 season, avoiding arbitration.

On July 9, 2025, McKinstry was selected for the 2025 MLB All-Star Game, as a replacement for injured Jeremy Peña. At the All-Star break, he was hitting .285 with 8 home runs, 31 RBI, 15 stolen bases and a 2.7 WAR, while having played six different fielding positions so far in 2025. For the 2025 season, he hit .259 with 12 home runs, 49 RBI and 19 stolen bases.

On January 6, 2026, the Tigers and McKinstry agreed on a one-year, $4.2 million contract, avoiding arbitration.

== Personal life ==
McKinstry and his wife, Karra, eloped in Detroit over the 2024 All-Star break.
