= Gary Darling =

American baseball umpire (born 1957)

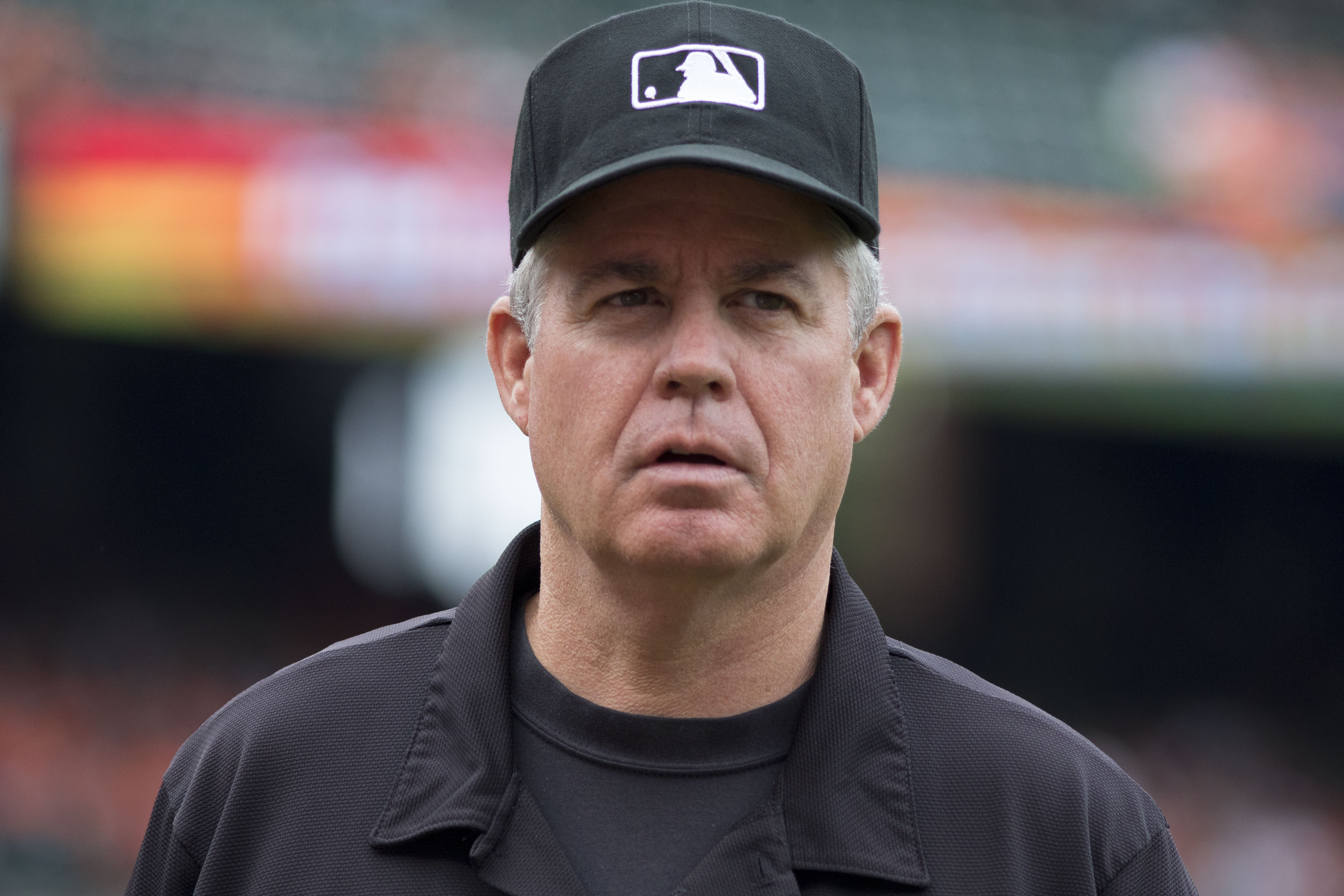
- Darling in 2013
- Born: October 9, 1957 (age 68); San Francisco, California, U.S.
- Other names: Number 37
- Occupation: Former MLB umpire
- Years active: 1986–1999, 2002–2013
- Height: 6 ft 3 in (1.91 m)

Gary Richard Darling (born October 9, 1957) is an American former umpire in Major League Baseball. After beginning his career in the National League from 1986 to 1999, he worked throughout both major leagues from 2002 until his retirement in 2014. He wore uniform number 37 (though he wore #35 during his NL tenure).

== Umpiring career ==
Darling attended Luther Burbank High School in Sacramento, California. He umpired the 2003 and 2010 World Series, the National League Championship Series (1992, 2004, 2006, 2011, 2012), two All-Star Games (1993, 2003), and ten Division Series (1995, 1997, 1998, 2002, 2003, 2005, 2007, 2008, 2010, 2013).

Darling is credited with a game that occurred prior to his MLB debut. Because Wrigley Field did not have lights in 1986, when the April 20, 1986, game reached the 14th inning, and Pittsburgh and the Cubs still being tied, the game was suspended due to darkness. The game was then completed on August 11, 1986, a different umpiring crew entered the game in the 14th inning, with Darling replacing Randy Marsh as the first base umpire.

Darling was behind the plate when Roger Clemens achieved the double milestones of 300 wins and 4,000 strikeouts on June 13, 2003.

Darling was chosen as one of the umpires for the one-game Wild Card playoff between the Baltimore Orioles and the Texas Rangers on October 5, 2012.

=== Retirement ===
After beginning the 2014 season on umpiring's disabled list, the Umpire Ejection Fantasy League reported the rumor of Darling's retirement from baseball on July 2. Major League Baseball confirmed the report on July 4, concluding Darling's 28 years of service. He was replaced on the MLB staff by 28-year-old minor league call-up umpire Quinn Wolcott.

== Personal life ==
Darling spends much of his off season doing charity work for Umps Care, the MLB professional umpire's charity, and currently serves as the charity's president.

== See also ==
- List of Major League Baseball umpires (disambiguation)
