= 2025 Major League Baseball All-Star Game =

	1	2	3	4	5	6	7	8	9	R	H	E
American League	0	0	0	0	0	0	4	0	2	6 (Note: The National League defeated the American League 4–3 in a swing-off tiebreaker.)	9	0
National League	2	0	0	0	0	4	0	0	0	7	8	2
- Date: July 15, 2025
- Venue: Truist Park
- City: Cumberland, Georgia
- Managers: Aaron Boone (NYY); Dave Roberts (LAD)
- MVP: Kyle Schwarber (PHI)
- Attendance: 41,702
- Television: Fox; Fox Deportes; MLB International
- TV announcers: Joe Davis, John Smoltz, Ken Rosenthal, and Tom Verducci (Fox); Adrián García Márquez, Edgar González, Carlos Álvarez, Jaime Motta, and Michelle Liendo (Fox Deportes); Matt Vasgersian and Yonder Alonso (MLB International)
- Radio: ESPN
- Radio announcers: Karl Ravech, Doug Glanville, and Tim Kurkjian

The 2025 Major League Baseball All-Star Game was the 95th Major League Baseball All-Star Game played between the American League (AL) and the National League (NL) of Major League Baseball. The game was played on July 15, 2025, and was televised nationally by Fox. The game was hosted by the Atlanta Braves at Truist Park in Cumberland, Georgia.

The two teams played to a 6–6 tie after nine innings, causing the "swing-off" tiebreaker rule, originally implemented in 2022, to be invoked for the first time in the history of the All-Star Game. The National League won the tiebreaker 4–3 (and the game by a de facto score of 7–6), with Philadelphia Phillies designated hitter Kyle Schwarber hitting three home runs for the National League during the tiebreaker and winning the All-Star Game MVP award for his efforts.

== Background ==
=== Host selection ===
The Atlanta Braves were awarded the game on November 16, 2023, by Major League Baseball (MLB) Commissioner Rob Manfred. Since moving to Atlanta, this is the third time that the Braves have hosted the MLB All-Star Game, with each at a different ballpark. The previous games were the 1972 edition at Atlanta Stadium, which was renamed to Atlanta–Fulton County Stadium in 1975, and the 2000 edition at Turner Field. The Braves franchise also hosted two earlier All-Star Games: the 1936 edition, when the franchise was located in Boston and the team was known as the Boston Bees, and the 1955 edition, when the franchise was located in Milwaukee and the team was known as the Milwaukee Braves.

Truist Park was originally scheduled to host the 2021 game before it was moved to Denver amid protests against the Election Integrity Act of 2021, at the recommendation of Georgia's two Senators and Atlanta city leadership (all of which represent Fulton County; the Braves moved in 2017 from Fulton to Cobb County). At the time of Atlanta's selection as hosts of the 2025 game, the law was still in effect as state legislation, although under legal challenge. In a statement made following the announcement of Atlanta's selection, Georgia governor Brian Kemp stated "Georgia's voting laws haven't changed, but it's good to see the MLB's misguided understanding of them has...We look forward to welcoming the All-Star Game to Georgia."

On July 22, 2024, the 2025 All-Star Game logo was unveiled with the presence of several former Braves players, along with Hall of Fame manager Bobby Cox, prior to a scheduled home game against the Cincinnati Reds.

=== Ceremonial first pitch ===
Former all-star position players Andrés Galarraga, Andruw Jones, and Chipper Jones threw out the ceremonial first pitch prior to the start of the game. All three previously played in the 71st All-Star Game hosted by the Braves in 2000.

=== Roster selections ===
The starting rosters for each league's position players plus designated hitter (DH) were determined by fan balloting, which was conducted in two phases. Since 2022, the first-phase top vote-getter for each league automatically received a spot in the starting lineup. The top two vote-getters for every other non-pitching position and DH advanced to the second phase of voting. There are normally six finalists for the three outfield positions in each league, except when an outfielder is the top vote-getter, in which case there are four finalists for the remaining two outfield positions. Voting does not carry over between phases.

First-phase voting was held from June 4 through June 26, and second-phase voting was held from June 30 through July 2. All voting was conducted online, at MLB.com or via the MLB app. Starting players, as selected via voting, were announced on July 2. Reserve position players and all pitchers—selected "via 'Player Ballot' choices and selections made by the Commissioner's Office"—were announced on July 6.

The leading vote-getter in each league during phase one was Aaron Judge of the New York Yankees and Shohei Ohtani of the Los Angeles Dodgers. Judge received the most votes during phase one with 4,012,983 votes.

=== Logo and uniforms ===
On July 22, 2024, the logo for the 2025 All-Star Game was unveiled. The typeface was based on the Braves' team script on the logo and uniforms, while the overall design was inspired by architecture within The Battery Atlanta, an entertainment district around Truist Park.

On September 30, 2024, Major League Baseball announced that each team's regular-season home and away uniforms would be used once again in the All-Star Game, a practice that was last seen in the 2019 game. Standard league-specific uniforms, which players wore for the 2021 through 2024 All-Star Games, would be worn for the July 14 All-Star Workout Day and Home Run Derby; unveiled on June 16, 2025, the Practice/Derby jerseys and hats featured red trim and had primary colors of navy blue for American League participants and light royal blue for National League players.

On July 3, 2025, MLB announced that the Home Run Derby participants from the American League would each wear uniform number 3, while National League entrants will wear number 44 — the respective uniform numbers of Babe Ruth and Hank Aaron. The number idea came from CC Sabathia, special assistant to the MLB commissioner and former pitcher, as a nod to not only to the host franchise (Aaron played the bulk of his career with the Milwaukee/Atlanta Braves, while Ruth finished his with the Boston Braves), but also the dates of the Derby (July 14, or 7/14, was Ruth's career home run total) and All-Star Game (July 15, or 7/15, the number where Aaron, in Atlanta, surpassed Ruth on the all-time HR list).

=== Experimental rules ===
Automated Ball-Strike System (ABS) was used during the game, using the same rules used during selected spring training games; the batter, catcher, or pitcher can challenge a ball or strike call, but must do so immediately and without assistance from anyone else. Each team receives two challenges, retaining successful challenges.

== Rosters ==
=== American League ===
Elected starters
Position	Player	Team	All-Star Games
C	Cal Raleigh	Mariners	1
1B	Vladimir Guerrero Jr.	Blue Jays	5
2B	Gleyber Torres	Tigers	3
3B	José Ramírez^{#}	Guardians	7
SS	Jacob Wilson	Athletics	1
OF	Javier Báez	Tigers	3
OF	Riley Greene	Tigers	2
OF	Aaron Judge†	Yankees	7
DH	Ryan O'Hearn	Orioles	1

Reserves
Position	Player	Team	All-Star Games
C	Alejandro Kirk	Blue Jays	2
1B	Jonathan Aranda	Rays	1
2B	Jazz Chisholm Jr.	Yankees	2
2B	Brandon Lowe^{#}	Rays	2
3B	Alex Bregman^{#}	Red Sox	3
3B	Junior Caminero^{[C]}	Rays	1
3B	Maikel García^{[L]}	Royals	1
3B	Zach McKinstry^{[E]}	Tigers	1
3B	Isaac Paredes^{[D]}^{#}	Astros	2
SS	Jeremy Peña^{#}	Astros	1
SS	Bobby Witt Jr.	Royals	2
OF	Randy Arozarena^{[M]}	Mariners	2
OF	Byron Buxton	Twins	2
OF	Steven Kwan	Guardians	2
OF	Julio Rodríguez^{#}	Mariners	3
DH	Brent Rooker	Athletics	2

Pitchers
Player	Team	All-Star Games
Hunter Brown^{#}	Astros	1
Kris Bubic	Royals	1
Aroldis Chapman	Red Sox	8
Garrett Crochet^{#}	Red Sox	2
Jacob deGrom^{#}	Rangers	5
Carlos Estévez^{[J]}	Royals	2
Max Fried^{#}	Yankees	3
Josh Hader	Astros	6
Yusei Kikuchi^{#}	Angels	2
Casey Mize^{[K]}	Tigers	1
Andrés Muñoz	Mariners	2
Drew Rasmussen^{[N]}	Rays	1
Carlos Rodón^{[I]}	Yankees	3
Joe Ryan^{[G]}	Twins	1
Tarik Skubal	Tigers	2
Shane Smith	White Sox	1
Bryan Woo	Mariners	1

=== National League ===
Elected starters
Position	Player	Team	All-Star Games
C	Will Smith	Dodgers	3
1B	Freddie Freeman	Dodgers	9
2B	Ketel Marte	Diamondbacks	3
3B	Manny Machado	Padres	7
SS	Francisco Lindor	Mets	5
OF	Ronald Acuña Jr.	Braves	5
OF	Pete Crow-Armstrong	Cubs	1
OF	Kyle Tucker	Cubs	4
DH	Shohei Ohtani†	Dodgers	5

Reserves
Position	Player	Team	All-Star Games
C	Hunter Goodman	Rockies	1
1B	Pete Alonso	Mets	5
1B	Matt Olson	Braves	3
2B	Brendan Donovan	Cardinals	1
3B	Eugenio Suárez	Diamondbacks	2
SS	Elly De La Cruz	Reds	2
OF	Corbin Carroll	Diamondbacks	2
OF	Kyle Stowers	Marlins	1
OF	Fernando Tatís Jr.	Padres	3
OF	James Wood	Nationals	1
DH	Kyle Schwarber	Phillies	3

Pitchers
Player	Team	All-Star Games
Andrew Abbott^{[A]}	Reds	1
Jason Adam	Padres	1
Matthew Boyd^{#}	Cubs	1
Edwin Díaz	Mets	3
MacKenzie Gore	Nationals	1
Clayton Kershaw‡	Dodgers	11
Trevor Megill^{[F]}	Brewers	1
Jacob Misiorowski^{[P]}	Brewers	1
Adrián Morejón^{[O]}	Padres	1
Freddy Peralta^{#}	Brewers	2
David Peterson^{[H]}	Mets	1
Robbie Ray^{#}	Giants	2
Randy Rodríguez	Giants	1
Chris Sale^{#}	Braves	9
Paul Skenes	Pirates	2
Robert Suárez^{[B]}	Padres	2
Logan Webb	Giants	2
Zack Wheeler^{#}	Phillies	3
Yoshinobu Yamamoto^{#}	Dodgers	1

† Denotes top vote-getter in each league
‡ Denotes player was a "Legend Pick", so selected by the Commissioner of Baseball

==== Roster notes ====
1. Andrew Abbott was named as the roster replacement for Yoshinobu Yamamoto due to Yamamoto starting on Sunday.
2. Robert Suárez was named as the roster replacement for Chris Sale due to injury.
3. Junior Caminero was named as the roster replacement for Alex Bregman due to injury, and was also named starter in place of José Ramírez due to Ramírez electing not to play.
4. Isaac Paredes was named as the roster replacement for José Ramírez due to Ramírez electing not to play.
5. Zach McKinstry was named as the roster replacement for Jeremy Peña due to injury.
6. Trevor Megill was named as the roster replacement for Freddy Peralta due to Peralta starting on Sunday.
7. Joe Ryan was named as the roster replacement for Hunter Brown due to Brown starting on Sunday.
8. David Peterson was named as the roster replacement for Robbie Ray due to Ray starting on Sunday.
9. Carlos Rodón was named as the roster replacement for Max Fried due to Fried starting on Saturday.
10. Carlos Estévez was named as the roster replacement for Jacob deGrom due to deGrom starting on Saturday.
11. Casey Mize was named as the roster replacement for Garrett Crochet due to Crochet starting on Saturday.
12. Maikel García was named as the roster replacement for Brandon Lowe due to injury.
13. Randy Arozarena was named as the roster replacement for Julio Rodríguez due to Rodríguez electing not to play.
14. Drew Rasmussen was named as the roster replacement for Yusei Kikuchi due to Kikuchi starting on Saturday.
15. Adrián Morejón was named as the roster replacement for Zack Wheeler due to Wheeler starting on Saturday.
16. Jacob Misiorowski was named as the roster replacement for Matthew Boyd due to Boyd starting on Saturday.

#: Indicates player would not play (replaced as per reference notes above).

== Game summary ==
=== Starting lineup ===
American League
Order	Player	Team	Position
1	Gleyber Torres	Tigers	2B
2	Riley Greene	Tigers	LF
3	Aaron Judge	Yankees	RF
4	Cal Raleigh	Mariners	C
5	Vladimir Guerrero Jr.	Blue Jays	1B
6	Ryan O'Hearn	Orioles	DH
7	Junior Caminero	Rays	3B
8	Javier Báez	Tigers	CF
9	Jacob Wilson	Athletics	SS
—	Tarik Skubal	Tigers	P

National League
Order	Player	Team	Position
1	Shohei Ohtani	Dodgers	DH
2	Ronald Acuña Jr.	Braves	LF
3	Ketel Marte	Diamondbacks	2B
4	Freddie Freeman	Dodgers	1B
5	Manny Machado	Padres	3B
6	Will Smith	Dodgers	C
7	Kyle Tucker	Cubs	RF
8	Francisco Lindor	Mets	SS
9	Pete Crow-Armstrong	Cubs	CF
—	Paul Skenes	Pirates	P

=== Line score ===
July 15, 2025 8:20 pm (EDT) Truist Park in Cumberland, Georgia
Team	1	2	3	4	5	6	7	8	9	R	H	E
American League	0	0	0	0	0	0	4	0	2	6 (3)	9	0
National League	2	0	0	0	0	4	0	0	0	6 (4)	8	2
Starting pitchers: AL: Tarik Skubal; NL: Paul Skenes; Home runs: AL: Brent Rooker (1); NL: Pete Alonso (1), Corbin Carroll (1); Attendance: 41,702 Time: 3:20; Umpires: HP – Dan Iassogna; 1B – Marvin Hudson; 2B – Chris Segal; 3B – Jansen Visconti; LF – Jeremie Rehak; RF – Erich Bacchus; Replay Official – Tony Randazzo

In the bottom of the first inning, Ketel Marte hit a two-run RBI double off Tarik Skubal to put the National League on the board first, scoring Shohei Ohtani and Ronald Acuña Jr., who both hit singles to start the inning. In the bottom of the sixth inning with Brendan Donovan and Fernando Tatis Jr. on the corners with nobody out, Pete Alonso smashed a three-run home run into right field over the bricks near the Chop House, extending the National League lead to 5–0. This was followed by Corbin Carroll hitting a solo home run at right-center afterward, extending the lead to 6–0.

In the top of the seventh, Brent Rooker hit a three-run home run to left-center, putting the American League on the board, and cutting the lead in half. After a four-ball walk from Maikel García, García stole second and along with a throwing error from Hunter Goodman put García at third. Bobby Witt Jr. grounded out to second, scoring García, and the National League led by two, 6–4.

In the top of the ninth, Witt Jr. drove in Byron Buxton with an RBI to cut the National League's lead to 6–5. With Witt Jr. on third, a 2–2 count and two outs, Steven Kwan hit a soft ground ball near third base and beat the throw for an infield single, which scored Witt Jr. and tied the game. An uneventful bottom of the ninth sent both teams to the Home Run Derby-like tiebreaker swing-off, leaving the score tied at six.

=== Tiebreaker ===
The managers of the American League (Aaron Boone) and National League (Dave Roberts) squads each selected three players (and one alternate, in the event of an injury) on his roster who agreed to participate, as well as a coach to throw batting practice, and a bullpen catcher to catch. Each player received three swings, and the team with the highest combined homer total after those three rounds would be declared the winner of the game. Dino Ebel of the Los Angeles Dodgers fed/pitched for the National League while Travis Chapman of the New York Yankees fed/pitched for the American League. Bullpen catchers Hamlet Marte of the Los Angeles Dodgers and Rainiero Coa of the New York Yankees caught for the NL and AL, respectively.

In Round 1, Brent Rooker hit two home runs, while Kyle Stowers hit one home run, giving the American League a 2–1 lead. In Round 2, after Randy Arozarena hit one home run, which extended the AL lead 3–1, Kyle Schwarber hit three home runs, giving the National League a 4–3 lead. In Round 3, after Jonathan Aranda's three failed attempts and with Pete Alonso not needing to compete, the National League won the tiebreaker 4–3, giving them the All-Star Game victory.

American League
Player	Team	Total
Brent Rooker	Athletics	2
Randy Arozarena	Mariners	1
Jonathan Aranda	Rays	0
Team Total		3

National League
Player	Team	Total
Kyle Stowers	Marlins	1
Kyle Schwarber	Phillies	3
Pete Alonso	Mets	— (Note: The National League lead was insurmountable, so Alonso did not participate after the result was certain.)
Team Total		4

== Entertainment ==
The Canadian national anthem was performed by pop singer-songwriter Lauren Spencer Smith. The American national anthem was sung by Atlanta-based country band Zac Brown Band. Opera singer Timothy Miller performed "God Bless America" during the seventh inning stretch. Rappers Ludacris and Jermaine Dupri performed during the player introductions while country singer Kane Brown performed "Georgia on My Mind".

Right after the sixth inning, a special tribute to Hank Aaron's 715th home run was played, featuring special effects and projection mapping screening clips from the original NBC broadcast of the milestone on the field, featuring audio from both Vin Scully of that network, and Milo Hamilton from radio station WSB. A firework was shot through out of the ballpark at left field, with Hamilton calling out the milestone calls, while one of the mini scoreboards projects a recreation of the number "715" that was used at the old Atlanta–Fulton County Stadium. A spotlight was used as a special tribute afterward. This tribute was originally scheduled in 2021, the year of Aaron's death, back when Atlanta was originally going to host that year's All-Star Game. Although the moment was widely praised, some expressed criticism of the omission of Scully's quote "A black man is getting a standing ovation in the Deep South", which some interpreted as racial censorship.

== See also ==
- 2025 Major League Baseball Home Run Derby
- List of Major League Baseball All-Star Games
- Major League Baseball All-Star Game Most Valuable Player Award
- All-Star Futures Game
- Home Run Derby
