= Mike DiMuro =

American baseball umpire (born 1967)

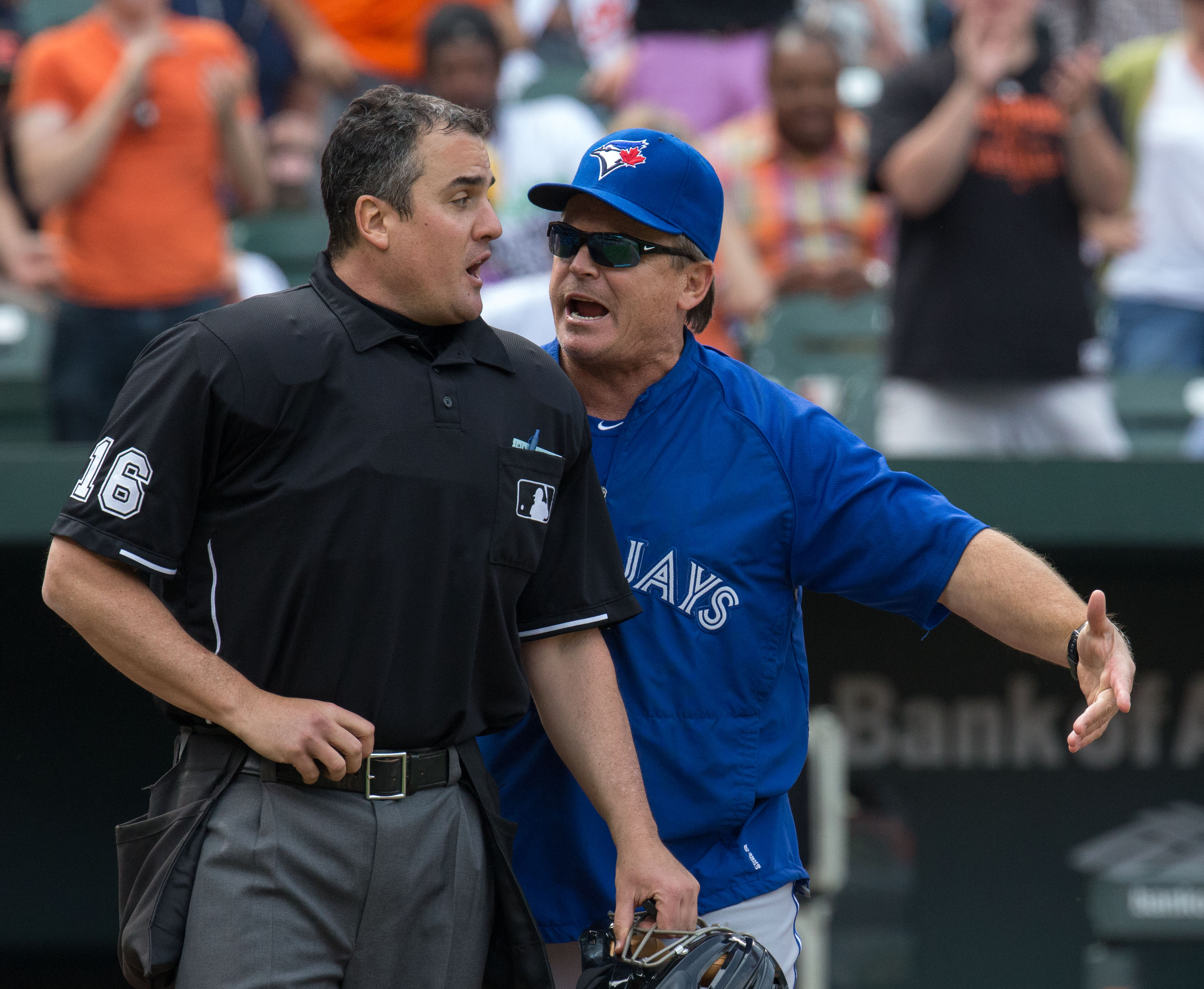
- DiMuro in 2013
- Umpire
- Born: October 12, 1967 (age 58); Dunkirk, New York, US

Professional debut
- NPB: 1997
- MLB: July 31, 1997

Last appearance
- NPB: June 5, 1997
- MLB: July 8, 2018

Career highlights and awards
- Special assignments: Division Series (2000, 2010, 2013); All-Star Games (2005); Home plate umpire for Roy Halladay's perfect game (May 29, 2010)

Michael Ryan DiMuro (born October 12, 1967) is an American former umpire in Major League Baseball. In 1997, DiMuro briefly became the first American umpire to work in Japanese baseball.

== Career ==
DiMuro graduated from umpire school in 1991, and worked in Minor League Baseball until 1999. He umpired in the Arizona League, California League, Texas League, American Association, Arizona Fall League, and Pacific Coast League, before being offered the opportunity to work in Japan’s Nippon Professional Baseball.

=== Nippon Professional Baseball (1997) ===
In 1997, DiMuro umpired in the Japanese Central League in an experiment designed to introduce American umpiring standards to the NPB. However, DiMuro was stunned by the casual acceptance of abuse toward umpires; after he ejected Chunichi Dragons hitter Yasuaki Taiho from a June 5th game for arguing balls and strikes, players and the team's manager swarmed him in protest and Taiho shoved him in the chest. Other than the ejection, there were no penalties assessed to Taiho, and after consulting with officials of both the Central League and the American League, DiMuro resigned and returned to the United States.

=== Major League Baseball (1997–2018) ===
DiMuro made his MLB debut later that summer, on July 31, 1997, at Kauffman Stadium. He worked the game between the Boston Red Sox and the Kansas City Royals alongside Joe Brinkman, Tim Welke, and Ed Hickox. He was hired as a member of the full-time staff in 1999. His first postseason assignment was in the 2000 National League Division Series, and he took part in the 2005 All-Star Game. DiMuro worked two more Division Series (2010, 2013) before his retirement.

On May 29, 2010, DiMuro was the home plate umpire for Roy Halladay's perfect game, the 20th perfect game recorded in MLB history.

== Personal life ==
DiMuro currently resides in Colorado. Upon graduation from Salpointe Catholic High School, he earned a BA in Communications from the University of San Diego in 1990. He is an FAA licensed commercial pilot. DiMuro co-founded an organization called "Blue For Kids" with fellow umpire Marvin Hudson in 2004. The organization is now called UMPS CARE Charities and is the official charity for Major League Umpires.

Mike's father Lou was an American League umpire from 1963 until 1982, when he died of injuries sustained from being hit by a car. His father also wore number 16 during the final two and a half seasons of his career (the AL did not adopt uniform numbers until 1980). Mike's twin brother Ray also worked occasional games as a substitute umpire in the AL from 1996 to 1999. DiMuro retired on July 18, 2019, after a 20-year career.

== See also ==
- List of Major League Baseball umpires (disambiguation)
