= Marvin Hudson =

American baseball umpire (born 1964)

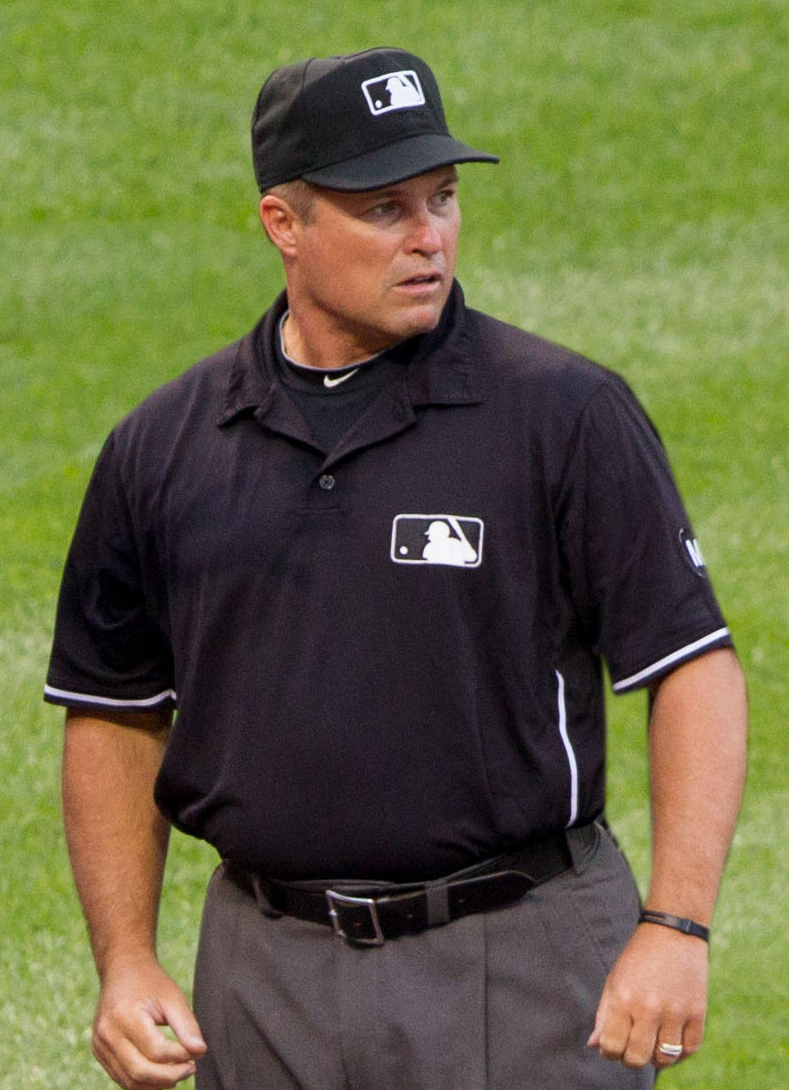
- Hudson in 2012
- Umpire
- Born: March 3, 1964 (age 62); Marietta, Georgia, U.S.

MLB debut
- July 29, 1998

Last MLB appearance
- September 27, 2026

Career highlights and awards
- Special Assignments: World Series (2016, 2020); League Championship Series (2014, 2019, 2023, 2024, 2025); Division Series (2005, 2011, 2012, 2013, 2015, 2016, 2020, 2022); Wild Card Games/Series (2020, 2023); All-Star Games (2004, 2018, 2025); World Baseball Classic (2009, 2013); Field of Dreams Game (2022)

Marvin Lee Hudson (born March 3, 1964) is an American former Major League Baseball (MLB) umpire who began his career in the National League in 1998. He has officiated in the 2004 All-Star Game and 2025 All-Star Game, eight Division Series (2005, 2011, 2012, 2013, 2015, 2016, 2020, 2022), four League Championship Series (2014, 2019, 2023, 2024), and two World Series (2016, 2020). He wore uniform number 51.

== Umpiring career ==
Prior to reaching the Major Leagues, Hudson served as an umpire in several minor leagues, beginning with the Appalachian League in 1992. From there, he moved on to the South Atlantic League for the following year, during which he also spent time in the Florida Instructional League. After umpiring for the Florida State League in 1994, Hudson moved on to the Southern League in 1995 and 1996. He also officiated for the Hawaiian Winter League in 1995. After advancing all the way to the International League, where he umpired from 1997 to 1999, Hudson was promoted to the Major Leagues in 1999.

Hudson was the home plate umpire for Armando Galarraga's near perfect game against the Cleveland Indians on June 2, 2010, and was the second base umpire for Ervin Santana's 2011 no-hitter. Hudson was umpiring at first base in Seattle on April 21, 2012, when Philip Humber threw a perfect game. He was at second base when six Seattle Mariners pitchers combined to no-hit the Los Angeles Dodgers on June 8, 2012.

Hudson has also officiated the World Baseball Classic in 2009 and 2013. MLB assigned him to the Legend Series at Rod Carew Stadium in Panama City, Panama from March 15–16, 2014. Hudson was named a Crew Chief for the 2022 MLB season.

On June 20th, 2025, the Los Angeles Dodgers' star, Yamamoto, had the achievement — a three-strikeout inning on nine pitches — in hand against the San Diego Padres in the third inning. Bryce Johnson was called out on strikes, Martín Maldonado struck out swinging, and Fernando Tatis Jr. fell behind 0-2. One pitch away from an achievement more rare than a no-hitter, Yamamoto reared back and delivered a fastball right down the middle, which Tatis didn't even swing at. Ball 1, according to home plate umpire Hudson. Pitch three was called a ball to cost Yoshinobu Yamamoto an immaculate inning.

On July 5, 2026, USA Today's Bob Nightengale reported that Hudson was one of seven umpires who had accepted a buyout from Major League Baseball to retire after the 2026 season.

== Personal life ==
He studied Business Administration at Piedmont College, from which he graduated in 1986. Along with fellow umpire Mike DiMuro, Hudson helped start the Blue for Kids Foundation, which is now part of UMPS CARE.

In 2015, Hudson founded Hudson 51 Official Wear, an officials equipment supply company based in Norcross, Georgia.

He is married to Sherry Hudson, and has two children named Zackery and Breckyn.

== See also ==
- List of Major League Baseball umpires (disambiguation)
