= Yasuaki Taiho =

Taiwanese baseball player

- First baseman / Outfielder
- Born: 15 November 1963; Puli, Nantou, Taiwan
- Died: 18 January 2015 (aged 51); Nagoya, Japan
- Batted: Left Threw: Left

NPB debut
- 9 April 1989, for the Chunichi Dragons

Last appearance
- 2002, for the Chunichi Dragons

Career statistics
- Batting average: .266
- Home runs: 277
- Runs batted in: 722
- Stats at Baseball Reference

Teams
- Chunichi Dragons (1989–1997); Hanshin Tigers (1998–2000); Chunichi Dragons (2001–2002)

Career highlights and awards
- Best Nine Award (1994)

Yasuaki Taiho

Chinese name
- Traditional Chinese: 陳大豐
- Simplified Chinese: 陈大丰
Transcriptions
Standard Mandarin
- Hanyu Pinyin: Chén Dàfēng
- Bopomofo: ㄔㄣˇ ㄉㄚˋ ㄈㄥ
- Wade–Giles: Chen^{3}da^{4}-fong^{1}

Japanese name
- Kanji: 大豊泰昭
- Kana: たいほう やすあき
Transcriptions
- Romanization: Yasuaki Taiho

Yasuaki Taiho, also known by his Chinese name Chen Ta-Feng, (15 November 1963 – 18 January 2015) was a Taiwanese professional baseball player in Nippon Professional Baseball for the Hanshin Tigers and Chunichi Dragons. He was picked in the second round of the 1988 draft and debuted the next year. In June 1997, Taiho was involved in an altercation with Mike DiMuro. The American umpire had arrived in March to show Japanese leagues the Major League Baseball officiating standard. Taiho disagreed with DiMuro's strike zone and was ejected. Taiho pushed DiMuro in protest, and his teammates streamed onto the field. No player was penalized for their actions. DiMuro, surprised by this show of disrespect, resigned from NPB and returned to the United States. After his retirement from baseball, Taiho worked as a scout and Little League coach. He also ran Chinese restaurants in Kaizu and Nagoya, where he died of acute myeloid leukemia on 18 January 2015.

His brother Masahiro Taijun was also a professional baseball player.
