= Chris Segal =

American baseball umpire (born 1982)

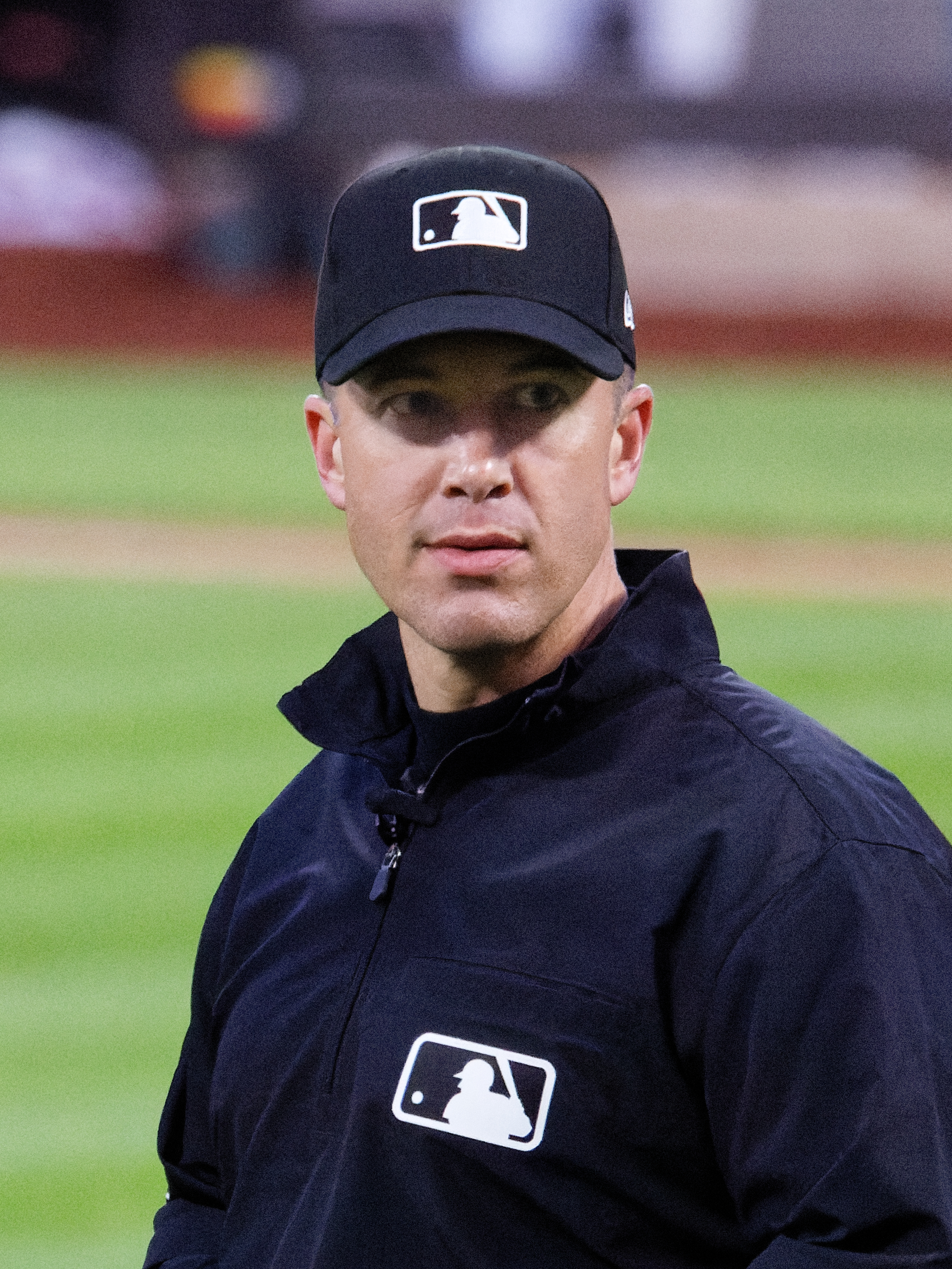
- Segal in 2024

MLB – No. 96
- Umpire
- Born: July 13, 1982 (age 44); Falls Church, Virginia, U.S.

MLB debut
- April 14, 2014

Crew information
- Umpiring crew: I
- Crew members: #63 Laz Díaz (crew chief); #7 Brian O'Nora; #96 Chris Segal; #12 Erich Bacchus

Career highlights and awards
- Special assignments: League Championship Series (2024, 2026); Division Series (2022, 2025); Wild Card Games/Series (2021, 2023, 2024); All-Star Games (2025); World Baseball Classic (2023)

Christopher Robert Segal (born July 13, 1982) is an American Major League Baseball (MLB) umpire. He wears number 96. He made his MLB umpiring debut in 2014.

== Early life ==
Segal was a member of the Boy Scouts of America and reached the rank of Eagle Scout in 2000 before graduating from Lake Braddock Secondary School.

Segal attended St. Mary's College of Maryland and played college baseball for the Seahawks before graduating in 2005.

== Umpiring career ==
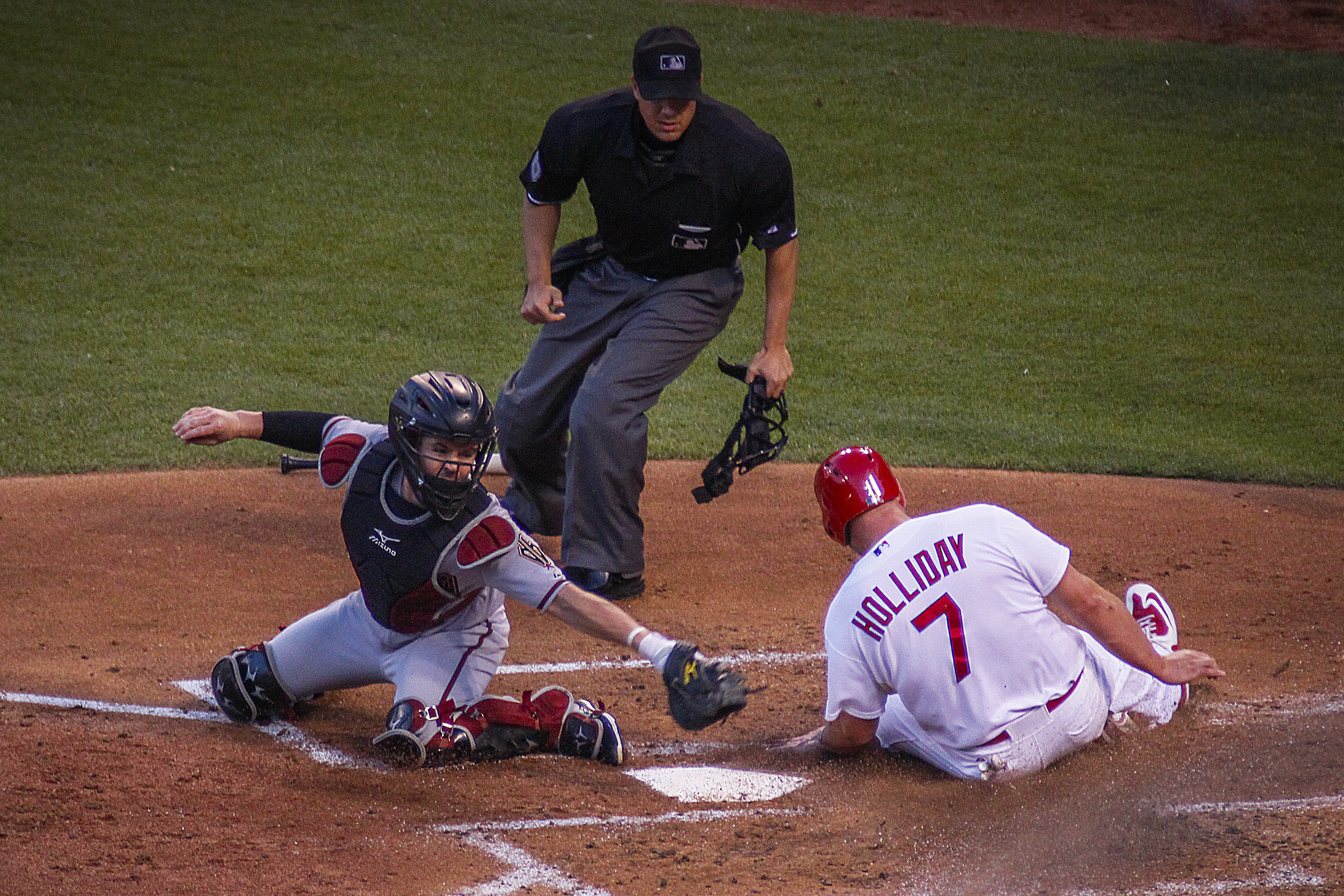
Segal calling a play at home in 2015

On July 17, 2017, Segal was struck in the head by the bat of Josh Donaldson in a game between the Toronto Blue Jays and the Boston Red Sox. Segal ended up remaining in the game.

Segal was the home plate umpire on July 30, 2017, when Adrián Beltré of the Texas Rangers got his 3,000th career hit against the Baltimore Orioles.

On August 9, 2019, Segal made headlines by ejecting Brett Gardner of the New York Yankees for arguing balls and strikes from the dugout despite Cameron Maybin being the one who was arguing.

On September 13, 2020, Segal was the home plate umpire for a no-hitter thrown by Alec Mills of the Chicago Cubs against the Milwaukee Brewers.

== See also ==
- List of Major League Baseball umpires (disambiguation)
