= UMPS CARE =

American nonprofit organization

Umps Care Charities
- Founded: 2006; 20 years ago
- Type: Nonprofit organization
- Tax ID no.: 47-2451505
- Legal status: 501(c)(3)
- Purpose: To provide financial and emotional support for America's Youth and families in need.
- Headquarters: Edgewater, Maryland, U.S.
- Region served: United States
- Executive Director: Jennifer Skolochenko-Platt
- Revenue: $295,763 (2017)
- Expenses: $287,250 (2017)
- Employees: 2 (2017)
- Volunteers: 100 (2017)
- Website: www.umpscare.com

UMPS CARE is a 501(c)(3) nonprofit organization formed in 2006 by Major League Baseball (MLB) umpires to provide comfort, encouragement, and support to seriously ill children in hospitals and their families. Umpire crews visit hospitals and distribute gifts to children during the baseball season as well as the off-season, The charity's motto is "Helping People is an Easy Call". More than 25,000 children in pediatric hospitals have received Build-A-Bear Workshop® furry friends through umpire visits. The effort originated with umpires Marvin Hudson and Mike DiMuro, who began the "Blue For Kids" hospital visitation program along with a longtime Minor League Baseball Umpire Samuel Dearth. Gary Darling, Larry Young and Jim Reynolds had been supporting charity efforts to help retired MLB Umpires, and today, UMPS CARE Charities has a family care program that helps umpires with short-term financial needs and challenges.

UMPS CARE Charities also runs a program inviting children's organizations and military families to meet Major League Baseball and Minor League Baseball Umpire crews before games, and 11,000 participants have benefited from these experiences. In 2021, the charity create a new initiative called the "Official Leadership Program" - a 6-week course for teens to learn umpiring skills on the field and leadership skills in the classroom. This is a free course and the curriculum was developed in tandem with the National Baseball Hall of Fame and Museum and Major League Baseball Umpires. An additional program, the All-Star College Scholarship, provides financial aid and mentorship to children adopted after the age of 13 to support their dream of earning a college degree. Since 2015, the charity has had a 100% graduation rate.

The current UMPS CARE Charities President is D.J. Reyburn, an active MLB Umpire.

== Programs offered ==
UMPS CARE says its outreach "has given faces and personalities to the men we used to see as stern, cold officiators". MLB Umpire Tripp Gibson, for example, has participated in bowling and golf tournaments, as well as visiting injured soldiers at Walter Reed Medical Center.

The umpires' efforts include "BLUE For Kids", "Blue Crew Tickets", "All-Star Scholarships" and the "Official Leadership Program".

=== BLUE for Kids ===
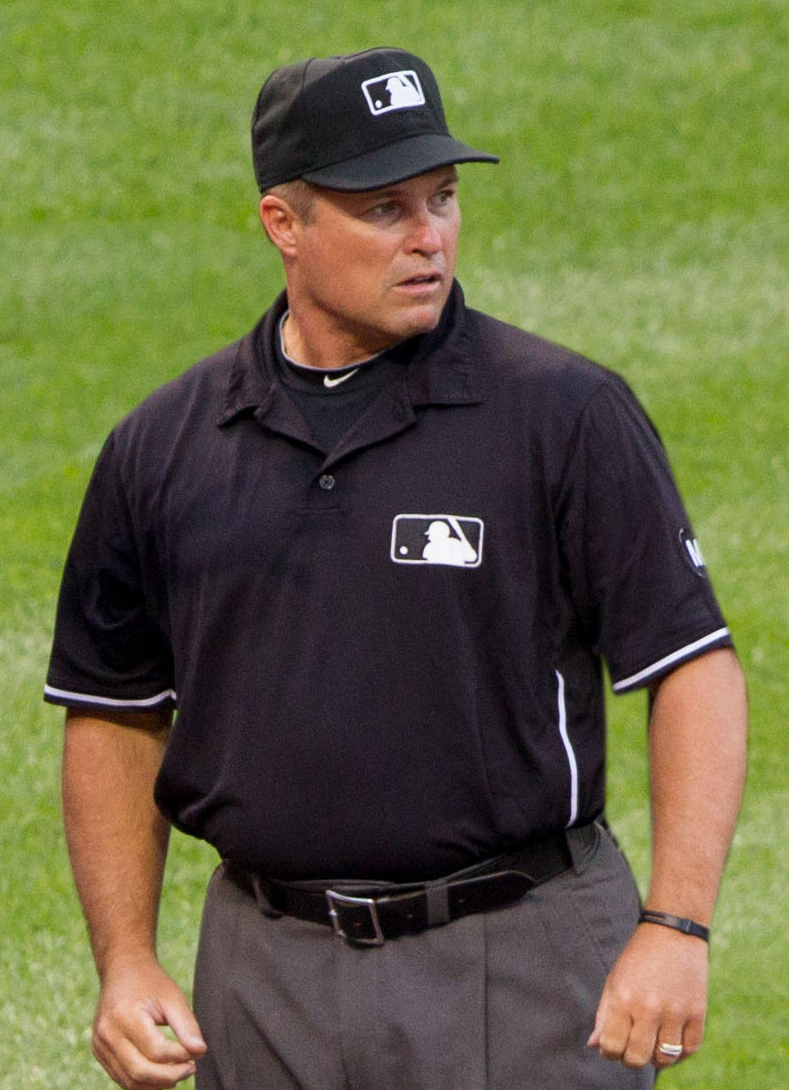
Umpire Marvin Hudson, who co-founded "Blue For Kids" in 2004

The "BLUE for Kids" program features Major League umpire crews making bedside visits to seriously ill children in hospitals. Umpires Marvin Hudson and Mike DiMuro initiated the "Blue For Kids" hospital visitation program in 2004, which became part of UMPS CARE in 2006.

Each child receives a Build-A-Bear Workshop teddy bear or other stuffed animal, along with words of encouragement. Sometimes, the home team mascot accompanies the umpires for added fun. In 2017, for example, MASN televised an umpire crew of James Hoye, Jeff Kellogg, and Will Little visiting patients at Johns Hopkins Hospital in Baltimore, Maryland, accompanied by the Baltimore Orioles Bird mascot. In covering the event, MASN reported:

For once, James and his fellow umpires got to shed their stoic exteriors and act like kids again.

In 2026, UMPS CARE Charities reached several milestones, visiting its 250th children's hospital, delivering more than 25,000 furry friends. The MLB Umpires' efforts were spotlighted during their first visit to Children's Wisconsin in Milwaukee.

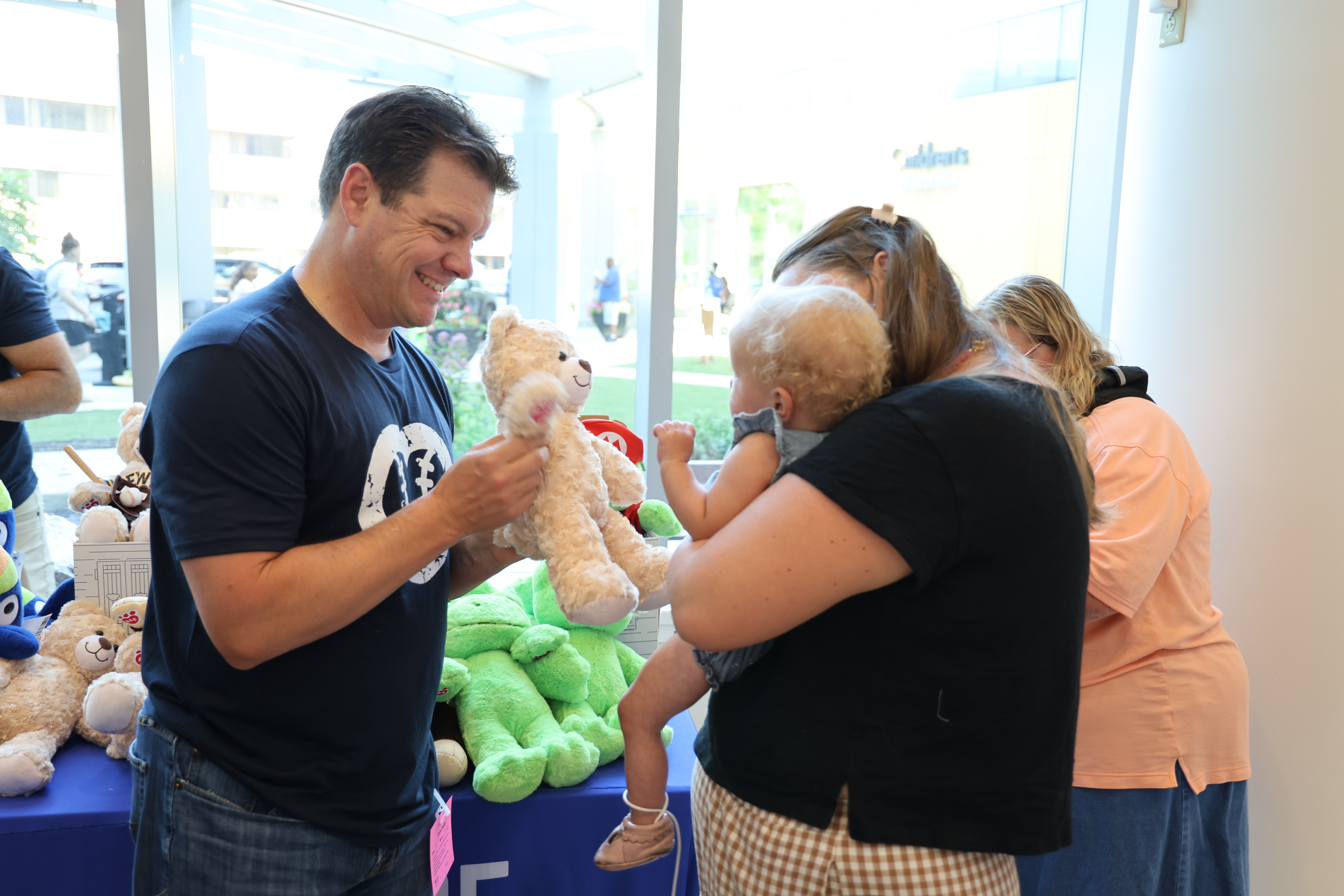
UMPS CARE Charities President and active Major League Baseball Umpire D.J. Reyburn during a charity visit at Children's Wisconsin

=== Blue Crew tickets ===
The charity also helps bring youngsters to Major League Baseball games they might not otherwise get to see. The "Blue Crew Tickets" program offers ballgame tickets to underprivileged youth and on-field presentation of souvenirs. More than 10,000 children have been recipients of the outreach. Among charity partners for this program have been Big Brothers Big Sisters, Boys & Girls Clubs of America, the Sunshine Kids Foundation, Ronald McDonald House and the Wounded Warrior Umpire Academy. Among veterans who have been saluted for their service by MLB Umpires through this program is Purple Heart recipient Eric Murray.

=== All-Star Scholarships ===
The umpires annually award college scholarships to children who were adopted over the age of 13 and who might otherwise not be able to afford tuition. Each recipient receives $10,000 per year. In addition, these students are paired with MLB Umpires and family members to provide ongoing mentorship to help ensure long-term success.

=== Official Leadership Program ===
Recognizing that there is a national shortage of umpires in youth sports, UMPS CARE Charities decided to create a new program to train and inspire the next generation of umpires. In 2021, the charity created a 6-week course for teens that was launched in four markets. The goal of the program is to teach teens the basics of umpiring in addition to life skills such as perseverance, financial literacy and conflict resolution. Most of the programs are run in partnership with Major League Baseball teams, but UMPS CARE Charities also offers the course in Des Moines, Iowa, where beloved MLB Umpire Eric Cooper was born and raised. Cooper died unexpectedly in 2019, and this course continues his legacy.

== Fund raising ==
The 501(c)(3) organization conducts online auctions and golf tournaments to help underwrite its programs.
